= List of government ministries of Uganda =

This is comprehensive list of all government ministries of Uganda, as of June 2021. Below is a list of members of the Ugandan cabinet as of 9 June 2021.

Government body	Head	Notes
Office of the President	Yoweri Museveni	
Office of the Vice President	Jessica Alupo	
Office of the Prime Minister	Robinah Nabbanja	
Office of First Deputy Prime Minister & Minister for EAC Affairs	Rebecca Kadaga	
Office of Second Deputy Prime Minister & Leader of Government Business	Moses Ali	
Office of Third Deputy Prime Minister & Minister Without Portfolio	Lukia Isanga Nakadama	
Ministry for Agriculture, Animal Industry and Fisheries	Frank Tumwebaze	
Ministry of Information and Communications Technology	Chris Baryomunsi	
Ministry of Defence and Veterans Affairs	Jacob Oboth-Oboth	
Ministry of Disaster Preparedness and Refugees	Hilary Onek	
Ministry of Education and Sports	Janet Museveni	
Ministry of Energy and Mineral Development	Ruth Nankabirwa	
Ministry of Finance, Planning and Economic Development	Matia Kasaija	
Ministry for Foreign Affairs	Jeje Odongo	
Ministry of Gender, Labour and Social Development	Betty Amongi	
Minister in Charge of General Duties in the Office of the Prime Minister	Justine Lumumba Kasule	
Ministry of Health	Jane Aceng	
Ministry of Internal Affairs	Kahinda Otafiire	
Ministry of Justice and Constitutional Affairs	Nobert Mao	
Ministry of Lands, Housing and Urban Development	Judith Nabakooba	
Ministry of Local Government	Raphael Magyezi	
Ministry of the Presidency	Milly Babirye Babalanda	
Ministry of Public Service	Wilson Muruli Mukasa	
Ministry of Internal Security	Jim Muhwezi	
Ministry of Trade, Industry and Cooperatives	Frank Mwebesa	
Ministry of Water and Environment	Sam Cheptoris	
Ministry of Works and Transport	Katumba Wamala	
Minister of Science, Technology and Innovation	Monica Musenero	
Ministry for Karamoja Affairs	Mary Goretti Kitutu	
Ministry of Tourism, Wildlife and Antiquities	Tom Butime	
Minister for Kampala Capital City Authority	Misi Kabanda	
Attorney General	Kiryowa Kiwanuka	
Government Chief Whip	Denis Hamson Obua	
Ministry of State for Agriculture	Fred Bwiino Kyakulaga	
Ministry of State for Animal Industry	Bright Rwamirama	
Ministry of State for Fisheries	Hellen Adoa	
Ministry of State for Information Technology and Communications	Joyce Ssebugwawo	
Ministry of State for Defense	Jacob Oboth-Oboth	
Ministry of State for Veteran Affairs	Huda Oleru	
Ministry of State for Economic Monitoring	Beatrace Akori	
Ministry of State for Labor, Employment and Industrial Relations	Charles Okello Engola	
Ministry of State for the Elderly	Gidudu Mafaabi	
Ministry of State for the Disabled	Hellen Asamo	
Ministry of State for Gender and Culture	Peace Mutuuzo	
Ministry of State for Youth and Children Affairs	Sarah Mateke Nyirabashitsi	
Ministry of State for Energy	Sidronius Opolot Okasai	
Ministry of State for Minerals	Peter Lokeris	
Ministry of State for Water	Aisha Sekkindi	
Ministry of State for the Environment	Beatrice Atim Anywar	
Ministry of State for Finance (General Duties)	Henry Musaasizi	
Ministry of State for Finance (Planning)	Amos Lugoloobi	
Ministry of State for Finance (Investments and Privatisation)	Evelyn Anite	
Ministry of State for Microfinance	Haruna Kasolo Kyeyune	
Ministry of State for Foreign Affairs (International Relations)	Henry Oryem Okello	
Ministry of State for Foreign Affairs (Regional Affairs)	John Mulimba	
Ministry of State for Health (General Duties)	Kawoya Bangirana	
Ministry of State for Health (Primary Care)	Margaret Muhanga	
Ministry of State for Higher Education	John Chrysostom Muyingo	
Ministry of State for Primary Education	Joyce Moriku	
Ministry of State for Sports	Peter Ogwang	
Ministry of State for Lands	Sam Mayanja	
Ministry of State for Housing	Persis Namuganza	
Ministry of State for Urban Planning	Kania Obiga	
Ministry of State for Industry	Vacant	
Ministry of State for Trade	David Bahati	
Ministry of State for Cooperatives	Frederick Ngobi Gume	
Ministry of State for Internal Affairs	David Muhoozi	
Deputy Attorney General	Jackson Kafuuzi	
Ministry of State for Local Government	Victoria Rusoke	
Ministry of State for Public Service	Grace Mary Mugasa	
State Minister for Tourism	Martin Mugarra	
Ministry of State for Kampala Capital City Authority	Kabuye Kyofatogabye	
Ministry of State for Karamoja	Agnes Nandutu	
Ministry of State for Transport	Fred Byamukama	
Ministry of State for Works	Musa Echweru	
Ministry of State for Disaster Preparedness and Refugees	Esther Davina Anyakun	
Ministry of State for Ethics and Integrity	Rose Akello	
Ministry of State in the Office of the Vice President	Diana Nankunda Mutasingwa	
Ministry of State for Northern Uganda	Grace Kwiyucwiny	
Ministry of State for Luweero Triangle	Alice Kaboyo	
Ministry of State for Teso Affairs	Clement Kenneth Ongalo Obote	
Ministry of State for Bunyoro Affairs	Jennifer Namuyangu	
Ministry of State for East African Community Affairs	Maggie Magode Ikuyaa	

== See also ==
- Cabinet of Uganda
- Parliament of Uganda
