= Cabinet of Uganda =

Ugandan ministry cabinet

There are 30 Cabinet ministers and 50 Ministers of State in the Cabinet of Uganda (2021 to 2026). The number of state ministers reduced by one in September 2024 after the death of Sarah Mateke who was the state minister for defence.

According to Section 111 of the 1995 Constitution of Uganda, as amended in 2005, "There shall be a Cabinet which shall consist of the President, the Vice President, the Prime Minister and such number of Ministers as may appear to the President to be reasonably necessary for the efficient running of the State." Ministers are responsible before the Parliament, which can attempt to force their resignation by passing a motion of censure. However, the motion does nothing by itself since the President has the final say about it. If the president does not fire the minister, he/she continues to be a minister, as is the case with Persis Namuganza, who was censured by the 11th Parliament in January 2023 for misconduct but continued to hold office as state minister for housing and even returned after the cabinet reshuffle in March 2024.

== Cabinet ministers ==
Below is a list of members of the Ugandan cabinet as from 2026-2031.

Ministry	Incumbent
Vice President	Jessica Rose Epel Alupo
Prime Minister and Leader of Government Business in Parliament	Robinah Nabbanja
First Deputy Prime Minister and Minister for East African Community Affairs	Rebecca Kadaga
Second Deputy Prime Minister and Deputy Leader of Government Business in Parliament	Chrispus Walter Kiyonga
Third Deputy Prime Minister and Minister without Portfolio	Lukia Isanga Nakadama
Minister of Education and Sports	Janet Museveni
Minister of Public Service	Katumba Wamala
Minister of Trade, Industry and Cooperatives	Sanjay Tanna
Minister for the Presidency	Milly Babalanda
Minister of Security, Office of the President	Jim Muhwezi
Minister of Science, Technology and Innovation	Jonard Asiimwe Akiiki
Minister for Kampala Capital City and Metropolitan Affairs	Minsa Kabanda
Minister of Agriculture, Animal Industry and Fisheries	Frank Tumwebaze
Minister of Finance, Planning and Economic Development	Henry Musasizi
Minister of Foreign Affairs	Adonia Ayebare
Minister of Health	Chris Baryomunsi
Minister of Works and Transport	Fred Byamukama
Minister of Lands, Housing and Urban Development	Judith Nabakooba
Minister of Water and Environment	Kahinda Otafiire
Minister of Justice and Constitutional Affairs	Norbert Mao
Attorney General	Sam Mayanja
Minister of Defence and Veterans Affairs	Kiryowa Kiwanuka
Minister of Local Government	Balaam Barugahara
Minister for Karamoja Affairs	John Baptist Lokii
Minister of Energy and Minerals	Monica Musenero
Minister of Information and Communications Technology	Justine Lumumba Kasule
Minister in Charge of General Duties in the Office of the Prime Minister	Hillary Onek
Minister of Disaster Preparedness and Refugees	Sam Engola
Minister of Tourism, Wildlife and Antiquities	Tom Butime
Government Chief Whip	Jane Ruth Aceng
Minister of Gender, Labour and Social Development	Henry Tumukunde

== Ministers of state ==
Below is a list of the current Ministers of State of Uganda:

Ministry	Minister of State
Minister of State for Economic Monitoring	Sandra Santa Alum
State Minister for Ethics and Integrity	Rose Lilly Akello
Minister of State in the Office of the Vice President	Diana Nankunda Mutasingwa
State Minister for Disaster Preparedness and Refugees	Lillian Aber
State Minister for Northern Uganda	Beatrice Okori Akello
State Minister for Karamoja	Florence Nambozo Wamala
State Minister for Luweero Triangle and Rwenzori Region	Alice Kaboyo
State Minister for Teso Affairs	Clement Kenneth Ongalo Obote
State Minister for Bunyoro Affairs	Grace Mary Mugasa
State Minister for East African Community Affairs	Maggie Magode Ikuya
State Minister for Agriculture	Desire Muhooza
State Minister for Fisheries	Robert Ndugwa Migadde
State Minister for Animal Industry	Bright Rwamirama
State Minister for Defence	Grace Ngabirano Akifeza
State Minister for Veterans Affairs	Huda Abason Oleru
State Minister for Higher Education	John Chrysostom Muyingo
State Minister for Primary Education	Phyllis Chemutai
State Minister for Sports	Peter Ogwang
State Minister for Energy	Sidronius Okaasai Opolot
State Minister for Minerals	Phiona Nyamutoro
State Minister of Finance for General Duties	Cissy Mulondo
State Minister of Finance for Planning	Amos Lugoloobi
State Minister of Finance for Investment and Privatization	Amina Mukalazi
State Minister of Finance for Microfinance	
State Minister for Transport	Julius Wandera Maganda
State Minister for Works	Siraji Musa Ali
State Minister for Water Resources	Aisha Sekkindi
State Minister for the Environment	Beatrice Atim Anywar
State Minister for Housing	Persis Namuganza
State Minister for Urban Planning	Margaret Muhanga Mugisa
State Minister for Lands	Harriet Ntabazi
State Minister of Health for General Duties	Anifa Kawooya Bangirana
State Minister of Health for Primary Care	Charles Ayume
Deputy Attorney General	Jackson Kafuuzi
State Minister for Trade	Wilson Mbasu Mbadi
State Minister for Industries	David Bahati
State Minister for Cooperatives	Tom Aza
State Minister for Kampala Capital City Authority	Kabuye Kyofatogabye
State Minister of Foreign Affairs for International Affairs	
State Minister of Foreign Affairs for Regional Affairs	Haruna Kasolo Kyeyune
State Minister for Local Government	Justine Nameere
State Minister for Tourism	Susan Nakawuki Nsambu
State Minister for Information Technology and Communications	Joyce Nabbosa Ssebugwawo
State Minister for National guidance	Alioni Yorke Odria
State Minister for Gender and Culture	Peace Mutuuzo
Minister of State for Youth and Children Affairs	Mercy Faith Lakisa
State Minister for Labor, Employment and Industrial Relations	Simon Mulongo
State Minister for the Elderly	Jacqueline Mbabazi
State Minister for the Disabled	Acan Joyce Okeny
State Minister of Internal Affairs	
State Minister for Public Service	Lydia Wanyoto

== See also ==
- Parliament of Uganda
- Politics of Uganda
- List of presidents of Uganda
- List of ministers of foreign affairs of Uganda
