= Elioda Tumwesigye =

Ugandan politician

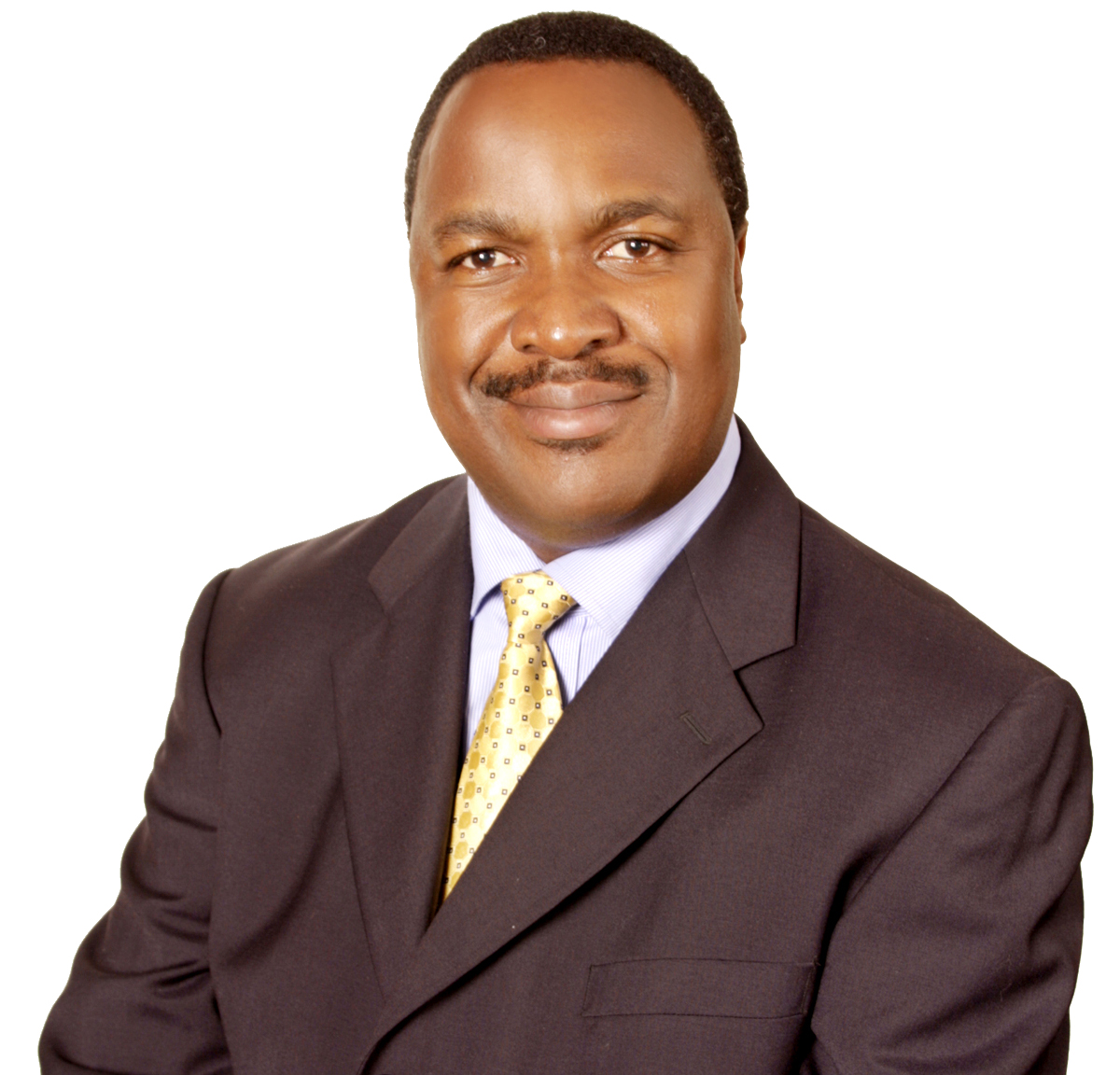
- Born: 5 April 1964 (age 62); Sheema District, Uganda
- Citizenship: Uganda
- Education: Makerere University (Bachelor of Medicine and Bachelor of Surgery); Case Western Reserve University (Master of Science in epidemiology)
- Occupations: Physician, Epidemiologist, Politician
- Years active: since 1990
- Known for: Politics
- Title: Cabinet Minister
- Spouse: Justine Tumwesigye

Elioda Tumwesigye (born 6 April 1964) is a Ugandan politician, physician, and epidemiologist who served as Minister of Health in the Cabinet of Uganda from March 2015 until June 2016.

Tumwesigye is the elected member of parliament representing Sheema North in Sheema District.

From 25 July 2013 to 28 February 2015, he served as State Minister for Health (General Duties). He was promoted to minister of health on 1 March 2015, taking a slot left vacant since 18 September 2014. Tumwesigye also served as Minister of Science, Technology & Innovation from June 2016 to May 2021.

== Background and education ==
Tumwesigye was born in Sheema District on 5 April 1964 to Yekonia and Edinance Kasyamutwe. He was their second child. He completed his O-levels at Ntare School (graduating in 1981) and for A-Levels there as Head Boy, graduating in 1984 as Uganda's third-top student. He earned a Bachelor of Medicine and Bachelor of Surgery (MBChB) degree from Makerere University in 1990. While attending Makerere, he started the Sheema University Student's Association, which was still active as of March 2015. He was also elected health secretary of University Hall, a men's hall of residence at Makerere. In 1997, he obtained a Master of Science in epidemiology from Case Western Reserve University.

== Early career ==
From 1990 until 2001, he worked as a medical officer at the Uganda Ministry of Health, serving in the Epidemiology Studies Unit during the last four years. In 2001, he contested the parliamentary seat of Sheema County North, in Sheema District, on the National Resistance Movement political party ticket. He won and was re-elected in 2006 and 2011. In 2021, he stood for member parliament for Sheema North but lost.

== Research ==
Through his career as a physician and epidemiologist, he has made substantial contribution through his research mainly on viral diseases, which has been published in some of the best journals in the world. Some of the articles include; Characteristics of human encounters and social mixing patterns relevant to infectious diseases spread by close contact: a survey in Southwest Uganda. This study provided detailed information on contact patterns and their spatial characteristics in an African setting. An intervention to support HIV pre-exposure prophylaxis (PrEP) adherence in HIV serodiscordant couples in Uganda. This study established that PrEP adherence intervention was feasible in a clinical trial of PrEP in Uganda and PrEP adherence increased after the intervention. Efficacy of oral pre-exposure prophylaxis (PrEP) for HIV among women with abnormal vaginal microbiota: a post-hoc analysis of the randomised, placebo-controlled Partners PrEP Study. The data from this study reassured that oral PrEP delivery to women can continue without the need for concurrent testing for bacterial vaginosis or vaginal dysbiosis. Low risk of Proximal Tubular Dysfunction associated with Emtricitabine-Tenofovir Disoproxil Fumarate Preexposure Prophylaxis in men and women. the study found that daily oral FTC-TDF PrEP was not significantly associated with tubulopathy over the course of 24 months, nor did tubulopathy predict clinically relevant eGFR decline. Adherence to HIV antiretroviral therapy among pregnant and postpartum women during the Option B+ era: 12-month cohort study in urban South Africa and rural Uganda. Household-Based HIV counseling and testing as a platform for referral to HIV care and medical male circumcision in Uganda: A pilot evaluation. Delay of antiretroviral therapy initiation is common in East African HIV-infected individuals in Serodiscordant partnerships. Successful discontinuation of the Placebo Arm and provision of an effective HIV prevention product after a positive interim efficacy result: the Pprtners PrEP study experience. Effect of home-based HIV counselling and testing on stigma and risky sexual behaviours: serial cross-sectional studies in Uganda. Antiretroviral prophylaxis for HIV prevention in heterosexual men and women. What's love got to do with It? explaining adherence to oral Antiretroviral Pre-exposure Prophylaxis (PrEP) for HIV Serodiscordant couples. Lay social resources for support of adherence to Antiretroviral Prophylaxis for HIV prevention among Serodiscordant couples in sub-Saharan Africa: a qualitative study. Adherence to Antiretroviral Prophylaxis for HIV prevention: A substudy cohort within a clinical Trial of Serodiscordant couples in East Africa. The study established that low PrEP adherence was associated with sexual behavior, alcohol use, younger age, and length of PrEP use. Others are risk of drug resistance among persons acquiring HIV within a randomized clinical trial of single- or dual-Agent Preexposure Prophylaxis. Intimate partner violence and adherence to HIV Pre-exposure Prophylaxis (PrEP) in African women in HIV Serodiscordant relationships: A prospective cohort study.

== See also ==
- Ruhakana Rugunda
- Chris Baryomunsi
