= Jonard Asiimwe =

Hon. Eng. Jonard Asiimwe

Minister in charge of Science, Technology, and Innovation
- Incumbent
- Assumed office May 2026
- Appointed by: Yoweri Museveni
- Preceded by: Monica Musenero

Chairman of NRM party in Hoima City and NRM Vice Chairperson for Western Uganda
- Incumbent
- Assumed office 2025

Personal details
- Born: Jonard Asiimwe Akiiki Hoima, Uganda
- Party: National Resistance Movement
- Education: Busitema University; University of Liverpool
- Occupation: Public servant
- Profession: Engineer
- Cabinet: Cabinet of Uganda
- Portfolio: Mining Engineering

Jonard Asiimwe Akiiki is a Ugandan engineer and politician who currently serves as Uganda's Minister in the Office of the President in charge of Science, Technology and Innovation, appointed in May 2026. He has served as chairman of ruling National Resistance Movement (NRM) party in Hoima City and NRM Vice Chairperson for Western Uganda. He is Executive Director of Jonard Conglomerate Investments Limited. Asiimwe holds a Masters in Oil & Gas Governance and a master’s in project management from the University of Liverpool since 2022. In addition, he has served as Chairman of the National Society of Mining Engineers, Uganda since 2016.

== Biography ==
Asiimwe grew up in Hoima, Uganda and attended Uganda Martyrs High School (Rubaga) in Kampala. He was admitted to Busitema University’s Bachelor of Science in Mining Engineering program in 2012. At the university he was President of the Mining & Engineering Students Association. He later pursued graduate studies: an Executive Master’s degree in Oil & Gas Governance and Management from 2019 to 2022 and a master’s in project management from the University of Liverpool.

== Engineering career ==
Asiimwe began as a Project Development Engineer for companies such as Mota-Engil Uganda (construction), Optima Mines (mining) and Q3 Energy (engineering). He later became Executive Director of Jonard Conglomerate Investments Ltd, his family’s business holding, and was involved in many local projects. Reports credit him with roles in oil and gas explorations in Uganda’s Albertine Graben, in planning the Tilenga quarry in Buliisa, and in the planning of the Kabaale International Airport project in Hoima. His conglomerate is known in Uganda Premier League and FUFA Women Super League, as it has officially sponsored the Kitara FC, Mbale Heroes FC and Kampala Queens FC since 2023.

In 2014 he was a founding member of the Institute of Mining, Metallurgical and Petroleum Engineers (IMMPE) Uganda. He has served as Chairman of the National Society of Mining Engineers, Uganda since 2016. He also founded a youth and skills development charity (Jonard Development Foundation).

== Political career ==
Asiimwe is a member of the National Resistance Movement (NRM), Uganda’s ruling party. He served as NRM Chairman for Hoima City and was the party’s Parliamentary flag-bearer for Hoima East City Division between 2012 and 2026. In 2025 he campaigned for NRM Vice Chairperson for Western Uganda and won then incumbent State Minister for ICT, Dr Chris Baryomunsi.

Following the 2026 general election, President Yoweri Museveni appointed Eng. Jonard Asiimwe to the Cabinet. He was sworn in as Minister in the Office of the President in charge of Science, Technology and Innovation succeeding Dr. Monica Musenero.
