= Aminah Zawedde =

Ugandan computer scientist (born c. 1978)

- Born: c. 1978 (age 47–48); Uganda
- Education: Makerere University (B.S., M.S.); University of Cape Town (M.S.); Eindhoven University of Technology (PhD)
- Occupations: Computer scientist; academic; public administrator
- Years active: 2000–present
- Known for: Academics and research
- Title: Permanent Secretary at the Uganda Ministry of Information and Communication Technology

Aminah Zawedde (born 17 September 1978), is a Ugandan computer scientist. academic and public administrator, who serves as the permanent secretary of the Uganda Ministry of ICT and National Guidance since 15 July 2021. Before that Zawedde was a lecturer and researcher in the School of Computing and Informatics Technology at Makerere University, the oldest and largest public university in Uganda.

== Background and education ==
She was born in the Buganda Region of Uganda in the 1970s. After attending local primary and secondary schools, she was admitted to Makerere University. She graduated with a Bachelor of Science in Statistics and Economics in 2001. She followed that with a Master of Science degree in Information Systems, also from Makerere University.

She also studied at the University of Cape Town, graduating with a Postgraduate Diploma in Educational Technology, in 2014. Her third degree was a Doctor of Philosophy in Software Engineering, obtained from the Eindhoven University of Technology, in the Netherlands, in 2016.

== Career ==
Zawedde has been a lecturer and a researcher at the School of Computing at Informatics at Makerere for over 15 years. For the first five years, she was an assistant lecturer. Starting January 2011, until July 2021 she was a tenured lecturer, who supervised undergraduate and postgraduate students at the school.

During that period, she worked and volunteered in various academic and non-academic positions, including as a Data Officer at the Electoral Commission of Uganda, as an IT Intern at the Uganda Revenue Authority, as an IT Consultant at the Infectious Diseases Institute and as visiting lecturer at KCA University in Nairobi, Kenya.

On 15 July 2021, president Yoweri Museveni made wide-reaching changes affecting a number of cabinet ministries, including the retirement of seven permanent secretaries. As part of those changes, Zawedde was appointed PS of the ICT ministry, replacing Vincent Waiswa Bagiire who was relocated to the Ministry of Foreign Affairs.

On 8 November 2026, president Yoweri Museveni nominated Prof. Stephen Akandwanaho to replace Zawedde as PS, Ministry of ICT and National Guidance. On 9 November 2026, Zawedde was nominated for redeployment to the Office of the Prime Minister (Coordination)

== Other considerations ==
Zawedde has authored or co-written a number of peer-reviewed articles, in the areas of her expertise and has presented some of them at international, regional and national conferences.

She serves as a non-executive director of DFCU Group, the parent company of DFCU Bank and National Information Technology Authority Uganda (NITA-U).

Zawedde was recognized among top 45 women in Digital Transformation in Africa in 2025. Community wise she has been relating with the Rotary club of Kampala since 2017 and also she is a Board Chairperson of Mustardseed Junior School in Wakiso district.

== See also ==
- Geraldine Ssali Busuulwa
- List of government ministries of Uganda
