= Milly Babalanda =

Ugandan politician

Babirye Milly Babalanda

Minister of the Presidency
- Incumbent
- Assumed office June 2021

Personal details
- Born: 5 December 1970 (age 55) Nalinaibi Village, Kamuli District, Uganda
- Party: National Resistance Movement
- Spouse: Samuel Babalanda
- Children: 2
- Occupation: Politician
- Known for: Minister of the Presidency and Newly Elected Member of Parliarment Budiope West Constituency Buyende District (2026-2031)

Hon. Babirye Milly Babalanda (born 5 December 1970) is a Ugandan politician. She became Minister of the Presidency in the Cabinet of Uganda under President Yoweri Museveni in June 2021. In 2026, she retained her ministerial role in charge of the presidency at the Office of the President upon appointment by President Yoweri Museveni for the term of 2026-2031, making her the first minister to serve in the Ministry of Presidency for more than one term. She is reportedly one of the president's most influential ministers. In September 2023, she received an award from the Joint United Nations Programme on HIV/AIDS (UNAIDS) for her contribution to the fight against HIV/AIDS in Uganda.

== Early life and education ==
Milly Babalanda was born on 5 December 1970 in Nalinaibi village in Kamuli district to Sosani Magunda and Namuwaya Ruth. She sat her Primary Leaving Examinations (PLE) in 1985 and joined Busoga High School for secondary education. After completing Senior Four in 1989 where she did not perform well, she became a village political mobilizer for politicians from her sub-county like the Rt Honorable Rebecca Kadaga. She went back to school and re-sat Senior Four in 2017 and then sat for her A-level in 2019 due to the need for academic qualifications for being a Senior Presidential Advisor.

== Political career ==
Milly Babalanda was appointed Deputy RDC Busia in 2014 by the President of Uganda. She later became the Assistant Head of the NRM National Chairman's office at Mbuya headed by Honourable Molly Nawe Kamukama. After the 2016 national elections, the President appointed her as a Senior Presidential Advisor on Political Affairs and head of the NRM National Chairman's office, where she served until her current position as Minister for the Presidency. She has been newly elected as a Member of Parliament, Budiope West Constituency in Buyende District (2026-2031)

== Personal life ==
Babalanda is a member of the Seventh-day Adventist Church and her husband, Samuel Babalanda, is a pastor. They have two biological children.

== See also ==
- Chris Baryomunsi
- Idah Nantaba
- Sarah Babirye Kityo
- Cabinet of Uganda
- National Resistance Movement
