= James Makumbi =

Ugandan politician and physician

Minister of Health of Uganda
- Constituency: Baale County (Member of Parliament)

Personal details
- Born: September 12, 1942 Kampala, Uganda
- Died: January 8, 2018 (aged 75) Kayunga District, Uganda
- Occupation: Physician, Politician
- Profession: Medical doctor
- Known for: Ugandan health policy leadership; kidnapped by Federal Democratic Alliance in February 1995

Military service
- Rank: Brigadier (Honorary)

James Makumbi (12 September 1942 – 8 January 2018) was a Ugandan physician and politician.

He held a longtime post at the Mulago National Referral Hospital in Kampala, before he was named Minister of Health. In February 1995, during his tenure as health minister, Makumbi was kidnapped by the Federal Democratic Alliance forces and released after three days. Makumbi then represented Baale in the Parliament until 2001, when he was defeated by Sulaiman Madada. The Uganda People's Defence Force then named Makumbi one of its ten representatives in eighth parliament, in office between 2006 and 2011. He died on 8 January 2018, at a hospital in Kayunga.

== See also ==
- Jane Aceng
- Ministry of Health (Uganda)
- Sarah Kataike
- Henry Kyemba
