= Maganda =

Maganda is a surname. Notable people with the surname include:

- Alejandro Gómez Maganda (1910–1984), Mexican politician
- Julius Wandera Maganda (born 1971), Ugandan politician
- Miguel Maganda (born 1980), Mexican film director
