= Adrian Tibaleka =

Ugandan politician

- Occupation: Politician

Adrian Tibaleka is a Ugandan politician. She was appointed State Minister for the Elderly and the Disabled in the Ugandan Cabinet, on 6 June 2016. However, her appointment was rejected by the parliamentary appointments committee.

== See also ==
- Cabinet of Uganda
- Parliament of Uganda
