= Jackson Kafuuzi =

Ugandan lawyer and politician

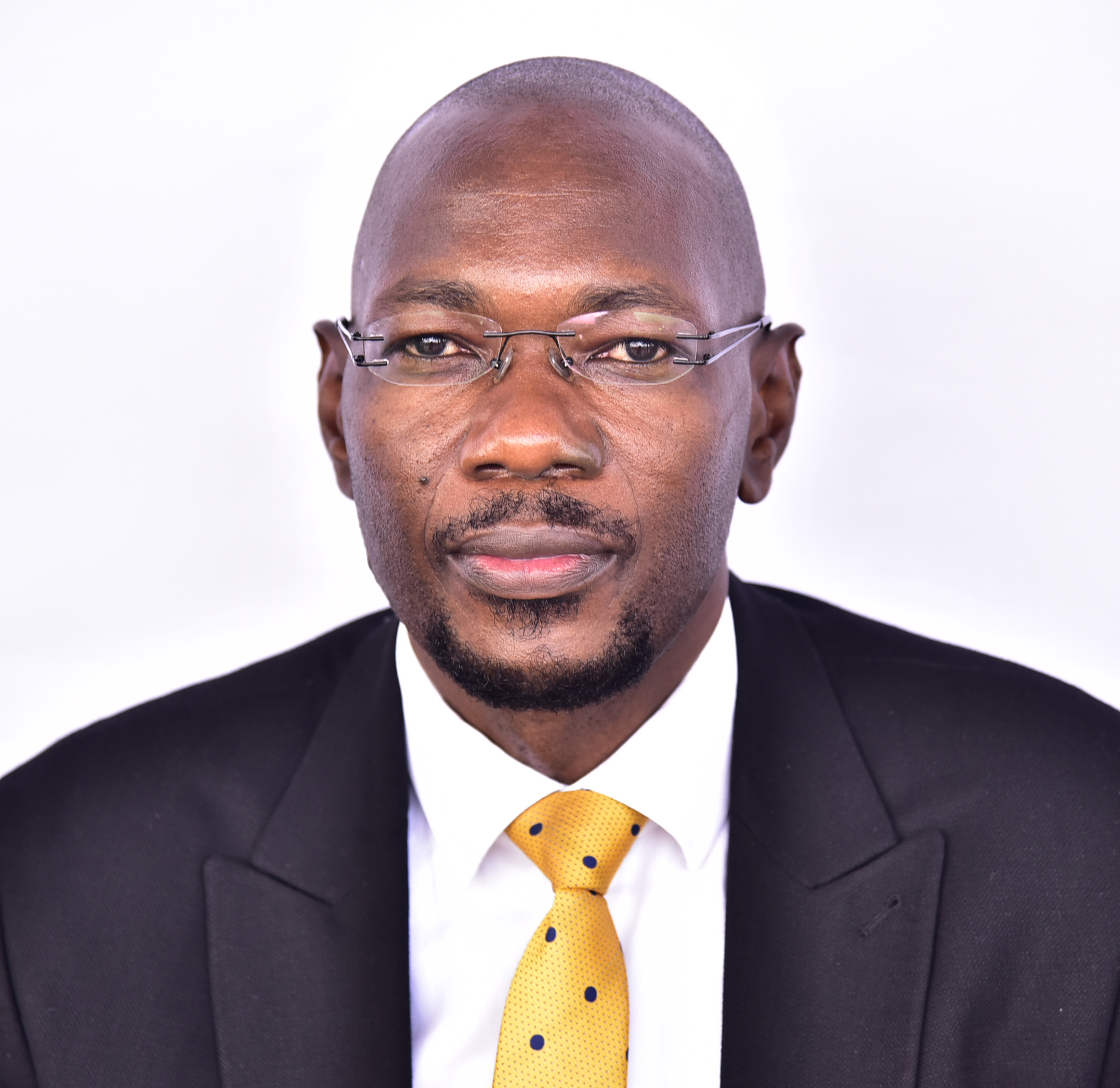
- Born: Jackson Karugaba Kafuuzi; 25 April 1977 (age 49); Kyegegwa District, Uganda
- Citizenship: Uganda
- Education: Makerere University (Bachelor of Laws); Law Development Centre (Diploma in Legal Practice)
- Occupations: Lawyer and politician
- Years active: 2003 to present
- Known for: Politics
- Title: Member of Parliament for Kyaka South County, Kyegegwa District and Deputy Attorney General of Uganda
- Spouse: (Married)

Jackson Karugaba Kafuuzi (born 25 April 1977) is a Ugandan politician who served as the Member of Parliament representing the Kyaka South County Constituency, Kyegegwa District in the 11th Ugandan Parliament.

Effective 14 December 2019, he served as the Deputy Attorney General of Uganda, in the Ugandan Cabinet.

In 2026 he was reappointed to continue serving as the deputy Artont General of Uganda for the cabinet term 2026-2031.

He serves as the member of parliament for Kyaka South County in the 12th parliament of Uganda 2026-2031 under the National Resistance Movement (NRM) party.

== Early life and education ==
Kafuuzi was born on 25 April 1977 in Kyegegwa District, Toro sub-region, Western Region of Uganda. He attended St. Joseph's Primary School, Nabbingo. He studied at St. Maria Goretti Secondary School for his O-Level and obtained Uganda Certificate of Education in 1995. In 1998, he completed his A-Level education and obtained Uganda Advanced Certificate of Education.

He was admitted to Makerere University, Uganda's oldest and largest public university, graduating in 2002 with a Bachelor of Laws degree. The following year, he obtained a Diploma in Legal Practice, from the Law Development Centre, in Kampala, Uganda's capital city, and was admitted to the Uganda Bar.

== Career before politics ==
For a period of 13 years, from 2003 until 2016, Jackson Kafuuzi was an attorney at Rwakafuuzi & Company Advocates, a Kampala-based legal firm.

== Political career ==
Kafuuzi entered Uganda's elective politics by contesting for the Kyaka South County Constituency parliamentary seat in 2011 on the Forum for Democratic Change (FDC) ticket but lost to an NRM candidate who had quit teaching at Makerere university. He later chose to run on an NRM ticket in 2016 and won the elections. He later won again in 2021 unopposed and is the current member of parliament for Kyaka south county. He is a member of the ruling National Resistance Movement political party.

On 14 December 2019, he was named in the cabinet of Uganda as the Deputy Attorney General of Uganda, a position he was appointed to by the Head of State of Uganda Yoweri Kaguta Museveni. After parliamentary approval, his swearing-in took place as scheduled on Tuesday, 11 February 2020.

== See also ==
- Frank Tumwebaze
- Molly Nawe Kamukama
