= Harriet Ntabazi =

Ugandan politician

- Born: 11 December 1974 (age 51); Bundibugyo District, Uganda
- Citizenship: Uganda
- Education: Makerere University (Bachelor of Arts); Bundibugyo Primary Teachers College (Primary School Teaching Certificate)
- Occupations: Teacher and politician Minister of State for Trade
- Years active: 2008 – present
- Known for: Politics
- Title: Hon.

Harriet Ntabazi (born 11 December 1974) is a Ugandan politician. She is the current Minister of State for Lands at the Ministry of Lands, Housing and Urban Development. Between 2011 and 2016, she served as the Women's Representative for Bundibugyo in the Parliament of Uganda.

== Background and education ==
Ntabazi was born on 11 December 1974 in Bundibugyo District, in the Western Region of Uganda. She attended Bumadu Primary School for her elementary schooling, graduating in 1986. She then attended Semuliki High School for her O-Level studies. She then studied at Bundibugyo Primary Teachers College, graduating with a Grade II Primary Teachers Certificate, in 2002. In 2004, she graduated from St. Mary's Simbya High School. She then joined Makerere University in 2005, graduating in 2008 with a Bachelor of Arts.

== Career ==
From 1989 until 1992, Ntabazi served as a Records Clerk. She then worked as a librarian at Semuliki High School, from 1994 until 1998. She served as a District Youth Councillor between 1998 until 2000. From 2001 until 2005, she served as the Women's Representative on the Bundibugyo District Local Government Council. She concurrently worked as a senior mobilizer for the ruling National Resistance Movement (NRM) political party from 1994 until 2005. She entered elective politics in 2010 and at the 2011 general election was elected to represent the Women's Representative for Bundibugyo in the Parliament of Uganda on behalf of the NRM, having defeated incumbent Jane Alisemera in the NRM primary. In 2015, however, she lost the NRM primary to Josephine Babungi Benona and consequently did not contest the 2016 general election.

On 6 June 2016, she was appointed State Minister for Industry, replacing Werikhe Kafabusa, but her appointment was rejected by the parliamentary appointments committee.She served on various committees including ICT Committee, Government Assurance Committee, Legal and Parliamentary Affairs Committee. On 21 July 2022 She was appointed State Minister for Trade, a position she holds to date. As State Minister of Trade, she is charged with the promotion and diversification of exports in the country.

== See also ==
- Cabinet of Uganda
- Parliament of Uganda
