= Julius Wandera Maganda =

Ugandan politician (born 1971)

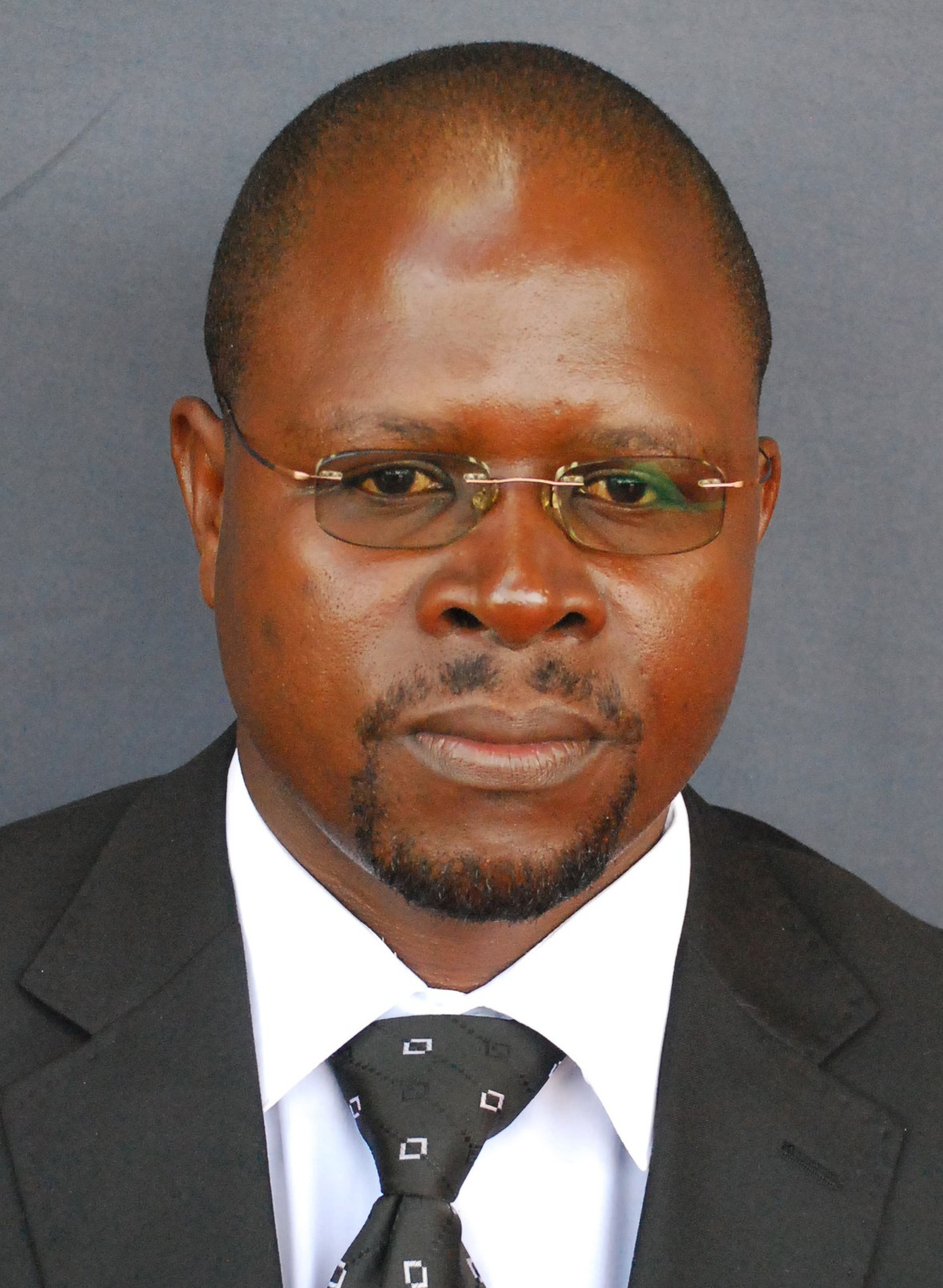
- Born: August 13, 1971 (age 55); Busia, Uganda
- Citizenship: Ugandan
- Education: Islamic University in Uganda (Bachelor of Public Administration); Law Development Centre (Certificate in Legal Practice); Uganda Management Institute (Postgraduate Diploma in Management)
- Occupation: Politician
- Years active: 2000–present
- Known for: Politics
- Title: Former Minister of State for East African Community Affairs
- Term: 6 June 2016 – May 2021
- Predecessor: Maggie Magode Ikuya
- Political party: National Resistance Movement

Julius Wandera Maganda, also Julius Maganda (born 13 August 1971), is a Ugandan politician serving as the Minister of State for Works and Transport (Transport) appointed in May 2026. He was the State Minister for East African Affairs in the Ugandan Cabinet. He was appointed to that position on 6 June 2016, serving there until May 2021.

== Early life and education ==
Wandera was born in Busia District the Eastern Region of Uganda, on 13 August 1971. He attended Bulekei Primary School for his elementary schooling. He then studied at Masaba College Busia for his O-Level education. He then completed his A-Level studies at Mbale High School, in Mbale, Mbale District.

He has a Bachelor of Public Administration degree from the Islamic University in Uganda, awarded in 2007, and a Certificate in Legal Practice, from the Law Development Centre, obtained in 2009. His Postgraduate Diploma in Management was awarded by the Uganda Management Institute in 2014.

== Career ==
=== Before politics ===
From 2000 until 2004, Wandera was a branch manager for DHL Global. For the five years from 2004 until 2009, he worked as the regional manager for an outfit called P80 Nedloyd. From 2010, he serves as the Country Director of Goomag Logistics.

=== Political career ===
In 2011, Wandera entered Ugandan elective politics by successfully contesting the Samia Bugwe County South parliamentary Constituency as an independent candidate. He was re-elected in 2016 member of parliament in the 10th parliament (2016 to 2021) on the ruling National Resistance Movement political party ticket. He was appointed as the State Minister of the East African Community Affairs that same year. In the 2026 general elections, he defeated the incumbent Member of Parliament for Samia- Bugwe South Godfrey Were Odero with 13,897 votes against 9,534 votes. In May 2026, he was appointed as the Minister of State for Works and Transport(Transport) replacing Fred Byamukama.

== Other consideration ==
In his capacity as the State Minister responsible for the East African Community, he qualifies to serve as an ex-officio member of the East African Legislative Assembly. He was duly sworn in on 31 August 2016.

== See also ==
- Cabinet of Uganda
- Parliament of Uganda
