= Justine Lumumba Kasule =

Ugandan educator and politician

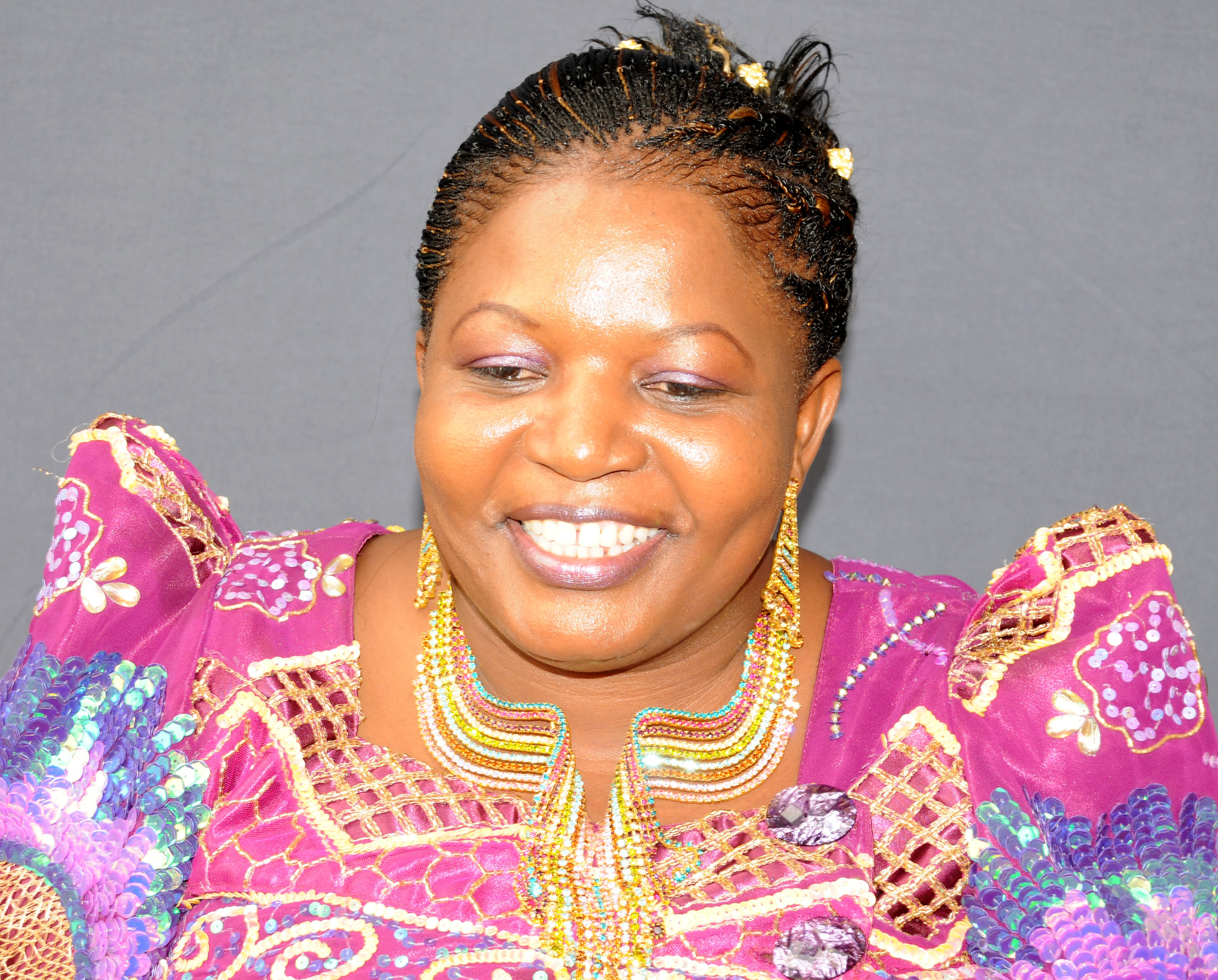
- Born: 22 November 1972 (age 53); Uganda
- Citizenship: Uganda
- Education: Makerere University (BA with Diploma in Education)
- Occupations: Teacher, politician
- Years active: 1995–present
- Known for: Politics
- Title: Cabinet Minister of ICT and National Guidance in the Government of Uganda
- Political party: National Resistance Movement

Justine Lumumba Kasule (born 22 November 1972) is a Ugandan educator and politician serving as the Minister of ICT and National Guidance in the Cabinet of Uganda, since 26 May 2026.

Before that, she was the Minister for General Duties in the Office of the Prime Minister between 2021-2026 and the Secretary General of the National Resistance Movement, the ruling political party in Uganda. She was appointed to that position on 23 December 2014, replacing Amama Mbabazi. Prior to that, she served as the Chief Government Whip in the Cabinet of Uganda from May 2011 until December 2014. Justine Lumumba Kasule also served as the elected Member of Parliament for Bugiri District Women's Representative, from 2001, until her resignation in December 2014. She was succeeded by Hon. Agnes Taaka Wejuli.

== Early life and education ==
Justine was born in Bugiri District on 22 November 1972. She attended St. Anthony Senior Secondary School in Nkokonjeru for her O-level studies. She then transferred to St. Joseph's Secondary School at Naggalama, for her A-Level education. In 1993, she was admitted to Makerere University, where she graduated with the degree of Bachelor of Arts with a concurrent Diploma in Education, in 1996.

== Career ==
From 1996 until 1997, Justine worked as a teacherFrom 1997 until 1998, she worked as the Acting District Inspector of Schools in her home district. From 1998 until 2001, she worked as a Senior Education Officer at the Ministry of Education. In 2001, she was elected to the Parliament, on the National Resistance Movement political party ticket, to serve as the Women's Representative for Bugiri District. She was re-elected from 2001 until 2014, when she stepped down to become secretary general of the ruling National Resistance Movement political party. In May 2011, she was appointed as Government Chief Whip, replacing John Nasasira.

== Personal life ==
She is a married mother with two sons. She is a Roman Catholic.

== See also ==
- Cabinet of Uganda
- Parliament of Uganda
