= Molly Nawe Kamukama =

Ugandan politician (born 1973)

- Born: 23 August 1973 (age 53); Uganda
- Education: Makerere University (Bachelor of Arts in Education); Aptech Uganda (Certificate in Computer Science); Uganda Management Institute (Certificate in Management) (Master of Management Studies); Institute of Chartered Secretaries and Administrators (Chartered Secretary)
- Occupation: Politician
- Years active: since 1997
- Known for: Politics

Molly Nawe Kamukama (née Molly Nawe), commonly known as Molly Kamukama is the current Woman Member OF Parliament for Kazo district.(born 23 August 1973), is a Ugandan politician and management professional, who served as the State Minister for Economic Monitoring in the Office of the President, in the Cabinet of Uganda from 14 December 2019 to June 2021 when she was replaced by Peter Ogwang.

== Background and education ==
She was born in Kiruhura District on 23 August 1973. She attended Bugarihe Primary School, before transferring to Kazo Senior Secondary School, where she obtained her Uganda Certificate of Education in 1992. Two years later, she completed her A-Level studies at Nganwa High School and obtained a Uganda Advanced Certificate of Education.

She has a Bachelor of Arts in Education degree, awarded in 1997. Her Master of Management Studies degree was awarded by Uganda Management Institute in 2008. She is certified as a Chartered Secretary by the Institute of Chartered Secretaries and Administrators of the United Kingdom.

== Career ==
In 1997, Molly took up employment as an administrative assistant at Kampala City Council, the precursor of present-day Kampala Capital City Authority, serving there until 1998. For the next 14 years, she worked at the Uganda Electoral Commission, in various roles, rising from data editor in 1998 to head, Department of Voter Education and Training, in 2012. For the next three years, until 2016, she went into private consulting, serving diverse clients, including the South Sudanese Electoral Commission and UNDP Nigeria.

In 2014, she was hired by the Government of Uganda to serve as the political assistant to the chairman of the ruling National Resistance Movement political party, serving in that capacity until 2016. In 2016, she was appointed principal private secretary to the president of Uganda, serving there until December 2019.

In a cabinet reshuffle, on 14 December 2019, Molly Kamukama was named to the cabinet. After parliamentary approval, she swore in as State Minister for Economic Monitoring, on 13 January 2020.

== Family ==
Molly Nawe Kamukama is married.

== See also ==
- Kazo District
- Parliament of Uganda
