= Grace Mary Mugasa =

Ugandan politician

Honourable Grace Mary Mugasa (Mrs)
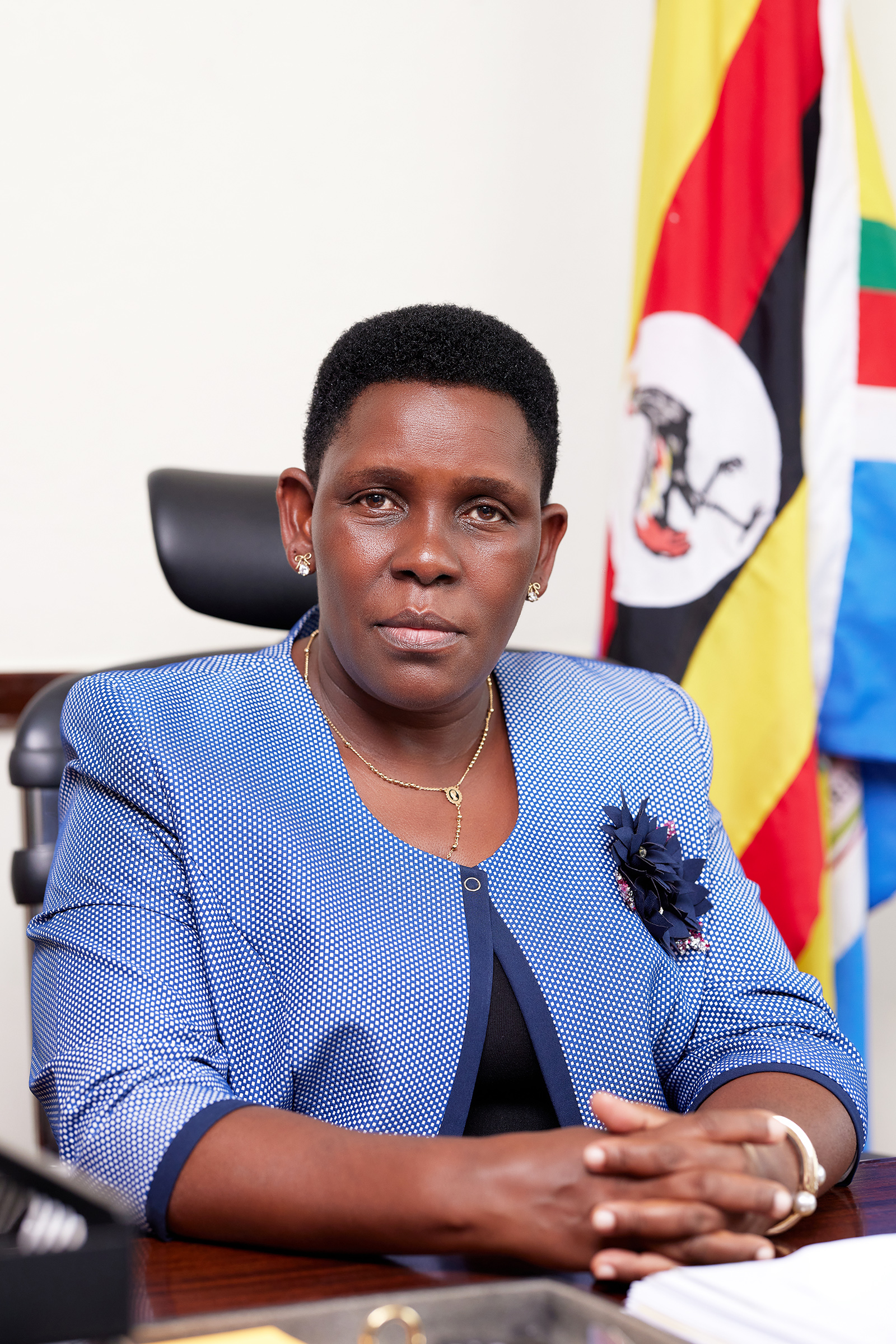

Minister of State, Office of the Prime Minister (in Charge of Bunyoro Affairs)
- Incumbent
- Assumed office 08 June 2026
- President: Yoweri Museveni
- Prime Minister: Robinah Nabbanja
- Preceded by: Jenipher Namuyangu

Minister of State for Public Service Uganda
- In office 21 June 2021 – 26 May 2026
- President: Yoweri Museveni
- Prime Minister: Robinah Nabbanja
- Preceded by: David Karubanga

Mayor of Hoima
- In office 19 May 2011 – 24 May 2021
- Preceded by: Francis Atugonza
- Succeeded by: Brian Kaboyo

Personal details
- Born: 28 December 1968 (age 57) Hoima, Uganda
- Citizenship: Uganda
- Party: National Resistance Movement
- Education: Uganda Martyrs University (MA Development Studies) (BA (Hons), Democracy and Development Studies); College of Professional Management (CPM) UK (Diploma, Principles of Modern Management) (Diploma, Sales Management and Marketing)
- Website: Official website

Grace Mary Mugasa (née Mugisa; born 28 December 1968) is a Ugandan politician who is the Minister of State, Office of the Prime Minister (in Charge of Bunyoro Affairs. She was appointed on 26 May 2026, by the President Yoweri Kaguta Museveni, assuming office on 8 June 2026. Grace Mary took office from David Karubanga, the former State Minister and Member of Parliament representing Kigorobya. Before this appointment, she served as Minister of State for Public Service and was the first female Mayor of Hoima Municipality, seeing it through its transition to City status in July 2020.

== Background and education ==
Grace Mary Mugasa was born in Munteme, Hoima District, Western Uganda in December, 1968 to Pascal and Regina Rukanyanga. She holds two Diplomas in Principles of Modern Management, Sales Management and Marketing from the College of Professional Management, United Kingdom. as well as a Bachelors of Arts Degree in Democracy and Development Studies and a Master of Arts in Development Studies from Uganda Martyrs University, Nkozi. Mrs. Mugasa also holds a Certificate in Capacity Building for Local Political Leaders from the ICLD, the Swedish Centre for International Development and a Certificate on Gender Mainstreaming in Local governance from Israel – MASHAV Golda Meir Centre Mt Carmel.

== Career ==
Mugasa started her career as a teacher in Kizirafumbi Sub-county after her O-Level in 1986. Upon completion of her two diplomas in Principles of Modern Management and Sales Management & Marketing, she became a community trainer in small businesses and owned a small business herself. In 2001, she joined active Politics where she vied and was elected as woman councilor representing Northern ward in Hoima Town Council, Hoima District. She held the position for 10 years after her re-election in 2006. In July 2010, Hoima Town Council was upgraded to municipal status, and she was elected the first mayor of Hoima Municipality in March 2011 and later re-elected in 2016.

In the 2021 general elections, then-incumbent Mayor, Grace Mary contested as an Independent candidate after a controversial election with contested results and violence against her supporters from one of the contesting candidates' camp. She contested with three other candidates where Brian Kaboyo, the National Resistance Movement Flag bearer emerged as winner with 12,451 votes followed closely by Mugasa with 12,298 votes. The other candidates were Dan Kaija of Uganda People's Congress (UPC) who had 315 votes, Rashid Tumusiime of the National Unity Platform with 303 votes and Wyclif Tumusiime, Forum for Democratic Change (FDC) who came last with 215 votes.

Grace is also one of the founders of the Global Parliament of Mayors (GPM) in 2016 and was the second vice-chair of the GPM Executive Committee until her appointment as minister in June, 2021. She has also served as board member on various Boards: HOFOKAM Ltd (a microfinance company); Communications Board of Hoima Catholic Diocese; Millennium Business School; St. Andrea Kaahwa's College; Kitara Secondary School.

== Personal life ==
Grace Mary is married to Aloysius Mugasa Adyeeri, an Administrative Specialist and author, currently Chairman of Uganda's National Lotteries and Gaming Board - a position he held upon retiring as managing director of Uganda Kolping Society. She is a mother with grown children and grandchildren as well as a guardian to a number of orphans. Grace's interests are Gender equality, and clean environment.

== Legacy ==
During her two terms as mayor, Mary Grace Mugasa gained recognition for her "no-nonsense" approach towards organised urbanization. She earned a nickname as Hoima's "Iron Lady" among the city's residents and is known for intolerance towards disorder and garbage around the city while she advocated for proper, well-planned building procedures. During her time as mayor, Hoima saw a transformation through rehabilitation of the Municipal/City headquarters as well as road construction with the support of the Uganda Support to Municipal Infrastructure Development (USMID) program, funded by the World Bank-IDA's loan program.

As of March 2022, almost a year after her tenure, roads accredited to Grace Mary's requests towards the president and continuous lobbying were under construction in Hoima city. These included the roads leading to and around the major worship centres – Our Lady of Lourdes Cathedral, Bujumbura, St. Peter's Cathedral, Duhaga and Bwikya mosque, Kinubi.

== See also ==
- List of government ministries of Uganda
- Cabinet of Uganda
