= Diana Nankunda Mutasingwa =

Ugandan politician

- Education: Diploma and degree from the Hertfordshire International College
- Occupation: Buikwe District Woman Member of Parliament
- Political party: National Resistance Movement

Diana Nankunda Mutasingwa, also referred to as Diana Mutasingwa Kagyenyi, is a Ugandan politician. She is the current Minister of State in the Office of the Vice President of Uganda. She is Buikwe's first minister. On May 19, 2021, Mutasingwa was sworn in as the Buikwe District Woman Member of Parliament under the National Resistance Movement political party. She replaced Judith Babirye.

== Background and education ==
She is a resident of Bukaya in Njeru division, and was born to Charles Mutasingwa.

She completed her primary school from Kampala Parent's School. She later joined Greenhill Academy for both Uganda Certificate of Education (UCE) and Uganda Advanced Certificate of Education (UACE). She was awarded a diploma and a degree from Hertfordshire International College.

In 2018, Charles Mutasingwa explored the villages and held rallies and door-to-door meetings on Diana's behalf, who was reported to have been poisoned during her campaigns in parts of Nyenga Division.

== Life before politics ==
Mutasingwa was employed as the human resource manager at Afro Freight Clearing and Forwarding Company before joining politics.

== Political career ==
Before contesting as Buikwe's Woman Member of Parliament, Mutasingwa contested for Njeru Municipality mayor in 2019, but was defeated by Yasin Kyazze. Buikwe district had never had a minister until President Museveni designated Mutasingwa as State Minister in the Vice President's Office. Mutasingwa is working with Jessica Alupo, the vice president of Uganda.

She was appointed as the Buikwe District Football Associations Brand Ambassador in Uganda, and she became the official sponsor for the District Football Associations for five years, starting in 2021.

== See also ==
- List of government ministries of Uganda
- Cabinet of Uganda
- Parliament of Uganda
