= Kiryowa Kiwanuka =

Ugandan lawyer and politician

Kiryowa Kiwanuka Nsumikambi Mugambe
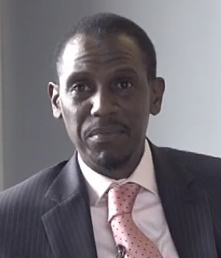

Minister of Defence and Veteran Affairs
- Incumbent
- Assumed office 26 May 2026
- Preceded by: Jacob Marksons Oboth

Attorney General of Uganda
- In office 8 June 2021 – 25 May 2026
- Preceded by: William Byaruhanga
- Succeeded by: Sam Mayanja

Personal details
- Born: 1973 (age 52–53) Uganda
- Citizenship: Uganda
- Spouse: Sarah Kiwanuka
- Children: 4
- Education: Makerere University; Law Development Centre; University of Dundee
- Occupation: Lawyer, politician

Kiryowa Kiwanuka Nsumikambi Mugambe, commonly known as Kiryowa Kiwanuka, is a Ugandan lawyer, businessman and politician who serves as the Minister of Defence and Veteran Affairs in the Ugandan Cabinet. He was appointed to that position on 26 May 2026, replacing Jacob Marksons Oboth. He previously served as the Attorney General of Uganda from 8 June 2021 to 25 May 2026.

== Early life and education ==
Kiwanuka was born in Uganda circa 1973. His father, the late Jimmy Mugambe Kiwanuka, was a Ugandan lawyer. His late paternal grandfather, Jolly Joe Kiwanuka, was a Ugandan politician who was murdered by dictator Idi Amin in the early 1970s.

Kiwanuka spent his early childhood in Nairobi, Kenya, where the family lived in political exile, before returning to Uganda in 1980. He attended Budo Junior School for his elementary school. He then transferred to King's College Budo for his O-Level studies. For his A-Level education, he studied at Makerere College School. In 1993, he was admitted to Makerere University, Uganda's oldest and largest public university, to study law.

Kiwanuka graduated from Makerere University in 1996 with a Bachelor of Laws (LLB) Honours degree. He then attended the Law Development Centre from 1996 to 1997, graduating with a Post-Graduate Diploma in Legal Practice. He was formally admitted to the Uganda Bar in 1998. In 2017, he was awarded a Master of Laws (LLM) degree with Merit in Petroleum Law and Policy by the University of Dundee in Scotland.

== Career ==
Kiwanuka began his legal career as a legal associate at Mulira & Co. Advocates. On 28 September 2001, he co-founded Kiwanuka and Karugire Company Advocates (now known as K&K Advocates), serving as a founding partner for two decades. During his tenure in private practice, he specialized in commercial litigation, corporate arbitration, energy, and infrastructure law. He accumulated extensive experience arguing high-stakes cases before Uganda's national courts of judicature and the East African Court of Justice (EACJ), representing both state and non-state entities, while also serving as an advisory technical resource and negotiator across the African continent.

On 8 June 2021, Kiwanuka entered public service when he was appointed Attorney General of Uganda, succeeding William Byaruhanga, at which point he took a formal sabbatical from K&K Advocates. He served as the government's chief legal advisor until 25 May 2026. On 26 May 2026, President Yoweri Museveni reappointed him to the cabinet as the Minister of Defence and Veteran Affairs, replacing Jacob Marksons Oboth.

Kiwanuka holds numerous domestic and international professional memberships and credentials. He is an active member of the Uganda Law Society (ULS), the East African Law Society (EALS), the International Bar Association (IBA), and the Association of International Petroleum Negotiators (AIPN). He is also a member of the Chartered Institute of Arbitrators (CIArb), a certified Insolvency Practitioner under the Ugandan Insolvency Act of 2011, a Notary Public, and a Commissioner for Oaths.

== Family ==
Kiwanuka is married to Sarah Kiwanuka, whom he met in 1997. They are the parents of four children. He has a younger brother, Bakadde Kiwanuka, who practices law in the United Kingdom.

== Other responsibilities ==
Kiwanuka served as a member of the inaugural board of directors of the Petroleum Authority of Uganda (PAU) from October 2015 to October 2019. He was re-appointed to the board for a second term on 12 February 2020, serving until he assumed the position of Attorney General in June 2021.

He also served as a member of the Makerere University Council from December 2018 to December 2022. During his tenure on the council, he chaired the Audit Committee and was a member of the Appointments Board.

Additionally, he serves as the Chairman of Express Football Club, a premier league soccer club in Uganda.

== See also ==
- Cabinet of Uganda
- Parliament of Uganda
