= Ministry of Gender, Labour and Social Development (Uganda) =

Government ministry of Uganda

Coordinates: 00°19′00″N 32°34′43″E

- Coat of Arms of Uganda

Ministry overview
- Type: Ministry
- Jurisdiction: Government of Uganda
- Headquarters: George Street, Nakasero Hill; Kampala, Uganda
- Ministry executive: Betty Amongi, Minister of Gender, Labour and Social Development
- Website: Homepage

The Ministry of Gender, Labour and Social Development (MGLSD) is a Cabinet-level government ministry of Uganda. The mandate of the ministry is to empower citizens to maximize their individual and collective potential by developing skills, increasing labour productivity, and cultural enrichment to achieve sustainable and gender-sensitive development. The ministry is headed by a Cabinet minister, Betty Amongi Akena.

== Location ==
The headquarters of the MGLSD are on George Street on Nakasero Hill in the Central Division of Kampala, the capital and largest city of Uganda. The coordinates of the ministry headquarters are 0°19'00.0"N, 32°34'43.0"E (Latitude:0.316677; Longitude:32.578611).

== Directorates ==
MGLSD is divided into the following administrative directorates:

- Labour, Employment and Occupational Safety
- Social Protection
- Gender & Community Development

== Leadership ==
The cabinet minister is assisted by five ministers of state.

- State Minister for Gender and Culture - Peace Mutuuzo
- State Minister for Youth and Children Affairs - Hon. Nyirabashitsi Sarah Mateke
- State Minister for the Elderly - Hon. Dominic Mafwabi Gidudu
- State Minister for Disability Affairs - Hon. Asamo Hellen Grace
- State Minister for Labour, Employment and Industrial Relations - Col. Rtd Okello P. Charles Engola

The ministry is administratively headed by a Permanent Secretary, who serves as the accounting officer and is responsible for the implementation of government policies. Past holders of the position include Pius Bigirimana, who served from 2013 to 2019.

== List of ministers ==
=== Minister of Gender, Labour and Social Development ===
- Betty Amongi (8 June 2021 – present)
- Frank Tumwebaze (14 December 2019 – 8 June 2021)
- Janat Mukwaya (6 June 2016 – 14 December 2019)

=== Minister of Gender and Social Issues ===
- Wilson Muruli Mukasa (1 March 2015 – 6 June 2016)
- Mary Karooro Okurut (23 May 2013 – 1 March 2015)
- Syda Bbumba (27 May 2011 – 16 February 2012)

=== Minister of Gender, Labour and Social Development ===
- Gabriel Opio (16 February 2009 – 27 May 2011)
- Syda Bbumba (1 June 2006 – 16 February 2009)
- Zoe Bakoko Bakoru (2001 – 1 June 2006)

== See also ==
- Politics of Uganda
- Parliament of Uganda
