= Peace Mutuuzo =

Ugandan politician

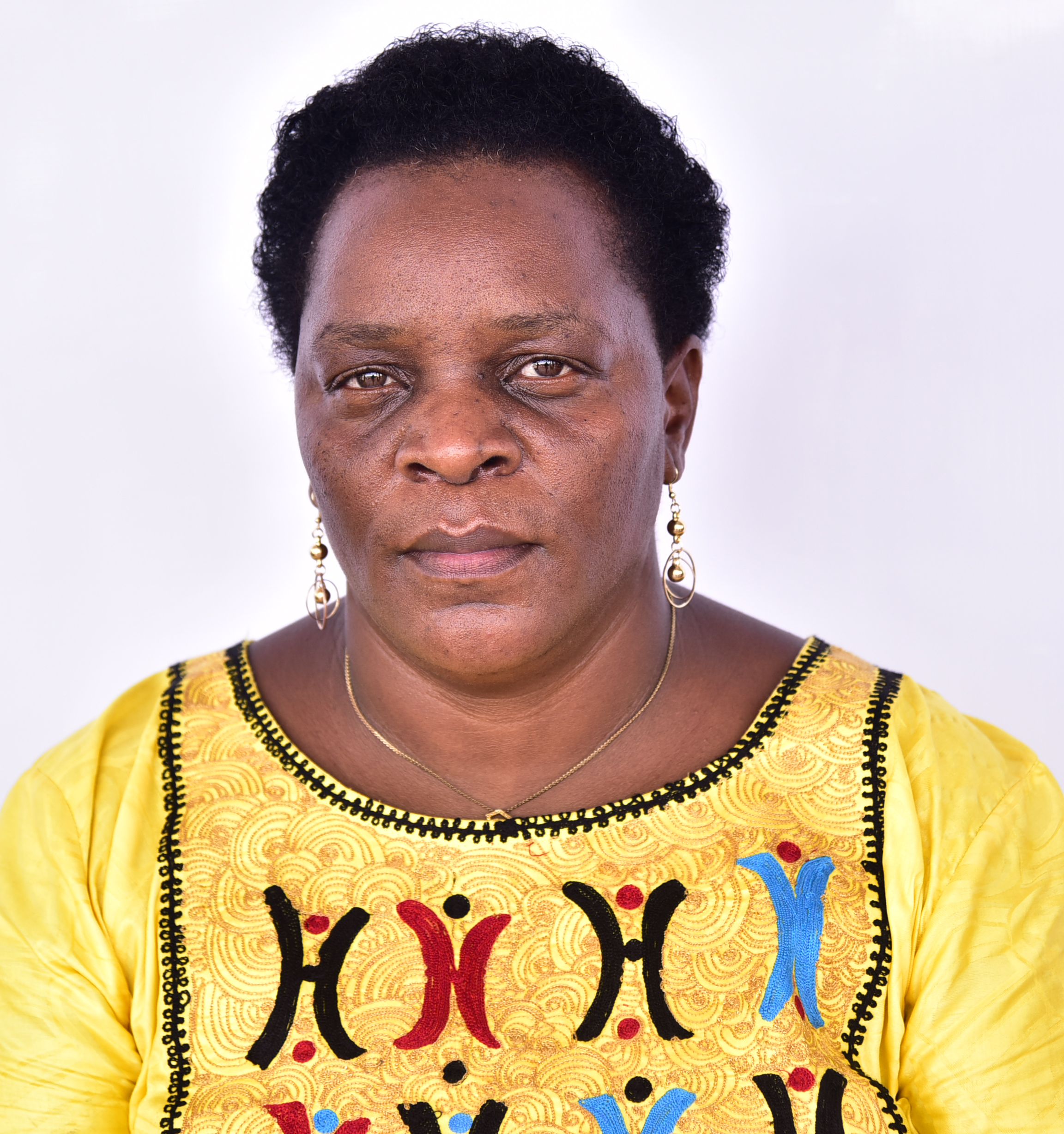
- Born: 2 May 1975 (age 51); Kabarole District, Uganda
- Citizenship: Uganda
- Education: Bishop Stuart University (Diploma in Secondary Education); Makerere University (Bachelor of Environmental Science); Uganda Management Institute (Master of Public Administration and Management)
- Occupations: Politician and Environmentalist
- Years active: 2006 — present
- Known for: Politics
- Title: State Minister for Gender and Culture

Peace Regis Mutuuzo is a Ugandan politician who serves as the Women representative for Bunyangabu District.

She served as the Minister of State for Gender and Culture in the Ugandan Cabinet for two terms, 2016-2021 and 2021-2026.

She was dropped from President Yoweri Museveni's cabinet for the term 2026-2031. In 2021, she was re elected into the eleventh Uganda Parliament.

In the 2026 January general elections, Peace Mutuuzo lost her woman member of parliament seat for Bunyangabu district to Hon. Sarah Kabarokole who stood as the National Resistance Movement (NRM) flag bearer and won the hot race that involved the National Unity Platform's flag barer Galdys Kabasinguzi and Jemimah Edith Kajumba who ran as Forum for Democratic Change (FDC) party ticket.

== Early life and education ==
Peace Mutuuzo was born on 2 May 1975 in Rwimi sub-county, Bunyangabu county, in Kabarole District, in the Western Region of Uganda. Since then, Bunyangabu county was transformed into Bunyangabu District. She studied at St. Peter and Paul Primary School, Katikamu SDA Secondary School and at Mpanga Secondary School in Fort Portal. She was the head-girl while at Mpanga.

She attended National Teachers College Kakoba (NTCK), now a component of Bishop Stuart University in Mbarara, graduating with a Diploma in Secondary Education. She served as the president of the students' guild at NTCK, while there.

She then joined Makerere University, the oldest public university in Uganda, graduating with a Bachelor of Environmental Science. Later, she obtained a Master of Public Administration and Management from Uganda Management Institute in Kampala.

== Career ==
Prior to joining active politics, Peace Mutuuzo worked with Give and Take company owned by John Sanyu Katuramu (serving life sentence in Luzira Prison) and later in the Office of the President, as the Private Secretary to the President of Uganda. In 2016, she contested for the position of Woman Representative for Kabarole District, but was defeated in the primary elections of the National Resistance Movement political party. On 6 June 2016, she was appointed State Minister for Gender and Culture.

One of the first tasks Mutuuzo embarked on in her new ministerial post is the problem sexual violence. Another item on her agenda is the planned re-development, expansion and renovation of the National Theater, which was built in 1959 and is now too small to accommodate large audiences. She is a member of the National Resistance Movement political party.

== See also ==
- Cabinet of Uganda
- Parliament of Uganda
