= Jane Aceng =

Ugandan pediatrician, politician

Jane Ruth Aceng Also known as: 1. Aceng Ocero; 2. Ceng Atedero
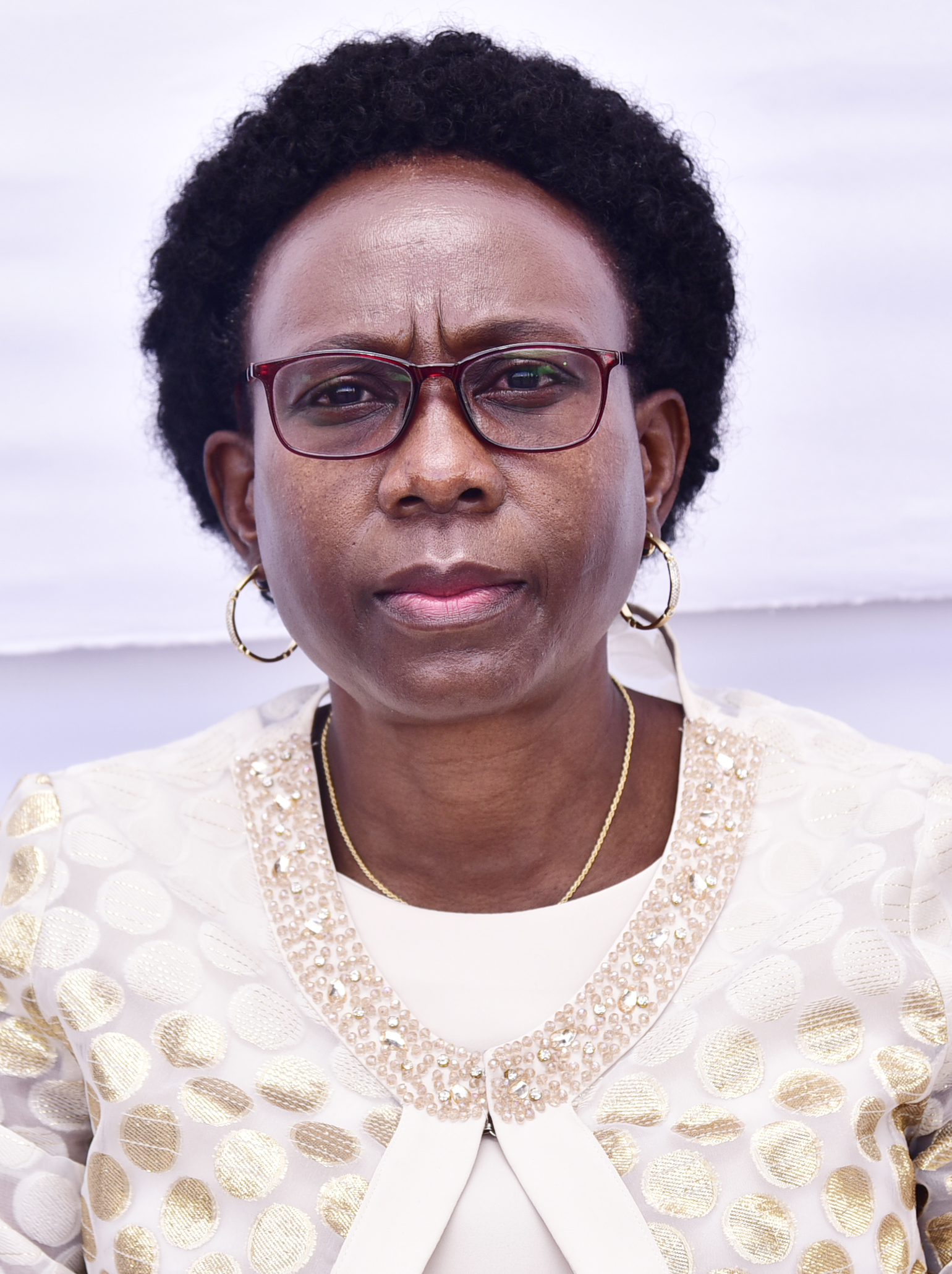
- Born: 11 May 1968 (age 58); Uganda
- Citizenship: Uganda
- Education: Makerere University (MBChB, MMed, MPH); Galilee International Management Institute (Diploma in Health Systems Management)
- Occupations: Pediatrician, researcher, medical administrator, politician
- Years active: 1995 — present
- Known for: Public service Politics
- Title: Minister of Health (2016-2026); Ugandan Cabinet Government Chief Whip; Ugandan Cabinet NRM; Chairperson
- Successor: Chris Baryomunsi
- Political party: National Resistance Movement
- Spouse: Andrew Ocero (Dr)
- Children: 2 boys and 1 girl
- Awards: African Public Health Champion of the Year (2024).
- Website: https://drjaneaceng.com/

Jane Ruth Aceng (born 11 May 1968) is a Ugandan pediatrician and politician. She was the Minister of Health in the Cabinet of Uganda. She was appointed to that position on 6 June 2016. Before that, from June 2011 until June 2016, she served as the Director General of Medical Services in the Ugandan Ministry of Health. In 2026, she was appointed as the Cabinet Minister of Information, Communications Technology and National Guidance serving in the Twelfth Parliament of Uganda following her election as the Woman Member of Parliament for Lira City in the January 2026 elections.

== Early life and education ==
Aceng was born on 11 May 1968 in Atapara village, Oyam District. She attended Shimoni Demonstration Primary School in Kampala, Uganda's capital city. She studied at Nabisunsa Girls Secondary School for both her Ordinary and Advanced Level education. She holds a Bachelor of Medicine and Bachelor of Surgery, a Master of Medicine in Pediatrics, and a Master of Public Health, all from the Makerere University College of Health Sciences. She also holds a Diploma in Health Systems Management awarded by the Galilee International Management Institute, in Israel.

=== Insight into Aceng's early life: success stories ===
Aceng spent her early childhood days in Lira (formally Lira City) living with her parents and two siblings in a small hut and she joined Amberland Primary School at around five years of age. She went up to primary three but since the father was a teacher, he got transferred to Kampala and Aceng completed her primary in Shimoni Demonstration School where her father enrolled her and other siblings. Aceng's first choice was St.Katherine secondary school but her father denied her the chance and sent her to Nabisunsa Girls’ School where she spent six years.

After sitting her exams, Aceng was the only girl who qualified for a medical course at Makerere University after the release of examinations.

=== Milestone to get Ocero Andrew (formally Doctor) ===
Aceng met Ocero Andrew as classmates after joining Makerere University in 1987. Their relationship grew and resulted in an intimate one after two years of campus (1989). And after completing their degree in 1993, they decided to marry each other.

== Genesis of profession ==
After graduation, Aceng was posted together with her husband (by then), Andrew Ocero to Lacor Hospital for internship that they completed in 1994 after a short time transfer to Mulago National Referral Hospital. Aceng and Andrew denied initial posting to Kiryandongo Hospital but asked for transfer to Lira Regional Referral Hospital where she started everything from. It was from Lira that Aceng felt welcomed although Lira Regional Referral Hospital had significantly low workers, but since Aceng and Andrew were young and energetic, they tried to fill the gap and people of the land nicknamed them as "Otin"(meaning young) doctors.

== Career ==
Aceng began serving as a medical officer in the health ministry. At the time she was appointed Director General of Medical Services, she was serving as executive director of Lira Regional Referral Hospital.

=== Political career ===
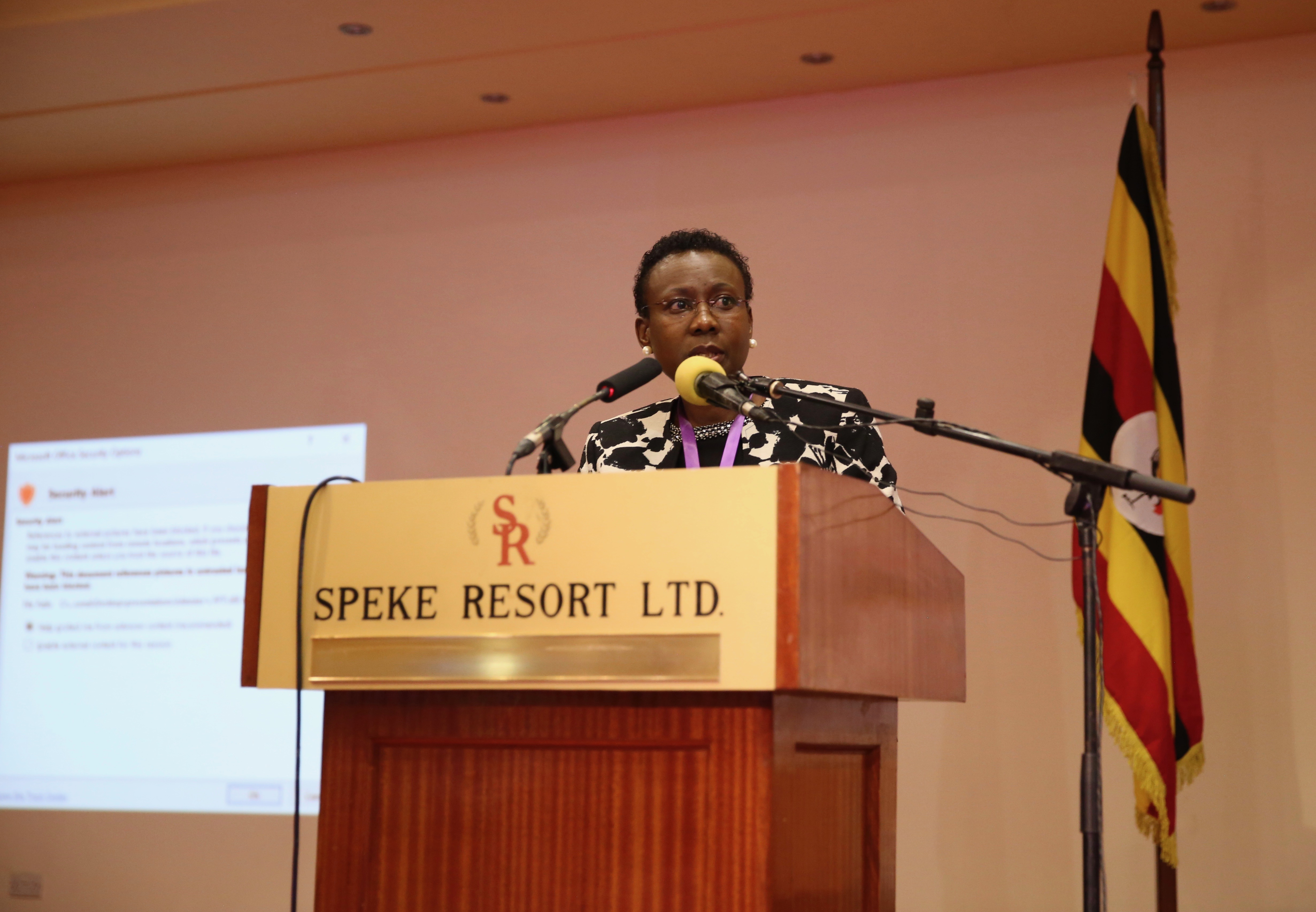
Ugandan Health Minister Dr. Jane Aceng

In July 2020, Dr. Jane Ruth Aceng declared her intentions to contest for the position of Women Representative for Lira District, in the 11th Parliament (2021 - 2026). She intends to run on the ruling National Resistance Movement political party ticket. She was an ex-officio member of parliament nominated by the President as the minister.

Aceng served in the Ministry of health even before her election as the woman member of parliament for Lira City. She was appointed by Yoweri Museveni in 2016 and later convinced by her capabilities to contest as the member of parliament in 2021. She was again entrusted back to lead ministership for the next 5 years, 2021 to 2025 after her victory by the election poll cast by the voters of Lira City, where she got 34,054 votes. Aceng later contested and worn her second election alongside her contestant Amongi Betty.

Controversy grew after Aceng's reshuffled ministerial role from Ministry of health to Ministry of information, communication technology and national guidance with Chris Baryomunsi. Aceng served for the ministerial role for only one week and she was later appointed as the government chief whip which was previously led by Justin Kasule Lumumba. As this role states that the person holding this post must be the member of parliament but Kasule was not. And this grew another national decision, and this made the president to shuffles Aceng to serve as government chief whip meanwhile Kasule was taken back to lead Information, Communication Technology and National Guidance as the minister.

Aceng is serving in Uganda's 12th Parliament for the 2026-2030 term, where she represents Lira City as the City woman MP under the National Resistance Movement party. She is also serving as the Government Chief Whip.

== Other considerations ==
Aceng is a member of the board of directors of the Infectious Diseases Institute. She also served as a member of the board of Uganda National Medical Stores, the pharmaceutical procurement and distribution arm of the health ministry, from 2005 until 2016.

== Controversy ==
As early as 2014, three variables in the national health system began to converge to the level of a crisis.

- Uganda has at least 8 public and private medical schools, graduating close to 500 medical doctors annually. Before they receive their medical licenses, each doctor has to undergo 12 months of rigorous supervision under a consultant physician or surgeon.
- Due to poor pay, dilapidated equipment, lack of resources including medication and a poor work environment, many Ugandan medical and surgical consultants have left to work in better environments in other countries.
- The small national healthcare budget leaves the health ministry with insufficient funds to pay the few consultants left, the senior house officers (SHOs) training to become consultants, and the ever-increasing number of interns working so they can get licensed.

As a consequence, the ministry of health has been pitted against the SHOs who are not compensated at all and the interns who are poorly and irregularly paid. In an attempt to conserve funds, Aceng as minister has accused some universities of graduating too many substandard doctors, although both the Uganda Medical and Dental Practitioners Council (UMDPC) and the East African Community Medical and Dental Practitioners Boards and Councils disagree with her. These are the statutory government agencies in the East African Community which are mandated to maintain the standard of medical and dental training and physician and dentist competency.

As of 2016, perhaps the most controversial of Aceng's proposals is the new requirement that interns take a new national examination, before the health ministry can assign them an internship slot. This has not gone well with the 2016/2017 intern class, prompting a lawsuit that is winding through the legal system.

== Research works ==
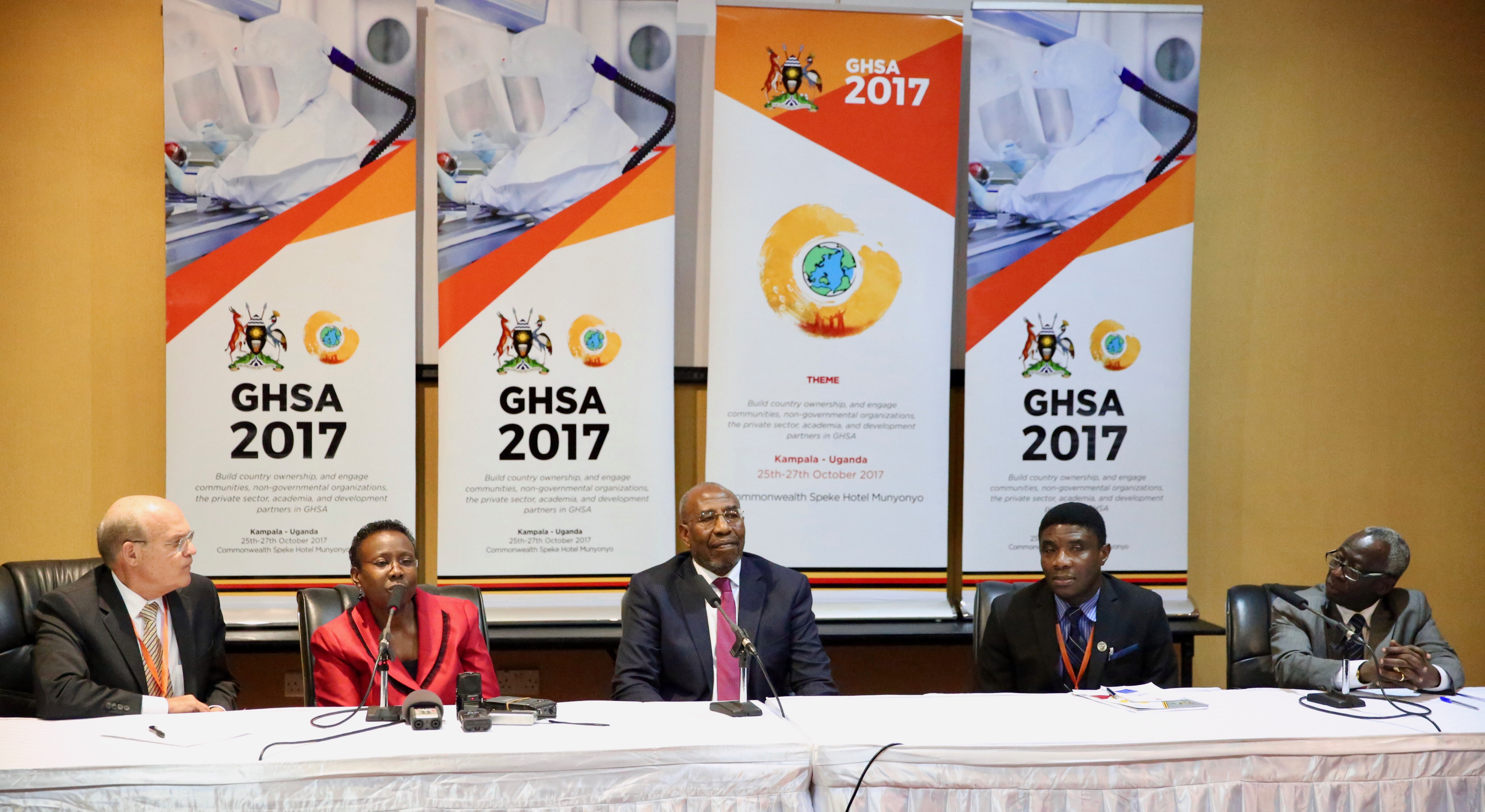
Admiral Tim Ziemer, Ugandan Prime Minister Ruhakana Rugunda, and Ugandan Health Minister Dr. Jane Ruth Aceng at closing press conference of the Global Health Security Agenda Ministerial Meeting

Aceng has participated and published widely in the field of medicine and some of her works are outlined below;

- 2021: The Ugandan Severe Acute Respiratory Syndrome -Coronavirus 2 (SARS-CoV-2) Model: A Data Driven Approach to Estimate Risk
- 2020: Estimating the Effect and Cost-Effectiveness of Facemasks in Reducing the Spread of the Severe Acute Respiratory Syndrome-Coronavirus 2 (SARS-CoV-2) in Uganda
- 2020: Family Health Days program contributions in vaccination of unreached and under-immunized children during routine vaccinations in Uganda
- 2019: Uganda's experience in Ebola virus disease outbreak preparedness, 2018–2019.
- 2018: Prevalence of protective tetanus antibodies and immunological response following tetanus toxoid vaccination among men seeking medical circumcision services in Uganda
- 2016: Tetanus Cases After Voluntary Medical Male Circumcision for HIV Prevention - Eastern and Southern Africa, 2012-2015
- 2015: Multidistrict outbreak of Marburg virus disease—Uganda, 2012.
- 2015: Is the glass half full or half empty? A qualitative exploration on treatment practices and perceived barriers to biomedical care for patients with nodding syndrome in post-conflict northern Uganda
- 2014: Ebola Viral Hemorrhagic Disease Outbreak in West Africa- Lessons from Uganda.
- 2013: Nodding syndrome in Ugandan children—clinical features, brain imaging and complications: a case series
- 2005: Rectal artemether versus intravenous quinine for the treatment of cerebral malaria in children in Uganda: randomized clinical trial

== See also ==
- Parliament of Uganda
- Ministry of Health (Uganda)
- James Makumbi
- List of members of the twelfth Parliament of Uganda
