= Bright Rwamirama =

Ugandan politician

Lieutenant Colonel Bright Rwamirama
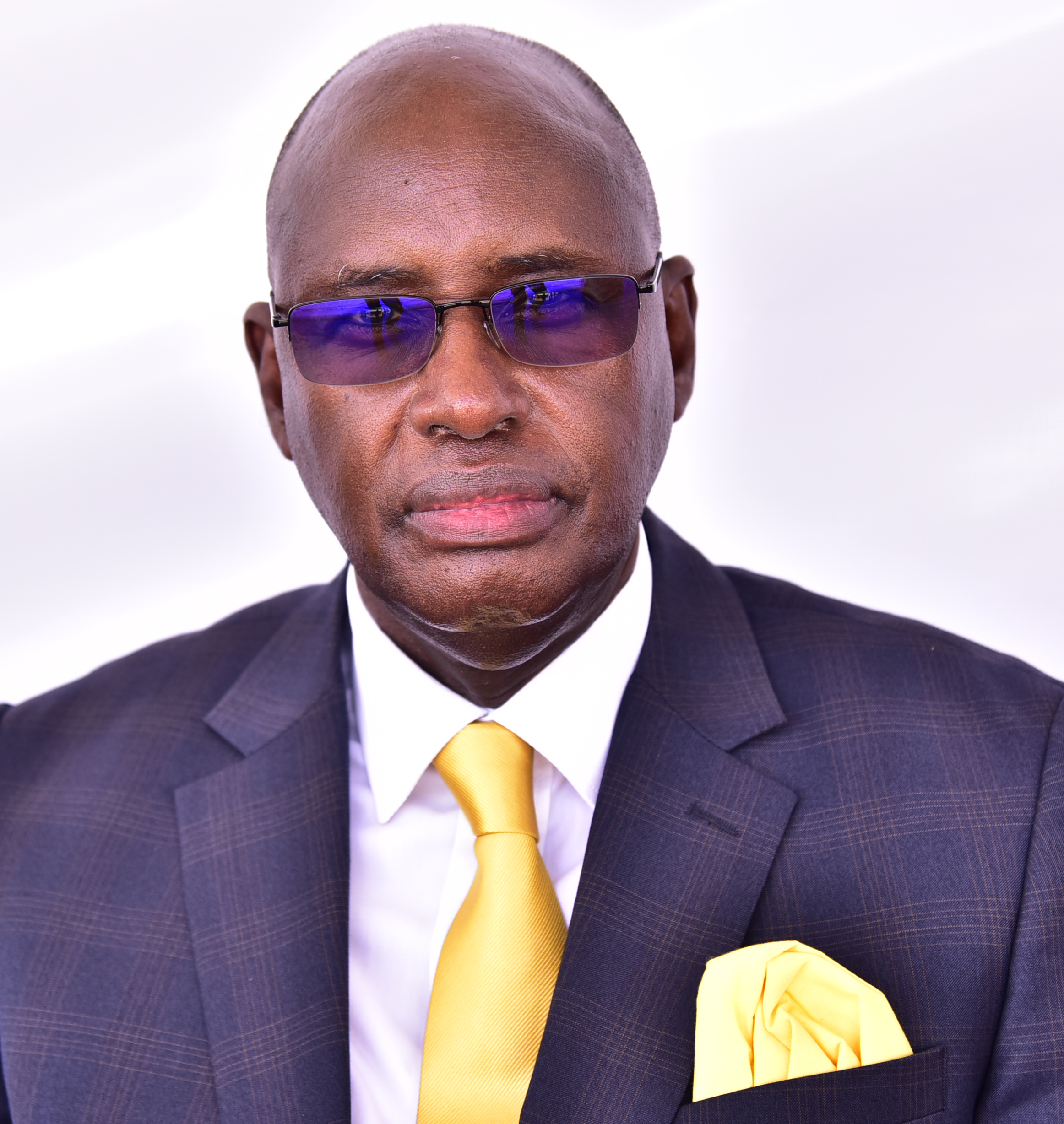

State Minister for Animal Industry

Personal details
- Born: 16 December 1954 (age 71) Uganda
- Citizenship: Uganda
- Education: Makerere University (Certificate in Management) (Bachelor of Business Administration) (Master of Business Administration); British Junior Staff College (Junior Command and Staff Course); Naval Postgraduate School (Resource Management Course)
- Occupation: Accountant & Politician
- Known for: Politics

Bright Kanyontore Rwamirama (born 16th December, 1954) is a Ugandan politician, Member of Parliament and retired army officer. He is the Minister of State for Animal Industry in the Ugandan cabinet. He was appointed to that position on 1st June, 2006. In the cabinet reshuffle of 16 February 2009, 27th May, 2011, and 1st March, 2015, he retained his cabinet post. He also serves as the elected Member of Parliament representing Isingiro County North, Isingiro District. He has served in that capacity continuously since 2001. He defeated Posiono Mugyenyi in the 2021 general election. In the 2026 general election, he was declared unopposed to retain his seat for Isingiro County North.

== Early life and education ==
Rwamirama was born on 16th December, 1954 in Isingiro District. He attended Omungyenyi Primary School for his elementary education, Mbarara High School for his O-Level education and Kololo High School for his A-Level studies. He holds the degrees of Bachelor of Business Administration (1996) and Master of Business Administration (2004), from Makerere University. His Certificate in Management was awarded in 1993, also by Makerere. He also attended the British Junior Staff College, studying the Junior Command and Staff Course and Naval Postgraduate School, studying the Resource Management Course. He obtained certificates from both courses. He is a member of the Anglican Church of Uganda.

== Career ==
From 1978 until 1983, Rwamirama worked as a Banking Officer at Uganda Commercial Bank, the institution that later became Stanbic Bank Uganda. In 1983, he joined the National Resistance Army (NRA), in the Uganda Bush War to dislodge Milton Obote from power. He was appointed Officer in Charge of Pay in the NRA in 1986, serving in that capacity until 1989. In 1989, he was promoted to Director of Finance, in the NRA, which was renamed Uganda People's Defence Force (UPDF), in 1995. He served in that capacity at the UPDF headquarters, until 1997. He continued to serve as one of the Senior Staff Officers at UPDF Headquarters, until 2001. In 2001, he retired from the Armed Forces at the rank of lieutenant colonel. He joined politics, contesting for the parliamentary seat of "Isingiro County North", in Isingiro District. He won that seat and was re-elected to the same position in 2006 and 2011. He was appointed Minister of State for Animal Industry in June 2006, a position he still occupies as of March 2015.

== Other considerations ==
Bright Rwamirama is married. He belongs to the National Resistance Movement political party. His interests include conflict resolution, community development and watching sports events.

== See also ==
- Parliament of Uganda
- Cabinet of Uganda
- Isingiro District
