= Mercy Faith Lakisa =

Ugandan politician

Hon. Mercy Faith Lakisa Mercy Faith Lakisa

Minister of State for Youth and Children’s Affairs
- President: Yoweri Museveni
- Constituency: Alebtong District (Woman MP)

Woman Member of Parliament for Alebtong District

Personal details
- Born: Uganda
- Party: National Resistance Movement (NRM)
- Education: Makerere University
- Occupation: Politician, Youth Leader
- Profession: Dental Surgeon, Politician
- Known for: Youngest minister in the 12th Parliament Cabinet

Mercy Faith Lakisa is a Ugandan politician. She is the Woman Member of Parliament for Alebtong District, a dental Surgeon, Youth Leader for Alebtong District, and Vice Guild President for 83rd at Makerere University. She was appointed the Minister of State for Youth and Children’s Affairs in the twelfth Parliament of Uganda. Lakisa's appointment as a Cabinet Minister made her the youngest minister in President Yoweri Museveni's new cabinet for the twelfth Parliament of Uganda. Her ministerial appointment has strengthened the visibility of younger leaders within government, including the establishment of a younger political class capable of sustaining the NRM’s long-term political relevance.

== Career ==
She stood for the Guild President position at Makerere University where she emerged third with 1,567 votes under a Democratic Party-leaning Independent candidate. She was the former Vice Guild President at Makerere University.

== See also ==
- Balaam Barugahara
- Muhoozi Kainerugaba
- David Kabanda

== External link by Daniel smith ochulu ==
- Mercy Faith Lakisa on X
- Website of the Parliament of Uganda
- Website of the Cabinet Ministers and Ministers of State of Uganda
- Website of the Cabinet Ministers of the Republic of Uganda
