= Florence Nambozo Wamala =

Ugandan politician

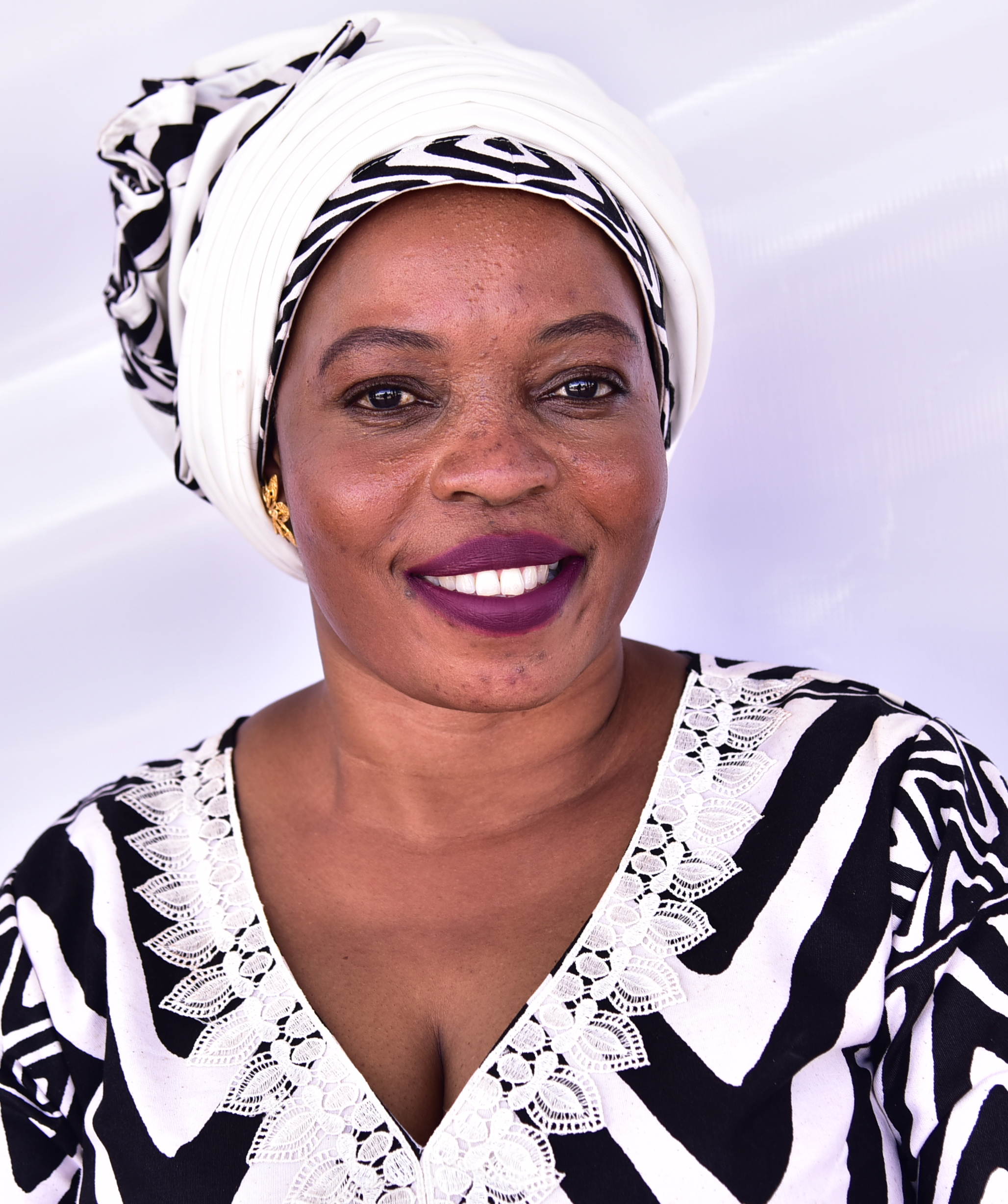
- Education: Kyambogo University
- Known for: Politics
- Title: Member of parliament

Florence Nambozo Wamala (born 14 February 1975) is a Ugandan politician and member of the parliament. She was elected as a woman Member of Parliament to represent Sironko district in 2016 Uganda general elections and was re-elected for the same post in the 2021 Uganda general elections.

== Early life and education ==
Nambozo was born on 14 February 1975. She completed her primary level education in 1989 at Nkoyoyo Boarding Primary School, Matale. In 1992, she completed her Uganda Certificate of Education (UCE) for lower secondary education at Nabumali High School .

She completed her advanced secondary level known as Uganda Advanced Certification of Education (UACE) in 2008 at Makerere Day and Evening Adult School in Kampala. In 2012 she graduated from Kyambogo University with a bachelor's degree of Arts in Education.

== Career ==
Nambozo is Chairperson of Sironko Development Network, a position she holds since 2014. She taught at Aga Khan Education Services in Uganda from 2002 to 2011 and became a member of parliament in 2016 general elections, a position she acquired again through the 2021 Uganda general elections.

== See also ==
- Sironko District
- List of members of the eleventh Parliament of Uganda
- List of members of the tenth Parliament of Uganda
- Member of Parliament
- Parliament of Uganda
