= Aisha Sekindi =

Ugandan Legislator

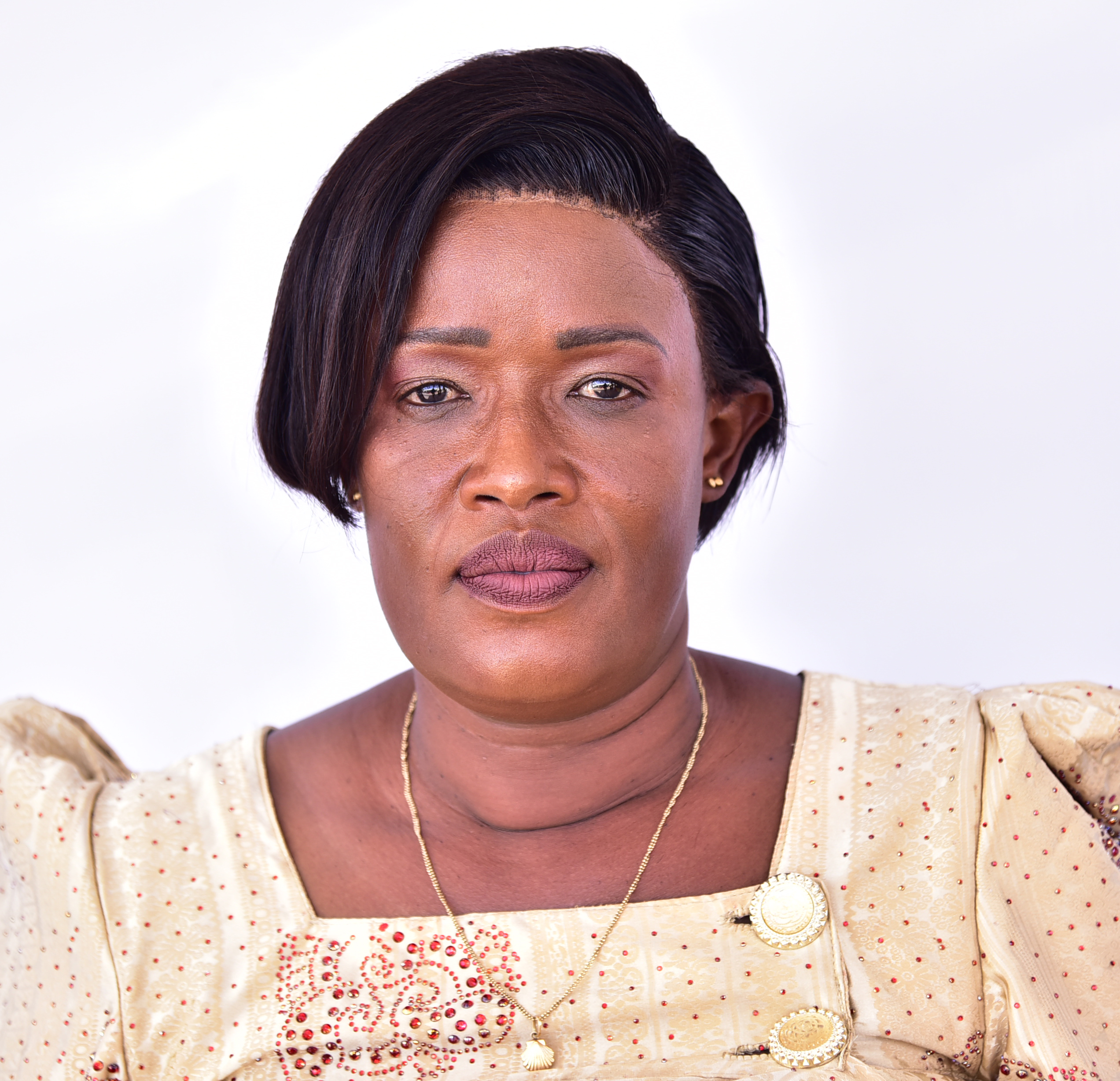
- Born: 4 December 1970 (age 55); Uganda
- Citizenship: Uganda
- Education: Muslim Primary School; Kadugala Secondary School
- Alma mater: Kibuli Teacher Training College (Certificate in Education)
- Occupations: Legislator, teacher
- Years active: 1997–present
- Known for: Politics, Education
- Title: Member of Parliament; Kalungu District Women's Constituency

Aisha Sekindi (born 4 December 1970) is a Ugandan educator and legislator. She serves as Uganda's Minister of State for Water and Environment (Water) and the woman representative for Kalungu district both in the 12th parliament and Uganda's eleventh parliament. She replaced Hon. Ronald Kibuule who handed over the office in July 2021. She held the same position in Uganda's tenth parliament. Politically, she is affiliated to the National Resistance Movement under whose ticket she contested in the 2016 general election, achieving victory over Aisha Naluyati Waligo of the Democratic Party Uganda (DP).

== Early life and education ==
Aisha Sekindi was born on 4 December 1970. She attended Kyato Muslim Primary School which she left in 1984 to join Kadugala Secondary School for her O Levels (Uganda Certificate of Education), which she obtained in 1988. Later on in 1995, she obtained a Teachers Certificate from Kibuli Teacher Training College.

== Career ==
Though Aisha Sekindi started out as a deputy headteacher at Saint Kizito Primary School, Lwengo (1997 to 2001), she moved on to becoming the Local Council V Councillor for Lwabenge and Secretary for Gender with Masaka District Local Government between 2001 and 2007.

Prior to becoming a legislator, Aisha Sekindi served as deputy Resident District Commissioner for Lira district between 2013 and 2014. Before that, she had served in the same position in Tororo District (2011 to 2013) and Kamuli District (2007 to 2011). Between 2010 and 2011, she was the Acting Resident District Commissioner for Buyende district.

As a female legislator in the tenth parliament of Uganda, she belonged to the Uganda Women Parliamentary Association (UWOPA) and is listed as a member of the committee for agriculture.

Towards the 2026 general elections, Sekindi shunned the NRM primaries and declared her plans to contest as an independent candidate in the general election, claiming to have gotten information about a plot to rig her out.The primaries were won by Hellen Nakeeya..She went on to win the Kalungu District Women parliamentary seat as an independent candidate.

== Controversies ==
Waliggo Aisha Nuluyati of DP filed a case against Aisha Sekindi to the high court alleging that Sekindi did not have the necessary academic qualifications for the woman Member of Parliament (MP) position she was elected to. Despite these allegations, Sekindi was declared the rightful woman MP for Kalungu District after the 2016 elections. In March 2023, Aisha Sekindi's name also surfaced in connection with the Karamoja iron sheets saga, where she was among the 30 Members of Parliament (MPs) implicated. The scandal involved allegations of misappropriation of funds meant for the procurement and distribution of iron sheets to disadvantaged communities in the Karamoja region of Uganda.

== See also ==
- Parliament of Uganda
- List of members of the tenth Parliament of Uganda
- Lira District
- Tororo District
- Kamuli District
- Kalungu District
