= Amos Lugoloobi =

Ugandan minister of state for finance

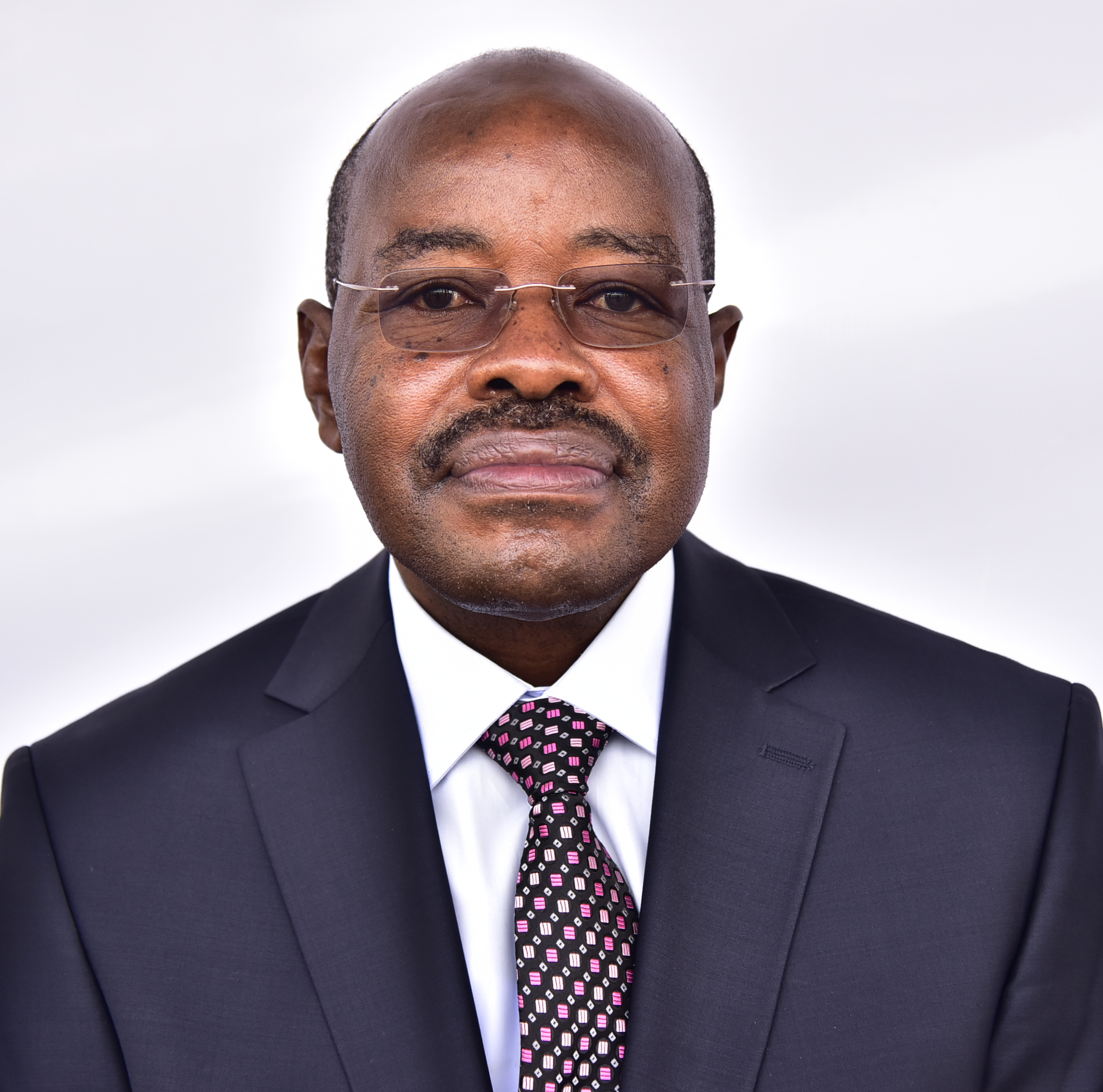

State Minister of Finance, Planning and Economic Development
- Incumbent
- Assumed office 2021

Member of Parliament
- Incumbent
- Assumed office 2021

Personal details
- Born: 21 June 1961 (age 65) Kayunga District, Uganda
- Party: National Resistance Movement
- Spouse: Evelyne Nakimera
- Education: Eastern and Southern African Management Institute

Amos Lugoloobi (born 21 June 1961) is a Ugandan politician. He is currently the state minister for finance and planning and the representative member for Ntenjeru north, Kayunga District in the Ugandan 11th Parliament.

In October 2023, he was charged with corruption-related offense related to stealing iron sheets, something which multiple government officials have been implicated. He continued to maintain his innocence and subsequently the trial was halted after the office of the director of public prosecution (DPP) dropped the charges earlier preferred against him at the Anti-Corruption Court in Kampala.

Lugoloobi remains sanctioned by the United States department of state and the United Kingdom together with his spouse and other high ranking government officials such as speaker of Parliament Anita Annet Among, former deputy CDF Lt. Gen. Peter Elwelu, former state minister for Karamoja affairs Agnes Nandutu, and former minister Mary Gorreti Kitutu

== Early life and education ==
Lugoloobi was born on 21 June 1961 to Bwogi, a former UTV director and Mary Bwogi in Kayunga District. He holds a bachelor's degree in economics from Makerere University and a master's degree in Business Administration from the Eastern and Southern African Management Institute (ESAMI).

== Career ==
He is a politician and he is affiliated to National Resistance Movement and a member of parliament. He runs personal projects relating to clean water, games and sports, health, education, student sponsorship programs and livelihood enhancement initiatives such as bore hall drilling and repair.

== Parliamentary duties ==
He is an active member of the business committee, committee of finance, planning and economic development and the budgets committee. He is currently the state minister for finance.

== Personal details ==
Lugoloobi is married to Evelyne Nakimera.
