= Monica Musenero =

Ugandan veterinarian and epidemiologist

- Born: 1967 (age 58–59); Petete, Butebo District, Uganda
- Education: Nabumali High School (High School Diploma); Makerere University (Bachelor of Veterinary Medicine) (Master of Public Health); Cornell University (Master of Science in Microbiology & Immunology)
- Occupations: Veterinarian, Microbiologist, and Epidemiologist
- Years active: 1998–present
- Spouse: (Michael Masanza)

Monica Musenero Masanza (born circa 1967) is a Ugandan veterinarian, microbiologist and epidemiologist, who serves as the Minister of Energy and Mineral development, earlier she served as the Minister of Science, Technology and innovation. as a consultant epidemiologist to the government of Uganda and serves as an advisor to the president of Uganda on epidemics and pandemics. She previously served as the Principal Epidemiologist and Assistant Commissioner for Epidemiology and Surveillance in the Uganda Ministry of Health. She has previously played leading roles in the control of Ebola epidemics in Uganda, the Democratic Republic of the Congo and in the West African country of Sierra Leone.

== Early life and education ==
Musenero was born in present-day Butebo District (formerly part of Pallisa District), in the Eastern Region of Uganda. She started School at Kodiri Primary School and later moved to Kalalaka Primary School where she sat her Primary Leaving Examinations (PLE). After she joined Bubulo Girls High School for her O-Level studies. She then attended Nabumali High School, where she completed her A-Level education and graduated with a High School Diploma, in 1987.

She was then admitted to Makerere University, Uganda's largest and oldest public university, graduating with a Bachelor of Veterinary Medicine degree. Later, she was awarded a Master of Public Health degree, also by Makerere University. She also holds a Master of Science degree in Microbiology and Immunology, awarded by Cornell University, in 1997.

== Career ==
Monica Musenero started her career at Makerere University in 1992 where she served as a Teaching Assistant at Faculty of Veterinary Medicine. At first She taught Veterinary Pharmacology, Physiology, Biochemistry, but later switched to Microbiology, immunology and Molecular Biology after completing her Postgraduate studies in USA.

In 2003, Musenero joined Makerere School of Public Health for a Master of Public Health (MPH) and specialized in Epidemic Control. She joined the Uganda Ministry of Health first as a Fellow and later was appointed as an Epidemiologist and later Principal Epidemiologist at the Ministry's Epidemiology and Surveillance Division.

In 2008, Musenero was employed by the African Field Epidemiology Network (AFENET), as a Consultant Epidemiologist and Senior Program Officer, based in Kampala, Uganda. In 2011, she joined SDS (Strengthening Decentralization for Sustainability) Project as was Regional Director for Central Uganda, serving in that capacity until 2013.

In 2014 she responded to a request responded to a call to support the Ebola affected countries and travelled to Sierra Leone where she served as a Consultant and later Field Coordinator for the World Health Organization, during the Ebola virus epidemic in Sierra Leone. She served briefly as the Assistant Commissioner, Epidemiology and Surveillance at the Ministry of Health in Uganda, in 2015, but was requested to return to Sierra Leone to continue supporting the Ebola response until 2017.

In 2018 and 2019 she served as a Consultant on Ebola Response in DRC and Rwanda.

== Other considerations ==
In 2014, during the Ebola outbreak in Guinea, Liberia and Sierra Leone, after Musenero had retired from the Uganda Ministry of Health, she was recalled to "offer technical advice in West Africa, because of her experience in handling Ebola".

In early 2020, before Uganda recorded her first COVID-19 patient, Dr Musenero was appointed as a senior advisor to the president of Uganda, regarding the pandemic. She led a team of professionals and technocrats who planned strategy and advised the president on the way forward.

== Family ==
Monica Musenero is married to Michael Masanza and together are the parents of three children.

== See also ==
- Health in Uganda
