= Sam Mayanja =

Ugandan politician

Hon. Sam Mayanja

Attorney General of Uganda
- Incumbent
- Assumed office May 2026
- President: Yoweri Museveni
- Preceded by: Kiryowa Kiwanuka

State Minister for Lands
- In office June 2021 – May 2026
- President: Yoweri Museveni
- Preceded by: Persis Namuganza

Personal details
- Born: 1959 (age 66–67) Kiyinda, Mityana District, Uganda
- Citizenship: Ugandan
- Party: National Resistance Movement: Makerere University (LLB, LLM); Law Development Centre (Dip. LP); Northwestern Christian University (PhD)
- Profession: Lawyer; Academic; Politician

Sam Mayanja (born 1959) is a Ugandan lawyer and politician who has been appointed by President of Uganda Yoweri Museveni as Attorney General for the period 2026–2031. He served as State minister for Lands where he handled land matters across the country and resolved land conflicts in different parts of Uganda. He served as the principal partner of Sam Mayanja Company Advocates with his main focus on the banking and financial sector, and was a co-founder of the Kampala Associated Advocates law firm in Uganda.

== Education and background ==
Sam Mayanja was born in Kiyinda, Mityana district in central Uganda. Mayanja started his educational career in Mityana primary school, and moved to Lubiri Secondary School, and later Buddo Secondary School. He joined Makerere University law school to pursue his law degree, he later enrolled for a post graduate study at the Law Development Centre and later pursued a Master's degree in Law and legal practice from Makerere University. He attained a Doctorate of Philosophy in Leadership, Management and Administration from Northwestern Christian University.

== Career ==
Mayanja served as a lecturer at Law Development Centre from 1977 to 1981, and served as bank secretary at Uganda Development bank from 1989 to 1999. He also served at United Nations Economic Commission for Africa (UNECA) as the Legal Advisor for the Transcontinental Highway from Lagos to Mombasa, legal consultant at the World Bank, Northern Corridor and Transit Organization, and has also lectured at Uganda Christian University. He is a lecturer at Nkumba University. He is a member of Uganda Law Society and East Africa Law Society.

== Personal life ==
Mayanja is a Pentecostal Christian who often visits churches around Kampala and preaches the word of God.

== Accomplishments ==
Mayanja in his work as Minister for Lands cancelled fradulently acquired land titles in Kakumiro district, halted illegal land fees to protect residents of Kassanda district and resolved land conflicts in Wakiso district.

== Controversy ==
He has been sued by Kabaka of Buganda legal team for land matters regarding Mailo land systems in the Buganda Kingdom. He has also been told by court that he has no power to direct police. He ordered over 300 evictees to return to their ancestral land
