= Peter Ogwang =

Ugandan politician

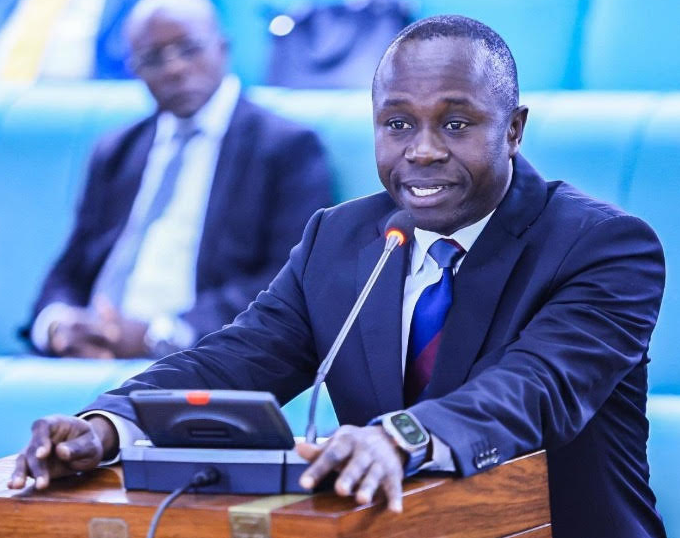
- Hon. Peter Ogwang on the floor of Parliament
- Born: 15 December 1983 (age 42); Uganda
- Citizenship: Uganda
- Education: Makerere Institute of Social Development (Certificate in Social Work and Social Administration) (Diploma in Social Work and Social Administration); Victoria University Uganda (Bachelor of Social Work and Social Administration)
- Occupation: Politician
- Years active: 2007 — present
- Known for: Politics
- Title: Minister of State for Sports

Peter Ogwang (born 15 December 1983) is a Ugandan politician. He is the current Minister of State for Sports in the Ugandan Cabinet. He was appointed to that position on 22 July 2022, replacing Denis Hamson Obua. Previously, he was the State Minister for Economic Monitoring and had earlier served as the State Minister for Information, Communication, ICT and National Guidance. He is also the elected Member of Parliament for Ngariam County in Katakwi District, in the 12th Parliament (2026-2031 ).

== Early life and education ==
Ogwang was born on 15 December 1983 in Katakwi District. He attended Moruapesur Primary School. He studied at Soroti Secondary School, for his O-Level studies, obtaining a Uganda Certificate of Education from there. He transferred to Tororo Progressive Academy, where he completed his A-Level education, graduating with a Uganda Advanced Certificate of Education, in 2001.

He holds a Certificate and a Diploma in Social Work and Social Administration, both awarded by Makerere Institute for Social Development (affiliated with Makerere University Business School). As of February 2020, he was pursuing a degree of Bachelor of Social Work and Social Administration from Victoria University Uganda.

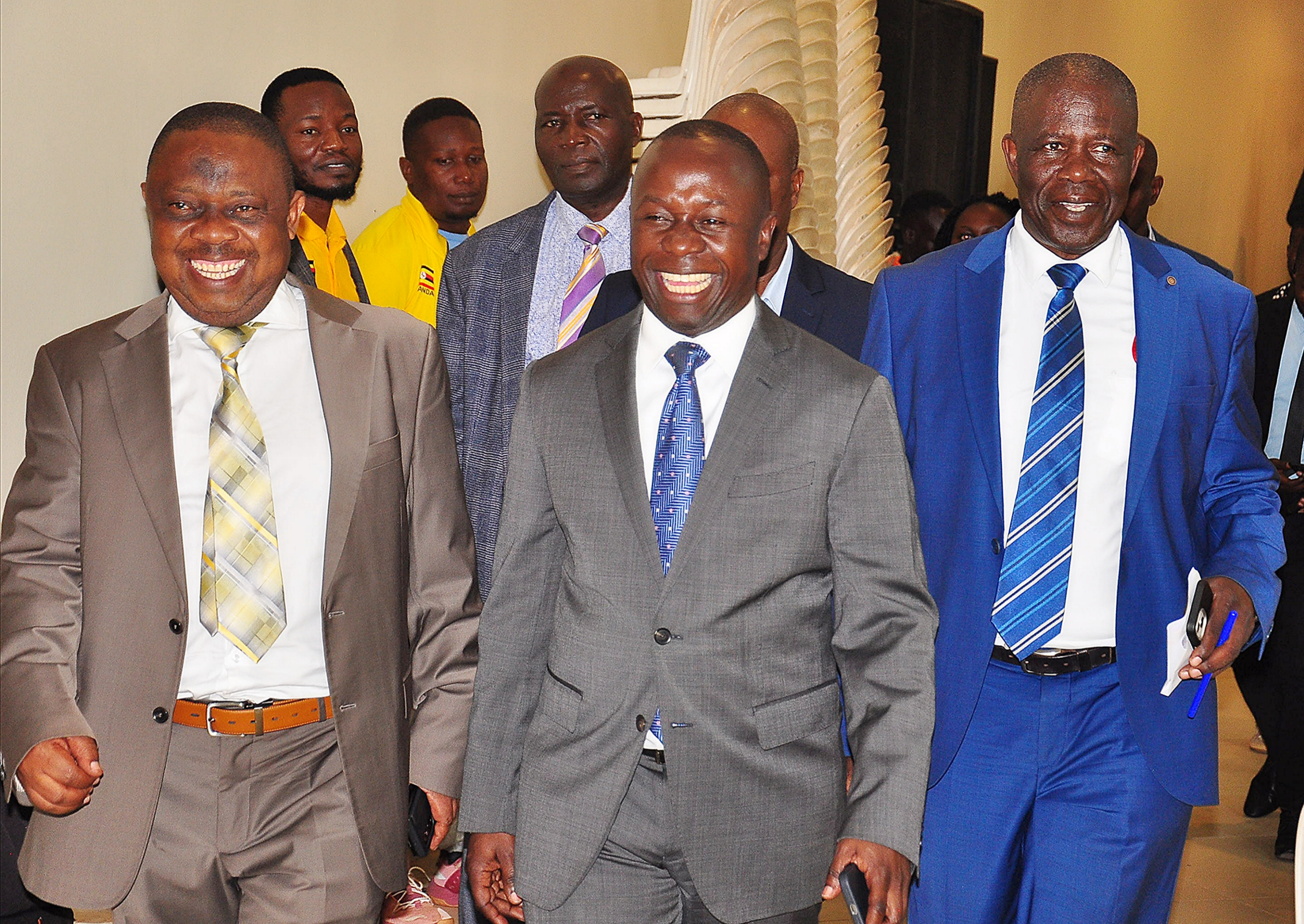
The has three crucial men in Uganda, Justus Mugisha (left), Hon. Peter Ogwang (middle) and Christopher Mugisha Banage (right) the CEO of USSSA

== Career ==
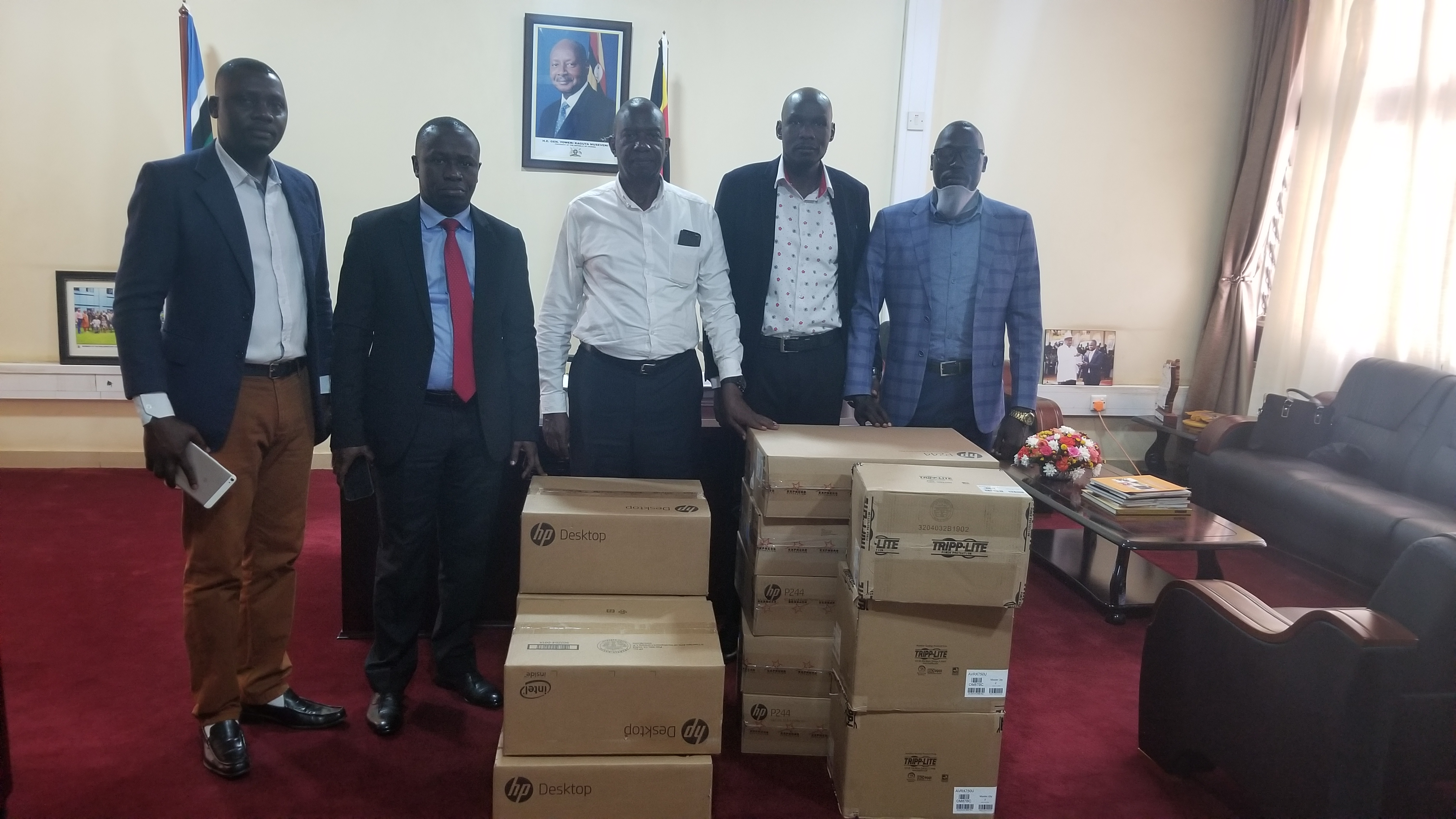
Peter Ogwang In a Group Photo

From 2007 until 2010, Ogwang was employed as an Assistant Private Secretary to the President of Uganda at State House. In 2011, he successfully contested for the Eastern Uganda Youth Parliamentary seat, on the ruling National Resistance Movement political party ticket. He won and represented the youth in the 9th Parliament (2011-2016). In 2016-2021, he was elected MP for Usuk County.

In a cabinet reshuffle, on 14 December 2019, Peter Ogwang was named to the cabinet. After parliamentary approval, he swore in as State Minister for Information, Communication, ICT and National Guidance, on 13 January 2020. He is the elected Member of Parliament for Ngariam County in Katakwi District, in the 12th Parliament (2026-2031).

== Personal details ==
Peter Ogwang is married.

== Parliamentary duties ==
He has the following additional parliamentary responsibilities: He is a member of the Committee on Presidential Affairs and is also a member of the Parliamentary Budget Committee.

== See also ==
- Districts of Uganda
- Katakwi District
