= Ministry of ICT and National Guidance =

Government ministry of Uganda

Coordinates: 00°18′48″N 32°34′55″E

Ministry of Information and Communications Technology
- Coat of Arms of Uganda

Ministry overview
- Type: Ministry
- Jurisdiction: Government of Uganda
- Headquarters: 10-12 Parliament Avenue; Kampala, Uganda
- Ministry executive: Chris Baryomunsi, Minister of Information and Communications Technology
- Website: Homepage

The Ministry of ICT and National Guidance (formerly the Ministry of Information and Communications Technology) is a cabinet ministry of Uganda. The ministry is headed by Hon. Justine Kasule Lumumba.

== Location ==
The headquarters of the ministry are located at ICT House, 10-12 Parliament Avenue, in Kampala Central Division, in the capital city of Kampala. The coordinates of the headquarters of the ministry are 00°18'49.0"N, 32°35'13.0"E (Latitude:0.313622; Longitude:32.586938).

== Overview ==
The ICT ministry was created in 2006. The ministry is mandated to provide leadership, coordination, support, and advocacy in the formulation of policies, laws, regulations, and strategies for Uganda’s ICT sector, thereby fostering the achievement of national development goals. Ruth Nankabinwa, the current ICT cabinet minister, has set a medium-term goal for Uganda to join the six leading African countries in the ICT sector.

== List of ministers ==
=== Minister of ICT and National Guidance ===
- Chris Baryomunsi (8 June 2021 - present)

=== Minister of Information and Communications Technology ===
- Judith Nabakooba (14 December 2019 - 6 June 2021)
- Frank Tumwebaze (6 June 2016 - 14 December 2019)

- Dr. Ham Mukasa Mulira - Pioneer Cabinet Minister of ICT.

=== Minister for Information and National Guidance ===
- Jim Muhwezi (1 March 2015 - 6 June 2016)
- Rose Namayanja (23 May 2013 - 1 March 2015)
- Mary Karooro Okurut (27 May 2011 - 23 May 2013)
- Kabakumba Masiko (16 February 2009 - 27 May 2011)

== Auxiliary institutions and allied agencies ==
1. National Information Technology Authority - Uganda (NITAU)
2. Uganda Communications Commission
3. Uganda Broadcasting Corporation
4. Posta Uganda
5. Uganda Institute of Information & Communications Technology (UICT)

== See also ==
- Government of Uganda
- Cabinet of Uganda
- List of mobile network operators in Uganda
