= Maggie Magode Ikuya =

Ugandan politician

Maggie Magode Ikuya sometimes referred to as James Magode Ikuya is a Ugandan politician and activist. He is the State Minister for East African Community Affairs.

== Personal life ==
He comes from the Magodes Town Council in Tororo North County, Tororo District. However, he lived his entire adult life among the Bagusi community in Mbale District. He is married to two women and his wives hail from Sironko- Bududa and Budadili.

== Career ==
Maggie has worked with Uganda People's Congress (UPC), FRONASA and National Resistance Movement (NRM). When he was appointed as the State Minister, he mentioned that his appointment was an indication that the voice of the people who had been involved in the liberation struggle has finally been heard by the government.

== See also ==
- Cabinet of Uganda
- Parliament of Uganda
- National Resistance Movement
- Uganda People's Congress
