= Ministry of Health (Uganda) =

Government ministry of Uganda

Coordinates: 00°18′48″N 32°34′55″E

- Coat of Arms of Uganda

Ministry overview
- Type: Ministry
- Jurisdiction: Government of Uganda
- Headquarters: 6 Lourdel Road, Wandegeya Kampala, Uganda
- Ministry executive: Jane Aceng, Minister of Health
- Website: Homepage

The Ministry of Health is a cabinet-level government ministry of Uganda. It is responsible for planning, delivering, and maintaining an efficient and effective healthcare delivery system, including preventive, curative, and rehabilitative services, in a humane, affordable, and sustainable manner. The ministry is headed by Minister of Health Jane Aceng.

== Location ==
The headquarters of the ministry are located at Plot 6 Lourdel Road, in the Wandegeya neighborhood, Kampala Central Division, in Kampala, Uganda's capital and largest city, about 2.5 kilometres (2 mi) north of the city's business district. The coordinates of the building are 0°19'59.0"N, 32°34'39.0"E (Latitude:0.333044; Longitude:32.577486).

== Subministries ==
- State Minister for Health (General Duties)
- State Minister for Primary Healthcare - Joyce Moriku.

== List of ministers ==
- Chris Baryomunsi (8 June 2026–present)
- Jane Aceng (6 June 2016–8 June 2026)
- Elioda Tumwesigye (1 March 2015 - 6 June 2016)
- Vacant (18 September 2014 - 1 March 2015)
- Ruhakana Rugunda (23 May 2013 - 18 September 2014)
- Christine Ondoa (27 May 2011 - 23 May 2013)
- Stephen Mallinga (1 June 2006 - 27 May 2011)
- Jim Muhwezi (2001 - 1 June 2006)
- Henry Kyemba, 1970s

== See also ==
- Politics of Uganda
- List of hospitals in Uganda
