= Chris Baryomunsi =

Ugandan politician

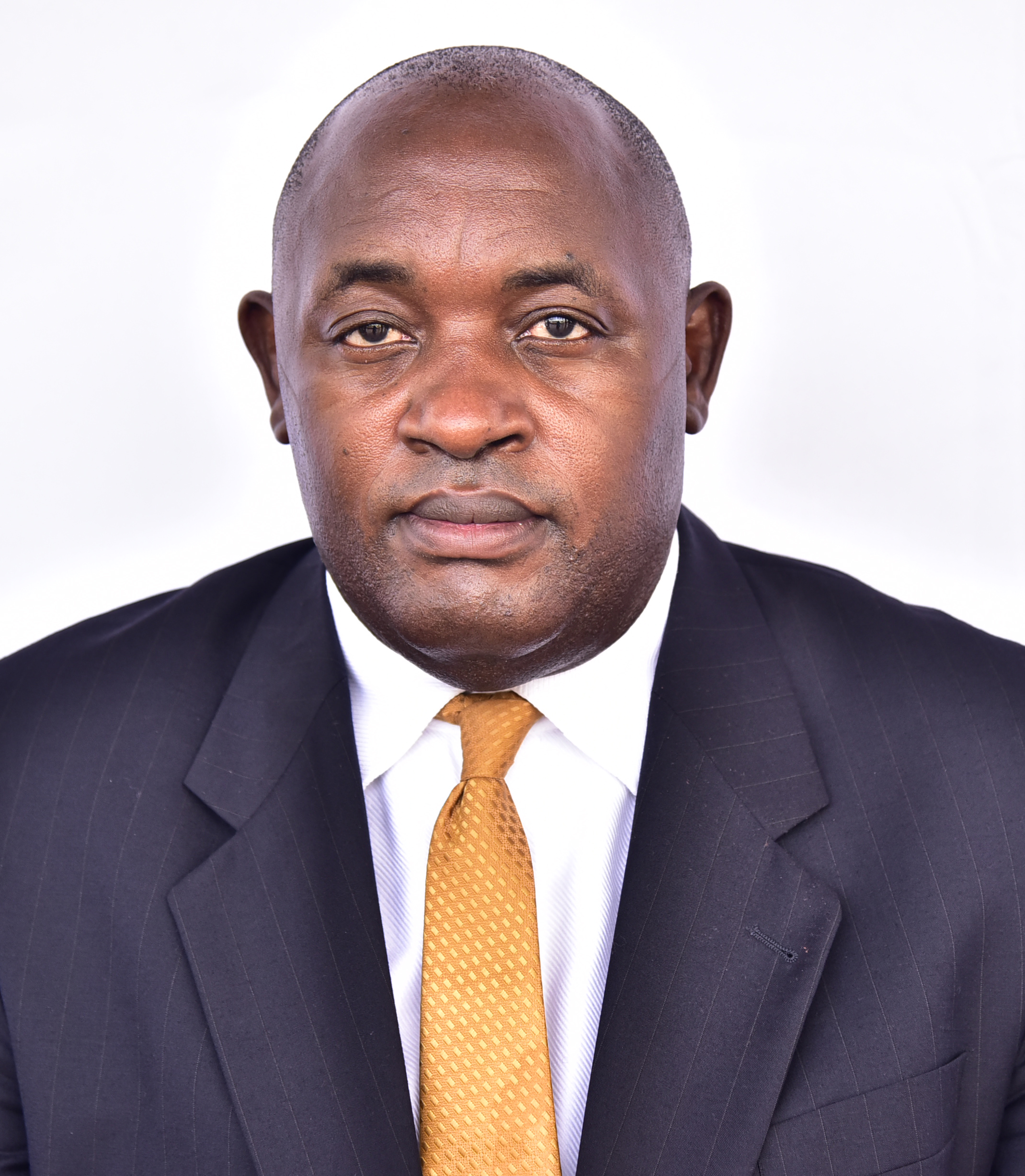

Cabinet Minister of Health Ugandan Cabinet
- Incumbent
- Assumed office 8 June 2026
- Preceded by: Jane Ruth Aceng

Personal details
- Born: Chris Baryomunsi; 9 December 1969 (age 56) Kanungu, Uganda
- Citizenship: Ugandan
- Other political affiliations: National Resistance Movement
- Spouse: Fosca Twebaze
- Education: Makerere University (Bachelor of Medicine and Bachelor of Surgery) (Postgraduate Diploma in Demography) (Master of Arts in Demography); University of Brighton (Postgraduate Diploma in HIV/AIDS Management); Atlantic International University (PhD in Public Health)
- Occupation: Physician, politician
- Known for: HIV/AIDS Management, politics

Chris Baryomunsi (born 9 December 1969) is a Ugandan physician, public health specialist, demographer, and politician who currently serves as the Minister of Health in the Cabinet of Uganda, a portfolio he was sworn into in June 2026. He is the former Minister for ICT and National Guidance. He was appointed to that position in 2021. From 1 March 2015 until 6 June 2016, he served as State Minister of Health for General Duties. He currently serves as the minister for health in Uganda.

Baryomunsi is the elected member of Parliament for Kinkizi County East and a member of Uganda's ruling party, the National Resistance Movement.

== Early life and education ==
Baryomunsi was born on born 9 December 1969 in Murama Village, Nyakishenyi, Rukungiri District, to the late Aloysius Mpungirehe and the late Rosaria Kamayangi.

In 1971, when Chris was two years old, his parents migrated to Kayungwe, Rugyeyo in present-day Kanungu District. Baryomunsi attended Kayungwe Primary School for his primary education and St. Paul's Seminary, Kabale for his O-Level and A-Level education. He was admitted to Makerere University, the largest public university in Uganda, to study human medicine. In 1995, he graduated with a Bachelor of Medicine and Bachelor of Surgery degree. In 1997, he was awarded the Postgraduate Diploma in demography, and in 1998, he received a Master of Arts in demography, all from Makerere. In 2003, he received the Postgraduate Diploma in HIV/AIDS Management from the University of Brighton. In 2016, he obtained a PhD in Public Health majoring in Maternal Health from Atlantic International University, USA.

== Medical career ==
From 1995 until 1998, he worked as a medical officer at Mulago Hospital. From 1999 to 2002, he worked as a reproductive health adviser for Deutsche Gesellschaft für Internationale Zusammenarbeit. He later worked as a reproductive health adviser for UNFPA between 2002 and 2006. He also worked as a lecturer at Makerere University between 2000 and 2006.

== Political career ==
Baryomunsi began his political career in high school, where he served as the elected minister for education at St. Paul's Seminary from 1988 to 1990. While at Makerere University in the early 1990s, he was the finance secretary for the Federation of African Medical Students' Association and the secretary for finance for the Makerere University Medical Students' Association. In 2005, he was appointed as a United Nations Population Fund HIV/AIDS Advisor for Harare. He turned down the job so that he could contest in the 2006 Ugandan parliamentary election. He ran as the NRM political party candidate for the Kinkiizi County East constituency in Kanungu District and was elected to Parliament.

He was also elected president of the African Parliamentarians Forum on Population and Development. While in Parliament, he served on the Social Services Committee and has served on the Health and HIV/AIDS Committees to date. He also has served as a parliamentary commissioner for NRM in the Parliament of Uganda from June 2011 to April 2014.

On 1 March 2015, he was appointed as State Minister of Health for General Duties.

On 6 June 2016, he was appointed State Minister for Housing.

In May 2021, he was appointed Minister of Information, Communications Technology And National Guidance.

In 26 May 2026, he was appointed cabinet minster for health, and sworn in on 8 June.

== Other considerations ==
He is known to be an independent thinker, who is not afraid to disagree with his party when it diverts "from pro-people issues".

Previously, he has served in the following capacities:

- Vice chairperson of HIV/AIDS and Health Committees, in the Parliament
- Chairman of the board of directors of the AIDS Information Centre
- Technical advisor on HIV and AIDS, GTZ
- Programme advisor, United Nations Population Fund
- Member of the Parliamentary Budget Committee
- President of the African Parliamentarians Forum on Population and Development
- President, Rotary Club of Kabarole

== Personal details ==
A Mukiga by ethnicity, he was born and raised in a Roman Catholic family. His father converted to Catholicism in the early 1950s, despite having been raised in a Protestant household.

Baryomunsi is married to Fosca Twebaze and they have two children.

== Articles, interviews and publications ==
- SAHARA-J: Journal of Social Aspects of HIV/AIDS
- Uganda Draws Back from the AIDS Brink
- Chris Baryomunsi (Uganda), Habitat III, 4th Plenary meeting

== See also ==
- Nakaseke District
- Kanungu District
