= Nyasio Mudimi =

Ugandan politician

Member of Parliament Elgon County

Nyasio Mudimi is a Ugandan politician. He contested in the 2026 January Elections in Uganda to represent the constituents of Elgon County as an independent Member of Parliament. In his previous term as Member of Parliament, landslides affected the people of his constituency and together with the Ministry of Disaster preparedness rescued affected families who were ready to be relocated.

== Controversy ==
Nyasio Mudimi was summoned by the CID investigation department of police to file a statement regarding a corruption allegation.

== See also ==
- Anita Among
- Sarah Achieng Opendi
- Idah Nantaba
