= Grace Kiirya Wanzala =

Ugandan politician

Member of Parliament for Butembe County
- Incumbent
- Assumed office 2026
- Constituency: Butembe County

Personal details
- Born: 18 March 1968 (age 58) Butembe County, Jinja District, Uganda
- Occupation: Politician, Teacher
- Known for: Persistent parliamentary candidate, elected after multiple attempts

Grace Kiirya Wanzala, also known as Grace Paddy Kirya Wanzala (born on 18 March 1968), is a Ugandan politician and teacher. He is currently serving as the Butembe County Member of Parliament in Jinja District.

== Personal life and education ==
He is from Butembe County in Jinja District.

== Career ==
In 2026, he won the Butembe County seat after four unsuccessful bids, making it to the 12th Parliament of Uganda.

He entered active politics immediately after finishing his University studies, serving as the youth chairperson of Busedde Sub-county. He started his political career with the Forum for Democratic Change (FDC). He later served as a district councillor for Jinja District for three consecutive terms. He was also a former councillor for the Greater Jinja District.

He took an interest in representing Butembe County in Parliament in 2001, where he contested against the former Energy Minister Daudi Migereko but lost. In 2006, he returned to the race and lost by 600 votes, and again lost in 2011 by 700 votes to Daudi Migereko, who was serving as the Minister for Lands. In 2016, he lost to Nelson Lufafa of the National Resistance Movement (NRM) by 2,000 votes. In 2021, he lost to David Livingstone Zijjan by just 16 votes. In the 2026 elections, he finally won with 6,215 votes, followed by Jacob Kabondo from the National Resistance Movement with 5,799 votes, while Independent candidate, Okum Shaban received 4,798 votes. He is the Forum for Democratic Change chairman for Jinja District.

== See also ==
- List of members of the twelfth Parliament of Uganda
- Namatende Eunice
- Daudi Migereko
- Balyeku Moses Grace
