= Persis Namuganza =

Ugandan politician

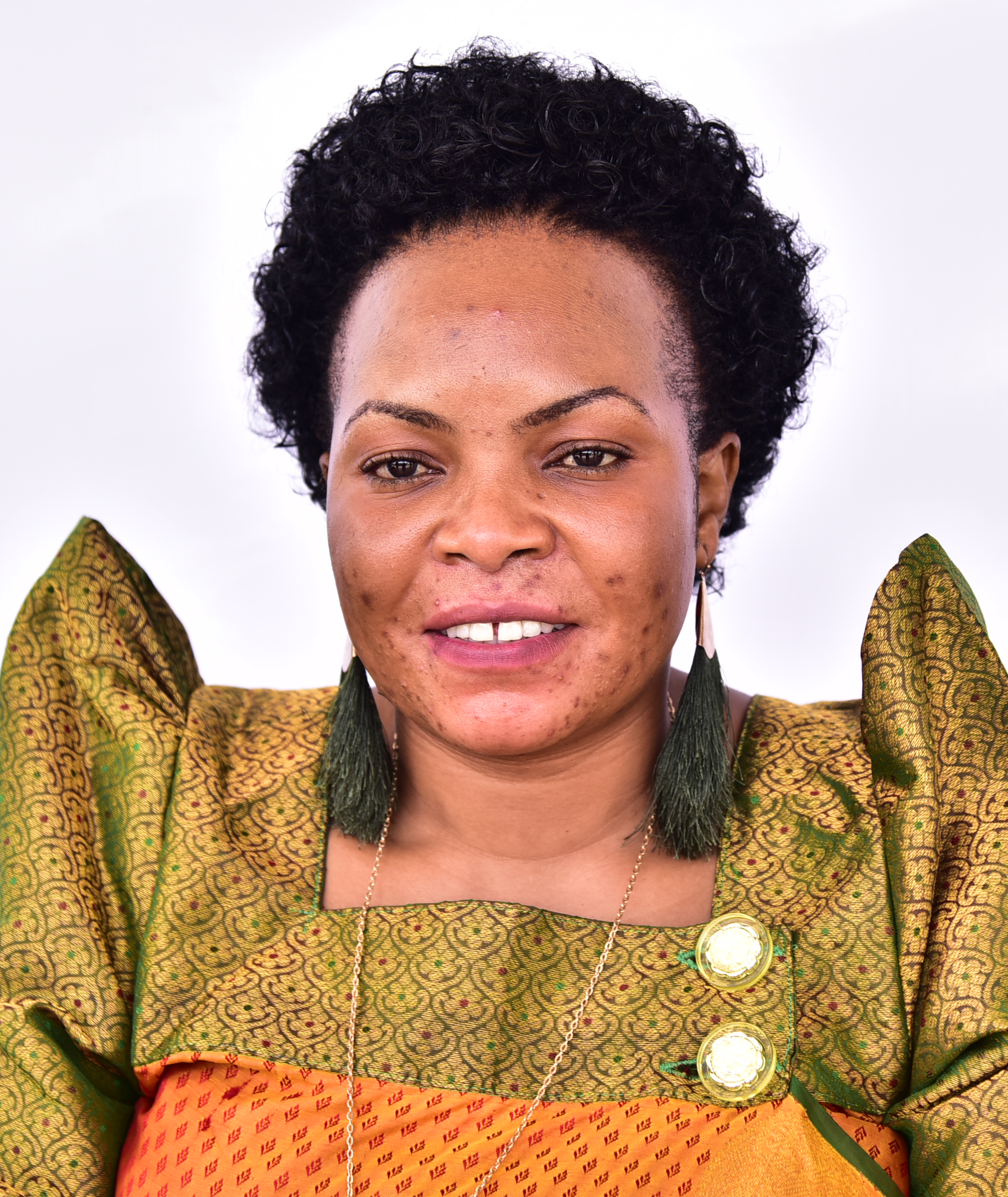
- Born: 5 October 1984 (age 41); Uganda
- Education: Kyambogo University (Bachelor of Social Work and Social Administration); Cavendish University Uganda (Master of Arts in International relations); Makerere Business Institute (Diploma in Accounting)
- Occupations: Social worker and Politician
- Years active: 2009–present
- Known for: Activism against political bullying and harassment
- Title: State Minister for Lands

Persis Princess Namuganza (born 5 October 1984) is a Ugandan politician and the State Minister for Lands, Housing and Urban Development (Lands) in the Cabinet of Uganda. She was appointed to that position on 6 June 2016. Namuganza concurrently served as the elected representative of Bukono County in Namutumba District, in the 11th Parliament (2021–2026). During the 2026 general elections, she was re- elected as the member of parliament for Bukono county in Namutumba district.

== Early life and education ==
Persis was born in Namutumba District on 5 October 1984 in an Anglican family. After attending local schools for her primary education, she studied at Mount Elgon High School in Mbale, for her Uganda Certificate of Education which she completed in 1999 . She then went to a school in Luweero District, where she sat for her Uganda Advanced Certificate of Education in 2003. In 2006, Namuganza was awarded a diploma in Accounting by the Makerere Business Institute (not affiliated with Makerere University). That same year, she entered Kyambogo University, graduating in 2009 with a Bachelor of Social Work and Social Administration degree. And in April 2014, she graduated from Cavendish University Uganda with a master's in international relations.

== Career ==
=== Before politics ===
Persis began her career in 2009 at Anti-Corruption Coalition Uganda, a non-governmental organization (NGO), where she served as a Programme officer from 2009 to 2010. She was transferred to Pearl of Africa Research and Accountability, another NGO, serving as a public relations officer and administrator from 2010 to 2012. She served as the chairperson Busoga Youth Forum from 2010 to 2011. She was appointed as a deputy Resident District Commissioner (RDC) for Luweero District, serving in that capacity from 2012 to 2015.

=== Political career ===
In 2016, Persis entered competitive elective national politics by contesting the Bukono County Constituency seat in Namutumba District on the National Resistance Movement political party platform. She won and is the incumbent.

Namuganza lost during the NRM primary elections in 2025. She then contested as an independent and came out of the race victorious.

In the 2026-2031 parliament, Namuganza declared her intentions to contest for the role of Speaker of parliament. She clearly stated that her intention for the role was to clean parliament that had been tainted with corruption. During this time, her party, the National Resistance Movement CEC had endorsed Anitah Among as the flag bearer for the race but she said that was not about to stop her. Namuganza later withdrew from the race and decided to support the NRM candidate, Jacob Oboth Oboth.

In the new Uganda cabinet of 2026/2031, Namuganza was appointed State Minister for Lands, Housing and Urban Development.

== Her other contributions ==
She bought a tractor; "Twabire Community Tractor 2018" for Bukono County. She bought coffee seedlings for the youth. She distributed scholastic materials to some schools, including Twivula Secondary School. She fundraised USh7 Million towards building the Arch-Deaconry House. She provided half and full bursaries to secondary school and university students. She built a ventilated improved pit (VIP) latrine for Kikalu Primary School. She purchased onion seeds for the people of Ivukula. On 17 January 2019, she donated to Kibaale Namutumba Farmers' SACCO, 2 million Uganda Shillings.

== Hobbies and special interests ==
Persis Princess Namuganza participates in political debates, touring, traveling, swimming, listening to gospel music, and watching movies and football. Her activities include environmental cleaning and community sensitization regarding security, health, and hygiene.

== Controversies ==
In March 2018, 32 members of the Busoga parliamentary caucus met and voted to expel Persis Namuganza, from the caucus, for "unbecoming conduct". The caucus accused Namuganza of threatening as well as inciting her voters to cause harm, injure and maim the Kyabazinga William Gabula Nadiope IV and Speaker Rebecca Kadaga at a rally she held at Ivukula in Namutumba District, during the first half of March 2018.

On Monday 12 March 2018, the Daily Monitor reported that the Inspector General of Government, Irene Mulyagonja was investigating Namugaza, for possible lack of the necessary academic qualifications to hold the public offices. The investigation was initiated, following a formal complainant, filed on 7 March 2018, by a group of "concerned people" from Busoga, her home sub-region.

Namuganza was censured by the Parliament of Uganda on 23 January 2023 as a result of alleged misconduct. 348 MPs voted for her to be censured, 5 MPs were against the censure motion.

== See also ==
- Busoga
- Cabinet of Uganda
- Member of Parliament
- List of members of the eleventh Parliament of Uganda
- Richard Gafabusa
- Parliament of Uganda
- Omwony Ojwok
