= Innocent Oula =

Ugandan military leader

Major General Innocent Oula
- Born: 1961 (age 64–65); Uganda
- Citizenship: Uganda
- Occupation: Military officer
- Years active: 1981–present

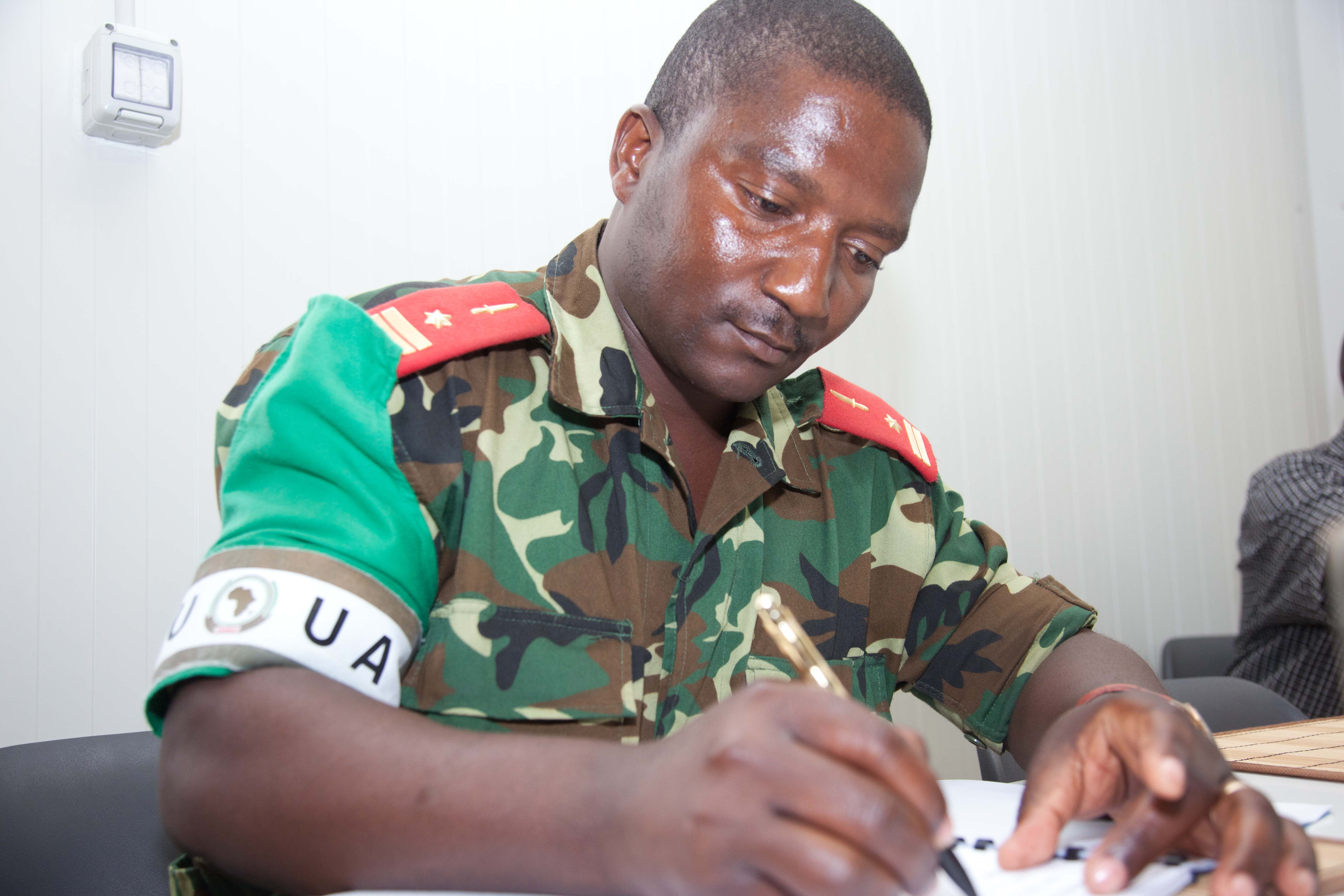
Innocent Oula

Major General Innocent Felix Oula is a senior army officer in the Uganda People's Defence Force (UPDF). As of March 2020, he serves as the Head of Civil Military Cooperation. He concurrently serves as one of the UPDF representatives to the Parliament of Uganda. He was elected to that position in January 2014, replacing renegade General David Sejusa, who was expelled from Parliament.

== Background and education ==
He was born in Lira, in 1961 to Amos Ogwang and the late Kevinah Ogwang, the second-born in a family of nine siblings. He attended school up to Senior 4 in schools in and around Lira. He later obtained a Diploma in Management.

From 1981 until 1982, he attended the cadet course at a military academy in the Republic of the Sudan, graduating as a second lieutenant. From 1984 until 1985, he attended a military course at an institution in China. From 2012 until 2013, he attended National Defence College, Kenya (NDCK), graduating with the Diploma In International Studies. At NDCK, Brigadier Oula was in the same class with Brigadier Samuel Kavuma.

== Military career ==
Innocent Oula joined the National Resistance Army in 1986 at the rank of captain. He rose through the ranks and has served as a member of UPDF delegation during the ill-fated Juba Peace Talks, at the rank of lieutenant colonel. At the level of colonel, in 2009, he served at the director of training for the UPDF 2nd Division, based at Mbarara, in Western Uganda. From 2010 until 2011, he served as the Chief of Staff of AMISOM, based in Mogadishu, Somalia. On his return from Somalia, he was posted to the 4th UPDF Division headquarters in Gulu, as the commanding officer. He later was appointed chief of personnel and administration in the UPDF, based at the Mbuya Barracks. In January 2014, he was elected to the Parliament of Uganda, as a UPDF representative. In November 2014, he was promoted to the rank of brigadier, along with more than 1,300 UPDF officers who received promotions at the same time. On 28 March 2020, he was promoted from the rank of Brigadier to that of Major General.

== Family ==
Brigadier Innocent Oula is a married father.

== See also ==
- Sam Kavuma
- David Muhoozi
- Leopold Kyanda
