= National Defence College, Kenya =

Coordinates: 01°18′10″S 36°42′00″E

The National Defence College, Kenya (NDCK) is a training facility under NDU-K for senior commanders in the Kenya Defence Forces, including the Kenya Army, Kenya Navy, and Kenya Air Force as well as the Kenya Special Forces. Training is also availed to senior Kenyan civil servants and senior military officers from African countries and other continents.

== Location ==
The college is located in Karen, a suburb of Kenya's capital of Nairobi, approximately 19 kilometres (12 mi), by road, west of Nairobi's central business district.

== History ==
The college was established in 1992, to train senior Kenyan military officers in National Security Studies. Due to limited available training openings and the high cost of training in foreign military academies, the Government of Kenya established the NDCK. For the next five years, a panel of high-ranking military officers set up the college and structured the courses offered. In 1997, the college admitted its first class, and has graduated a class every year starting in 1998. The annual intake as at November 2014, is 40 participants. Beginning in 2002, the college, in collaboration with the University of Nairobi, awards the Diploma, Bachelor of Arts and Master of Arts degrees in International Studies.

== Courses ==
The most popular course is the one year National Security Course, that lasts 45 weeks of study, with two breaks, each of 2 to 3 weeks duration. Other courses leading to the award of Diploma, BA and MA degrees in conjunction with Nairobi University, are also offered.

== Alumni ==
The notable alumni of National Defence College, Kenya include the following:

- Brigadier Samuel Kavuma - Commander of the UPDF Contingent in Somalia, as part of the African Union Mission to Somalia (AMISOM). He was in the class of July 2012 to June 2013.
- Major General Levi Karuhanga - Chairman of the UPDF General Court Martial. He was in the class of July 2006 to June 2007.
- General Haji Abubaker Jeje Odongo - Current State Minister for Defence in Uganda. He was in the class of July 2007 to June 2008.
- Brigadier Innocent Oula - Current Chief of Personnel and Administration in the Uganda People's Defence Force (UPDF). He was in the class of July 2012 to June 2013.

== See also ==
- Kenya Defence Forces
