= Idah Nantaba =

Ugandan politician (born 1979)

Ida Erios Nantaba
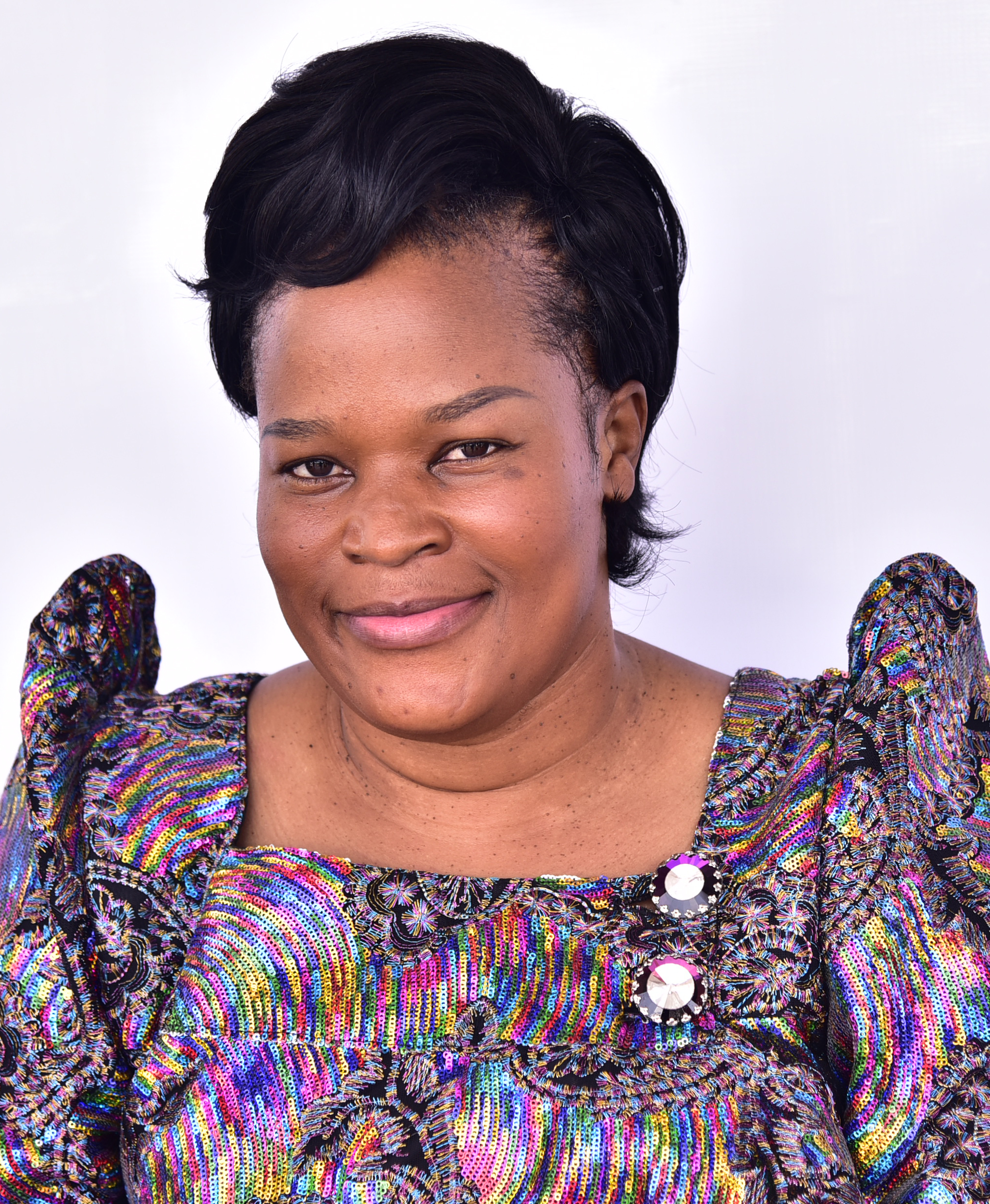
- Born: 20 December 1979 (age 46); Kayunga, Uganda
- Citizenship: Ugandan
- Education: Ndeeba Primary School; Ndeeba Senior Secondary school Katikamu SDA Senior Secondary school Mukono Town Academy
- Alma mater: Makerere University (Bachelor of Arts in Tourism)
- Occupations: Tourism officer, businesswoman, politician
- Years active: 2003–Dec 2019
- Known for: Politics
- Political party: National Resistance Movement
- Spouse: Single

Ida Erios Nantaba (20 December 1979) is a Ugandan politician. She was the State Minister in the Uganda Ministry of Information and Communications Technology. She was appointed to that position on 6 June 2016. Prior to that, from 15 August 2012 until 6 June 2016, she was Minister of State for Lands in the Cabinet of Uganda. Nantaba is also the elected Member of Parliament for Women in Kayunga District Constituency.

== Early life and education ==
Nantaba was born in Kayunga District on 20 December 1979. Her father died in 1984 and she was left with her mother who took care of her with support from her elder brother (Samuel Kabenge Bamulumbye) the heir of her father. She attended Ndeeba Primary School in Kayunga District from 1986 to 1992, where she finished her Primary Leaving Examinations. However, her mother and elder brother did not have enough money to take her to a very good secondary school so she joined Ndeeba Senior Secondary School for her S1 in 1993. She then moved to stay with her elder brother in Kisoga village, still in Kayunga District. Villagers of Kisoga recall how she used to be carried on a bicycle by her brother to school, about 14 kilometres (8.7 mi) from their home, daily. In 1994, Nantaba's mother acquired some money, and Nantaba was moved from Ndeeba SSS to Katikamu SDA SSS where she studied from Senior 2 to Senior 4 (Uganda Certificate of Education). She was admitted at Mukono Town Academy for her A' Level which she completed in November 1998. On 26 September 1999, Nantaba was admitted to Makerere University, for a bachelor's degree in tourism. She undertook an undergraduate student research project, "Medicinal Plants As Tourism Potential: Case Study of Uganda Wildlife Educational Center (UWEC)", which was supervised by Professor J. B. Nyakaana. Nantaba has a Bachelor's degree in Tourism, obtained in 2003 from Makerere University.

== Career ==
=== 2003–2015 ===
In 2003, following her graduation from Makerere, she worked as a tourism officer with Pearl of Africa Tours and Travel Limited. She left that job in late 2003. Beginning in 2005, she served on the board of directors of Jordan Laboratories Limited, a distributor of photographic and printing equipment. In 2010, she joined active elective politics by contesting the Kayunga District Women's Parliamentary Constituency. She won the NRM political party primary by defeating the incumbent, Florence Naiga. In 2011, she was elected during the general election. In a cabinet reshuffle on 15 August 2012, she was appointed as State Minister for Lands, replacing Sarah Opendi Achieng. After weeks of protracted confirmation hearings, the Appointments Committee of Parliament finally confirmed her appointment on 23 October 2012.

=== 2015–present ===
During the 2016 parliamentary election cycle, Nantaba withdrew from the party primary elections held by the National Resistance Movement (NRM), her political party at the time. She quit the party, citing rigging during the primaries, as she had previously warned. During the national elections held on 18 February 2016, Nantaba, who ran as an independent candidate, polled 86,057 votes against Ruth Nakacwa, who received 13,184 votes. Despite having quit the ruling NRM party, she was appointed as Minister of State for ICT on 6 June 2016.

On 24 March 2019, Nantaba was involved in an assassination incident that led to the suspect being handcuffed and shot dead by Ugandan police. Nantaba had gotten suspicious of the man, Ronald Ssebulime, had been following them on his motorcycle in Kayunga District. After a pursuit, Ssebulime was arrested, handcuffed, and shot twice in the chest by an officer. Officials initially tried to cover up the incident, saying they had thwarted an assassination attempt. But after civic outrage, the police released a statement holding the officer responsible.

== Other responsibilities ==
Aidah Nantaba is single. She is of the Seventh-day Adventist faith. She sits in the 10th Parliament (2016–2021) as an Independent. She serves on the following additional committees in parliament:

- Committee on Tourism, Trade and Industry
- Committee on HIV/AIDS and Related Matters

== See also ==
- Kayunga District
- Parliament of Uganda
- List of members of the tenth Parliament of Uganda
