= Ministry of Disaster Preparedness and Refugees (Uganda) =

Government ministry of Uganda

Coordinates: 00°18′58″N 32°35′11″E

- Coat of Arms of Uganda

Ministry overview
- Type: Ministry
- Jurisdiction: Government of Uganda
- Headquarters: Twin Towers; Sir Apollo Kaggwa Drive; Kampala, Uganda
- Ministry executives: Hillary Onek, Minister of disaster preparedness and refugees; Musa Ecweru, State minister of disaster preparedness and refugees
- Website: Homepage

The Ministry of Disaster Preparedness and Refugees is a cabinet-level government ministry of Uganda. The ministry is responsible for the coordination of all refugee matters in the country. It is also responsible for national preparedness for disasters, including floods, landslides, earthquakes, droughts, and famine.

Hillary Onek is the minister of disaster preparedness and refugees.

== Location ==
The headquarters of the ministry are located in the Twin Towers, Sir Apollo Kaggwa Road, in the Central Division of Kampala, Uganda's capital and largest city. The coordinates of the ministry headquarters are: 0°18'58.0"N, 32°35'11.0"E (Latitude:0.316111; Longitude:32.586389).

== Overview ==
The ministry is part of the office of the prime minister of Uganda (OPM).

== Administrative structure ==
The cabinet minister is assisted by Minister of State for Relief and Disaster Preparedness Musa Ecweru. Christine Guwatudde Kintu is the ministry's chief accounting officer.

== List of ministers ==
=== Minister of Disaster Preparedness and Refugees ===
- Hilary Onek (23 May 2013 - present)
- Vacant (11 April 2013 - 23 May 2013)
- Stephen Mallinga (27 May 2011 - 11 April 2013)
- Tarsis Kabwegyere (1 June 2006 - 27 May 2011)
- Moses Ali (24 July 2001 - 1 June 2006)

== See also ==
- Parliament of Uganda
