= Ntare School =

Coordinates: 0°36′10″S 30°39′11″E

- Mbarara, Mbarara District; Uganda

Information
- Type: Public Middle School and High School
- Motto: Better your best
- Established: 1956
- Headteacher: Rwampororo Saul
- Enrollment: 2700(2025)
- Slogan: The Lion Roars
- Athletics: Rugby, soccer, track, tennis, hockey, cricket, volleyball, basketball, table tennis,badminton,handball,beach soccer,chess
- Website: Homepage

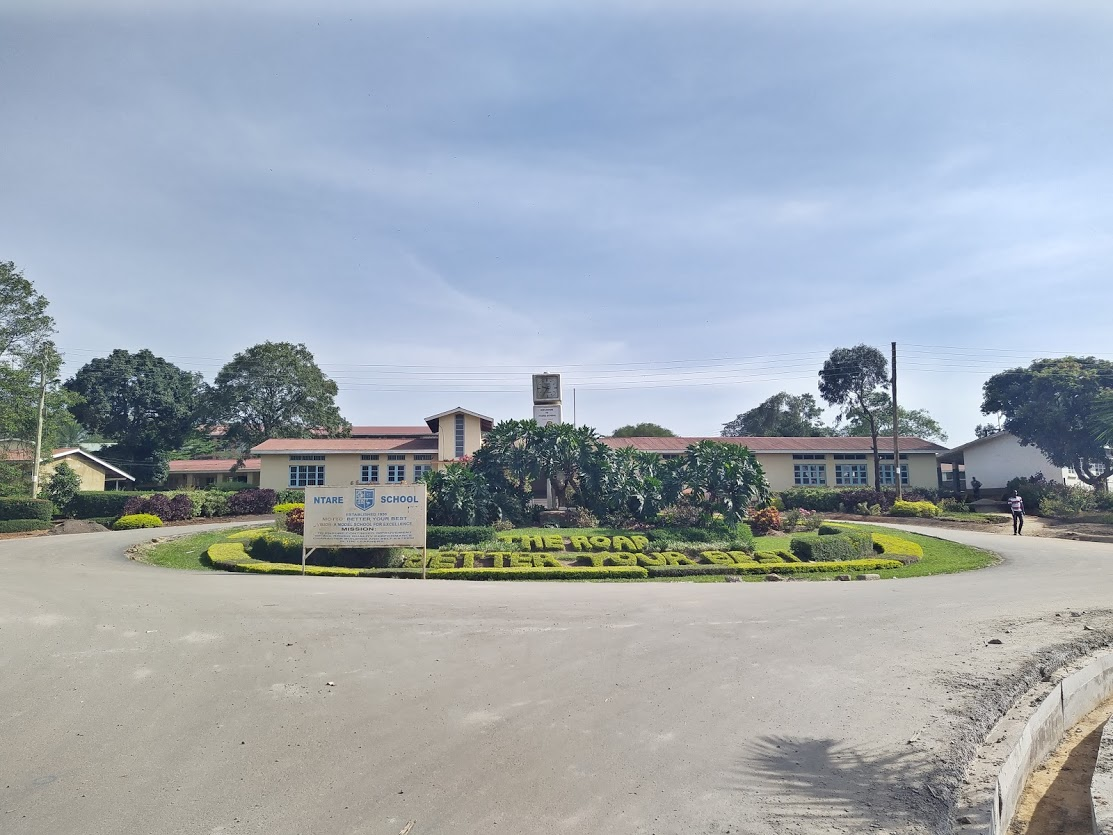
Ntare School in Mbarara, Uganda

Ntare School is a residential all-boys' secondary school located in Mbarara, Mbarara District, south western Uganda. It was founded in 1956 by a Scottish educator named William Crichton.

== Location ==
The school is approximately 1 kilometre (0.62 mi), by road, north of the central business district of Mbarara, the largest city (2014 population: 195,013), in the Western Region. The school campus is approximately 267 kilometres (166 mi), by road, west of Kampala, Uganda's capital and largest city. The coordinates of the school are 0°36'10.0"S, 30°39'11.0"E (Latitude:-0.602778; Longitude:30.653056). The school is situated on the convex slope of Ntare hill at an elevation of 1,400 metres (4,600 ft), above sea level.

== Reputation ==
Ntare School is one of the most prestigious schools in Uganda due to its history, reputation, excellent academic performance, and dominance in sports.

Ntare School also boasts of an Alumni Soccer League the Ntare Lions League which runs every sunday.

== Houses of residence ==
- Africa
- Aggrey
- Bangizi Jed
- Crichton
- Golden
- Kamugungunu
- Mbaguta
- New House
- Nile House
- Pearl
- Pioneer

== Former Headmasters ==
Mr. William Crichton - Founding Headmaster 1956 to 1971

Mr. Brian Remmer - 1971 to 1977

Mr. Jed Bangizi - 1977 to 1982

Mr. Gumisiriza G.L. - 1983 to 1985

Mr. H.H Mehangye - 1985 to 1987

Mr. Francis Kairagi - 1987 to 1990

Mr. Eric Kansiime - 1990 - 1991

Mr. Stephen Kamuhanda - 1991 to 2002

Mr. Humphrey Ahimbisibwe - 2003 to 2012

Mr. Turyagyenda Jimmy - 2013 up-2023

Mr. Rwampororo Saul- 2023- up to date

== Notable alumni ==
=== Politicians ===
- Yoweri Museveni
- Paul Kagame
- Amama Mbabazi
- John Nasasira
- Eriya Kategaya
- Nobel Mayombo
- Ephraim Kamuntu
- Elioda Tumwesigye
- Tarsis Kabwegyere
- Daniel Kidega
- Fred Ruhindi
- Omwony Ojwok
- Serapio Rukundo
- James Nsaba Buturo
- Richard Nduhura
- Stephen Mallinga
- Patrick Mazimhaka

=== Academics ===
- Elly Katunguka

=== Judges ===
- Amos Twinomujuni
- Jotham Tumwesigye

=== Lawyers ===
- Francis K. Butagira

=== Writers ===
- Tumusiime Rushedge
- Arthur Gakwandi
- John Ruganda

=== Others ===
- Allan Toniks
- Bemanya Twebaze, Lawyer; former Registrar General Uganda Registration Services Bureau
