= Joyce Bagala =

Ugandan journalist and politician

Joyce Bagala Ntwatwa
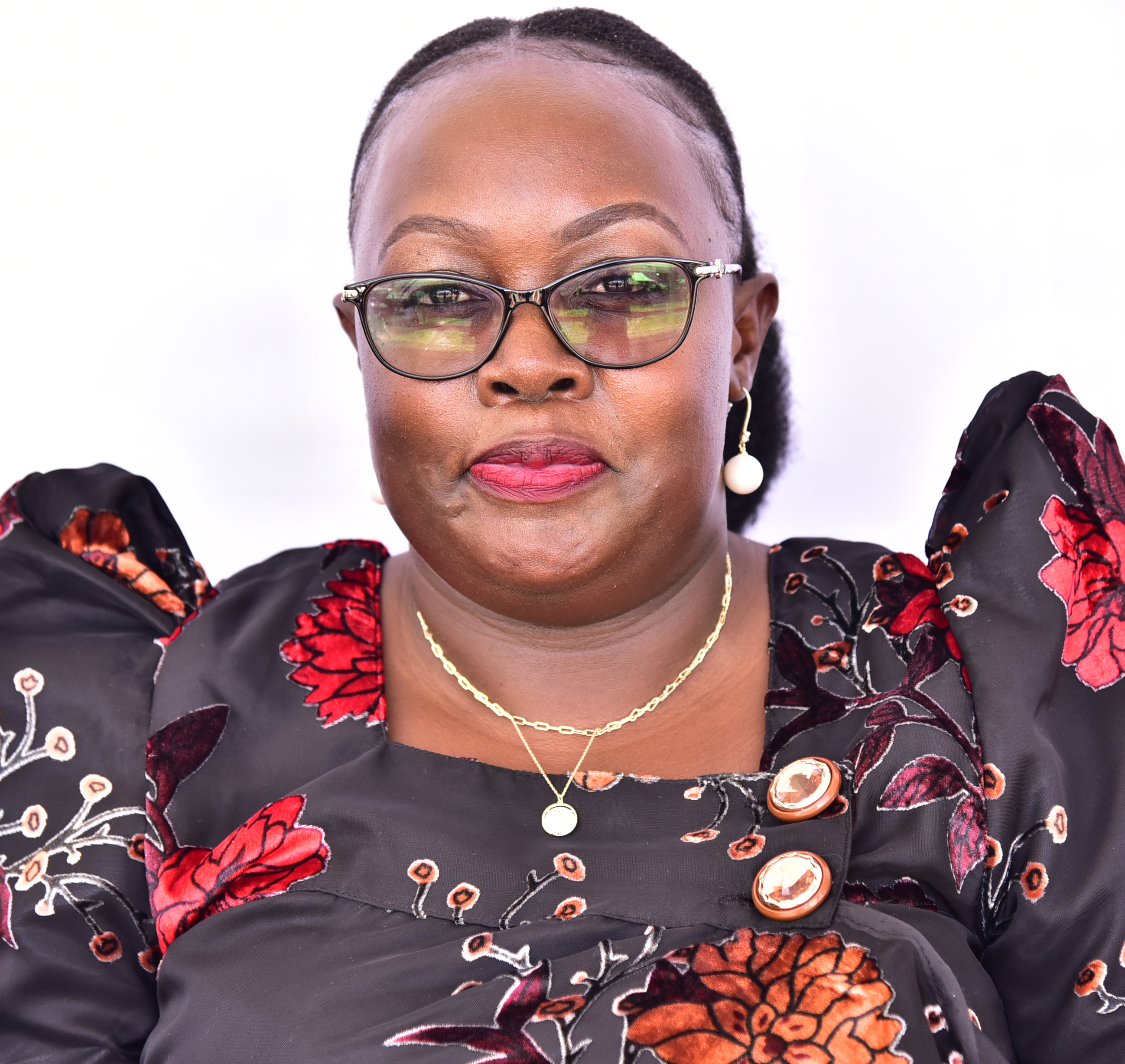
- Bagala in 2021

Woman Member of Parliament for Mityana District
- In office May 2021 – May 2026
- Preceded by: Judith Nabakooba
- Succeeded by: Judith Nabakooba

Personal details
- Born: Joyce Bagala Ntwatwa Mityana, Uganda
- Citizenship: Ugandan
- Party: National Unity Platform (2020–2025); Independent (2025–present)
- Spouse: Married
- Children: 2
- Education: Makerere University; UMCAT School of Journalism and Mass Communication
- Occupation: Journalist, politician
- Profession: News Anchor, Media Manager

Joyce Bagala Ntwatwa, also known as Joyce Bagala is a Ugandan journalist and politician. Formerly served as the news manager at Next Media's NBS television.

Bagala was elected as Woman Member of Parliament for Mityana District during the 2021 general election on the National Unity Platform ticket, a position she lost to NRM's Judith Nabakooba in the 2026 general election, as she emerged in 3rd place with 10,179 votes

== Early life and education ==
Bagala is a Muganda by tribe. She comes from the family of the late Petero Ntwatwa, who served as the Buganda Lukiiko speaker in the 1960s, and maternal grandfather Rev William Ssewanyana Katula, the former Mityana diocesan secretary. She lost both her parents at a young age and was raised by her maternal aunt, Josephine Esther Nansikombi.

She went to Mityana Junior School, Gombe SS and UMCAT School of Journalism and Mass Communication. She later went to Makerere University to pursue a degree in mass communication.

== Career ==
=== Journalism career ===
Bagala joined NBS TV in 2016 and has been the flagship anchor of Amasengejje, the 7 pm Luganda news broadcast. She also worked at Radio One Uganda. Bagala worked as a news reader in English at Beat FM, Buddu FM and Sanyu FM. She started anchoring Luganda news at Sanyu FM. In 2019, Bagala was one of the news managers suspended from work on the directive of the Uganda Communications Commission for giving coverage to Presidential Hopefiul, and Kyadondo East MP Robert Kyagulanyi aka Bobi Wine protests. Uganda Communications Commission suspended all officers at various media houses who were in charge of broadcasts. She threatened to sue the station for wrongful dismissal, a threat that never yielded.

In 2019, she was reported to have ended her 11-year career at Radio One Uganda to create time to make a come back in the upcoming 2021 elections with the current Mityana District woman member of Parliament, Judith Nabakooba. Bagala, however, has retained her job at NBS television.

=== Political career ===
In 2019, she hinted about retiring from media to join politics. However, she contested the 2016 general elections and lost to Judith Nabakooba, who was the NRM candidate for Mityana Woman MP. Three years prior, she also contested the elections raced with her cousin Namuleme Esther Ntwatwa, and they both lost to Nabakooba. On 22 October-2020, the high court in Mubende nullified Joyce Bagala's election as Mityana woman member of parliament and called for fresh elections, following a petition by lands Minister Judith Nabakooba. Bagala was sued by Minister of Lands, Housing and Urban Planning Judith Nabakooba who claimed voter bribery and vote rigging. She lost her MP seat in 2026 election.

== Personal life ==
Bagala is married with two children.

== See also ==
- NBS television
