= Hilary Onek =

Ugandan politician (born 1948)

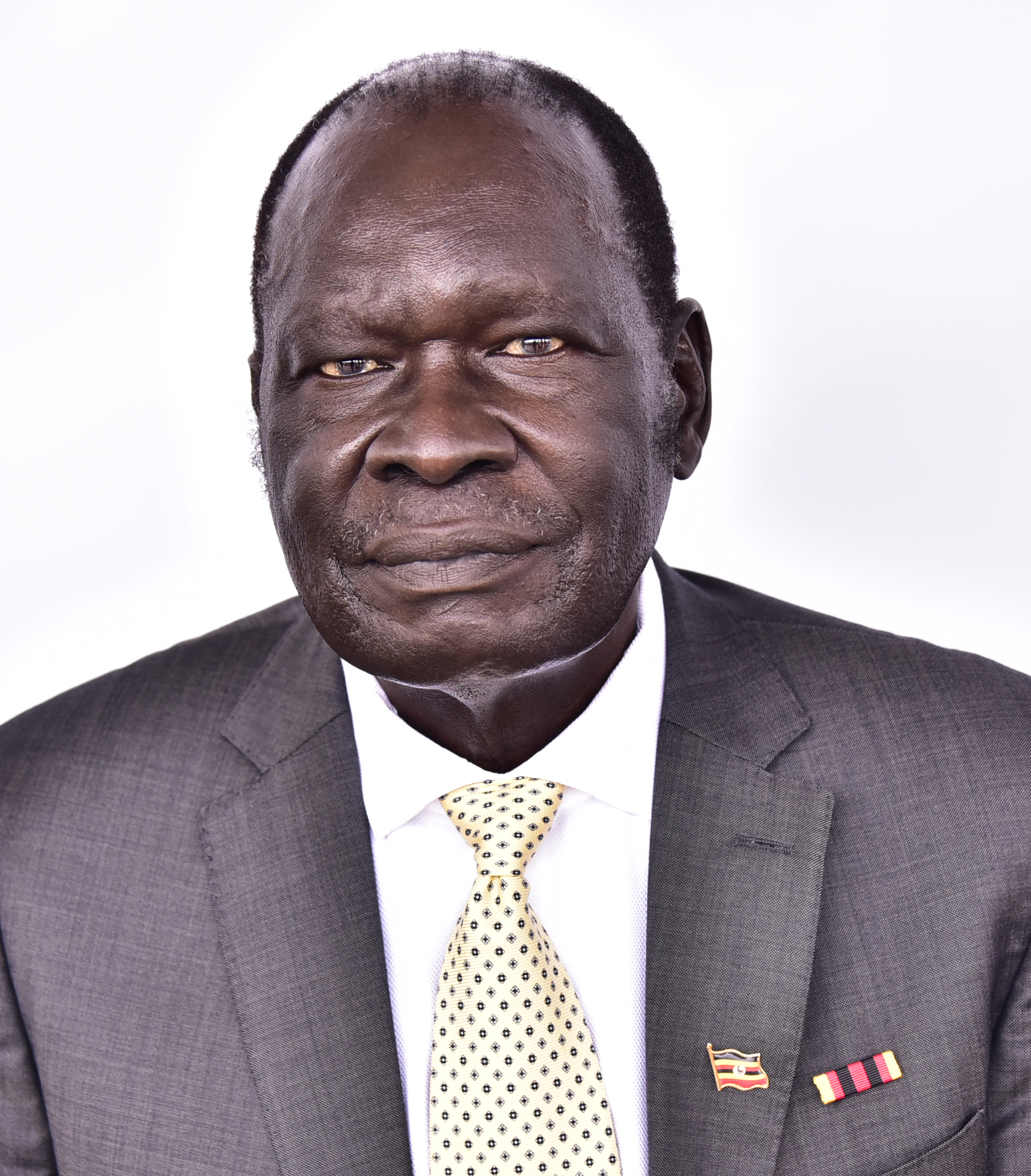
- Onek in 2007
- Born: 5 May 1948 (age 78); Uganda
- Education: Moscow University (BSc in Civil Engineering, MSc in Hydrologic Engineering); Makerere University (MBA)
- Occupations: Engineer; politician
- Years active: 1980–present

Hilary Obaloker Onek (born 5 May 1948) is a Ugandan engineer and politician. He is the current Minister for Relief, Disaster Preparedness and Refugees in the Ugandan Cabinet. He was appointed to that position on 27 May 2013. He replaced Tarsis Kabwegyere. Prior to that, Hilary Onek served as the Minister for Energy & Minerals, from 16 February 2009 until 27 May 2011. Before that, he served as Uganda's Minister of Agriculture, Animal Industry & Fisheries from 2006 to 2009. He is also the elected Member of Parliament (MP) representing Lamwo County, Lamwo District. He was first elected to Parliament in 2001.

== Early life ==
Onek Hilary was born on 5 May 1948, the second born to Samson Okello Otto, son of Rwot Damwoy of Pakala Clan in Palabek Gem and Mrs. Jera Ayoo, daughter of Rwot Onyanga, the Paramount Chief of Palabek, one of the six chieftaincies of Lamwo County. The Pakala Clan are largely found in Gem, Lokung and a few in parts of South Sudan, along the border with Palabek and Lokung. In the olden days, the Rwodi or Royal Acholi families arranged marriages of their children.

Mze Samson Okello Otto was serving in the King's African Rifles (KAR) in Kenya during 1946 when he married Mama Ayoo. He left the Army in 1954 and joined the Public Works Department (PWD) at Entebbe and later worked in different parts of Uganda, including Mubende, Hoima, Soroti and Moroto. Mze Otto moved with his family wherever duty took him.

== Education ==
Hilary Onek attended his primary school in Moroto, Karamoja. He attended St. Mary's College Kisubi for both his "O" & "A" Level education, from 1965 until 1970. From 1971 until 1974, Onek attended Makerere University, Uganda's oldest university, but he dropped out before graduation. He proceeded to the People's Friendship University in Moscow, Russia, where he studied from 1974 until 1979, graduating with the Bachelor of Science (BSc) in Civil Engineering and the Master of Science (MSc) in Engineering, majoring in Water Resources & Hydro-technical Structural Engineering. Following his MSc studies, he completed a one-year fellowship at the Moscow Institute of Civil Engineering in Hydropower Dams & Hydro-technical Structures, from 1979 until 1980.

Hilary Onek also holds a Postgraduate Certificate in Investment Appraisal and Management, from Harvard University, in Cambridge, Massachusetts, United States, obtained in 1994. In 1997, he obtained another postgraduate certificate in Public-Private Partnership in Utility Management, from the Institute For Public-Private Partnerships, in Washington, DC. Between 1998 and 2000, he attended Makerere University, graduating with the degree of Master of Business Administration, (MBA).

== Professional qualifications ==
His professional qualifications include the following:

- Bachelor of Science (BSc) in Civil Engineering – Moscow University – 1977
- Master of Science (MSc) in Civil Engineering, majoring in Water Resources Engineering & Hydro-Technical Structures – Moscow University – 1979.
- Master of Business Administration (MBA) – Makerere University – 2000
- Registered Chartered Engineer in Uganda – Has authority to sign technical documents, and give a legally binding technical opinion on Civil Engineering matters.

== Work experience ==
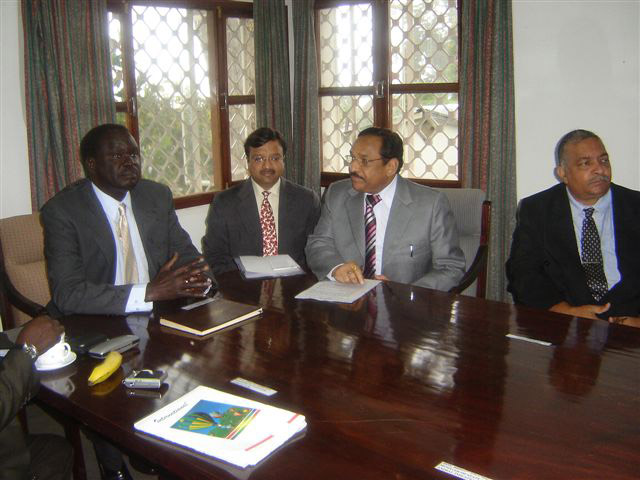
Hillary Onek Minister for Relief, Disaster Preparedness and Refugees

Hilary started his engineering career while in graduate school. He worked as an Assistant (pupil) Site Engineer, Nurek 305m Hydropower Dam Construction, Tajikistan (USSR), from May until August 1977. Between May and August 1978, he worked as an Assistant (pupil) Site Engineer, 280m Inguri Hydropower Concrete Arc-Dam Construction, in the Republic of Georgia in the Soviet Union.

During the time he spent at the Moscow Institute of Civil Engineering Hydro-technical Engineering Laboratory, he was involved in the design and research regarding several International projects:

- Participated in the design of Kabur 80m Hydropower Dam in Syria
- Was a member of the design team for Cascades of 4 dams on Andes Ranges in Peru, South America
- Conducted experiments to determine physical characteristics and structural stability of soils of different textures used in dams under different load conditions – setting standards and engineering guides
- Presented over 10 papers at workshops on dam structures and their stability.

In 1980 Hilary returned to Uganda and became a lecturer at Makerere University in the Department of Technology, teaching Water Resources Engineering and Hydro-technical Structural Engineering. He supervised students' course works, carried out research on the River Nile and other Ugandan rivers. His findings were presented at Energy Workshops sponsored by the National Research Council and other industry groups. He remained at Makerere, in that Capacity until 1983.

In 1982, he was appointed chief engineer at National Water and Sewerage Corporation, a parastatal water and sewerage utility. His work at NWSC involved the design of reservoirs, booster stations, water transmission mains, upgrading and expanding water treatment and pumping systems for Kampala and other towns in Uganda. In appreciation of his efforts, the authorities promoted him to managing director of NWSC in 1983.

During his tenure at the helm of NWSC, water and sewerage services, which were limited to Kampala, Jinja and Entebbe, were expanded to cover other towns including Mbale, Tororo, Masaka, Mbarara, Kasese, Fort Portal, Gulu, and Lira. He developed a corporate plan to cover medium and long term development programs, with a view to make NWSC a leading water utility company in the region. From 1984 until 1998, he instituted a manpower development program and a training program, to sustainably improve the quality of management in the organisation. He oversaw the computerization of internal management information system (MIS) and digitized geographical information system (GIS), easing management of customer's data and human resources. He introduced Public-Private Partnership in NWSC by privatizing revenue collection and Management (1997–8). During his tenure, revenue collection at the water utility doubled. This management model has now been adopted as "standard practice" at the Ministry of Water Resources. In 1987, Hilary was personally involved in the redesign and rebuilding of Manafwa Water Works, the works exploded under water hummer and collapsed after commissioning, following shoddy construction by an outside contractor. He served as Managing Director of NWSC until 1998.

Between 1998 and 2001, he worked as an independent, private consultant at a company called EOM Services Limited, offering services with other consultancy groups, in the areas of Human Resources Management, Investment Appraisals and Management, Water Supply and Structural Engineering.

== Political career ==
Hilary Onek joined active politics in 2000, with affiliation to the National Resistance Movement (NRM). He actively campaigned in the Acholi sub-region, for Yoweri Kaguta Museveni, between January and March 2001. He contested for the parliamentary seat of Lamwo Constituency and was declared the winner in June 2001. He was re-elected to the same seat in February 2006, again on the NRM platform. He was appointed Minister for Agriculture, Animal Industry and Fisheries in June 2006, serving in that capacity until February 2009. As Agriculture and Fisheries Minister, he advocated for responsible utilization of the water resources in East Africa. On 16 February 2009 Hilary Onek was appointed Minister of Energy and Mineral Resources, a position he worked in until May 2011. In the cabinet reshuffle on 27 May 2011, he was reassigned to the Internal Affairs Ministry as a full Minister.

Onek was one of those accused in 2011 of receiving bribes from foreign oil firms as kickbacks. Irish oil firm Tullow Oil reportedly paid bribes to Onek before another MP implicated him and others in the saga. Despite calls for resignation, a lawyer, Severino Twinobusingye, managed to successfully sue the Attorney General and halt the proceedings and to block the calls for resignation.

Following further suspicion around the incident as a result of Tullow Oil's court case with Heritage Oil over its tax on Uganda assets, an ad-hoc parliamentary committee was convened to further investigate the allegations of corruption.

== Business enterprises ==
Hillary Onek is also a businessman. He is the proprietor of Kitgum Bomah Hotel in Kitgum and of Gulu Bomah Hotel in Gulu. The Kitgum hotel is the 4th hotel in Northern Uganda to have a swimming pool, after (a) Paraa Lodge (b) Chobe Lodge, both in Murchison Falls National Park and Acholi Inn in Gulu. The Gulu property is the first hotel in the region to contain an elevator.

== Membership to parliamentary committees ==
Since 2001, Onek has served on several parliamentary committees including:

1. Committee on Natural Resources – Committee Chair (2001–2002)
2. Committee on Legal & Parliamentary Affairs – Member (2001–2003)
3. Committee on Science and Technology – Member (2003–06)
4. Committee on the Humanitarian Situation in Northern Uganda – Member (2004–2005)

== Socio-political leadership ==
He has held various leadership positions including the following:

At Saint Mary's College Kisubi – (1965–1970)

- Actively participated in academic, social activities and sports. He served as assistant house prefect in Mugwanya House from 1967 until 1968. He was elected chairman of the School Council in 1967, serving until 1968. He was re-elected in 1969, serving until 1970. He was a member of the National Union of Students of Uganda (NUSU), from 1969 until 1972. Between 1969 and 1970, he served as the president of the Mathematics & Physics Club. During that same period, he was the chairman of the St Mary's High School Social Club. From 1969 until 1970, he was the captain of the school basketball team. He was also an active member of the high school athletics team, competing in high jump, triple jump, long jump and javelin, from 1967 until 1970.

At Makerere University – (1971–1974)

- Served as secretary to NUSU president, Omwony Ojwok (RIP), from 1971 until 1972. Served as the captain of Mitchell Hall Basketball Team from 1971 until 1973. He belonged to the Students' Progressive Political Camp and campaigned for student leaders who subscribed to then progressive ideology.

At Moscow University – (1974–1979)

- Elected President of the Uganda Students Union, serving in that capacity from 1977 until 1979. In February 1979, he organized and led students' revolt and demonstration to the Libyan Embassy in Moscow, protesting Libya's military support to Idi Amin.

== Professional organisations ==
1. Member, Board of Directors Management Training and Advisory Center, Uganda – 1982 to 1985
2. Member, Board of Directors Reconstruction and Development Corporation, Uganda – 1987 to 1989
3. Member, Board of Directors Civil Aviation Authority of Uganda – 1991 to 1997
4. Executive Board Member, Technical Committee of International Water Supply Association (IWSA) – 1989 to 2000
5. Corporate Member, Uganda Institute of Professional Engineers (UIPE) – 1989 to Present
6. Registered (Chartered) Engineer in Uganda – 1989 to Present

== Scientific publications ==
A partial list of publications and papers presented at seminars, workshops and conferences include the following:

1. "Elastic Beam on Flexible Foundation", Trud UDN – Moscow – March 1977
2. "On the Mechanical Strength of Soil in Dam Structure", Trud MICI – Moscow – May 1980
3. "Analysis of Stressed-strained Conditions and Structural Failure of Railway Embankments". Work done for Uganda Railways Corporation. – December 1980
4. "Exploitation of Lake Levels for Hydropower in Uganda" Paper presented at Energy Workshop and published by the Uganda National Research Council. – July 1981
5. "Dimension Analysis in Engineering – A research and modeling tool". Paper presented to staff and postgraduate students at the Faculty of Technology, Makerere University. – March 1982.
6. Co-Authored: "Water Pricing Experiences, An International Perspective". Editors: Ariel Dinar & Ashok Subramanian. World Bank Technical Paper Number 386. – 1997
7. "Water Utility Research: National Water and Sewerage Corporation Uganda". 23rd WEDC Conference – Durban, South Africa. – September 1997.
8. "Public-Private Partnership: National Water and Sewerage Corporation, Uganda". 24th WEDC Conference – Islamabad, Pakistan. – September 1998.
9. "Poor Design of Kiira Extension at Jinja Dam and Resultant Excessive Discharge of Water for Power Generation, The Main Cause of Dropping Lake Victoria Levels" Paper presented, as the main theme at Abraham Waligo Memorial Lecture organized by Uganda Institute of Professional Engineers. Faculty of Technology, Makerere University, Kampala. September 2004.
10. "Challenges and Opportunities to Agricultural Transformation: Option for Increasing and Sustaining Agricultural Growth and Development in Sub-Saharan Africa". Keynote Address, World Agricultural Forum, St. Louis, Missouri, United States. – 7 to 10 May 2007. Partly due to the impact of this keynote address, the next World Agricultural Forum was for the first time held in a location other than St. Louis, Missouri. The 10th World Agricultural Forum (WAF), was held in Kampala, Uganda in 2008.

== See also ==
- Cabinet of Uganda
- Parliament of Uganda
- Lamwo District
