= Judith Nabakooba =

Ugandan politician

Honourable Judith Nabakooba
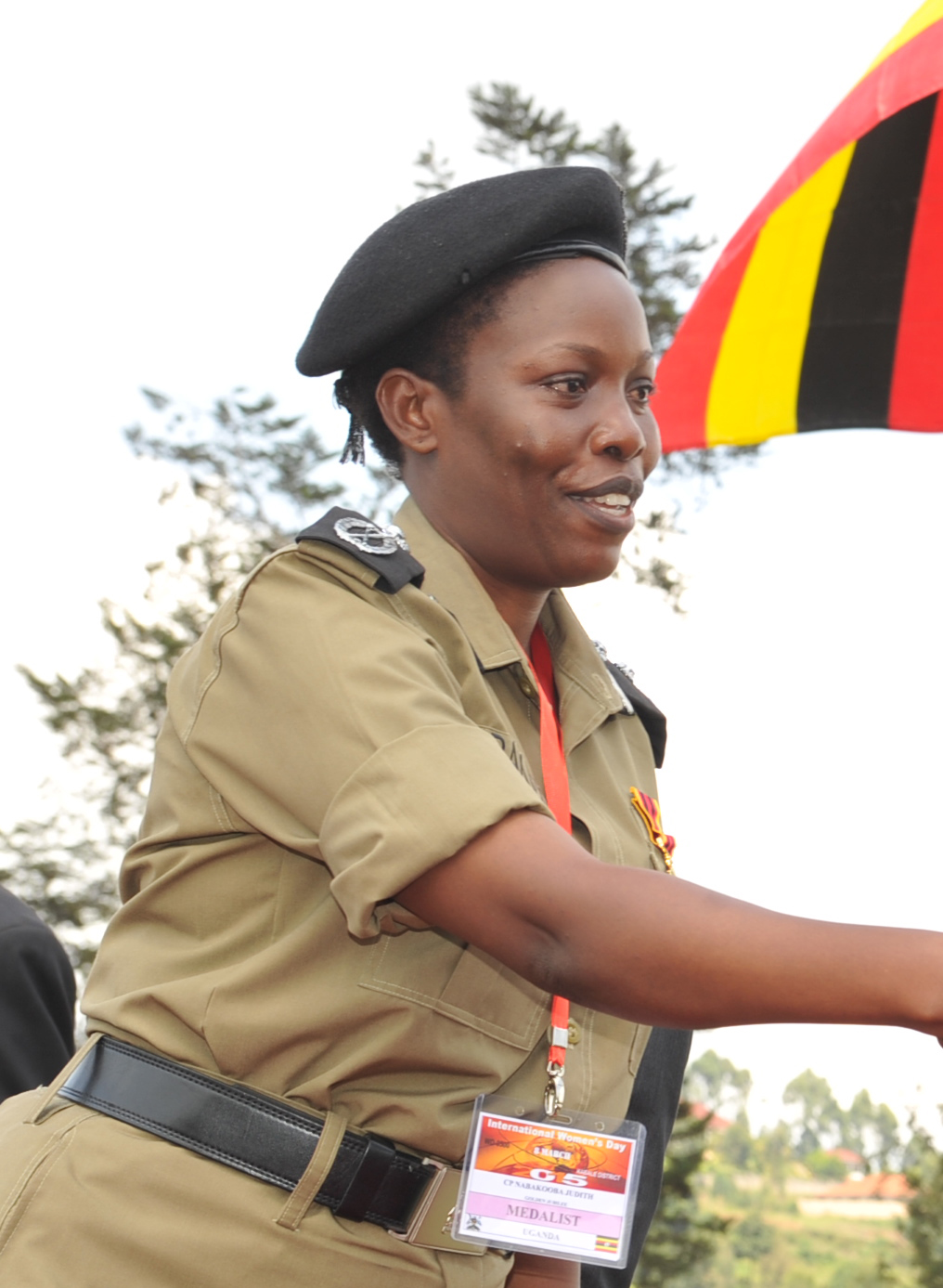
- Born: Mityana District, Uganda
- Citizenship: Uganda
- Education: Ndejje Secondary School (Uganda Certificate of Education) (Uganda Advanced Certificate of Education); Makerere University (Bachelor of Mass Communication) (Master of Human Rights); Chartered Management Institute (Diploma in Strategic Leadership Management); Uganda Management Institute (Diploma in Management) (Diploma in Monitoring and Evaluation)
- Occupation: Politician
- Years active: 2003–present
- Known for: Politics
- Title: Minister of Lands, Housing and Urban Development

Judith Nalule Nabakooba is a Ugandan politician and former policewoman. She is currently the Minister of Lands, Housing and Urban Development, in the Cabinet of Uganda. She was appointed to that position on 8 June 2021.

Before that, from December 2019, until May 2021, she served as the Cabinet Minister of Information and Communications Technology.

Nabakooba served as the elected Member of Parliament, representing Mityana District Women's Constituency in the 10th Parliament (2016–2021).

== Early life and education ==
Nabakooba attended Ndejje Secondary School, in Luweero District, for her middle school and high school education, where she obtained both the Uganda Certificate of Education in 1994, and the Uganda Advanced Certificate of Education in 1997. She was admitted to Makerere University, Uganda's largest and oldest public university, graduating with a Bachelor of Mass Communication degree in 2002. Later, she was awarded a Master's degree in Human Rights, also from Makerere University.

She also holds a Diploma in Strategic Leadership Management, from Chartered Management Institute, in the United Kingdom, obtained in 2010. In addition, she holds two other diplomas, one a Postgraduate Diploma in Management and the other a Postgraduate Diploma in Monitoring and Evaluation, both awarded by Uganda Management Institute, in 2012 and 2013 respectively.

== Career ==
From 2004 until 2015, Nabakooba served in the Uganda Police Force, where she held various positions, including as the spokesperson for the Police Force, from 2011 until 2015. Other responsibilities during that period, included as Secretary to Exodus Savings and Credit Cooperative Society Limited, the savings and credit co-operative society of Uganda Police (UP) personnel and their families. She left the UP for active politics in June 2015.

In the 2016 general elections, Nabakooba was elected as Mityana District Woman Representative on the ruling National Resistance Movement political party ticket. During her tenure, she has faced criticism and threats over her position regarding the parliamentary Age-Limit Bill She has also faced criticism over the delayed Kasese Report.

In a cabinet reshuffle on 14 December 2019, Nabakooba was appointed Minister of Information, ICT and Communication, replacing Frank Tumwebaze, who was appointed Minister of Labour, Gender, Youth Services and Social Development.

== Other considerations ==
Woman MP. Currently she chairs the Uganda parliamentary committee on defense and internal affairs and is a member of both the parliamentary business committee and the parliamentary committee on commissions, state authorities and state enterprises. She belongs to the ruling National Resistance Movement.
