= Baba TV Uganda =

Television channel in Uganda

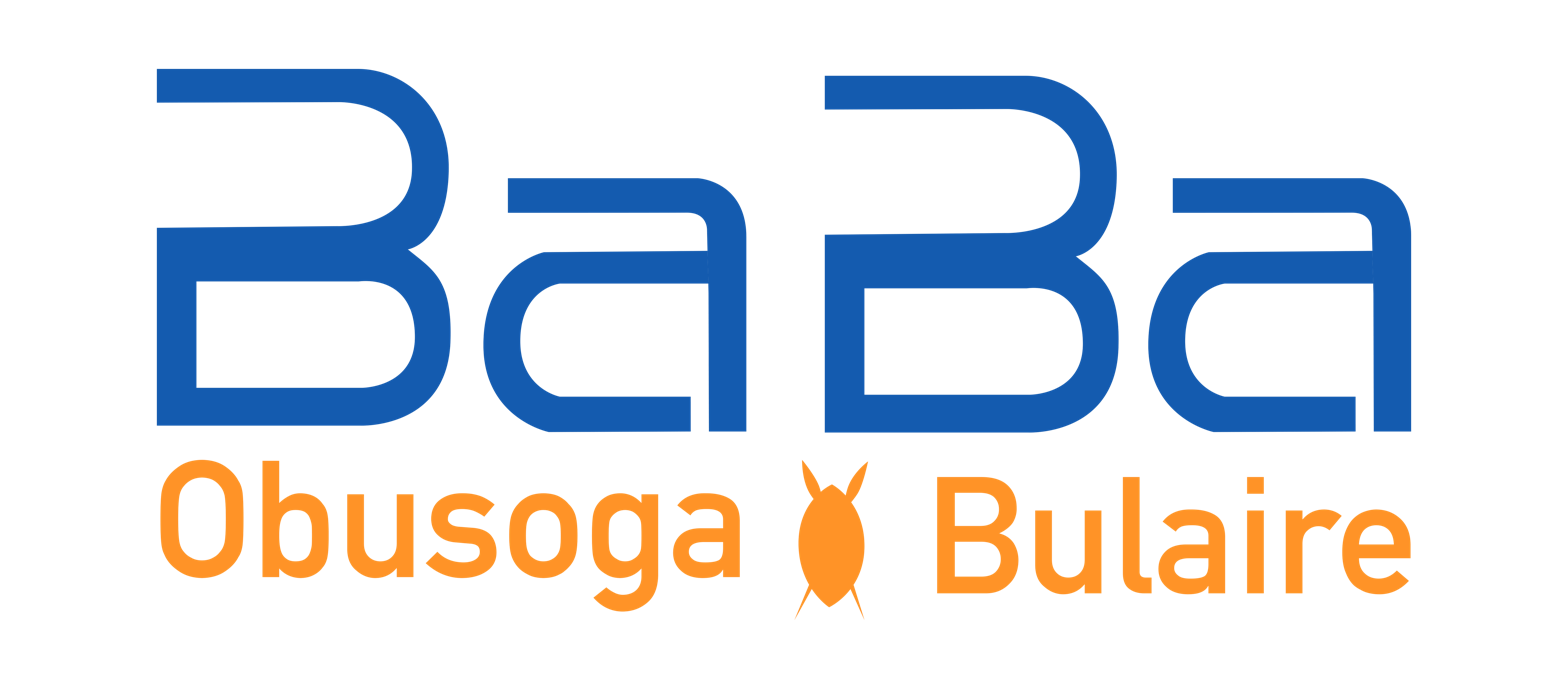
- Type: Broadcasting News, Topical discussions, Entertainment, Drama series, Movies
- Country: Uganda
- Headquarters: Baba TV Complex, Plot 22, Ntinda-Kisaasi Rd

Programming
- Language(s): Lusoga, Luganda, English
- Picture format: HDTV 1080i

Ownership
- Owner: Balyeku Moses Grace
- Parent: Baba Media Group (BMG)
- Sister channels: 87.7 Baba FM

History
- Launched: 17 December 2017

Links
- Webcast: www.babatv.co.ug/live
- Website: www.babatv.co.ug

Baba TV (short for Basoga Baino Television) is a television channel in Uganda with viewership primarily concentrated in the country's eastern and central regions. It maintains studios in Jinja City and Kampala. It airs programming in Lusoga, Luganda, and English.

== History ==
Baba TV began broadcasting in August 2017 and is owned by Balyeku Moses Grace , former member of Parliament for Jinja West.

In 2019, Baba TV launched on DStv in Uganda. The station was launched on GOtv, the only digital platform that did not include it, in 2021.

On 27 July 2020, 2020, journalist Basajja Mivule, who hosted the political talk show Fumitiriza (Reflect) on Baba TV, was arrested at the Kampala studios; it was noted that he was critical of President Yoweri Museveni. Mivule was later suspended from the station.
