= Eunice Namatende =

Hon. Namatende Eunice

Woman Member of Parliament for Bugiri District
- Incumbent
- Assumed office 2026

Personal details
- Born: August 22, 1985 (age 41) Nankoma Sub-county, Bugiri District, Uganda
- Party: National Resistance Movement (NRM)
- Spouse: David Mukwaya
- Children: 3
- Parent(s): Christopher Bameka and Sarah Naigaga
- Education: Bachelor of Education, Ndejje University; Postgraduate Diploma in Education and Institutional Management, Ndejje University; Bachelor of Social Sciences, Makerere University; Master of Public Administration, Uganda Christian University
- Occupation: Politician, pastor, educator
- Profession: Teacher

Namatende Eunice (born August 22, 1985), also known as Umeme Masanhalaze, is a Ugandan politician, pastor, and educator. She is currently the woman Member of Parliament for Bugiri District in the 12th Parliament of Uganda, representing the National Resistance Movement.

== Personal life and education ==
She is a resident of Bugiri District. She was born on August 22, 1985, in Nankoma Sub-county, Bugiri, to Christopher Bameka and his wife, Sarah Naigaga. She has three children with her husband, David Mukwaya.

She attended Buckley High School in Iganga for primary school and later joined Iganga Secondary School for her Uganda Certificate of Education, which she completed in 2001. She then joined Budini Secondary School in Kaliro, where she pursued the Uganda Advanced Certificate of Education (UACE) studies, leaving in 2003. She later joined Ndejje University, and was awarded a bachelor's degree in education in 2006 and returned to Ndejje for a Postgraduate Diploma in Education and Institutional Management. She holds a Bachelor of Social Sciences from Makerere University and a Master of Public Administration from Uganda Christian University.

== Career ==
She is a teacher by profession and a pastor attached to Miracle Centre Seeta.

She secured the parliamentary seat alongside Grace Kiirya Wanzala of Butembe County in Jinja District after their fifth attempt to the 12th Parliament as the Bugiri District Woman Member of Parliament, following 20 years of repeated electoral defeats. In 2006, Namatende first contested as a Forum for Democratic Change flag-bearer but repeatedly lost to the National Resistance Movement candidate, Agnes Taaka Wejuli.

She later joined the National Resistance Movement political party in 2024 before contesting for the Bugiri Municipality Member of Parliament seat under the Forum for Democratic Change political party in the 2018 by-elections, where she also lost to Jeema's Asuman Basalirwa. In 2025, Namatende contested the National Resistance Movement primaries for the Bugiri District Woman Member of Parliament seat against Taka Wejuli and won, thereby becoming the party's flag bearer. She served as the Forum for Democratic Change (FDC) General Secretary for Bugiri District.

She began her political career in 2006 at the age of 19–21 when she stepped into the national spotlight and contested for the Woman Member of Parliament seat under the opposition Forum for Democratic Change (FDC), but lost. She later returned to the polls in 2011 and again in 2016, when Justine Kasule Lumumba was elevated to the position of Secretary General within the National Resistance Movement political party, but she lost again. In 2018, she contested the Bugiri Municipality by-election against Asuman Basalirwa of JEEMA, and in 2021, she again lost the Woman Member of Parliament seat. In 2023, she changed her political party to the National Resistance Movement, marking a major shift in her political journey.

Before joining politics, she worked as the program officer for a safe motherhood initiative and as a water-sanitation consultant.

== See also ==
- List of members of the twelfth Parliament of Uganda
- Agnes Taaka
- Asuman Basalirwa
- Grace Kiirya Wanzala
