= Stephen Mallinga =

Ugandan politician

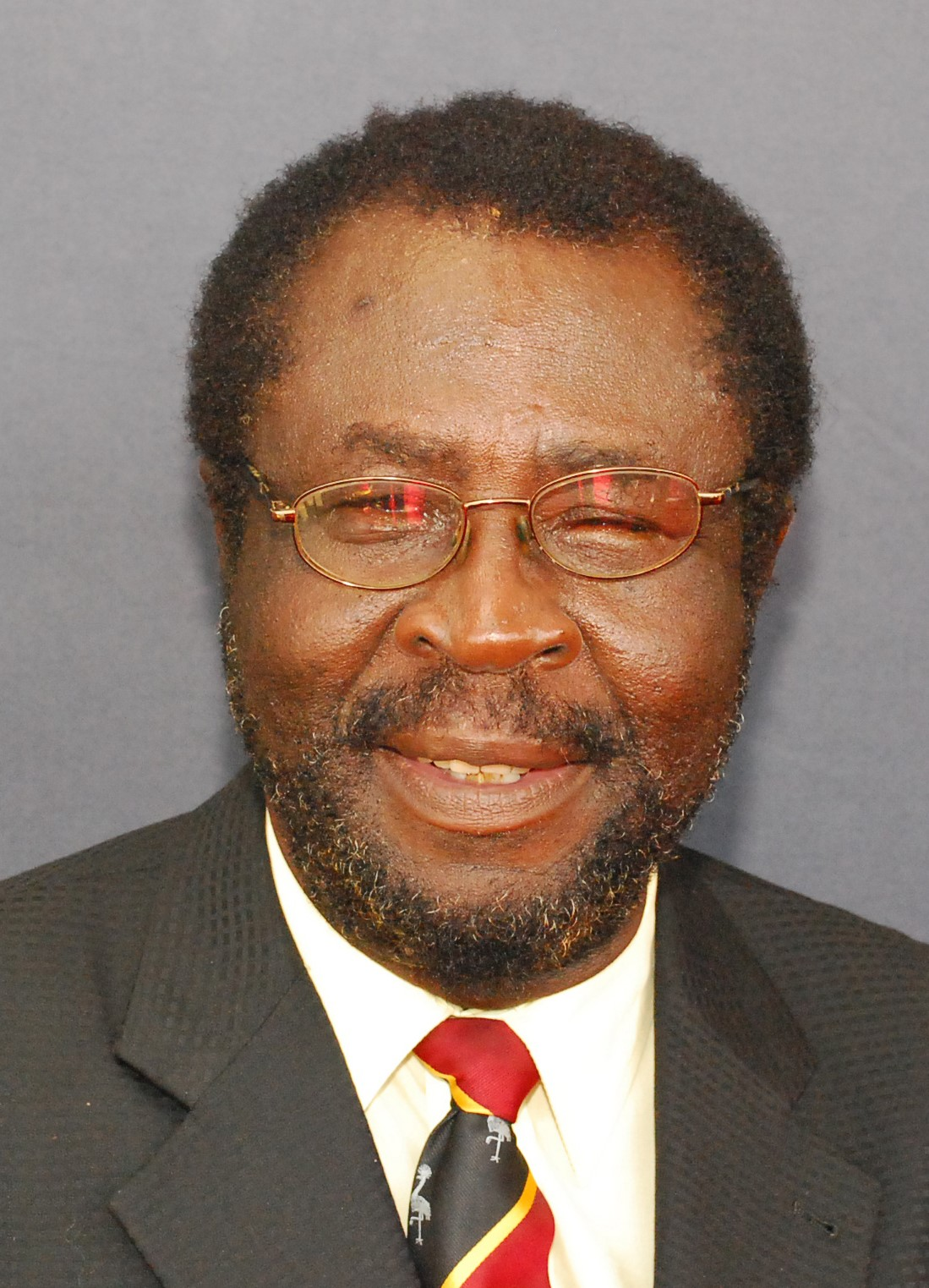
- Born: November 17, 1943; Uganda
- Died: April 11, 2013 (aged 69)
- Citizenship: Uganda
- Education: Makerere University (Bachelor of Medicine and Bachelor of Surgery); American College of Surgeons (Fellow of the American College of Surgeons); International College of Surgeons (Fellow of the International College of Surgeons)
- Occupations: Obstetrician, Gynecologist & Politician
- Years active: 1973 — 2013
- Known for: Politics
- Spouse: Beatrice Mallinga

Stephen Oscar Mallinga (17 November 1943 – 11 April 2013) was a Ugandan medical doctor and politician. At the time of his death, he was the Minister of Disaster Preparedness and Refugees. He was appointed to that position on 27 May 2011. He replaced Tarsis Kabwegyere, who was dropped from the Cabinet. From 2006 until 2011, he served as Uganda's Minister of Health. He was also the elected Member of Parliament (MP), representing the Butebo County Constituency, in Pallisa District. He was buried on 19 April 2013 in Pallisa.

== Background and education ==
He was born in Pallisa District on 17 November 1943. He attended Ntare School for O level and Nabumali High school for his A level. He held the degree of Bachelor of Medicine and Bachelor of Surgery, obtained from Makerere University, back when the university was still part of the University of East Africa. He was a Fellow of the American College of Surgeons, specializing in obstetrics and gynecology. He was also a Fellow of the International College of Surgeons.

== Career ==
Between 1973 and 1977, he served as a consultant at Cook County Hospital, in Chicago, Illinois, United States. From 1978 until 1985, he served as the chairperson, in the Department of Obstetrics and Gynecology at Jackson Park Hospital in Chicago, Illinois. He then served as a consultant at Ingalls Memorial Hospital, in Harvey, Illinois, a suburb of Chicago. In 1996, Dr. Mallinga returned to Uganda and entered politics. He was elected Member of Parliament for Butebo County, in Pallisa District, in 1996, a position he held up to his death. He served as Uganda's Minister of Health from 2006 until 2011, when he was assigned to his last cabinet appointment. Originally a member of the Uganda People's Congress political party, he joined the ruling National Resistance Movement on 1 March 2005.

== Death ==
Dr. Malinga collapsed at his country home in Pallisa District on Thursday, 11 April 2013. He was later pronounced dead the same day. He was 69 years old.

== See also ==
- Parliament of Uganda
- Cabinet of Uganda
- Government of Uganda
- Pallisa District
