= Tumusiime Rushedge =

Ugandan writer (1941–2008)

- Born: Tumusiime Rushedge; March 1, 1941; Bushenyi District, Uganda
- Died: 2008 (aged 66–67); Kabwohe, Uganda
- Education: Makerere University, Ntare School
- Occupations: Medical doctor, writer
- Writing career
- Pen name: Tom Rush
- Genre: Fiction

Tumusiime Rushedge (1 March 1941 – 2008) was a Ugandan surgeon, pilot, novelist, cartoonist and newspaper columnist. He was known as "Tom Rush". He wrote a weekly column in the Sunday Vision, called "Old Fox". He was the brain behind the cartoon strip "Ekanya", which was published daily in the New Vision. The cartoons centred on the drunken character Ekanya and his struggling wife Rosie, and has remained popular since the early 1970s. He is the author of a novel, The Corrupt, the Quick and the Dead.

== Early life and education ==
Tumusiime was born on 1 March 1941 in Buhweju county, Bushenyi District. He was the first-born of seven children, born to the Rev. Andereya Rushedge and Eseza Bantu. He grew up in a Christian home and during his childhood, he was greatly involved in Emmanuel Church Kabwohe as a drummer calling worshippers to Sunday service.

He attended Kibubura Boys Primary School in Ibanda, for his primary education. For secondary education, he went on to Mbarara High School (1954–1957) and Ntare School (1958–1960). He designed the school badge of Ntare school while a student there. He studied medicine at Makerere University in 1961. There, again he excelled and in 1966 he graduated with honours, going on to specialise in ear, nose and throat (ENT). He attained a postgraduate diploma at Medical School. He went for further studies in the US and attained a master's degree in surgery in Chicago. For his accomplishment in the medical fields of ENT and neurology, he was awarded a professorship.

== Published works ==
- The Corrupt, the Quick and the Dead. Fountain Publishers. 2012. ISBN 978-9970-25-129-2.
- Ekanya 25: Selected cartoon and story highlights of EKANYA since his inception in 1969 AD /Tumusiime-Rushedge. TAI-PAN Publication. 1994.
- Ekanya: The Side Splitter. Uganda Publishing House. 1973.
- The bull's horn. Oxford University Press. 1972.
