= Wazalendo Savings and Credit Cooperative Society =

Financial services company of Uganda

- Type: Private
- Industry: Financial services
- Founded: 2005; 21 years ago
- Headquarters: Bombo, Uganda
- Key people: Major General Samuel Kavuma; Chairman; Colonel Joseph Freddy Onata; CEO
- Products: Loans, Savings, Investments
- Revenue: ▲:Aftertax:UGX:54.9 billion (US$15.3 million) (2021)
- Total assets: UGX:630.7 billion (US$176.3 million) (2021)
- Website: Homepage

Wazalendo Savings and Credit Cooperative Society (WSACCO), also referred to as Wazalendo Sacco, is a savings and credit co-operative society in Uganda. It is an institutional Sacco composed of Uganda People's Defence Force (UPDF) personnel and their families, UPDF Reserve Forces, and staff of Uganda's Ministry of Defence. WSACCO is affiliated with the Uganda Co-operative Savings and Credit Union Limited and with the Uganda Co-operative Alliance.

== Overview ==
WSACCO was established on 22 September 2005 with initial savings of about US$96,000 (UGX:238 million). Membership is restricted to persons in active service with the UPDF and their families, UPDF veterans and their families, and staff of the Ministry of Defence in Uganda and their families. The main objective is to mobilize savings and make loans to members at reasonable interest rates to improve their welfare. WSACCO adopted “Save for the Future Development” as its slogan. By 30 June 2011, 61,482 members had joined. By February 2012, membership had increased to 65,741 and total savings were valued at approximately US$9.23 million (UGX:23 billion), making WSACCO the largest savings credit union in Uganda. As of April 2014 the WSACCO's total assets were valued at approximately US$43.7 million (UGX:109 billion) with shareholders' equity of about US$30.1 million (UGX:75 billion) and a loan portfolio estimated at US$35 million (UGX:87 billion).

As of December 2014, the WSACCO's membership had increased to over 73,000. Shareholders equity stood at USh67.4 billion (US$23.4 million). Total assets were valued at USh131.1 billion (US$45.5 million). The total loan book stood at USh116.3 billion (US$40.4 million). WSACCO made after-tax profits of USh9.5 billion (US$3.3 million), for the calendar year ending 31 December 2014.

As of 31 December 2021, the Sacco's membership exceeded 91,000. Total assets were UGX:630.7 billion (US$176.3 mullion). Shareholders' equity was UGX:219.8 billion (US$61.4 million). The Sacco's total loan book at that time was UGX:484.4 billion (US$135.4 million). WSACCO made after-tax profit of UGX:54.9 billion (US$15.3 million) in calendar year 2021.

== Branch network ==
As of March 2015, WSACCO maintained the following branches:

1. Achol-pii Branch - Achol-pii
2. Arua Branch - Arua UPDF Barracks
3. Head Office - Bombo UPDF Barracks
4. Bombo Branch - Bombo
5. Entebbe Branch - Entebbe
6. Gulu Branch - Gulu
7. Jinja Branch - Jinja
8. Kakiri Banch - Kakiri
9. Kotido Branch - Nakaprimoli, Kotido District*
10. Masaka Branch - Masaka
11. Masindi Branch - Masindi
12. Mbale Branch - Mbale
13. Mbarara Branch - Mbarara
14. Moroto Banch - Moroto
15. Mubende Branch - Mubende
16. Muhooti Branch - Muhooti
17. Nakasongola Branch - Nakasongola UPDF Air Base
18. Ssingo Branch - Kaweweeta, Nakaseke District
19. Mogadishu Branch - Somalia

(*) = Non-Networked branches

== Governance ==
As of March 2022, the Board of Directors of the society included the following:

Board Members

- Chairman - Major General Sam Kavuma
- Vice Chairman - Lieutenant Colonel Allan Kitanda
- Treasurer - Lieutenant Colonel Benon Kato
- Member Central - Captain Isaac Bisaalu
- Member Gender - Major Mariam Kagoro
- Member Western - Captain Dathan Bunanukye
- Member Eastern - Captain Norah Ongodia
- Member Northern - Major Peter Tuhairwe
- Member West Nile - Staff Sergeant Peter Osuko

SUPCO Members

- Chairman SUPCO - Brigadier Simon Ocan
- Vice Chairman SUPCO - Colonel Justus Rukundo
- Secretary SUPCO - Major Alexander Asiimwe.

== See also ==
- Banking in Uganda
- Economy of Uganda
- Exodus Sacco
