= Arthur Gakwandi =

Ugandan writer (1943–present)

- Born: Arthur Gakwandi; 1943 (age 82–83); Uganda
- Occupations: Writer, diplomat, story teller
- Writing career
- Genre: Fiction
- Notable awards: Commonwealth Writers Prize 2008

Arthur Gakwandi is a novelist, short story writer and diplomat. He wrote "Kosiya Kifefe", the fifth work of literature written by a Ugandan to feature on the Ugandan syllabus since independence. He is a lecturer in the Literature Department at Makerere University. He was Commonwealth Writers Prize judge for Africa in 2008.

== Early life and education ==
Gakwandi was born in Kajara. He attended Ntare School in Mbarara and later Makerere University college where he earned his BA. He later received an MLit degree from the University of Edinburgh. After years of teaching literature at Makerere, he joined the Ugandan diplomatic service in 1998 and served in various capacities as an ambassador.

== Pan-Africanism ==
Gakwandi theorized a re-imagined African continent, due to his belief that "political restructuring of the continent is a more important priority that needs to be addressed before economic restructuring can bring about the desired results." Moreover, Gakwandi argues that the colonially-inherited borders are the source of the small size of the majority of African states, causing the levels of poverty, dependency, underdevelopment, and ethnic conflict that is currently experienced in the region. Thus, Gakwandi proposed the creation of a new political map of Africa that would eliminate landlocked countries, as a way to mitigate border disputes, reunite African nationalities currently divided by the colonial borders, provide new states with an adequate resource base, ease existing intrastate ethnic tensions, enhance Africa's world standing, and reduce inter-ethnic tensions. With these critical objectives in mind, Gakwandi proposed a new political map of Africa consisting of seven African conglomerate states to represent the critical regions of Africa. These seven new states consisted of the Sahara Republic, Senegambia, Central Africa and Swahili Republic, Ethiopia, Swahili Republic, Mozambia, and Madagascar. The Sahara Republic state would encompass North Africa, Senegambia would encompass West Africa, the Central Africa and Swahili Republic would encompass Central Africa, Ethiopia would encompass modern-day Ethiopia as well as Eritrea, the Swahili Republic would include East Africa and art of Central Africa, Mozambia would include Southern Africa. In Gakwandi's imagining, Madagascar would remain as it currently stands and would not be incorporated into a new republic.

== Published works ==
=== Novels ===
- Kosiya Kifefe. East African Education Publishers. 1997. ISBN 9789966468383.

=== Commentary ===
- Uganda Pocket facts. Fountain Publishers. 1997. ISBN 9970-02-145-1.

=== Literary Criticism ===
- The novel and contemporary experience in Africa. London : Heinemann. 1977. ISBN 9780841903067.
