= Army Special Operations Brigade (Kenya) =

Army Special Forces

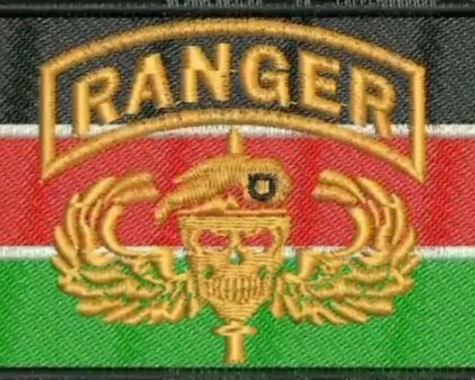
- Insignia of the 40th Ranger Regiment
- Country: Kenya
- Branch: Kenya Army
- Role: Special operations
- Part of: Kenya Special Operations Forces
- Garrison/HQ: Gilgil, Kenyatta Barracks
- Engagements: Mount Elgon insurgency (2005-2008); Operation Linda Nchi (2011-2012); Battle of Kismayo (2012); MONUSCO (2021-present); Kivu conflict (2022-present)

Insignia
- Unit headgear: Green beret

The Army Special Operations Brigade is a special operations forces unit of the Kenyan Army, tasked with airborne operations, commando raids, reconnaissance, counter-insurgency, infiltration and other specialized forms of warfare. This is the umbrella body of specialized units in the Kenya Army tasked with special operations based at Gilgil, Naivasha. The brigade forms part of Kenya Special Forces with other specialized units from the Kenya Air Force and Kenya Navy.

== Overview of sub-units ==
These units consist of the:

- 20th Parachute Battalion
- 40th Ranger Regiment (40RR)
- 60th Army Special Battalion (60ASB)

=== 20th Parachute Battalion ===
The 20th Parachute Battalion is the regiment's oldest unit formed on March 17, 1983 and presented with its Regimental and Presidential Colours during the 1990 Jamhuri Day celebrations. However the plan to set up the unit was mooted immediately Kenya gained its independence when on October 14, 1964 forty officers were sent to Britain for Parachute Basic Training Course at Royal Air Force Base, Abingdon.

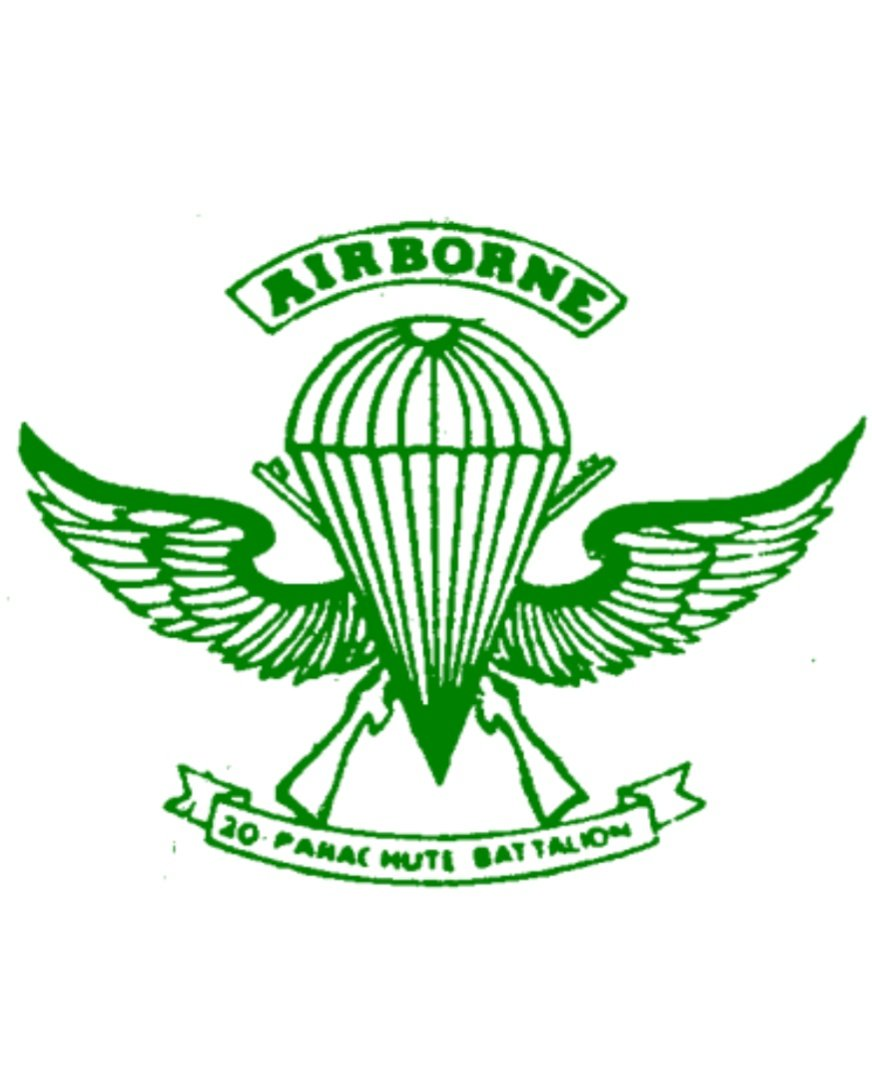
Emblem of the 20th Parachute Battalion

The unit can therefore trace its roots to the 1st Independent Parachute Company that was established on April 24, 1965. The '20 paras' are assigned and equipped for high-risk special operations and the battalion is largely geared towards high-intensity conflicts. Its 'D' Company however was formed with American assistance post 9/11 with an emphasis on counter-insurgency to help combat terror groups within Eastern Africa.

=== 60th Army Special Battalion ===
The 60th Army Special Battalion (formerly and still often times referred to as the 30th Special Forces Regiment by official KDF media) is the Army's premier "tier 1" Special Operations unit, tasked with carrying out warfare under traditional Special Forces doctrine which includes: Unconventional Warfare (UW), Counter Terrorism (CT), Direct Action (DA), Special Reconnaissance, Foreign Internal Defense (FID), and Counter Insurgency (COIN). The unit draws its core identity primarily from the British Special Air Service.

40th Ranger Strike Force

The 40th Ranger Strike Force (Sometimes called the 40th Ranger Regiment or 40th Ranger Battalion) is the premier light infantry unit within the Special Operations Brigade. The Ranger Strike force almost directly mirrors the operational doctrine of the United States 75th Ranger Regiment, and is tasked with handling large scale direct action raids. Other capabilities include airborne insertion and quick reaction force ability. The unit has been extensively deployed to support the United Nations Organization Stabilization Mission in the Democratic Republic of the Congo, under the KENQRF (Kenya Quick Reaction Force) contingent, providing critical rapid response, security patrol and Civil-Military assistance (CIMIC) to the population of Eastern DRC.

== Training ==
All operators within the Army Special Operations Brigade undergo training at the Special Operations Training School (SOTS) in Naivasha before undergoing further specialized training abroad and locally with friendly foreign forces. The 20th Paras largely provides the pool of recruits to both the Rangers and Special Forces units and is viewed as the first port of call for potential recruits. The Paras undergo traditional airborne training at an independent Parachute Training School (PTS) and are geared towards fighting high-intensity conflicts with insertion behind enemy lines through airborne jumps.

The SOTS runs as an independent arm within the regiment and it is filled with local trainers who graduated from the first batch at the Army National Guard Warrior Training Center at Fort Benning. Upon successful completion of the course the pioneer class numbering around 100 formed the first company of the unit. This batch would form the company's mid-level leaders and trainers at SOTS with the first locally trained class graduating on 18 March 2011. The 40th RSF training curriculum is modeled along the United States Army Rangers through the Basic Ranger Course. The training curriculum largely mirrors US Army Ranger School, with immense emphasis on patrolling, survival and execution of small unit tactics in various environments. Rangers spend three weeks in Isiolo (Desert Phase), a further three weeks in Mount Kenya (Mountain Phase) for high altitude training before moving to Manda Bay (Jungle Phase).

The 30th SF unlike the Rangers are not a rapid deployment unit and are trained along British SAS lines with the unit aligning far more within the traditional roles of special forces. This unit is trained for sustained operations in hostile territory and assimilation with host communities. Language skills are mandatory in the 30th SF and members are expected to be well versed with details on power grids, water supplies, roads and host community politics when deployed thus the threshold for potential recruits is higher with a mean score of C+ in the Kenya Certificate of Secondary Education. Basic combat training lasts nine weeks, advanced individual training lasts four weeks and airborne training lasts three weeks and upon completion recruits are granted the opportunity to further train overseas namely in the United States and Israel. The attrition rate leads to only 25 percent of volunteers and selected candidates graduating after two years of training.

== Notable Operations ==
Operation Okoa Maisha was the first deployment of these units particularly from the 20th Parachute Battalion. The operation was launched as an attempt to crush a three year insurgency in the Mount Elgon District by the Sabaot Land Defence Force and was successful. SLDF leader Wycliffe Matakwei was encircled and killed by special forces on 16 May 2008 effectively marking the end of the insurgency. They were also involved in the killing of top SLDF commanders Raphael Bera and David Sichei in fighting at caves around Mount Elgon the previous month.

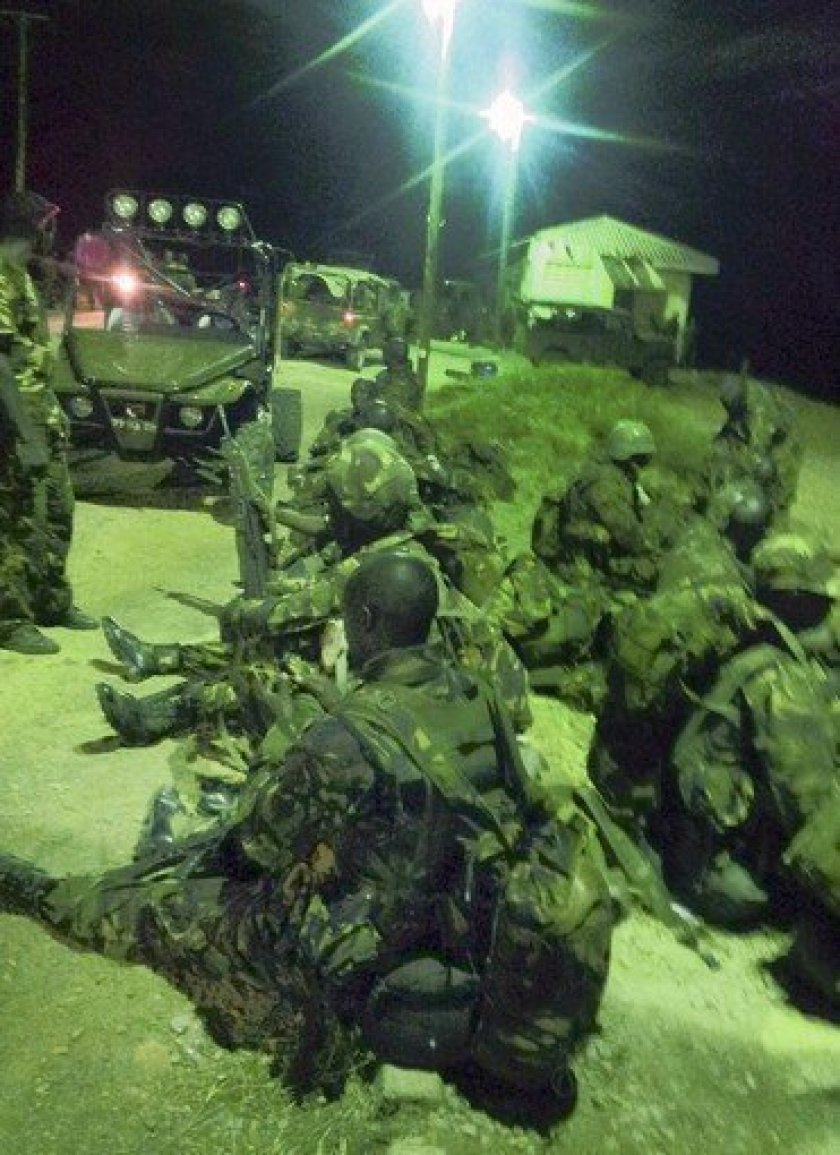
Army Rangers during Operation Sledge Hammer

They have seen extensive action in Somalia during Operation Linda Nchi and the subsequent rehatting to AMISOM with their most notable achievement being an amphibious landing at the port city of Kismayo. During the operation assigned the name 'Operation Sledge Hammer' ASOB operators were the first to land on the beaches outside the city and captured strategic targets before linking up with regular infantry units and their Somali allies in the Battle of Kismayo. The pre-dawn operation was launched on 28 September 2012 with an amphibious landing from seven Kenyan naval ships at a beach north of the city. The operation lasted a day and a half with little resistance at first before Al Shabab hastily organized light defences. However by late afternoon the next day Al Shabab forces had largely withdrawn with the old airport and port already captured. They have also allegedly been deployed to Eastern DRC to assist the Congolese military in fighting the ADF.

== Other Units ==
There are other special units found within the Kenya Defence Forces, in the Air Force (Rapid Deployment Squadron) and the Navy (Special Boat Unit, Clearance Diving Unit and the Marine Commando Unit). Notably the existence of a Long Range Surveillance (LRS) group developed with assistance from the Czech Republic's 601st Special Forces Group is known but little information exists on this unit. It is the least known specialized unit of the Kenya Army and is thought to be under the Directorate of Military Intelligence.
