= Omwony Ojwok =

Ugandan politician

State Minister for Economic Monitoring
- In office 2001–2007

Minister for Northern Rehabilitation
- In office 1999–2001

Director of the Ugandan AIDS Commission
- In office 1994–1999

Personal details
- Born: John Omwony Ojwok; 1 June 1947 Abwor, Kotido, Uganda
- Died: 11 November 2007 (aged 60) Mulago, Kampala, Uganda
- Education: Makerere University, University of Geneva

Omwony Ojwok (1 June 1947 – 11 November 2007) was a Ugandan politician, lawyer and a professor who served as director of the Ugandan AIDS Commission, Minister for Northern Rehabilitation and State Minister for Economic Monitoring.

== Early life and education ==
Ojwok was born on June 1, 1947, in Abwor, Labwor County in Kotido District. He attended Lacor Seminary in Gulu for his Junior Leaving Certificate and in 1963, he joined St. Mary's College Kisubi. He atteded Wauwatosa East High School in Wisconsin and later joined Ntare School in Mbarara for his A-level education. He then joined Makerere University where he graduated with Bachelor of Laws in 1972. He held a Master's degree in international relations, a master's degree in international law specializing in the Third World Investments at the University of Geneva. In 1978, Ojwok pursued his Doctorate in Law in Geneva but later relocated Dar-es Salaam where he completed it from.

== Career ==
From 1994 to 1999, Ojwok served as the Director of Uganda AIDS Commission. From 1999 to 2001, he served as the Minister for Northern Rehabilitation also served State Minister for Economic Monitoring between 2001 and 2007.

Ojwok, being a professor, lectured in several universities including University of Oxford, University of Toronto, University of Dar-es Salaam and University of Nairobi. Ojok was the head of External activities in Uganda National Liberation Front.

== Personal life ==
Ojwok was married to Florence Adongo Omwony who is also a politician who represented Labwo County in the 8th Parliament of Uganda after a by-election.

== Death ==
He died on 27 November 2007 of heart failure at the age of 60.

== See also ==
- Persis Namuganza
- Cabinet of Uganda
- Member of Parliament
- List of members of the eleventh Parliament of Uganda
- Richard Gafabusa
- Parliament of Uganda
- Member of Parliament
