= Ministry of Lands, Housing and Urban Development (Uganda) =

Government ministry of Uganda

Coordinates: 00°18′51″N 32°35′16″E

- Coat of Arms of Uganda

Ministry overview
- Type: Ministry
- Jurisdiction: Government of Uganda
- Headquarters: 13-15 Parliament Avenue; Kampala, Uganda
- Ministry executive: Judith Nabakooba, Minister of Lands, Housing and Urban Development
- Website: mlhud.go.ug

The Ministry of Lands, Housing and Urban Development (MLHUD), is a cabinet-level government ministry of Uganda. It is responsible for "policy direction, national standards and coordination of all matters concerning lands, housing and urban development". The ministry is headed by a cabinet minister, currently Judith Nabakooba.

== Location ==
The headquarters of the ministry are located at 13-15 Parliament Avenue, in the Central Division of Kampala, Uganda's capital and largest city. The coordinates of the ministry headquarters are 0°18'51.0"N, 32°35'16.0"E (Latitude:0.314167; Longitude:32.587778).

== Subministries ==
The ministry is divided into three sub-ministries, each headed by a minister of state.

- Minister of State, Lands Dr. Sam Mayanja
- Minister of State, Housing Persis Namuganza
- Minister of State, Urban Development Obiga Kania

== Organisational structure ==
Administratively, the ministry is divided into the following directorates and departments:

- Directorate of Land Management
  - Department of Surveys and Mapping
  - Department of Land Valuation
  - Department of Land Registration
  - Department of Land Administration
- Directorate of Physical Planning and Urban Development
  - Department of Physical Planning
  - Department of Urban Development
  - Department of Land Use Regulation and Compliance
- Directorate of Housing
  - Department of Human Settlement
  - Department of Housing Development and Estates Management
- Department of Finance and Administration
- Planning and Quality Assurance Department

== Tasks ==
In February 2010, the government of Uganda, in partnership with Thomson Reuters and with funding from the World Bank, began implementation of the Land information System. The system involves the digitization of Uganda's land registry, beginning with key geographical and administrative areas and then rolling the program out to include the entire country. This has improved the country's rank in the ease of doing business and has shortened turn-around times in processes like obtaining a mortgage, selling and buying land, and performing land surveys.

== List of ministers ==
=== Minister of Lands, Housing and Urban Development ===
- Judith Nabakooba (8 June 2021-present)
- Beti Kamya-Turwomwe (14 December 2019 - 8 June 2021)
- Betty Amongi (6 June 2016 - 14 December 2019)
- Daudi Migereko (27 May 2011 - 6 June 2016)
- Omara Atubo (1 June 2006 - 27 May 2011)

=== Minister of Land, Water and the Environment ===
- Kahinda Otafiire (2003 - 1 June 2006)

== See also ==
- Politics of Uganda
- Cabinet of Uganda
- Parliament of Uganda
