= Kenya Special Forces =

Special Forces Operations Command
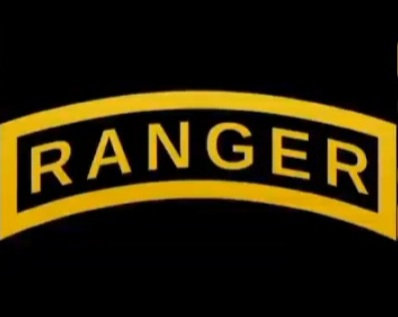
- Patch of the Kenya Army Rangers
- Country: Kenya
- Role: Special Operations
- Size: Army Special Operations Brigade (Kenya); Rapid Deployment Squadron; Special Operations Squadron
- Part of: Kenya Defence Forces

The Kenya Special Forces are units tasked with special operations found within the three branches of the Kenya Defence Forces and are under Special Forces Operations Command. The Army has the largest number of these units under the Army Special Operations Brigade containing the 20th Parachute Battalion (20th Paras), 30th Special Forces Battalion (30 SF) and 40th Ranger Strike Force (40 RSF). The Air Force has a Rapid Deployment Squadron (RDS) tasked with retrieving airmen behind enemy lines and it is the most recent addition to Kenya's specialized military units. The Navy has two units under its Special Operations Squadron which are the Clearance Diving Unit (CDU) and the main Special Boat Unit (SBU) formed with American assistance in the mid 2000s. The Special Operations Training School (SOTS) in Gilgil, Naivasha serves as the premier training establishment for all potential special forces operators. Kenyan special forces have been deployed in Southern Somalia, the Frontier counties of Mandera, Wajir and Garissa on the border with Somalia, Boni Forest near the Somali border and Eastern DRC

== Army Units ==
This is the oldest special forces unit within the Kenya Defence Forces and its Ranger 'D' Company was tasked to combat terrorist activities post 9/11. The unit was brought up with American assistance through the Combined Joint Task Force-Horn of Africa (CJTF-HOA) based in Djibouti and was initially thought to be the sole specialized unit within the Kenya Defence Forces. The 20th Paras are tasked with infiltrating enemy lines during high intensity conflicts, capturing strategic objectives and joint operations with regular infantry units. The unit was deployed near the border with Uganda in Operation Okoa Maisha during the Mt Elgon insurgency in 2008 where although successful in quelling the SLDF they faced accusations of illegal detention and torture.

In the mid 2000s Kenya's Ministry of Defence began looking into forming a new unit of special forces to better serve the military in light of the global war on terror. Kenyan officials were concerned by events in Somalia and approached the U.S. government to help form and train their special forces and commando units, this led to the Kenya Ranger Strike Force Initiative. The American government invested $40M through IMET courses for Ranger and Ranger Instructor courses at Fort Benning. Section 1206 was used to further secure funding for training and equipment, holding Joint Combined Exchange and Training (JCET) and using the East African Regional Security Initiative (EARSI now PREACT) to provide equipment and fund training.

On 18 March 2011 the first class fully taught by Kenyan instructors graduated. This led to the creation of the two newer units; 40th Rangers Strike Force modelled on the U.S. Army Rangers and the 30th Special Forces modelled along the British SAS. The Special Operations Regiment houses all the Army's special and commando units. All special forces operators first undergo training at the Special Operations Training School (SOTS) in Gilgil before being flown abroad for further specialized training. These units were extensively used during Operation Linda Nchi in Southern Somalia and the amphibious landings that led to the fall of the port city of Kismayu. There have also been reports that some operators serving within these units were deployed to Beni, Eastern DRC to help FARDC combat ADF Islamist rebels in the area. In recent times another specialized unit has been rumored to have been set up within the Special Operations Regiment tasked with long range surveillance behind enemy lines.

Not much is known about the Long Range Surveillance (LRS) group. The Czech Republic is thought to be a major partner in helping the Kenya Army build up this unit through its 601 Special Forces Group. This unit is tasked with reconnaissance deep behind enemy lines and are known to have been deployed extensively in Somalia's Gedo region. This unit is however not deemed to be under the army's Special Operations Regiment and it is instead run by the Directorate of Military Intelligence.

== Other Units ==
The Air Force formed the Rapid Deployment Squadron after losing a pilot whose jet developed technical problems over Southern Somalia. The pilot managed to eject before impact in Al Shabaab held territory but was never retrieved. This led to the need of a dedicated force within the Air Force that would be able to carry out search and rescue missions for downed airmen behind enemy lines. The Rapid Deployment Squadron is based at Laikipia Air Base, Nanyuki where Kenya's main Fighter Jet Squadron is also headquartered

The Kenya Navy has had a dedicated Special Boat Unit tasked with interceptions and special operations at high seas. It is rumoured that this unit is based at Manda Bay Naval Base near the Lamu Archipelago with a forward operating base in Kiunga. It was created in 2010 with assistance from the U.S. Navy Special Warfare Combatant- Craft Crewman (SWCC) personnel. The unit works with the Clearance Diving Unit in carrying out special tasks within the Navy. The main operational focus of the unit is controlling maritime traffic between Kenya and Somalia and it employs Twenty-Five Foot Defender Class response craft. Over 200 personnel have been trained in small craft operations through a Comprehensive Maritime Security Course (CMSI) by the U.S. Naval Special Warfare Task Unit (NWSTU).

The Clearance Diving Unit is an older outfit tasked with handling clearance diver missions such as combat diving, explosive ordnance disposal, beach survey and under water inspection but not much more is known about this unit. They are thought to be based at the Kenya Navy headquarters at Mtongwe Naval Base in Mombasa. Recently the Kenya Navy has shown interest in developing a naval tactical marine operations unit to supplement the work of its Special Boat Unit and the Clearance Diving Unit
