= Daudi Migereko =

Ugandan politician

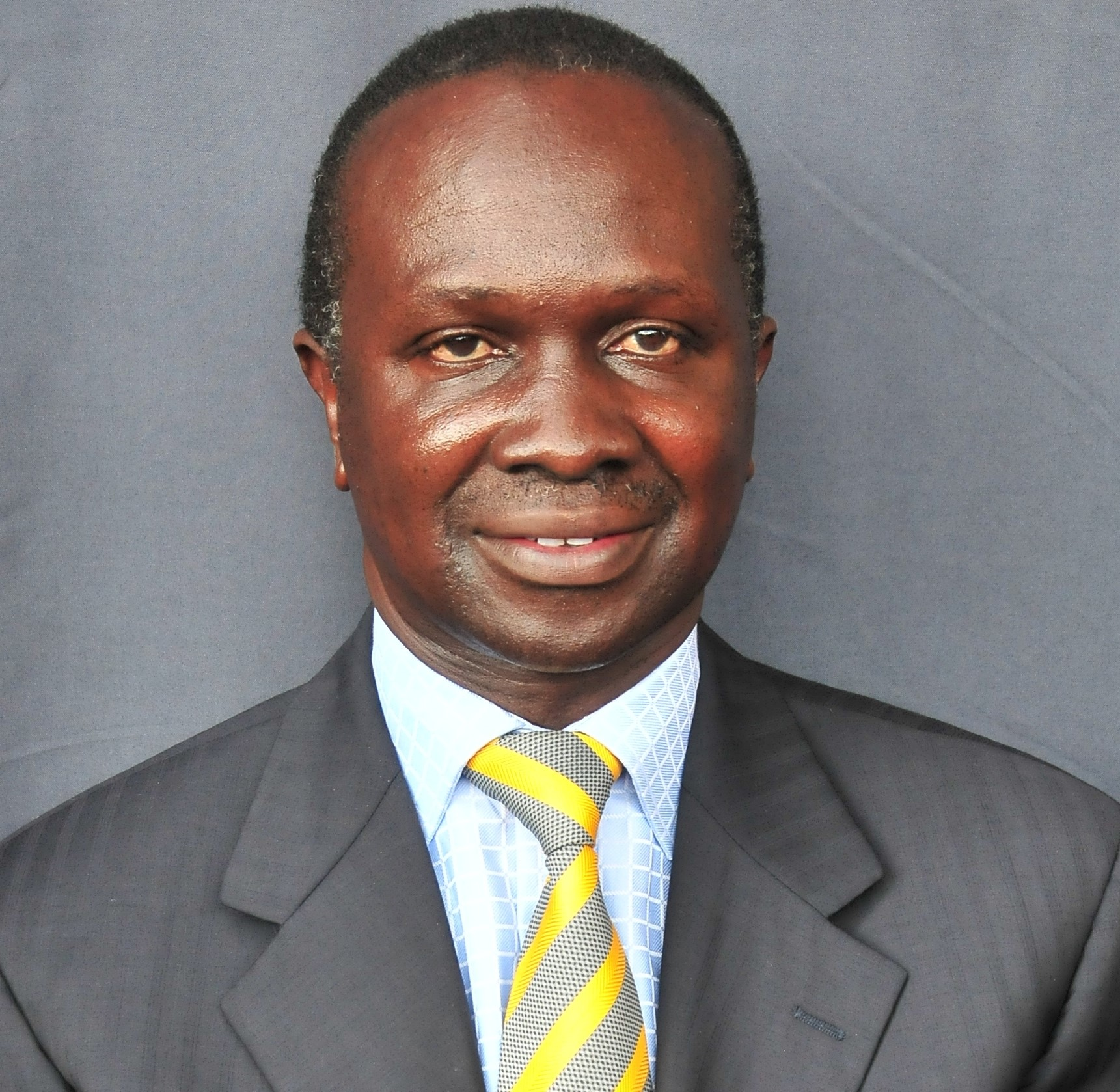
- Born: 26 June 1956 (age 70); Uganda
- Citizenship: Uganda
- Education: Makerere University (BA with Diploma in Education); University of California (MA in Transport Planning & Marketing)
- Occupation: Politician
- Years active: 1986 — present
- Known for: Politics
- Title: Lands Minister; Cabinet of Uganda
- Spouse: Harriet Kate Migereko

Daudi Migereko (born 26 June 1956) is a Ugandan politician who has served as the minister of lands, housing and urban development in the cabinet of Uganda. He was appointed to that position on 27 May 2011. He replaced Omara Atubo, who was dropped from the cabinet. In the cabinet reshuffle of 2016, the president dropped him from this position and replaced him with Betty Amongi. From 16 February 2009 until 27 May 2011, he served as the government's chief whip in the parliament of Uganda. Before that, he was the minister of energy and mineral development in the cabinet. Migereko also represented Butembe County, Jinja District in the parliament from 2006 to 2016, a position he surrendered to Nelson Lufafa who won the seat in the 2016 General Elections.

== Background and education ==
Migereko was born on 26 June 1956 in Jinja District. He graduated from Makerere University with a Bachelor of Arts and a Diploma in Education. His Master of Arts in transport planning and marketing was obtained from the University of California, Santa Barbara, in the United States.

== Work history ==
Between 1986 and 2001, he was the director of operations at Intraco Uganda Limited, a private business. During the same period, he also served as a director on the board of FINCA, a Ugandan microfinance company. In 1996, he was elected to represent Butembe County, Jinja District in the parliament. He has been re-elected to that seat ever since.

In 2001, Daudi Migereko served as the deputy director in the Office of the National Political Commissar in the government. Between 2001 and 2005, he served as the state minister for energy and minerals. In 2005, he was appointed the minister of trade, tourism and industry, where he served until 2006.

In 2006, he was appointed minister of energy and minerals, a position he kept until 16 February 2009 when he was appointed chief whip. In the cabinet reshuffle of 27 May 2011, he was reassigned to the Lands and Urban Development Ministry as a full cabinet minister.

== Other appointments ==
In 2008, Migereko was appointed an honorary member of the International Hydropower Association (IHA). The IHA aims at advancing sustainable development of hydro-power projects. Migereko was recognised for his outstanding contribution to the sector nationally and internationally.

== See also ==
- Government of Uganda

== Photos ==
- Photo of Daudi Migereko In 2012
