= Balyeku Moses Grace =

Ugandan politician and businessman

Hon. Balyeku Moses Grace

Member of Parliament for Jinja West Constituency
- In office 2011–2021
- Preceded by: Harry Kasigwa
- Succeeded by: Timothy Batuwa
- Constituency: Jinja West

Chairperson of the National Resistance Movement, Jinja District
- Incumbent
- Assumed office 2010

Vice Chairperson of the MK Movement
- Incumbent
- Assumed office 2023

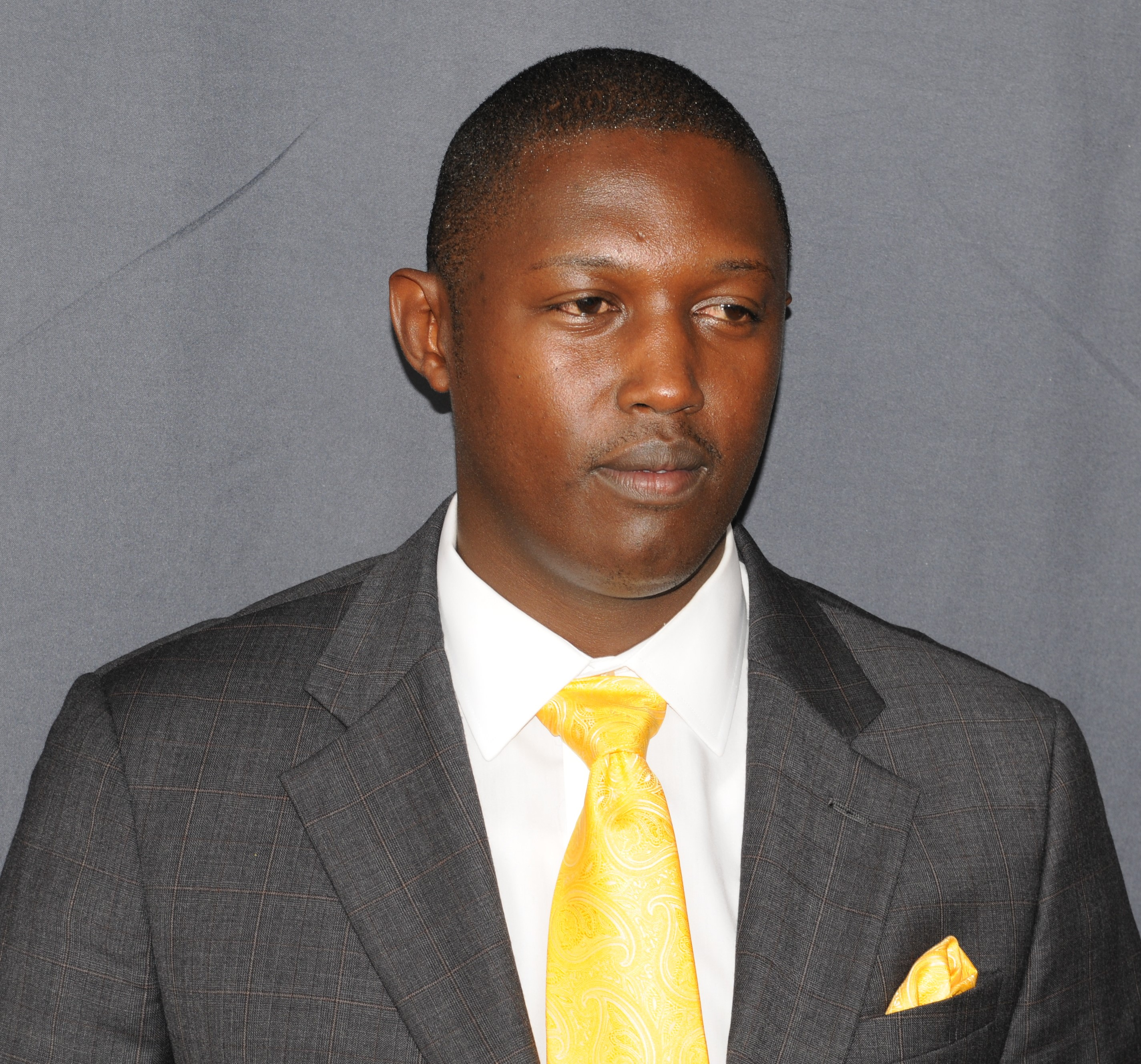
2024 Balyeku Moses Grace.jpg

Balyeku Moses Grace is a Ugandan politician and businessman. He is the former member of parliament for Jinja west constituency. He served as Member of Parliament for Jinja West Constituency for two consecutive terms between 2011 and 2021. He is the proprietor of Baba TV and Baba FM. He was unveiled the vice chairperson of MK movement in 2023.

== Political career ==
Balyeku was in 2010 elected as the National Resistance Movement (NRM) chairperson Jinja District. During the 2011 general elections, Balyeku contested for the Jinja west member of parliament seat against FDC's Harry Kasigwa who was the incumbent at the time. Other contestants included Fred Kasisa (NRM), Simon Muyanga Lutaaya (FDC), and Zaake Kibedi (NRM) among others.

Balyeku won the election and served as Member of Parliament for Jinja West Constituency. During his first term, he undertook community development projects including the construction of market stalls at Mpumudde Market and the extension of water standpipes to Kimaka B Village.

In the 2016 general election, Balyeku was re-elected as Member of Parliament for Jinja West Constituency after defeating Forum for Democratic Change candidate Paul Kawanguzi.

== Investigation by Bamugemereire ==
In 2019, Balyeku was investigated over land-related matters by the Commission of Inquiry into Land Matters chaired by Justice Catherine Bamugemereire. The commission later cleared him of wrongdoing..

== Advocacy ==
While still in parliament, Balyeku advocated for local investors to be recognised and helped by the government. He also used to support traders mostly women SACCOs in his constituency.

In 2020, he returned the shs 20 million which had been given to members of parliament to aid them in the fight against COVID-19.

In the 2021 elections, Balyeku Moses Grace lost the parliamentary seat to FDC's Timothy Batuwa.

In 2025, he won the National Resistance Movement primary election for Jinja South West Constituency, becoming the party's flag bearer for the 2026 general election.
