= Exodus Savings and Credit Cooperative Society Limited =

Savings and credit co-operative society for the Uganda Police

- Company type: Private
- Industry: Financial services
- Founded: 2007
- Headquarters: Kampala, Uganda
- Key people: SCP Dr. Omoding Wilson Otuna chairman
- Products: Loans, savings, investments
- Total assets: UGX:20+ billion (US$5.5 million) (2019)
- Members: 42,000+ (2022)

Exodus Savings and Credit Cooperative Society Limited, also referred to as Exodus Sacco, is a savings and credit co-operative society in Uganda. It is an institutional Sacco, composed of Uganda Police Force (UPF) personnel and their families.

== Overview ==
As of April 2014, it had total assets in excess of UGX:7 billion, with approximately 21,500 members. Membership is restricted to those in active service with the UP and members of their families. The main objective is to mobilize savings from members and make loans to members at reasonable interest rates to improve their welfare. Exodus Sacco is the second-largest security forces-related Sacco in Uganda, behind the much bigger Wazalendo Savings and Credit Cooperative Society. As of December 2019, membership in Exodus Sacco had risen to over 30,000, and total assets were valued in excess of USh20 billion (US$5.5 million).

There is another Uganda Police Sacco called Police Savings Association Limited, which was started in 1989, and the two Saccos compete for members.

== History ==
The Sacco was formed in Kampala, in 2007, to be operated by members of the Uganda Police Force, for the benefit of members of the UPF and their families. The concept was introduced to police units in other areas of the country, with mixed success.

Elyasa

== Governance ==
As of August 2019, Exodus Sacco was governed by a nine-member executive committee, chaired by ASP Kalulu Henry. In December 2019, elections were conducted and Senior Commissioner of Police (SCP) Dr. Omoding Wilson was elected Board Chairperson. Also elected among others, was Senior Commissioner of Police (SCP) Namutebi Hadijja as Chaiperson Supervisory Committee. All these went through a Vetting process under the leadership of Superintendent of Police (SP) Muwonge Abel as Chairperson VetCo.

== See also ==
- Banking in Uganda
- Economy of Uganda
