= Omara Atubo =

Ugandan lawyer, politician

- Born: 14 August 1947 (age 79); Uganda
- Citizenship: Uganda
- Education: Makerere University (Bachelor of Laws); Law Development Centre (Diploma in Legal Practice)
- Occupations: Lawyer, politician
- Years active: 1974–present
- Known for: Politics, Law
- Title: Former Minister of Lands, Housing and Urban Development (2006-2011)

Daniel Omara Atubo is a Ugandan lawyer, educator and politician. He has served, from May 2006 until May 2011, as the Minister of Lands, Housing and Urban Development, in the Ugandan Cabinet, . In the cabinet reshuffle on 27 May 2011, he was dropped from the Cabinet. He represented "Otuke County", in present-day Otuke District in the Ugandan Parliament, between 1987 and 2011. He lost his re-election bid to parliament in March 2011.

== Background and education ==
He was born in Otuke District, which at the time was part of Lira District, on 14 August 1947. Omara Atubo holds the degree of Bachelor of Laws (LLB) from Makerere University where he was Editor-In-Chief of the Makerere Law Journal in 1971. He also holds the Diploma in Legal Practice from the Law Development Center in Kampala.

== Career ==
He started practicing law in 1974 and continues to practice up to today. He worked as a Senior State Attorney from 1972 until 1976. Between 1977 and 1979, he was a Senior Lecturer in Law in Moshi, Tanzania. Between 1985 and 1987, he served as Secretary, Bank of Uganda. During the late 1980s Omara Atubo served as Minister of State for Foreign Affairs, from 1987 until 1991. He was first elected to parliament in 1987 and was continuously a Member of Parliament until 2011. He was appointed as Minister of Lands, Housing & Urban Development, serving in that capacity from May 2006 until he was dropped from the Cabinet in May 2011.

== Personal details ==
Omara Atubo is married. He lists personal interest in human rights, democracy, education, golf, walking and jogging. The website of the Uganda Parliament lists his political affiliation as Independent. In the 2011 national elections, he lost the "Otuke County" seat in Parliament to Deusdedit Jacinto Ogwal of the Uganda People's Congress political party, who is he incumbent Member of Parliament for the constituency.

== Controversy ==
On 15 April 1991 members of the National Resistance Council, the then Parliament, met to discuss a rebel screening programme set up in districts of Northern Uganda, which was causing divisions within the Ugandan Army. Following that meeting three men, including Omara Atubo, then a member of the Ugandan Cabinet, were arrested and charged, along with thirteen others, with treason. The case was later dismissed. Omara Atubo was dropped from the cabinet on account of those allegations.

Just prior to the 2006 presidential and parliamentary elections, Omara Atubo, then a member of the Uganda People's Congress (UPC) disagreed with Miria Obote, the party's president. Eventually Atubo left UPC and contested those elections as an Independent. He won and was offered a cabinet position in the ruling National Resistance Movement government, which he accepted.

== See also ==
- Parliament of Uganda
- Cabinet of Uganda
- Otuke District
