= Sarah Achieng Opendi =

Ugandan politician

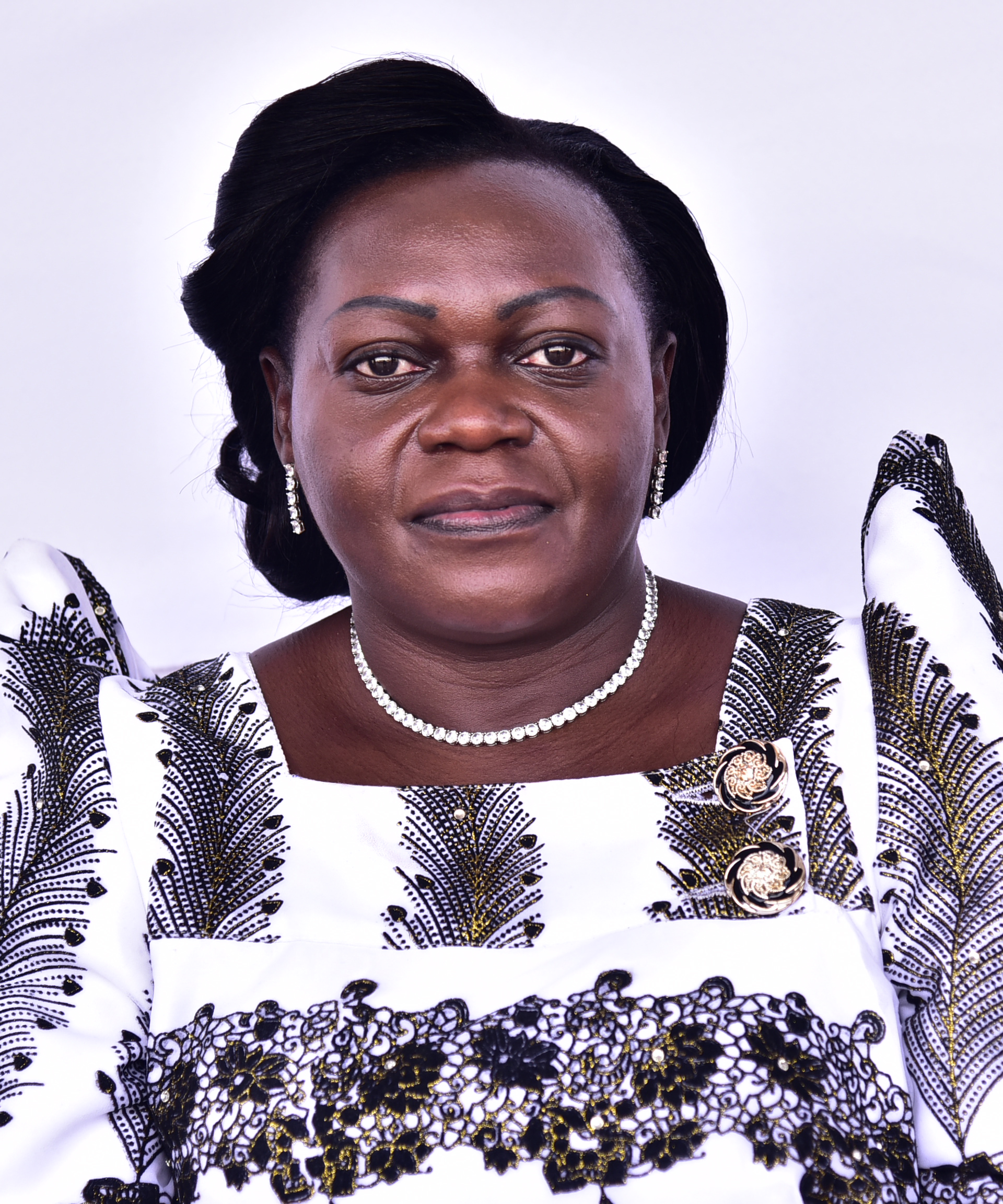
- Born: 6 September 1968 (age 58); Tororo, Uganda
- Citizenship: Uganda
- Education: National College of Business Studies (Diploma in Accounting); Association of Chartered Certified Accountants (Associate Chartered Certified Accountant Level II); Makerere University (Bachelor of Business Administration) (Master of Business Administration)
- Occupations: Accountant and politician
- Years active: 1988–present
- Title: State Minister of Mineral Development

Sarah Achieng Opendi, sometimes Sarah Opendi Achieng (born 6 September 1968), is a Ugandan accountant and politician. She is the state minister of Mineral Development in the Ugandan cabinet, serving since 14 December 2019.

From 6 June 2016 until 14 December 2019, she served as the state minister of Health for General Duties. From 15 August 2012 until 6 June 2016, she served as the minister of State for Primary Healthcare. From 27 May 2011 until 15 August 2012, she served as the state minister for Lands. In the cabinet reshuffle of 1 March 2015, she retained her cabinet post.

== Background and education ==
Opendi was born in Tororo District on 26 September 1968.

She studied accounting, graduating from the National College of Business Studies, in 1994, with the Diploma in Accounting. In 1998, she passed the examinations of the Association of Chartered Certified Accountants, earning the title of Associate Chartered Certified Accountant Level II. That same year, she graduated from Makerere University with a degree of Bachelor of Business Administration. In 2005, she received a degree of Master of Business Administration, also from Makerere.

== Career ==
Opendi's professional career began in 1994 as an Accounts Assistant at Uganda Consolidated Proportions Limited, a subsidiary of the government-owned Uganda Development Corporation (UDC). In 1996, she was promoted to accountant, at the same company, serving in that capacity until 1998. From 1998 until 2000, she served as the deputy speaker of Tororo District Council. She also served as an inspectorate officer in the office of the Inspector General of Government (IGG), from 1999 until 2003. From 2003 to 2004, she was promoted to senior inspectorate officer, in the IGG's office. From 2004 until 2006, she was promoted to principal inspectorate officer in the office of the IGG. During the same timeframe, she served as the deputy project coordinator of the DANIDA Anti-Corruption Project. From 2006 until 2007, she served as the Accountant of the Acholi Bursary Program, a project of the Royal Netherlands Embassy. From 2009 until 2010, she served as the finance manager at Windle Trust Uganda, an NGO. In 2011, she successfully contested the parliamentary seat of Women's Representative for Tororo District under the National Resistance Movement political party ticket. She was appointed minister of State for Lands, serving in that position from 2011 until 2012. In a cabinet reshuffle on 15 August 2012, Opendi was appointed minister of State for Primary Healthcare.

== 2016 political season ==
Sarah Achieng Opendi was the elected Member of Parliament for Tororo District Women's Representative until 2016. During the primaries of the ruling National Resistance Movement political party, in October 2015, Opendi lost 42,718 vs 44,444 to Jacinta Ayo.

During the general elections of February 2016, Opendi ran as an Independent. She was declared the winner with 61,800 votes vs 59,790 votes received by Jacinta Ayo. However, it was found out that two ballot boxes had broken seals and others had open spaces. This raised suspicions of evidence tampering and ballot stuffing. This was discovered at Tororo Court, and the Chief Magistrate's Court at Tororo District Headquarters ordered for vote recounting.

Ayo went to court and was able to prove that the returning officers altered the vote tally sheets at more than one polling station. In total, she was able to prove that a total of 1,765 votes had been taken away from her. The correct final tally, according to the evidence, was Ayo 61,276 vs Opendi 60,772. The High Court sitting at Mbale on 28 July 2016 ordered that Opendi be kicked out of Parliament and that fresh elections be held.

== 2026 political season ==
Opendi contested for the seat of Woman Member of Parliament for Tororo district, but lost. Ayo Jacinta won with 44,441 votes, to Opendi's 42,718 votes; Opendi lost by a margin of 1,723 votes.

== Other considerations ==
Opendi is single.

== See also ==
- Cabinet of Uganda
- Parliament of Uganda
- Government of Uganda
