= Sam Kavuma =

Ugandan general (born 1960)

Lieutenant General Sam Kavuma
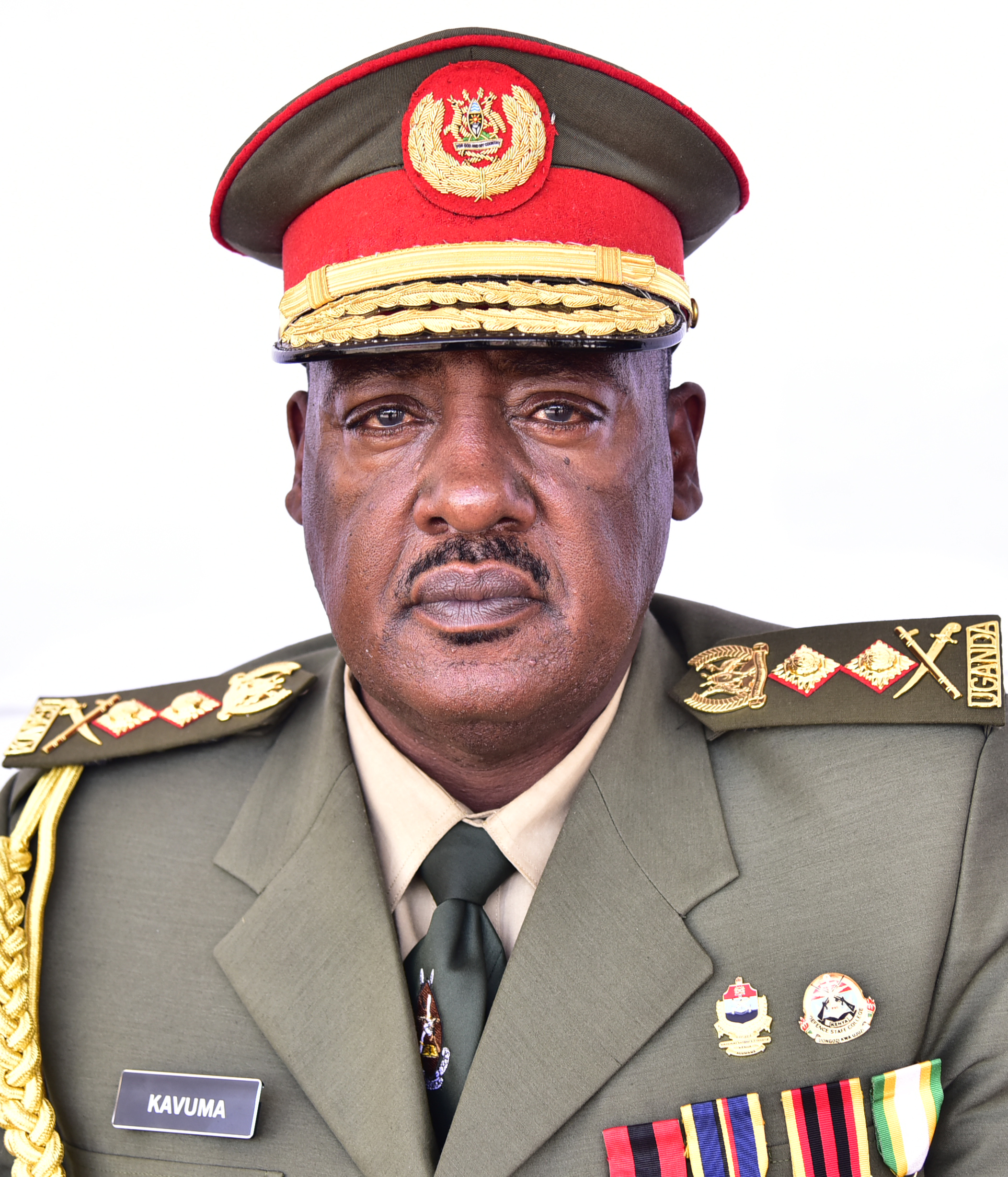
- Kavuma Sam in 2021
- Born: 1960 (age 65–66); Central Region, Uganda
- Citizenship: Uganda
- Education: National Defence College, Kenya (National Strategic Studies Course
- Occupation: Military Officer
- Years active: 1990 – present
- Known for: Military Matters

Lieutenant General Samuel Kavuma, commonly known as Sam Kavuma, is a Ugandan senior military officer. Since March 2024, he has been serving as the Commander of the African Union Transition Mission in Somalia (ATMIS). Before that, from 24 June 2021 until 24 March 2024, he was the deputy coordinator of Operation Wealth Creation, a presidential appointment by Yoweri Museveni Immediately before that position, he served as the deputy commander of the Uganda People's Defence Force Air Force. Before that, Kavuma served as the Commander of the Uganda People's Defence Force Contingent in Somalia, as part of the African Union Mission to Somalia (AMISOM). He was appointed to that position in October 2014. He replaced Brigadier General Dick Olum, who served in that position from September 2013 until October 2014.

== Background and education ==
Sam Kavuma was born in Central Uganda, circa 1960. He received military training from the National Defence College, Kenya, between July 2012 until June 2013.

== Military career ==
In 2011, at the rank of colonel, Sam Kavuma was the Commanding Officer of the Uganda People's Defence Force 5th Division, based in Pader, Northern Uganda. On 18 September 2011, he was promoted to the rank of brigadier. In July 2013, having recently graduated from the National Defence College, Kenya, Brigadier Kavuma was appointed as "Commander of the Regional Taskforce against the LRA in South Sudan and Central African Republic (CAR)", replacing Bigadier Dick Olum. In October 2014, Yoweri Museveni, the Commander in Chief of the Uganda People's Defence Force, appointed Brigadier Sam Kavuma, as overall Commander of their contingent to the African Union Mission to Somalia.

== Other considerations ==
At the rank of Major General, Samuel Kavuma served as the Chairman of Wazalendo Savings and Credit Cooperative Society, a savings and credit cooperative belonging to the members of the Ugandan military.

== See also ==
- Dick Olum
- David Muhoozi
- Leopold Kyanda
- Katumba Wamala
