= Richard Gafabusa =

Ugandan politician

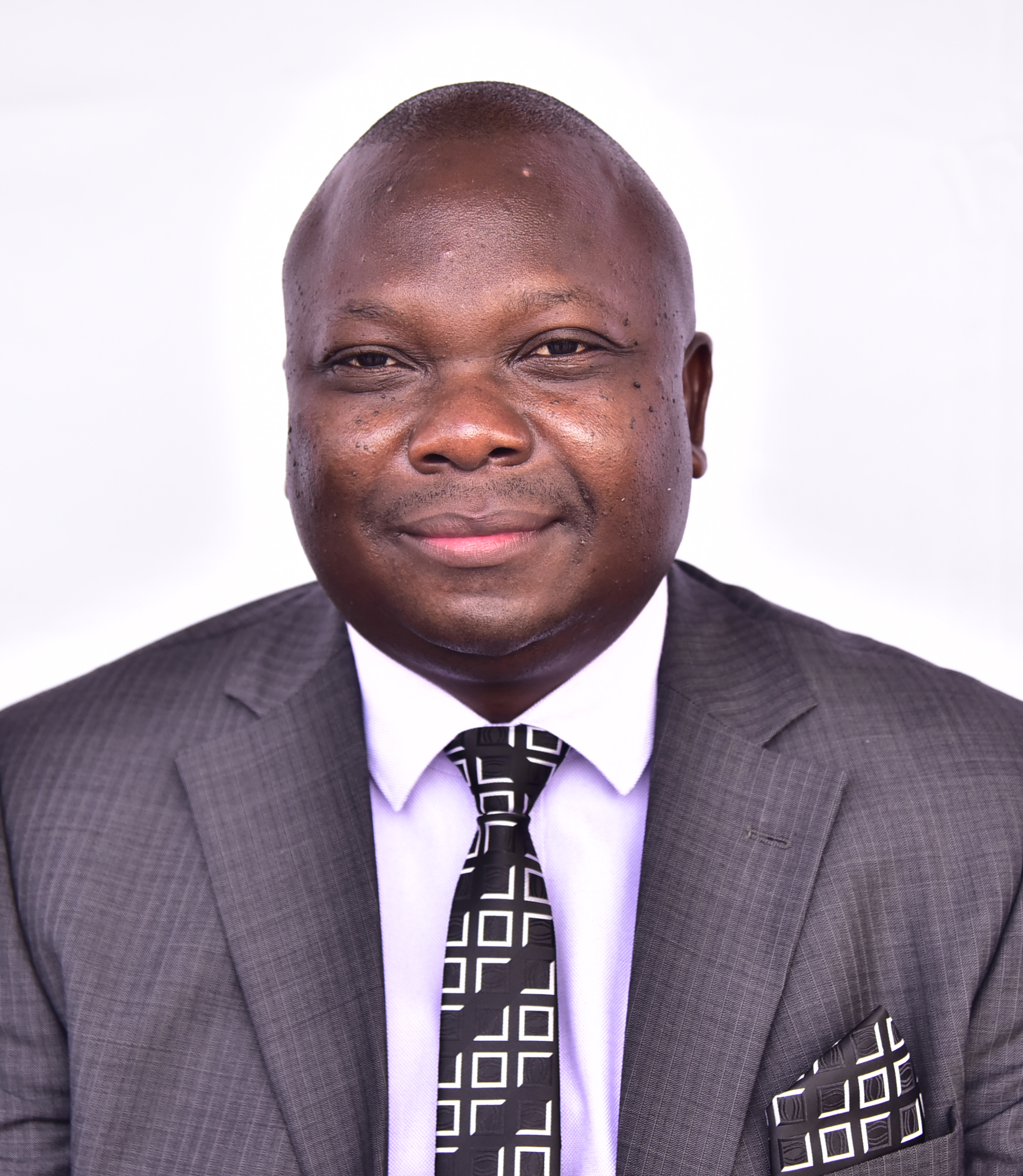
- Gafabusa Richard Muhumuza

Honorable

Personal details
- Born: Richard Gafabusa; 3 August 1977 (age 49) Bundibugyo, Uganda
- Education: Makerere University (BA Environmental Management); LDC, Kampala (Certificate in Administrative Law)
- Occupation: Environmentalist, politician
- Known for: Environmental management, politics

Richard Muhumuza Gafabusa (born 3 August 1977) is a Ugandan environmentalist, administrative lawyer and politician. He is the elected Member of Parliament for Bwamba County and a representative for NRM, the ruling political party in Uganda.

He is a member of the Committee on Science and Technology, the Committee on Legal and Parliamentary Affairs and the NRM Parliamentary Caucus in the 10th Parliament of Uganda. In 2021 he was re elected into parliament. In the eleventh parliament, Gafabusa serves on the Committee on Trade, Tourism and Industry.

Gafabusa is a former project officer for the International Union for Conservation of Nature (IUCN), SAGE (Social Assistance Grants for Empowerment) technical officer for the Ministry of Gender, Labour and Social Development (MGLSD), programme coordinator for ActionAid International Uganda (AAIU), partnership officer at GOAL Uganda and a former project officer for Self-care Rural Education Support Association (Self-Care).

== Early life and education ==
Gafabusa was born in Bwamba, Bundibugyo District on 3 August 1977 in an Anglican family of the Baamba. His father Fabiano Gafabusa was a peasant farmer and his mother Alice Butamanya, a clinical midwife specialist.

He had his primary education in his home district of Bundibugyo attending Mirambi Primary School, Bundibuga Primary School, Bubandi Primary School and finally Kisonko Primary School where he was a debate prefect and also from where he attained his PLE certification in 1992.

He then attended Semuliki High School, St. Mary's Simbya Senior Secondary School and Kihembo Hill Memorial College for his O-Level education and Nyakasura School for his A-Level education, attaining a UCE certification in 1996 and a UACE certification in 1999. He served as a head prefect at both St. Mary's Simbya Senior Secondary School and Nyakasura School and was also a house captain for Commander House in Nyakasura School.

Gafabusa further advanced to Makerere University where he served as an electoral commissioner for the Makerere University Geographical Society {MUGS} and graduated in 2004 with a Bachelor of Arts in Environmental Management. He then went to Law Development Centre, where he attained a postgraduate certificate in Administrative Law in the year 2009. Also, he acquired a postgraduate certificate in project planning and management from Makerere University and a certificate in sustainable land management from Rural Community in Development (RUCID) among other on job training certifications.

== Career ==
=== Beginnings ===
Gafabusa started his career as a teacher of English and Literature at St. Mary's Simbya Senior Secondary School in 2000, then at Bubandi Seed Secondary School and Kakuka Hill Senior Secondary School in 2003. On attaining his bachelor's degree, Gafabusa was employed as a project officer for Self-care Rural Education Support Association (Self-Care) in 2004 and then as a partnership officer for GOAL Uganda in 2005.

In 2006, he secured employment as a programme officer for ActionAid International Uganda (AAIU) where he was promoted to the role of a regional policy analyst in 2008 and eventually to that of a programme coordinator in 2009. In 2012, he worked as a SAGE technical officer in the Ministry of Gender, Labour and Social Development and also as a project officer for the International Union for Conservation of Nature (IUCN) up until 2015 when he resigned to join elective politics.

==== Political career ====
In 2015, Gafabusa joined elective politics on the NRM ticket, winning both the party's primaries and the 2016 general elections thereby becoming a member of the 10th Parliament for the Pearl of Africa representing Bwamba County in Bundibugyo District.

In the 10th Parliament, Gafabusa serves on the Committee on Science and Technology and the Committee on Legal and Parliamentary Affairs. He is also a member of the Uganda Parliamentary Forum for Children (UPFC), the Uganda Women's Parliamentary Association (UWOPA), the Parliamentary Forum for Climate Change (PFCC), the Uganda Parliamentary Forum on Youth Affairs (UPFYA), the Parliamentary Forum on Nutrition, the Uganda Parliamentary Prayer Breakfast Fellowship and the NRM Parliamentary Caucus.

== Personal details ==
Richard Gafabusa is married to Lillian Kyomugisa Gafabusa and they have four children: Lydia Katusabe Gafabusa, born 20 September 1996; Lloyd Businge Gafabusa, born 14 April 2002; Loice Akugizibwe Alice Gafabusa, born 1 August 2008 and; Lewis Asiimwe Gafabusa, born 31 December 2011. Gafabusa was the speaker of Obudhingiya Bwa Bwamba from 2012 to 2016.

== See also ==
- Bundibugyo District
- National Resistance Movement
- Parliament of Uganda
