= Tarsis Kabwegyere =

Ugandan politician

- Born: 26 April 1941 (age 85); Uganda
- Citizenship: Uganda
- Education: Makerere University (BA in sociology) (MA in political sociology) (PhD in sociology)
- Occupations: Academic and politician
- Years active: 1979–present
- Known for: Politics
- Title: Professor
- Successor: Justine Lumumba Kasule

Tarsis Bazana Kabwegyere is a Ugandan sociologist, academic and politician. He is a former minister of general duties in the Ugandan cabinet. He was appointed to that position on 23 May 2013. From 15 August 2012 until 23 May 2013, he was the minister of gender, labour and social affairs. At first, the parliamentary committee vetting cabinet appointments rejected his selection, but after discussions between President Yoweri Museveni and Speaker Rebecca Kadaga, he was finally approved on 7 September 2012. Earlier, he was the minister of disaster relief and planning in the Ugandan cabinet, from 1 June 2006 until 27 May 2011. In the cabinet reshuffle of 27 May 2011, he was dropped from the cabinet and replaced by Stephen Mallinga. He was also the elected member of parliament representing Igara County West, Bushenyi District, from 1996 until 2011.

== Background and education ==
He was born in Bushenyi District on 26 April 1941. He has the degree of Bachelor of Arts in sociology. His Master of Arts degree is in political sociology. He also has a degree of Doctor of Philosophy in the same field. All his academic degrees were awarded by Makerere University, Uganda's oldest and largest public university, founded in 1922.

After Idi Amin's seizure of power in Uganda in 1971, Kabwegyere joined the Save Uganda Movement, a militant group attempting to overthrow Amin.

== Career ==
Following the fall of the Amin's regime in 1979, Kabwegyere was appointed minister of lands and natural resources, having that position until 1980. From 1982 until 1987, he was the head of the Department of Sociology in the Faculty of Social Sciences at Makerere University. Following the removal of Milton Obote from power and the overthrow of the military junta of Tito Okello, Kabwegyere became a member of the National Resistance Council, the parliamentary body in Uganda from 1986 until 1996.

He was also served the state minister for foreign affairs from 1987 until 1991. Between 1991 and 1996, he was the director of external relations at the National Resistance Movement Secretariat. He was appointed to the Disaster Relief Ministry in June 2006, until he was dropped from the cabinet in May 2011.

In September 2006, Kabwegyere participated in a political forum held during the Ugandan North American Association (UNAA) convention in New York City.

He continuously represented Igara County West, Bushenyi District in the Uganda Parliament from 1996 until 2011. In 2010, he was defeated during the primary elections by Raphael Magezi, also of the National Resistance Movement political party, the incumbent member of parliament.

== Personal details ==
Kabwegyere is married. He belongs to the National Resistance Movement political party. He is reported to enjoy playing lawn tennis and participating in debates.

== See also ==
- Parliament of Uganda
- Cabinet of Uganda
- Bushenyi District
