= Geofrey Arinaitwe =

- Education: Makerere University; Katholieke Universiteit Leuven
- Occupations: Agricultural and biotechnology researcher
- Employer: National Agricultural Research Organisation
- Organization: National Coffee Research Institute
- Known for: Agricultural biotechnology research
- Title: Director of Research

Geofrey Arinaitwe also known as Arinaitwe Geoffrey is a Ugandan agricultural and biotechnology researcher and Director of Research at the National Coffee Research Institute (NaCORI), under the National Agricultural Research Organisation (NARO).

== Education ==
Arinaitwe holds a bachelor's degree in agriculture and a master's degree in biotechnology from Makerere University. He also holds a PhD in Bioscience Engineering from Katholieke Universiteit Leuven (KU Leuven), Belgium.

== Career ==
Arinaitwe began his career in agricultural research at National Agricultural Research Laboratories (NARL), Kawanda, where he served as a senior biotechnology scientist. He also served as a Senior Scientist and Team Leader for NARO's Banana Biofortification Project.

He later served as a Programme Leader for the National Biotechnology and Biodiversity Programme. In 2019, Arinaitwe was appointed to serve as Director of Research of NaCORI.

In addition, Arinaitwe is a co-founder of BioCrops Uganda Limited, a biotechnology company involved in producing certified planting materials.

== Achievements ==
Geofrey Arinaitwe and his BioCrops Uganda team was the winner of the fourth round of the LINK (Learning and Innovation Network for Knowledge and Solutions) programme.

== See also ==
- Tress Bucyanayandi
- Zerubabel Nyiira
- Frank Tumwebaze
- Ministry of Agriculture, Animal Industry and Fisheries
