= NHC =

NHC may refer to:

== Organisations ==
=== China ===
- National Health Commission
- Nantong Haimen Codion F.C., an association football club

=== United Kingdom ===
- National Hamster Council, an organization
- North Hertfordshire College, Hertfordshire, England

=== United States ===
- National Humanities Center, in North Carolina
- National Hurricane Center
- Naval Historical Center
- National Health Council
- Natural Health Center, Portland, Oregon
- National Housing Conference, Washington, D.C.
- National Hockey Center, St. Cloud, Minnesota
- New Hampshire College (disambiguation)
- North Harris College, now Lone Star College-North Harris

=== Elsewhere ===
- Nsambya Home Care, of Nsambya Hospital, Uganda

== Places ==
- New Hanover County, a county in North Carolina, US
- New Haven County, a county in Connecticut, US

== Other uses ==
- N-Heterocyclic carbene, a persistent carbene, commonly used as ligand in organometallic chemistry
- Nag Hammadi Codex, or Nag Hammadi Codices
- NHC band, formed by Dave Navarro, Taylor Hawkins and Chris Chaney
