= Emmanuel Iyamulemye =

Ugandan agricultural scientist and corporate executive

- Born: c. 1971 (age 54–55); Uganda
- Died: 18th November 2025; Kampala, Uganda
- Education: Wageningen University; Uganda Martyrs University
- Occupations: Agricultural scientist; corporate executive
- Years active: 2008–2025
- Title: Managing director of Uganda Coffee Development Authority

Emmanuel Iyamulemye Niyibigira, commonly known as Emmanuel Iyamulemye, was a Ugandan agricultural scientist, businessman and corporate executive, who was the managing director of the Uganda Coffee Development Authority (UCDA). On 17 November 2021, the UCDA board of directors appointed him to a second five-year term until UCDA was removed by the Government of Uganda.

== Background and education ==
Iyamulemye was an Ugandan by birth. He held an undergraduate degree in agricultural science, from an undisclosed university. His master's degree in Crop Science was awarded by Wageningen University, in the Netherlands. He went on to obtain a Doctor of Philosophy degree in Agricultural Science from the same university. His degree of Master of Business Administration was awarded by Uganda Martyrs University.

== Career ==
As of November 2021, Iyamulemye's career and work experience stretched back in excess of 15 years. For two years, after graduate school, he was the program director of a program promoting NERICA rice in Uganda, with support from the Food and Agriculture Organization.

He then spent several years as the national program coordinator for two development programs, jointly founded by the European Union and Government of Uganda to uplift living conditions in the Northern Region of Uganda. The Northern Uganda Agricultural Livelihoods Recovery Program (ALREP), worth €20 million, and the Karamoja Livelihoods Program (KALIP), worth €15 million, ran between 2010 and 2016.

Iyamulemye was first appointed as CEO of UCDA in 2016. In 2021, the UCDA Board renewed his contract for another five years, based on the positive outcome of his first term.

== Personal life ==
Iyamulemye was married to Bridget and had four children.

== Death ==
Iyamulemye's death was confirmed by Frank Tumwebaze on his X account, on the morning of November 18, 2025.

== See also ==
- Ministry of Agriculture, Animal Industry and Fisheries (Uganda)
