= Jolly Twebaze Ngabirano =

Ugandan entrepreneur (1961–2018)

- Born: 21 May 1961; Nyakiju village, Buyanja sub-county, Rukungiri District, Uganda
- Died: 2018; Germany
- Education: Bachelor's degree, Makerere University

Jolly Twebaze Ngabirano (21 May 1961 - 8 February 2018) was a Ugandan entrepreneur and founder of coffee shops under the name Cafe' PAP.

== Background and education ==
Ngabirano was born in a pastoral family to Gladys and Yeremiah Nyakairima on 21 May 1961 in Nyakiju village, Buyanja sub-county, Rukungiri District, Uganda. She was the eighth born in the family of ten children.

Ngabirano did her primary education at Nyakaina Primary School in Rukungiri District. She attended Maryhill High School for her secondary education and completed her bachelor's degree in 1985 from Makerere university.

She attended a one year course in public relations in Nairobi.

== Career ==
Ngabirano worked with the Coffee Marketing Board of Uganda Coffee Development Authority in 1987.

She also worked as Principal Revenue Officer at Uganda Revenue Authority where she held this position until 2003.

On 23 April 2004, Ngabirano founded Cafe' PAP at 13B Parliamentary Avenue. Cafe PAP expanded to open two more locations at Garden City shopping mall and Shell Bukoto after 14 years.

== Personal life ==
Ngabirano was married to Henry Ngabirano, the former managing director of Uganda Coffee Development Authority and they married in 1988.

== Death ==
She died in Germany in 2018 after being transferred for pancreatic cancer treatment.

== See also ==
- Aronda Nyakairima
