= Nsambya Hospital Cancer Center =

Private faith-based cancer treatment center in Uganda

- St. Francis Hospital Nsambya

Geography
- Location: Nsambya, Kampala, Buganda Region, Uganda
- Coordinates: 00°18′06″N 32°35′06″E

Organisation
- Care system: Private, Non-profit
- Type: Cancer Treatment, Research and Teaching
- Affiliated university: Uganda Martyrs University

Services
- Beds: 36

History
- Opened: May 2011; 14 years ago

Links
- Other links: List of hospitals in Uganda; Healthcare in Uganda

The Nsambya Hospital Cancer Center (NHCC), also Rotary–Centenary Bank Cancer Center, is a private, faith-based, specialized, tertiary care medical facility, under construction in Uganda. When completed as expected, the center will offer radiotherapy, chemotherapy, oncology pharmacy, cancer rehabilitation and undergraduate and postgraduate oncology medical and nursing education starting in 2027.

== Location ==
The centre is located within St. Francis Hospital Nsambya, situated on Nsambya Hill, approximately 4 kilometres (2 mi), southeast of the central business district of Kampala, Uganda's capital city.

== Overview ==
NHCC is an oncology diagnostic and treatment unit within Nsambya Hospital, a private, Catholic faith-based tertiary care, teaching hospital with bed capacity in excess of 540, as of August 2024. The centre began as a department of the hospital offering gynecological screening for cervical cancer in 2009. In 2010 services were expanded to include surgical screening for breast cancer. In May 2011, an oncologist was hired and comprehensive oncology services were established. Services include laboratory, pharmacy, chemotherapy, and oncology rehabilitative services. Up to 2027, when radiotherapy services are expected to start, patients who need radiation therapy have to travel to foreign locations (Kenya, South Africa, India and Europe) to receive those services, or seek the services of Uganda Cancer Institute in Mulago, which is congested and overcrowded.

== Background ==
Uganda is an East African country, with a population of about 45.9 million as of the 2024 national housing census. The most prevalent cancers in Uganda as of 2022 were for women: (1) Cervical cancer (2) Breast cancer (3) Stomach cancer (4) Esophageal cancer and (5) Liver cancer. At the same time, the leading cancers in men in Uganda were (1) Prostate cancer (2) Kaposi's sarcoma (3) Liver cancer and (4) Lymphoma.

NHCC was established in 2011, to complement and relieve the Uganda Cancer Institute. It is also intended to reduce the increasing number of private patients in Uganda seeking oncology services in overseas locations. In 2021, NHCC began constructing underground bunkers to house two linear accelerator machines so that the center can start offering radiotherapy services. The construction of the bunkers is budgeted at USh4 billion (approx. US$1.1 million in 2024).

In 2012, Nsambya Hospital, with financial support from the Rotary Club of Kampala, Centenary Bank, Crown Beverages and other donors, began the construction of the 36-bed, dedicated oncology center at a cost of Sh1.5 billion (approx. US$500,000 in 2015). The completed dedicated unit was handed over to the hospital in July 2015.

== Staff ==
As of 2024, NHCC employed various staff members, including nurses, physicians, therapists, reproductive health specialists, nutritionists, auxiliary support staff, palliative care nurses, gynecology oncologists, medical oncologists and surgical oncologists.

== Collaboration ==
Nsambya Hospital collaborates with a number of local, national, regional and international entities to raise funds for construction of infrastructure, raise funds for laboratory equipment, supplies and oncology medications. Some of the leading collaborators include The Rotary Club, Centenary Bank, Uganda Cancer Institute, AISPO, Oncology for Africa, Yashoda Hospitals, Apollo Hospitals Enterprise Limited and Cytecare Cancer Hospitals.

== See also ==
- List of hospitals in Uganda
