= National Agricultural Research Organisation =

Statutory body in Uganda

Agency overview
- Formed: 2005 (age 20–21)
- Jurisdiction: Government of Uganda
- Headquarters: Plot 11–13 Lugard Avenue, Entebbe, Uganda; 0°03′36.0″N 32°27′00.0″E
- Minister responsible: Frank Tumwebaze, Ministry of Agriculture, Animal Industry and Fisheries (Uganda)
- Agency executive: Dr. Yona Baguma, Director General
- Parent agency: Ministry of Agriculture, Animal Industry and Fisheries (Uganda)
- Website: naro.go.ug

The National Agricultural Research Organisation (NARO) is a statutory body in Uganda responsible for coordinating, overseeing, and guiding public agricultural research. It was established under the National Agricultural Research Act of 2005. and operates under the supervision of the Ministry of Agriculture, Animal Industry and Fisheries (Uganda), headed by Frank Tumwebaze. NARO’s mandate includes generating and disseminating agricultural technologies, innovations, and knowledge to support sustainable agricultural development across Uganda.

== Location ==
The headquarters of the National Agricultural Research Organisation are located at Plot 11–13 Lugard Avenue in Entebbe, Uganda, along the northern shores of Lake Victoria. Entebbe is situated approximately 40 kilometers south of Kampala, Uganda’s capital and largest city.

The geographical coordinates of the NARO headquarters are 0°03′36.0″N 32°27′00.0″E.

== Overview ==
The organisation was created by the National Agricultural Research Act of 2005 as part of a reform under the National Agricultural Research System (NARS), intended to improve efficiency and innovation in agriculture. It became operational in 2006 and serves as the apex body guiding agricultural research policy, implementation, and collaboration across Uganda.

== Governance ==
NARO is governed by a Governing Council, which provides strategic oversight and policy direction. The Council comprises representatives from government ministries, academia, civil society, the private sector, and farmer organizations. The Director General serves as the chief executive officer and is appointed by the Council.

As of 2025, the Director General is Dr. Yona Baguma. He is supported by a senior leadership team that includes:

- Dr. Swidiq Mugerwa – Deputy Director General, Research Coordination
- Dr. Sadik Kassim – Deputy Director General, Agricultural Technology Promotion
- Dr. Kisaka Stevens – Director, Corporate Services
- Mr. Dennis Owor – Director, Internal Audit
- Mr. Mark Sseremba – Director, Human Resource
- Mr. Julius Tegiike Mununuzi – Director, Finance

NARO employs approximately 735 staff across its headquarters and 16 public agricultural research institutes as of 2025

== Mandate ==
The National Agricultural Research Organisation (NARO) is mandated to coordinate, oversee, and guide agricultural research in Uganda. It was established under the National Agricultural Research Act of 2005 to generate and disseminate appropriate, safe, and cost-effective technologies for farmers.

== Governance ==
NARO operates under the Ministry of Agriculture, Animal Industry and Fisheries (MAAIF). Its governance structure includes a Council, Secretariat, and specialized research institutes that address different aspects of agriculture, livestock, and fisheries.

== Research and innovations ==
NARO has played a key role in developing new crop varieties and climate-resilient agricultural technologies to support food security and productivity in Uganda.

== Outreach and communications ==
In August 2025, NARO organized a training workshop for journalists from Western Uganda—including the Ankole, Kigezi, Rwenzori, and Tooro sub-regions—to enhance reporting accuracy on agricultural research, innovations, and technologies. The training aimed to strengthen public understanding and uptake of NARO’s research outputs.

== See also ==
- Agriculture in Uganda
- Parliament of Uganda
- Frank Tumwebaze
