= Paul D'Arbela =

Ugandan physician

Professor Paul D'Arbela FRCP
- Born: 4 July 1934 (age 92); Buikwe District, Uganda
- Education: Makerere University; Royal College of Physicians
- Occupations: Physician; Cardiologist; Researcher; Academic
- Years active: 1970–present
- Known for: Medical practice and research
- Title: Professor of medicine and dean of postgraduate studies, Uganda Martyrs University School of Medicine

Paul George D'Arbela is a Ugandan physician, cardiologist, academic, and medical researcher. According to a 2008 published report, he is a professor of medicine and the dean of postgraduate studies at the Mother Kevin Postgraduate Medical School, based at St. Francis Hospital Nsambya in Nsambya, a neighborhood in Kampala.

== Education ==
D'Arbela was educated at Namilyango Junior School from P1 to P4. He attended St. Peter's School Nsambya for P5. He transferred to Nkokonjeru Primary School in the middle of P5. The following year, he was moved to Jinja, where he skipped P6. He attended P7 and P8 at Jinja College.

In 1951, he was admitted to St. Mary's College Kisubi, for his secondary school education, from S1 to S6. While at Kisubi, he resided in Lourdel Hall. From Kisubi, he entered Makerere University Medical School to study medicine in 1957. He graduated with a Bachelor of Medicine and Bachelor of Surgery degree in 1962.

He later went to London, England, for further studies at the Royal Postgraduate Medical School and at Hammersmith Hospital. While there, he became a Member of the Royal College of Physicians of the United Kingdom, specializing in cardiology. Later, he was elected a Fellow of the Royal College of Physicians.

== Work experience ==
D'Arbela was a lecturer and later a senior lecturer in the Faculty of Medicine at Makerere University, from the late 1960s until 1978, serving as Head of department for most of that period. During the same timeframe he worked as a Consultant Cardiologist and later as a Senior Consultant Cardiologist at Mulago National Referral Hospital, the teaching hospital of Makerere University. After leaving Makerere, D'Arbela started private practice, as well as consulting services at Lubaga Hospital. In 1982, he left Uganda for a sabbatical at his alma mater in London, United Kingdom.

When he left the United Kingdom, he accepted a job offer in Saudi Arabia, where he worked until 2006, when he returned to Uganda. He has served as the director of the Heart Center Limited, a specialised cardiology clinic in Nakasero, Kampala, since his return to Uganda. He has published the finding of his research in numerous medical journals and other peer publications. He was appointed professor of medicine and dean of postgraduate studies at the Uganda Martyrs University School of Medicine in 2010.

== Family ==
On 14 November 1970, Paul D'Arbela married Maria Vera Kangoggo Samali Muliira (1946 - 2019), a social worker with whom he fathered seven children.
