= Nsambya Hospital =

Private faith-based community, teaching hospital in Uganda

St. Francis Hospital Nsambya
- Little Sisters of St. Francis
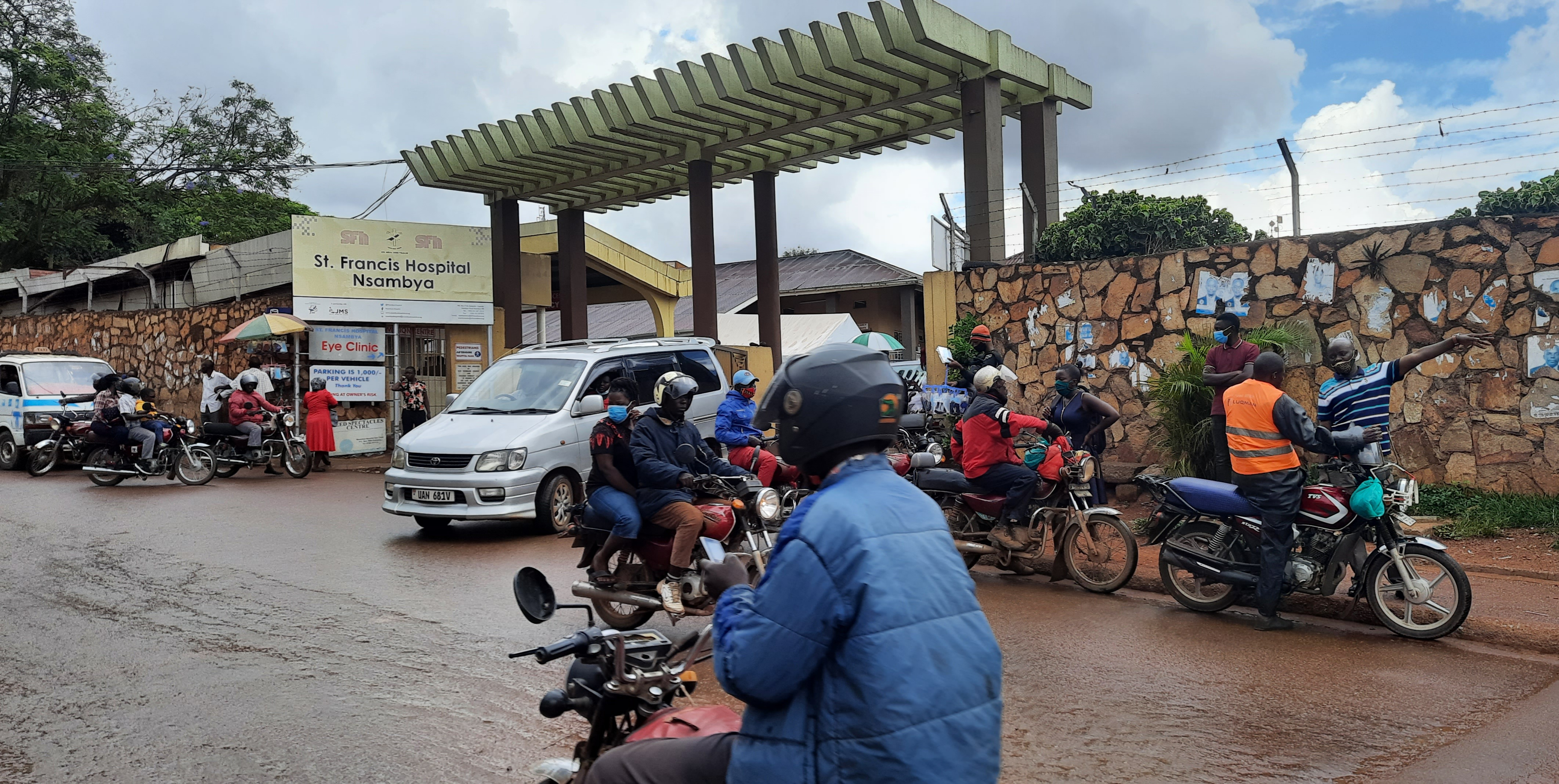
- Entrance to Nsambya Hospital

Geography
- Location: Nsambya, Kampala, Central Region, Uganda
- Coordinates: 00°18′06″N 32°35′06″E

Organisation
- Care system: Private, Non-profit
- Type: General and Teaching
- Affiliated university: Uganda Martyrs University

Services
- Emergency department: I
- Beds: 540+

History
- Founded: 1903

Links
- Other links: Hospitals in Uganda; Medical education in Uganda

St. Francis Hospital Nsambya, commonly known as Nsambya Hospital, is a hospital in Kampala, the capital of Uganda and the largest city in that country.

== Location ==
Nsambya Hospital is located 2.7 km from Kampala Central Business District off Ggaba Road along Hanlon and Kevina Roads on Nsambya Hill in Makindye Division, one of the five administrative divisions of the city, under the Kampala Capital City Authority.

== History ==
History of Nsambya Hospital St. Francis Hospital started as a dispensary in 1903 by Mother Mary Kevin Kearney, it became a hospital in 1906. For the first two decades it depended on part time doctors until 1922 when it got its first Resident Dr. Evelyn Connolly a lay volunteer who later joined the congregation of the Franciscan Sisters under the name Sister Assumpta. Sr. Assumpta died at Nsambya Hospital in 1974 and was instrumental in starting the Nursing School at Nsambya Hospital in 1935 which until 1963 together with Mulago and Mengo were the only schools training State Registered Nurses. Nsambya Hospital was the cradle for the Uganda Catholic Nurses Guild that was founded in 1945.

Following the launching of the Royal Commission of Medical Services in Uganda (The Fraser Commission of 1954), Nsambya Hospital was gazetted by the Government of Uganda for the first time and this led to a partnership that has lasted to the present day.

Sr. Assumpta was joined by Sister O’Sullivan, Sister Cotter an Internal Medicine specialist in 1967 and Sister Duggan an Obstetrician and Gynecologist, each one in succession becoming Medical Superintendent of the hospital. In 1977 Nsambya Hospital took lead as the first Non-Governmental Hospital to train Medical Intern doctors along with Mulago, Jinja and Mbale Hospitals.

The hospital's first Board of Governors was appointed in 1975 and in 1981 it made the recommendation to Archbishop Nsubuga for the hospital to open up to indigenous lay professionals in the wake of the expulsion of foreigners by the Idi Amin Government. In 1992 Sister Duggan the last Franciscan Missionary Sisters of Africa Medical Superintendent handed over management of the hospital to Dr. Paul Kizza and Obstetrician and Gynecologist.

== Overview ==
The hospital is currently owned by Kampala Archdiocese and is accredited by the Uganda Catholic Medical Bureau. It operates as a large Private Not-For-Profit hospital which in the National Health System is ranked at the level of a Regional Referral Hospital. The hospital has a bed capacity of 440. The scope of clinical care includes public health, outpatient and in-patient services, emergency and critical care services reaching about 500,000 people per year within Makindye Division and beyond.

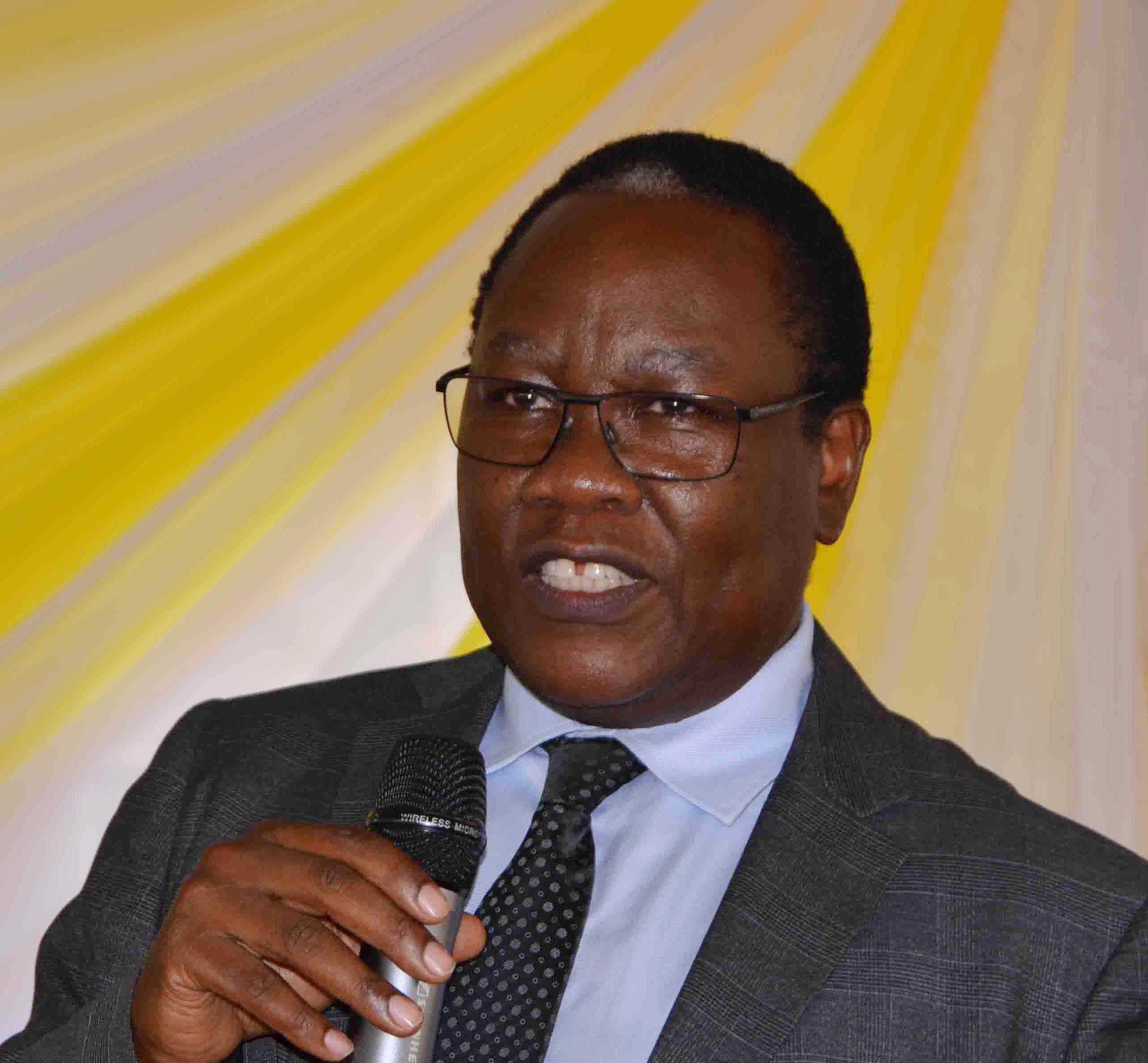
Prof. Fred Ssengooba (Nsambya Hospital)

The hospital is affiliated to Nsambya Hospital Training School that offers certificate and diploma courses for healthcare workers in nursing and laboratory techniques. Nsambya Hospital is the official training site for the postgraduate medical school of the Uganda Martyrs University and also a College of Surgeons of East, Central and Southern Africa (COSECSA) accredited training Hospital.

The Hospital Board of Governors provides the strategic vision and direction of the hospital on behalf of the Trustees of Kampala Archdiocese within the framework of the Hospital Charter. The Board is the governing body of the hospital and guides the long-term goals and policies by making strategic plans and decisions. The Board appoints the CEO and Senior Management who are charged with executing the hospital's strategy on a day-to-day basis.

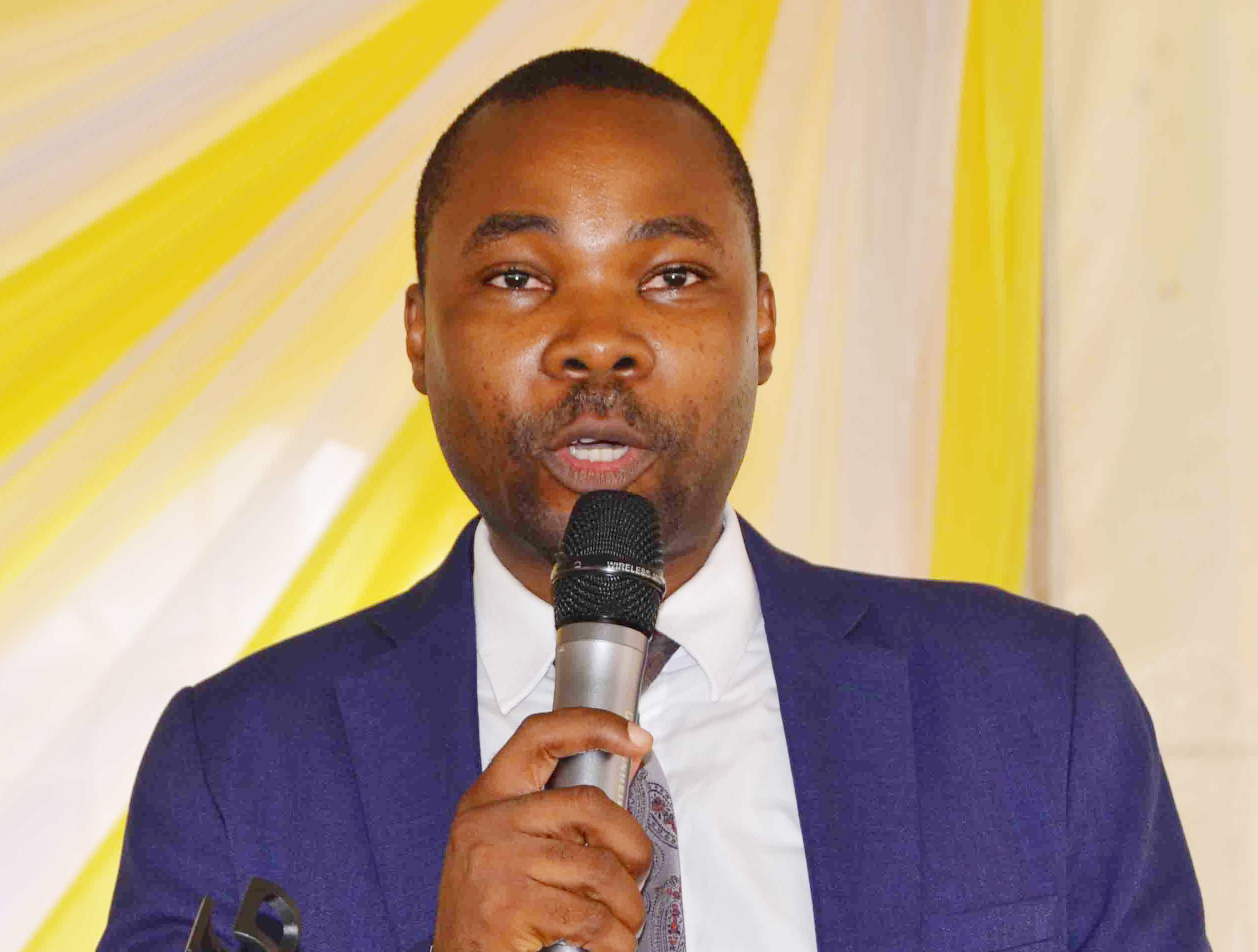
Dr. Andrew Ssekitooleko (Nsambya Hospital)

== Partnership with Uganda Martyrs University ==
In April 2010, Uganda Martyrs University (UMU), signed an agreement with Nsambya Hospital to establish a postgraduate medical school, based at the hospital. The school, Uganda Martyrs University School of Medicine (UMUSM), offers the postgraduate degree of Master of Medicine (MMed) in the disciplines of General Surgery, Obstetrics & Gynecology, Internal Medicine and Pediatrics. The first intake of students enrolled in the fall of 2010. Professor Paul D'Arbela, was appointed to serve as Professor of Medicine & Interim Dean of the Uganda Martyrs University Post Graduate Medical Education Programme. The hospital has a Quiet Garden, affiliated to The Quiet Garden Trust, used as a place of stillness, contemplation and prayer by doctors, nurses and patients.

== Cancer center ==
In July 2015, the hospital acquired the Rotary-Centenary Bank Cancer Center. The 36-bed facility was built at a cost of USh1.5 billion (approximately US$500,000), including donations by Centenary Bank and the Rotary Club of Kampala.

== See also ==
- KCCA
- Central Kampala
- Uganda Medical Schools
- Makindye Division
- Nsambya Home Care
- Teresa Kearney
