= Jinja College =

Coordinates: 0.44525°N 33.21340°E

- Jinja, Eastern Uganda; Uganda

Information
- Type: Public Middle School and High School (8-13)
- Motto: Strive to Excel
- Established: 1946; 80 years ago
- Enrollment: 1,050
- Athletics: soccer, track, tennis, Darts, volleyball, basketball, chess and table tennis
- Nickname: JICO
- Website: jinjacollege.sc.ug

Jinja College is a government-funded boys' boarding school, a school of O and A levels, in Jinja, Uganda.

== History ==
The school was founded in 1946 as a junior school by the Mill Hill Missionary fathers, when the administration decided to transfer the institution to a site with easy access to social amenities. They moved to occupy the premises which had been vacated by the Franciscan Sisters. Fr. Mc Gough became the first head teacher of the new institution now named Jinja College. Initially, a private junior school (S.1 to S.3) became a government-aided school and upgraded to secondary status (S.1 to S.4) in 1965 with Fr. Jone Jones as its head teacher. In 1981, the school was upgraded again to A’ Level status (S.1–S.6), offering Arts and Science courses (subjects) with Mr. Boniface Kategano as the head teacher.

The following have ever headed the school Mr. Ogutti Bichachi (1984-1996), Ag. Head teacher Mr. Oryema Anthony (1996) Mr. Iisat Ignatius (1997-2001), Mr. Kawuki Joseph (2001-2013) and Mr. Isabirye Mathias (2013 to 2024) and Mr. Dhikusooka Micheal (2024 to date).

== Administration ==
Jinja college is run according to an established administrative structure in the hierarchy below; Ministry of Education and Sports, the board of governors, head teacher, deputy head teacher, staff, students' leadership and students

== Location ==
District : Jinja County : Jinja Municipal Council Sub-County : Kimaka – Mpumudde Parish : Rubaga Distance from Jinja town centre: 1 kilometers.

== Curriculum ==
The following are 16 subjects offered at O level (S.1 – S.4) 1. Mathematics * 9. English language* 2. Literature in English 3. Physics* 11. Chemistry * 4. Biology* 12. Agriculture 5. Technical drawing 13. History* 6. Geography* 14. Fine art 7. Christian religious education 15. Entrepreneurship 8. Information and communications Technology 16. Physical education At A level (S.5& S.6) the school offers the following subjects; Sciences 1.Mathematics 2. Physics 3. Chemistry 4. Biology 5. Agriculture 6. Technical drawing Arts 7. Literature in English 8. History 9. Geography 10. Christian religious 11. Entrepreneurship 12. Art and Design 13. Economics 14. General paper

A combination of four subjects plus a General paper is selected by the student from the above subjects depending on the student's ability and desired career.

== Academic trends ==
Despite challenges/shortcomings, there has been consistency in academic performance for the last ten years. The school is pursuing its academic targets with precision. Its target is that no student fails to go to the next level. The school has employed a multidimensional approach involving strengthening all academic departments, intensifying monitoring and evaluation of the implementation of academic programs, increasing and improving counseling services, building and maintaining physical infrastructures, improving management systems, improving and maintaining good discipline among others.

== Notable alumni ==
- Paul D'Arbela: Consultant cardiologist. Emeritus Professor of Medicine at Makerere University School of Medicine.
- Moses Hassim Magogo: Electrical engineer and politician. President of Federation of Uganda Football Associations (FUFA) and MP for Budiope East in Buyende District.
- Frank Tumwebaze: Ugandan Minister of Agriculture, Fisheries and Animal Resources
- Denis Nyangweso: Ugandan politician. MP for Samia-Bugwe Central, in Busia District
