= Denis Nyangweso =

Ugandan politician

Member of Parliament of Uganda from Samia-Bugwe Central
- Incumbent
- Assumed office 2021
- Preceded by: Office created

Personal details
- Born: September 28, 1978 (age 48)
- Party: Independent
- Other political affiliations: National Resistance Movement (NRM)
- Education: Makerere University

Denis Nyangweso (born September 28, 1978) is a Ugandan politician and member of the parliament representing Samia-Bugwe Central.

In the eleventh parliament, Nyangweso serves on the Committee on Public Service and Local Government.

== Early life and education ==
Nyangweso was born to Augustine and Cissy Juma as the second child in the family. He attended Busikho Primary School in Busia District for his First School Leaving Certificate before enrolling in Jinja College and later transferred to Greenville High School where he completed his O’Level. He earned a Bachelor of Arts in Social Sciences in 2003 and Master of Arts in Public Administration and Management (Human Resource Option) from Makerere University. After graduation, he was appointed Personnel Officer/Human Resource Officer in the Ministry of Public Service and deployed to police headquarters where served until 2009, when he was promoted and redeployed to the Ministry of Gender Labour and Social Development. In 2013, he was transferred from Ministry of Gender Labour and Social Development to Health Service Commission where he quit his public service career to join politics.

== Political career ==
Nyangweso first ran for an elective office in 2016 when he contested for Samia-Bugwe South seat in the parliament but lost to incumbent Julius Maganda Wandera. Following the creation of Samia-Bugwe Central constituency, he ran for the ticket of National Resistance Movement polling 8,849 votes but lost by a wide margin to Richard Wanyama Hamala who received 14,423 votes. Nyangweso went into the 2021 election as an independent candidate and won with 13,919 votes to beat Richard Wanyama of NRM who polled 11,312 votes. Nyangweso is the pioneer MP to occupy Samia-Bugwe Central seat in the 11th parliament.
