= Uganda Martyrs University School of Medicine =

Medical school in Uganda

Coordinates: 00°18′06″N 32°35′07″E

- Type: Private
- Established: 2010
- Affiliations: Uganda Martyrs University
- Dean: Professor Paul D'Arbela
- Location: Nsambya, Kampala, Uganda
- Campus: Urban

Uganda Martyrs University School of Medicine, whose official name is Mother Kevin Postgraduate Medical School, is the school of medicine of Uganda Martyrs University. As of June 2014, the medical school is the newest medical school in Uganda, having been established in 2010. Currently the school provides postgraduate medical education in the disciplines of Pediatrics, Internal Medicine, Surgery, Obstetrics/Gynecology and Emergency Medicine.

== Location ==
The school's campus is located on Nsambya Hill, in southern Kampala, Uganda's capital and largest metropolis, approximately 5 kilometres (3.1 mi), south of the central business district of the city. The school is housed on the premises of St. Francis Hospital Nsambya, a faith based not-for-profit hospital owned by the Roman Catholic Archdiocese of Kampala.

== Overview ==
UMU School of Medicine, the school of medicine of Uganda Martyrs University, was established in 2010. Its headquarters is in Nkozi, Mpigi District. The current dean is Professor Paul D'Arbela. The clinical teaching disciplines of the medical school are integrated with St. Francis Hospital Nsambya, a 540-bed community hospital owned by the Roman Catholic Archdiocese of Kampala and is administered by the Little Sisters of St. Francis.

== Departments ==
As of February 2015, the following departments constituted Uganda Martyrs University School of Medicine: 1. Department of Internal Medicine 2. Department of Obstetrics and Gynecology 3. Department of Pediatrics & Child Health 4. Department of Surgery and 5. Department of Emergency Medicine.

== Undergraduate courses ==
Currently there are no undergraduate courses offered at UMU School of Medicine.

== Graduate courses ==
The following postgraduate courses are offered at Uganda Martyrs University School of Medicine:

- Master of Medicine (MMed) - A clinical degree awarded following three years of instruction and examination in any of the following specialties: (a) Internal Medicine (b) Obstetrics and Gynecology (c) Pediatrics (d) Emergency Medicine and (e) Surgery.

== See also ==
- Education in Uganda
- Paul D'Arbela
- Charles Olweny
- Uganda Martyrs University
- List of universities in Uganda
- List of medical schools in Uganda
- List of hospitals in Uganda
