= Teresa Kearney =

Teacher and medical missionary, Catholic order foundress

Servant of God Mary Kevin Kearney
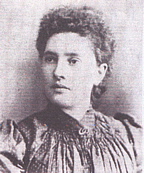
- Photograph of Teresa Kearney in early twentieth century

Personal details
- Born: Teresa Kearney; 28 April 1875 Knockenrahan, Arklow, Ireland
- Died: 17 October 1957 (aged 82) Brighton, Massachusetts, U.S.
- Occupation: Missionary; teacher

Mary Kevin Kearney (born Teresa Kearney; 28 April 1875 – 17 October 1957) was an Irish teacher, Franciscan Sister, and missionary, who founded the Franciscan Missionary Sisters for Africa in 1952. Born in Arklow, Ireland, she became an assistant mistress at 17 and taught in England. On 2 December 1902, she left to begin missionary work in Nsambya, Uganda, working as a Franciscan Sister of Saint Mary's Abbey, Mill Hill, London.

Kearney's work in East Africa resulted in the formation of multiple hospitals and training of nurses throughout the region. Her name serves as the root of the word Kevina, which means "hospital" or "charity institute" in Uganda. In 2016, the Roman Catholic Diocese of Lugazi opened her beatification process, securing her the title Servant of God.

== Early life ==
=== Family ===
Teresa Kearney was born in Knockenrahan, Arklow, County Wicklow, on 28 April 1875 as the third daughter of farmer Michael Kearney and Teresa Kearney. Three months prior to Kearney's birth, her father died in an accident. Following his death, Kearney's mother remarried and had three more children. When Kearney was ten years old, her mother died. Her maternal grandmother, Grannie Grenell, then raised Kearney in Curranstown, County Wicklow. Grannie Grenell had a profound impact on Kearny's spiritual beliefs and deep faith. When Kearney was 17, Grannie Grenell died.

=== Education ===
Kearney attended local convent school in Arklow following her mother's death. In 1889, following her grandmother's death, Kearney went to the Convent of Mercy at Rathdrum, County Wicklow to train as an assistant teacher. She did not have the finances to pay for training, and became a junior assistant mistress at 17.

== Career ==
=== Early work ===
Kearney went to teach in a school run by the Sisters of Charity in Essex, England.

=== Missionary work ===
Following the death of her grandmother, Kearney turned toward thoughts of religious life. She believed that God was calling her to be a sister, and she applied for admission to the Franciscan Missionary Sisters of the Five Wounds at Mill Hill, London. In 1895, Kearney entered St Mary's Abbey, Mill Hill. On 21 April 1898 she took the name Sister Mary Kevin of the Sacred Passion. Her motto was "For Thee, Lord". She volunteered to work with African Americans in London. She waited three years for a posting to the American mission, but when the call from a foreign mission came, it was from Africa.

==== Path to Uganda ====
On 3 December 1902, Kearney and five other sisters left London for Nsambya, Uganda Protectorate. They were chosen at the request of Bishop Henry Hanlon of the Mill Hill Fathers. The sisters arrived on 15 January 1903 and established a dispensary and school in the Buganda. "Their task was to care for the women and girls and to further weaken the association of Catholicism with French missionaries and Protestantism with British missionaries in the then British Protectorate." Among the sisters were three Irish, one American, one English, and one Scottish woman.

Kearney started her first clinic under a mango tree near the convent. The first seven years of missionary work were tough for the sisters. Various diseases, from smallpox to malaria, ravaged Buganda. The infant mortality rate was also relatively high due to the high frequency of maternal deaths. In 1906, Kearney expanded the missionary and set up a hospital in Nagalama, twenty-three miles away. Following Sister Paul's illness and return to the United States in 1910, Kearney was appointed the new superior of the convent. In 1913, three more sisters arrived, which allowed Kearney to establish a third mission station in Kamuli, Busoga. All three stations focused on medicine and education for the local population with a focus on primary and secondary education, training of nurses, and the founding of clinics, hospitals and orphanages.

==== Role in World War I ====
During World War I, the Nsambya Hospital was used to treat the Carrier Corps, who were porters for the fighting troops. At times, Kearney was outraged by the treatment Europeans gave to the African porters. She worked to uphold the rights of African people caught up in the European war. In the 1918 New Year Honours Kearney was awarded the MBE, Member of the Order of the British Empire.

==== Promotion of female education ====
Kearney is credited for promoting higher education in Catholic African women in her mission. In 1923, she founded the Little Sisters of St. Francis, a community of African nuns for teaching and nursing. This program started with only eight local girls. A year later, Kearney and Evelyn Connolly, a lay missionary, founded a nursing and midwifery school in Nsambya. Their goal was to promote the education of women throughout Uganda.

=== Creation of Franciscan Missionary Sisters for Africa ===
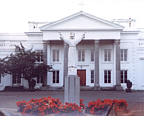
Mount Oliver, Dundalk motherhouse

In September 1928, Kearney returned to England to establish a novitiate exclusively for training sisters for African missions. The novitiate was officially opened in 1929 in Holme Hall, East Riding of Yorkshire. Many women from England, Scotland and Ireland travelled to Holme Hall to assist the missionary efforts. This created a shortage for the Mill Hill Fathers, who also needed sisters for their school in England and American missions. Upon realization of this divide, Kearney and the Mill Hill Fathers broke off from each other. On 9 June 1952 the new congregation of the Franciscan Missionary Sisters for Africa was founded by Kearney. Kearney was appointed the first superior-general. Mount Oliver, Dundalk, became the motherhouse for this new congregation. With the formation of the FMSA, Kearney expanded the missionary work to Uganda, Kenya, Zambia, the US, Scotland, and South Africa.

=== Retirement ===
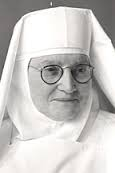
Photograph of Teresa Kearney in the mid-twentieth century

Kearney retired in 1955 at age 80. During retirement, she was appointed Superior of a convent in Boston, Mass. and raised funds for African projects. She travelled and talked to donors to garner support for projects in Africa.

== Death ==
On 17 October 1957, Kearney died at the age of 82 in Brighton, Massachusetts. Her remains were flown to Ireland and buried at Mount Oliver. Ugandan Catholics rallied to have her body flown to Uganda to be buried. On 3 December 1957, Kearney's body was buried in the cemetery at Nkokonjeru, the motherhouse of the Little Sisters of St. Francis.

=== Legacy ===
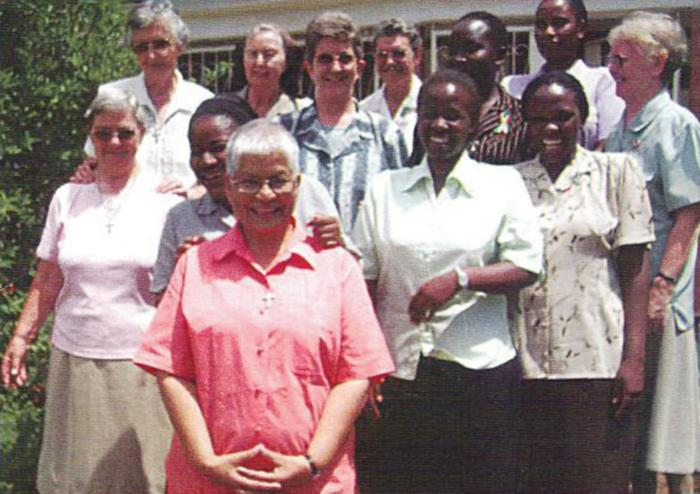
Photograph of current members of FMSA

Kearney's legacy is evident today. In Uganda, the word Kevina means "hospital" or "charitable institute". The Mother Kevin Postgraduate Medical School was named after Mother Kevin (Teresa Kearney). The Little Sisters of St. Francis currently has over 500 members throughout Africa, while the Franciscan Missionary Sisters for Africa currently works in Uganda, Kenya, Zambia, Zimbabwe, and South Africa.

On 6 November 2016, the Roman Catholic Diocese of Lugazi opened her formal beatification process, securing her the title Servant of God.

=== Awards ===
In 1918, Kearney was made Member of the Order of the British Empire (MBE) for her work during the war. In the 1955 Birthday Honours she received Commander of the Most Excellent Order of the British Empire (CBE). In 1955, she was also awarded the Pro Ecclesia et Pontifice by Pope Pius XI, for her work in Uganda. Posthumously she was given the Golden Jubilee Medal of Uganda in 2014.
