= Ministry of Agriculture, Animal Industry and Fisheries (Uganda) =

Government ministry of Uganda

- Coat of Arms of Uganda

Ministry overview
- Type: Ministry
- Jurisdiction: Government of Uganda
- Headquarters: Berkerly Lane, Entebbe, Uganda
- Ministry executive: Frank Tumwebaze, Minister of Agriculture, Animal Industry and Fisheries
- Website: Homepage

The Ministry of Agriculture, Animal Industry and Fisheries (MAAIF) is a cabinet-level ministry of the government of Uganda. The mandate of the ministry is to "formulate, review and implement national policies, plans, strategies, regulations and standards and enforce laws, regulations and standards along the value chain of crops, livestock and fisheries". The ministry is also responsible for the "enhancement of crop production and productivity, in a sustainable and environmentally safe manner, for improved food and nutrition security, employment, widened export base and improved incomes of the farmers".

The ministry is headed by a cabinet minister appointed by the president. Frank Tumwebaze is the Minister of Agriculture, Animal Industry and Fisheries.

== Location ==
The headquarters of MAAIF are located at Berkerly Lane in the city of Entebbe on the shores of Lake Victoria. The coordinate of the ministry headquarters are 0°03'27.0"N, 32°28'36.0"E (Latitude:0.057500; Longitude:32.476667).

== Departments ==
The ministry is organised into the following departments.

- Agricultural Planning
- Animal Production & Marketing
- Entomology
- Crop Production & Marketing
- Crop Inspection and Certification
- Crop Protection
- Farm Development
- Agricultural Infrastructure, Mechanization and Water for Agricultural Production
- Finance & Administration
- Fisheries Resources and Development
- Fisheries Regulation Control and Quality Assurance
- Aquacultuer Management and Development.
- Livestock Health & Entomology

== Affiliated agencies ==
In the execution of its mandate, the ministry collaborates closely with the following semi-autonomous government agencies:

1. Control of Trypanosomiasis in Uganda
2. Cotton Development Organisation
3. Dairy Development Authority
4. National Agricultural Advisory Services
5. National Agricultural Research Organisation
6. National Genetic Resource Centre and Databank
7. Plan For Modernisation of Agriculture Secretariat
8. Uganda Coffee Development Authority

== List of ministers ==
- Frank Tumwebaze (8 June 2021 - present)
- Vincent Ssempijja (6 June 2016 - 8 June 2021)
- Tress Bucyanayandi (27 May 2011 - 6 June 2016)
- Hope Mwesigye (16 February 2009 - 27 May 2011)
- Hillary Onek (1 June 2006 - 16 February 2009)
- Janat Mukwaya (12 January 2005 - 1 June 2006)
- Wilberforce Kisamba Mugerwa (c. 1999 - 2004)

== See also ==
- Parliament of Uganda
- Agriculture in Uganda
