= New Hampshire College =

New Hampshire College may refer to:

- New Hampshire College of Agriculture and the Mechanic Arts (1866–1923), now the University of New Hampshire
- Southern New Hampshire University, known as New Hampshire College from 1969 to 2001
