= Uganda Coffee Development Authority =

Government agency in Uganda

- UCDA

Agency overview
- Formed: 1991; 35 years ago
- Jurisdiction: Uganda
- Headquarters: Coffee House 35 Jinja Road Kampala
- Agency executive: Emmanuel Iyamulemye Niyibigira, Managing Director
- Parent agency: Uganda Ministry of Agriculture
- Website: Homepage

The Uganda Coffee Development Authority (UCDA) is a government agency mandated to "regulate, promote and oversee the quality of coffee along the entire value chain, support research and development, promote production, and improve the marketing of coffee in order to optimize foreign exchange earnings for the country and payments to the farmers.

== Location ==
The headquarters of the agency are located at Coffee House, Plot 35 Jinja Road, in the Central Business District of Kampala, the capital and largest city in the country. The coordinates of UCDA headquarters are:0°18'53.0"N, 32°35'28.0"E (Latitude:0.314735; Longitude:32.591106).

== About UCDA ==
Uganda Coffee Development Authority (UCDA) was established by an Act of Parliament 1991 and amended in 1994, Cap. 325 under the laws of the Republic of Uganda.

UCDA is established as a public Authority and its mandate is to promote and oversee the coffee industry by supporting research, promoting production, controlling the quality and improving the marketing of coffee in order to optimize foreign exchange earnings for the country and payments to the farmers. It is administered under the Uganda Ministry of Agriculture, Animal Industry and Fisheries.

=== Values of the Authority ===
UCDA believes in and continues to aspire for the following:

- Good governance. This takes into account high level of transparency, Accountability, Integrity, Respect for self and others;
- Provide value for stakeholders;
- Respect for the environment. Encouraging major stakeholders to produce coffee in a sustainable manner;
- Decentralization and working in harmony with the public and private sector in the execution of its services.

=== Objectives of the Authority ===
- To promote, improve and monitor the marketing of coffee with a view to optimizing foreign exchange earnings and payments to the farmers;
- To control the quality of coffee in order to ensure that all coffee exported meets the standards stipulated by the contract between the seller and the buyer;
- To develop and promote the coffee and other related industries through research and extension arrangements;
- To promote the marketing of coffee as a final product;
- To promote domestic consumption of coffee and price.

== Relation to International Coffee Organization ==
In February 2022, Uganda announced that it was suspending its membership to the International Coffee Organization (ICO), for two years. This was on account of Uganda's perception that ICO looks out for the interests of the consumer countries, with little concern for the interests of the producing nations.

The managing director of UCDA, Emmanuel Iyamulemye, said at the time, that "suspending membership for two years will give Uganda a chance to use the resources to further enhance our coffee sector.. and focus on ..increasing production to 20 million bags by 2025/2030."

== See also ==
- Economy of Uganda
- Agriculture in Uganda
- Monthly Coffee Analysis Reports
- Ministry of Agriculture, Animal Industry and Fisheries (Uganda)
