= Nsambya Home Care =

Department of Nsambya Hospital

Coordinates: 00°18′06″N 32°35′06″E

Nsambya Home Care (NHC) is one of the departments of Nsambya Hospital, a faith-based hospital in Uganda. The department offers medical and psychosocial support to people living with HIV/AIDS (PLWHAs). Established in 1987 by Miriam Duggan, it is a department of St. Francis Hospital Nsambya. Since its founding, NHC has provided care and treatment services to over 15,000 clients. With support from the AIDS Relief program and in collaboration with Catholic Relief Services, the program started providing antiretroviral medications in 2004 and so far close to 2000 active patients are benefiting from treatment. It is headquartered in Nsambya, a section of Kampala, Uganda. A field office of the program is located at Ggaba, a southern suburb of Kampala. NHC is led by Maria Nannyonga Musoke, a consultant paediatrician of Nsambya Hospital.

== History ==
NHC was founded and initially managed by the Franciscan Sisters as a response to the AIDS scourge in 1987. There was overcrowding in the Nsambya Hospital wards; hence the opening of a separate department for AIDS patients. Rooms were eventually put up for counselling to ensure confidentiality. The very weak clients who were not getting better were visited in their homes by a doctor, a nurse, and a counsellor.

In 1987 a total number of 327 clients were registered. The numbers increased as years went by. Different interventions were put in place to respond to challenges that cropped up. These included the creation of outreach clinics, Behavior Change Programs, Paediatric Counselling, Income Generating Activities, Youth Forum for the youth, Pastoral care services, Education for life programs, AIDS sensitization programs and involvement of client volunteers in the program.

Aids patient Care in areas of high sero-prevalence is becoming a problem, with increasing demand on hospital bed capacity. Various innovative approaches have been tried to provide care, but cost analysis against benefits of these approaches has rarely been done. Nsambya Hospital used inpatient, outpatient and outreach mobile Home Care for AIDS to provide a continuum of care since 1989. Hospital records of AIDS patients cared for and the corresponding costs were analyzed for a rough cost benefit evaluation of this approach.

Chronic illness is a common but very much neglected health problem in sub Saharan Africa. People suffer from longstanding pain and symptoms caused by ‘incurable’ conditions like cancer, heart disease, diabetes, COPD and kidney failure. In the last decade, the numerous AIDS patients have joined this group. Their main and common problem is a longstanding, progressively debilitating condition, which silently undermines their physical and mental health and weakens their socio-economic status.

To date Nsambya Home Care has more than 10,000 active clients involving children. This paper will discuss the interventions put up by a religious based organization in fighting, and caring for AIDS patients without blaming or condemning them.

== Activities ==
Nsambya Home Care offers services like;

- HIV testing and CD4 count,viral load monitoring
- Antiretroviral drugs and treatment of opportunistic infections
- Outreach programmes to patients and to schools and communities
- After care services to patients and provision of necessities like food every week.
- Behavioral change programmes especially in schools
- Training volunteers and counsellors to take care of patients
- Controlling stigmatization:

Children sick with HIV/AIDS are ostracized by family members, communities, schools and playmates who fear contracting the disease. They are denied play, stopped from going to school, used by own parents to ascertain own sero-status. Those who opt to take them up demand for blood check ups against the children's will. Children are always told lies about the kind of check up, counselling for Pre-test is always given to care-givers and not the real children, the sero-status is always discussed and known by relatives or care-givers and medical workers but not the children themselves.

The whole situation of counselling and testing children defy the issue of making an "informed decision" for the HIV test and the professional ethics regarding confidentiality. The patient's own consent on whatever is to be done on him or her is broken since the child's care-giver handles the counselling and caring that involves the child. The children's own stories about their feeling and problems they meet regarding HIV/AIDS are tested and counselling shared. The importance of disclosure to the child, confidentiality and information sharing concerning the child's sero-status are analyzed.

"Nsambya Home Care informs people about the spread of HIV/AIDS. Maria Nannyonga said that AIDS is spread mainly through having unprotected sex with an infected person. Secondly, she said the HIV virus is spread through blood transfusion. This still a big problem because some of the blood donated could contain the AIDS virus, but because it is still in its early stages (the window period), the blood still tests negative and then transfused into a patient.

The virus can also be transmitted from mother to child. This can be before, during or after childbirth. The virus can only be transmitted to an unborn child if there is a damage to the placenta otherwise an infected mother can give birth to a healthy baby. A baby on the other hand can get infected through breast feeding. The infected mother is thus expected to only bottle feed the baby since the breast milk contains HIV. AIDS can also be further spread through un-sterilized instruments like needles, razors, knives. This mainly affects traditionalists who are exposed to such objects especially during circumcision.

There is a general belief that one can be infected during the act of deep kissing. However, according to the doctor at the center, this is only possible if the uninfected person has a sore in the mouth or if that person swallows twenty liters of saliva of the infected person. Normal kissing usually does not carry those risks.

NHC teaches about the signs and symptoms of HIV/AIDS. There are major and minor symptoms. It also teaches about various ways of reducing the transmission of the HIV infection. Dr Erika Vlieghe a physician who previously worked at NHC writes *

"Monday morning, a rural district hospital in Uganda. A ward round through Female Ward. A 40-year-old woman has been brought in with diabetic coma. She is actually recovering while receiving insulin, but how to continue the treatment at the village? Two women in their fifties are recovering from another exacerbation of cardiac failure. For one, it is already her third admission since last summer. They complain of painful ascites and their failure to perform the household tasks. In the same room, three women aged between 25 and 45 are admitted with extensive and very painful breast tumours. They are very embarrassed about the deformities and the smell. The nearest place offering specialist care for cancer patients and radiotherapy is 400 kilometres (250 mi) away, through a war-ridden area.

In the next bed, an emaciated old lady has hardly been eating or drinking for the last 6 weeks because of an oesophageal tumour. In the afternoon, a 45-year-old women is found to have a locally spread tumour of the cervix. She thinks she cannot afford to go for radiotherapy, although the smelling vaginal discharge and the pain are really disturbing her. A young man is very uncomfortable with his legs swollen and knobbly because of Kaposi's sarcoma. He does not know he has AIDS. He hopes he can go back to the kraal soon. In the evening, an old man arrives from a place 100 kilometres (62 mi) away because of a painful hard swelling in his upper abdomen: a gross liver tumour.

Unfortunately, the needs of those chronically ill are not met by far in most existing health care services. If the illness has a treatable or stabilisable cause (e.g. diabetes, or some types and stages of cancer), often the treatment is not available, not maintained for a long period or not given in an adequate way. Thereby, little or no attention is given to the broader needs in chronic illness: follow-up, counselling, information and education, involvement of the relatives, social or material support, rehabilitation. It seems that in general, chronic illness does not fit in most of the existing services, as they are designed for acute and communicable diseases and for standardisable, short episode illnesses. In most programs and reports on health needs in sub Saharan Africa, chronic illness is not given adequate attention or the priority it deserves. There are several reasons for this lack of priority. Some are true, and difficult to resolve, but many arguments originate from misconceptions, myths and a reluctance to face changing health patterns in developing countries."

== Funding ==
Nsambya Home Care is funded by a number of organisations like Catholic Relief Services and CAFOD. However, with the completion of the new building project, there is still a shortage of funds to care for the ever increasing number of patients. This is the list of funded programmes in the country by CAFOD, ActionAid, Christian Aid, ICCO and Oxfam.

- Kiyinda Mityana Diocese Social Services Department - Sponsored by CAFOD
- NUDIPU - Sponsored by CAFOD
- Nsambya AIDS Home Care – Sponsored by CAFOD
- Ugandan Joint Christian Council (UJCC) – Sponsored by ICCO
- Grassland Foundation – Sponsored by ActionAid
- Kumi AIDS Support Organisation (KASO) – Sponsored by ActionAid
- Uganda Women’s Concern Ministry (UWCM) – Sponsored by ActionAid
- Integrated Development Activities (IDAC) – Sponsored by ActionAid
- Nsambya Home Care – Sponsored by CAFOD
- ACET – Sponsored by Christian Aid
- Mission Moving Mountains (MMM) – Sponsored by Oxfam
- KADP – Sponsored by CAFOD

== Future and development ==
On 4 December 2007, Nsambya Home Care celebrated 20 years of hard work and dedicated service to communities affected by the HIV pandemic. Celebrations to mark NHC's 20th anniversary coincided with the official opening of the new building complex just opposite Nsambya Hospital main gate and this was the venue for the day. The guest of honour, Cardinal Emmanuel Wamala, laid the foundation stone.
