= Nsambya =

Neighborhood in Kampala

Nsambya Nsambya Hill
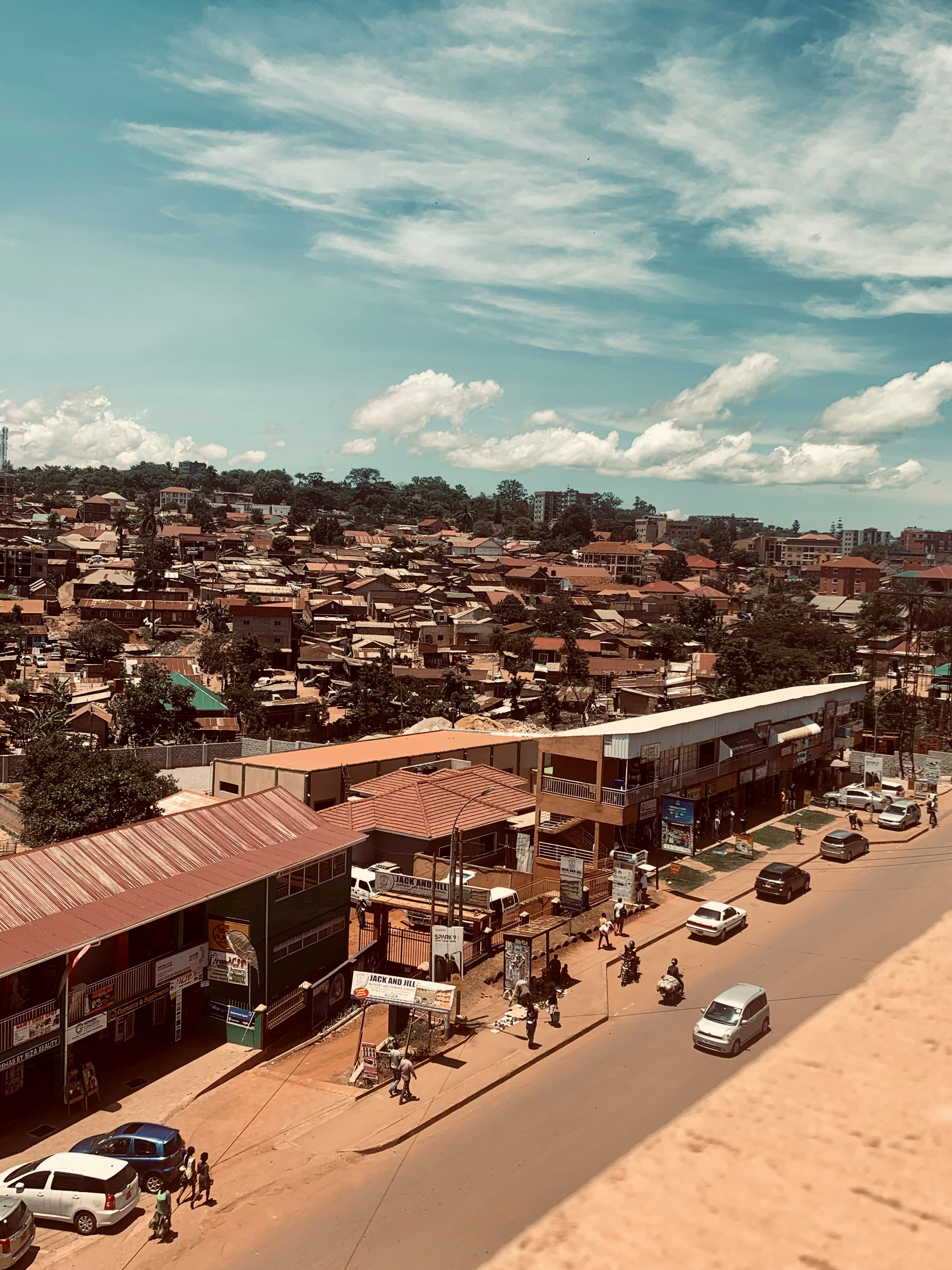

- Location in Kampala
- Coordinates: 0°17′57″N 32°35′17″E
- Country: Uganda
- Region: Central Region
- District: Kampala Capital City Authority
- Division: Makindye Division
- Elevation: 4,010 ft (1,220 m)

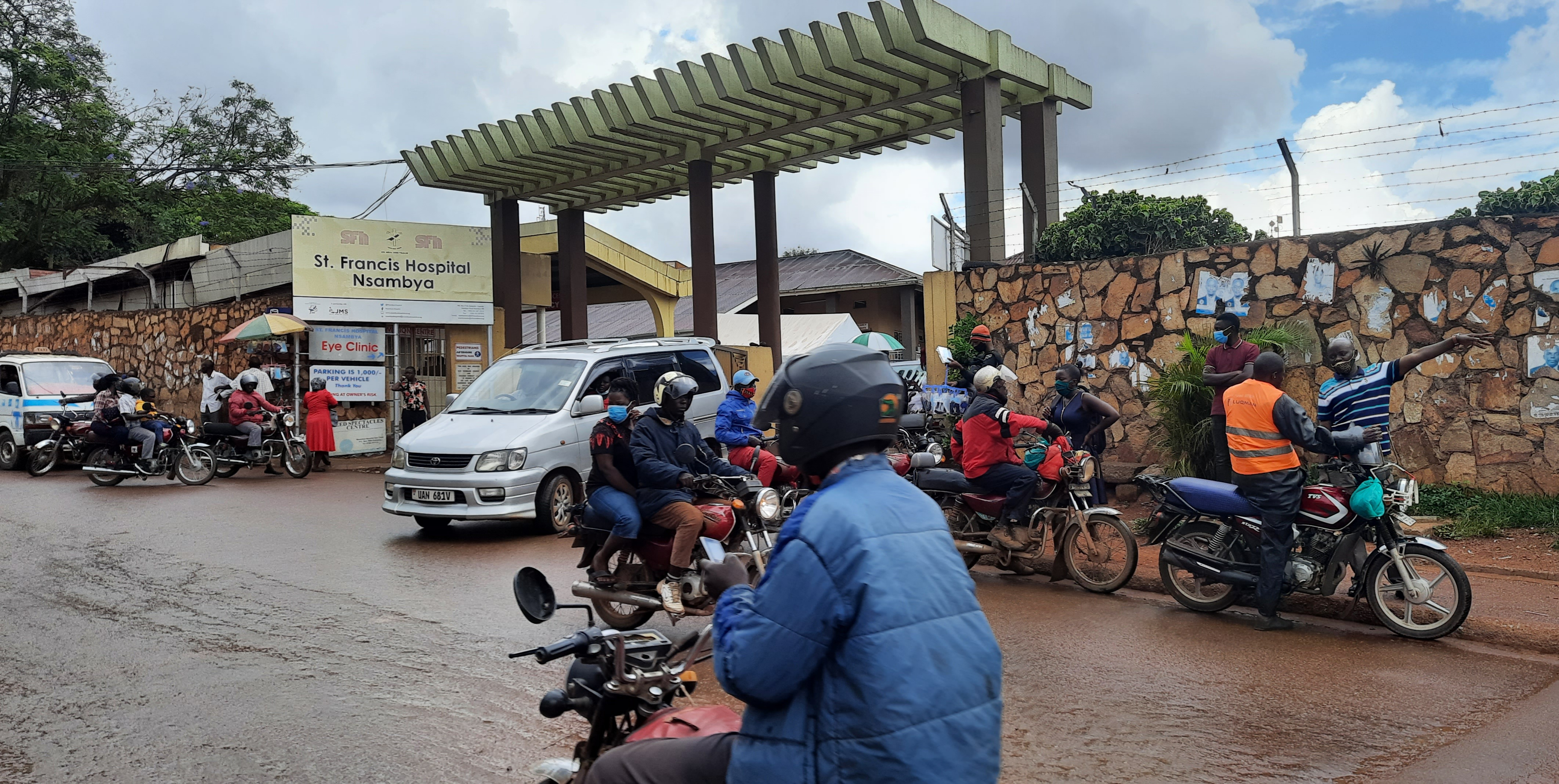
Entrance at Nsambya hospital.

Nsambya is a hill in the center of Kampala, the capital and largest city in Uganda. The name also refers to the upscale and middle-class neighborhoods that have been developed on the hill and its slopes.

== Location ==
Nsambya is located approximately 5 kilometres (3 mi) south-southeast of the central business district of Kampala, along the Kampala–Ggaba Road. The coordinates of Nsambya Hill are 0°17'57.0"N, 32°35'17.0"E (Latitude:0.299167; Latitude:32.588056). Nsambya Hill rises 4,010 feet (1,222 m) above mean sea level.

== Overview ==
Nsambya Hill is one of the seven original hills on which the city of Kampala was built. The seven original hills are: Nsambya, Kibuli, Nakasero, Mengo, Old Kampala, Namirembe and Lubaga.

Nsambya was occupied by the Mill Hill Fathers, led by Bishop Henry Hanlon, starting in 1895. The infrastructure that they set up on the hill includes a Catholic Mission, a Catholic Church, a Mission Hospital, separate elementary and secondary schools for boys and girls, among others.

== Points of interest ==
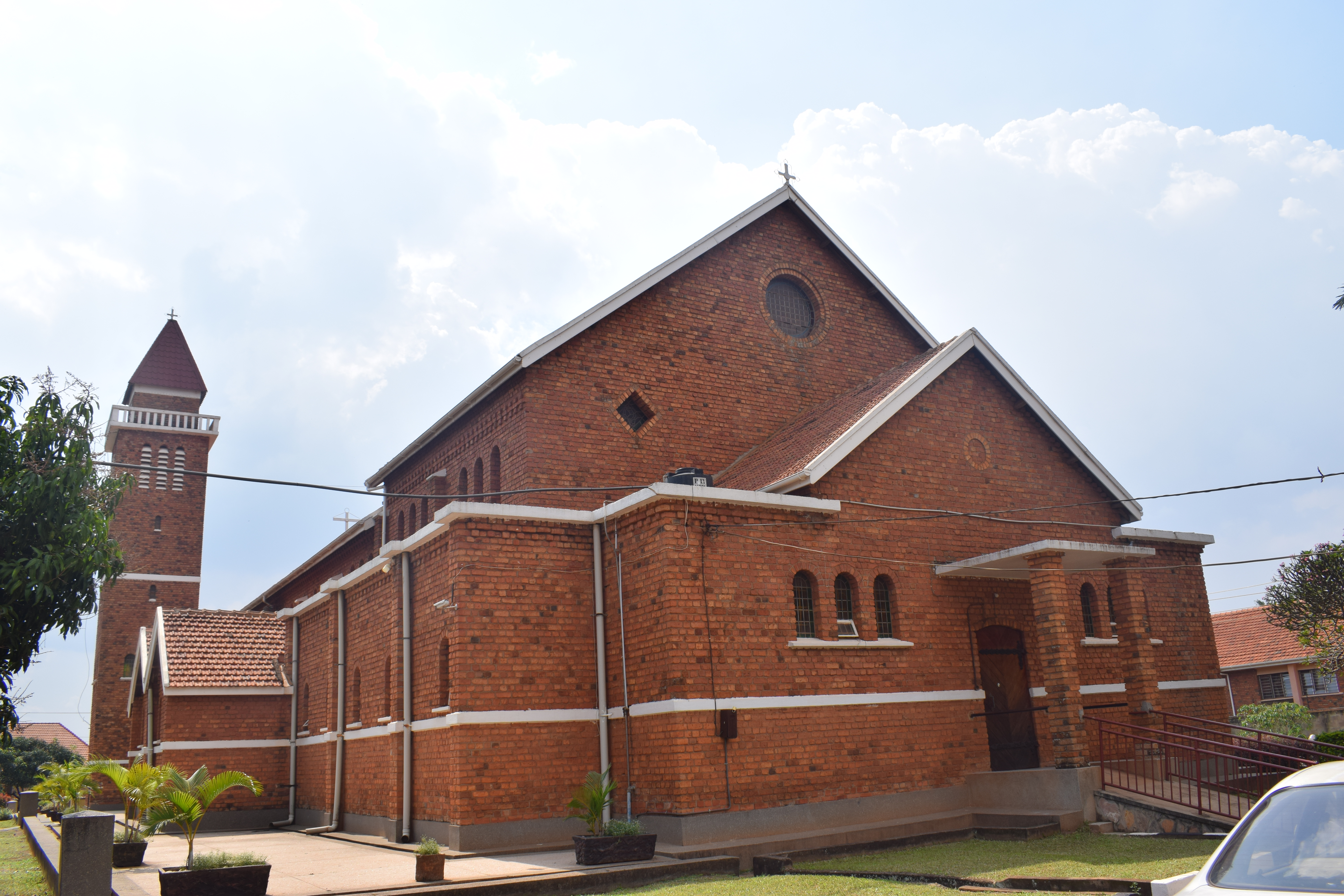
Saint Peter's Cathedral Nsambya

The points of interest on Nsambya Hill include St. Francis Hospital Nsambya, a 540-bed tertiary referral and teaching non-profit hospital. owned by the Roman Catholic Archdiocese of Kampala and administered by the Little Sisters of St. Francis.

Nsambya Home Care (NHC) is one of the departments of Nsambya Hospital. "The department offers medical and psychosocial support to people living with HIV/AIDS (PLWHAs)".

Other notable points of interest include (a) Radio Sapientia Uganda 94.4FM (b) Saint Peter's Cathedral Nsambya, a place of worship affiliated with the Catholic Church (c) Mother Kevin Postgraduate Medical School of Uganda Martyrs University, located at Nsambya Hospital (d) the American Embassy to Uganda and Cavendish University Uganda, whose campus is located along Ggaba Road, opposite the American Embassy.

== Notable people ==
- Josephine Nambooze (born 1930), physician, was born and grew up in Nsambya.
- Hassan Wasswa (born 1988), footballer
- Patrick Edema (born 1992), footballer
- Shafiq Kagimu (born 1998), footballer

== See also ==
- Kabalagala
- Kibuli
- Nsambya Home Care
- List of hospitals in Uganda
- List of medical schools in Uganda
- Teresa Kearney
