= Agriculture in Uganda =

Uganda's favorable soil conditions and climate have contributed to the country's agricultural success. Most areas of Uganda have usually received plenty of rain. In some years, small areas of the southeast and southwest have averaged more than 150 millimeters per month. In the north, there is often a short dry season in December and January. Temperatures vary only a few degrees above or below 20 °C but are moderated by differences in altitude.

These conditions have allowed continuous cultivation in the south but only annual cropping in the north, and the driest northeastern corner of the country has supported only pastoralism. Although population growth has created pressure for land in a few areas, land shortages have been rare, and only about one-third of the estimated area of arable land was under cultivation by 1989.

== Co-operatives ==
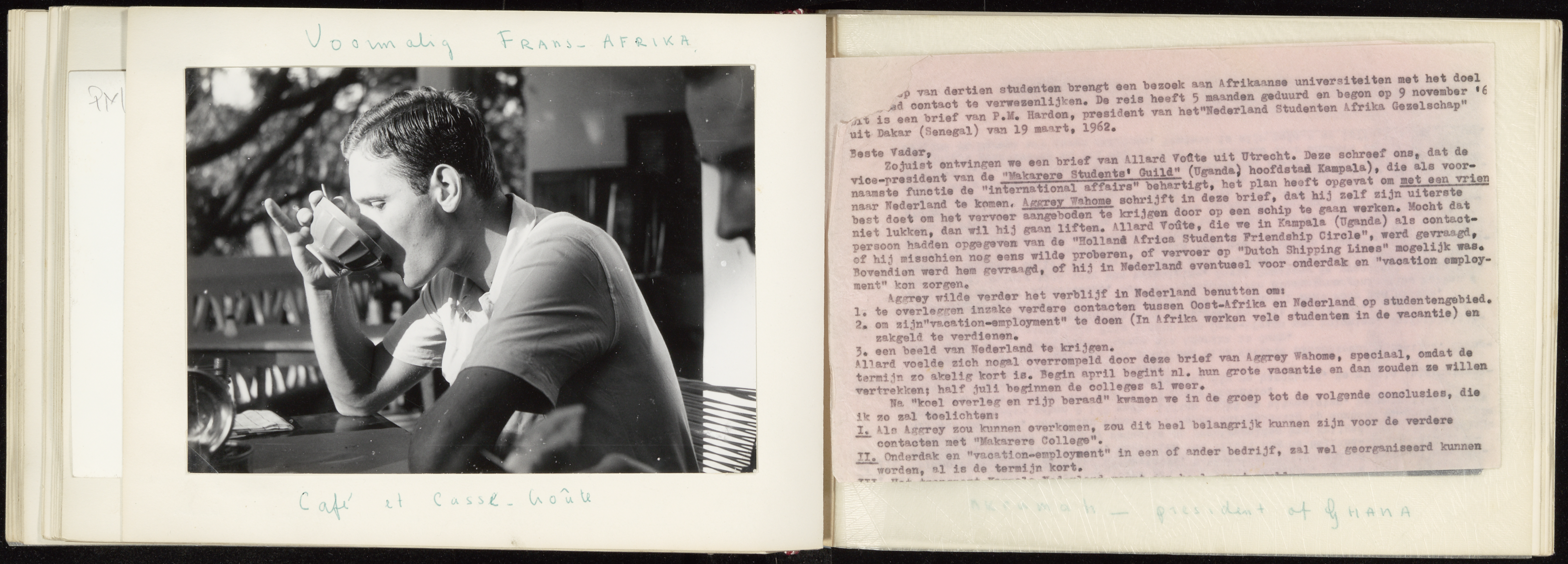
ASC Leiden – NSAG – Crebolder 2 – 27 – "Former French Africa-Café et Casse-croûte" – French Africa, perhaps Benin – January–February 1962

In the 1950s until independence in 1962, British Colonial Office policy encouraged the development of co-operatives for subsistence farmers to partially convert to selling their crops: principally coffee, cotton, tobacco, and maize. David Gordon Hines (1915–2000) (as Commissioner of Co-operatives from 1959 to independence in 1962 and then as a civil servant until 1965) developed the movement by encouraging eventually some 500,000 farmers to join co-operatives.

He, as an accountant, plus a team of 20 (British) District Co-operative Officers and some 400 Ugandans established the constitution and accounting procedures of each co-operative. They ran courses at a co-operative college in Kampala; settled disputes; established a co-operative bank; and developed marketing in a population that largely had no experience of accounts and marketing. Each co-operative had 100 to 150 farmer members who elected their own committees.

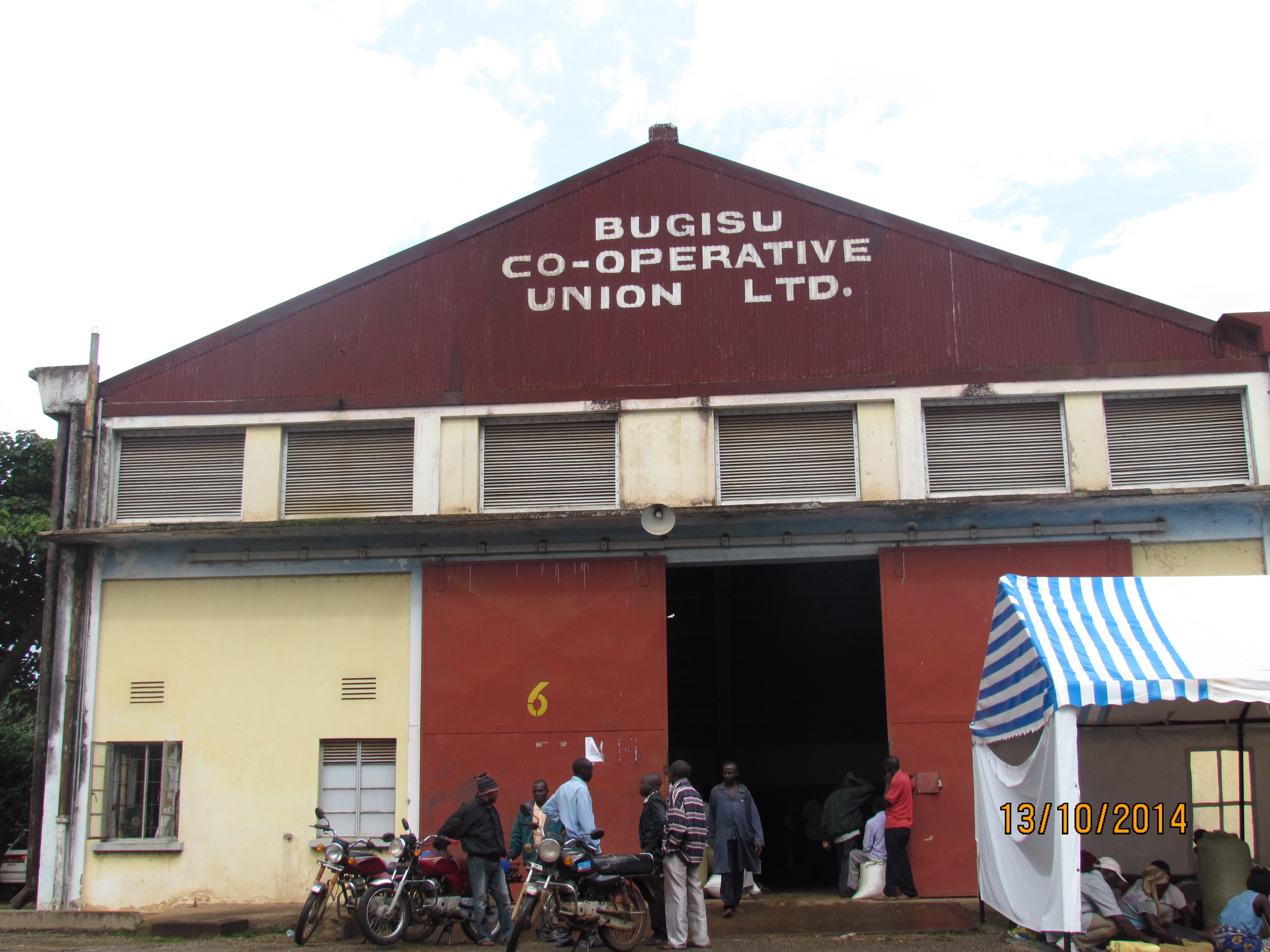
Bugisu cooperative union

In each political district, there was a co-operative "union" which built stores and, eventually, with government money, processing factories: cotton ginneries, tobacco dryers, and maize mills. The number of farmers involved rose exponentially as the co-operatives made the profits that the Asian traders had previously made. The roads, other infrastructure and security were better in this colonial period than in the late 1900s, so allowing relatively efficient transport and marketing of agricultural products.

After the Idi Amin 1971-8 era of massacres and tortures, David Hines in 1982 returned to Uganda in a World Bank delegation to find decrepit factories that had been kept going as long as possible by cannibalising other factories.

More recently, the Hope Development Initiative under Agnes Atim Apea has been re-establishing cooperatives for female farmers in several areas of Uganda.

== 1970s ==
Throughout the 1970s, political insecurity, mismanagement, and a lack of adequate resources seriously eroded incomes from commercial agriculture. Production levels in general were lower in the 1980s than in the 1960s. Technological improvements had been delayed by economic stagnation, and agricultural production still used primarily unimproved methods of production on small, widely scattered farms, with low levels of capital outlay. Other problems facing farmers included the disrepair of the nation's roads, the nearly destroyed marketing system, increasing inflation, and low producer prices. These factors contributed to low volumes of export commodity production and a decline in per capita food production and consumption in the late 1980s.

The decline in agricultural production, if sustained, posed major problems in terms of maintaining export revenues and feeding Uganda's expanding population. Despite these serious problems, agriculture continued to dominate the economy. In the late 1980s, agriculture (in the monetary and non-monetary economy) contributed about two-thirds of GDP, 95% of export revenues, and 40% of government revenues.

Roughly 20% of regular wage earners worked in commercial agricultural enterprises, and an additional 60% of the work force earned some income from farming. Agricultural output was generated by about 2.2 million small-scale producers on farms with an average of 2.5 hectares of land. The 1987 RDP called for efforts both to increase production of traditional cash crops, including coffee, cotton, tea, and tobacco, and to promote the production of nontraditional agricultural exports, such as maize, beans, groundnuts (peanuts), soybeans, sesame seeds, and a variety of fruit and fruit products.

== Production ==
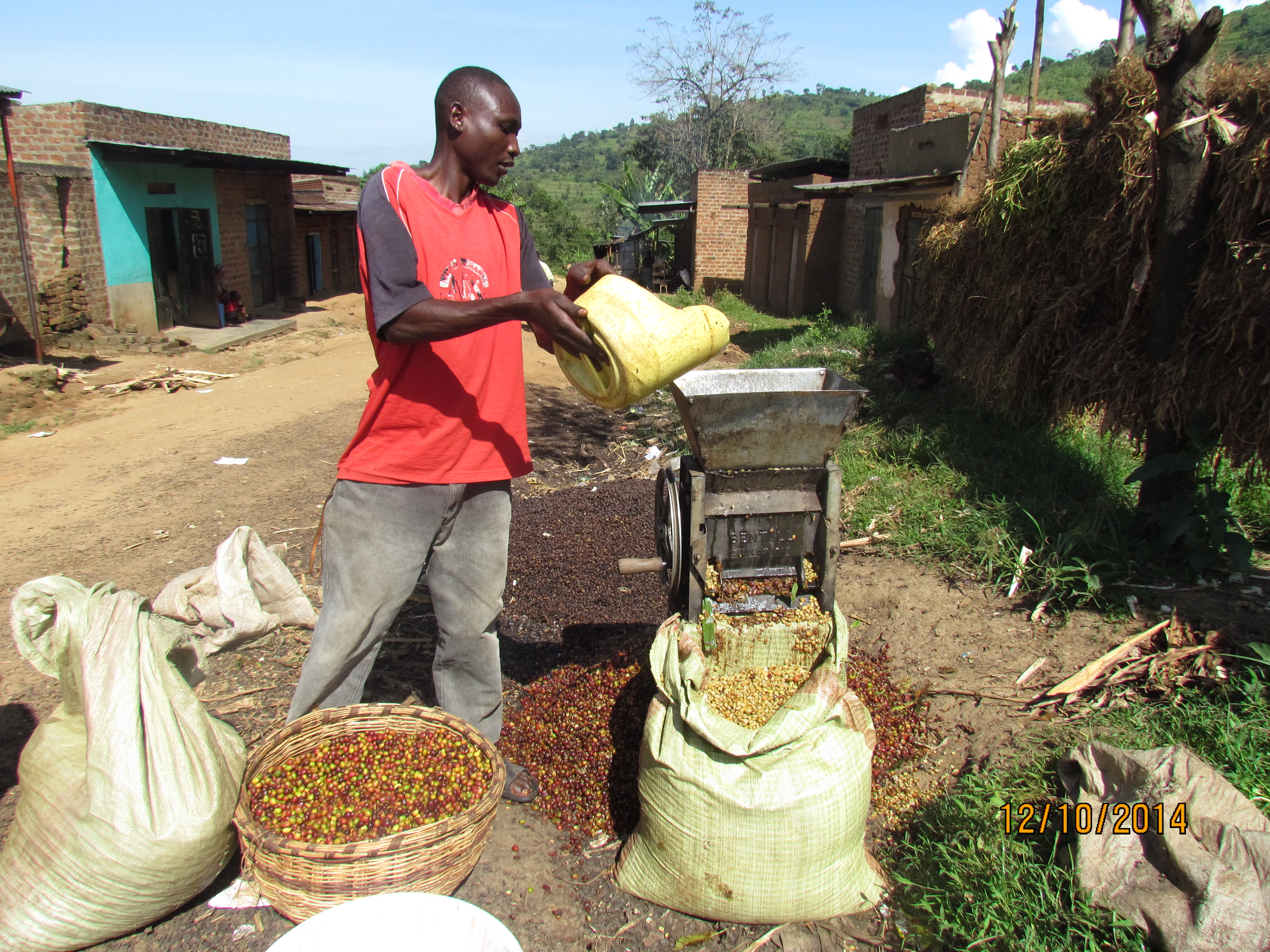
A man pulping coffee using a machine in Mbale district in Uganda

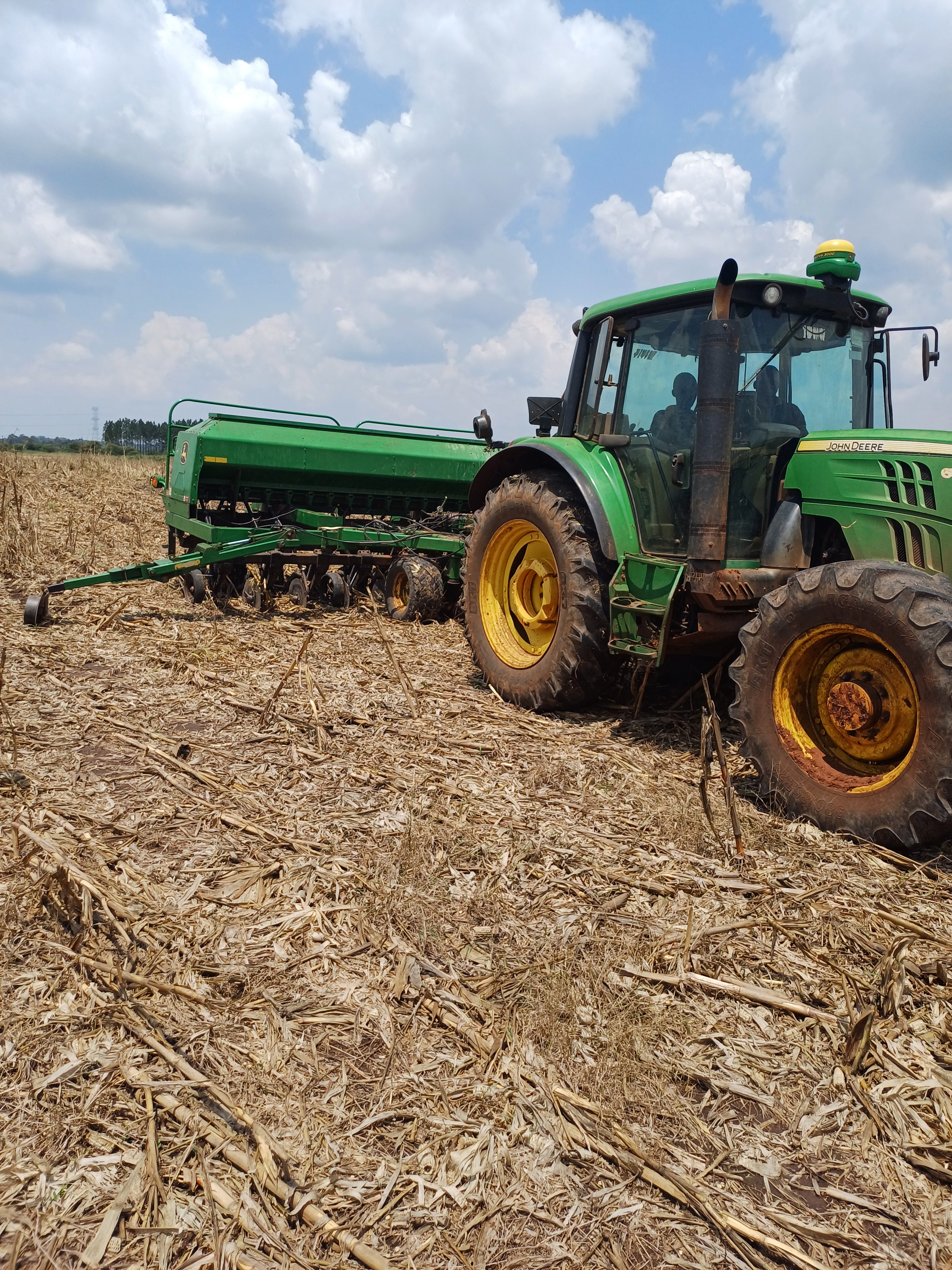
More farms adopting to no-till tech

Uganda produced in 2018:

- 3.9 million tons of sugarcane;
- 3.8 million tons of plantain (4th largest producer in the world, losing only to Congo, Ghana and Cameroon);
- 2.9 million tons of maize;
- 2.6 million tons of cassava;
- 1.5 million tons of sweet potato (7th largest producer in the world);
- 1.0 million tons of bean;
- 1.0 million tons of vegetable;
- 532 thousand tons of banana;
- 360 thousand tons of onion;
- 298 thousand tons of sorghum;
- 260 thousand tons of rice;
- 245 thousand tons of sunflower seed;
- 242 thousand tons of peanut;
- 211 thousand tons of coffee (10th largest producer in the world);
- 209 thousand tons of millet;

In addition to smaller productions of other agricultural products, like cotton (87 thousand tons), tea (62 thousand tons), tobacco (35 thousand tons) and cocoa (27 thousand tons).

== Crops ==
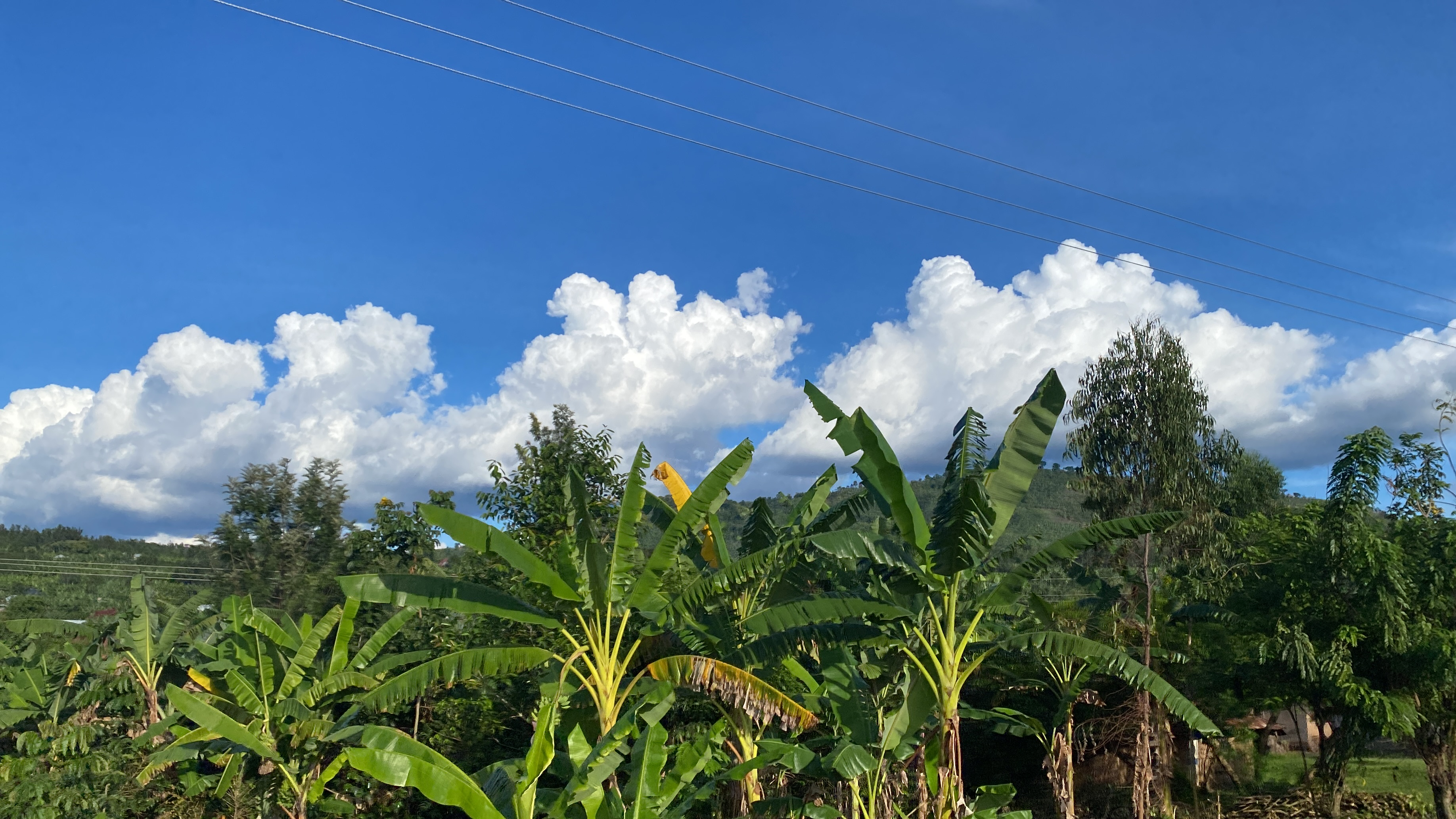
A banana platation with clouds above a green mountainous scenery in Western Uganda

Uganda's main food crops have been plantains, bananas, cassava, sweet potatoes, millet, sorghum, corn, beans, and groundnuts. Major cash crops have been coffee, cotton, tea, cocoa, vanilla and tobacco, although in the 1980s many farmers sold food crops to meet short-term expenses. The production of cotton, tea, and tobacco virtually collapsed during the late 1970s and early 1980s.

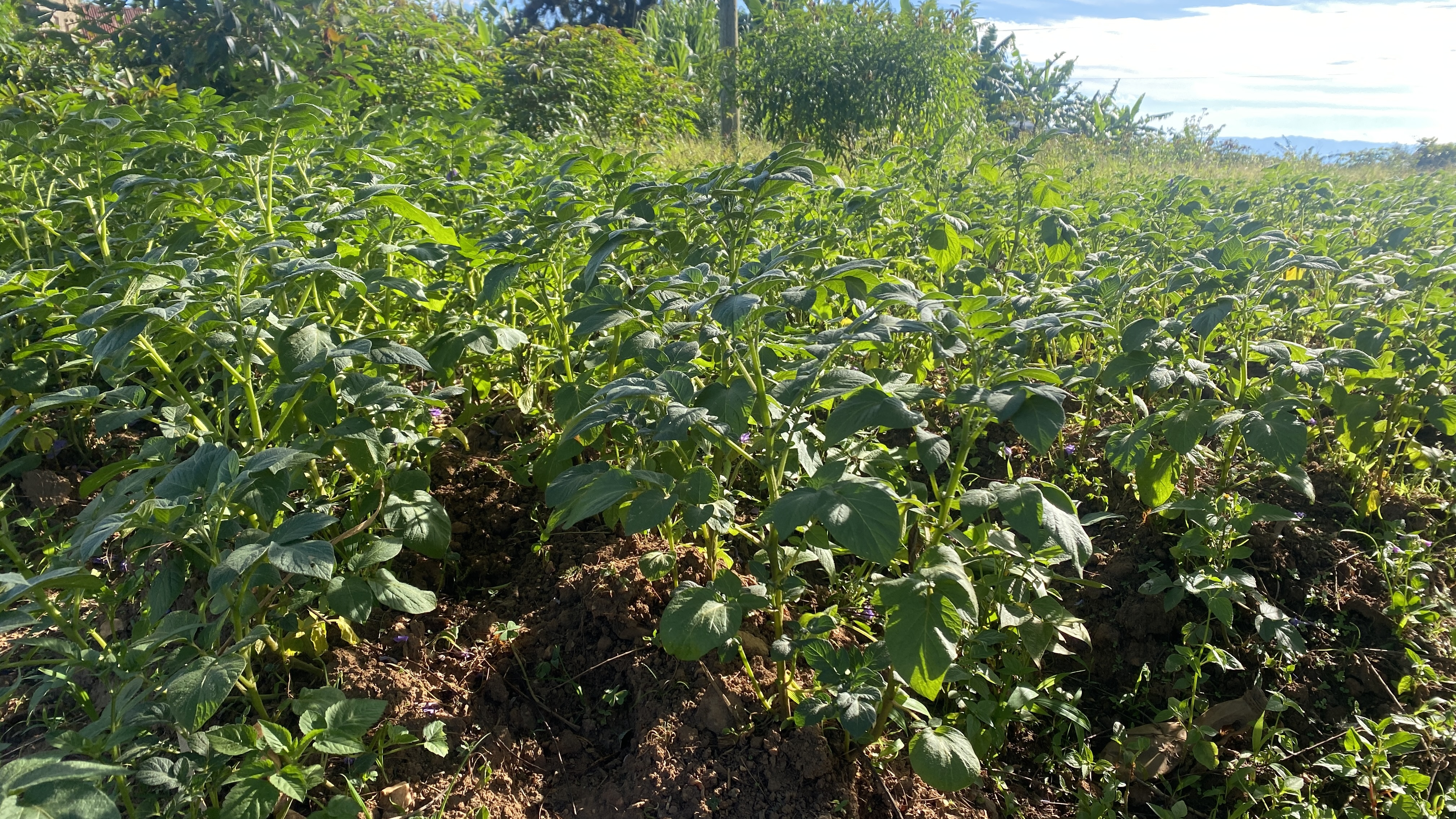
An Irish potato garden in Butare Kyamuhunga in Western Uganda

In the late 1980s, the government attempted to encourage diversification in commercial agriculture that would lead to a variety of nontraditional exports. The Uganda Development Bank and several other institutions supplied credit to local farmers, although small farmers also received credit directly from the government through agricultural cooperatives. For most small farmers, the main source of short-term credit was the policy of allowing farmers to delay payments for seeds and other agricultural inputs provided by cooperatives.

Cooperatives also handled most marketing activity, although marketing boards and private companies sometimes dealt directly with producers. Co-operatives had been very successful during the British Colonial period (see below) but later many farmers complained that cooperatives did not pay for produce until long after it had been sold. The generally low producer prices set by the government and the problem of delayed payments for produce prompted many farmers to sell produce at higher prices on illegal markets in neighboring countries. During most of the 1980s, the government steadily raised producer prices for export crops in order to maintain some incentive for farmers to deal with government purchasing agents, but these incentives failed to prevent widespread smuggling.

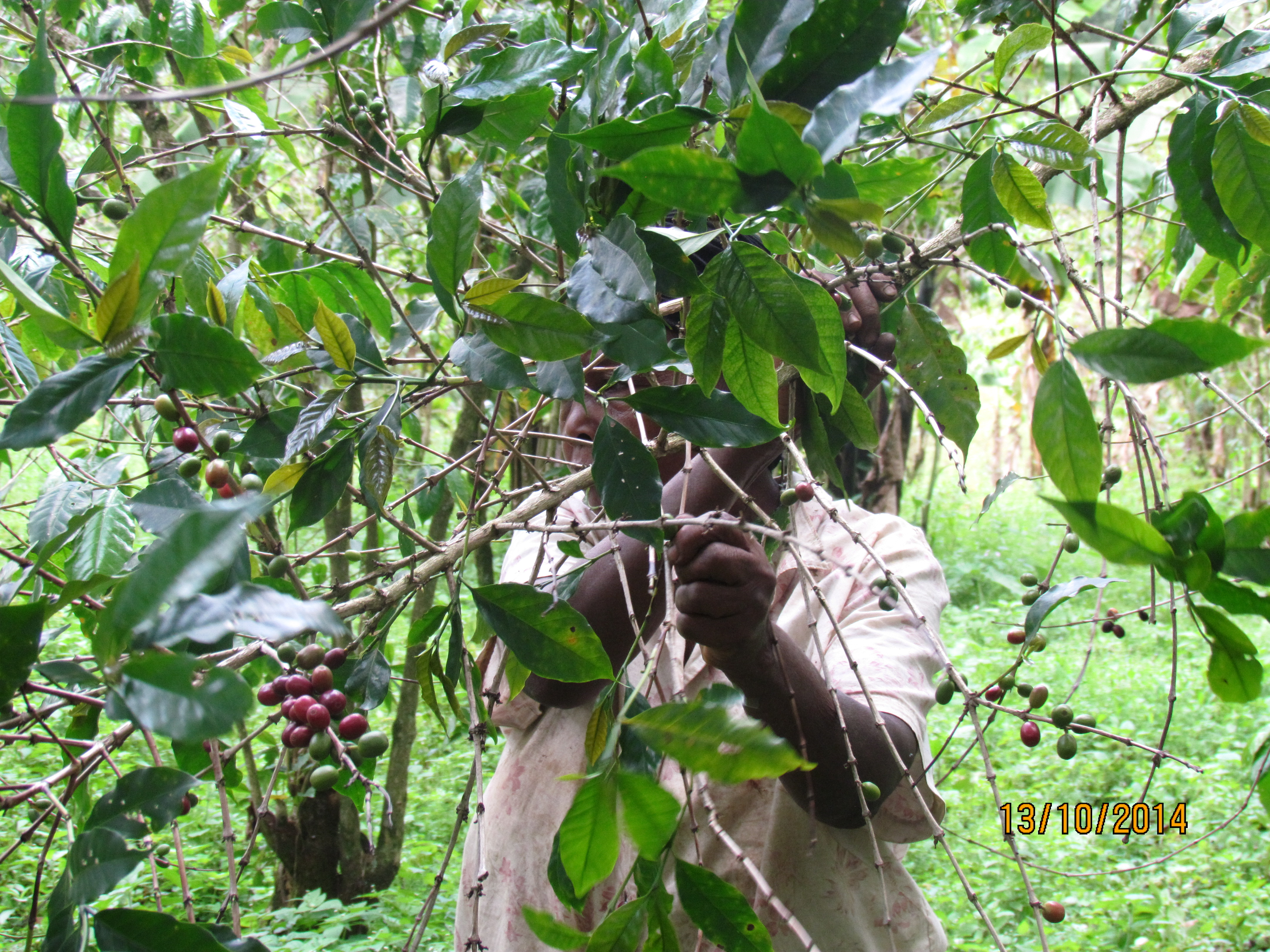
Coffee harvesting in Uganda

=== Coffee ===
Coffee has been Uganda's most important cash crop since the 1980s. In 2013, coffee exports totalled US$425.4 million.

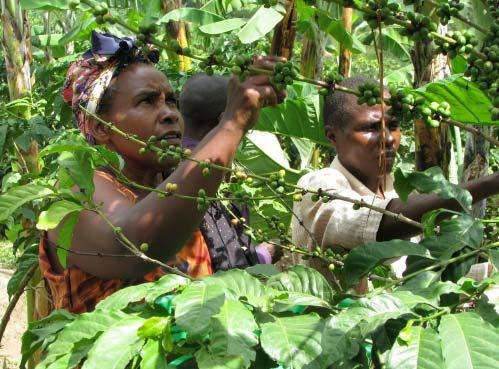
a female farmer from Uganda

Majority of Ugandan people rely on farming as their source of income in some cities woman own farms in order to provide for their families. A lot of farmers in Uganda face challenges like being able to access the market. The cost of transport is high which makes it difficult for farmers especially during wet weather conditions.

The Uganda Coffee Development Authority Uganda Coffee Development Authority overseas the country's coffee industry.

=== Cotton ===
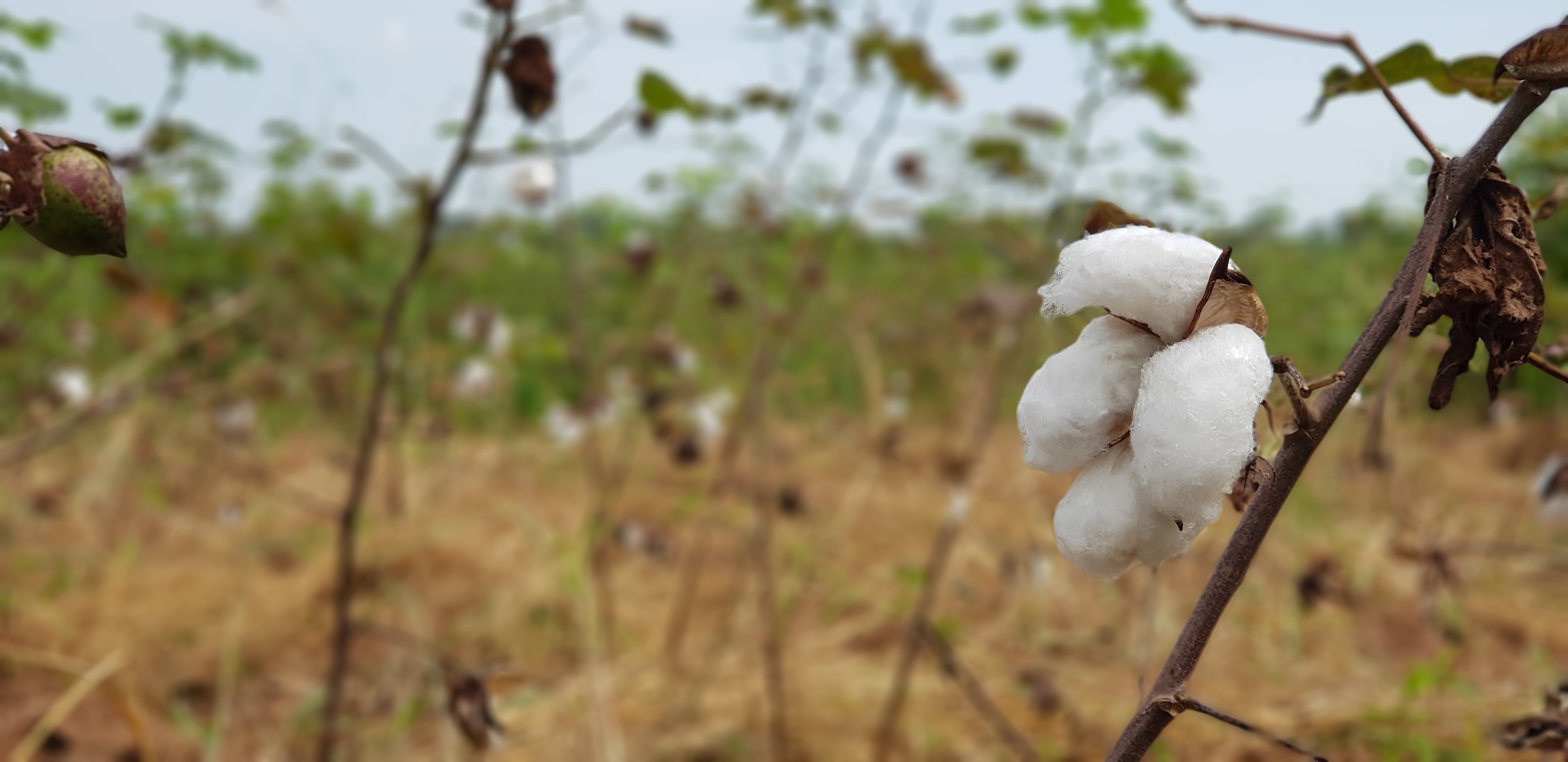
Cotton in Uganda

In the 1950s, cotton was the second most important traditional cash crop in Uganda, contributing 25 percent of total agricultural exports. By the late 1970s, this figure had dropped to 3 percent, and government officials were pessimistic about reviving this industry in the near future. Farmers had turned to other crops in part because of the labor-intensive nature of cotton cultivation, inadequate crop-finance programs, and a generally poor marketing system. The industry began to recover in the 1980s. The government rehabilitated ginneries and increased producer prices. In 1985, 199,000 hectares were planted in cotton, and production had risen from 4,000 tons to 16,300 tons in five years.

Cotton exports earned US$31.7 million in 2013, compared to US$86.0 million in 2012.

Cotton provided the raw materials for several local industries, such as textile mills, cotton oil and soap factories, and animal feed factories. And in the late 1980s, it provided another means of diversifying the economy. The government accordingly initiated an emergency cotton production program, which provided extension services, tractors, and other inputs for cotton farmers. At the same time, the government raised cotton prices from USh 32/= to 80/= for a kilogram of grade A cotton and from 18/= to 42/= for Grade B cotton in 1989. However, prospects for the cotton industry in the 1990s were still uncertain.

The Uganda Cotton Development Authority or CDO was created in 1994 by Act of Parliament; the CDO is a semi-autonomous body of the Uganda Ministry of Agriculture, Animal Industry and Fisheries.

=== Tea ===
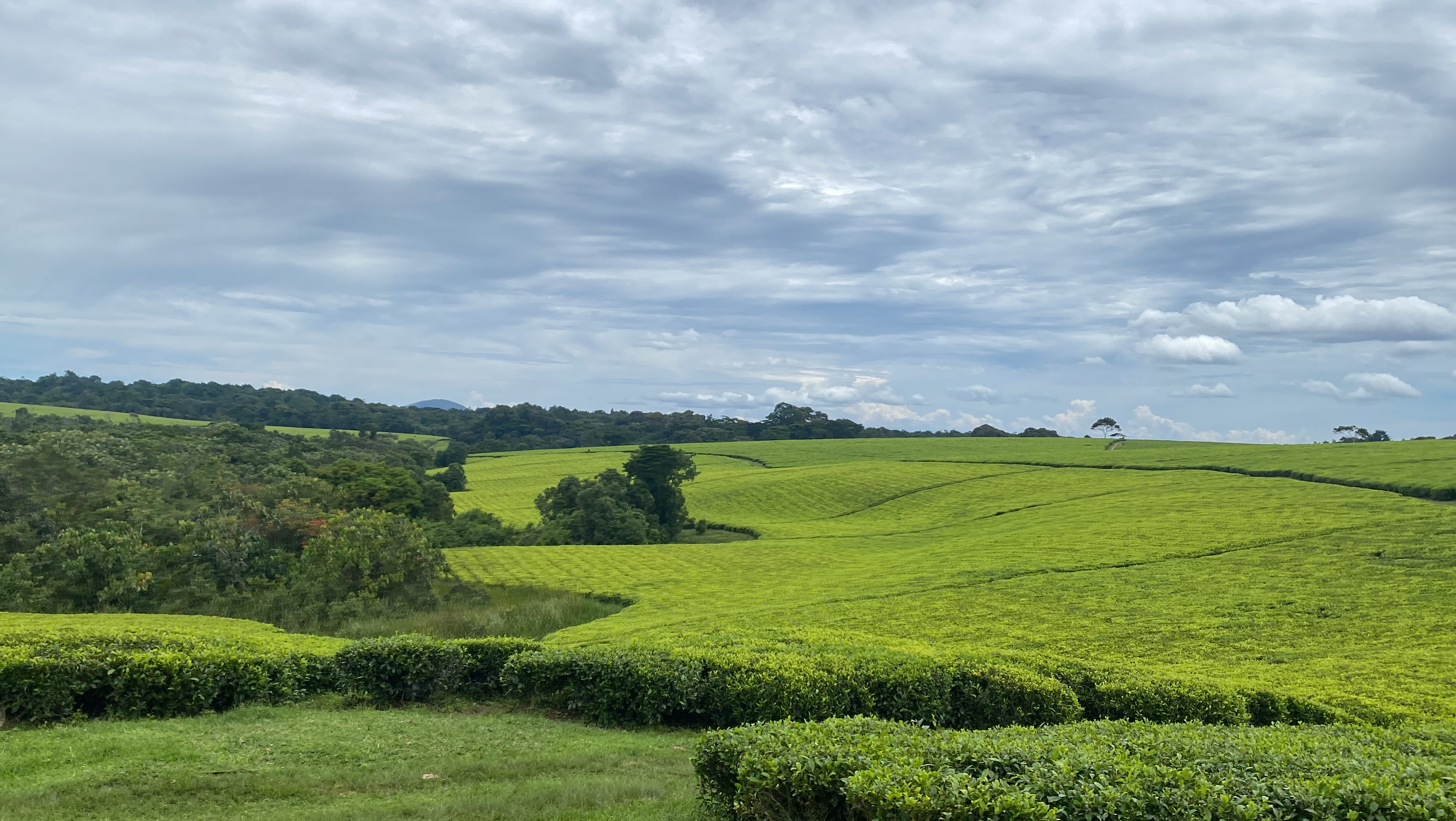
Tea plantations of Kyamuhunga in Bushenyi district in Uganda

Favorable climate and soil conditions enabled Uganda to develop some of the world's best quality tea. Production almost ceased in the 1970s, when the government expelled many owners of tea estates, mostly Indians in Uganda. Many tea farmers also reduced production as a result of warfare and economic upheaval. Successive governments after Idi Amin encouraged owners of tea estates to intensify their cultivation of existing hectarage. Mitchell Cotts (British) returned to Uganda in the early 1980s and formed the Toro and Mityana Tea Company (Tamteco) in a joint venture with the government. Tea production subsequently increased from 1,700 tons of tea produced in 1981 to 5,600 tons in 1985. These yields did not approach the high of 22,000 tons that had been produced in the peak year of 1974, however, and they declined slightly after 1985.

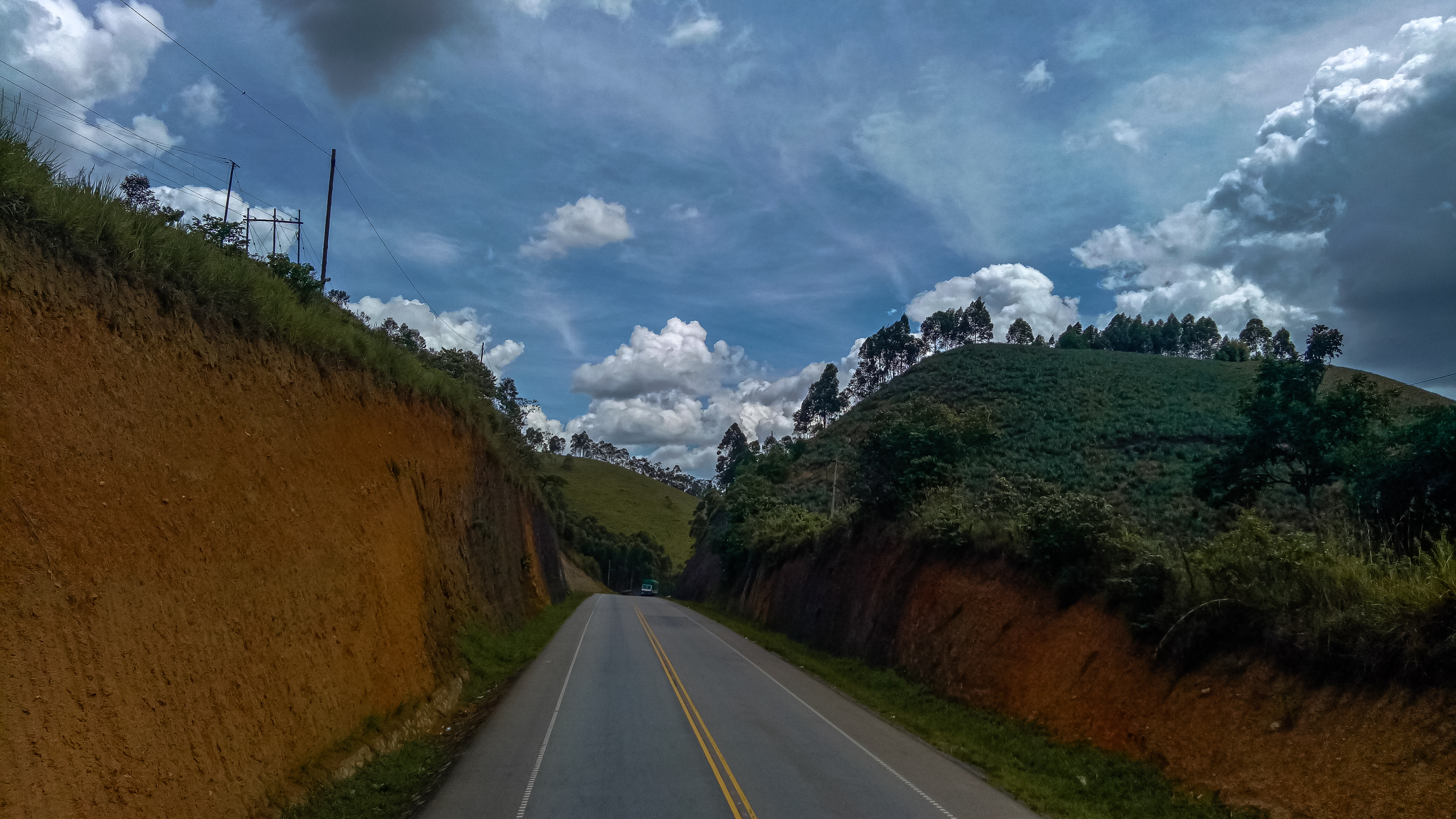
Tea plantations near Igara

In 1988, the government doubled producer prices, to 20/=per kilogram, to expand tea production and reduce the nation's traditional dependence on coffee exports, but tea production remained well under capacity. In 1989, only about one-tenth of the 21,000 hectares under tea cultivation were fully productive, producing about 4,600 tons of tea. Uganda exported about 90 percent of tea produced nationwide. In 1988 and 1989, the government used slightly more than 10 percent of the total to meet Uganda's commitments in barter exchanges with other countries. In 1990 the tea harvest rose to 6,900 tons, of which 4,700 were exported for earnings of US$3.6 million. The government hoped to produce 10,000 tons in 1991 to meet rising market demand.

Two companies, Tamteco and the Uganda Tea Corporation, a joint venture between the government and the Mehta Group, managed most tea production. In 1989 Tamteco owned three large plantations, with a total of 2,300 hectares of land, but only about one-half of Tamteco's land was fully productive. IN 1989 the Uganda Tea Corporation had about 900 hectares in production and was expanding its landholdings.

The state-owned Agricultural Enterprises Limited managed about 3,000 hectares of tea, and an additional 9,000 hectares were farmed by about 11,000 smallholder farmers, who marketed their produce through the parastatal Uganda Tea Growers' Corporation (UTGC). Several thousand hectares of tea estates remained in a "disputed" category because their owners had been forced to abandon them. In 1990 many of these estates were being sold to private individuals by the departed Asians' Property Custodian Board as part of an effort to rehabilitate the industry and improve local management practices.

In 1990, both Tamteco and the Uganda Tea Corporation used most of their earnings to cover operational expenses and service corporate debts, so the expansion of Uganda's tea-producing capacity was still just beginning. The EEC and the World Bank provided assistance to resuscitate the smallholder segment of the industry, and the UTGC rehabilitated seven tea factories with assistance from the Netherlands. Both Tamteco and the Uganda Tea Corporation have been known among tea growers in Africa for their leading role in mechanization efforts. Both companies purchased tea harvesters from Australian manufacturers, financed in part by the Uganda Development Bank Limited, but mechanized harvesting and processing of tea was still slowed by shortages of operating capital.

=== Tobacco ===
For several years after independence, tobacco was one of Uganda's major foreign exchange earners, ranking fourth after coffee, cotton, and tea. Like all other traditional cash crops, tobacco production also suffered from Uganda's political insecurity and economic mismanagement. Most tobacco grew in the northwestern corner of the country, where violence became especially severe in the late 1970s, and rehabilitation of this industry was slow.

In 1981, for example, farmers produced only sixty-three tons of tobacco. There was some increase in production after 1981, largely because of the efforts of the British American Tobacco Company, which repossessed its former properties in 1984. Although the National Tobacco Corporation processed and marketed only 900 tons of tobacco in 1986, output had more than quadrupled by 1989.

=== Sugar ===
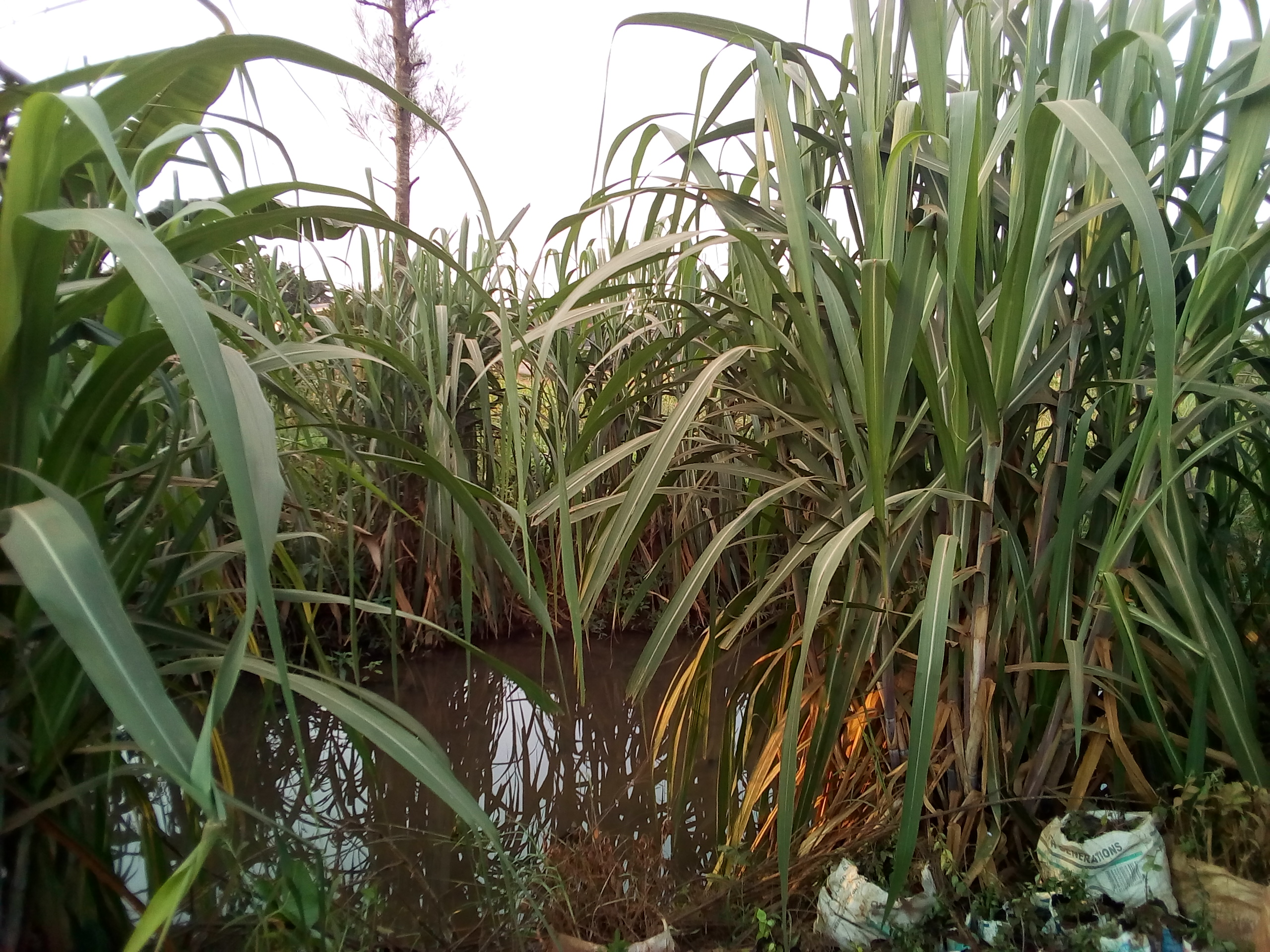
Sugarcane Plantation in Sonde Swamp in Mukono District

Uganda's once substantial sugar industry, which had produced 152,000 tons in 1968, almost collapsed by the early 1980s. By 1989 Uganda imported large amounts of sugar, despite local industrial capacity that could easily satisfy domestic demand. Sugar is by far Uganda's most profitable crop. Achieving local self-sufficiency by the year 1995 was the major government aim in rehabilitating this industry.

The two largest sugar processors are Kakira Sugar Works and Sugar Corporation of Uganda Limited, which by the late 1980s were joint government ventures with the Madhvani and Mehta families. The government commissioned the rehabilitation of these two estates in 1981, but the spreading civil war delayed the projects. By mid-1986, work on the two estates resumed, and Lugazi resumed production in 1988.

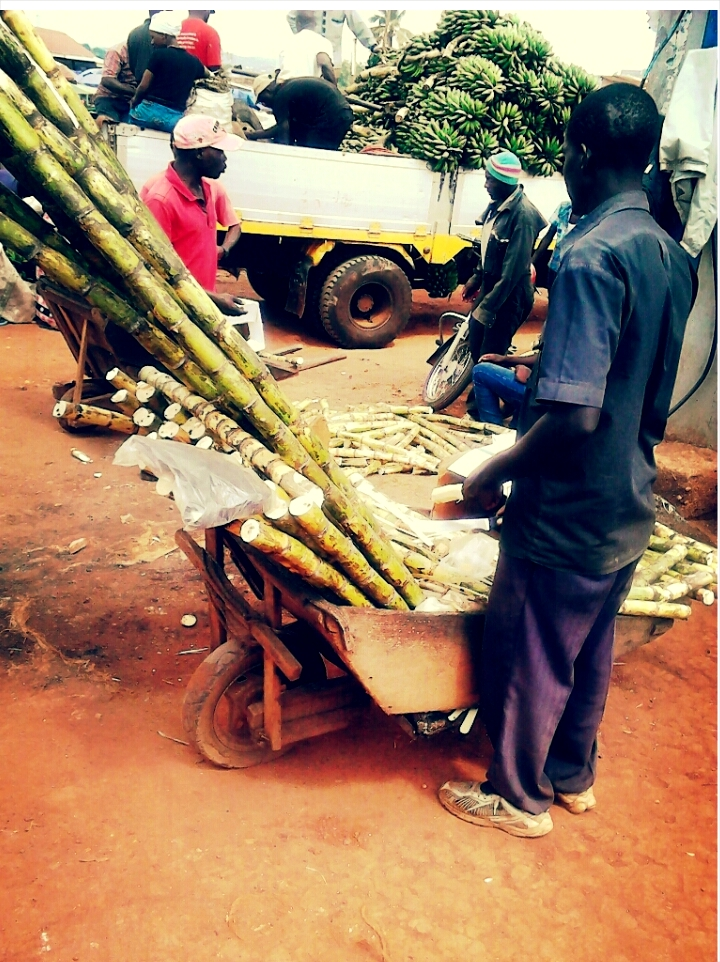
A Ugandan man selling sugarcanes

The government, together with outside development partners rehabilitated Kinyara Sugar Works Limited, with the factory resuming production in 1989. Rehabilitation of the Kakira estate, delayed by ownership problems, was completed in 1990 at a cost of about US$70 million, giving Uganda a refining capacity of at least 140,000 tons per year. Mayuge Sugar Industries Limited started production in 2005. Atiak Sugar Factory is expected to begin production in 2017, adding another 66,000 metric tonnes of powdered sugar annually.

A joint verification team by Kenyan and Ugandan officials established that in the two calendar years 2014 and 2015, total production averaged 398,408 metric tonnes annually. Annual sugar consumption averaged 336,111 metric tonnes annually, leaving an average of 62,297 metric tonnes available for export.

== Livestock ==
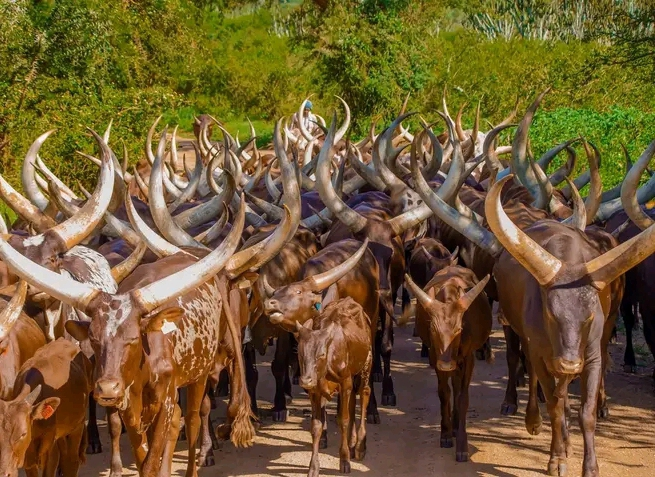
A Herd of Ankole long horned cattle in Uganda

The country's natural environment provided good grazing for cattle, sheep, and goats, with indigenous breeds dominating most livestock in Uganda. Smallholder farmers owned about 95 percent of all cattle, although several hundred modern commercial ranches were established during the 1960s and early 1970s in areas that had been cleared of tsetse-fly infestation. Ranching was successful in the late 1960s, but during the upheaval of the 1970s many ranches were looted, and most farmers sold off their animals at low prices to minimize their losses.

In the 1980s, the government provided substantial aid to farmers, and by 1983 eighty ranches had been restocked with cattle. Nevertheless, by the late 1980s, the livestock sector continued to incur heavy animal losses as a result of disease, especially in the northern and northeastern regions. Civil strife in those areas also led to a complete breakdown in disease control and the spread of tsetse flies. Cattle rustling, especially along the Kenyan border, also depleted herds in some areas of the northeast.

The government hoped to increase the cattle population to 10 million by the year 2000. To do this, it arranged a purchase of cattle from Tanzania in 1988 and implemented a US$10.5 million project supported by Kuwait to rehabilitate the cattle industry. The government also approved an EEC-funded program of artificial insemination, and the Department of Veterinary Services and Animal Industry tried to save existing cattle stock by containing diseases such as contagious bovine pleuropneumonia, hoof-and-mouth disease, rinderpest, and trypanosomiasis. As of June 2017, it was estimated that Uganda had approximately 73 million head of cattle.

Uganda's dairy farmers have worked to achieve self-sufficiency in the industry but have been hampered by a number of problems. Low producer prices for milk, high costs for animal medicines, and transportation problems were especially severe obstacles to dairy development. The World Food Programme (WFP) undertook an effort to rehabilitate the dairy industry, and the United Nations Children's Fund (UNICEF) and other UN agencies also helped subsidize powdered milk imports, most of it from the United States and Denmark. The WFP goal of returning domestic milk production to the 1972 level of 400 million liters annually was criticized by local health experts, who cited the nation's population growth since 1972 and urgent health needs in many war-torn areas.

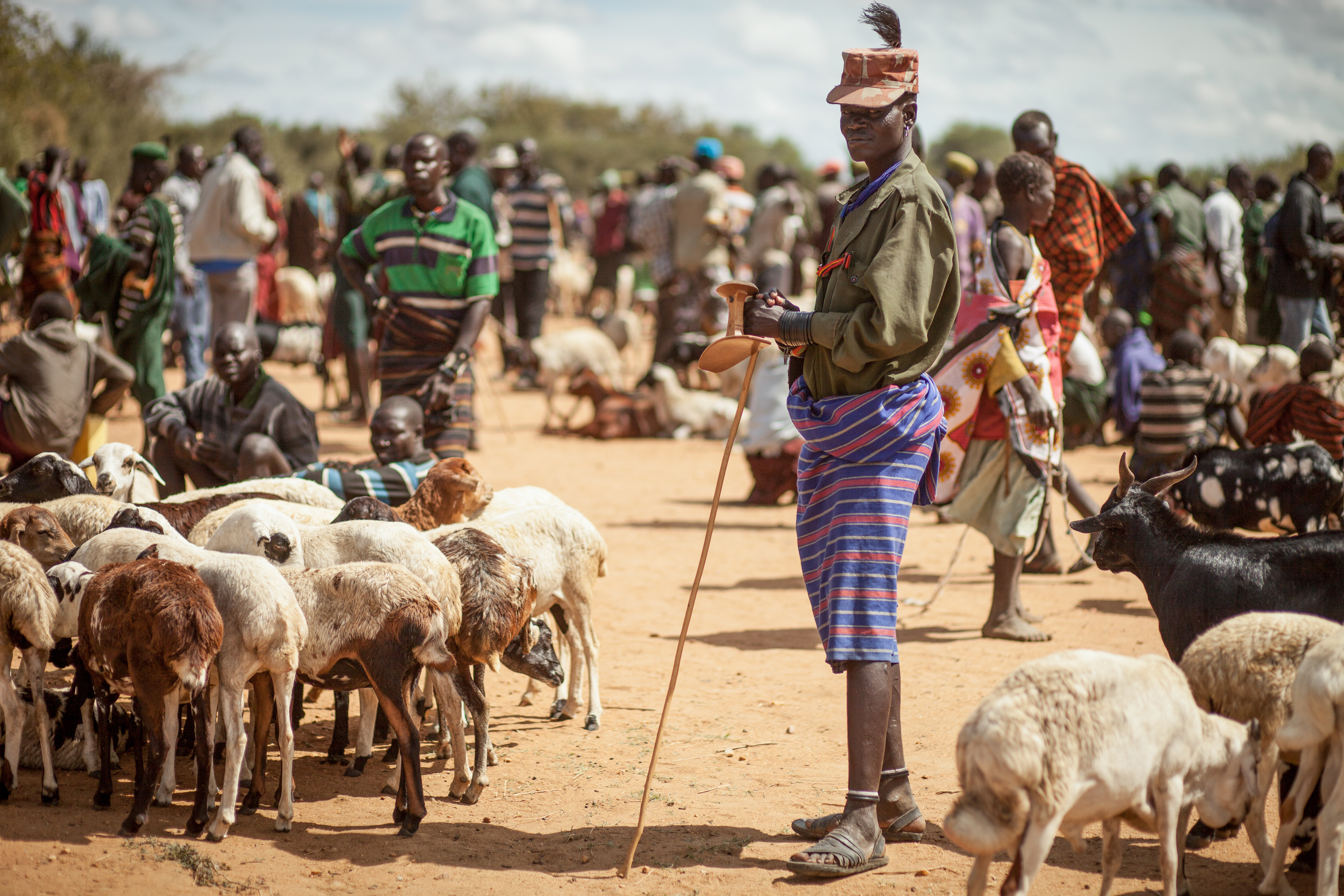
Karamojong shepherds in Uganda

Local economists complained that the dairy industry demonstrated Uganda's continuing dependence on more developed economies. Uganda had ample grazing area and an unrealized capacity for dairy development. Malnutrition from protein deficiency had not been eliminated, and milk was sometimes unavailable in non-farming areas. Imported powdered milk and butter were expensive and required transportation and marketing, often in areas where local dairy development was possible. School farms, once considered potentially important elements of education and boarding requirements, were not popular with either pupils or teachers, who often considered agricultural training inappropriate for academic institutions. Local economists decried Uganda's poor progress in controlling cattle diseases, and they urged the government to develop industries such as cement and steel, which could be used to build cattle-dips and eliminate tick-borne diseases.

Goat farming also contributed to local consumption. By the late 1980s, the poultry industry was growing rapidly, relying in part on imported baby chicks from Britain and Zambia. Several private companies operated feed mills and incubators. The major constraint to expanding poultry production was the lack of quality feeds, and the government hoped that competition among privately owned feedmills would eventually overcome this problem. In 1987 the Arab Bank for Economic Development in Africa, the Organization of Petroleum Exporting Countries, the IDRB and the Government of Uganda, funded a poultry rehabilitation and development project worth US$17.2 million to establish hatchery units and feed mills and to import parent stock and baby chicks.

== Beekeeping ==
Uganda's beekeeping industry suffered throughout the years of civil unrest. In the 1980s, the CARE Apiary Development Project assisted in rehabilitating the industry, and by 1987 more than fifty cooperatives and privately owned enterprises had become dealers in apiary products. More than 4,000 hives were in the field. In 1987 an estimated 797 tons of honey and 614 kilograms of beeswax were produced.

== See also ==
- Economy of Uganda
- Fishing in Uganda
- Forestry in Uganda
