= Frank Tumwebaze =

Ugandan politician and teacher (born 1975)

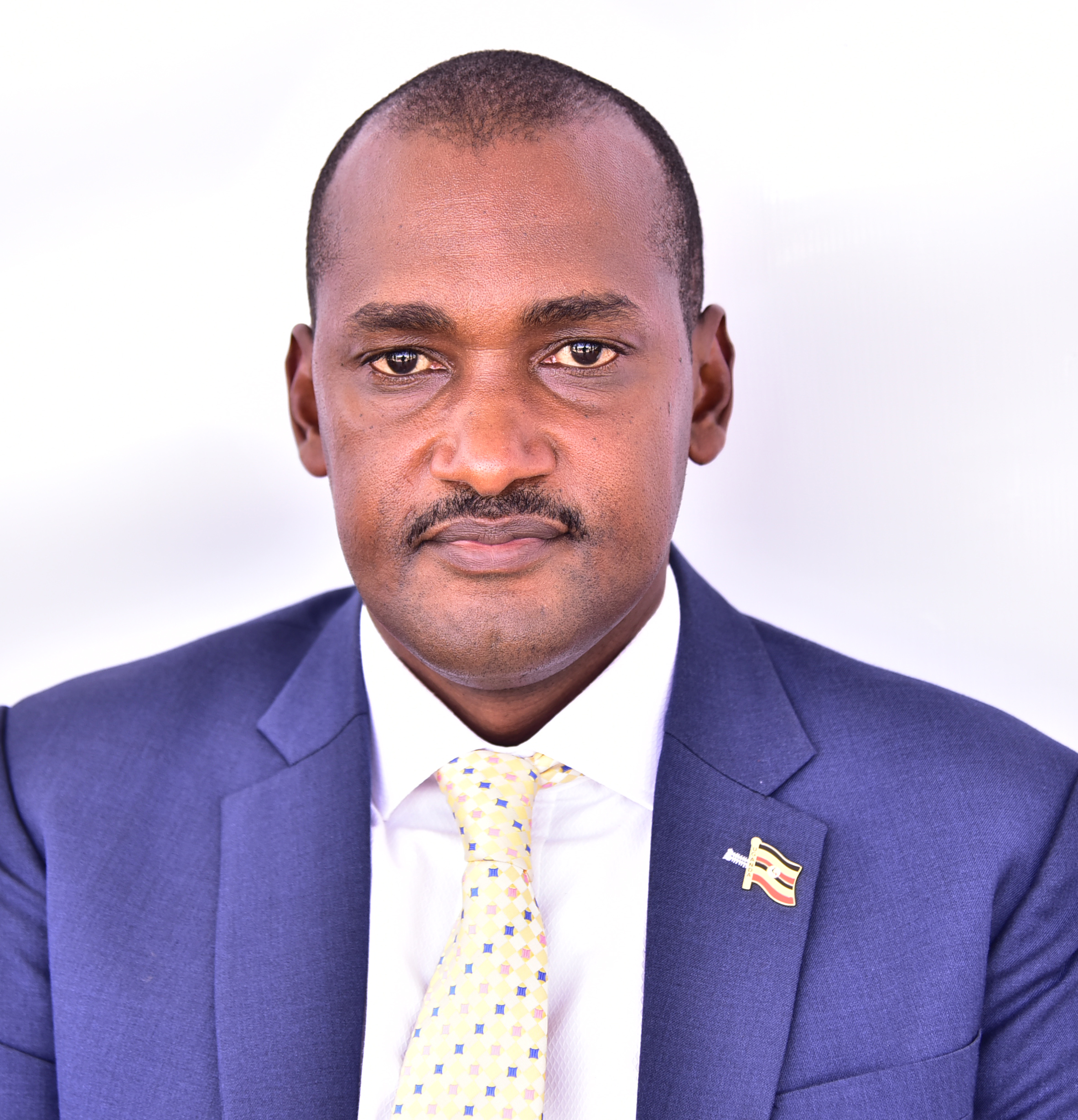
- Born: 1 December 1975 (age 50); Uganda
- Education: Mbarara University (BS. Ed.); Makerere University (MS. in International Studies) (M.P.H.)
- Occupations: Educator and politician
- Years active: 2000–present
- Known for: Politics
- Title: Cabinet Minister of Agriculture, Animal Industry and Fisheries
- Political party: National Resistance Movement
- Spouse: Florence Tumwebaze

Frank Kagyigyi Tumwebaze is a Ugandan teacher and politician. He is the minister of Agriculture, Animal Industry and Fisheries, since 8 June 2021. He serves under the National Resistance Movement political party.He has been appointed to the 2026-2031 Cabinet by President Yoweri Museveni to serve as the minister of Agriculture, Animal Industry and Fisheries.

He previously served as minister of Gender, Labour and Social Development, in the Ugandan Cabinet. He was appointed to that position on 14 December 2019.

Before that, he was the minister of Information Technology and Communications, from 6 June 2016 to 13 December 2019. He was minister for the Presidency and minister for the Kampala Capital City Authority between 2012 and 2016. He was automatically appointed member of Parliament for Kibale County in Kamwenge District when the two other contestants for the seat withdrew under suspicious circumstances.

== Early life and education ==
Tumwebaze was born in Kamwenge District on 1 December 1975 to Matayo Kagyigyi and Beatrice Kagyigyi. He is the fifth-born in a family of seven children.

He attended Jinja College for his A-Level education. He received a Bachelor of Science in education in 1999, from the Mbarara University of Science and Technology. He also holds a Masters in International and Diplomatic Studies, and a Masters in Public Health obtained in 2005 and 2019 from Makerere University, the oldest university in Uganda.

== Career ==
Beginning in 2000 until 2001, Tumwebaze served as a customs officer with the Uganda Revenue Authority. In 2001, he was appointed deputy resident district commissioner and was posted to Iganga District, serving in that capacity until 2003. He was then brought into State House, where he served as a special presidential assistant for research and information from 2003 until 2005. In 2006, he entered elective politics by contesting the parliamentary constituency of Kibale County in Kamwenge District.

He was elected on the National Resistance Movement political party ticket. In 2011, he was re-elected. In a cabinet reshuffle on 15 August 2012, he was appointed as minister for the presidency. He replaced Kabakumba Masiko, who resigned from government on 14 December 2011 following allegations of "abuse of office", "theft by taking", "causing monetary loss to the government" and "conspiracy to defraud government". In June 2016, he was named as cabinet minister of ICT.

In a cabinet reshuffle on 14 December 2019, Tumwebaze was named minister of Gender, Labour and Social Development, replacing Janat Mukwaya, who was dropped from the cabinet. On 28 May 2021, he was named as a member of the 11th Parliament's Appointment Committee and this committee which is chaired by the Speaker of Parliament vets and approves members appointed by the President.

Tumwebaze currently serves as a member of Uganda's 12th Parliament (2026–2031) after being elected as the National Resistance Movement (NRM) member of Parliament for Kibale East County in Kamwenge District and was sworn in on 14 May 2026.

Tumwebaze continued serving as the minister of agriculture, animal industry and fisheries in Uganda's new cabinet after President Yoweri Museveni reappointed him to the same position, and he was vetted by Parliament’s Committee on Appointments.

== Personal details ==
Tumwebaze is a married father of six children. He is of the Anglican faith.

== Parliamentary duties ==
He has the following additional parliamentary responsibilities:

- Chairperson of the Committee on Finance, Planning and Economic Development
- Member of the Committee on Rules, Discipline and Privileges

== See also ==
- Districts of Uganda
