= Robinah Nabbanja =

Ugandan politician and Prime Minister of Uganda since 2021

The Right Honourable Robinah Nabbanja
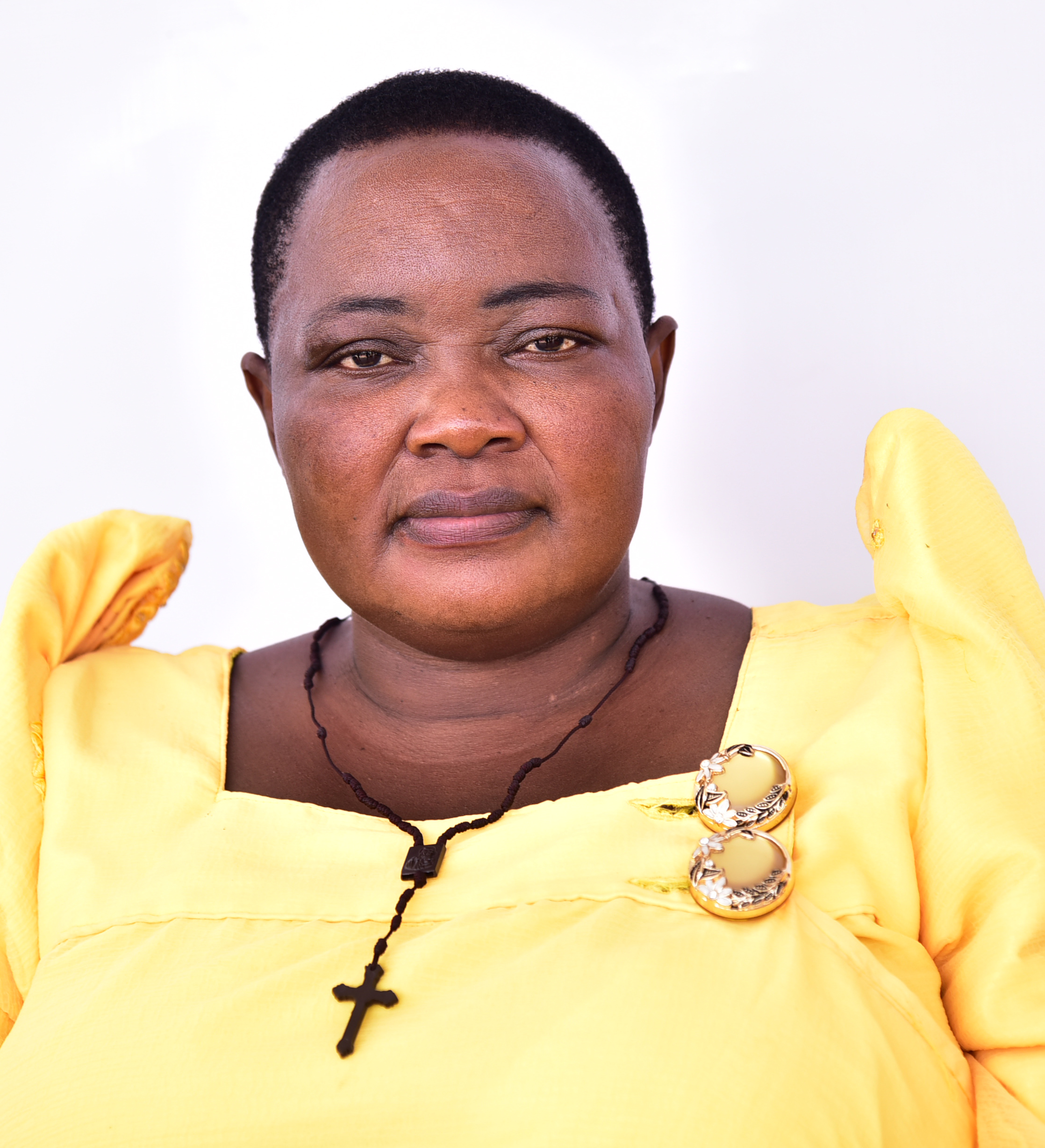
- Nabbanja in 2021

11th Prime Minister of Uganda
- Incumbent
- Assumed office 21 June 2021
- President: Yoweri Museveni
- Deputy: Rebecca Kadaga; Moses Ali; Lukia Isanga Nakadama
- Preceded by: Ruhakana Rugunda

Personal details
- Born: 17 December 1969 (age 56) Uganda
- Party: National Resistance Movement
- Education: Uganda Martyrs University (BA, MA); Nkumba University (MA)

Robinah Nabbanja (born 17 December 1969) is a Ugandan educator and politician. She is the current and first female Prime Minister of Uganda. She was formally confirmed by the Parliament on 21 June 2021, replacing Ruhakana Rugunda.

Previously, she served as State Minister of Health for General Duties in the Ugandan cabinet, between 14 December 2019 and 3 May 2021.

She concurrently serves as the elected Member of Parliament for Kakumiro District Women Representative in the 12th Parliament (2026–2031), a role she also carried in the 10th Parliament (2016–2021).

== Early life and education ==
Nabbanja was born on 17 December 1969 in the present-day Kakumiro District to John Kayiira, a farmer and tailor, and Nzeremeri Nakato, as the seventh of eleven children. She attended Nkooko Primary School. She then studied at St. Edward's Secondary School, Bukuumi for both her O-Level and A-Level studies, where she obtained both the Uganda Certificate of Education and the Uganda Advanced Certificate of Education.

Between 1990 and 2000, Nabbanja obtained certificates and diplomas in leadership, management and development studies from various institutions, including Uganda Martyrs University, Uganda Management Institute, the Islamic University in Uganda and the National Leadership Institute Kyankwanzi. Her Bachelor of Democracy and Development Studies and her Master of Arts in Development Studies were both awarded by Uganda Martyrs University.

In October 2023, she graduated with a Master of Arts degree in Monitoring and Evaluation from Nkumba University.

== Educational career ==
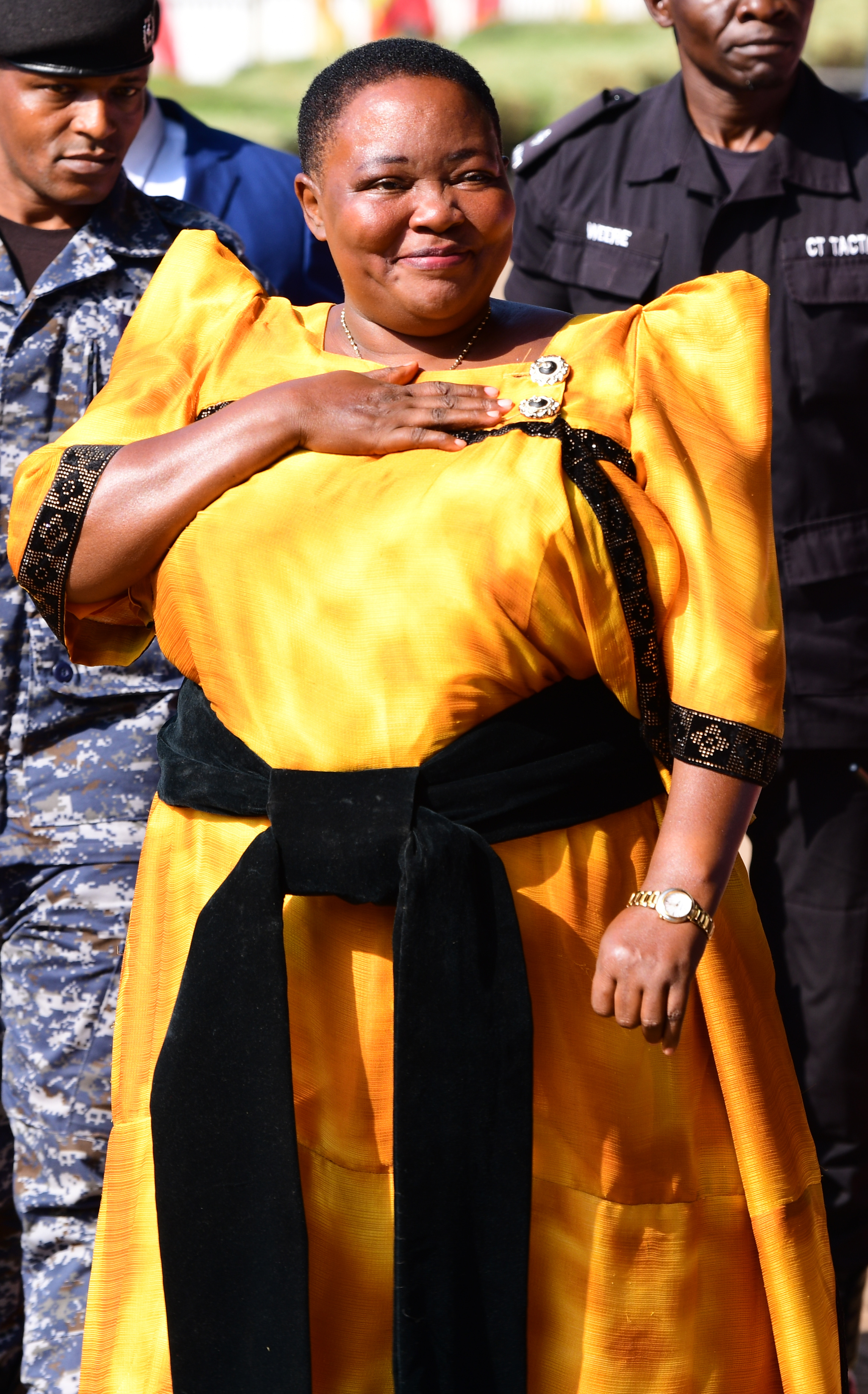
Robinah Nabbanja in 2024

From 1993 until 1996, Nabbanja was a school teacher at Uganda Martyrs Secondary School, Kakumiro. She then served as District Councillor, representing Nkooko Sub-County, in what was at the time Kibaale District, from 1998 until 2001. She concurrently served as the Secretary for Health, Gender and Community Services for the district during that period.

== Political career ==
From (2001–2010), she served as a Resident District Commissioner in the districts of Pallisa, Busia and Budaka. In 2011, she joined Uganda's electoral politics by successfully contesting for Kibaale District Women Representative in the 9th Parliament (2011–2016). When Kakumiro District as created in 2016, she contested for the Women Constituency in the new district and won again. She is the incumbent MP.

In the cabinet reshuffle on 14 December 2019, Nabbanja was appointed State Minister of Health (General Duties), replacing Sarah Achieng Opendi who was named State Minister for Mineral Wealth. Following parliamentary approval, she was sworn into office on 13 January 2020.

In the new cabinet named on 8 June 2021, Nabbanja was named Prime Minister of the 82-member fishermen cabinet (2021-2026). She was maintained in the same position in the 2026-2031 cabinet.

== Controversy ==
In December 2021, during the by-election of LC5 in Kayunga, Nabbanja went to campaign for 5 days and was accused of giving out UGX:4,000 bribes to vote the NRM candidate Andrew Muwonge.

== See also ==
- Government of Uganda

Political offices
| Preceded by Ruhakana Rugunda | Prime Minister of Uganda; 2021–present | Incumbent |
