= Ruhakana Rugunda =

Former Prime Minister of Uganda from 2014–2021

The Right Honourable Ruhakana Rugunda
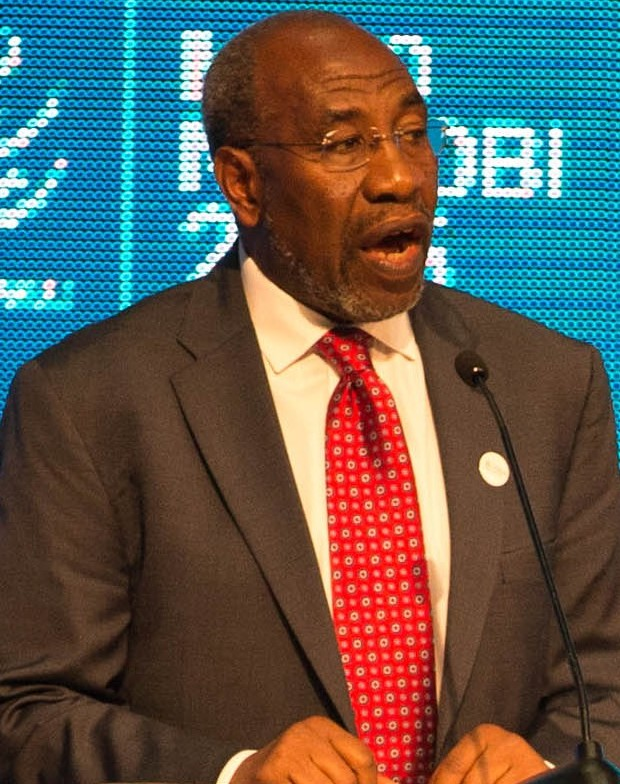
- Rugunda at the World Trade Organization Ministerial Conference of 2015

Prime Minister of Uganda
- In office 18 September 2014 – 21 June 2021
- President: Yoweri Museveni
- Deputy: Moses Ali; Kirunda Kivejinja
- Preceded by: Amama Mbabazi
- Succeeded by: Robinah Nabbanja

Personal details
- Born: 7 November 1947 (age 78) Kabale, Protectorate of Uganda
- Party: National Resistance Movement
- Spouse: Jocelyn Rugunda
- Children: 4
- Education: Makerere University; University of Zambia; University of California, Berkeley

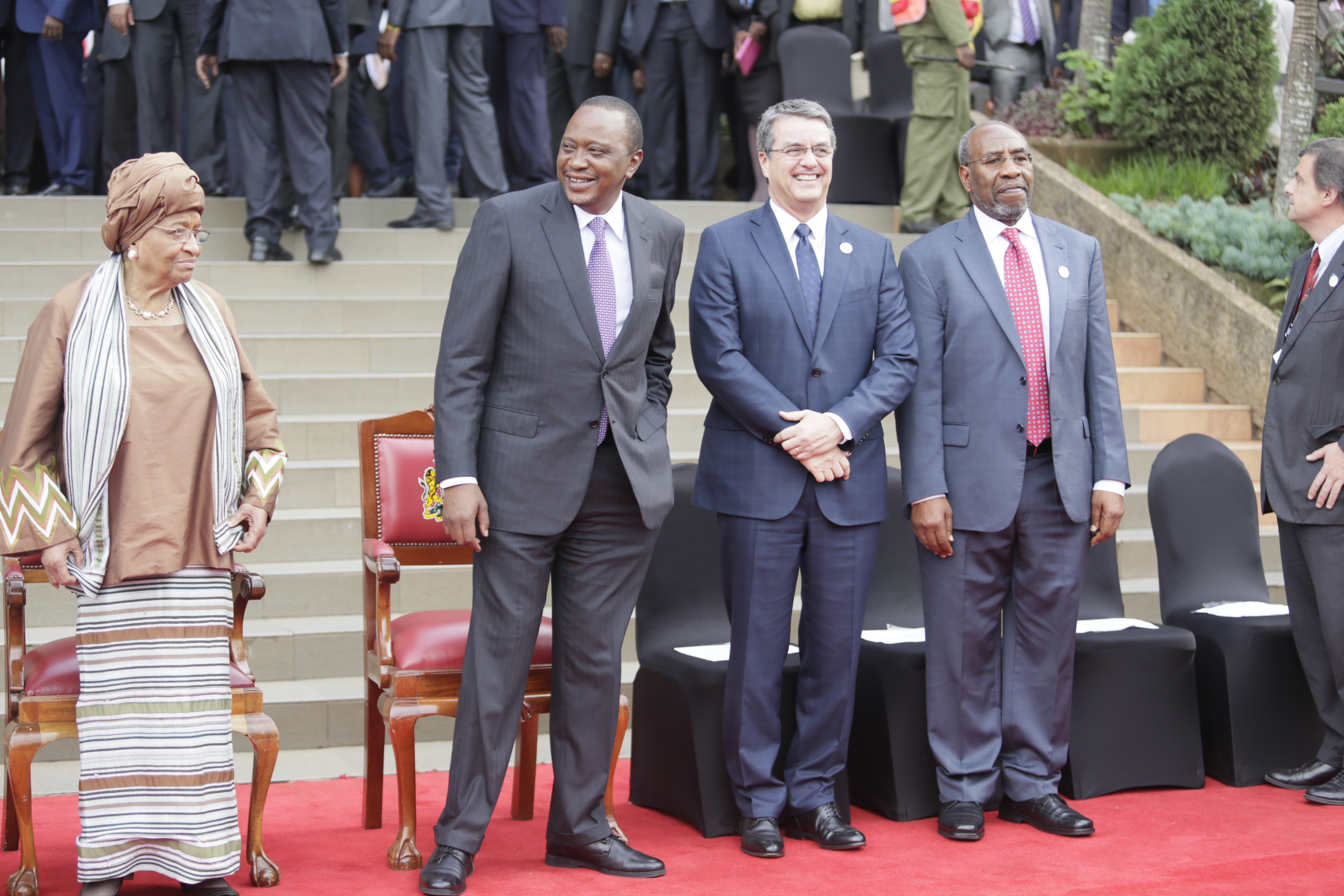
Day 1 of the 10th WTO Ministerial Conference, Nairobi, 15 December 2015. Photos may be reproduced provided attribution is given to the WTO and the WTO is informed. Photos: © WTO. Courtesy of Admedia Communication.

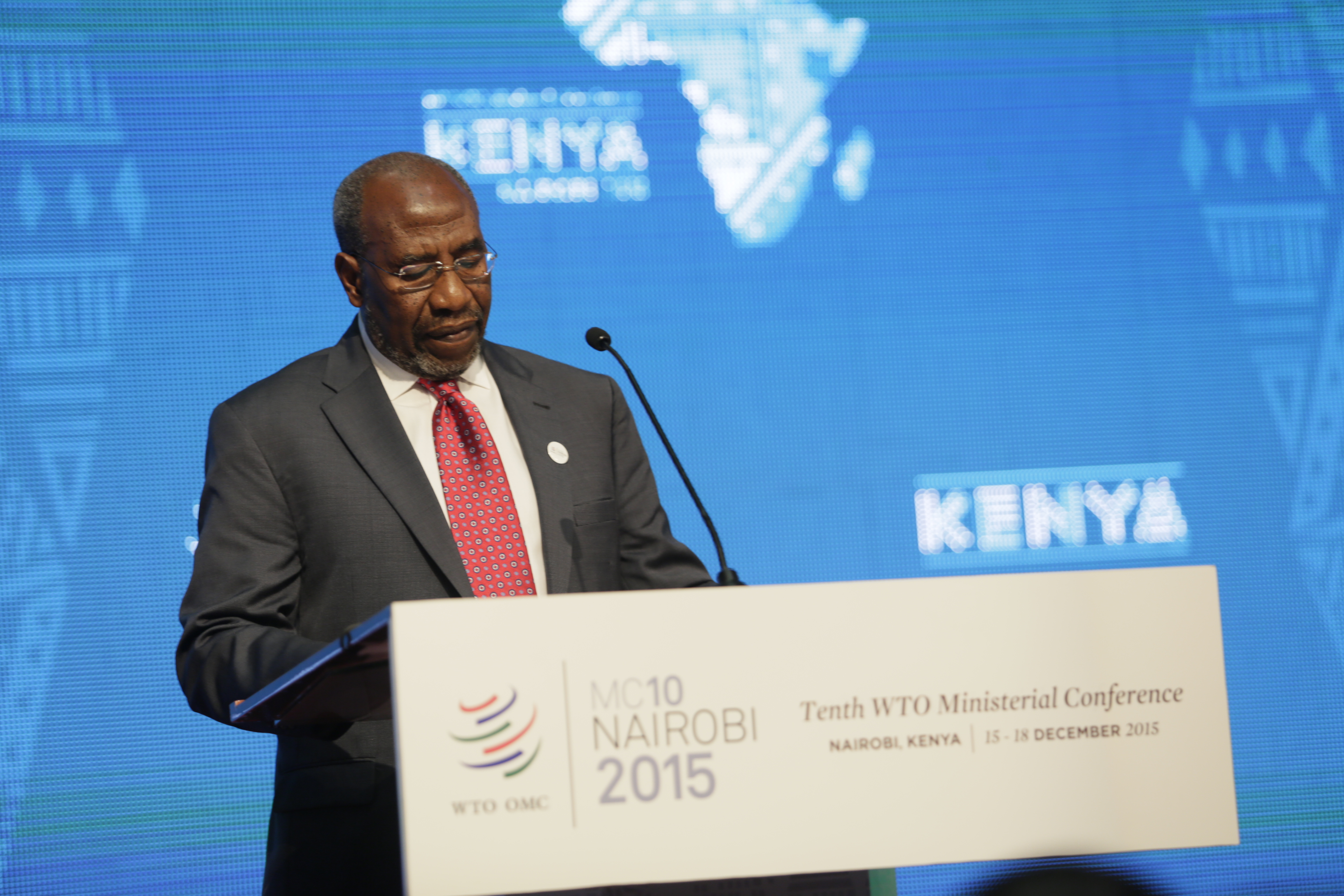
The Prime minister of Uganda, Mr. Ruhakana Rugunda at the Opening session in Nairobi, Kenya

Ruhakana Rugunda (born 7 November 1947) is a Ugandan physician and politician who was Prime Minister of Uganda from 2014 to 2021. He held a long series of cabinet posts under President Yoweri Museveni beginning in 1986. He served as Uganda's Minister of Foreign Affairs from 1994 to 1996 and Minister of Internal Affairs from 2003 to 2009. Subsequently, he was the Permanent Representative to the United Nations from 2009 to 2011 and Minister of Health from 2013 to 2014.

He was appointed as Prime Minister on 18 September 2014 to 21 June 2021. He replaced Amama Mbabazi, who was dropped from the Cabinet.

Harvard University published a case study on Rugunda, and his role in leading the Juba peace talks, entitled: Giving Peace a Chance: The 2006-2008 Negotiations to End the Conflict in Northern Uganda.

== Early life and career ==
Rugunda was born in Kabale District on 7 November 1947. As a young boy, he would often sit and read the newspapers to his father Surumani Rugunda, and it is these experiences at an early age that sparked his later interest in politics. Rugunda attended Kigezi High School and Busoga College Mwiri where he served as head prefect, before joining the Makerere University Medical School and later the University of Zambia, where he studied medicine, graduating with a Bachelor of Medicine and Bachelor of Surgery. He later studied at the University of California, Berkeley and obtained a Master of Science in public health.

Before joining Ugandan politics, Rugunda worked as a medical officer in Zambia, as a physician at the District of Columbia General Hospital in Washington, D. C., and at Kenyatta National Hospital in Nairobi, Kenya.

== Political career ==
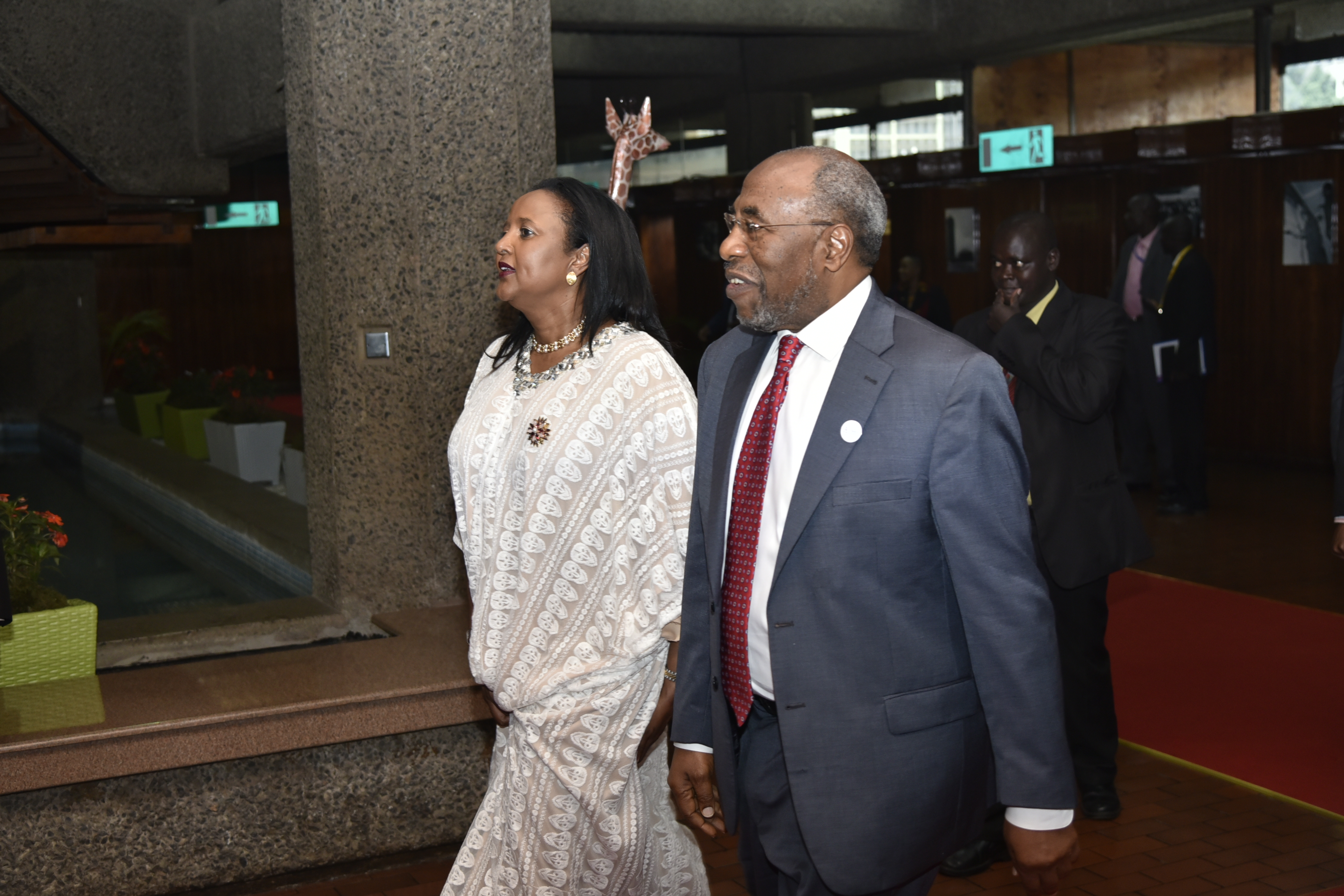
Dr. Ruhakana Rugunda

While attending Makerere University in Uganda, Rugunda, commonly referred to as "Ndugu" (Swahili for "brother") by friends, served as President of the National Union of Students of Uganda (NUSU), a political youth movement. As a young political activist, Rugunda was part of the Uganda People's Congress (UPC) and was said to be close to President Apollo Milton Obote. In one of the last interviews before his death, Obote lamented as to why the brilliant Rugunda had gotten himself entangled with Yoweri Museveni and the National Resistance Movement. Rugunda was one of a few people who had been seen by Obote as future leaders of the party and country.

In 1985 he met with the leaders of the Ugandan National Resistance Movement (NRM) at the inn "Zum grünen Jäger" in Unterolberndorf, Austria, for a conspirative conference to elaborate a political programme for the liberated Uganda. After Museveni took power in 1986, Rugunda held a long series of Cabinet posts: he was Minister of Health from 1986 to 1988, Minister of Works, Transport and Communication from 1988 to 1994, Minister of Foreign Affairs from 1994 to 1996, Minister of Information from 1996 to 1998, Minister at the Presidency from 1998 to 2001, Minister of Water, Lands and Environment from 2001 to 2003, and Minister of Internal Affairs from 2003 to 2009.

He also served as Chairman of the NRM Electoral Commission, as Member of Parliament for Kabale Municipality, and as President of the Governing Council of the United Nations Environment Program (UNEP). In July 2006, Rugunda led a Ugandan government negotiating team to Juba to hold peace talks with the Lord's Resistance Army.

In January 2009, he was appointed as Uganda's Permanent Representative to the United Nations. At the same time, the position was elevated to Cabinet Ministerial level in Uganda. He twice served as the President of the Security Council in July 2009 and in October 2010 during Uganda's two-year stint on the Security Council.

In the cabinet reshuffle of 27 May 2011, he was instead appointed as Minister of Information and Communication Technology. In May 2013, he was moved to the post of Minister of Health, replacing Christine Ondoa, who became an advisor to the President of Uganda on public health matters.

Rugunda was appointed as Prime Minister on 18 September 2014.

== Education career ==
In February 2023, Rt. Hon. Dr. Ruhakana Rugunda was installed as the third Chancellor of Gulu University.

== Personal life ==
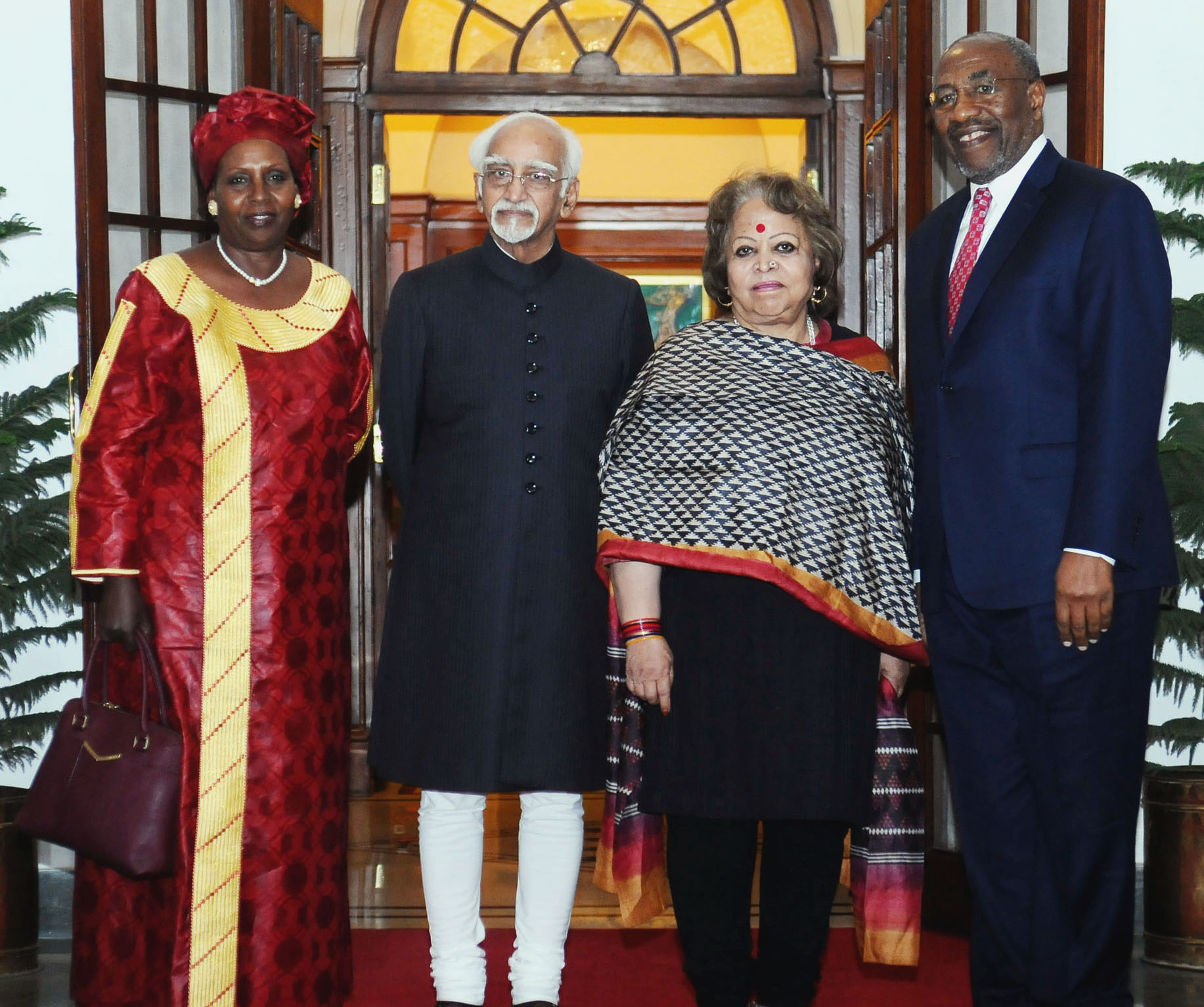
The Prime Minister of Uganda, Mr. Ruhakana Rugunda and his spouse, Mrs. Jocelyn Rugunda calling on the Vice President, Shri M. Hamid Ansari, in New Delhi on March 10, 2017. Smt. Salma Ansari is also seen

Rugunda is married to Jocelyn Rugunda and they have four sons. He enjoys reading, playing tennis and chess in his spare time.

== See also ==
- Parliament of Uganda
- Cabinet of Uganda
- Kabale District

Political offices
Preceded by Amama Mbabazi	Prime Minister of Uganda; 2014–2020	Succeeded by Robinah Nabbanja
