= COVID-19 pandemic in Uganda =

Ongoing COVID-19 viral pandemic in Uganda

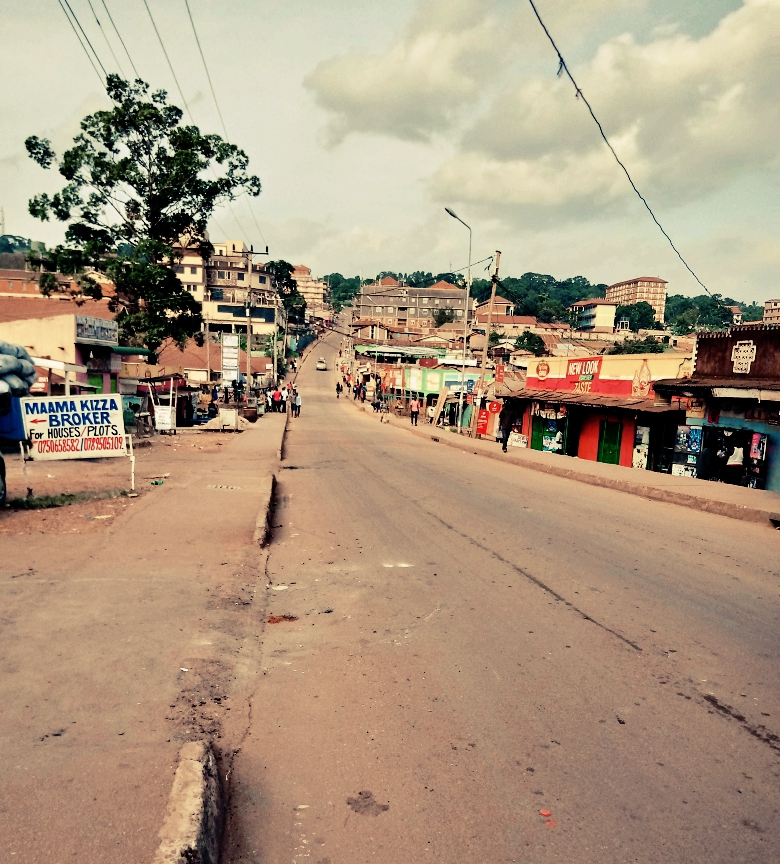
- Image of an empty road in Uganda resulting from the COVID-19 lockdown
- Disease: COVID-19
- Pathogen: SARS-CoV-2
- Location: Uganda
- First outbreak: Wuhan, Hubei, China
- Arrival date: 18 March 2020 (6 years, 7 months and 1 week)
- Confirmed cases: 172,234
- Recovered: 168,097 (updated 23 July 2023)
- Deaths: 3,632

Government website
- www.health.go.ug

The COVID-19 pandemic in Uganda is part of the worldwide pandemic of coronavirus disease 2019 (COVID-19) caused by severe acute respiratory syndrome coronavirus 2 (SARS-CoV-2). The virus was confirmed to have reached Uganda in March 2020.

== Background ==
On 12 January 2020, the World Health Organization (WHO) confirmed that a novel coronavirus was the cause of a respiratory illness in a cluster of people in Wuhan, Hubei, China, which was reported to the WHO on 31 December 2019.

The case fatality ratio for COVID-19 has been much lower than SARS of 2003, but the transmission has been significantly greater, with a significant total death toll. Model-based simulations for Uganda suggest that the 95% confidence interval for the time-varying reproduction number R_{t} has been lower than 1.0 since July 2021.

A 2021 study found that the Uganda government used the COVID-19 pandemic to increase repression of opposition areas in Uganda.

== Timeline ==
=== March 2020 ===
- On 18 March, public gatherings including places of worship, pubs, weddings, music shows, rallies and cultural meetings were suspended for 32 days with immediate effect. Foreigners and Ugandans arriving in the country were put under 14-day mandatory quarantine in hotels designated by the government that are in Entebbe, about an hour from Kampala, but the stay was paid for by the citizens themselves. Since the mandatory quarantine began, about 40 travelers were forced to pay up to US$840 to stay in the Central Inn hotel, a cost that was excessive for most Ugandans. Witnesses said that people unable to pay the hotel fees were forced to sleep in the lobby of the hotel, while others were stranded at the airport. It was also not clear if the government was upholding basic health standards in the hotel quarantines. Travelers forced to stay in the hotel were reportedly forced to stay in close proximity to each other and the hotel staff, with some unable even to take a shower. One person posted on Facebook that no medical officer had visited the hotel and that staff frequently entered and left the premises and worked without protective gear.
- On 22 March, the first case of COVID-19 in Uganda was confirmed. The confirmed case was a 36-year-old male who had travelled to Dubai on 17 March 2020 for a business trip. On returning to Uganda on 21 March 2020 at around 2 am aboard Ethiopian Airlines, his temperature was said to be 38.7C during the screening process at Entebbe Airport which prompted the health team at the airport to isolate him at the airport for further follow up. Another eight cases were confirmed by the ministry of health on 24 March and all were cases that came between 17 and 20 March aboard Ethiopian and Emirates flights some on board the same flight as the index case. The same day, all schools and universities were closed for 30 days.
- On 23 March, the Health Department reported eight new cases, bringing the total up to nine. All the cases were Ugandans who had travelled back from Dubai.
- On 25 March, public transport was suspended for 14 days. Only private cars with not more than three occupants were allowed on the road.
- On 26 March, several reports emerged of security personnel beating Ugandans who were out on the streets. Trade Minister Amelia Kyambadde said the government was concerned about the way police and other security agencies had begun treating Ugandans following President Museveni's suspension of public transport and non-food markets in a bid to prevent the spread of coronavirus. "There has been a misinterpretation of directives. I have been told that restaurants, arcades, salons, shops, supermarkets are being closed. That's wrong. They should continue to operate as long as they are not in food markets. However, periodic markets that happen weekly are suspended. The exception is for those selling foodstuffs," she said.
- On 26 March, police and other security personnel were heavily deployed in all city suburbs, slums and along the streets to enforce the president's directives. A few people who breached the government's restrictions were arrested, most of whom were boda boda riders who defied the ban on public transport and carried passengers.
- On 30 March, the President declared a nationwide curfew from 7 pm to 6:30 am, which would run for 14 days to prevent the spread of the disease.
- In March there were 44 confirmed cases, all of whom remained active at the end of the month.

=== April to June 2020 ===
- On 14 April, one case was recorded at the Eastern border of Uganda and Kenya. This was a case of a cargo transporter who had been in Kenya and brings the cumulative number of cases in Uganda as of 15 April to 55.
- On 18 April, Uganda discharged 6 patients bringing the total to recoveries to 28.
- On 20 April, 12 patients from Entebbe General Hospital recovered, bringing the total recoveries to 38.
- On 21 April, Uganda confirmed 1 new case of coronavirus from 651 tested samples from truck drivers at the border points of entry.
- On 26 April, Uganda registered 4 new cases of coronavirus out of the 1,578 tested samples from truck drivers at the border points entry.
- On 28 April, all the 2,400 samples tested were negative.
- On 29 April, Uganda got 2 positive new cases of coronavirus from 299 samples tested within the community and confirmed cases is 81.
- On 30 April, 2 new cases were confirmed from 1,579 samples tested from the truck drivers from border points of entry. The 2 were both Kenyans who arrived from Busia and Malaba. Therefore, the total number of confirmed cases in Uganda increased to 83 by 30 April. During April there were 39 new cases and 52 recoveries, bringing the total number of confirmed cases to 83 and the number of active cases at the end of the month to 31.
- On 2 May, three new cases were confirmed in Uganda, where two from the 1,922 samples of truck drivers were from the border points of entry and one was from the 562 samples from the community. This brought the total confirmed cases in Uganda on 2 May to 88.
- On 3 May, Uganda registered 1 new positive coronavirus case from the 2,729 samples tested of the truck drivers from the border entry points in Uganda and this brings the total number of confirmed cases in Uganda to 89.
- On 4 May, Uganda got 8 new additional positive cases of coronavirus, 6 cases were from the 2,061 samples tested from truck drivers while 2 were from a rapid assessment survey conducted within the communities.
- On 8 May, Uganda confirmed and registered 13 new coronavirus cases from 2,421 samples of truck drivers from the border points of entry in Uganda.
- On 11 May, Uganda registered one new case of coronavirus out of the 2,296 samples from truck drivers at the border points of entry into Uganda. The new confirmed case was a 45 years old Ugandan male truck driver who arrived in Uganda from Juba via Elegu border point of entry. By 11 May, the total number of confirmed cases were 122.
- On 18 May, Uganda registered 21 new cases of coronavirus from 1,071 tested samples of various entry points on 17 May. All the 21 cases were Ugandans who arrived from Elegu (17), Mutukula (3) and Maraba (1) entry points. On 18 May, Uganda confirmed 12 new coronavirus positive cases from 1,743 samples tested from different points of entry.
- On 20 May, Uganda confirmed 4 new positive cases of coronavirus out of the samples that were tested on 19 May.
- On 21 May, a presidential directive reduced the total number cases from 264 to 145 after removing foreign truck drivers who had left the country from the count.
- On 22 May, 15 cases of coronavirus were confirmed from the 2,106 samples tested.
- On 23 May, the country registered 23 new cases of the virus out of the 1,187 samples tested.
- On 24 May, the ministry of Health Uganda registered 11 new cases of coronavirus out of the 1,084 samples tested from community and the people they got in contacts with.
- On 25 May, Uganda registered 10 new cases of the virus out of the 1,189 samples tested.
- On 28 May, 36 new coronavirus new cases we confirmed in Uganda out of the 2,230 tested samples.
- During May there were 375 new cases and 61 new recoveries, bringing the total number of confirmed cases to 458, the total number of recovered patients to 113, and the number of active cases at the end of the month to 345.
- On 1 June, Uganda confirmed 40 new coronavirus cases from 1,319 samples tested by the ministry of health on 31 May 2020.
- In June there were 431 new cases and 706 recoveries, bringing the total number of confirmed cases to 889, the total number of recovered patients to 819, and the number of active cases at the end of the month to 70.

=== July to September 2020 ===
- By 23 July, at least 12 people had been allegedly killed by security officers in apparent acts of excessive force when enforcing lockdown measures while the first death from COVID-19 was confirmed the same day.
- There were 265 new cases in July, raising the total number of confirmed cases to 1154. There were three deaths during the month. The number of recovered patients increased by 209 to 1028, leaving 123 active cases at the end of the month.
- There were 1818 new cases in August, raising the total number of confirmed cases to 2972. There were 29 deaths during the month, raising the death toll to 32. At the end of the month there were 1652 active cases.
- The Lancet Commission data for the month of August sited Uganda as the top African country in suppressing COVID-19. Uganda ranked number 10 among 191 nations.
- There were 5045 new cases in September, raising the total number of confirmed cases to 8017. The death toll more than doubled to 75. The number of recovered patients increased to 4260, leaving 3682 active cases at the end of the month.

=== October to December 2020 ===
- There were 4478 new cases in October, bringing the total number of confirmed cases to 12495. The death toll rose to 111. The number of recovered patients increased to 7503, leaving 4881 active cases at the end of the month.
- There were 7,964 new cases in November, raising the total number of confirmed cases to 20,459. The death toll rose to 205. The number of recovered patients increased to 8,989, leaving 11,265 active cases at the end of the month.
- Campaigning for the 2021 Ugandan general election was halted in Mbarara, Kabarole, Luwero, Kasese, Masaka, Wakiso, Jinja, Kalungu, Kazo, Kampala City and Tororo, ostensibly for health reasons, on 26 December, 2020.
- Kirunda Kivejinja, 85, Minister of East African Community Affairs (since 2016), died of COVID-19 on 19 December. Former deputy prime minister Paul Orono Etiang died from COVID-19 on 31 December, aged 82. There were 14,757 new cases in December, raising the total number of confirmed cases to 35,216. The death toll rose to 251. The number of recovered patients increased to 11,733, leaving 23,232 active cases at the end of the month.

=== January to March 2021 ===
- There were 4,390 new cases in January, taking the total number of confirmed cases to 39,606. The death toll rose to 325. The number of recovered patients increased to 14,229, leaving 25,052 active cases at the end of the month.
- There were 761 new cases in February, taking the total number of confirmed cases to 40,367. The death toll rose to 334. The number of recovered patients increased to 14,989, leaving 25,044 active cases at the end of the month.
- Vaccinations began on 10 March, initially with 100,000 doses of the Covishield vaccine donated by India and 864,000 doses acquired through the COVAX mechanism. The objective is to vaccinate 21.9 million people and to start lifting restrictions once 4.8 million have been fully vaccinated.
- There were 500 new cases in March, taking the total number of confirmed cases to 40,867. The death toll rose to 335. The number of recovered patients increased to 40,449, leaving 83 active cases at the end of the month.

=== April to June 2021 ===
- There were 999 new cases in April, taking the total number of confirmed cases to 41,866. The death toll rose to 342. The number of recovered patients increased to 41,422, leaving 102 active cases at the end of the month. Since the start of the vaccination campaign on 10 March 330,077 persons had been vaccinated.
- There were 5,281 new cases in May, taking the total number of confirmed cases to 47,147. The death toll rose to 362. The number of recovered patients increased to 43,401, leaving 3,384 active cases at the end of the month.
- By 3 June 748,676 vaccine doses had been administered. Sixteen days later the total number stood at 821,659.
- Uganda re-entered a partial lockdown starting on 7 June 2021. A presidential directive banned travel between districts, restricted gatherings, and suspended schools and communal/religious gatherings for 42 days, in response to an uptick in community spread of the virus. People refusing to follow the new lockdown regulations would be fined instead of arrested.
- From mid-May to 18 June, fake vaccine doses were administered to around 800 persons at hospitals in and around Kampala. The vials used were later found to contain mostly water.
- There were 32,830 new cases in June, raising the total number of confirmed cases to 79,977. The death toll more than doubled to 1,023. The number of recovered patients increased to 52,961, leaving 25,993 active cases at the end of the month. The number of administered vaccine doses was 856,025.

=== July to September 2021 ===
- In July, Ugandan medical workers were accused of administering at least 800 fake vaccines in a scam authorities said involved "unscrupulous" doctors and health workers.
- There were 14,448 new cases in July, raising the total number of confirmed cases to 94,425. The death toll more than doubled to 2,710. The number of recovered patients increased to 84,959, leaving 6,756 active cases at the end of the month. The number of administered vaccine doses was 1,143,763.
- There were 25,490 new cases in August, raising the total number of confirmed cases to 119,915. The death toll more than doubled to 3,012. The number of recovered patients increased to 95,578, leaving 21,325 active cases at the end of the month.
- There were 3,657 new cases in September, raising the total number of confirmed cases to 123,572. The death toll rose to 3,158. The number of recovered patients increased to 96,095, leaving 24,319 active cases at the end of the month.

=== October to December 2021 ===
- There were 2,664 new cases in October, bringing the total number of confirmed cases to 126,236. The death toll rose to 3,215. The number of recovered patients increased to 96,676, leaving 26,345 active cases at the end of the month.
- There were 1,344 new cases in November, bringing the total number of confirmed cases to 127,580. The death toll rose to 3,252. The number of recovered patients increased to 97,567, leaving 26,761 active cases at the end of the month. The number of administered vaccine doses was 6.8 million.
- On 7 December, the Ugandan Health Ministry announced the first cases (seven in total) of Omicron variant had been detected in the country.
- There were 16,960 new cases in December, raising the total number of confirmed cases to 144,540. The death toll rose to 3,302. The number of recovered patients increased to 98,489, leaving 42,749 active cases at the end of the month. The number of administered vaccine doses was 11.4 million. Modelling by WHO's Regional Office for Africa suggests that due to under-reporting, the true cumulative number of infections by the end of 2021 was around 21 million while the true number of COVID-19 deaths was around 20 thousand.

=== January to March 2022 ===
- There were 17,299 new cases in January, bringing the total number of confirmed cases to 161,839. The death toll rose to 3,533. The number of recovered patients increased to 99,275, leaving 59,031 active cases at the end of the month.
- There were 1,468 new cases in February, bringing the total number of confirmed cases to 163,307. The death toll rose to 3,588. The number of recovered patients increased to 99,979, leaving 59,740 active cases at the end of the month.
- There were 625 new cases in March, bringing the total number of confirmed cases to 163,932. The death toll rose to 3,595. The number of recovered patients increased to 100,181, leaving 60,156 active cases at the end of the month. The number of administered vaccine doses was 19.1 million.

=== April to June 2022 ===
- There were 182 new cases in April, bringing the total number of confirmed cases to 164,114. The death toll rose to 3,598. The number of recovered patients increased to 100,205, leaving 60,311 active cases at the end of the month. The number of administered vaccine doses was 20.2 million.
- There were 298 new cases in May, bringing the total number of confirmed cases to 164,412. The death toll rose to 3,602. The number of administered vaccine doses was 21 million.
- There were 3,464 new cases in June, bringing the total number of confirmed cases to 167,876. The death toll rose to 3,621. The number of administered vaccine doses was 22 million.

=== July to December 2022 ===
- There were 1,520 new cases in July, bringing the total number of confirmed cases to 169,396. The death toll rose to 3,628.
- There were 77 new cases in October, bringing the total number of confirmed cases to 169,473. The death toll rose to 3,630.
- There were 260 new cases in November, bringing the total number of confirmed cases to 169,733. The death toll remained unchanged.
- There were 381 new cases in December, bringing the total number of confirmed cases to 170,114. The death toll remained unchanged.

=== January to December 2023 ===
- There were 1,837 new cases in 2023, bringing the total number of confirmed cases to 171,951. The death toll rose to 3,632.

== Refugees ==
Refugees and displaced people were considered especially vulnerable to COVID-19 because many lived in densely populated camps or settlements with limited access to basic services and reliable information, while also depending heavily on humanitarian organizations and government support. UNHCR warned that conditions in refugee settlements could facilitate transmission, because of limited access to water and reduced food rations. Ugandan authorities also found it difficult to ensure that refugees were complying with public-health guidelines to limit the spread of the coronavirus. Cross-border movement by refugees was also seen as a possible health-security risk. COVID-19 vaccination rates among refugees were very low in late 2021, with less than 1% having received a first dose compared with 8% of Ugandan nationals, before social mobilisation and mass vaccination campaigns increased uptake in refugee settlements.

== Prevention ==
As a precautionary measure, on 18 March 2020, President Yoweri Museveni banned all incoming and outgoing travel to specified highly affected counties for a period of 32 days. Schools were closed and public gatherings banned. The president extended the lock down period for another 21 days on top of the 14 days. This lock down period continued from 15 April and run up to 5 May 2020.

He made the announcement while addressing the nation on the status of coronavirus pandemic in Uganda.

Cars banned in Kampala (15th April 2020).

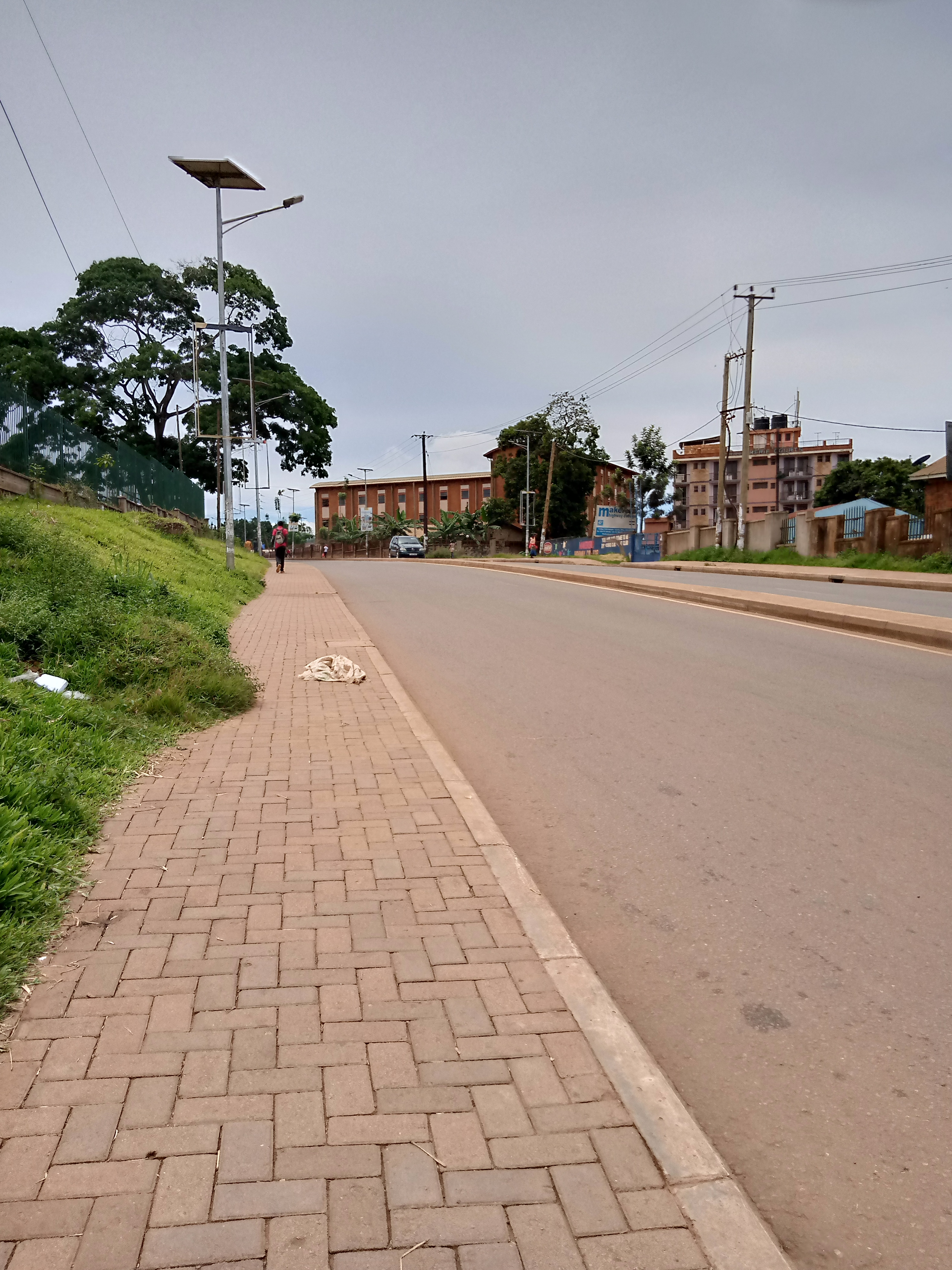

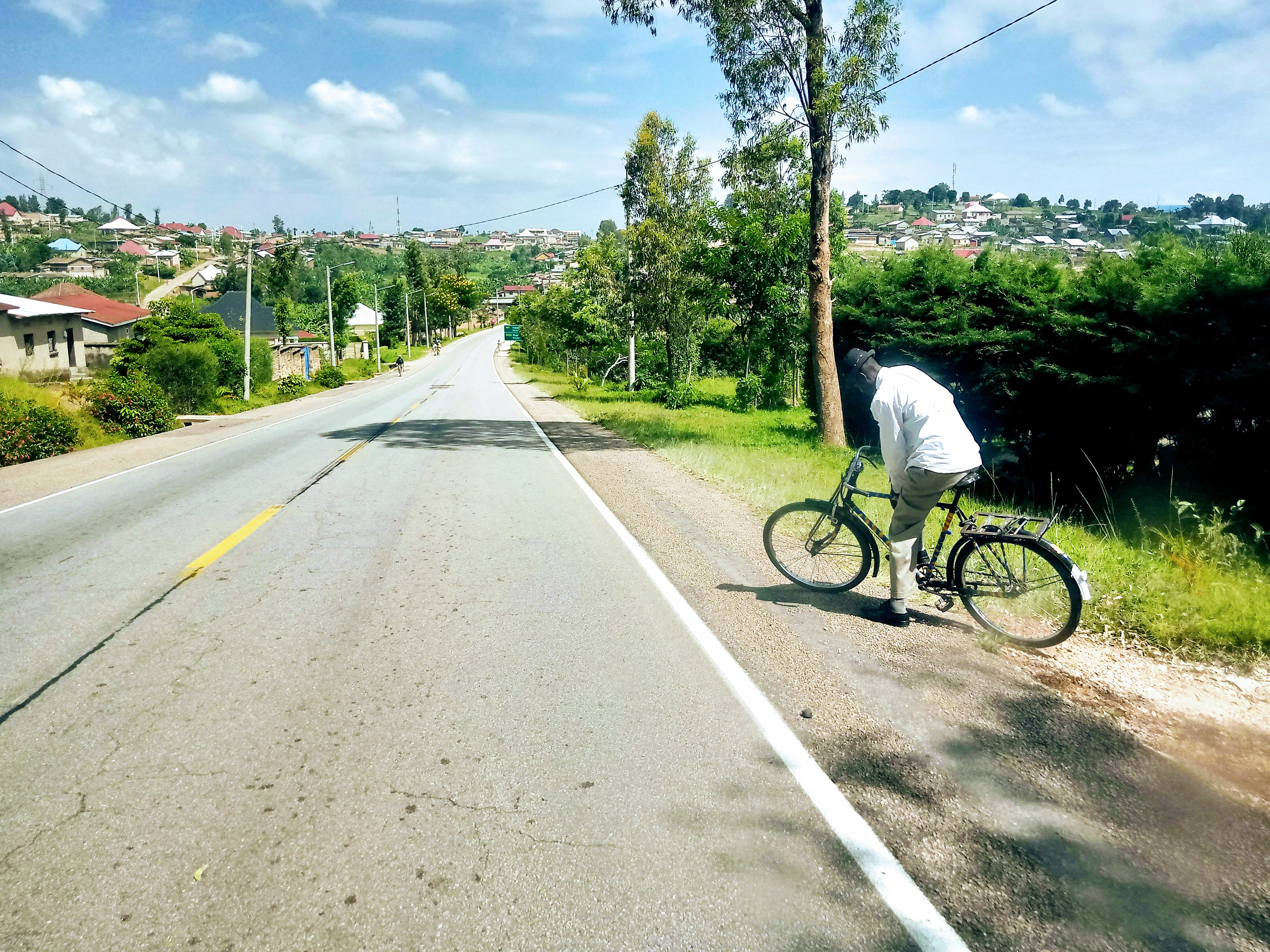

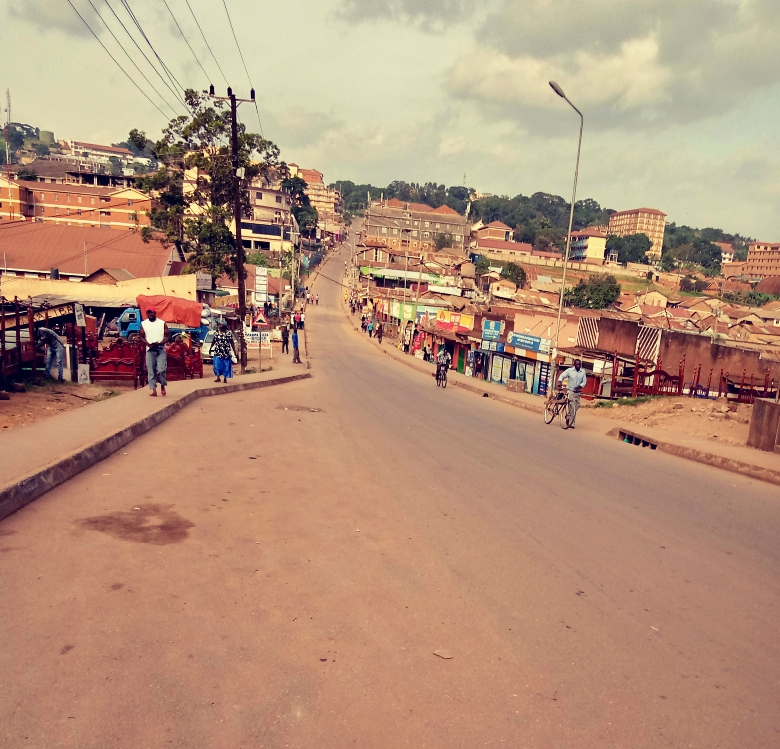

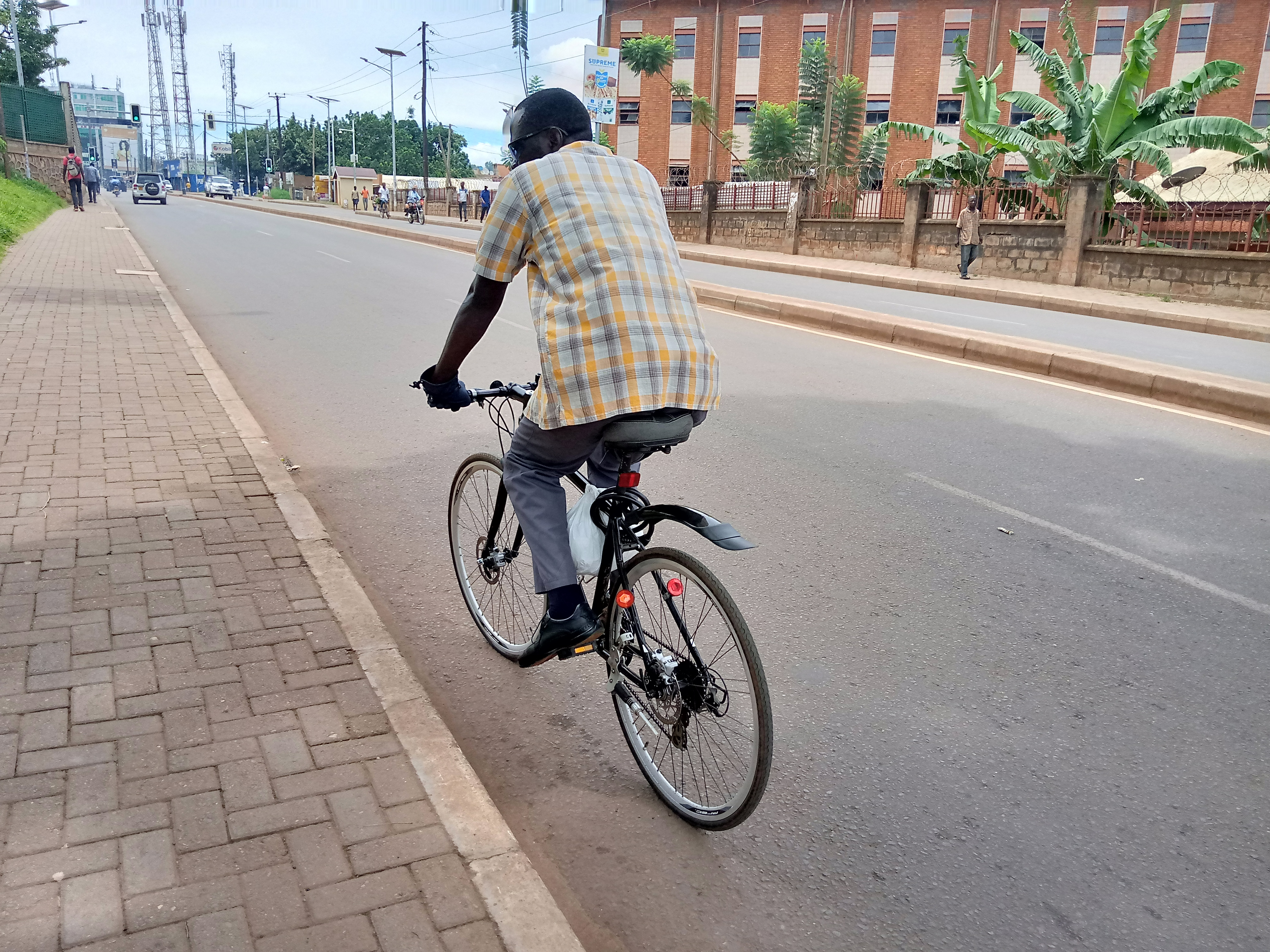

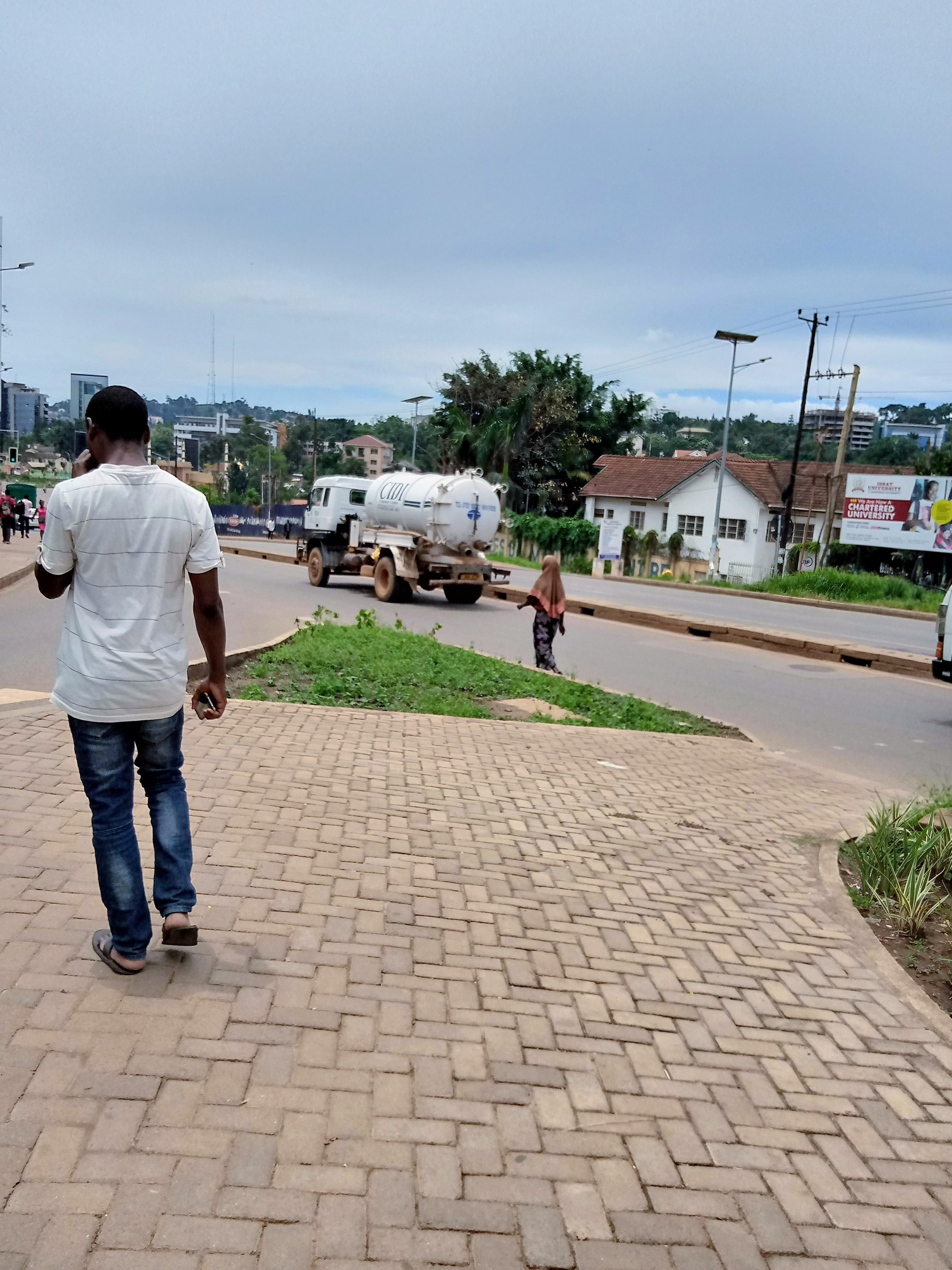

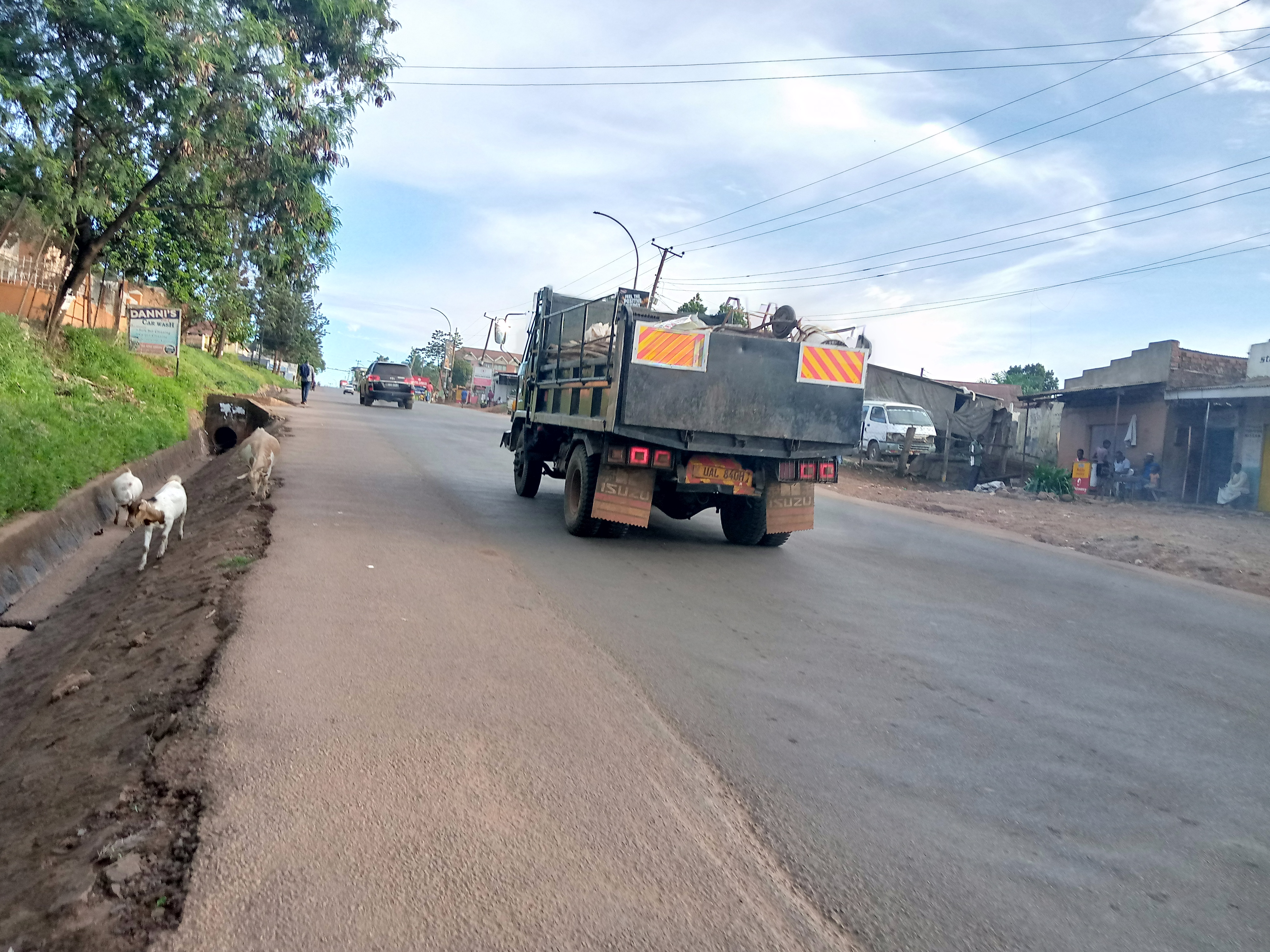

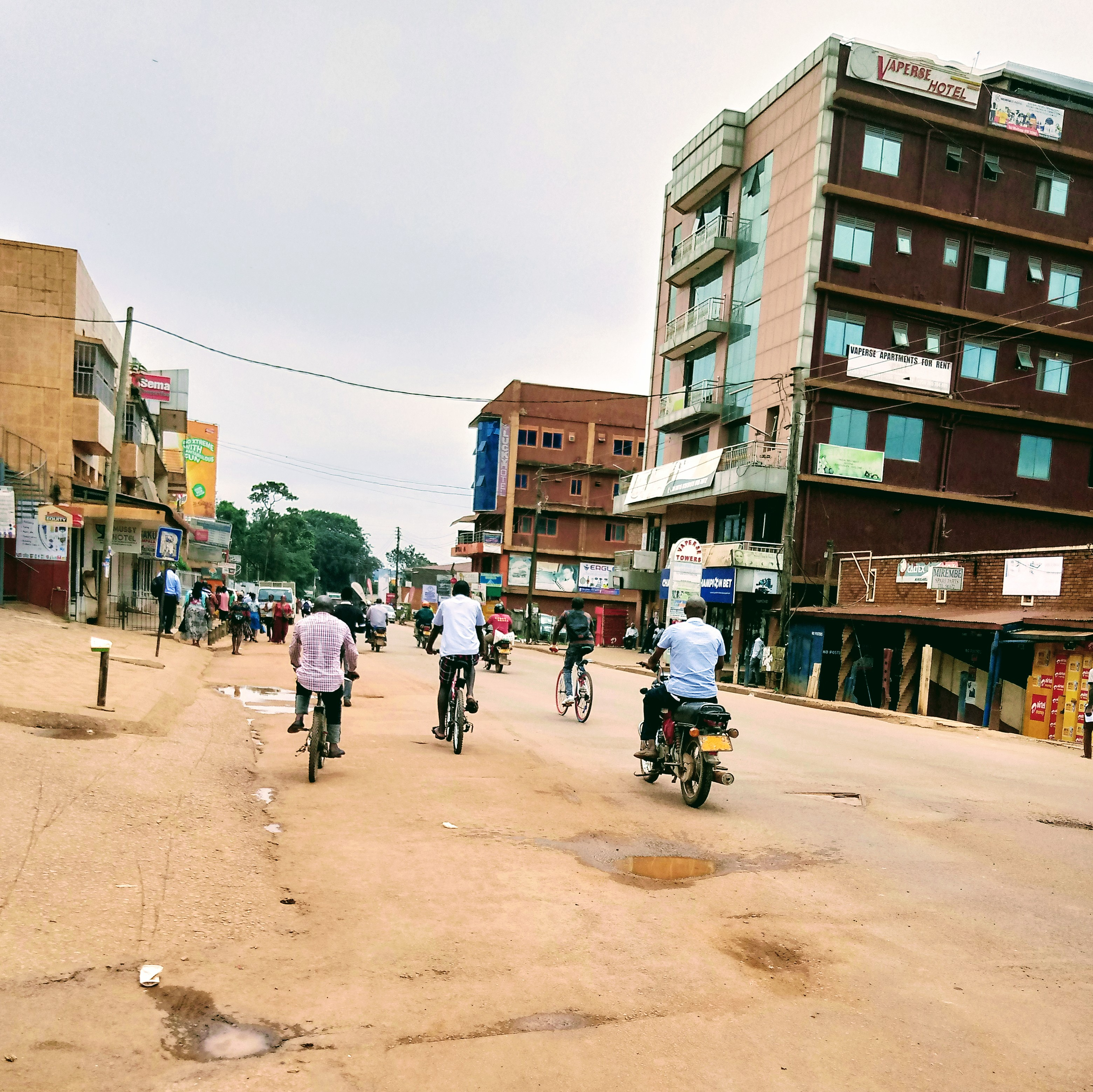

=== Business ===
Up until 5 May 2020, most businesses had to remain closed. Food markets remained open, but many vendors were unable to return home and had to sleep in markets due to the suspension of public transport. A small number of businesses such as factories, garages, hardware shops, metalworks and restaurants for takeaway were allowed to reopen on 5 May, while others such as hair salons and business arcades remained closed until 27 July.

Due to the high level of informality in Uganda's economy, it is not yet possible to assess the full magnitude of the economic impact of the lockdown, but the consequences for incomes and poverty are likely severe. Research results from July 2020 show that many informal entrepreneurs in Kampala had no income at all during the lockdown, and hence had to dip into their own savings, rely on government food support, or ask for help from family or friends to survive.

=== Music ===
A number of Ugandan musicians have released songs with messages to the people about the prevention of the virus, including Bobi Wine, Bebe Cool, and Joanita Kawalya.

== See also ==
- COVID-19 pandemic in Africa
- COVID-19 pandemic by country and territory
