= Edris Mayanja Njuki =

Ugandan journalist

Press Secretary to the President of Uganda
- In office 1971–1979
- President: Idi Amin

Personal details
- Born: 1947 Buikwe District, Uganda
- Died: 7 January 2020 Kampala, Uganda
- Citizenship: Ugandan
- Occupation: Journalist, government official

Edris Mayanja Njuki, also known as Ediriisa Mayanja Njuki, was a Ugandan journalist and government official who served as press secretary to President Idi Amin from 1971 to 1979.

== Early life and education ==
Njuki was born in 1947 in Buikwe District, Uganda. He attended Makerere College School and Kibuli Senior Secondary School. He said that he held a Cambridge School Certificate of Education and a diploma in journalism and media studies from the London School of Journalism.

== Career ==
Njuki began his career by joining the Ministry of Information and Broadcasting in 1968 as an assistant information officer. He later worked with Uganda Television (UTV) and received further training at the BBC in England, after which he was assigned to live reporting for Radio Uganda and worked in the press section at Nakasero.

After the 1971 coup that removed Milton Obote, Njuki was recruited into Amin's press unit and served as press secretary from 1971 to 1979. In 2002, he attempted to contest the Mukono District LCV chairperson position but was disqualified on the grounds that he lacked the required academic qualifications; he later won a petition against the Uganda Electoral Commission, and the High Court at Nakawa ordered the commission to set a fresh polling date. Njuki also served as the East Buganda representative in a National Resistance Movement Buganda regional structure.

== Death ==
Njuki died on 7 January 2020 at Case Medical Centre in Kampala of kidney failure. (Note: Uganda Radio Network gives his age at death as 71; The Observer gives 72.)

== Legacy ==
The Uganda Sports Press Association created the Ediriisa Mayanja Njuki Award for Best News Report (Print), named in recognition of his contribution to journalism.

== See also ==
- Henry Kyemba
- Juma Oris
- Moses Ali
- Godfrey Serunkuma Lule
