= Moses Ali =

Ugandan lawyer, politician and military officer (1939–2026)

The Right Honorable Moses Ali
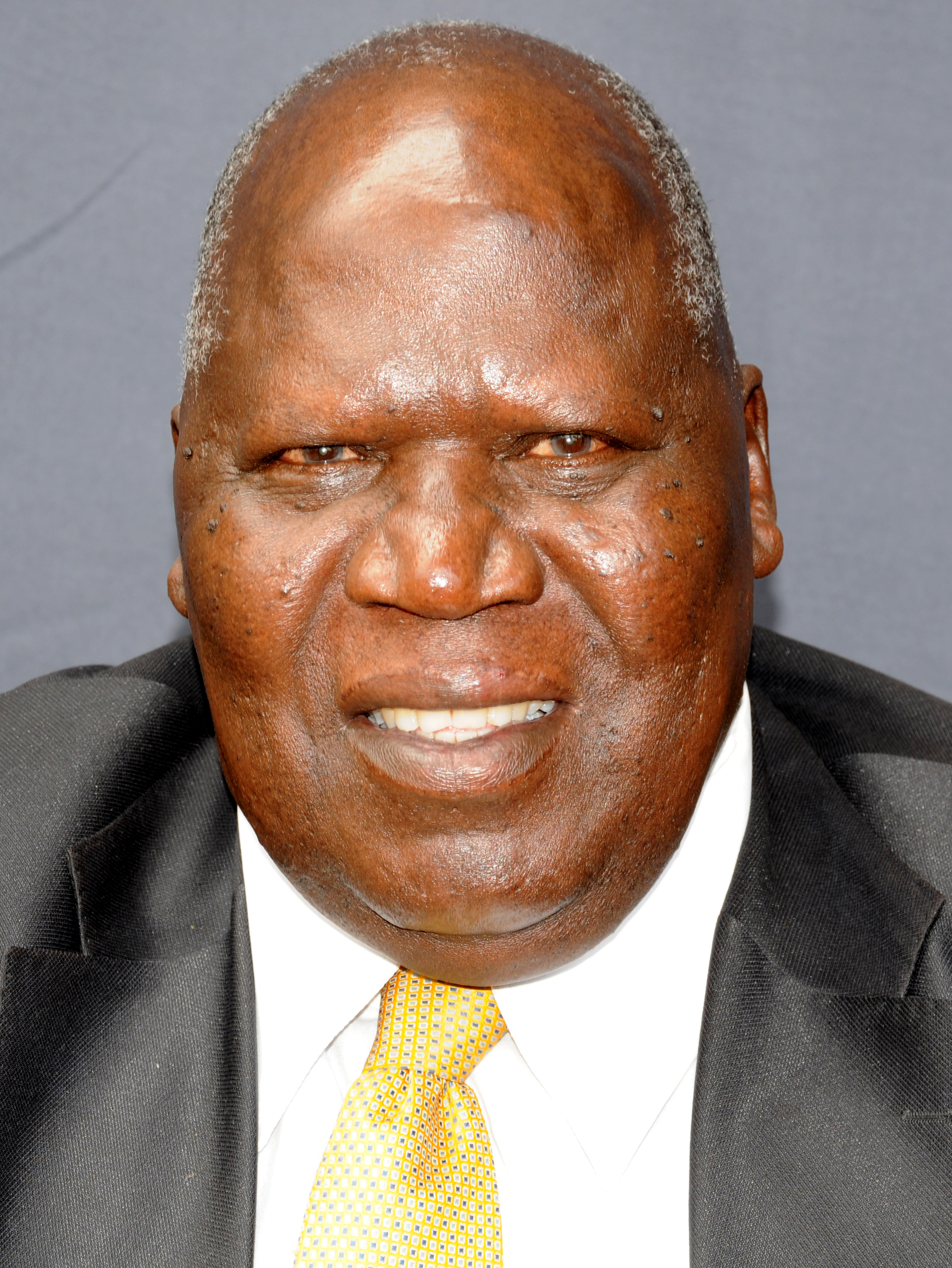
- Ali in 2011

Second Deputy Prime Minister of Uganda
- In office 2021–2026
- Preceded by: Kirunda Kivejinja
- Succeeded by: Crispus Kiyonga

First Deputy Prime Minister of Uganda
- In office 2016–2021
- Preceded by: Henry Kajura
- Succeeded by: Rebecca Kadaga

Third Deputy Prime Minister of Uganda
- In office 1989–1991
- Succeeded by: Abu Mayanja

Personal details
- Born: 5 April 1939 Adjumani District, Protectorate of Uganda
- Died: 18 July 2026 (aged 87) Kampala, Uganda
- Education: Makerere University (Bachelor of Laws); Law Development Centre (Diploma in Legal Practice)
- Occupation: Military officer, lawyer, politician

Moses Ali (5 April 1939 – 18 July 2026) was a Ugandan lawyer, military officer and politician who served as Second Deputy Prime Minister of Uganda from 2021 until May 2026.

Ali served in the Cabinet of Uganda as Third Deputy Prime Minister and Deputy Leader of Government Business in Parliament from May 2011 until June 2016. He also served as the first Deputy Prime Minister from June 2016 to May 2021. He served as an elected Member of Parliament for East Moyo County in Adjumani District from 2011 until his death on 18 July 2026.

== Early life and education ==
Moses Ali was born on 5 April 1939 in Adjumani District, Atabo district in Pakele division in Adjumani District. He was born to Muhammad Ali and Veronica Porsche Ali from Adjumani District. He sat his PLE at Erepi Church of Uganda in 1957, and earned a certificate at Church of Uganda Junior S. S. in 1957. From 1964 to 1966, he went to Old Kampala S.S. for his general certificate in education. He earned a certificate in Officer Cadet Training in Israel. He also undertook a certificate in Paratrooper Instructors Training in Israel in 1969, attained a certificate in Company Commanders Course in Israel in 1972. In 2007, he got a certificate in education in Law at the University of Wolverhampton in United Kingdom.

Ali held a Bachelor of Laws (LLB) degree from Makerere University and a Diploma in Legal Practice from the Law Development Centre (LDC) in Kampala. He also held qualifications from various military educational institutions in Uganda, Israel, and the United Kingdom. He was a Muslim.

== Career ==
Ali was the appointed officer in charge of training and commissioned to the rank of 2nd Lieutenant in the Uganda Paratrooper School in 1969. Ali was involved in the 1971 Ugandan coup d'état that overthrew President Milton Obote and brought Idi Amin to power. He consequently rose in the ranks during the Second Republic of Uganda, when Amin ruled the country. Ali was appointed Minister of Finance. Journalists Tony Avirgan and Martha Honey described him as one of Amin's "closest henchmen". As Minister of Finance, he used his position to organize an Islamic charity. This garnered him a lot of popular support, but also raised Amin's suspicions, as he feared Ali was attempting to construct a Muslim political base of support. Indeed, Ali gained many followers within the Uganda Army.

In April 1978, President Amin organized a meeting in Kampala, where he railed against ministers whom he deemed disloyal, too powerful or incompetent, including Ali. Accusing the Minister of Finance of mismanaging the Bank of Uganda, gross corruption, mishandling Muslim Supreme Council funds, and ignoring orders by the government. Amin became so angry during his speech that he threw a trashcan at Ali. Having realized that his situation was untenable, Ali got away as soon as possible. He quietly sneaked out of Kampala in his private car and fled to his home in the West Nile Region. When he got there, however, a group of hitmen attacked him, but he fended them off in a gunfight. Ali was convinced that his downfall and the attempted assassination had been organized by the Uganda Army commander Yusuf Gowon, a long-time rival of his. Amin subsequently stripped him of all of his military honours. However, Amin was still wary of Ali's large following, and only formally fired him from his ministerial portfolio in August 1978. Around October, ten SRB agents attempted to arrest Ali, but were killed.

When Amin's regime collapsed during the Uganda–Tanzania War of 1978–1979, Ali fled into exile in southern Sudan (present day South Sudan), finding refuge in Nimule. In the 1980s, he led the Uganda National Rescue Front in an armed rebellion against the government of reinstated President Obote, and became a warlord ruling a fief in southern Sudan. Among the insurgents of the early Ugandan Bush War, he waged the "most effective guerrilla campaign". Using his influence and military powers to his advantage, Ali eventually negotiated a favourable deal with Yoweri Museveni who took power as President at the Bush War's end in 1986. His forces were integrated into Uganda's new national army, the National Resistance Army which later became the Uganda People's Defence Force, and he was appointed a Major General. As a result of his powerful position in Uganda's new government and military, Ali became highly influential and quite wealthy. He was appointed the third deputy prime minister and tourism, wildlife, and antiquities minister on 17 July 1995. In 1996, he was the representative for East Moyo-Adjumani District and appointed the ministry's 2nd deputy prime minister and minister of trade and industry. In 2000, he was the minister of internal affairs.

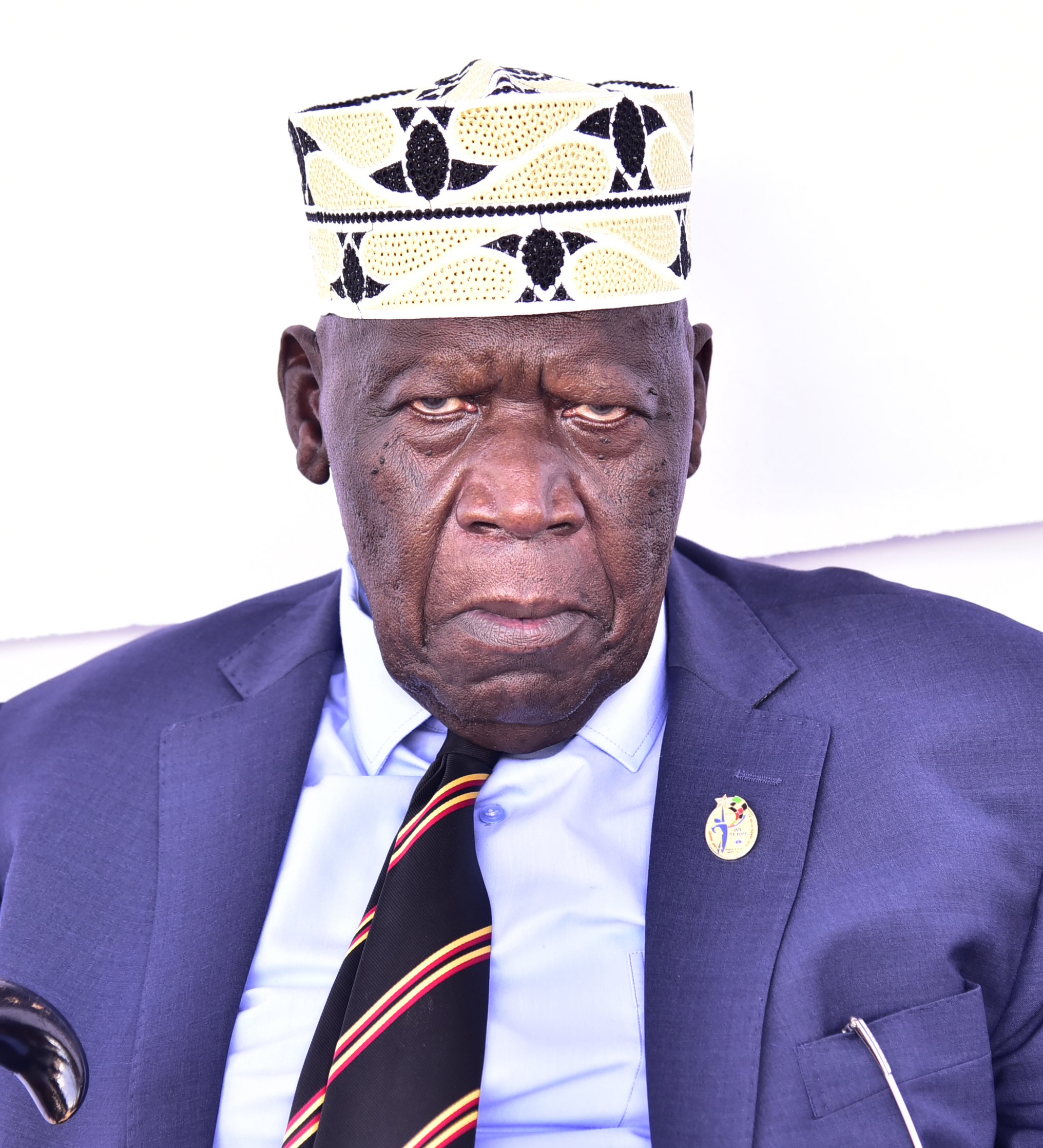
Ali after being elected in 2021

Ali even rose to First Deputy Prime Minister in Museveni's government. He served in the Ugandan Parliament from 2001 until his death in 2026. He was further promoted to Lieutenant General on 13 March 2003, but lost both his parliamentary seat and his ministerial appointment in 2006. In 2011, at the age of 72, he regained his position in parliament and was assigned new cabinet responsibilities. In the next year, Ali was once again promoted to the rank of general in the Uganda People's Defence Force. In 2016, following his re-election to parliament, he was again appointed First Deputy Prime Minister and Deputy Leader of Government Business in Parliament. After the 2021 Ugandan general election, Museveni reorganized his cabinet, with Ali being appointed Second Deputy Prime Minister and the parliament's Deputy Leader of Government Business. In the 2026 Ugandan general election he was elected in the Adjumani West constituency and sworn in on 13 May 2026. He was appointed to the parliament's Committee on ICT and National Guidance and the Committee on Subsidiary Legislation. On 26 May 2026, Ali was replaced as second deputy prime minister by Crispus Kiyonga, while his son Siraj Musa Ali was named as minister of works and transport by Museveni.

== Death ==
Ali died at Nakasero Hospital in Kampala, on 18 July 2026, at the age of 87. President Yoweri Museveni expressed deep sorrow, describing him as a long-serving soldier and political leader.

On 22 July, he was buried at his ancestral home at Atabu Parish in the Pakele Division of Adjumani District in the West Nile sub-region of Uganda, following funeral rites and a public gathering at Paridi Stadium.

== See also ==
- Parliament of Uganda
- Yoweri Museveni
- Caninet of Uganda
- Edris Mayanja Njuki
