= Ministry of East African Community Affairs (Uganda) =

Government ministry of Uganda

Coordinates: 00°19′13″N 32°35′22″E

- Coat of Arms of Uganda

Ministry overview
- Type: Ministry
- Jurisdiction: Government of Uganda
- Headquarters: Postel Building; 67–75 Yusuf Lule Road; Kampala, Uganda
- Ministry executive: Kahinda Otafiire, Minister of East African Community Affairs
- Website: Homepage

The Uganda Ministry of East African Community Affairs is a cabinet level-ministry headed by Minister Kahinda Otafiire.

== Location ==
The headquarters of the ministry are on the second and ninth floors of the Postel Building, at 67–75 Yusuf Lule Road in the Central Division of Kampala, Uganda's capital and largest city.

== Overview ==
The ministry was created in 2007 with the major objective of coordinating the affairs of the government of Uganda with the East African Community, which includes Burundi, Kenya, Rwanda, South Sudan, and Tanzania. One objective of the treaty establishing the East African Community consists of the:

- establishment of a customs union
- establishment of a common market
- subsequent creation of a monetary union
- eventual formation of a political federation

== List of ministers ==
- Rebecca Kadaga (8 June 2021 - present)
- Kahinda Otafiire (14 December 2019 - 8 June 2021)
- Kirunda Kivejinja (6 June 2016 - 14 December 2019)
- Shem Bageine (2 March 2013 - 6 June 2016)
- Eriya Kategaya (2007 - 2 March 2013)

== See also ==
- Government of Uganda
- Cabinet of Uganda
