= Eric Adriko =

Ugandan industrialist

- Born: 1 January 1941 (age 85); Vurra, Arua District, Uganda
- Education: University of London (BSc in Mechanical Engineering) (PhD in Mechanical Engineering)
- Occupations: Industrialist, mechanical engineer, businessman, academic and politician
- Years active: 1970 – present
- Title: Chancellor; Muni University
- Spouse: Julie Luwum Adriko

Eric Tiyo Sekebuga Adriko is a Ugandan industrialist, mechanical engineer, businessman, academic and politician. Effective 12 September 2016, he serves as the Chancellor of Muni University, one of the public universities in the country.

== Background and education ==
He was born in the town of Vurra, Arua District, in the West Nile sub-region of Uganda, in the year 1941. He attended Mvarra Primary School and Jiako Primary School, before enrolling in Arua Junior Secondary School in 1955. In 1956, he graduated at the top of his class in that year's Junior Leaving Examination (Primary 8).

He studied at King's College Budo. Later, from 1963 until 1966 he attended Queen Mary University of London, graduating with a Bachelor of Science in Mechanical Engineering. He received special permission to proceed to doctoral studies without first studying for a master's degree. In 1970, he graduated with a Doctor of Philosophy in mechanical engineering from the same university.

== Career ==
Eric Adriko returned to Uganda in 1970 to found the Faculty of Engineering, at Makerere University as the founding Dean of the faculty. In 1972, he resigned from Makerere to start his own consulting firm, "Adriko and Associates Limited". In 1978, he founded "Westnile Distillers Limited", in Arua town, in his home district. In 1979, he fled to neighboring Kenya, as the war that overthrew Idi Amin was approaching Kampala, Uganda's capital city.

He lived in Kenya for 10 years, continuing his consulting business, with the collaboration of Kenyan friends. In 1989, he returned to Uganda and was appointed to the commission that drafted the 1995 constitution. That same year, he joined politics, as the representative of Vurra County in the expanded National Resistance Council. Later, he was appointed minister for Industry and Technology in the Cabinet of Uganda. He served in different ministerial posts, rising to the position of Second Deputy Prime Minister. In 1996, he resigned from active elective politics.

After leaving active politics, he was appointed chairman board of directors at Uganda Revenue Authority from 1997 until 2004. Following that, he was appointed chancellor of Kyambogo University, from 2004 until 2014. where he served for two terms. After that, he was appointed the chancellor Muni University.

== See also ==
- Uganda National Rescue Front
