= Paul Etiang =

Ugandan politician (1938–2020)

Foreign Minister of Uganda
- President: Idi Amin
- Preceded by: Joshua Wanume Kibedi
- Succeeded by: Michael Ondonga

Personal details
- Born: 15 August 1938
- Died: 31 December 2020 (aged 82)

Paul Etiang, also styled Etyang, (15 August 1938 – 31 December 2020) was an Ugandan diplomat and politician who served as Deputy Prime Minister of Uganda from 1997 to 2001.

He died of COVID-19 during the COVID-19 pandemic in Uganda.

== Early life ==
Paul Etiang was born on 15 August 1938 in Tororo, Uganda. He attended Busoga College Mwiri and Makerere University College.

== Career ==
In 1962 Etiang joined the provincial administration and became a district officer. Two years later he was transferred to the Ministry of Foreign Affairs. In 1965 he became second secretary of Ugandan legation in Moscow, Soviet Union. While there he met and married Zahra A. Foum, an employee of the Tanzanian diplomatic mission.
