= Henry Kyemba =

Ugandan political figure (1939–2023)

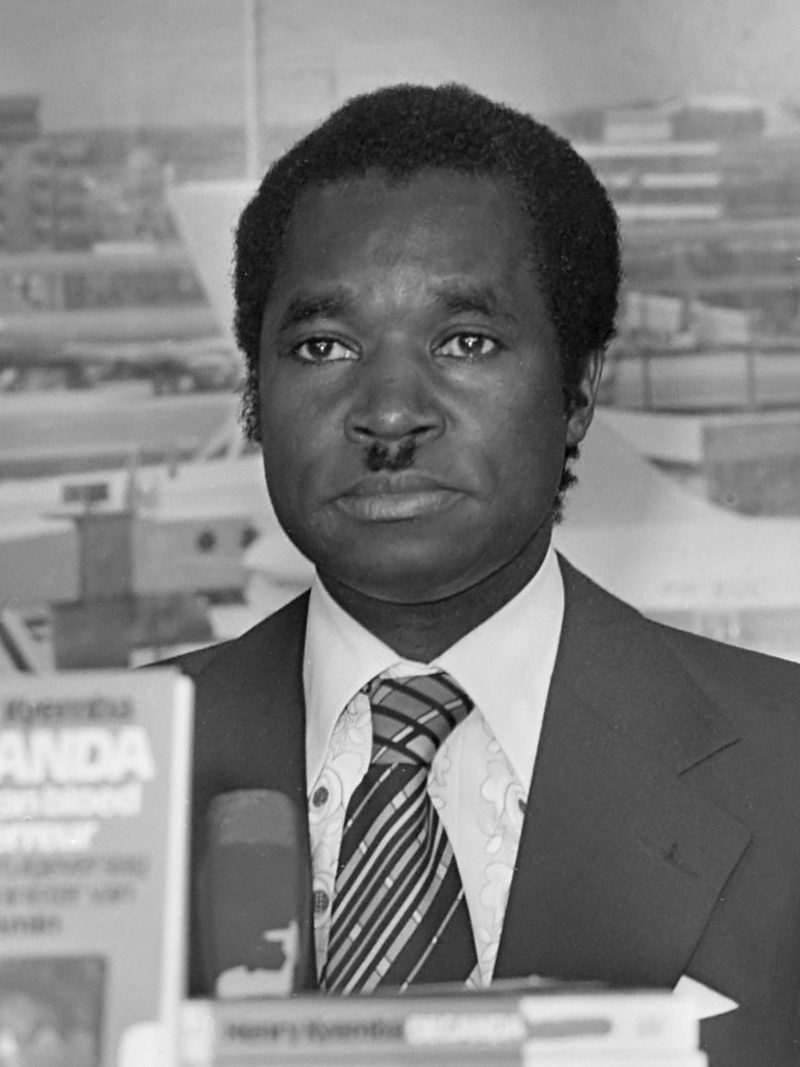
Kyemba in 1977

Henry Kisaja Magumba Kyemba (8 February 1939 – 18 October 2023) was a Ugandan political figure who held several high positions and finally became Minister of Health during Uganda's rule by Idi Amin. He served in that post from February 1974 until May 1977, when he fled into exile. He was also the author of State of Blood, a 1977 book he wrote after his flight from Uganda that describes Amin's tyrannical rule.

== Early life and education ==
Henry Kisaja Magumba Kyemba was likely born in Bunya County in Busoga on 8 February 1939, to Suzana Babirizangawo Mutekanga and Suleiman Kisajja, a colonial administrator.

Kyemba attended local primary schools, before joining Busoga College Mwiri for his Cambridge School Certificate (1951–1956). He was at Makerere University between 1957 and 1962 and graduated with a Bachelor of Arts (Hons.) in History. Kyemba held a master's degree in history from Northwestern University, Evanston, US and a Certificate in African studies from the same university. He also held an Honours degree in history from the London University.

== Career ==
Kyemba joined the Uganda civil service on the eve of Uganda's independence from Britain in 1962. He was the Principal Private Secretary to then Prime Minister of Uganda, Milton Obote. He stated it was a challenge to serve Obote as he recalled: "And it was a big challenge. I had known Milton Obote from Busoga College Mwiri. But here is the young man after Makerere in the Prime Minister’s office just before independence. Serving him as I must to the best of my ability". Kyemba described his life as private secretary as one of luxury, saying in an interview: "You travel first class, you stay in the best hotel where the President stays, and very rarely do you pay your bills. You have your per diems but the host government pays for your bills". Kyemba was a Muganda aristocrat, but continued to serve Obote despite the storming of the palace of the Buganda Kabakas in 1966, an operation that claimed thousands of lives. Kyemba was present during a failed assassination attempt against Obote on 15 December 1969, during which Obote took a bullet to his face. Likewise, Kyembas was present in June 1970 during another failed assassination attempt against the unpopular Obote.

In January 1971, Obote was due to attend a Commonwealth summit in Singapore, where he planned to face off against the British prime minister Edward Heath over the subject of British arms sales to South Africa. Obote along with President Julius Nyerere of Tanzania and President Kenneth Kaunda of Zambia had been greatly angered when Heath had lifted the mortarium on arms sales to South Africa in 1970 (which had been imposed by the previous government of Harold Wilson in 1964), and were threatening to leave the Commonwealth if the arms sales continued. Kyemba wrote about the summit in A State of Blood: "Obote felt secure enough to go to Singapore...I was certain that he was not as secure as he felt and acted accordingly. I moved my more valuable personal property out of my residence, together with my car, a BMW, and took them to Jinja." On 11 January 1971, Obote with Kyemba in tow left for Singapore. In the middle of the Commonwealth summit, on 25 January 1971, Kyemba was forced to tell Obote that he had just been deposed in a military coup d'etat and would not be returning to Uganda.

Following the 1971 Ugandan coup d'état, he joined Idi Amin's cabinet, rising through the ranks to become the Minister of Health (1974–1977) during Amin's regime. At the time of the coup, Kyemba was in Singapore, and he chose to return to Uganda to serve the new Second Republic that Amin had proclaimed. Most of Uganda's university-educated elite regarded Amin as an uncouth and unsophisticated man, a barely literate former NCO in the King's African Rifles, whom it would be easy to manipulate. The British anthropologist Mark Leopold described Kyemba as typical of Uganda's British-educated elite who were all too willing to first serve Obote despite his dictatorial tendencies, and then Amin. The Ugandan historian Phares Mutibwa wrote that Uganda's elite who had been educated at elite universities such as Makerere, Cambridge or Oxford along with the Inns of Court proved to be morally bankrupt people who lent their expertise and talents to serve murderous dictators, and only turned against Amin when he turned against them.

The economic life of British Uganda and then the First Republic was dominated by Indians (known as the Asians to the Ugandans), who were greatly disliked by the Ugandans who accused the Indians of blocking them from middle-class jobs. In 1972, Amin expelled all of the Indians living in Uganda including the 20,000 Indians who had taken Ugandan citizenship since independence in 1962. Kyemba wrote about the expulsion of the Asians in A State of Blood: "He [Amin] wanted the Asian property to hand over to his troops. It was a brutal and thoroughly racist decision". Kyemba noted the expulsion of the Indian merchants caused the collapse of Uganda's economy as he wrote: "the huge amount of Asian wealth and property had almost all vanished. Dairy farms had been allocated to butchers, who slaughtered the milk animals". The American anthropologist Simon Messing accused Kyemba of whitewashing his role in the expulsion because as Amin's private secretary he had drafted the decree for the expulsion of all the Indians from Uganda, an aspect of the expulsion that he did not see fit to mention in his memoirs. Messing wrote that Kyemba was a thoroughly amoral man who despite the murder of his brother by Amin's soldiers in 1972 continued to "faithfully" serve Amin for five more years, only defecting in 1977 when he felt his own life was in danger. As Health Minister, Kyemba had covered up the murder of an Anglo-Israeli hostage Dora Bloch after the Entebbe raid. Kyemba claimed that he was "sickened" by his own actions as he lied about Bloch's murder at the hands of agents of the State Research Bureau. Messing wrote that Kyemba's account of his time in Amin's government was nothing more than a series of self-serving rationalisations as he sought to explain away his actions as being somehow for the greater good of Uganda.Messing concluded that reading A State of Blood: "One is reminded of similar rationalizations of German officials who continued in government service during 1933-1945".

Kyemba defected to London in 1977, where he wrote a book on Amin's regime titled: "A State of Blood." Kyemba's account was given wide publicity and was presented as "the inside story of Amin's reign of terror" while Amin was described as being "the Hitler of our time". In a leader (editorial), The Times of London stated: "President Amin's reign of terror has now finally been presented by an unimpeachable eye witness and his regime becomes as much a matter of world condemnation-and even more sanctions-as that of Rhodesia and South Africa". Likewise, The Guardian in a leader praised A State of Blood and wrote: "As Minister of Health Kyemba was uniquely placed to pin down the truth about what happened to Archbishop Luwum and Mrs. Bloch". A State of Blood is still used as the main source for Second Republic era Uganda, and many of the incidents depicted in the 2006 film The Last King of Scotland were based upon incidents described in A State of Blood. The British historian Cecile Bishop wrote that A State of Blood was not necessarily an unreliable book as many of the incidents the book covers are presented accurately, but she noted that Kyemba had a vested interest in portraying himself as a victim rather than as a follower of Amin, which required that the book be treated with considerable caution as a source. Furthermore, she noted A State of Blood was written in a lucid, sensationalist style meant to shock and appall the reader with much of the book reading like something written by a British tabloid journalist, leading to questions about the precise reliability of A State of Blood. Bishop argued it was clear that Kyemba was aiming to write a bestseller and much of the book was designed for "entertainment value" by catering to the popular British view of Amin as a murderous man-child. At the back of A State of Blood was a list of various violent and/or sexual incidents said to involve Amin as the book promised to reveal "the truth" not only about Amin as president, but also about Amin's sex life as well. Bishop noted the list were marketed as like "candy" to the reader. Bishop wrote it was regrettable that even today that A State of Blood is treated as the main source for Second Republic Uganda even by serious scholars.

In A State of Blood, Kyemba was the first to accuse Amin of cannibalism. In his book, Kyemba proudly noted that he was a Muganda aristocrat who in his words "was born with the tradition of government behind me" as his family had served the Buganda Kabakas (kings) for centuries. Leopold wrote that Kyemba held the prejudices of someone from southern Uganda against people from northern Uganda, which was reflected in his book as he accused the Kakwa (Amin's people who reside primarily in the West Nile province) as being cannibals who practiced monstrous "blood rituals". Kyemba linked Amin's alleged cannibalism to him being a Kakwa, writing that the Kakwa were an especially savage people and Amin was merely a typical Kakwa in his brutality, adding that Amin had told him that he routinely ate human flesh precisely because he was a Kakwa.

Leopold argued that Kyemba's account of Amin must be understood in the context of the north-south divide in Uganda. Under British rule, it was arbitrarily decided that people from northern Uganda were tougher and fiercer, but also less intelligent than people from southern Uganda. It was British policy to encourage northern Ugandans to enlist in "hard" occupations such as the military, the police and prison guards while the "soft" fields of the arts and farming were reserved for the southern Ugandans. Recruitment into the King's African Rifles regiment was restricted to the "warrior" peoples of northern Uganda while the "non-warriors" of southern Uganda were not allowed to join. These images were embraced by people in both the north and south of Uganda. The northerners saw themselves as macho, tough, hardy folk unlike the southerners who were viewed as money-grubbing farmers and effeminate intellectuals. By contrast, the southerners inverted these stereotypes to depict the northerners as moronic ultra-violent barbarians while portraying themselves as "civilised" folk devoted to farming and the arts. Much of Kyemba's book reflected his background as a Muganda from southern Uganda who served a Kakwa from northern Uganda. In Uganda, it is common tactic to discredit an ethnic group one dislikes by accusing them of being cannibals, and the southerners routinely claim that the northerners are cannibals. Leopold wrote that during all his time as an anthropologist in Uganda that he had seen no evidence that the Kakwa, or any other ethnic group in Uganda for that matter, were cannibals or practiced the sinister "blood rituals" described by Kyemba.

He returned to Uganda in 1986, and he served as Secretary of Judicial Service Commission. In 2007, Kyemba criticised The Last King of Scotland saying: "Being a historian by profession, I find the film quite shallow. Since Ugandans are not very good at writing history, someone who does it for them should do it well. My book would have given a better story. I do not mean it had it all. A State of Blood was written recorded at the actual time the events were taking place and is not fiction. But at least a lot of the stories were taken from my book".

== Life and service in Rotary International ==
Henry Kyemba was fiercely dedicated member of the Rotary International movement, becoming Rotarian in 1987 as a Charter Member of The Source of the Nile Rotary Club now in Jinja City. Under Henry Kyemba's influence and contribution, the Rotary Movement grew even bigger in Uganda to now include some 400 clubs as of 2023. Uganda is now in District 9213, along with the vast nation of Tanzania. At the time of his demise, Henry Kyemba was a Past District Governor (PDG) of Rotary International District 9200 (Uganda, Kenya, Eritrea, Ethiopia and Tanzania). District governor is the highest office possible in the Rotary International Movement at district level, with only the President of Rotary International being as leader of the global movement being bigger. The Rotary Club claims that his contributions positively impacted millions.

== Death ==
Henry Kyemba died from diabetes-related complications on 18 October 2023, at the age of 84 in a suburb of Kampala.

== Writings ==
- Kyemba, Henry (1977). A State of Blood: The Inside Story of Idi Amin. New York: Ace Books. ISBN 0-441-78524-4.

== Books and articles ==
- Bishop, Cecile (2017). Postcolonial Criticism and Representations of African Dictatorship The Aesthetics of Tyranny. London: Taylor & Francis. ISBN 9781351553575.
- Leopold, Mark (2020). Idi Amin: The Story of Africa's Icon of Evil. New Haven: Yale University Press.
- Messing, Simon (October 1979). "Inside Amin's Uganda". Africa Today. 26 (1): 55–56.

== See also ==
- Edris Mayanja Njuki
- Isaac Maliyamungu
- Juma Oris
