= Eriya Kategaya =

Ugandan lawyer and politician

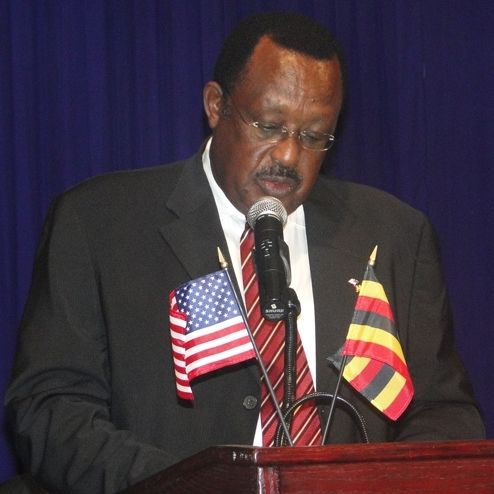
- Kategaya in 2009
- Born: 4 July 1945; Ntungamo, Uganda
- Died: 2 March 2013 (aged 67); Nairobi, Kenya
- Citizenship: Uganda
- Education: UDSM (LL.B)
- Occupations: Lawyer and politician
- Years active: 1975–2013

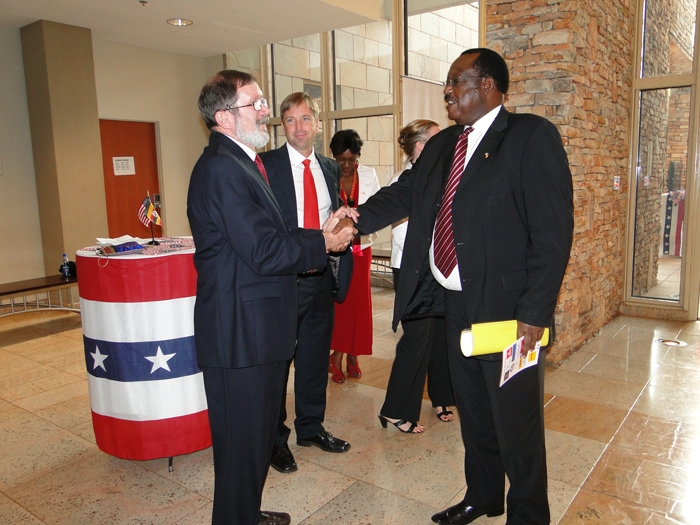
Dave Eckerson welcomes guest of honor Eriya Kategaya at the U.S. 235th anniversary celebration.

Eriya Kategaya (4 July 1945 – 2 March 2013) was a Ugandan lawyer and politician. At the time of his death, he was Uganda's first deputy prime minister and minister for East African Community Affairs. He was also an ex officio member of the Ugandan Parliament, on account of being a cabinet minister.

== Background ==
Kategaya was born on 4 July 1945 in Karagwe Itojo, Ntungamo District, in Western Uganda.

He was a longtime associate of President Yoweri Museveni. They had studied together at Mbarara High School and later at Ntare School from 1961 to 1966. Kategaya and Museveni also attended the University of Dar es Salaam at the same time.

== Education ==
Kategaya held a Bachelor of Laws (LLB) degree from the University of Dar-es-Salaam. At the time of his graduation, the university was part of the University of East Africa.

== Military and political training ==
Kategaya was part of President Yoweri Kaguta Museveni's Front for National Salvation (FRONASA), a group of Ugandan exiles in Tanzania who eventually helped topple Idi Amin in 1979 with the help of the Tanzania People's Defence Force. In 1980, Kategaya was a founder of the Uganda Patriotic Movement, headed by Museveni to contest in the elections. When Museveni launched the guerrilla struggle against the Milton Obote II administration (1981–1985), Kategaya served in the 'External Wing' of the rebel National Resistance Movement (NRM) and National Resistance Army (NRA). The NRM transformed into the National Resistance Movement political party, while the NRA became the Uganda People's Defence Force (UPDF). He was a brigadier general in the National Resistance Army from 1987, holding Army number RO-002, although he never served in any military position, as he was serving in other government offices as a senior cabinet minister.

== Political career ==
When the NRM and NRA eventually took power in January 1986, Kategaya was one of the groups' top leadership and considered by most as the Number Two after Museveni. Between 1986 and 2001, Kategaya served in various capacities as a national political commissar for the NRM and minister in Museveni's governments.

In 1991, Kategaya delivered the keynote address at the Ugandan North American Association convention in Boston, Massachusetts.

During Museveni's second term as president (2001–2006), Kategaya, then serving as internal affairs minister, famously fell out with the president when he opposed having the Constitution amended to remove presidential term limits. In May 2003, Kategaya was dropped from his ministerial position during a cabinet reshuffle, along with other ministers who opposed the removal of term limits. He continued to speak out against amending the term limits provision until eventually the heavily pro-Museveni Parliament pushed the amendment through.

From the time he was dropped from the cabinet, Kategaya returned to practice as a private lawyer with J.B. Byamugisha Advocates, a law firm based in Kampala.

In December 2004, he participated in the formation of the Forum for Democratic Change, an anti-Museveni coalition which went on to become the main opposition group in Uganda after the 2006 general elections. Kategaya, however, maintained a low profile and rarely participated in FDC affairs.

Following Museveni and NRM's win in the 2006 general elections, rumours began spreading that Kategaya was in reconciliation talks with Museveni. The rumours proved well-founded when Museveni nominated his old ally for approval by the Parliament as a cabinet minister. Subsequently, he was appointed to the posts of deputy prime minister and minister for East African Community Affairs. Kategaya has been instrumental in the continued growth of the East African Community.

In the cabinet reshuffle of 27 May 2011, Kategaya maintained all his cabinet posts.

== Death ==
Kategaya died on 2 March 2013 in Nairobi, where he had been hospitalised.
