= Lukia Isanga Nakadama =

Ugandan politician (born 1970)

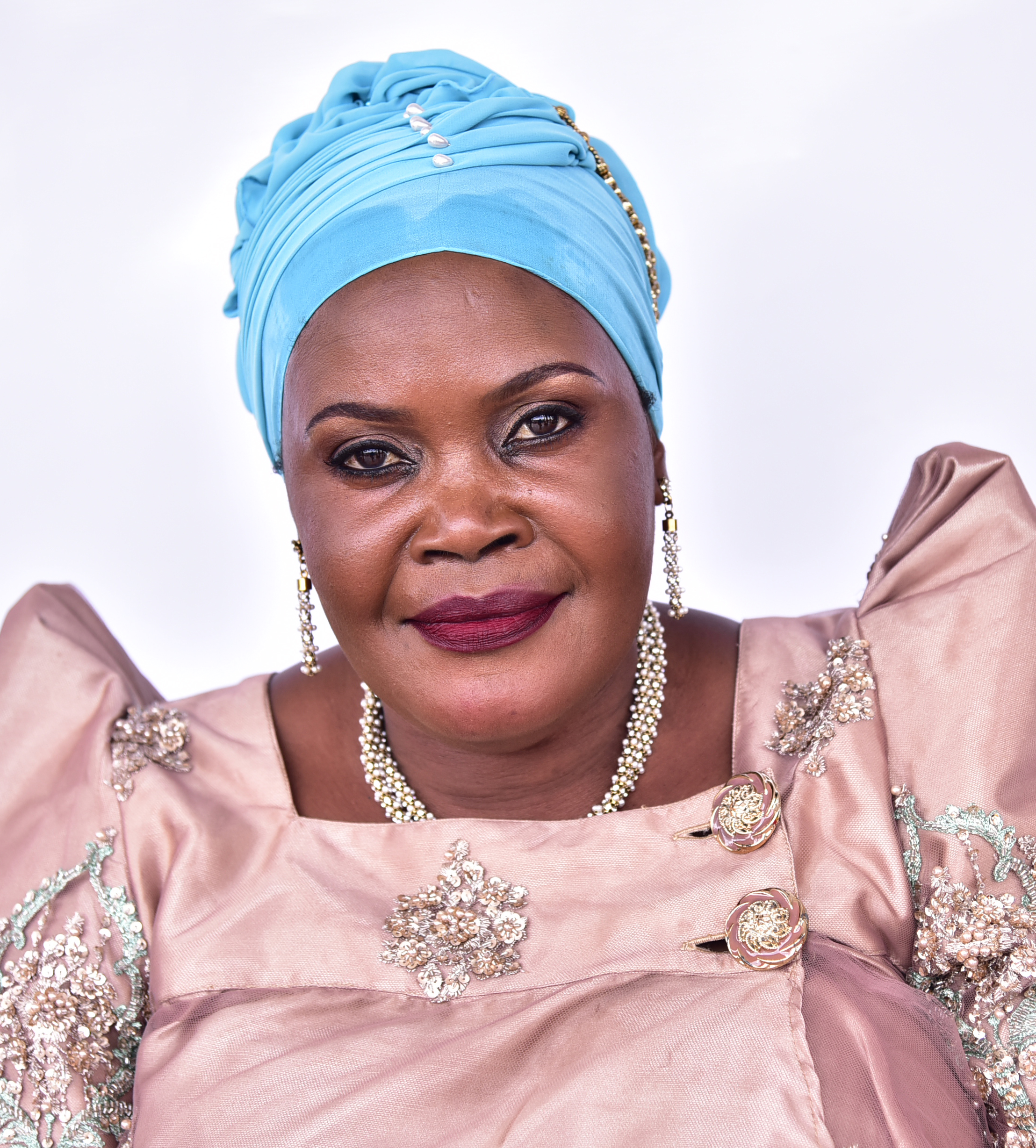
- Born: 2 February 1970 (age 56); Uganda
- Citizenship: Uganda
- Education: Islamic University in Uganda (BA in Public Administration) (Diploma in Education); Kyambogo University (Certificate in Teaching)
- Occupations: Educator and politician
- Years active: 2001–present
- Known for: Politics
- Title: Third Deputy Prime Minister and Minister Without Portfolio
- Spouse: Hajji Daudi Isanga

Lukia Isanga Nakadama (born 2 February 1970), sometimes written Rukia Isanga Nakadama, is a Ugandan businesswoman, educator and politician. She is the current Third Deputy Prime Minister of Uganda and Minister Without Portfolio, effective 9 June 2021. However, she was reappointed the Third Deputy Prime Minister of Uganda and Minister without Portfolio in the 12th Parliament of Uganda.

Before that, she served as State Minister for Gender and Culture in the Ugandan Cabinet. She was appointed to that position in 2006. In the cabinet reshuffle of 16 February 2009, and that of 27 May 2011, she retained this cabinet post. She is also the elected Member of Parliament (MP) for Mayuge District Women's Representative. She has been continuously re-elected to that position since 2001.

== Early life and education ==
Isanga Nakadama was born on 2 February 1970. She was raised in a polygamous family, the 6th born of her mother's 12 children. Her father had two other wives. She attended Nabisunsa Girls School, a public middle and high school, located in Nakawa Division in northeastern Kampala, the capital city of Uganda. She obtained a Certificate in Teaching, prior to 1999, from the Institute of Teacher Education Kyambogo (ITEK), which is now part of Kyambogo University, one of Uganda's eight public universities, as of February 2015. She also holds a diploma in Customs Clearing & Forwarding, which she obtained in 2000. Her diploma in Education was obtained in 2004, from the Islamic University in Uganda (IUIU). She also holds a degree of Bachelor of Arts in Public Administration from IUIU.

== Career ==
Prior to 2001, she worked as a private businesswoman and as a teacher at the Hassantourabi Education Centre in Mayuge District. She was first elected to Parliament in 2001, as the Woman Representative for her home district of Mayuge. In 2006, she was re-elected to continue representing the same constituency. She was appointed to her present cabinet post in 2006.

== Personal life ==
Rukia Nakadama is of the Islamic faith. She is married to Hajji Daudi Isanga. She belongs to the National Resistance Movement political party.

== See also ==
- Cabinet of Uganda
- Parliament of Uganda
- Mayuge District
