= Crispus Kiyonga =

Ugandan politician

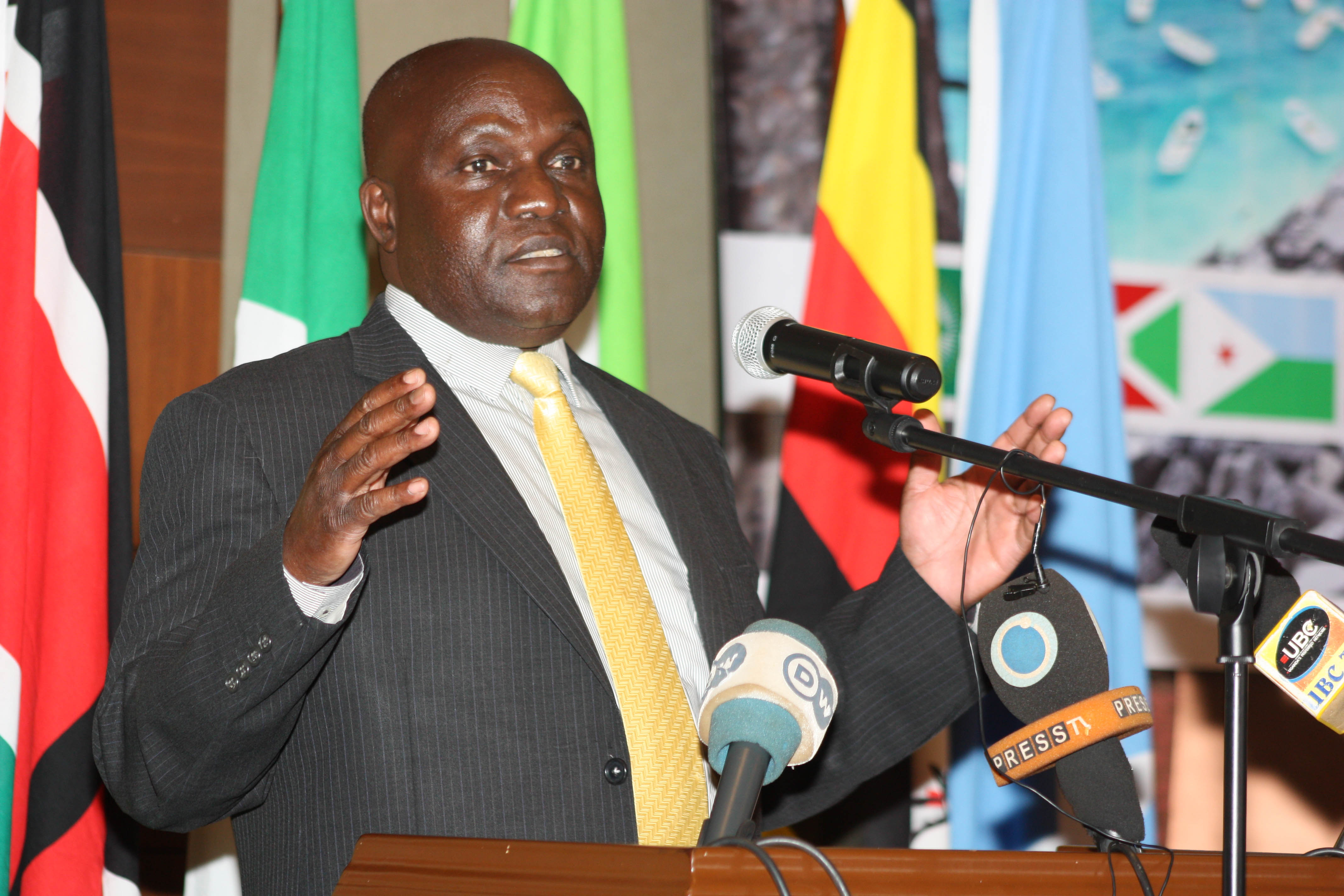
- Kiyonga in 2015
- Born: 19 September 1952 (age 74); Uganda
- Citizenship: Uganda
- Education: Makerere University (Bachelor of Medicine and Bachelor of Surgery); Johns Hopkins School of Public Health (Master of Health Science in Population Dynamics)
- Occupations: Physician, politician
- Years active: 1980 — present
- Known for: Politics
- Title: Uganda's Ambassador to China

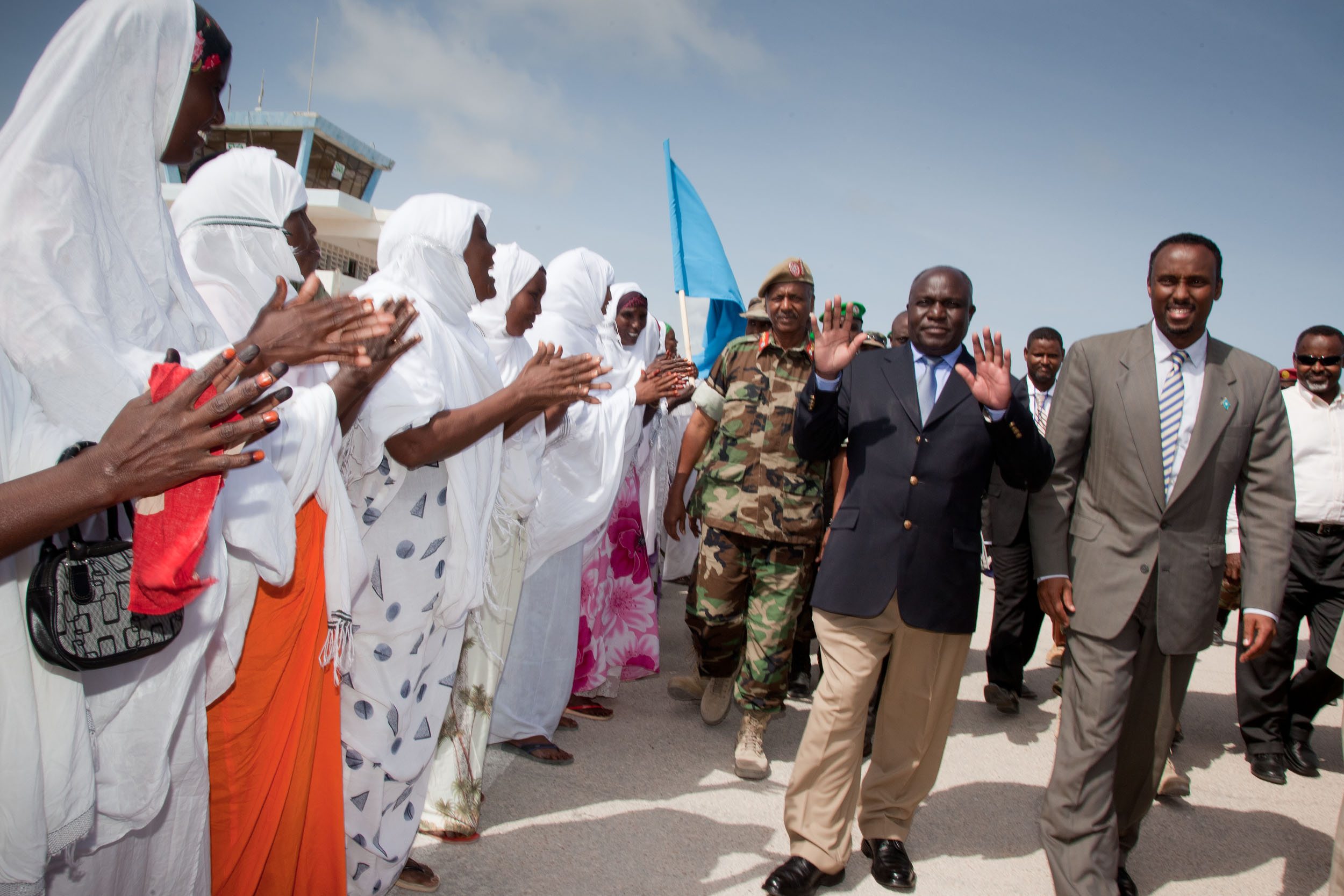
Ugandan Defence Minister Dr Crispus Kiyonga arrives in Mogadishu

Crispus Walter Kiyonga (born 19 September 1952) is a Ugandan medical doctor, politician and career diplomat. He is the Second Deputy Prime Minister of Uganda Since 2026. He is the current Chancellor of the Makerere University, the largest public university of Uganda. He served as Uganda's Ambassador to China. He previously served as the Minister of Defence in the Cabinet of Uganda from 2006 to 2016.

Prior to that, he was Minister Without Portfolio in the Office of the President from 2005 to 2006. During the cabinet reshuffles of 16 February 2009, 27 May 2011, and 1 March 2015, he retained his cabinet post. In 2016, he lost the Member of Parliament (MP) seat for Bukonjo County West to Robert Katusabe in Kasese District, in the Ugandan Parliament. However, in the 2026 elections, he reclaimed the Bukonzo West parliamentary seat in the 12th Parliament of Uganda which led to his appointment by President Museveni as the Second Deputy Prime Minister and Deputy Leader of Government Business in Parliament.

== Early life and education ==
Kiyonga was born in Kasese District in the Western Region of Uganda on 19 September 1952. Between 1959 and 1966, he attended Bwera Primary School, in Bwera, a few kilometres from the Ugandan border with the Democratic Republic of the Congo. During 1967 through 1970, he attended Nyakasura School from S1 to S4. He studied for his S5 and S6 at Kings College Budo from 1971 to 1972.

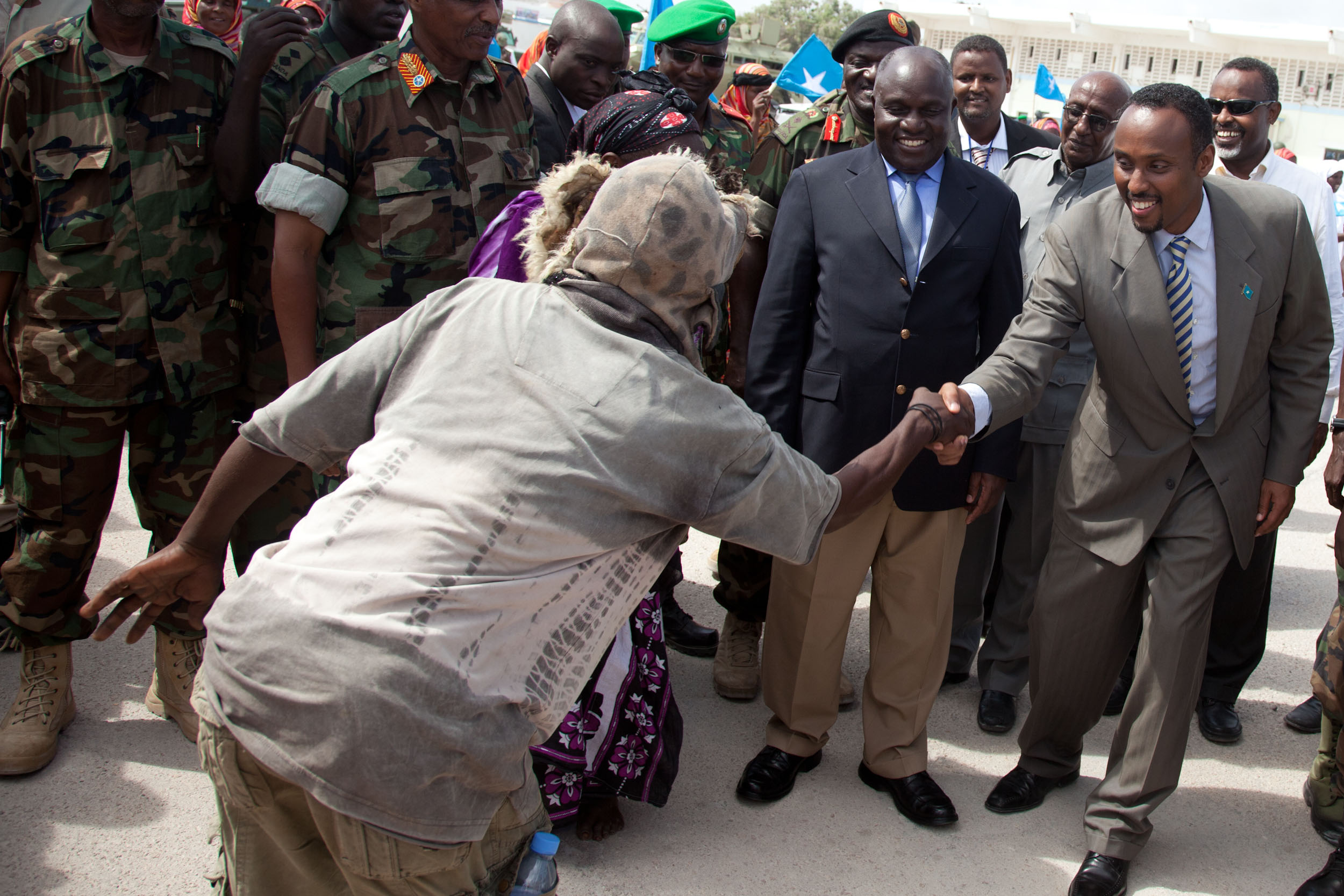
Dr. Crispus Kiyonga in Mogadishu

From 1973 through 1978, he attended Makerere University School of Medicine where he obtained his first medical degree, the Bachelor of Medicine and Bachelor of Surgery (MBChB) in 1978. Later, in 2004, he obtained a Master of Health Science (MHS) with specialisation in Population Dynamics from the Johns Hopkins School of Public Health. His studies at Johns Hopkins were funded through a Fogarty International Center Scholarship.

== Career ==
During the first post-Idi Amin national elections in Uganda in 1980, Kiyonga participated as a candidate on the Uganda Patriotic Movement (UPM) platform. He won in his constituency, making him the only UPM candidate who won during those elections. He joined the National Resistance Movement (NRM) during its struggle against the second Milton Obote regime from 1981 until 1986.

From 1986, when the NRM assumed power in Uganda, until 2006 when he was appointed as Minister of Defense, Crispus Kiyonga held several cabinet and non-cabinet posts in the Ugandan Government:

- 1986 - 1986: Minister for Cooperatives & Marketing
- 1986 - 1992: Minister of Finance - Credited with the establishment of Uganda Revenue Authority.
- 1994 - 1996: Minister of Internal Affairs
- 1996 - 2001: Minister of Health - Credited with efficient handling of Ebola outbreak in Gulu in 2000. Chairman Global Fund.
- 2001 - 2006: Minister without Portfolio in the Office of the President and National Political Commissar.
- 2006 - 2016: Minister of Defense

Between 1992 and 1994, Kiyonga left the government temporarily to serve as a consultant with the World Bank and the African Development Bank. He returned to active politics in 1994 when he was elected to the Constituent Assembly that drew up the 1995 Uganda Constitution.

In August 2003, he led a Ugandan government delegation to the Ugandan North American Association (UNAA) convention in Boston, Massachusetts.

He continuously represented Bukonjo County West, in the Ugandan Parliament, from 1980 until 2016. In 2016, he was appointed Uganda's Ambassador to China.

== See also ==
- Cabinet of Uganda
- Parliament of Uganda
- Kasese District
