= Deputy Prime Minister of Uganda =

Political position in the Cabinet of Uganda

The deputy prime minister of Uganda is a political position in the Cabinet of Uganda. Historically, several deputy prime ministers have served concurrently.

== Deputy Prime Ministers ==
- Eriya Kategaya, 1986-2003
- Abu Mayanja, 1986-1989
- Paul Ssemogerere, 1986-1995
- Moses Ali, ?-1989-1991
- Tom Butime, ?-1989-1991
- Abu Mayanja, 1991–1994
- Eric Adriko, 1994–1997
- Moses Ali, 1996–2006
- Paul Etiang, 1997–2001
- Tom Butime, 2000–2002
- James Wapakhabulo, 2001–2004
- Henry Kajura, 2002–2016
- Kirunda Kivejinja, 2006–2011
- Eriya Kategaya 2006–2013
- Moses Ali, 2013–2026
- Kirunda Kivejinja, 2016–2019
- Rebecca Kadaga, since 2021
- Lukia Isanga Nakadama, since 2021
- Crispus Kiyonga, since 2026

== See also ==
- Prime Minister of Uganda
- Cabinet of Uganda
