= Kirunda Kivejinja =

Ugandan politician (1935–2020)

- Born: 12 June 1935; Uganda Protectorate
- Died: 19 December 2020 (aged 85); Kampala, Uganda
- Education: Delhi University (BSc in Zoology)
- Occupation: Politician
- Years active: 1962 – 2020
- Title: Second Deputy Prime Minister of Uganda & Minister without Portfolio

Ali Kirunda Kivejinja (12 June 1935 – 19 December 2020), more commonly known as Kirunda Kivejinja, was a veteran Ugandan politician and senior presidential advisor to the President of Uganda, Yoweri Museveni. He at the time of his demise was the Second Deputy Prime Minister and Minister without portfolio in the Ugandan Cabinet.

Previously, he served as the Minister for Relief and Social Rehabilitation, Internal Affairs and as Deputy Prime Minister of Uganda. He was appointed Minister of East African Community Affairs on 6 June 2016, and left that position on 14 December 2019.

He died on 19 December 2020 and his death was said to have been caused by the raging COVID-19 disease which he was reported to be battling with for about a fortnight at Mulago Referral Hospital.

== Education ==
Ali Kirunda Kivejinja studied at the Kibuli Junior School and Busoga College Mwiri in Uganda and then took a pre-university course at Madras Christian College before obtaining a Bachelor of Science (Honours) Degree in Zoology at Delhi University on a Government of India scholarship. While in India he was treasurer of the African Students Association (ASA) which had among its members Bingu wa Mutharika, John Malecela and John Mataure.

== Political career ==
Ali Kiruda Kivejinja returned to Uganda in 1962. During the 1960s he served as a political mobilizer for the Uganda People's Congress, the ruling political party at that time. Since the overthrow of the second Milton Obote regime in 1986, Kivejinja has served in several positions in the government led by President Yoweri Museveni. In 1986, he was appointed Minister of Relief and Social Rehabilitation. He was once the member of parliament or Bugweri constituency. He has since served as Minister of Internal Affairs and Third Deputy Prime Minister of Uganda. Since August 2012 he has been made Senior Presidential Advisor for Internal Affairs to President Museveni. On 6 June 2016, he was named as the new Second Deputy Prime Minister and Minister for East African Affairs in the new Cabinet announced that day.

== Death ==
Ali Kirunda Kivejinja died on 19 December 2020, at Mulago National referral Hospital in Kampala Uganda from COVID-19 during the COVID-19 pandemic in Uganda, according to President Yoweri Museveni.

== Books ==
Kivejinja was the author of Uganda: The Crisis of Confidence, a book about Uganda's political history.

== See also ==
- Cabinet of Uganda
- Parliament of Uganda
