= List of university leaders in Uganda =

Number	University	Chancellor	Vice-chancellor
1	African Bible University (Uganda)		O. Palmer Robertson
2	African Rural University		Denis Okello Atwaru
3	Aga Khan University		Kweku Bentil
4	All Saints University	John Charles Odur Kami	Vacant
5	Ankole Western University	Yona Mwesigwa Katonene	
6	Bishop Stuart University	Sheldon Mwesigwa	John F. Mugisha
7	Bugema University	John Kakembo	Patrick Manu
8	Busitema University	Vinand Nantulya	Paul Waako
9	Busoga University	Michael Kyomya	David Kibikyo
10	Cavendish University Uganda	Benjamin Mkapa	Ketrine M. Salati
11	Gulu University	Frederick Kayanja	George Openjuru
12	Clarke International University	Zac Niringiye	Rose Clarke Nanyonga
13	International University of East Africa	Emmanuel Tumusiime-Mutebile	Dr. Emeka Akaezuewa
14	Islamic University in Uganda		Prof Ismail Simbwa Gyagenda
15	Kabale University	Mondo Kagonyera	Joy Kwesiga
16	Kampala University	Mondo Kagonyera	Badru Ddungu Kateregga
17	Kampala International University	John Ssebuwufu	Mouhamad Mpezamihigo
18	Kumi University		Owen Kim
19	Kyambogo University	John Ssebuwufu	Elly Katunguka
20	Lira University		Jasper Ogwal Okeng
21	Livingstone International University		Dr. Henri Buregea Bin Rwakenda
22	Makerere University	Ezra Suruma	Barnabas Nawangwe
23	Mbarara University	Charles Olweny	Celestino Obua
24	Mountains of the Moon University	Edward Rugumayo	Pius Coxwell Achanga
25	Muni University	Archbishop (emeritus) Henry Luke Orombi	Christine Dranzoa
26	Muteesa I Royal University	Julia Sebutinde	Arthur Sserwanga
27	Ndejje University	Stephen Talitwala	Eriabu Lugujjo
28	Nkumba University	Emmanuel Katongole	Jude T. Lubega
29	Nsaka University		
30	Soroti University	Francis Omaswa	Robert Ikoja-Odongo
31	St. Lawrence University	Edward Ssekandi	Kakinda Frank Mbaaga
32	Uganda Christian University	Stephen Kazimba Mugalu	John Senyonyi
33	Uganda Management Institute	Namirembe Bitamazire	James Nkata
34	Uganda Martyrs University	John Baptist Odama	John Maviiri
35	Uganda Pentecostal University		John Ntambirweki
36	Uganda Technology and Management University	Kalonzo Musyoka	Venansius Baryamureeba
37	University of Kisubi	Peter Kazzekulya	John Ssebuwufu
38	University of Military Science and Technology		
39	Victoria University Uganda	Martin Aliker	Krishna N. Sharma
40	St. Augustine International University	Tress Bucyanayandi	Charity Basaza Mulenga
24	Ibanda University	Venansius Baryamureeba	Emmanuel Karooro

== See also ==
- Education in Uganda
- List of universities in Uganda
- List of law schools in Uganda
- List of medical schools in Uganda
- List of business schools in Uganda
