= David Kibikyo =

Ugandan academic administrator

- Born: Uganda
- Citizenship: Uganda
- Education: Makerere University (BSc in Economics) (MA in Economics); Kampala International University (Master of Laws); Roskilde University (PhD in Economics)
- Occupation: Academic Administrator
- Years active: 1980–present
- Known for: Academics
- Title: Vice Chancellor; Busoga University

David Lameck Kibikyo is an economist, academic and academic administrator in Uganda. He is the current Vice Chancellor of Busoga University, a private university. He was appointed in 2014, replacing Professor Christopher Bakwesegha, who retired.

== Background and education ==
He holds he degrees of Bachelor of Science in Economics and Master of Arts in Economic Policy and Planning, both from Makerere University, the oldest and largest public university in Uganda. He also holds the degree of Master of Laws in Public International Law, obtained from Kampala International University. His degree of Doctor of Philosophy in Economics was obtained from Roskilde University in Denmark.

== Career ==
Prior to his current position, he served as an associate professor in charge of Research and Quality Assurance at the Kigali Institute of Management. Prior to that, he served as director, at the same institution. In the past, he served as the dean of the School of Economics and Applied Statistics at Kampala International University. Before that, he served as the deputy principal of the College of Economics and Business at the same university.

== See also ==
- Uganda Education
- Ugandan Academics
- Ugandan Universities
- Uganda Law Schools
- Uganda Bus. Schools
