= List of medical schools in Uganda =

This is a list of medical schools in Uganda:

Number	School	Location	Affiliation	Courses	Foundation	Private/public
1	Makerere University School of Medicine	Mulago	Makerere University	MBChB, MMed, MPH, DSc, MD, PhD	1924	Public
2	Mbarara University School of Medicine	Mbarara	Mbarara University	MBChB, MMed, PhD	1989	Public
3	Gulu University School of Medicine	Gulu	Gulu University	MBChB, MMed, PhD	2004	Public
4	IHK Postgraduate Medical School	Namuwongo	International Health Sciences University	BSc, BBA, MSc	2008	Private
5	Kampala International University School of Health Sciences	Ishaka	Kampala International University	MBChB, MSc, MMed	2004	Private
6	Uganda Martyrs University School of Medicine	Nsambya	Uganda Martyrs University	MMed	2010	Private
7	King Ceasor University College of Health, Medical & Life Sciences	Mulago & Kisoro	King Ceasor University	MBChB, DCM (Dip. Clin. Med.)	2012	Private
8	Busitema University School of Medicine	Mbale	Busitema University	MBChB, MMed (Med.), MPH	2013	Public
9	Habib Medical School	Kibuli	Islamic University in Uganda	MBChB	2014	Private
10	Soroti University School of Health Sciences	Soroti	Soroti University	MBChB	2016	Public
11	Kabale University School of Medicine	Kabale	Kabale University	MBChB, MMed, MPH	2015	Public
12	Uganda Christian University School of Medicine	Mengo Hill, Kampala	Uganda Christian University	MBChB, BDS, Bachelor of Public Health	2018	Private
13	Fort Portal College of Health Sciences	Fort Portal City	-	Diploma in Health Sciences	1965	Public
14	Lira University School of Medicine	Lira City	Lira University	MBChB	2023	Public

== See also ==
- List of university leaders in Uganda
- List of universities in Uganda
- List of business schools in Uganda
- List of law schools in Uganda
- Medical school in Uganda
- Education in Uganda
