= Eriabu Lugujjo =

- Born: 1948 (age 77–78); Uganda
- Citizenship: Uganda
- Education: Makerere University (BSc in Electrical Engineering); California Institute of Technology (MSc in Electrical Engineering) (PhD in Electrical Engineering)
- Occupations: Academic & Academic Administrator
- Years active: 1969 — present
- Known for: Engineering and Academic Administration
- Title: Vice Chancellor; Ndejje University

Eriabu Lugujjo is an electrical engineer, academic and academic administrator. He is the current vice chancellor of Ndejje University, a private Christian university, which was licensed by the Uganda National Council for Higher Education, in 1992. He was appointed to that position in July 2012.

== Education ==
He holds a Bachelor of Science degree in Electrical Engineering, obtained in 1969, from Makerere University, Uganda's largest and oldest public university. He also holds a Master of Science degree in Electrical Engineering, obtained in 1971, from the California Institute of Technology, in Pasadena. His Doctorate in Electrical Engineering was obtained in 1974, also from Caltech.

== Work history ==
Soon after graduating from Makerere University, he joined the Faculty of Engineering as a teaching assistant in 1969. He rose through the ranks, eventually becoming the Head of the Department of Electrical Engineering. From 1981 until 1989, he was the dean of the Faculty of Technology at Makerere. He has been associated with the United Nations Educational, Scientific and Cultural Organization (UNESCO) since 1983. For a period of eight years, he served as a member of UNESCO's executive board. He is the current chairperson of the Industrial Training Council, established to guide technical and vocational education in Uganda.

== See also ==
- Uganda Universities
- UG Business schools
- UG University Leaders
- UG Law Schools
- Uganda Education
