= Pen-Mogi Nyeko =

- Born: 12 May 1948 (age 78); Uganda
- Citizenship: Uganda
- Education: Makerere University (Bachelor of Veterinary Medicine) (Doctor of Philosophy); University of Nairobi (Master of Science)
- Occupations: Veterinarian, academic and academic administrator
- Years active: since 1987
- Known for: Academics
- Title: Chancellor; Mbarara University

Jack H. Pen-Mogi Nyeko is a Ugandan veterinarian, academic and academic administrator. He is the Chancellor of Mbarara University of Science and Technology (MUST), since 23 October 2025. He previously served as vice chancellor of Gulu University, a public university in northern Uganda.

== Background and education ==
He was born in the Northern Region of Uganda on 12 May 1948. He graduated from Makerere University in 1975 with a Bachelor of Veterinary Medicine degree. In 1981, he graduated from the University of Nairobi with a Master of Science degree. His Doctor of Philosophy was obtained from Makerere University in 1988. His field of specialization is molecular parasitology.

== Career ==
He started his career in 1987, as a Principal Research Entomologist, in the Uganda Tsetse Control Department, working there until 1991. From 1993 until 1996, he worked as a Senior Lecturer in the Faculty of Veterinary Medicine, Department of Veterinary Parasitology, at Makerere University. In 1994, he was nominated by the President of Uganda to become a delegate of the Constituent Assembly, which wrote and ratified the 1995 Ugandan Constitution. From 1996 until 2001, he was a member of parliament, representing Kilak County, Gulu District.

In 2001 a Technical Task Force was appointed to set up Gulu University. Professor Nyeko was appointed chairman of that four-person task force. When the university opened in 2002, he became the founding vice chancellor of the institution; the third public university to be established in the country. In October 2025, he was installed as Chancellor of Mbarara University, replacing Professor Charles Mark Lwanga Olweny who served in that capacity from 2017 until 2025.

== Other responsibilities ==
Pen-Mogi Nyeko has served in the following roles:

- Chairman of Uganda's National Environment Management Authority since 2013.
- Chairperson of the 18-person Uganda National Council for Higher Education since 2012.
- Member of the Uganda National Examinations Board since 2002.

== Personal life ==
Nyeko is a married father of five adult children. He is a Fellow of the Uganda National Academy of Sciences.

== See also ==
- List of university leaders in Uganda

== Succession table as chancellor of Mbarara University ==
Preceded by Charles Mark Lwanga Olweny	Chancellor of Mbarara University; 2025 –	Succeeded by Incumbent

== Succession table as vice chancellor of Gulu University ==
Preceded by None	Vice Chancellor of Gulu University; 2002–2018	Succeeded by George Openjuru (Incumbent)
