= Arthur Sserwanga =

Ugandan accountant and academic administrator

- Born: 20 June 1971 (age 55); Uganda
- Citizenship: Uganda
- Education: Makerere University Business School (Bachelor of Business Administration) (Master of Science in accounting and finance) (Doctor of Philosophy in entrepreneurship); Kyambogo University (Diploma in education)
- Occupations: Professor at Makerere University business school, accountant & academic administrator
- Years active: 1994–present
- Known for: Academics
- Title: Prof.

Arthur Sserwanga is a Ugandan accountant, academic, and academic administrator. He was appointed Vice Chancellor of Muteesa I Royal University in September 2014, a private university in Uganda. He previously served as the dean of the Faculty of Commerce at Makerere University Business School (MUBS).

== Education ==
He obtained a Diploma in Education in 1994 from the Institute of Teacher Education Kyambogo, a precursor to Kyambogo University. He also holds the degree of Bachelor of Business Administration, obtained from MUBS in 1998. His degree of Master of Science in Accounting and Finance was obtained in 2001 from MUBS. His degree of Doctor of Philosophy in Entrepreneurship was obtained in 2010, also from MUBS.

== Work history ==
Sserwanga is a professor at Makerere University Business School.Sserwanga's first job, from 1994 until 1998, was as an instructor at the City Institute of Business Studies in Kampala, Uganda's capital and largest city. From 1998 until 1999, he worked as a Graduate fellow in the Faculty of Commerce at MUBS. From 1999 until 2003, he was an assistant lecturer, and from 2003 until 2006, he was a lecturer, in the department of accounting. Between 2004 and 2014, he held different positions at MUBS, including: (a) head of the department of accounting – 2004 to 2008 (b) director, Directorate for Vocational and Distance Education – 2008 to 2009 (c) dean, Faculty of Vocational and Distance Education – 2009 to 2011 and (d) dean, Faculty of Commerce – 2011 to 2014. In September 2014, he was appointed to become vice chancellor at Muteesa I Royal University.

== Other considerations ==
Sserwanga is a married father and of the Christian faith.

== See also ==
- List of universities in Uganda
- List of business schools in Uganda
- List of university leaders in Uganda
