= Uganda National Entrepreneurship Development Institute =

Non-profit educational institution in Kampala, Uganda

Coordinates: 00°19′35″N 32°36′00″E

- Other names: UNEDI
- Motto: Enhancing, Developing and Growing Entrepreneurs
- Type: Private
- Established: 2000
- Chairperson: Samuel Niiwo
- Chancellor: Professor Gerard T. Caneba
- Location: Kampala, Uganda
- Campus: Urban
- Website: www.unedicampus.com

The Uganda National Entrepreneurship Development Institute (UNEDI) is a privately owned national resource development institution in Uganda whose focus area is entrepreneurship education, training and research. The institute provides training techniques, faculty support, consultancy, research as well as teaching and development of entrepreneurship training materials.

== Background ==
=== History ===
UNEDI was established in 2000 by Samuel Niiwo Center for Humanity and Sustainable Development (SNC) as a national resource development institute with a tripartite training program between the SNC and the African Investment Management and Funds Association (AIMFA).

=== Aims of the Institute ===
UNEDI’s institutional aims are:

- Creating a multiplier effect on opportunities for self-employment;
- Augmenting the supply of competent entrepreneurs through training with focus on technical and vocational training (BTVET);
- Augmenting the supply of entrepreneur trainer-motivators;
- Participating in institutional building and National Development efforts;
- Inculcating the spirit of 'Entrepreneurship' in the youth;
- Promoting micro enterprise development with particular emphasis to rural communities;
- Developing and disseminating new knowledge and insights in entrepreneurial theory and practice through research;
- Facilitating corporate excellence through creating entrepreneurs;
- Improving managerial capabilities of small, Medium and Micro-enterprises;
- Developing the support system to facilitate potential and existing entrepreneurs establish and manage their enterprises; and
- Collaborating with similar organizations in Uganda and the rest of the world to accomplish its objectives.

== Centers ==
As of August 2015, UNEDI was structured into the following centers:

1. The Center for Youth Empowerment, Job Creation and Employment (YEJEC) ; for youth-focused programmes.
2. The Center for Entrepreneurship and Economic Development (CEED) ; for entrepreneurship related programmes.
3. The Center for Rural Economy, Entrepreneurship and Cooperative Extension Cooperative Extension Services (CREECES) ; UNEDI’s research, training and education arm.
4. The Center for Advancement of Natural Resource Management (CANAREMA) ; for programmes related to enterprise development through natural resource use and conservation.
5. The Center for Agribusiness Research and Rural Innovations (CARRI) ; for research-based consultancy geared towards promoting agriculture as a mainstream business activity.
6. The Center for Leadership, Governance and Management (CLGM); for leadership and governance related programmes.
7. The UNEDI IT Academy; for hands on training in Information Technology and Entrepreneurship programmes.
8. The Center for Air Travel, Tourism and Hospitality Industry (CATHI) ;
9. The Center for Innovative Cinema, Film and Music Industry (CIFAMI) ;
10. The Center for Advancement of Nutrition and Medical Research (CANMR);
11. The Center for Cosmetology, Hairdressing and Modeling Industry (CCHAMI) ; for specialized job skills courses.
12. The Center for Energy, Applied Science and Technologies (CEAT) .

== Specialized projects ==
As of August 2015, UNEDI has the following specialized projects:

- The Village Entrepreneurship Learning Associations (VELA) project which seeks to apply Social Entrepreneurship as a means in Advancing Equality, Tolerance and Peace thus promote civic existence, expression & engagement.
- The Strategy for Technology Advancement and Resource Transfer (START-UGANDA) project delivers appropriate farm technologies that promote sustainable food and farming systems through Rural Farm Entrepreneurship Education, Training and Networking Opportunities.
- The Exposure through Volunteerism, Opportunity Spotting to Kindle Employment (EVOKE); a program which helps continuing students in higher institutions of learning to get short term job placement, internships and volunteer opportunities within Small, medium and micro-enterprises so as to build practical experience, hence get job placements thus reduce unemployment and curb poverty.
- The Youth Entrepreneurship Achievers Program (YEAP); whose aim is to successfully launch and establish entrepreneurship in the minds of young people to effectively implement high quality entrepreneurship programs in a number of schools and trading centers by time frame.

== See also ==
- List of Business Schools in Uganda
- List of universities in Uganda
- Education in Uganda
