= Nsaka University =

Private university in Uganda

- Motto: "Education from the source"
- Type: Private
- Established: 2009
- Location: Mafubira, Jinja, Uganda; 00°27′56″N 33°12′21″E
- Campus: Urban
- Website: Homepage
- Location in Uganda

Nsaka University (NSU) is a private university in Uganda.

== Location ==
The university campus sits on a 11.04 hectares (27.3 acres) site, located at Mafubira, a neighborhood in the city of Jinja, off the Jinja-Kamuli Road. Mafubira is approximately 8 kilometres (5.0 mi) north of the central business district of Jinja. The coordinates of Nsaka University Campus are 0°27'56.0"N, 33°12'21.0"E (Latitude:0.465556; Longitude:33.205833).

== History ==
The university opened on 13 January 2009 with 20 undergraduate students. The institution was given provisional accreditation by the Uganda National Council for Higher Education in 2013.

== Academic courses ==
As of March 2015, the following courses were offered at Nsaka University:

=== Undergraduate degree courses ===
- Bachelor of Procurement and Logistics Management.
- Bachelor of Business Administration.
- Bachelor of Arts in Education.
- Bachelor of Information Technology.
- Bachelor of Business Computing.
- Bachelor of Guidance and Counselling.
- Bachelor of Mass Communication.
- Bachelor of Human Resource Management.
- Bachelor of Public Administration.
- Bachelor of Community Development and Adult Education.

=== Diploma courses ===
- Diploma in Business Administration.
- Diploma in Procurement and Logistics Management.
- Diploma in Accounting and Finance.
- Diploma in Computing and Networking.
- Diploma in Community Development.
- Diploma in Information Technology.
- Diploma in Mass Communication.
- Diploma in Counseling & Guidance.
- Diploma in Education.

== See also ==
- Jinja District
- Education in Uganda
- List of universities in Uganda
- List of Business Schools in Uganda
- Ugandan university leaders
- List of university leaders in Uganda
