= List of law schools in Uganda =

This is a list of accredited institutions offering law courses in Uganda, as of October 2014.

List of law schools in Uganda
Number	School	Affiliation	Courses	Private/public
1	Makerere University School of Law	Makerere University	LLB, LLM & LLD	Public
2	Bishop Stuart University, Faculty of Law	Bishop Stuart University	LLB	Private
3	International University of East Africa Faculty of Law	IUEA	LLB	Private
4	Gulu University, Faculty of Law	Gulu University	LLB	Public
5	Cavendish University Uganda, Faculty of Law	Cavendish University Uganda	LLB & LLM	Private
6	Islamic University in Uganda, Faculty of Law	Islamic University in Uganda	LLB&LLM	Private
7	Kampala International University, Faculty of Law	Kampala International University	LLB	Private
8	Kampala University, Faculty of Law	Kampala University	LLB	Private
9	Nkumba University, School of Law	Nkumba University	LLB & BCJ	Private
10	Kabale University, Faculty of Law	Kabale University	LLB	Public
11	Uganda Christian University, Faculty of Law	Uganda Christian University	LLB	Private
12	Uganda Pentecostal University, Faculty of Law	Uganda Pentecostal University	LLB	Private
13	Law Development Centre	N/A	Diploma in Legal Practice, Diploma in Law & Diploma in Human Rights	Public
14	St. Augustine International University, Faculty of Law	St. Augustine International University	LLB	Private

== See also ==
- Education in Uganda
- List of business schools in Uganda
- List of law firms in Uganda
- List of medical schools in Uganda
- List of universities in Uganda
