= Nafiu Lukman Abiodun =

Nigerian Academic

- Education: University of Ilorin (PhD, Statistics)
- Occupations: Academician, economist, statistician
- Employer: Kabale University (suspended in 2022)

Nafiu Lukman Abiodun is a Nigerian academic, economist and statistician. He was indefinitely suspended from Kabale University in 2022 after being found guilty of sexually harassing students at the university.

== Career and education ==
Abiodun holds a PhD in Statistics from the University of Ilorin in Nigeria. In 2022, he served as the director of Research at Kabale University. He also headed the Department of Economics and Statistics in the Faculty of Economics and Management Sciences.

== Controversy ==
Abiodun was accused of demanding sexual favours from female students. On November 11, 2022, a letter from the University Secretary Canon Johnson Munono Byaryantuma confirmed that he was guilty of the said allegations, including sexual harassment, failure to follow examination regulations and professional guidance. In the letter, Byaryantuma stated that Abiodun's contract would not be renewed upon its expiration.
