= All Saints University =

Private university in Uganda

All Saints University Lango (ASUL)
- Motto: "Enlightenment with Godliness"
- Type: Private
- Established: 2008
- Chancellor: Prof. Andrew Anthony Cula'
- Administrative staff: 26+ (2010)
- Students: 300+ (2010)
- Location: Lira, Uganda; 02°14′46″N 32°53′59″E
- Campus: Urban
- Website: Homepage
- Location in Uganda

All Saints University, whose complete name is All Saints University Lango (ASUL), is a private university in Uganda. It is recognised as a university by the Uganda National Council for Higher Education (UNCHE).

== Location ==
ASUL is located on Adoko Road, in the southeastern part of the city of Lira, in Lira District, Northern Region, approximately 320 kilometres (200 mi), by road, north of Kampala, Uganda's capital and largest city. The coordinates of the university campus are 2°14'46.0"N, 32°53'59.0"E (Latitude:2.246111; Longitude:32.899722).

== History ==
ASUL was founded in 2008 by the Diocese of Lango of the Church of Uganda. Although the founders and administrators of the university are Christians, the university admits students without regard to nationality, religious beliefs, or ethnicity. The first class of 90 undergraduate students was admitted in January 2009. The courses taught at the university are accredited by UNCHE.

== Recent developments ==
In April 2014, Vice Chancellor Fred Opio Ekong died from injuries sustained during an automobile accident.

== Academics ==
As of January 2015, ASUL maintained three faculties:

- Faculty of Business Administration and Management
- Faculty of Social Science
- Faculty of Education

== Courses ==
The following degree courses are offered at ASUL:

=== Faculty of Business Administration and Management ===
- Bachelor of Business Administration and Management
- Bachelor of Entrepreneurship and Small Business Management

=== Faculty of Education ===
- Bachelor of Primary Education
- Bachelor of Secondary Education

=== Faculty of Social Sciences ===
- Bachelor of Arts in social sciences
- Bachelor of Social Work and Social Administration
- Bachelor of Arts in Project Planning and Management

In addition to the degree courses, the university offers many diploma and certificate courses in the same or related fields.

== See also ==
- List of universities in Uganda
- Education in Uganda
- List of Ugandan university leaders
