= Uganda Christian University School of Medicine =

Medical school in Kampala, Uganda

- Type: Private
- Established: May 2017; 9 years ago
- Affiliations: Uganda Christian University
- Dean: Dr. Gerald Tumusiime
- Students: ~ 70
- Undergraduates: ~ 70
- Location: Mengo Hill, Kampala, Uganda; 0.313045°N 32.558065°E
- Campus: Urban
- Location in Kampala

Uganda Christian University School of Medicine, also UCU School of Medicine or UCU Medical School, is a medical school in Uganda. The school is based at Mengo Hospital and includes a faculty of dentistry.

In February 2018, the Uganda National Council for Higher Education (UNCHE), gave the university a letter of accreditation for three new medical courses (a) Bachelor of Medicine and Bachelor of Surgery, (b) Bachelor of Dental Surgery and (c) Bachelor of Public Health. The three courses will be offered at the new Uganda Christian University School of Medicine, starting in August 2018.

== Overview ==
In December 2016, UCU signed a memorandum of understanding with Mengo Hospital, to establish the faculty of medicine of the university, with its base at the hospital and with the hospital, as the teaching institution of the medical school.

The medical school maintains its offices, laboratories, lecture-rooms and students hostels, on the hospital premises. The original start date was May 2017, pending accreditation by the UNCHE. Initially, a total of 70 undergraduate students will be admitted, 50 in the MBChB programme and 20 in the Bachelor of Dental Surgery track.

The UNCHE approved the medical school's curriculum in March 2017, and gave final approval to three undergraduate courses in March 2018.

The school expects to attract candidates from Uganda and the neighboring countries of Kenya, Tanzania and Rwanda. The pioneer class of the medical school is expected to enroll in August/September 2018.

== Pioneer class ==
The pioneer class of 62 students began attending classes on Friday 14 September 2018. The students were nationals of Eritrea, Kenya, Nigeria, Sudan, Tanzania and Uganda. In August 2023, that pioneer class now whittled down to 53, graduated with the degree of Bachelor of Medicine and Surgery (MBChB) (44 graduates) and the degree of Bachelor of Dental Surgery (BDS) (9 graduates).

== See also ==
- Uganda Christian University
- List of medical schools in Uganda
