= George Openjuru =

Ugandan educator and academic administrator

- Born: 1 January 1965 (age 61); Uganda
- Citizenship: Uganda
- Education: Makerere University (Bachelor of Arts with Education) (Master of Education); University of KwaZulu-Natal (Master of Education in Adult Education) (Doctor of Philosophy in Education)
- Occupation: Vice Chancellor of Gulu University
- Known for: Professional competence
- Title: Vice Chancellor of Gulu University

George Ladaah Openjuru, also George Ladaah Openjuru, is a Ugandan educator, academic and academic administrator, who serves as the Vice Chancellor of Gulu University, a public university in the Northern Region of Uganda, since 13 January 2018.

== Background and education ==
Openjuru was born in the Northern Region of Uganda. After attending local primary and secondary schools, he was admitted to Makerere University, the oldest university in East Africa.

He holds a Bachelor of Arts with Education and a Master of Education, both awarded by Makerere University, in Uganda. His third degree is a Master of Education in Adult Education awarded by the University of KwaZulu-Natal, in South Africa. His Doctor of Philosophy in Adult Education was also obtained from the University of KwaZulu-Natal.

== Career ==
Openjuru was first appointed as a lecturer at Makerere University in July 1991. In February 2011, he was promoted to senior lecturer. He became Associate Professor of Adult Education on 1 January 2013. In September 2014, he was appointed Associate Professor of Education at Gulu University. He became full Professor of Education at Gulu University in September 2016. Most of his adult teaching life has been spent in university education, with emphasis on adult education. At the time Professor Openjuru left Makerere University, he was the Dean of the School of Lifelong Learning in the College of Education and External Studies.

From October 2014 until December 2014, he served as Acting Deputy Vice-Chancellor at Gulu University. He was confirmed as substantive First Deputy Vice-Chancellor in January 2015. As Vice-Chancellor, he replaced Professor Jack H. Pen-Mogi Nyeko, the founding Vice-Chancellor who had been serving in acting capacity since 15 January 2017, when his contract expired.

== Academic Authorship ==
He has also been involved in extensive research especially about vocational education and some these publications include; Despite knowledge democracy and community-based participatory action research: Voices from the global south and excluded north still missing. This study drew attention and raised debate about knowledge exclusion and alternative forms of knowing in the global South as well as to bring to the fore the perspective of authors from the global South. Christianity and rural community literacy practices in Uganda. The article examined how Christianity provides the impetus for local literacy practices in a rural community in Uganda. Government Education Policies and the Problem of Early School Leaving: The case of Uganda. This book chapter examined government education policies in Uganda in relation to the problems of early school leavers. Motivations for participation in higher education: narratives of non-traditional students at Makerere University in Uganda. The study established motivations for participation of non-traditional students (NTS) in university education. Hollywood in Uganda: local appropriation of trans-national English-language movies. The study investigated access to English-language Hollywood movies in Uganda by way of an ethnographic audience study carried out in slum areas of the city of Kampala. Towards a conceptual framework for developing capabilities of ‘new’ types of students participating in higher education in Sub-Saharan Africa. The study contributed to the public discourse on theoretical considerations for guidance of empirical research on participation of non-traditional students (NTS) in higher education in Sub-Saharan Africa (SSA). A comparative study of the FAL and REFLECT adult literacy facilitators' training process in Uganda.The study called for serious attention to be given to the training of adult literacy facilitators to ensure that only qualified people are entrusted with the work of teaching adult literacy. Gender and Transformative Education in East Africa. Transitioning Vocational Education and training in Africa: A social skills ecosystem perspective. Indigenous knowledge: Informal learning and food security practices among the Acholi people of Northern Uganda. Indeed the book chapter elaborates about how food security can be achieved through the revitalization of indigenous knowledge among the Acholi people of Northern Uganda. The influence of out-of-institution environments on the university schooling project of non-traditional students in Uganda. This study drew from the life-world environment component of Donaldson and Graham’s model of college outcomes for adults African Literacies: Ideologies, Scripts, Education. Shack video halls in Uganda as youth community/literacy learning and cultural interaction sites. The study examined the learning and cultural interaction opportunities that occur in the production of and participation in watching interpreted movies. Learning informally: A case for Arts learning in vocational education and training in Uganda. The paper advocated for the inclusion of the arts in vocational learning programs in Uganda, as an integrated form of holistic learning oriented towards empowerment and entrepreneurship. Uganda. This a study about older adult education in Uganda, the development of suitable educational facilities for their education and funding from government to implement educational programmes that are targeted at them.

== See also ==
- Paul Waako
