= Mondo Kagonyera =

George Mondo Kagonyera
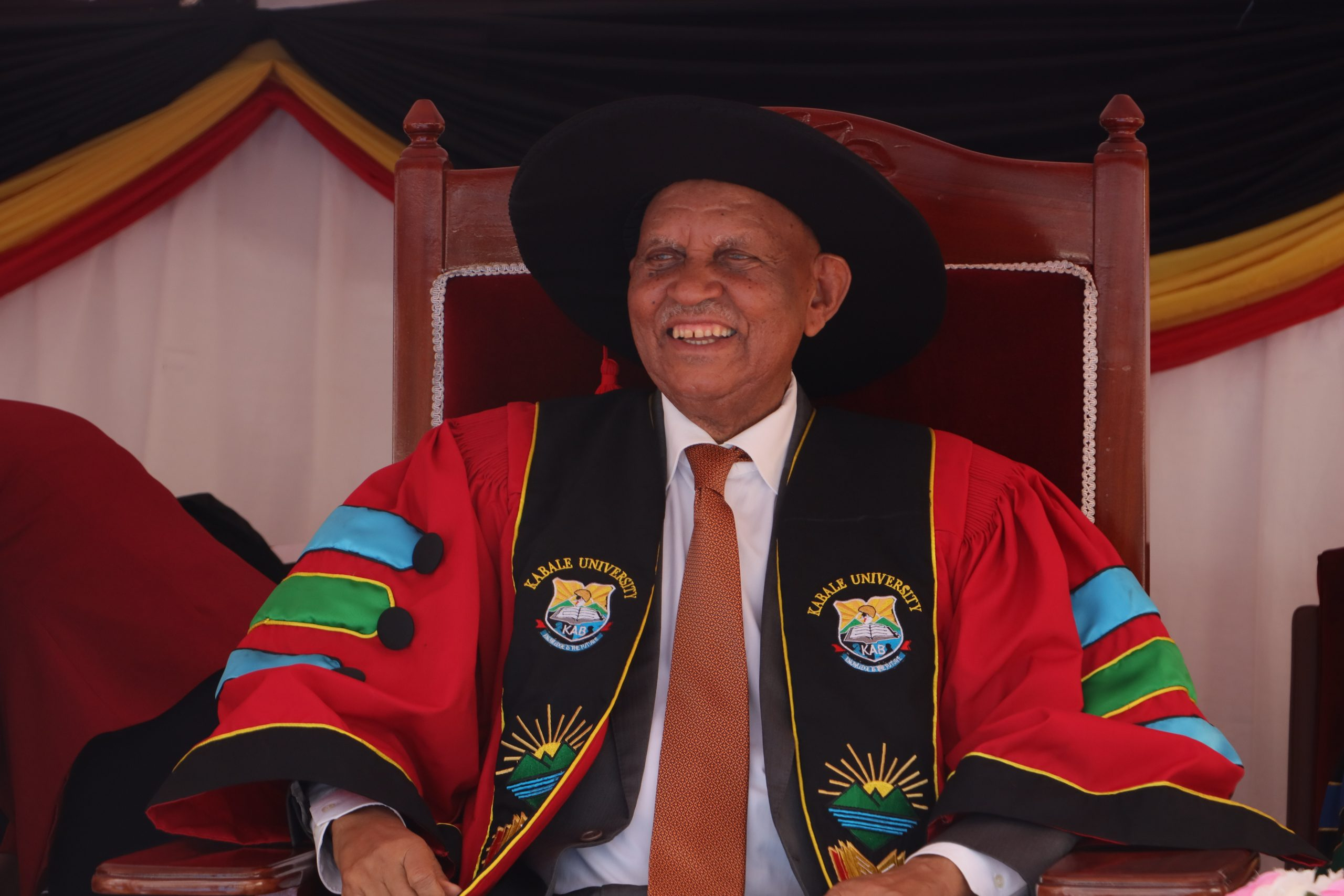
- Born: 1941 (age 84–85); Uganda
- Citizenship: Uganda
- Education: Nairobi University (Bachelor of Veterinary Medicine); University of California Davis (Master of Science) (Doctor of Philosophy)
- Occupations: Politician, veterinarian, academic, university administrator
- Years active: 1960 — present
- Known for: academics, academic administration
- Title: Chancellor of Makerere University

George Mondo Kagonyera, also Mondo Kagonyera, is a Ugandan veterinarian, politician, academic, and university administrator. He is a former chancellor of Makerere University, the oldest and largest university in Uganda. He was appointed to the position of Makerere University Chancellor in 2007 by President Yoweri Museveni. After serving a full four year-term, he was re-appointed for another term in 2011, and was re-installed in January 2012. He was also the first chancellor of Kabale University as a public university.

== Background and education ==
Kagonyera was born in Kabuga Village, Rukungiri District, in the Western Region of Uganda, circa 1941, to Zakaria Kagonyera and Elizabeth Kirihura. He attended Kigezi College Butobere for his O-Level studies, before he was admitted to Royal College Nairobi for his A-Level education. He studied at the University of Nairobi, graduating with the degree of Bachelor of Veterinary Medicine in the early 1960s. Later, he went on to obtain a Master of Science in Veterinary Medicine, from the University of California Davis, followed by a Doctor of Philosophy in Comparative Pathology from the same institution.

== Work experience ==
In 1967, he worked as a District Veterinary Officer for Masaka district for about five months which job he dropped to go for further studies. In 1971, following graduation from the University of California with his Master of Science degree, Kagonyera joined Makerere University as a lecturer. He was instrumental in establishing the Faculty of Veterinary Medicine, which has since morphed into the College of Veterinary Medicine, Animal Resources & BioSecurity. He also served as the Chairperson of the Appointments Board from 1993 until 1999. He left the university to join Ugandan politics in 1998. He has also served as Senior Presidential Advisor on politics in the Kigezi Region.

As a politician, he served as the Member of Parliament for Rubabo constituency in Rukungiri District and as a minister for general duties in the office of the prime minister. He also served as the deputy managing director of the Ugandan National Social Security Fund from 2006 until 2008.

On 23 October 2007, Prof. Kagonyera was appointed Chancellor of Makerere University by President Museveni in which he served a full four year term. In 2011, He was reappointed for another term on 24 October 2011, and was re-installed on 12 January 2012. His second term of office ended on 23 October 2015 and was subsequently appointed the Chancellor of Kabale University in November 2016. On 2021, he was reappointed for another four year term which officially concluded on 28 April 2025.

He is currently the Chancellor of Kampala University, East African University Rwanda and The East African University Kenya(TEAU).

== See also ==
- Education in Uganda
- Ugandan university leaders
- List of universities in Uganda

== Succession table as Chancellor of Makerere University ==
Preceded by Apolo Nsibambi; 2003 - 2007	Chancellor of Makerere University; 23 October 2007 - 23 October 2015	Succeeded by Ezra Suruma; 2016-2023

== Succession table as Chancellor of Kabale University ==
Preceded by George Kanyeihamba; 2002-2015	Chancellor of Kabale University; 2016-2025	Succeeded by Canon Mathew Rukikaire; Incumbent
