= Vienna College Namugongo =

International School

Vienna College Namugongo is an international school operating in Uganda, Kenya, Burundi, Tanzania and United States of America. The school is registered under the Ministry of Education and Sports of Uganda. The school teaches the British Curriculum of Cambridge International Extermination syllabus with Reg No. UG010 to all its students. The school has an enrolment of at least 400 students. The school is located in Wakiso district along Namugongo road.

== Co-curricular activities ==
Vienna College Namugongo has sporting facilities to accommodate major activities like table tennis, badminton, aerobic and swimming. The school holds graduation ceremonies for students to progress to other levels of education. The school also participates in national championships like the National Schools Basketball championships.

== Controversies ==
The school is an academic institution that disciplines its students and take action on reported indiscipline cases. In 2023, cases of bullying, illicit drug consumption among others were seen to be on the rise. The school held a meeting with parents to set measures that protect children from harmful behaviors, a move to instill discipline in the students.

== See also ==
- Education in Uganda
- Taibah College School
- Gayaza High School
