= LivingStone International University =

Private university in Uganda

LivingStone International University (LIU)
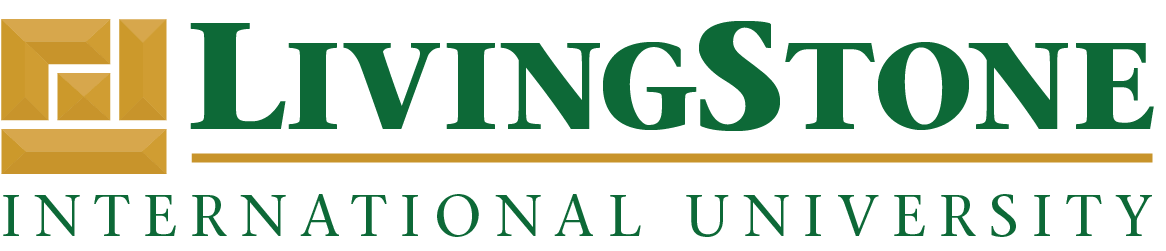
- Motto: Building the Nations of Africa
- Type: Private
- Established: 2012
- Vice-Chancellor: Dr. Buregea Bin Rwakenda Henri
- Location: Plot 563, Nyanza South - Kamonkoli Mugiti S/C, Budaka District, Uganda
- Campus: Urban
- Website: www.livingstone.ac.ug

LivingStone International University (LIU) is a private non-profit Christian University established in Mbale Uganda. The vision come from the missionaries of the New Testament Churches of Christ who saw the need to have a greater influence through education so that communities can be improved for Christ.

== Location ==
LIU is located outside Mbale at Plot 563, Nyanza South – Kamonkoli Mugiti S/C, Budaka District. The coordinates of LIU are 1°04'26.0"N, 34°06'54.0"E (Latitude: 1.0793922; Longitude: 34.109314).

The new fifty-acre campus is located just outside Mbale municipality on the main road that goes west toward Kampala. A campus master plan has been developed for the eventual construction of a campus that will serve 4,000 students. The coordinates of the permanent university campus entrance are: 1°04'26.0"N, 34°06'54.0"E (Latitude: 1.0793922; Longitude: 34.109314).

== History ==
LIU was granted a letter of interim authority by the Uganda National Council for Higher education to begin operating in 2008. In Mbale 2010, after vigorous inspections and interviews, a provisional license was granted, which authorizes LIU to admit students and issue degrees. The process of acquiring the Charter is in progress. All degrees have been accredited by the NCHE and we look forward to the future expansion as God provides.

LivingStone International University is seeking to transform Africa through quality Christ-centered Higher education and the LIU vision is taking shape rapidly with much work to be done at the already 56 acres of land which have been acquired in a key location on the Mbale to Jinja highways near Mbale.

The permanent campus plan development is made up of modern, pristine buildings as part of master plan designed by Engineering Ministries International to accommodate student growth to 4,000 over 15 years. The university opened the doors to its first class on January 16, 2012.

LivingStone International University is an accredited Christian university in Uganda. It is religious and explicitly Christian in its name, in its mission statement, and in its scripture: 1Peter 2:4-5.

== Academics ==
LIU offers both bachelors and diploma programs in five schools. The five schools are: School of Business, School of Christian Ministry; School of Education, School of Computing and Information Technology, School of Media Technology & School of Agriculture. . The university also offers a certificate course in networking (Cisco CCNA) and security which takes six to nine months, English as a Second Language for students who come from countries whose official language is not English for six months among other short term courses.

As of July 2025, LIU offered the following undergraduate courses

School of Computing & I.T

- Bachelor of Science in Information Technology
- Bachelor of Science in Information Systems
- Diploma in Information Technology
- Certificate in Information Technology

School of Journalism & Media

- Bachelor of Science in Journalism & Media Technology
- Diploma in Media Technology

School of Business & Administration

- Bachelor of Business Administration
- Diploma in Business Administration

School of Education

- Bachelor of Arts with Education
- Bachelor ofArts with Education with Kiswahili
- Diploma in Education Secondary

In-Service programs

- Bachelor of Primary Education - Arts
- Bachelor of Primary Education - Early Childhood
- Bachelor of Primary Education - Science

School of Christian Ministry

- Bachelor of Christian Ministry
- Diploma in Christian Ministry

School of Agriculture

- Bachelor of Science in Agribusiness

== Watch ==
Welcome to Livingstone International University

== See also ==
- List of universities in Uganda
- List of university leaders in Uganda
