= Kinaawa High School Kawempe =

Kinaawa High School - Kawempe Campus
- 0°23′27″N 32°33′27″E; Kawempe - Ttula, Kampala, Uganda, P.O Box 9093 Kampala - Uganda; Uganda

Information
- School type: Secondary School
- Motto: "We Learn To Excel"
- Religious affiliation: Islamic Foundation
- Established: 2007 (19 years ago)
- Status: Open
- Sister school: Kinaawa High School - Kyengera Mugongo - Kinaawa High School - Kasangati Campus
- School district: Kampala Division
- Head teacher: Hajji Serugo Muhammad Ali
- Education system: Ordinary Level - Advanced Ordinary Level - Islamic Study Setting
- Classes offered: "Senior One - Senior Six"
- Language: English, Arabic, Luganda, French
- Houses: Mbogo House | Makeera House | Kakungulu House | Kalema House
- Color: Dark Green - Brown- White
- Sports: Football | Badminton | Volleyball | Basketball | Netball | Chess | Karate | Music, Dance & Drama
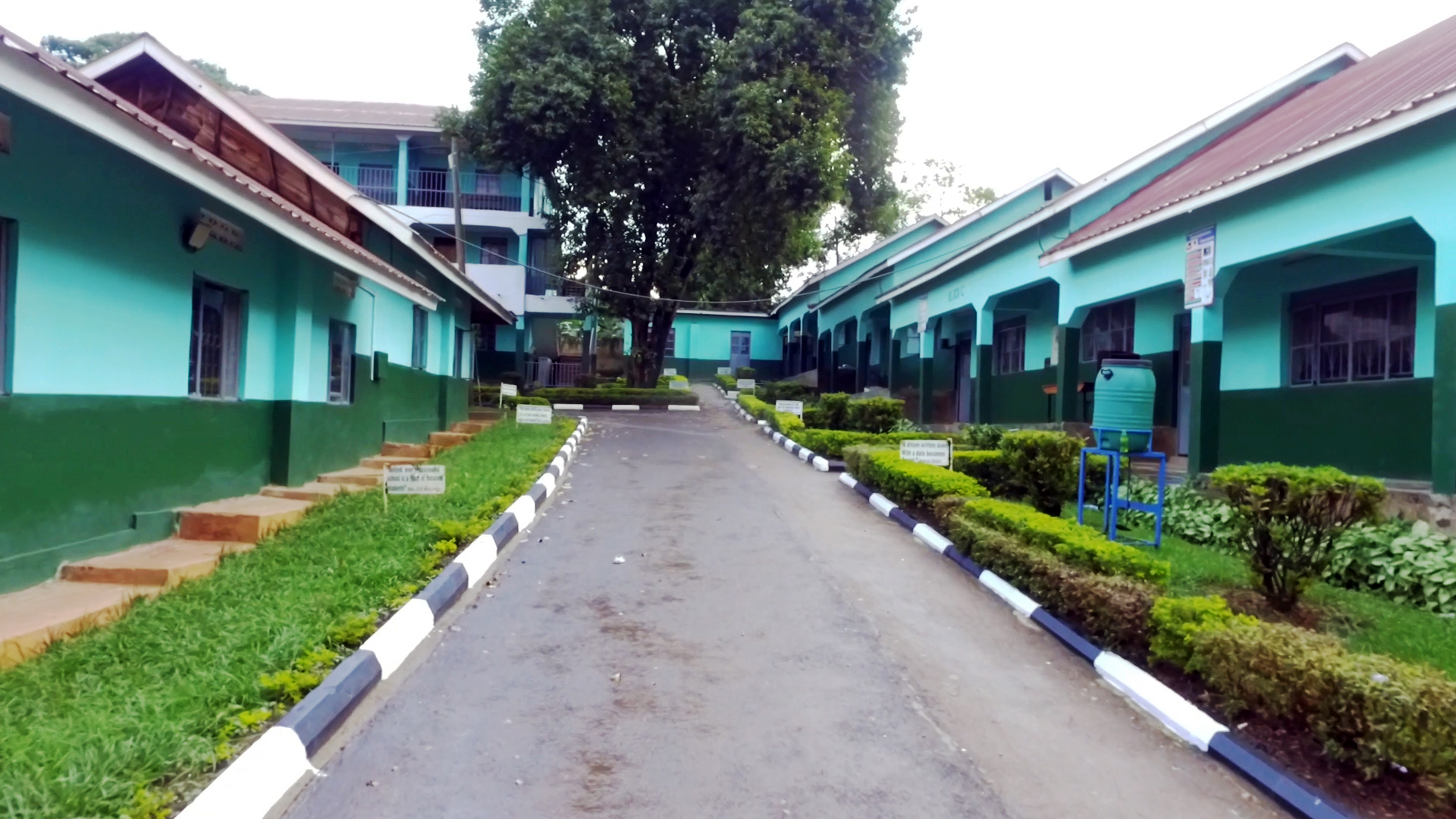

Kinaawa High School Kawempe Campus is a mixed, residential secondary school located at Kawempe Ttula 6 km off Bombo road, Kampala, Uganda. It is an Islamic Founded School established in 2007 from Kyengera Mugongo Campus by a group of former Kawempe Muslim teachers.

== Background ==
Kinaawa High School is owned by experienced Teachers from Kawempe Muslim secondary School. They started in 2000 taking Lady Fawe Academy that had collapsed which they transformed into Kinaawa High School - Mugongo Campus. then Kinaawa High School - Kawempe in 2007 and Kinaawa High School - Kasangati in 2012. In the new plan, there is a College in pipeline yet to be unveiled. These schools are both O and A level schools excelling in sports and Academics. The school is registered and classified by the ministry of education and sports as a mixed day and boarding “O” and “A” level school.

Kinaawa High School Kawempe is currently headed by Head Teacher Haji Sserugo Muhammad Ali. He joined the school in December 2015 from the Kyengera - Mugongo Campus. At Kawempe, he works with Mohamed Ssenyondo as his deputy.

=== Hajji Serugo Muhammad Ali. ===
Hajji Serugo attended Kabukunge Demonstrational School before joining Kawempe Muslim Secondary School attaining an O & A Level certificates. Later Joined Islamic University in Uganda for a Bachelor's Degree in Education where he became one of the top performers and was retained as a teaching assistant in the department of Geography.

In the year 2000, joined Makerere University for a Masters in Land Use and Regional Development Planning. While at Makerere, met the then headteacher at Kawempe Muslim Dr. Ibrahim Matovu who requested him to join Kawempe Muslim as a teacher.

While at Kawempe Muslim, Hajji Serugo met other figures who had impact on his career who included Ms. Milly Namayanja a nationally celebrated Geography teacher and his former teacher, Dr. Ibrahim Matovu a retired head teacher and Hajji Ahmed Kaweesa Sengendo who is his former rector of IUIU.

In that year, Hajji Serugo partnered with 12 other teachers from Kawempe Muslim to revive a collapsed school in Kyengera, formerly known as Lady Fawe Academy. Hajji Serugo was then requested by his colleagues to become the head teacher which caused him leave teaching job at IUIU however remained part timing at Kawempe Muslim as a teacher as well.

The school rebranded was rebranded to from Lady Fawe Academy to Kinaawa High School - Mugongo, changed the school uniform. A few years later, the school started achieving good academic results. The enrollment also improved from 260 students in 2003 to 1266 by 2015. The bought more land to expand the school.

In 2007, the group was again approached to take over a collapsing school in Kawempe. The group requested a member on the team Hajji Musa Kayiira to leave his teaching role and as a deputy Head teacher at Kawempe Muslim to join the school and was named their second branch as Kinaawa high school - Kawempe campus. Eight years later in 2015, Hajji Musa Kayiira resigned to pursue other interests. The board sat and decided to appoint Hajji Muhammed Serugo for the role for his success at Kyengera, Mugongo.

== Academics ==
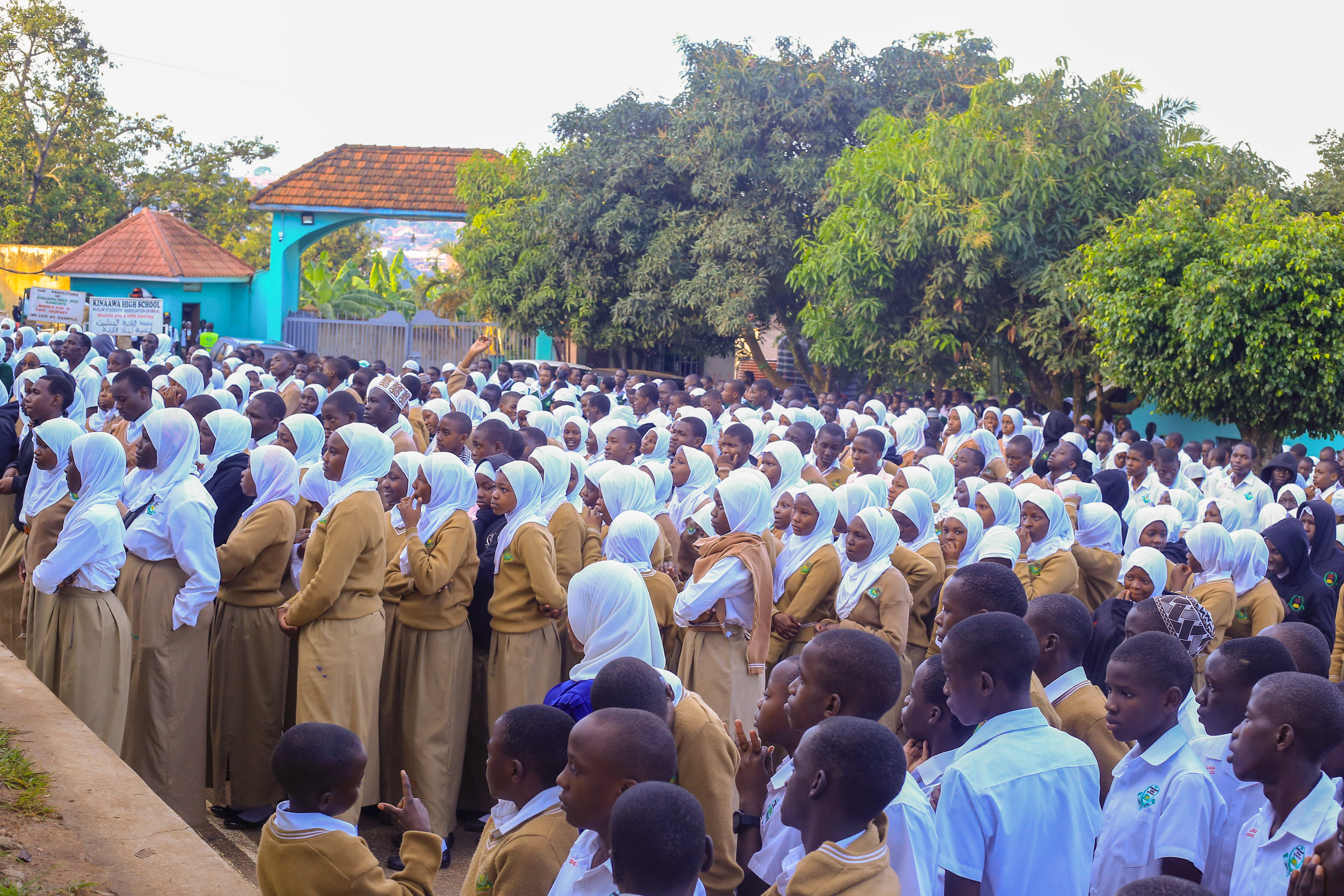
Students on Parade, 2023

In 2023 UCE exams, Kinaawa High School registered 99 first grades.

== Activities ==
Kinaawa High School - Kawempe Campus supports and empowers individual talents through;

- Music, Dance & Drama
- Sports

Football

Volleyball

Badminton

Kinaawa high clinched a bronze medal in the FEASSA Games 2023 organized in Huye, Rwanda after a 1-2-3 finish for Uganda in the Boys . In the 2023 City Badminton Challenge Cup, Kinaawa High produced a 17 year old Katungulu Alamandan as one of the 19 players that took part in the U19 category. Who was sported by the Head teacher after the 2019 edition from Mbale into coach Frank Muwuluzi's team captained by Mbowa Najib. Kinaawa was one of the schools that fielded 10 players under different categories.

While at the schools league 2024, Kinawa dominated the boys’ category of the Uganda Badminton Schools League, winning all four matches played and securing a decisive 12 points. The two boys from Mbale including Katungulu Alamandan and Kadoli Fredrick had good games in the competition with other signings in the structures like Mabuya Abdul Razak and Mutesasira Fredrick. Kinaawa won the league title and they secured second place in the 2023 National Schools Challenge and a third place in the 2023 East Africa Schools Challenge. Kinaawa were finalists of the USSSA National Badminton for boys, 2026 in Mukono beating Seroma Christian High School 3-2 on semi finals. On finals, the faced Kibuli Secondary School. During the UMEA Solidarity Games of 2026, hosted at Nkoma Secondary school in Mbale City, they were beaten by Kibuli Secondary School again in the girls category.

Basketball

Netball

- Fitness
  1. Karate
  2. judo

So long Kinaawa has been featuring in olympic Games and the last was in 2022 at Mbogo High. The school playgrounds for sports are being used by more than 10 schools in the neighborhood.

== See also ==
- Kawempe Muslim
- Kibuli Secondary School
