= Gulu University =

Public university in Uganda

Gulu University (GU)
- Motto: "For Community Transformation"
- Type: Public
- Established: 2002
- Chancellor: Dr Ruhakana Rugunda,,
- Vice-Chancellor: George Openjuru
- Administrative staff: 441 (2019)
- Students: ~4,500+ (2019)
- Location: Gulu, Uganda; 02°47′18″N 32°19′01″E
- Campus: Urban
- Website: www.gu.ac.ug
- Location within Uganda

Gulu University (GU) is a multi-campus public university in Uganda. It is one of the nine public universities in the country, as of September 2016.

== Location ==
As of October 2016, GU has three campuses.

(a) The main campus is approximately 5 kilometres (3.1 mi), by road, north-east of the central business district of Gulu, the largest city in Uganda's Northern Region. This is approximately 333 kilometres (207 mi), by road, north of Kampala, Uganda's capital and largest city.

(b) The second campus is in Kitgum town, approximately 104 kilometres (65 mi), by road, north-east of Gulu, close to the international border with South Sudan. That campus became operational in 2011.

(c) Upon the request of the Kingdom of Bunyoro, the university established a campus in the city of Hoima, offering agriculture, environment, computer science, information technology, business studies, accounting and education.

== History ==
GU was established by Act 7 of 2001 of the Parliament of Uganda. That Act was subsequently amended by Act 3 of 2006. The university admitted its first students and commenced teaching activities in September 2002.

== Progress ==
On 23 January 2010, during the fifth annual graduation ceremony, GU awarded degrees to 1,050 graduates, including 40 medical doctors, the first graduating class of the Gulu University School of Medicine (with the help of the University of Naples Federico II). The graduates also included thirteen students who received a Master of Business Administration degree.

== Former association with Lira University ==
In 2009, GU established a constituent college in the city of Lira, which is about 100 kilometres (62 mi) to the southeast of Gulu. The campus, then named Lira University College, admitted its first students in August 2012 (100 of them). It continued operating in this capacity until the Ugandan Parliament (Act No. 35, July 2016) elevated it to an independent public university. Since 1 August 2016, it has been referred to as Lira University.

== Academic courses ==
=== Undergraduate programs ===
As of January 2016, the following undergraduate academic degree courses were offered at GU, according to an advertisement placed in the New Vision by the university.

==== Faculty of Agriculture and the Environment ====
- Bachelor of Agriculture
- Bachelor of Science in Biosystems Engineering
- Bachelor of Science in Agri-Entrepreneurship and Communication Management
- Bachelor of Science in Food and Agribusiness

==== Faculty of Business and Development Studies ====
- Bachelor of Business Administration
- Bachelor of Public Administration
- Bachelor of Development Studies
- Bachelor of Science in Economics
- Bachelor of Quantitative Economics

==== Faculty of Law ====
- Bachelor of Laws

==== Faculty of Education and Humanities ====
- Bachelor of Arts Education
- Bachelor of Business Education
- Bachelor of Education Primary

==== Faculty of Medicine ====
- Bachelor of Medicine and Bachelor of Surgery

==== Faculty of Science ====
- Bachelor of Science Education in Biological Sciences
- Bachelor of Science Education in Physical Sciences
- Bachelor of Science Education in Economics
- Bachelor of Science Education in Sport Science
- Bachelor of Science in Computer Science
- Bachelor of Information and Communication Technology

=== Postgraduate programs ===
The following postgraduate degree courses were offered at GU in January 2016.

==== Faculty of Medicine ====
- Master of Medicine in Surgery
- Master of Medical Anthropology

==== Faculty of Business and Development Studies ====
- Master of Business Administration
- Master of Arts in Public Administration & Management
- Master of Arts in Conflict Transformation Studies
- Master of Arts in Governance and Ethics

==== Faculty of Science ====
- Master of Science in Applied Tropical Entomology and Parasitology
- Master of Science in Agri-Enterprises Development
- Master of Science in Food Security and Community Nutrition

== Students ==
In July 2014, GU admitted 2,500 privately sponsored students and approximately 250 government-sponsored students. The total student population in 2014 was about 5,000, including diploma, undergraduate, and postgraduate programme enrollees.

== Staff ==
As of January 2013, GU employed 421 full-time staff, of whom 241 were academic staff and 180 were non-teaching staff. As of August 2013, the university had a shortage of 73 academic staff, according to Vice Chancellor Jack Nyeko Pen-Mogi.

== See also ==
- List of university leaders in Uganda
- List of universities in Uganda
- List of law schools in Uganda
- List of business schools in Uganda
- List of medical schools in Uganda
- Education in Uganda
