= Fort Portal College of Health Sciences =

Public institution in Uganda

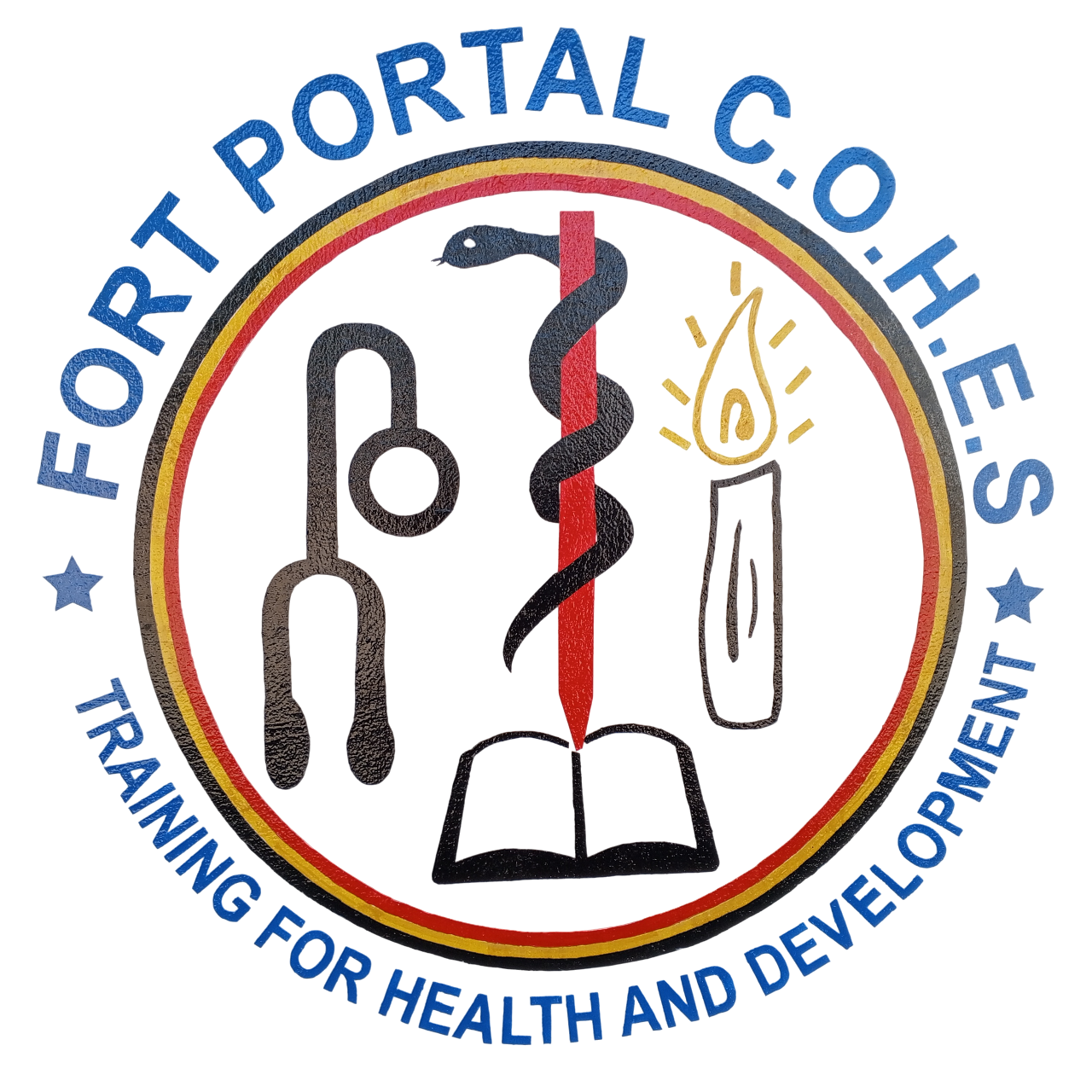
FPCOHES logo

Fort Portal College of Health Sciences (FPCOHES) is a public institution in Uganda, accredited to offer diploma-level education in health sciences as of 2022.

== Location ==
The college is located at Plot 9, Mugurusi Road, Buhinga, Fort Portal City, Kabarole District, in the Western region of Uganda, about 296 kilometers (183 miles) west of Kampala, the capital. It is situated near Buhinga Primary School and Fort Portal Hospital, also known as Fort Portal Regional Referral Hospital.

== History ==
Founded in 1965, FPCOHES began as the Fort Portal School of Medical Assistants, originally located at the King’s Palace in Fort Portal. In 1969, it relocated near Fort Portal Hospital. Following a curriculum review in 1984, it was renamed the Fort Portal School of Clinical Officers. It later transitioned into its current status as a college of health sciences.

== Academic programs ==
FPCOHES offers a range of certificate and diploma programs designed to equip students with practical and theoretical skills in health sciences:

- Certificate in Medical Records and Health Informatics
- Certificate in Pharmacy (CPH)
- Certificate in Theater Techniques (CTA)
- Diploma in Clinical Medicine and Community Health (DCM)
- Diploma in Pharmacy (DPH)
- Higher Diploma in Anaesthesia (DAN)
- Higher Diploma in Health Leadership and Management (DLM)

The institution combines academic learning with hands-on training, leveraging partnerships with healthcare providers.

== Governance and leadership ==
The college is governed by a council that includes representatives from both the healthcare and education sectors, as stipulated in the Universities and Other Tertiary Institutions Act. Its administrative team is responsible for ensuring effective policy implementation and the smooth running of daily operations.

== Alumni ==
FPCOHES maintains connections with alumni who have contributed significantly to the healthcare sector. Some of the alumni include:

- Richard Byaruhanga Sserioza - Lecturer
- Dr. Ponsiano Kabagyenga Nuwagaba - Lecturer
- Dr. Iddi Matovu - Public Health Consultant

== See also ==
- Recognized institutions by NCHE
- Accredited schools – allied health training
- Ministry of Education and Sports
- Ministry of Health
