= Universal Technology and Management University =

Private university in Uganda

Universal Technology and Management University (UTAMU)
- Motto: For an Open Mind
- Type: Private
- Established: 2012; 14 years ago
- Chancellor: Patrick Bitature
- Vice-Chancellor: Anny Katabaazi Bwengye
- Administrative staff: 50+ (2013)
- Students: 1,800+ (2018)
- Location: 6 Erisa Road, Kiswa; Bugolobi, Kampala, Uganda; 00°19′19″N 32°37′17″E
- Campus: Urban
- Website: www.utamu.ac.ug
- Location within Kampala

The Universal Technology and Management University (UTAMU), previously Uganda Technology and Management University, is a private university in Uganda founded in 2012 and licensed by the Uganda National Council for Higher Education (UNCHE).

== Location ==
The university campus is located at Plot 6, Erisa Road, Kiswa, Bugolobi, in Nakawa Division, one of the five administrative divisions of Kampala, the capital and largest city of Uganda. This is about 5 kilometres (3 mi), by road, east of the central business district of the city. The coordinates of the university campus are: 0°19'19.0"N 32°37'17.0"E (Latitude:0.321944; Longitude:32.621389).

== History ==
UTAMU was founded in 2012 by a group of academics in Uganda and currently with a shareholding of 27 members. It was offered a licence to run degree programmes in March 2013 by the National Council for Higher Education (NCHE) the governmental body that licenses institutions of higher learning in the country. UTAMU started initially with five undergraduate degree courses in business and information technology.

== Academic structure ==
As of July 2014, the university operated in the following schools:

1. School of Computing and Engineering
2. School of Business and Management
3. School of Professional and Vocational Education and
4. School of Graduate Studies.

== Academics ==
In its second year of operation, the university expanded its undergraduate degree menu from the original five courses to about two dozen courses in business and information technology.

Academic diplomas are offered to undergraduate and graduate students in a number of disciplines. Certificates are offered to undergraduate and graduate students in a number of disciplines. The university offers the degrees of Master of Science, Masters of Arts, and Doctor of Philosophy in many disciplines in all four schools.

== Notable alumni ==
- Ruth Doreen Mutebe: Ugandan accountant, businesswoman, and corporate executive, who serves as the Head of Internal Audit at Umeme Limited. Obtained a Master of Science in Computing from UTAMU.

== See also ==
- Education in Uganda
- List of business schools in Uganda
- List of universities in Uganda
