= Busoga University =

University in Uganda

Busoga University (BU)
- Motto: "Center of Academic Excellence"
- Type: Private
- Established: 1999
- Chancellor: Bishop Dr. Michael Kyomya
- Vice-Chancellor: Prof. David Lameck Kibikyo
- Administrative staff: 370 (2013)
- Students: 5,000+ (2014)
- Location: Iganga, Uganda; 00°35′42″N 33°27′43″E
- Campus: Urban
- Website: Homepage
- Location in Uganda

Busoga University (BU), is a private university in Uganda, affiliated with Central Busoga Diocese of the Church of Uganda.

== Location ==
The main campus of Busoga University is located in the town of Iganga, approximately 41 kilometres (25 mi), by road, northeast of the city of Jinja, on the highway between Jinja and Tororo. The coordinates of Busoga University Campus are:0°35'29.0"N, 33°27'32.0"E (Latitude:0.591389; Longitude:33.458889).

== Other campuses ==
As of January 2015, in addition to the Main Campus, Busoga University maintains several other campuses, including the following:

1. Jinja Campus - Jinja
2. Kamuli Campus - Buwaiswa, Kamuli District
3. Downtown Campus - Downtown Iganga
4. Bugiri Campus - Bugiri
5. Kaliro Campus - Kaliro
6. Pallisa Campus -Pallisa
7. Bugembe Campus - Bugembe - “Bishop Hannington School of Divinity and Theology (BHSDT)’’, a constituent School of Busoga University.

== History ==
Busoga University was founded in 1999, following the issuance of a tertiary institutional license by the Ministry of Education and Sports. The university is a non-profit organization.

On 23 February 1993, Busoga College Mwiri’s Board of Governors passed a resolution to establish a university on the same hill and requested Busoga Diocesan Council and the House of Bishops to become the foundation body of the anticipated university. On 19 November 1994, a University Formation Task Force (UFTF) was appointed "to map out the process of establishing BU" and on 21 April 1995, it presented its report to the Bishop. On 6 May 1995, the Bishop inaugurated BU in the presence of His Royal Highness the Kyabazinga of Busoga, Henry Wako Muloki. Soon after, Busoga Diocese surrendered its Iganga land and buildings of Bishop Hannington Theological College to BU, and on 30 July, BU received its interim license. On 12 February 1999, BU opened its gates to students.

In 2017, its provisional license was revoked by the Uganda National Council for Higher Education, but it was given permission to reapply after two years.

== Affiliations ==
Busoga University has academic linkages with the University of Wisconsin Oshkosh, in Oshkosh, Wisconsin, United States and the University College Northampton, in Northampton, UK.

== Academics ==
The university offers certificate, diploma, undergraduate and post-graduate courses in the following disciplines:

- Philosophy
- Agribusiness
- Business Management
- Education Management
- Resource Management in Education
- Human Resource Management
- Agriculture
- Community Policing
- Development Studies
- Guidance & Counseling
- Information Technology
- Law
- Mass Communication
- Social Work & Social Administration
- Divinity & Theology
- Environmental Management
- Science Education
- Nursery Education
- Economics
- Public Administration
- Accounting
- Project Planning & Management

== See also ==
- Education in Uganda
- List of universities in Uganda
