= Ebony College Luwero =

Secondary school in Uganda

Ebony College Luweero
- Motto: Wisdom is the key
- Type: Private
- Established: 2002 - founded 2003 – Opening of day school 2005 – Opening of boarding school
- Location: Luweero, Luweero District, Central Region, Uganda, Uganda
- Colours: Green; Yellow

Ebony College, Luweero is a day and boarding secondary school in the district of Luweero in Uganda. The school was founded in 2002 by Edward Makumbi and Olivia Makumbi, and was officially opened in 2003.

== Location ==
The school is based in Luweero within Luweero District, 74 km (47 min) by road north of the capital city Kampala.

== History ==
Construction began in January 2002 and by December 2002, eight structures (blocks) were up, six classrooms, an administration block and a staff room.

Ebony College officially opened in January 2003 with fifteen students, four staff members, and continued to grow. By the end of 2009, the school had five hundred and forty students, with a teaching staff of over twenty eight teachers.

== Description ==
Ebony College offers O level and A level education, and is currently run by headteacher Cylus Waggwa, a former head teacher of King David High School of Wakiso district. The school organizes annual events, functions and concerts, and places a strong emphasis on Christian education.

== Academia ==
=== Subjects taught ===
- Agriculture
- Art & design
- Biology
- Chemistry
- Commerce studies (O level)
- Christian religious studies
- English language
- English literature
- Entrepreneurship (A level)
- Geography
- History
- Information communication technology
- Islamic religious studies
- Luganda language
- Mathematics
- Physics

=== Universal Secondary education ===
In 2010 the school officially partnered up with the governments nationwide Universal Secondary Education (USE) policy, a development goal implemented to increase educational opportunities for students throughout the country.

== Student life ==
=== Sport ===
The school runs football and netball teams, which compete in post primary games. The school also runs over 10 clubs.

=== Student housing ===
All boarding students are guaranteed accommodation in the gender-segregated student dormitories, and have access to the 25-acre land which the school sits on.
