= Muteesa I Royal University =

Private university in Uganda

Muteesa I Royal University (MRU)
- Motto: Seeking Greater Horizons in Thought and Action
- Type: Private
- Established: 2007
- Chancellor: Julia Sebutinde
- Vice-Chancellor: Vincent Kakembo
- Administrative staff: 192 (2016)
- Students: ~ 3100 (2016)
- Location: Masaka, Uganda; 00°19′21″S 31°44′33″E
- Campus: Urban
- Website: Homepage
- Location in Uganda

Muteesa I Royal University (MRU)] is a private university in Uganda. It was accredited by the Uganda National Council for Higher Education in 2007 and chartered in March 2024. In 2016, Justice Julia Sebutinde was installed as Chancellor of the University, replacing Ronald Muwenda Mutebi II, the founding chancellor who became Visitor of the university.

== Location ==
MRU has three campuses.

The main campus is in the city of Masaka, approximately 135 kilometres (84 mi) southwest of Kampala, Uganda's capital and largest city. The second campus is on Mengo Hill, the seat of the Buganda Government, within the city of Kampala. The third campus is in the town of Mubende, approximately 153 kilometres (95 mi), by road, west of Kampala.

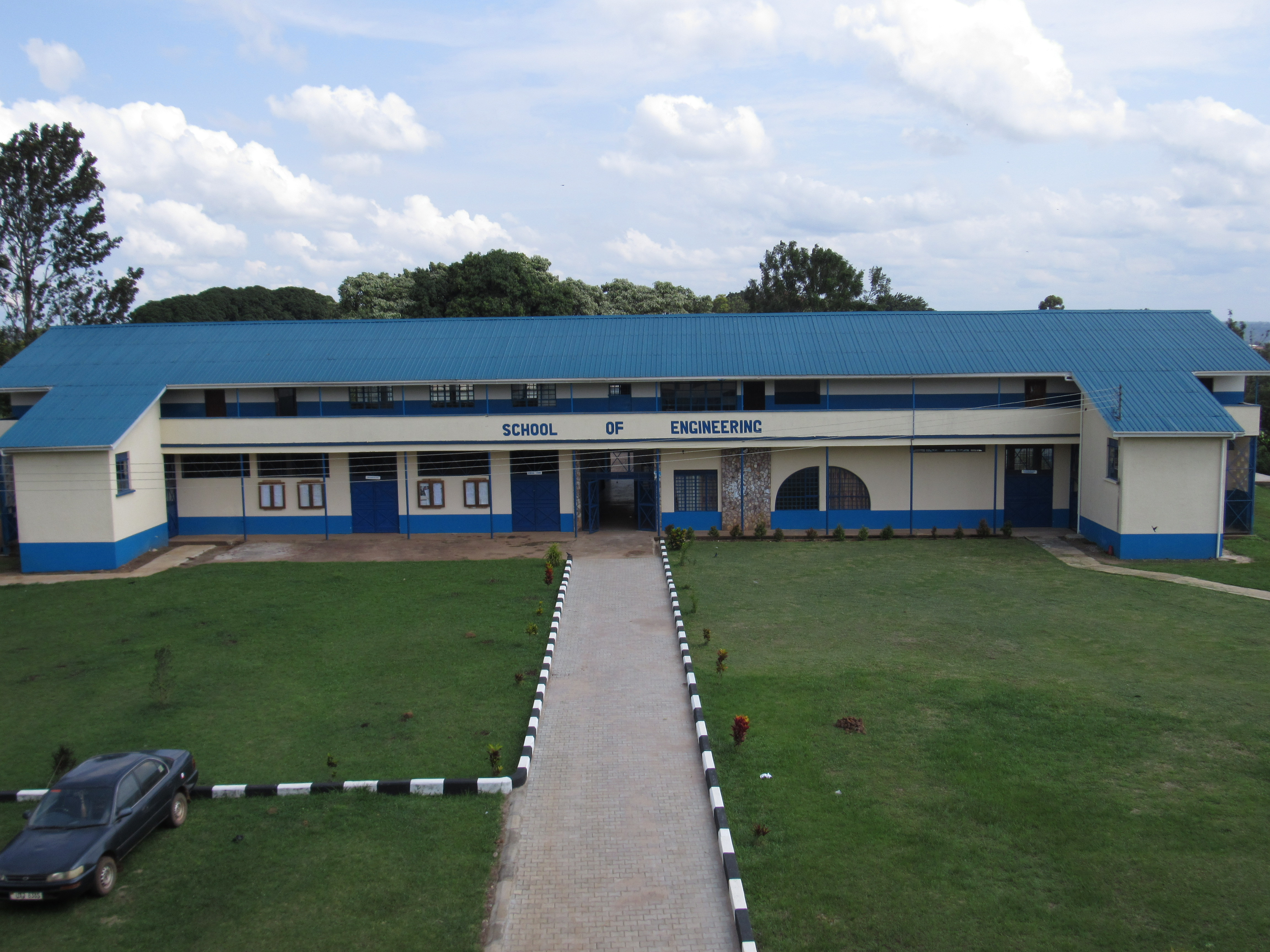
Civil, Electrical and Mechanical Engineering housed under one roof.

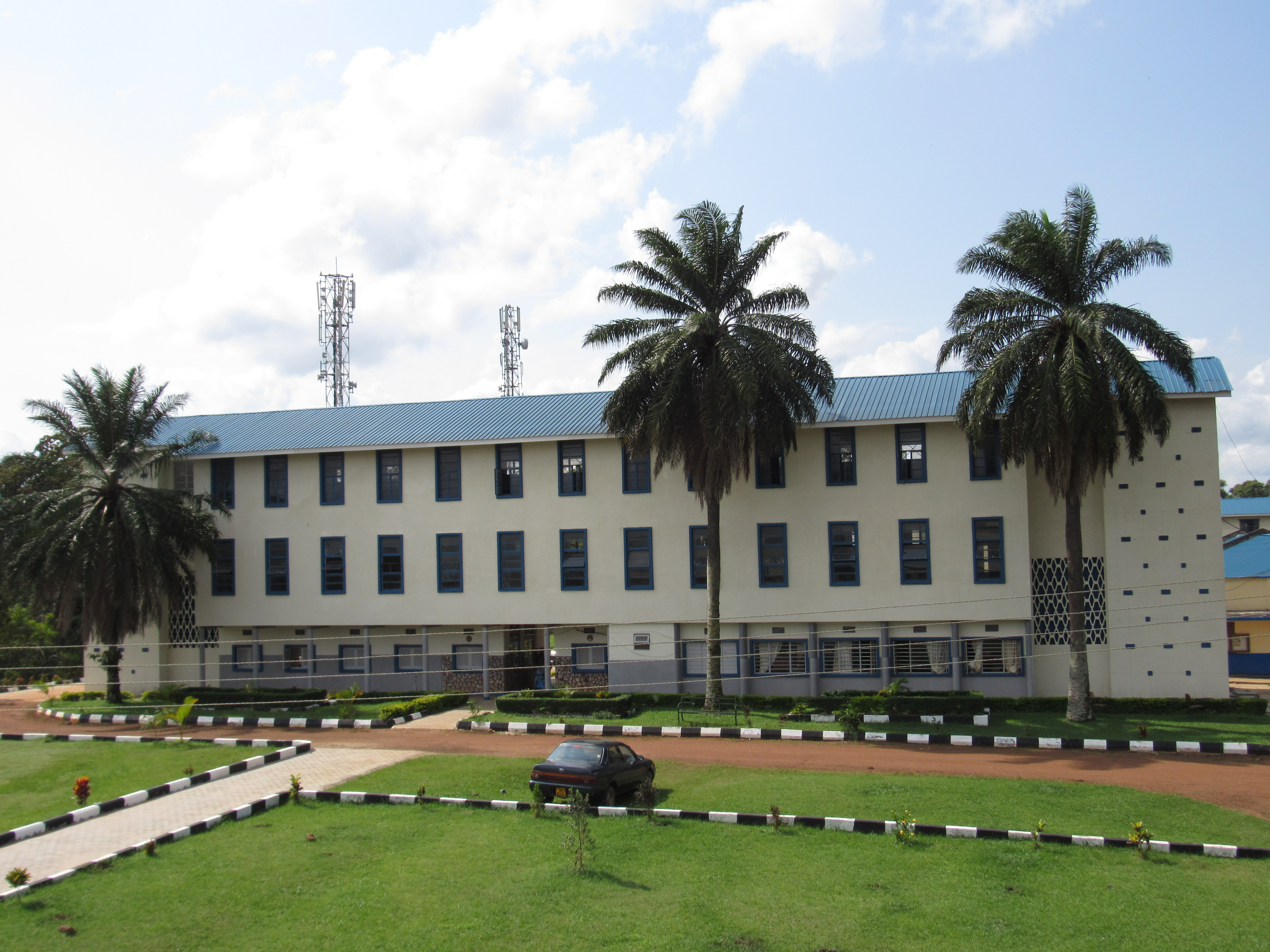
The Administration Block viewed from the Engineering facility.

== History ==
MRU was established when ownership of the Masaka Technical Institute (also known as the Uganda Technical College, Masaka), was transferred from the government of Uganda to the Buganda government in January 2007.

MRU is named after Muteesa I of Buganda, a former Kabaka of Buganda (Also known as Ssekabaka Muteesa 1) in the late 19th century (1856-1884). Ssekabaka Muteesa 1 was the Buganda Monarch who wrote a letter to Queen Victoria of England inviting Christian Ministries to bring formal education in Uganda which later spread to the rest of Uganda and East Africa. Muteesa 1 Royal University anthem also applauds Ssekabaka Muteesa 1 in a phrase " Hail Ssekabaka Muteesa the First who had such a vision for a Greater Buganda" MRU received Tertiary Education Institution accreditation from the Ministry of Education & Sports in July 2007. MRU admitted its first class of students in October 2007. MRU held its first graduation ceremony on Friday 15 April 2011. At the same ceremony, Kabaka Ronald Muwenda Mutebi II was installed as the first chancellor of the university.

== Academics ==
As of July 2018, MRU comprises the following academic faculties:

- Faculty of Science and Technology
- Faculty of Social, Cultural and Development Studies
- Faculty of Business Management
- Faculty of Education

Three other faculties are planned:

- Faculty of Agriculture and Veterinary Studies
- Faculty of Natural Environment, Tourism and Tourism Studies
- Faculty of Medicine, Health Sciences and Health Services

== See also ==
- List of universities in Uganda
- List of medical schools in Uganda
- List of university leaders in Uganda)
- Education in Uganda
