= Rainbow International School =

Rainbow International School Uganda

Location
- Kintu Road, Tyaba Zone, Kampala, Uganda 118 Luthuli Ave, Bugolobi Kampala, Uganda; 0.28349°N 32.60053°E

Information
- School type: International School. Early Years, Primary and Secondary.
- Motto: Dream. Believe. Achieve.
- Founder: Darshna Kotecha
- Head of school: Derek Jones
- Secondary head: Kimberly Barber
- Primary Head: Richard Mottram
- Age range: 2-20
- Language: English
- Hours in school day: 7:45 - 3:00/4:10
- Colour
- Sports: Football, Basketball, Volleyball, Swimming, Rugby, Tennis, Netball,
- Affiliation: COBIS, University of Cambridge, Edexcel, International Primary Curriculum, Pearson
- Website: risu.sc.ug

Rainbow International School Uganda is an international school for early-childhood, primary, and secondary education in Kampala, Uganda.

== History ==
Rainbow was established in September 1991 as a primary school with 29 children. In September 1995, the school moved to its present 9-acre (36,000 m^{2}) site with newly constructed purpose-built classrooms, an administration block and playing fields. In 2014, Rainbow undertook a 2-year internal project to earn full accreditation from the Council of British International Schools (COBIS).

== Curriculum ==
Rainbow follows the National Curriculum for England, with an emphasis on a thorough understanding in its core subjects (mathematics, science, English and ICT). Students also study humanities, the arts, and physical education. In primary school (Year 1-Year 6), the International Primary Curriculum is taught as part of the National Curriculum. In Years 7, 8 & 9, the National Curriculum is still taught, and in Years 10 & 11, students study an IGCSE programme. In Sixth Form (Years 12 & 13), students have an option to take A-level programmes, BTEC programmes, or both. Rainbow introduced the BTEC curriculum into the school in August of 2016.

== Duke of Edinburgh Award ==
Rainbow commenced its participation in the Duke of Edinburgh Award in September 2014, which was founded by Mr. Skulmosky. The award was discontinued at Rainbow temporarily, but reinstated on 27 August 2017. It was discontinued once again, but in late 2025 the award was brought back once again.
