= Kampala International University =

Private university in Uganda

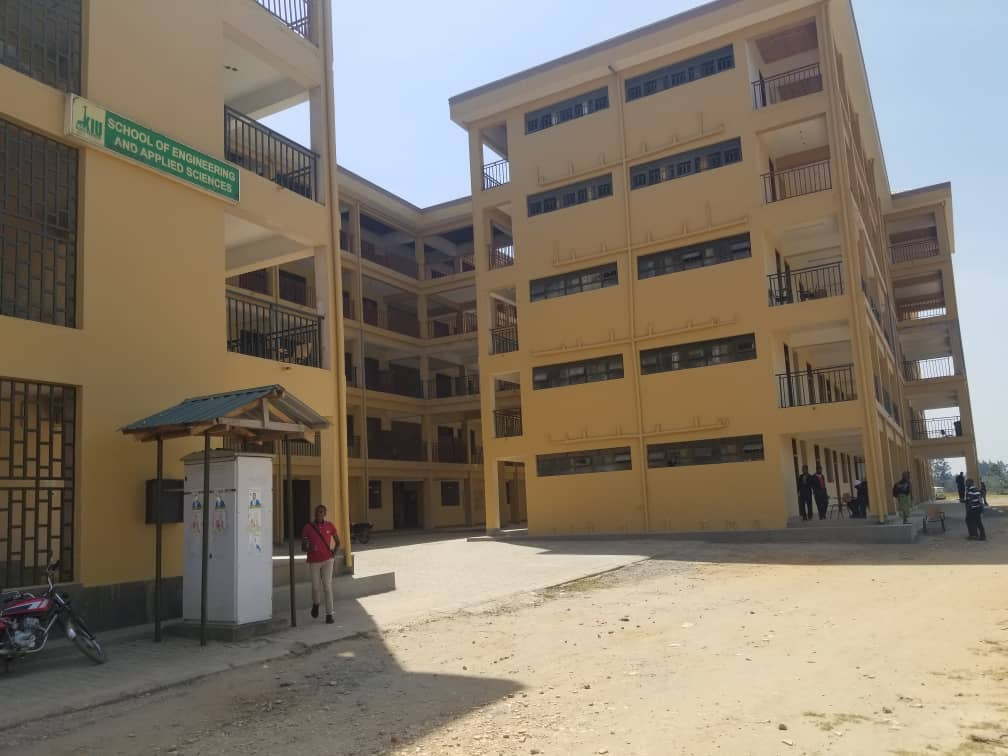
- School of Engineering and Applied Science
- Motto: Exploring the Heights
- Type: Private
- Established: 2001; 25 years ago
- Chancellor: Yunus Mgaya
- Vice-Chancellor: Muhammed Ngoma
- Administrative staff: ~300
- Students: 12,000+
- Location: Kampala, Uganda; 00°17′41″N 32°36′13″E
- Campus: Main Campus, Kansanga Western Campus, Ishaka
- Website: Kampala International University
- Location within Kampala

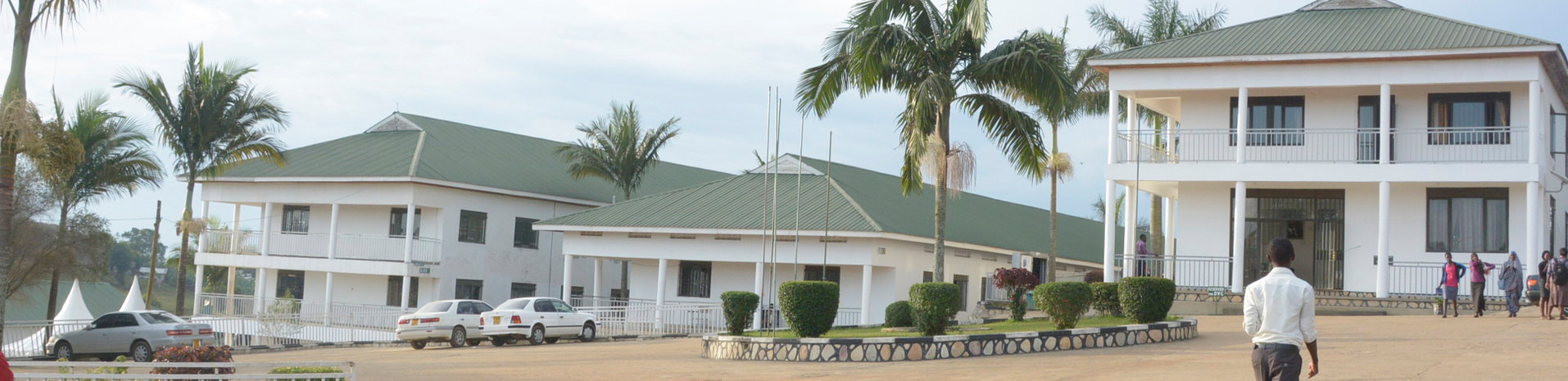
Kampala International University

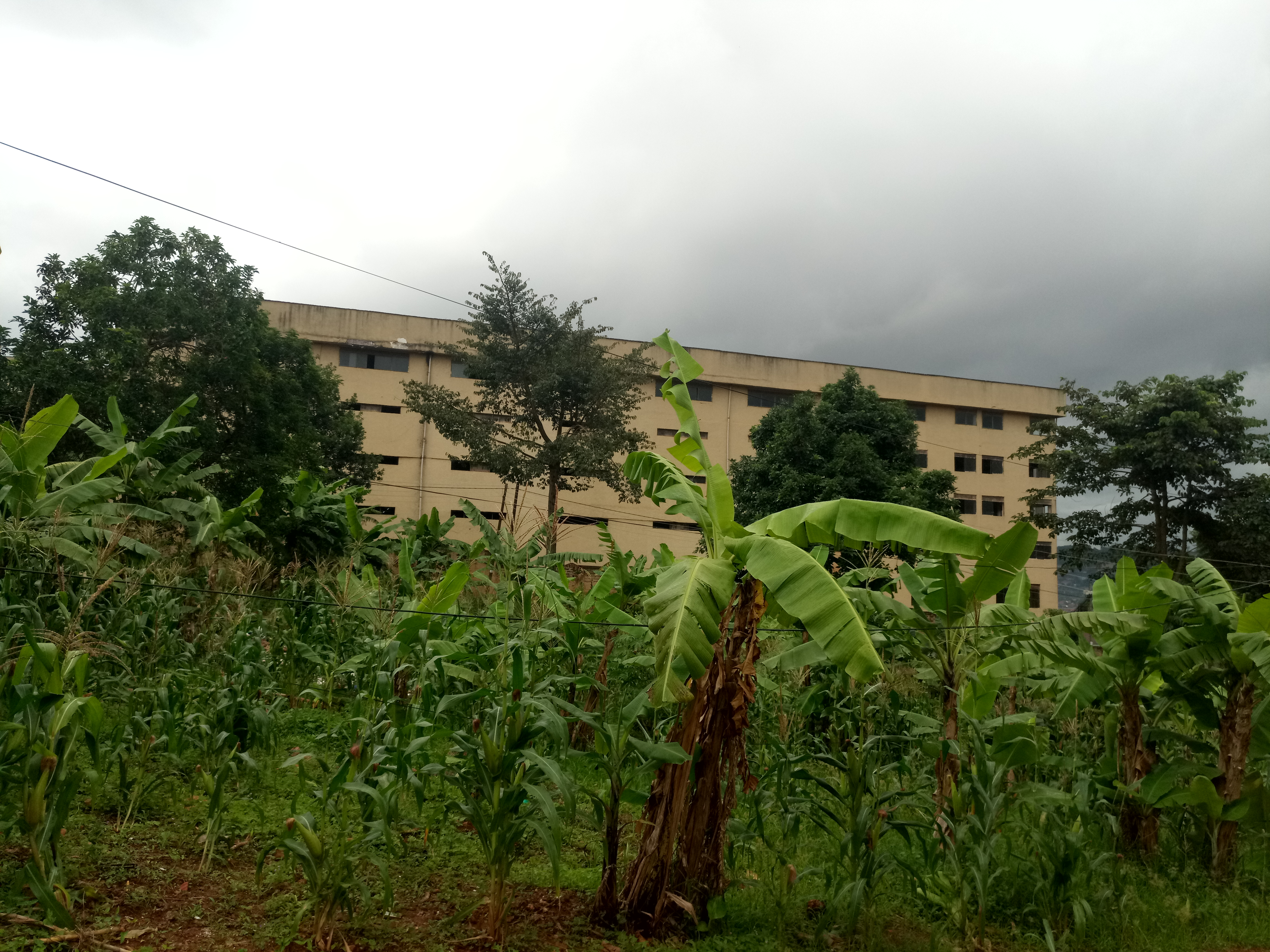
Behind Kampala International University

Kampala International University (KIU) is a private, not-for-profit institution based in Uganda. It was established in 2001 and assumed chartered status in 2009.

In pursuit of the dream to raise the next generation of problem solvers for the East African region and indeed the whole of Africa, the University operates a multi-campus system which consists of two campuses in Uganda (the main campus in Kampala and the western campus in Ishaka-Bushenyi); one other university in Dar es Salaam, Tanzania, while a third one is being developed in Nairobi, Kenya. The University, which started as a typical degree-awarding institution, has now grown into the number one private university in Uganda and is currently ranked number 2 in the country according to the 2022 Webometric Ranking, out of 68 universities. It is a member of the Association of Commonwealth Universities, the Association of Africa Universities as well as the Inter University-Council of East Africa. The University offers a variety of programmes in Health Sciences, Science and Technology, Engineering, Business and Management, Law, Humanities and Education.

== Location ==
KIU has its main campus at Kansanga, in Makindye Division in the south-eastern part of Kampala, Uganda's capital and largest city. The campus is approximately 7 kilometres (4.3 mi) south-east of Kampala's central business district, along the road to Ggaba. The coordinates of the campus are 0°17'41.0"N, 32°36'13.0"E (Latitude:0.294722; Longitude:32.603611).

Kampala International University Western Campus is located in Ishaka in Bushenyi District, about 328 kilometres (204 mi), by road, south-west of Kampala.

KIU maintains a third campus, the KIU Dar es Salaam Constituent College, in Dar es Salaam, Tanzania.

== History ==
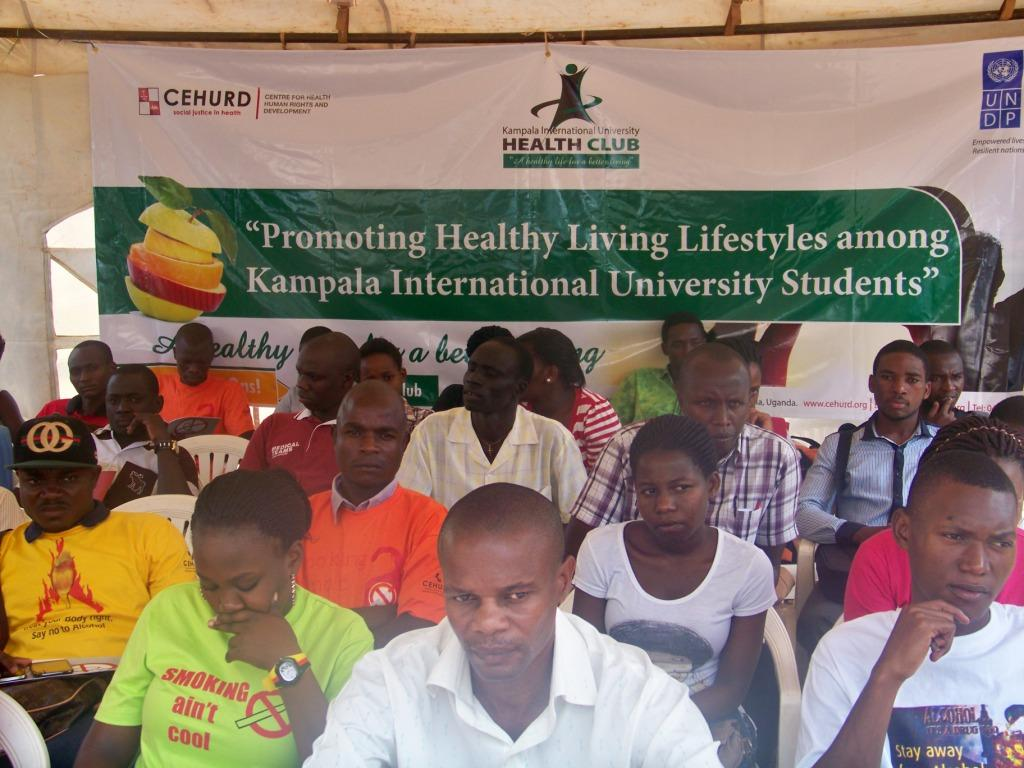
Kampala international university Students

Kampala International University (KIU) is a private, not-for-profit institution based in Uganda. It was established in 2001 and received its university charter in March 2009.

== University Management ==
=== Executive ===
The University Executive consists of

- The Vice-Chancellor, Professor Mouhammed Ngoma
- Deputy Vice-Chancellor, Academic Affairs, Dr Jacob Eneji Ashibi
- Deputy Vice-Chancellor, Finance and Administration, Dr Mundu Mustafa
- Deputy Vice-Chancellor, Research Innovations Consultancy and Extensions, Professor Regina Idu Ejemot-Nwadiaro
- Deputy Vice-Chancellor, Western Campus, Associate Professor Eric Mabonga
- Assistant Deputy Vice-Chancellor, Academic and Research, Western Campus, Dr Ibrahim Babangida Abubakar
- University Secretary, Ms Asiati Mbabazi
- Campus Administrator, Ms Christine Ainebyoona

== Academic colleges, schools, and institutes ==
=== Main campus ===
KIU's main campus has three constituent colleges, three schools, and one directorate

1. KIU College of Education
2. College of Humanities
3. College of Economics and Management
4. School of Law
5. School of Computing and Information Technology
6. School of Humanities
7. Directorate of Higher Degrees and Research

This is the largest of the three campuses, hosting more than 7,000 students and over 300 academic staff.

=== Western campus ===
The Western Campus in Ishaka has 4 schools and 1 faculty

1. School of Engineering and Applied Sciences
2. School of Allied Health Sciences
3. School of Biomedical Sciences
4. School of Nursing Sciences
5. Faculty of Clinical Medicine and Dentistry

This campus houses over 5,000 students supervised by over 200 academic staff.

Certificate, diploma, undergraduate, and postgraduate programs are offered at this campus. It is predominantly a science-based institution.

The School of Health Sciences is located on the western campus. The school is one of Uganda's seven medical schools, and it was the first privately owned medical school in the country. The school offers programmes in medicine, dentistry, nursing, medical laboratory technology, education, business, and management and information technology. The school has a teaching hospital with a bed capacity of 1,200.

=== Dar es Salaam campus ===
This campus is housed on 100 acres (40 ha) in the Gongolamboto area in Ilala District, along Pugu Road. The campus is approximately 7 kilometres (4.3 mi) from Julius Nyerere International Airport.

== 2013 government investigation ==
In 2013, the Ugandan National Council for Higher Education (NCHE) began an investigation into whether the 42 Doctorates of Philosophy (PhDs) awarded by KIU up to that time had met NCHE's requirements. At the end of the investigation in November 2013, NCHE declared that the PhDs were legitimate.

== See also ==
- Education in Uganda
- List of universities in Uganda
- List of university leaders in Uganda
- List of medical schools in Uganda
- List of business schools in Uganda
