= Kabale University =

Public university in Uganda

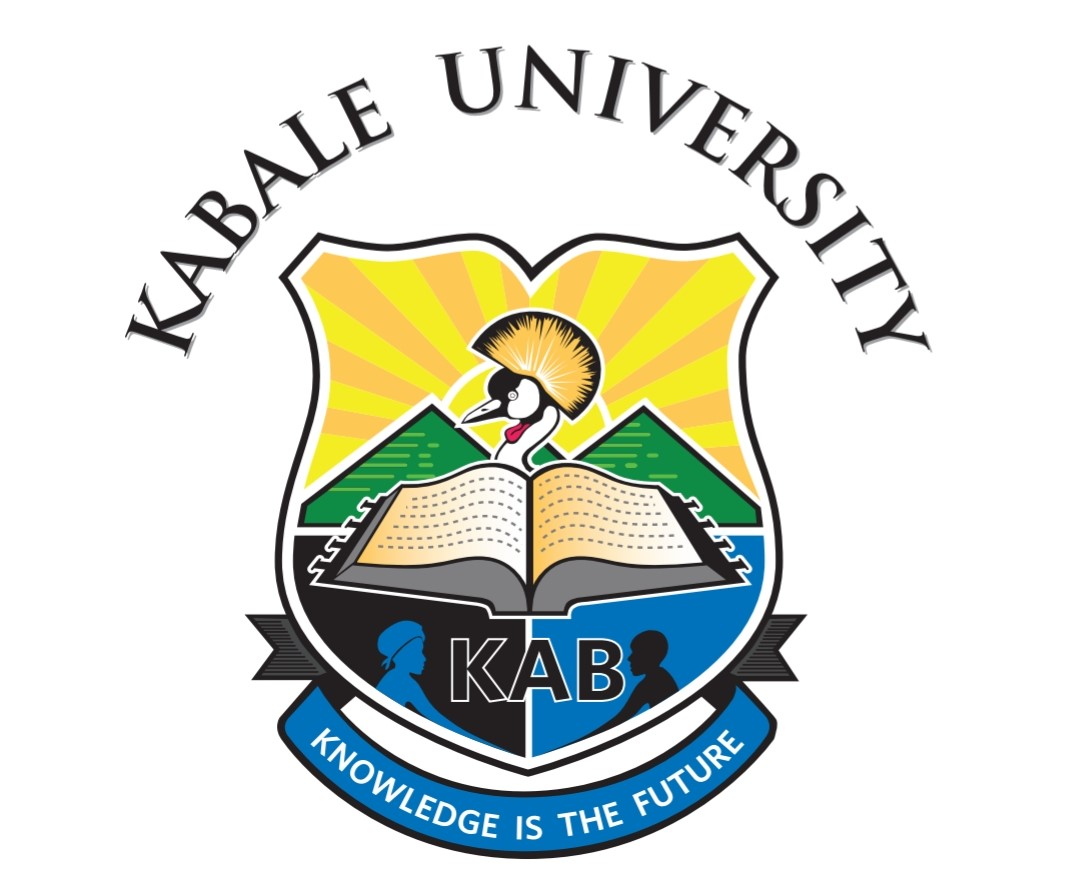
- Motto: Knowledge is the Future
- Type: Public
- Established: 2001; 25 years ago
- Accreditation: National Council for Higher Education
- Chancellor: Mondo Kagonyera
- Vice-Chancellor: Joy Kwesiga
- Administrative staff: 400+ (2022)
- Students: 6,661 (2024)
- Location: Plot 364 Block 3 Kikungiri Hill, Kabale Municipality Kabale – Kigali Highway, Kabale, Uganda, Kabale, Uganda; 01°16′20″S 29°59′18″E
- Campus: Urban
- Website: Homepage
- Location in Uganda

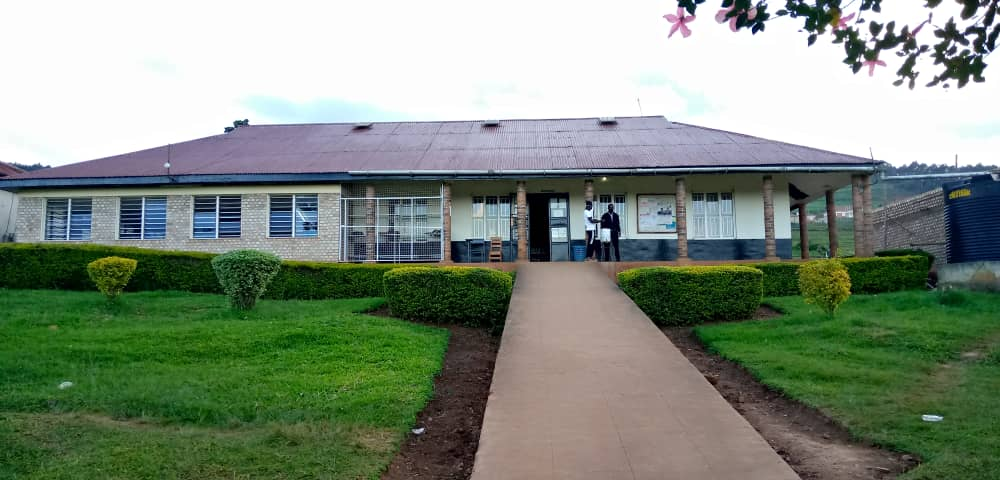
Mukombe Library, the first and oldest Library of Kabale University

Kabale University (KAB) is a public university in Kabale Municipality, Uganda.

== Location ==
The main campus of KAB is located on Kikungiri Hill, in Kabale Municipality, on 52 hectares (130 acres) of land donated by the Kabale District Administration. This location is 1 kilometre (0.62 mi) off the Kabale-Katuna/Gatuna Road, approximately 409 kilometres (254 mi), by road, southwest of Kampala, Uganda's capital and largest city. The coordinates of KAB are 1°16'20.0"S, 29°59'18.0"E (Latitude:-1.272215; Longitude:29.988321).

== History ==
KAB was established as a private institution in 2002 by stakeholders in the Kigezi sub-region. The major objective of KAB is to contribute to the socioeconomic development of Kigezi, Uganda, East Africa, Eastern Africa, and Africa through accessible training, research, and decentralised service delivery, using participatory and inclusive approaches and methodologies. KAB received accreditation from the Uganda National Council for Higher Education in 2005.

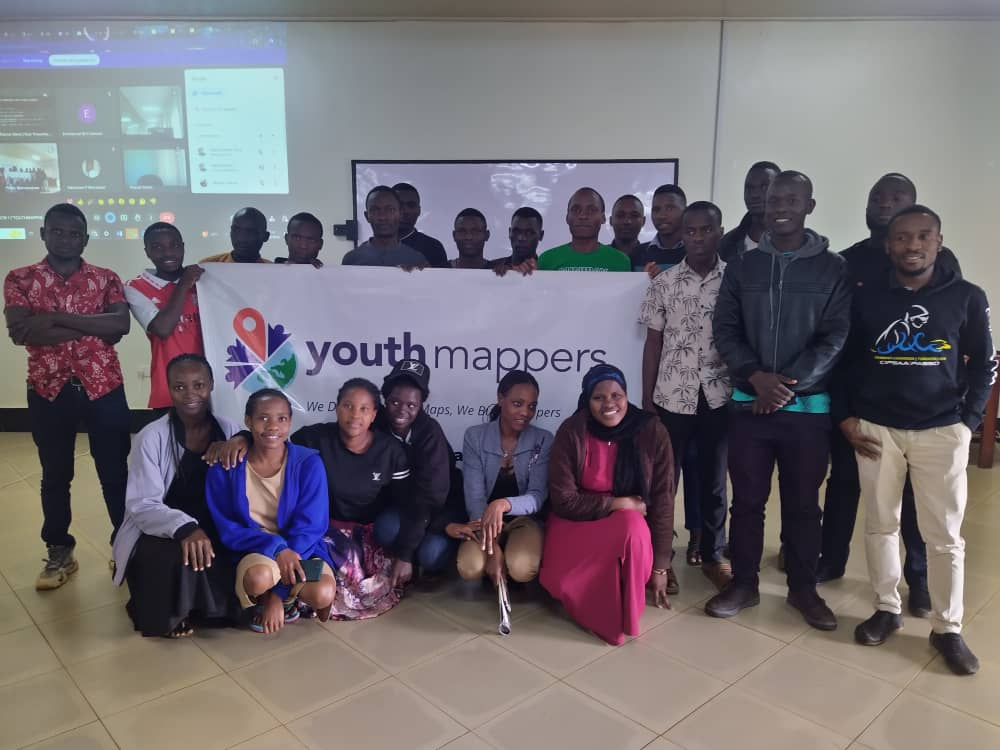
A group photo of kabale University YouthMappers club students after day 2 of the Participatory GIS series.

As of 2015, Kabale University became a Public University, fully owned and governed by the Government of the Republic of Uganda, the government of Uganda took over the private university, making it the first private University to be converted to public in the history of Uganda.

== Academics ==
The university is organised into the following academic units:

- School of Medicine
- Faculty of Arts and Social Sciences
- Faculty of Computing, Library and Information Science
- Faculty of Engineering, Technology, Applied Design and Fine Art
- Faculty of Education
- Faculty of Science
- Faculty of Economics and Management Sciences
- Faculty of Agriculture and environmental Sciences
- Institute of Languages
- Institute of Tourism and Hospitality
- Faculty of Law

== See also ==
- Education in Uganda
- List of universities in Uganda
- List of university leaders in Uganda
- List of Business Schools in Uganda
