= Education in Uganda =

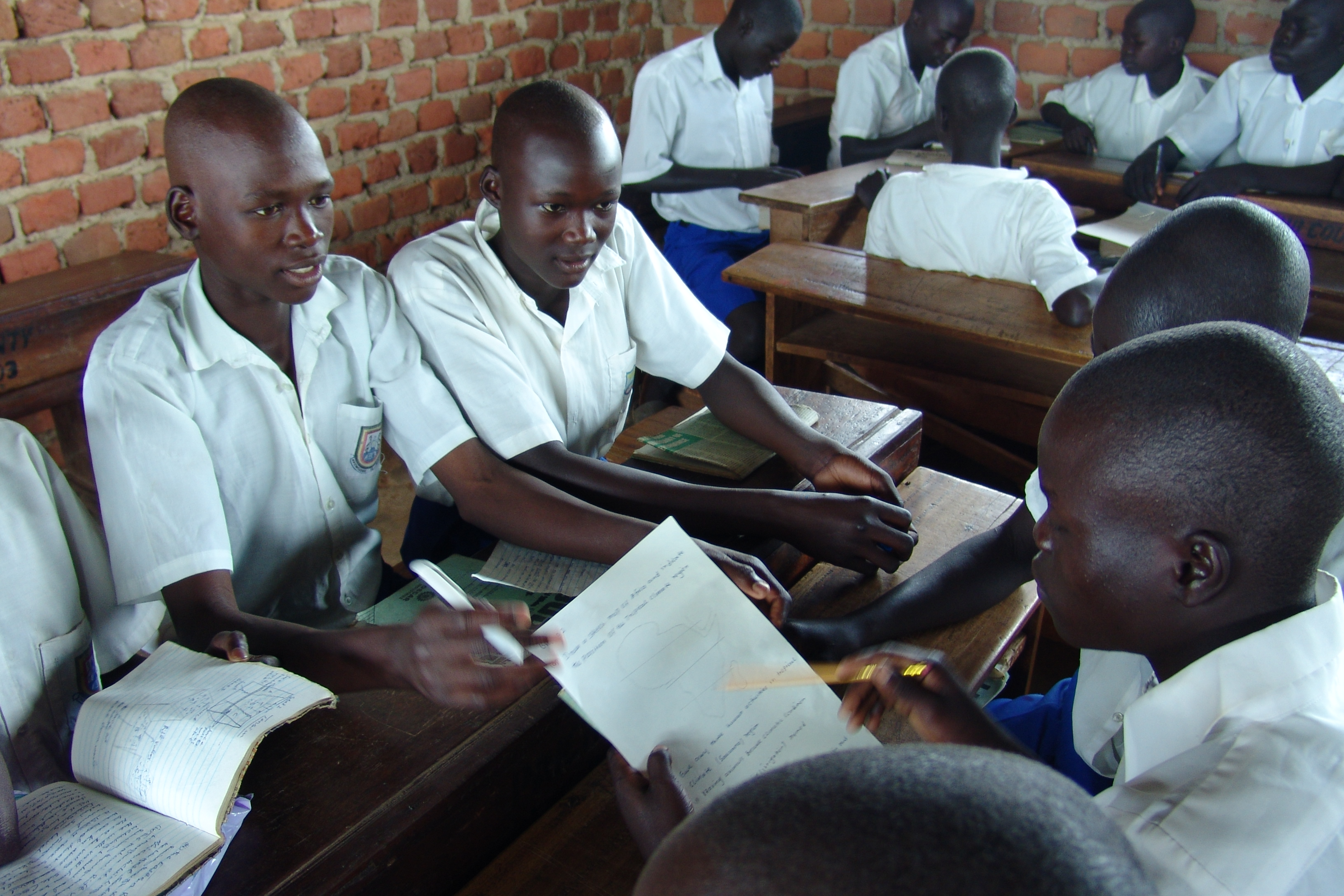
Students in Uganda.

The system of education in Uganda has a structure of 7 years of primary education, 6 years of secondary education (divided into 4 years of lower secondary and 2 years of upper secondary school), and 3 to 5 years of post-secondary education. Education in Uganda is administered in English. All throughout the levels in the education structure, modules are taught and assessed in English. The government of Uganda recognizes education as a basic human right and continues to strive to provide free primary education to all children in the country. However, issues with funding, teacher training, rural populations, and inadequate facilities continue to hinder the progress of educational development in Uganda. More girls in Uganda complete primary school than boys (54% for girls versus 52% for boys), but the lead falls away for secondary school (25% for girls versus 28% for boys) and then at tertiary level there are significantly fewer women being educated than men (4% for women versus 6% for men).

== Primary education ==
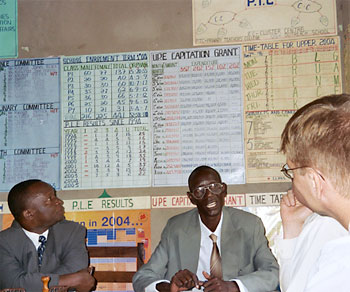
The headmaster of Nsaasa Primary School answers a question for a USAID worker.

The present system of education, known as Universal Primary Education (UPE), has existed since 1997, and its introduction was the result of democratization and open elections, as there was popular support for free education. Despite its promising boosts in enrolment, issues with funding and organization have continued to plague the UPE. In 1999 there were six million pupils receiving primary education, compared to only two million in 1986. Numbers received a boost in 1997 when free primary education was made available to four children per family. Not all primary school graduates go on to take any form of secondary education. This is contingent upon their passing their Primary Leaving Examinations (PLE).

Uganda is one of East Africa's developing countries, bordered by Tanzania, Rwanda, the Democratic Republic of the Congo, South Sudan, and Kenya. It occupies 236,040 square kilometres (91,140 mi^{2}) and has 26,404,543 people. According to CIA World Fact Book 2004, more than 80 percent of its population is rural and 35% of the people lives below poverty line. The United Nations characterized the current condition of Uganda with its unstable government and struggling people as "the world’s worst humanitarian crisis."

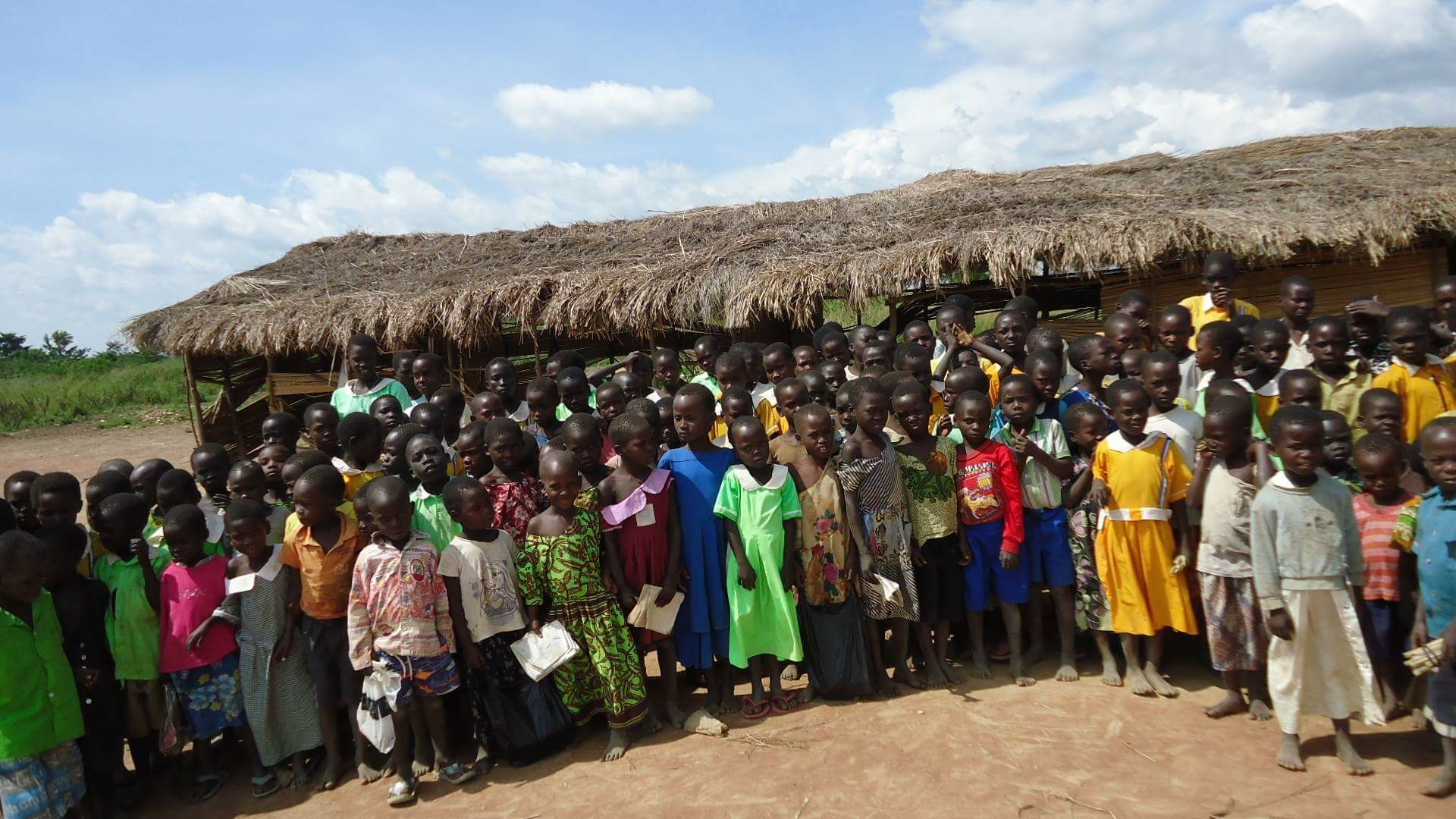
Community school at Kolir (Bukedea District)

In 1997 the Ugandan government introduced the Universal Primary Education (UPE) program to improve enrollment and attainment in primary schools. It was initially realized to provide free education for four children per family, but the program was not performing based in its regulations due to the complex structure of Ugandan families. Most Ugandan families have more than four children and households started sending every child, which resulted in a rapid increase in student enrollment in primary schools. Due to the circumstances, President Museveni announced that the UPE was open to all children of all families (Omona 74). When the new policy was executed, schools experienced a massive influx of pupils and the demand for learning materials, teachers, and infrastructure became a challenge to the education system. Ngaka argues that the UPE resulted in costly consequences, including but not limited to a poor quality education, low pupil achievement, untrained teachers, improper infrastructures and classroom settings. The Human Rights Measurement Initiative gives Uganda a score of 92.3% for primary school enrolment.

Uganda has seven years of primary education and the legal age for school entry is six. According to the Ministry of Education and Sports (MoES) statistics, school enrollments increased from three million to 5.3 million in 1997 and the number rapidly increased to seven million by 2004. Even though the increased number of pupils was perceived as a good thing, there were only 125,883 teachers, exceeding the UPE required pupil-teacher ratio of 1:40. The large number of pupils makes the learning environment poorer as it becomes harder for the teacher to be heard and teach. According to Arbeiter and Hartley, classes have between 70 and 150 pupils and there is over-age studying in all schools. Moyi explains the issue of many classes having the inappropriate age of pupils as having been driven by late enrolment or grade repetition, which in turn is caused by the poor quality of education. For instance, “third grade included pupils aged between seven to sixteen years and in sixth grade there were pupils up to nineteen years of age."

=== Disability Education ===
Uganda has established several policies and laws that support the inclusion and education of people with disabilities. In 1994, Uganda signed the Convention on the Rights of Persons with Disabilities under UNESCO, committing to inclusive education for students with disabilities. Inclusion is a central idea in Uganda's reform agenda, as outlined in the National Vision 2040. For children, inclusion means full participation in education regardless of physical, intellectual, social, emotional, linguistic, or other needs. However, progress toward fully inclusive education by 2040 remains uncertain. The People with Disabilities Act of 2006 and the United Nations Convention on the Rights of Persons with Disabilities (UNCRPD) 2008, particularly Article 24, guarantee equal rights to education for children with disabilities. The Uganda Equal Opportunities Commission (EOC) Act of 2007 was also enacted to ensure compliance with equality requirements. About 15 percent of Ugandans have a disability, leading the government to prioritize disability issues across all sectors. In 2015, the National Disability Inclusive Planning Guidelines were introduced to coordinate inclusion efforts for people with disabilities. However, despite clear policies, significant implementation challenges persist.

The Universal Primary Education (UPE) policy, introduced in 1997, expanded access to primary education for children in Uganda. Inclusion is defined as "to enable everyone to learn and grow, and work together in regular schools, irrespective of their backgrounds.” Although UPE aimed to include students with disabilities, its impact has been limited. Disparities in educational access persist between children with and without disabilities. Even after policy revisions, opportunities for children with disabilities remain inconsistent, especially among low-income families. While UPE provides free education, families must still cover costs such as uniforms, meals, and transportation. The policy does not fund accommodations for students with disabilities, such as accessible infrastructure, transportation, alternative-format textbooks, or assistive devices. As a result, parents often prioritize schooling for children without disabilities when resources are limited, leading to the exclusion of children with disabilities from education. “Recent reports suggest that while enrollment numbers have increased under UPE, children with special needs in the central region experience higher dropout rates and poorer academic outcomes compared to their peers.”

While general child-centered methods are common in primary schools, specialized teaching strategies to support students with disabilities are underutilized. “Inclusive education in Uganda is fragmented and under-resourced.” Barriers to inclusive primary education include limited teacher motivation and cooperation, especially in overcrowded classrooms. Some teachers struggle to see the benefits of inclusive practices. Schools often adjust expectations for students with disabilities due to inaccessible materials and insufficient teacher training, with adjustments varying by disability type. Effective inclusion requires adequate teacher training, access to specialized curricula and resources, and physically accessible schools and classrooms.

Although Uganda’s policies support inclusive education for students with disabilities, significant barriers persist for schools, teachers, families, and students. The need for improved school management practices to align with UPE policy implementation is critical. Inconsistent implementation across the country undermines expectations that students with disabilities will not only attend school alongside their peers without disabilities but also fully participate in society beyond the classroom.

== Secondary education ==
There is a significant disparity between enrolment rates in primary and secondary schools in Uganda. Census data from 2004 indicates that for every ten students enrolled in primary schools, only one is enrolled at a secondary institution. The Human Rights Measurement Initiative gives Uganda a score of 36%. The structure of Uganda's secondary education system follows the education system of its former colonial masters, Britain. It is divided into the Ordinary level and Advanced level.

Lower secondary consists of 4 years of schooling at the end of which students undertake Ordinary-level exams (O-level) in at least 8 subjects with a maximum of 10 subjects. Upper secondary consists of 2 years of schooling at the end of which students sit Advanced-level exams (A-level) in at least 3 subjects.

Three-year technical schools provide an alternative to lower secondary school. Alternatives for graduates from lower secondary school include: 2-3 year Technical institutes; 2 year Primary Teacher Colleges (PTC); Department Training Colleges (DTCs) and Upper secondary schools; including:

- Manafwa High School Mbale, mixed day and boarding (s1 to s6)
- Kitante Hill Secondary School - Mixed day school
- Seeta High School - Mixed boarding school (S1 to S6)
- St Mary's Secondary School Kitende
- Maryhill High School - Boarding girls' School in Mbarara (S.1 to S.6)
- Trinity College Nabbingo- Boarding girls' School. (S.1 to S.6)
- St. Mary's College Kisubi - All boy's boarding school
- Mount Saint Mary's College Namagunga - All-girl boarding school (S1 to S6)
- Kibuli Secondary School - Mixed day and boarding school (S1 to S6)
- Bugema Adventist Secondary School - Mixed boarding school(S1 to S6)
- King's College Budo - Mixed boarding school (S1 to S6)
- Gayaza High School - All-girl boarding school (S1 to S6) - Oldest girls secondary school
- Transform Educational Centre (Secondary, Kasangati) - Christian Private Secondary School, Mixed
- Uganda Martyrs' Secondary School Namugongo - Mixed Boarding School
- Mengo Senior School - Mixed day school
- Ndejje Senior Secondary School - Mixed boarding school (S1 to S6)
- Ntare School
- Yesu Akwagala high School-Kalungu Masaka. mixed day and boarding
- Nabumali High School
- St. Henry's College Kitovu
- St. Kizito S S Kabowa - Mixed day and boarding school (S1 to S6)
- Makerere College School
- Comboni College
- Kinaawa High School-mugongo- mixed school
- German Secondary School Uganda
- Kiira College Butiki - Boys' boarding school in Jinja (S1 to S6) founded in 1959
- Ebony College Luwero - Mixed day and boarding school (S1 to S6)
- Seat of Wisdom Secondary School- All-girl day and boarding school (S1 to S6)
- Sseguku Hill College- All-girl day and boarding school (S1 to S6)
- Mackay Memorial College Mixed day and boarding school located in Nateete (S1 to S6)
- Serere Township Secondary School- A Christian private "O" and "A" Level Mixed Day and Boarding School
- St.Lawrence Group Of schools.

=== Disability Education ===
According to the Uganda Demographic Health Survey (DHS) in 2016, 6.4% of people in Uganda are diagnosed with a disability. The World Report on Disability estimates the actual number of people with a disability is closer to15%. According to the same DHS data, 3.2% of youth reported disabilities in the areas of vision, hearing, mobility, communication, cognition, or self-care. Access to secondary education for these students is still a work in progress. As noted in the previous section, students in Uganda frequently end their formal education after primary school. This statistic is more significant for students with disabilities with only 9% attending secondary school.

Despite the low number of students with disabilities continuing their education, Uganda has taken disability inclusion and access seriously. “The country has ratified some of the most progressive disability laws and policies in the world and is home to a robust disability activist movement". In addition, Uganda ratified the United Nations Convention on the Rights of Persons with Disabilities on September 25, 2008. Which requires inclusive education within the educational system. This was followed up in 2020 with the ratification of the Persons with Disabilities Act of 2020. Education is specifically addressed in Chapter 115(6) with the “nondiscrimination in the provision or education services.” It states that “an institution of learning shall not discriminate against a learner with a disability, on the basis or disability.” This includes discrimination in admissions, expulsions, access to materials and facilities, and “any unfair treatment".

Unfortunately, these inclusive policies stand in contrast to reality...this leads to the conclusion that there is some sort of barrier between the actual school practice and the governmental standards and directions.” This disparity is frequently contributed to the “allocation of inadequate funds for education.”

We continue to see the lack of funding impact consistency of implementation of accessibility policy across the country. Physical accessibility standards are often not, or are unable to be, followed. “For example, ramps, hallways, doorframes, toilets, rails and clear signage are often inaccessible or unavailable. Further, few accessible learning materials are available in schools, including large print books for students with a visual impairment. Sign language interpreters are also rare.”

“A 2014 UNICEF study identified the lack of accessible and supportive learning environments the high cost of fees for private schools” as the reasons for the less than 1 in 10 students with disabilities in school. So, while there is potential for these policies to improve lives of people with disabilities, the focus needs to shift to implementation. Uganda has strong disability advocacy groups that would be great resources in navigating the implementation of these policies.

An additional note, any conversation regarding disability education in Uganda should include private institutions. About two thirds of all secondary schools belong to the private sector causing them to play a main role in practicing inclusive education.

Although the data shares a grim picture for secondary students with disabilities, there is an alternative perspective to consider. This perspective shifts the focus from what a student can or cannot do and instead focuses on belonging and connection to people and community. Drawing on the African notion of ubuntu, which is focused on human interdependence, or more directly translated, “I am because we are,” the focus moves away from the western view of education and challenges us to focus on all people being “interdependent beings who are part of a collective who derive their sense of identity by improving the common good for all." With this perspective in mind, conversations can shift away from individual student success and instead focus on creating spaces of connection and belonging for all, including students with disabilities, within and outside of the formal education system.

== International schools ==
International schools in Uganda
Name	Location	Population	founded
Acacia International School			
Aga Khan High School			
Bethel International Christian School			
Delhi Public School International			
Galaxy International School of Uganda			
Seven Hills International School			
Taibah International School			
Hana International School Uganda			
Heritage International School			
International School of Uganda	Kampala		
Rainbow International School	Kampala		
Kampala International School	Kampala		
Harvest International School			
MK International School	Busega, Kampala		2009
Christian International School			
Vienna College Namugongo	Namugongo		

== Post-secondary education ==
Although 60,000 to 70,000 students in Uganda leave secondary school each year qualified to go on to higher education, only some 35 percent of them (25,000) are able to find places at the limited number of institutions. The majority of students go to universities, both public and private. Makerere University in Kampala has about half of the total student population in Uganda's universities. The remainder are distributed among the more than 30 private universities and a smaller number of non-university institutions. Recognized universities in Uganda include:

=== Government universities ===
- Busitema University
- Gulu University
- Kabale University
- Kyambogo University
- Makerere University
- Mbarara University of Science & Technology
- Muni University
- Soroti University
- Lira University
- Mukwaya Johns University in Uganda

=== Religious-affiliated universities ===
- African Bible University
- Africa Renewal University, Buloba
- All Saints University
- Ankole Western University
- Bishop Stuart University
- Bugema University
- Busoga University
- Islamic University in Uganda
- Kumi University
- LivingStone International University
- Ndejje Christian University
- Uganda Christian University
- Uganda Martyrs University
- Uganda Pentecostal University
- Metropolitan International University
- University of Kisubi (UNIK)

=== Private secular universities ===
- International University of East Africa
- African Rural University
- Cavendish University Uganda
- International Health Sciences University
- Kayiwa University
- Muteesa I Royal University
- Kampala University
- ISBAT University
- Kampala International University
- Mountains of the Moon University
- Muteesa I Royal University
- Nkumba University
- Royal Open University
- St. Augustine International University
- St. Lawrence University
- Uganda Technology and Management University
- Victoria University
- Nile University

=== Vocational and technical education ===
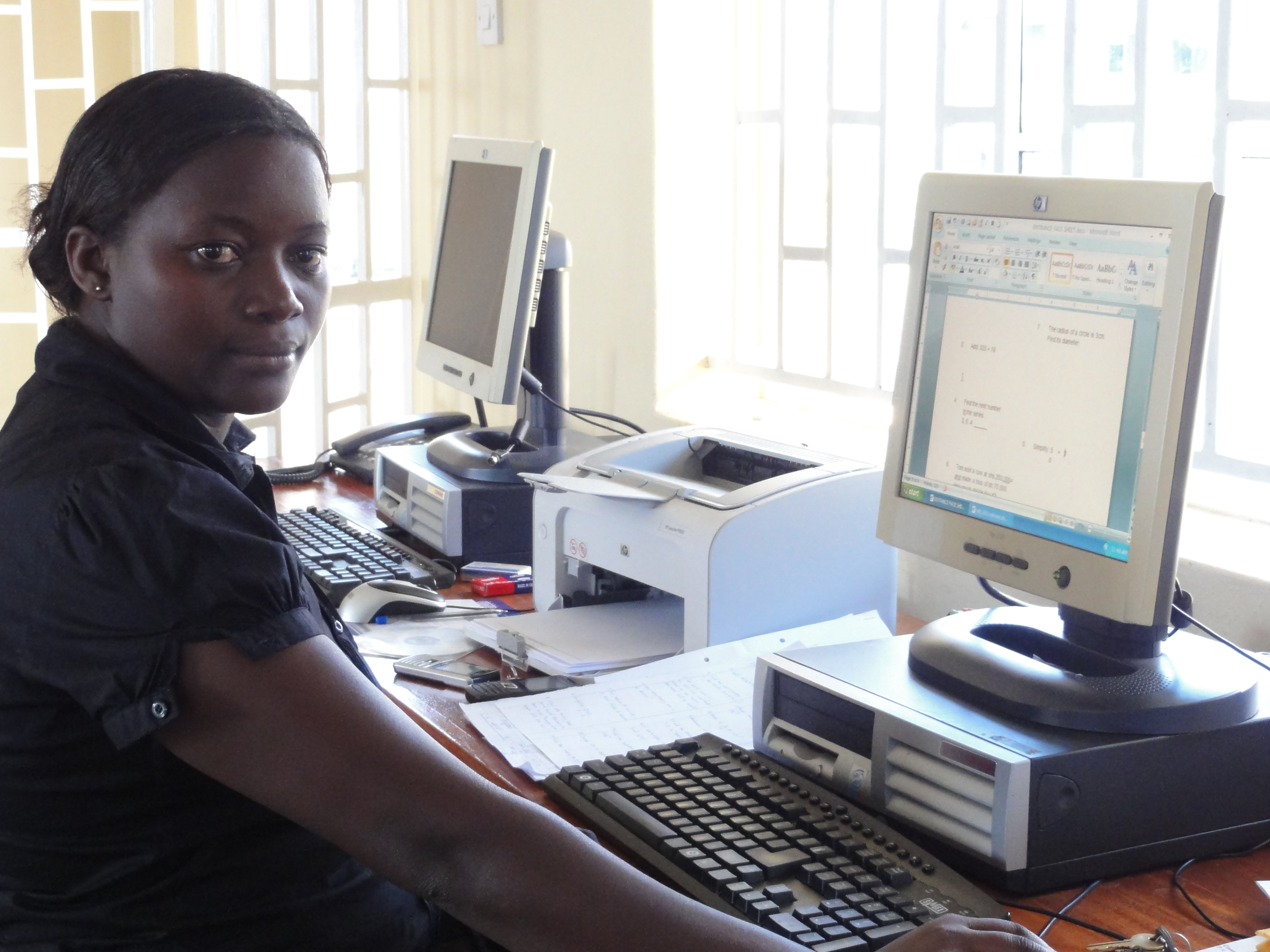
Ugandan Schools and Workplace training incorporate computer skills

Vocational and Technical Education is a necessary aspect of the education system in Uganda. The UN has led efforts to support this form of education through the UNESCO subdivision International Centre for Technical and Vocational Education and Training (TVET). According to a UN report, "Uganda’s TVET mission is defined as being to ensure that individuals and enterprises acquire the skills they need to raise productivity and income." These TVET programs range in both complexity and scope. Some provide for craftsmen or technician level training that replaces standard modes of secondary education, while some TVET programs provide graduate engineering level education to students seeking education at the tertiary or post secondary level.

=== Literacy programs ===
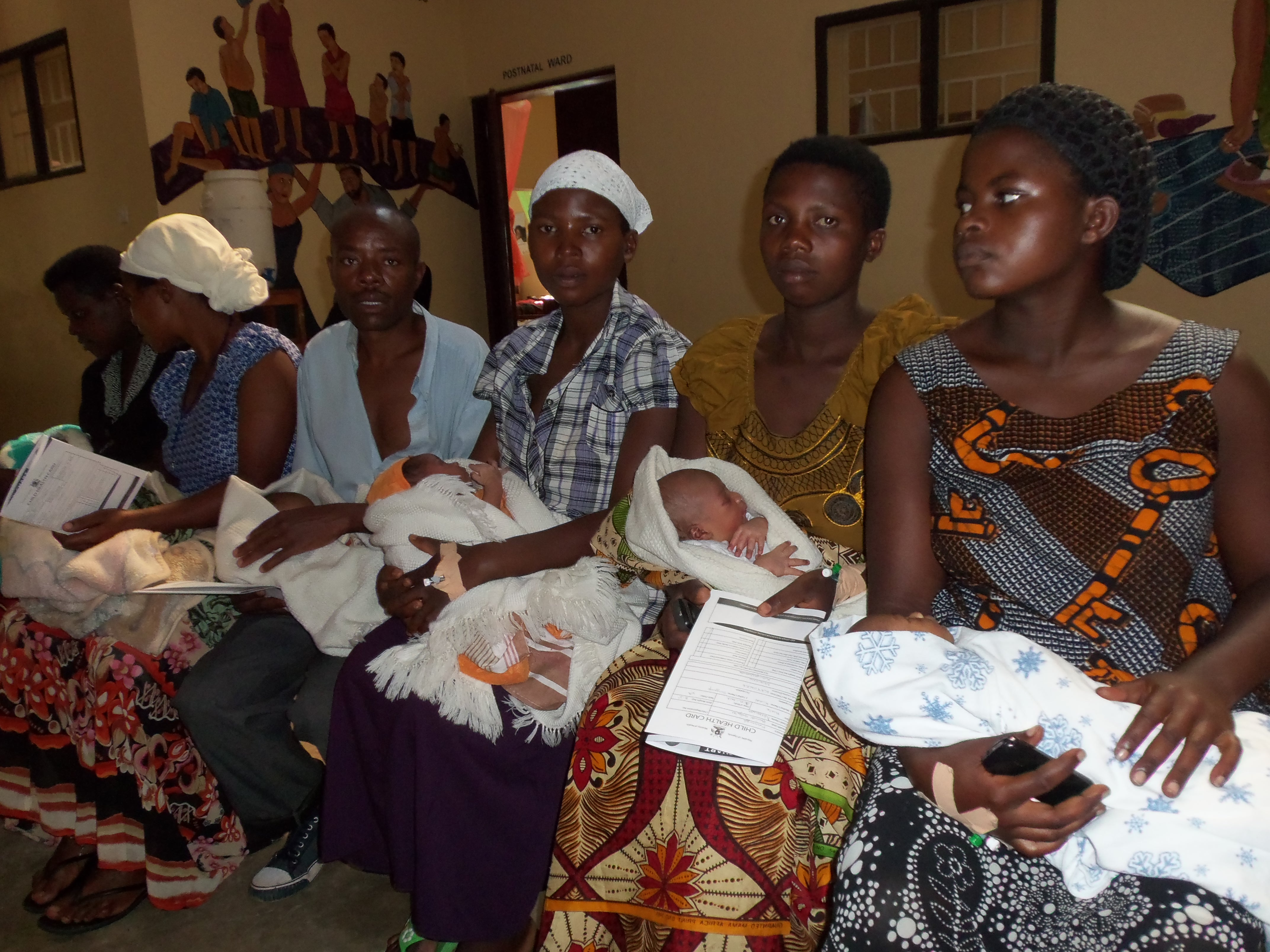
Young mothers receive communal based informal education

Early literacy movements were characterized by Western aid and leadership and have since given way to a more local decentralized approach to adult and youth literacy in Uganda. This transition is due in part to the realization of leaders in the West and in Uganda that literacy, and literacy in English particularly, is not a silver bullet for solving Uganda's economic issues. Much of the literacy work is conducted by NGOs acting on a local level in conjunction with local or village governments. There is a great demand for these programs, and their rates of return, satisfaction, and literacy retention for graduates have been high. However, these programs face great challenges including lack of funding, social reluctance, and a general lack of appreciation for literacy and literature.

=== Disability Education ===
Uganda has seemingly embraced inclusive education for post-secondary students. The Ugandan legal frameworks are largely in line with the requirements of attaining the right to education provided by the United Nations Human Rights framework and fundamental principles of inclusive education. The Constitution of the Republic of Uganda (1995) guarantees that all persons have a right to education. The intent of the constitution on higher education is reflected in the Universities and Other Tertiary Institutions Act (2001) and the Persons with Disability Act (2006).

The Universities and Other Tertiary Institutions Act (2001) establishes the National Council for Higher Education (NCHE) of Uganda and details with mandates. NCHE is tasked with the responsibility to ensure disability inclusion in institutions of higher learning and can revoke a provisional license to an institution if it finds it is not meeting the minimum requirements pertaining to physical infrastructure. The language in the Act is specific to public universities, which implies that the Act does not confer these obligations on private universities.

The Persons with Disability Act (2006) guarantees a right to quality education for all learners with disabilities. The Act imposes duties on institutions of higher learning to eliminate barriers to accessibility and prohibits discrimination in the provisions of goods, services, and facilities of which higher education is a provider.

Article 24 of the Convention on the Rights of Persons with Disabilities (CRPD) requires states to attain a right to education for persons with disabilities without discrimination and on the basis of equal opportunities at all levels of education. This commitment is demonstrated by the establishment of educational infrastructure aimed at mainstreaming disability, including a department of special needs education at the Ministry of Education, Science, Technology and Sports and representation of persons with disabilities at the National Council for Higher Education Board. The board must be composed of, among others, two representatives of persons with disabilities. In the perspective of disability, providing reasonable accommodations is one of the fundamental requirements for achieving substantive equality and is now a legal requirement of CRPD.

The impact of these developments is the increasing enrollment of students with disabilities in higher education. However, despite this legal framework on education, there is still evidence of exclusion and discrimination of students with disabilities in the higher education institutions. It appears that the overall higher education environment is not changing in response to access requirements for admitted students with disabilities. Institutions of higher learning lack disability policies, provide limited opportunities for admissions of candidates with disabilities, and lack support services for students with disabilities.

Despite these advancements, access to higher education for students with disabilities remains limited. While Uganda has made significant strides in primary and secondary education, only five percent of children with disabilities are educated in inclusive settings within regular schools, and another ten percent attend special schools. At the university level, affirmative action measures were introduced in 2007, setting aside 64 slots for students with disabilities. However, this number has proven inadequate given the increasing number of eligible students, leading to many students with disabilities being excluded from higher education opportunities. In 2022, the Ugandan government committed to expanding the affirmative action slots from 64 to 320. This commitment aims to address the gap in higher education access for students with disabilities and to promote inclusivity at the university level. Challenges in accessing higher education for students with disabilities include physical inaccessibility, inadequate assistive technologies, and negative societal attitudes.

According to Uganda’s National Population and Household Census, 2014, 14 percent of the population has a disability, a third of these are children and youth. Despite this significant demographic, persons with disabilities remain underrepresented in research, both as participants and as researchers, due to heightened disparities and barriers such as physical inaccessibility, lack of appropriate communication approaches, negative cultural beliefs and practices, lack of relevant training and adequate awareness raising methods and social stigma. These barriers lead to lack of data on their specific needs, perpetuating inequalities in policy and practice.

Inclusive research practices ensure that the voices and experiences of all community members are heard, generating data that is representative of persons with disabilities, leading to more equitable and effective interventions, which is critical for a country like Uganda, where diverse socio-economic, cultural, and health-related factors intersect. The development of students with disabilities into researchers can not only strengthen inclusive research practices in Uganda, but also set a foundation for the empowerment of young persons with disabilities in future policy development.

The government of Uganda supports various categories of disabilities in public universities, including visual impairments, auditory impairments, physical impairments, and cognitive impairments. This aligns with the recommendations of the World Report on Disability, which underscores the importance of recognizing diverse disability categories to improve access to higher education. Policies aimed at supporting students with disabilities in Uganda are established but often fall short in practice. While Uganda has established policies and structures to support students with disabilities, their inadequate implementation highlights significant gaps. Addressing these issues requires a multifaceted approach, including better funding, more data-driven decision-making, and active efforts to overcome bureaucratic and practical barriers. This should include expanding the number of government-sponsored slots, enhancing infrastructural accessibility, and investing in targeted pedagogical training for lecturers and well-resourced disability centers.

== Post-conflict Northern Uganda ==
Education is important for a successful post-conflict transition in Northern Uganda (see Conflict in Northern Uganda), as it helps develop peoples' abilities to break free of circles of violence and suffering. Uganda's Universal Primary Education (UPE) was initiated under the 1992 Uganda’s Government White Paper to achieve human development by providing the resources for every child to enter and remain in school up until secondary school, ensuring affordable education, and reducing poverty by providing individuals with basic skills. Uganda's Universal Primary Education (UPE) has resulted in high enrolment rates in Northern Uganda, but education tends to be of a low quality and few pupils actually complete primary school. There are inadequate facilities; e.g. out of 238 primary schools in Pader, 47 are still under trees, limited teacher accommodation is causing high rates of teacher absenteeism and in some areas the average primary school teacher to student ratio is 1:200.

Since 2006, when the conflict in Northern Uganda ended, the education system has needed sustained support, and it has played a role in post-war recovery and reconciliation. Along with the academic curriculum, teachers in this region are required to guide, support, and serve as role models to the students. Successful international donor-funded programs in northern Uganda have covered the costs of teacher trainings for secondary schools to ensure children stay in school and are taught adequate material that result in higher national test scores. A successful government program provided teachers' classroom aides who focused their attention on students who had fallen behind. It significantly improved the learning outcomes of these students.

There is evidence to suggest that completion of secondary school is necessary to provide an individual with a proper chance to escape poverty, as employment and income levels for those who completed only primary schools are similar to those who did not attend at all. Post-conflict Northern Uganda has particular difficulties as teachers are hard to find. The conflict created a lost generation without an adequate education themselves and teachers from other areas are still concerned about security in the region. Many lost family members during the conflict and forced displacement from their homes disrupted their lives and communities, leading to a loss of stability and support systems. Extra support for children in schools is needed to rebuild the immense loss of a support system, to provide life skills, and have someone they feel safe and comfortable going to after years of instability. Scholars say that boosting education will allow every child to grow up in an environment where they are empowered to contribute freely, safely, and fully to their own lives and those of others in their communities.

== Female education ==
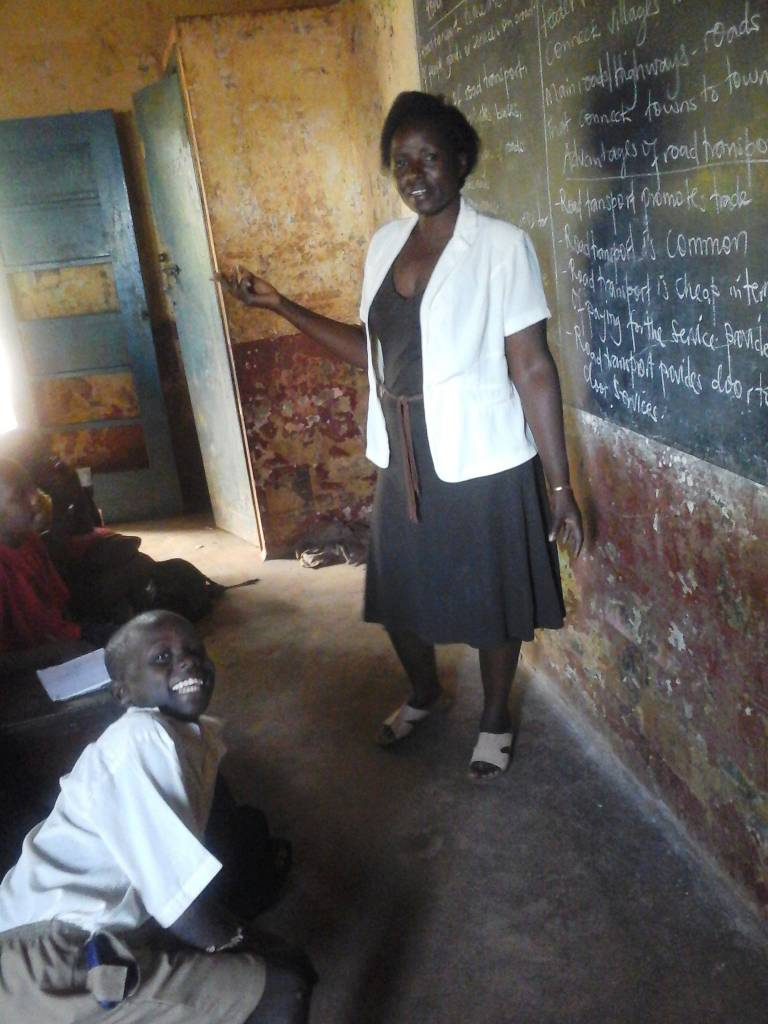
Young women receiving teacher training

Literacy discrepancies and educational inequity are a serious factor in the propagation of gender inequality. Challenges for girls and women include: inadequate infrastructure, social pressures, and early maternity. These barriers continue throughout a woman's life, as one cited challenge to adult females' participation in literacy education in Uganda is home life. A World Bank report found that a significant force in preventing attendance at adult literacy classes was husbands stopping their wives from attending. According to United Nations' Girls Education Initiative statistics, literacy rates for young females still lag behind that of young boys by five percent, and nearly half of all girls in Uganda are married before the age of 18. Studies have shown that marriage and pregnancy rates prior to the age of 18 is decreased by roughly 7% when girls receive an extra year of education.

Since 1997, UPE has aimed to bring equality of education to all the children of the country, specifically to those in rural, impoverished areas. It has had controversial results, but overall the UPE program has successfully allowed for higher enrollment, specifically among young girls. However, there is no clarity over whether there are true gender discrimination factors affecting whether the children go to school; it is noted that girls enrollment is dependent upon their age and their mother's level of schooling. Boys, on the other hand, are not affected by their father or mother's education level. Uganda received a score of.517 on the UN Development Programme Gender Equality index as reported in the Human Development Report. This measure evaluates the respective equality of women in various dimensions including: health, empowerment, and access to labor market.

Uganda implemented the National Strategy for Girls' Education (NSGE) in order to bring equality in the education system for both women and girls and indicates some of the various impediments to them obtaining an education, and particularly secondary education. Ultimately, the NSGE framework is more inclined to identify these barriers rather than offer insight to help overcome these obstacles such as location, menstruation, home responsibilities and overall attitudes within the school domain.

Menstruation is a barrier girls face limiting them to attend school. Since 2016, successful interventions in Ugandan schools include the distribution of reusable sanitary pad kits. This gives girls confidence to attend school without being held back by their menstruation. Providing essential resources like sanitary pads ensures better well-being and reinforces a sense of dignity and self-worth.

In 2007 the government implemented Universal Secondary Education (USE) with research showing that girls secondary public education enrollment rates increased approximately 49%. This policy is most beneficial to girls of poor households who otherwise would not have had the opportunity to attend due to fees and the general belief that boys secondary education yields more benefits than a girls. There are a few explanations for the increased enrollment aside from the USE policy such as poor or inaccurate reporting of student enrollment, the growing population, and new schools being built or included in the USE policy. Further, the overall performance since the USE has been utilized has decreased in the schools, as teachers are working in worse conditions and students are not as motivated, especially as their parents have now seen education as completely in the realm of the government whereas the policy meant to involve a plethora of actors to support children's education.

The government has attempted various policies targeted at adult education, with inconsistent results. These include: the Functional Adult Literacy (FAL) Programme, Women's Empowerment Programme (WEP), and the National Adult Literacy Strategic Investment Plan (NALSIP). Some results prove that these programmes have bettered the living conditions of women, as they have increased influence in decision making, greater economic accumulation, better self-esteem, and knowledge of their rights in society. However, these results are not widespread; many women do not register for these programmes, especially those in the rural parts of Uganda. The women who do choose to enroll often have low attendance rates or high drop-out rates.

== See also ==
- List of universities in Uganda
- List of Ugandan university leaders
- Education in Africa
