= List of business schools in Uganda =

The table below lists the accredited, university-based business schools available in Uganda as of August 2013. The list also includes the university that each school is affiliated with and whether the school is private or public. The schools are listed alphabetically.

List of business schools in Uganda
School	University	City	Private/public
Bugema University School of Business	Bugema University	Bugema	Private
Eastern and Southern African Management Institute; Business School - Kampala Campus	Eastern and Southern African Management Institute (ESAMI)	Kampala	Private
Gulu University Faculty of Business & Development Studies	Gulu University	Gulu	Public
Kabale University Department of Business & Economics	Kabale University	Kabale	Public
Kampala International University; School of Business & Management	Kampala International University	Kampala	Private
Kyambogo University; School of Management & Entrepreneurship	Kyambogo University	Kampala	Public
Makerere University Business School*	Makerere University Business School*	Kampala	Public
Makerere University School of Business	Makerere University	Kampala	Public
Mbarara University Institute of Management Sciences	Mbarara University of Science and Technology	Mbarara	Public
Mountains of The Moon University; School of Business & Management	Mountains of the Moon University	Fort Portal	Private
Muteesa I Royal University Faculty of Business Management	Muteesa I Royal University	Masaka	Private
Ndejje University Faculty of Business Administration	Ndejje University	Mengo	Private
Nkumba University School of Business Administration	Nkumba University	Entebbe	Private
St. Augustine International University School of Business & Wealth Creation	St. Augustine International University	Bunga	Private
Uganda Martyrs University Faculty of Business; Administration & Management	Uganda Martyrs University	Nkozi	Private
Uganda Management Institute; School of Business, Productivity and Competitiveness	Uganda Management Institute	Kampala	Public
Uganda Pentecostal University; Faculty of Business Administration]	Uganda Pentecostal University	Fort Portal	Private
Uganda Technology and Management University	Uganda Technology and Management University	Kampala	Private

- Makerere University Business School (MUBS) was formerly affiliated with Makerere University. The university has been granted autonomy to separate from its former parent institution. A new name is under formulation.

== See also ==
- List of universities in Uganda
- Education in Uganda
