= Bugolobi Wastewater Treatment Plant =

Wastewater and sewerage treatment plant in Uganda

Bugoloobi Wastewater Treatment Plant
- Location within Kampala
- Interactive map of Bugoloobi Wastewater Treatment Plant
- Location: Bugolobi, Nakawa Division, Kampala
- Coordinates: 00°19′06″N 32°36′27″E
- Estimated output: 45,000,000 liters (45,000 m^{3}) of wastewater daily
- Energy usage: 631 kilowatts (846 hp)
- Technology: Bio-filtration, Sedimentation
- Percent of water supply: Estimated 25% of Kampala Metropolitan Area
- Operation date: April 2021

Bugolobi Wastewater Treatment Plant (BWTP), also Bugolobi Sewerage Treatment Plant (BSTP), is a wastewater treatment project in Uganda. It is the largest wastewater treatment plant in the countries of the East African Community, and capable of processing 45,000,000 liters (45,000 m^{3}) of wastewater daily.

== Location ==
The water treatment facility was constructed in the neighborhood of Bugolobi, in Nakawa Division, in the south-eastern section of Kampala, the capital and largest city of Uganda. This is approximately 7 kilometres (4 mi), by road, southeast of the central business district of the city. The geographical coordinates of the plant are 0°19'06.0"N, 32°36'27.0"E (Latitude:0.318333; Longitude:32.607500).

== Overview ==
The Bugoloobi WTP, collects wastewater and sewerage from parts of the city, including Old Kampala, Mengo, Katwe, Nsambya, Kibuli, Mbuya, Nakawa, Naguru, Bukoto and Kamwookya. The new expanded STP is aimed at increasing and improving sanitation services in the city and reducing the pollution of the Nakivubo Channel, a surface-water effluent into Lake Victoria, thereby increasing the lake's environmental sustainability.

The project involves the construction of an ultra-modern sewerage treatment plant in Bugoloobi, a sewerage pre-treatment plant in Kinawattaka, a sewerage pumping station on Kibira Road and a sewer network measuring 31 kilometres (19 mi). New areas to be added to the sewerage network include Bugolobi, Kyambogo, Kasokoso, Kinnawattaka, Banda, Butabika and neighbouring areas.

The bio-digesters in this plant, are expected to generate gases, which will be heated to generate 630 kilowatts (840 hp) of electricity, to be used internally in the plant. In addition, the solid wastes removed from the wastewater, are expected to be dried and sold as fertilizer, or as raw material for the manufacture of cooking briquettes.

== Ownership ==
The water treatment facility is wholly owned by the National Water and Sewerage Corporation (NWSC), a government parastatal company, responsible for provision of potable water and sewerage services nationwide.

== Construction ==
Construction began in May 2014, and concluded in 2021. NWSC plans to construct new sewerage treatment plants in Nalukolongo, between Ndeeba and Nateete, along the Kampala–Masaka Road and in Kajjansi, in addition the one in Lubigi, completed in 2014.

== Financing ==
This project has received funding from (a) the government of Uganda, (b) the African Development Bank (c) the European Union and (d) KfW.

== See also ==
- Ministry of Water and Environment (Uganda)
