= Rachael Kungu =

Ugandan disc jockey, businesswoman and recording artist

- Born: 1978 (age 47–48); Uganda
- Citizenship: Uganda
- Occupations: Disc Jockey, Businesswoman, Recording Artist
- Years active: 1994 — present
- Website: Homepage

Rachael Ray Kungu, who uses the stage name DJ Rachael, (born c.1978), is a Ugandan disc jockey, businesswoman and recording artist, whose career spans over 25 years. She is the founder of Femme Electronic and proprietor of Scraych Rekords, a private audio studio.

In June 2017, Vice Magazine referred to Rachael Kungu, as "East Africa's first female DJ".

== Background and early life ==
Rachael Kungu was born in Uganda circa 1978, and she grew up in the upscale neighborhood called Muyenga, in present-day Makindye Division, within Uganda's capital city Kampala. In the 1990s, Hotel International Muyenga was popular for its day-time parties that were frequented by teenagers. Rachael was one of many teenagers that attended the groovy get-togethers. She became part of Muyenga Youth Club.

When Rachael was 13 years old, she watched on video Deidra Muriel Roper (DJ Spinderella), a female American deejay and rapper perform and she was mesmerized. The American artist had a profound influence on the young teenager. At the club, Rachael became introduced to international stars like Salt-n-Pepa, Roxanne Shante, MC Lyte, Run-DMC as well as Kid N Play. She started to imitate the way these international stars performed and also memorized how they rapped which skill earned her a spot at a deejay's box in town.

Since she was still a young teenager, her Uncle accompanied her to Club Pulsations, where DJ Wasswa Junior taught her how to use the turntable. She also sites DJ Alex Ndawula for teaching her some skills. Other instructors included the late DJ Berry.

== Career ==
DJ Rachael began her career as a disc jockey in 1995 and when she could finally stand on her own, other club owners started offering her opportunities to work at their clubs. She left Club Pulsations and joined Club Silk where she worked for eight years as an official and professional disc jockey. While there, she had time to fulfil contracts to play at public and private parties.

She gained increasing recognition and received contracts to play at Club Sombreros in Jinja and was hosted at Club Florida 2000 and at Club Carnival, both in Nairobi and Stone Club in Mwanza. Ugandan radio show Saturday Night Mix Show recognised the importance of DJ Rachael in Ugandan electronic music. She performed at Nyege Nyege Festival in 2017.

In 2015, BBC Radio 1Xtra chose DJ Rachael as one of Africa's top DJs and musicians, inviting her to discuss music in Uganda. With increased recognition, DJ Rachael has been invited to participate in engagements overseas, including the WOMEX World Music Expo 2016 in Spain, the opening of Impact Hub, an arts space in Florence, Italy in 2017 and at a DAPHNE series event by Marea Stamper, in Chicago, Illinois, United States in January 2017.

Kungu has also branched out into music production, training with and mentoring others to increase her skill. Since 2016, she has held monthly workshops for 25 female participants. Her initiative, Femme Electronic, formally launched in 2016 to support female DJs and electronic dance music producers. That year, she held workshops with the Goethe-Institut and Santuri East Africa.

In 2017, Dazed acknowledged DJ Rachael as one of "5 East African musicians you need to know" and DJ Mag wrote about her work to change the face of electronic music. In 2018, OkayAfrica shortlisted her as one of the top 10 house musicians in Kenya and Uganda and Electronic Beats reported on how DJ Rachael was changing Ugandan society through music.

== Other considerations ==
Rachael Kungu is an active advocate for women's rights and the rights of the LGBT+ community.
