= List of universities in Uganda =

This is a list of universities in Uganda.

== Private universities ==
List of private universities in Uganda
No.	Abbreviation	Name of university	Location	Established
1	AfRU	Africa Renewal University	Buloba	2013
2	ARU	African Rural University	Kagadi	2017
3	ISBAT	ISBAT University	Kampala	2005
4	AKU	Aga Khan University	Kampala	2001
5	ASU	All Saints University	Lira	2008
6	AWU	Ankole Western University	Kabwohe	2005
7	BSU	Bishop Stuart University	Mbarara	2003
8	BMU	Bugema University	Bugema	1997
9	CUU	Cavendish University Uganda	Kampala	2008
10	GLRU	Great Lakes Regional University	Kanungu	2009
11	CIU	Clarke International University	Muyenga	2008
12	IUEA	International University of East Africa	Kansanga	2011
13	IUIU	Islamic University in Uganda	Mbale	1988
14	KIU	Kampala International University	Kansanga	2001
15	KU	Kampala University	Ggaba	2005
16	KUMU	Kumi University	Kumi	1996
17	LIU	LivingStone International University	Budaka	2011
18	MRU	Muteesa I Royal University	Masaka	2007
19	NDU	Ndejje University	Ndejje	1992
20	NIU	Nexus International University (formerly VUU)	Kampala	2012
21	NKU	Nkumba University	Nkumba	1999
22	NSU	Nsaka University	Jinja	2013
23	KCU	King Ceasor University (formerly St. Augustine International University)	Kampala	2012
24	SLAU	St. Lawrence University	Mengo	2006
25	SIU	Stafford University Uganda	Kisugu	2015.
26	UCU	Uganda Christian University	Mukono	1997
27	UMU	Uganda Martyrs University	Nkozi	1993
28	UNIK	University of Kisubi	Kisubi	2004
29	UPU	Uganda Pentecostal University	Fort Portal	2005
30	USHG	University of the Sacred Heart Gulu	Gulu	2016
31	UTAMU	Universal Technology and Management University	Kampala	2012
32	VU	Victoria University Uganda	Kampala	2011
33	IU	Ibanda University	Ibanda	2014
34	LKU	Limkokwing University of Creative Technology	Namataba	2019
35	ABU	African Bible University	Lubowa	2005
36	MIU	Metropolitan International University	Kisoro	2013
37	AKU	Aga Khan University, Kampala	Kampala	2025

== Public universities ==
List of public universities In Uganda
Rank	Abbreviation	Name of university	Location	Established
1	BUS	Busitema University	Busitema	2007
2	GU	Gulu University	Gulu	2004
3	KABU	Kabale University	Kabale	2001
4	KYU	Kyambogo University	Kyambogo	2003
5	LU	Lira University	Lira	2012
6	MUK	Makerere University	Makerere	1922
7	MUBS	Makerere University Business School	Nakawa	1997
8	MUST	Mbarara University of Science and Technology	Mbarara	1989
9	MU	Muni University	Arua	2014
10	SUN	Soroti University	Soroti	2015
11	UMI	Uganda Management Institute	Kampala	1968
12	MMU	Mountains of the Moon University	Fort Portal	2005
13	BU	Busoga University	Iganga	

== Military universities ==
List of Ugandan military universities
Rank	Abbreviation	Name of institution	Location	Established
1	UMEC	Uganda Military Engineering College	Lugazi	2007
2	UMA	Uganda Military Academy	Kabamba	2010
3	USCSC	Uganda Senior Command and Staff College	Kimaka	2010
4	UJCSC	Uganda Junior Staff College	Jinja	2010
5	NDCU	National Defence College, Uganda	Njeru	2022

== Other degree-awarding institutions ==
Other accredited degree-awarding institutions
Rank	Abbreviation	Name of institution	Location	Established
1	KPI	Kigumba Petroleum Institute	Kigumba	2009
2	IAIT	India Africa Institute of Trade	Kampala	2011
3	IPSK	Institute of Petroleum Studies Kampala	Muyenga	2013

== See also ==
- Education in Uganda
- List of business schools in Uganda
- List of law schools in Uganda
- List of medical schools in Uganda
- List of university leaders in Uganda
