= Najjanankumbi =

- Map of Kampala showing the location of Najjanankumbi
- Coordinates: 00°16′20″N 32°34′30″E
- Country: Uganda
- Region: Central Region
- District: Kampala Capital City Authority
- Division: Lubaga Division
- Elevation: 1,240 m (4,070 ft)
- Time zone: UTC+3 (EAT)

Najjanankumbi is an area in the Lubaga Division of Uganda, on the southern edge of the city of Kampala.

== Location ==
Najjanankumbi is located on the southern edge of the city of Kampala.

It is bordered by Kibuye to the north, Lukuli to the east, Makindye to the southeast, Lubowa to the south, Kabowa to the west, and Ndeeba to the northwest. This location is approximately 5 kilometres (3.1 mi), by road, south of the central business district of Kampala.

== Overview ==
Najjanankumbi is a residential and business location, with numerous shops, restaurants, bars, and small one- or two-room rental residences. The Forum for Democratic Change, the main Ugandan opposition political party, has its headquarters at Najjanankumbi.

== NGOs ==
Some non-profit entities working in Najjanankumbi are:

- Uganda Australia Christian Outreach - A non-governmental organization providing free healthcare to local residents
- The headquarters of the Uganda Local Governments Association

== See also ==
- Kampala Capital City Authority
- Makindye Division
- Diamond Trust Bank (Uganda)
