= Institute of Petroleum Studies Kampala =

School in Uganda

- Type: Private
- Established: 2013
- Principal: James Mugerwa
- Location: Kampala, Uganda; 00°17′56″N 32°36′34″E
- Campus: Urban
- Website: www.ipsk.ac.ug
- Location in Kampala

Institute of Petroleum Studies Kampala, IPSK, is a privately owned institution that offers training and instruction in the field of petroleum exploration, recovery, refinement and responsible utilization in Uganda.

== Location ==
The campus of the institute is located at Plot 6207 Rose Lane Tank hill, in the Muyenga neighborhood, in the Makindye Division of Kampala, the capital and largest city in the country. This is about 6.5 kilometres (4 mi) by road southeast of the central business district of the city.

== Overview ==
The institute was founded in 2013. The first principal of the institute was Brian Sallery. The institute offers courses that lead to the award of certificates, diplomas, degrees and master's degrees in oil and gas management.

== Academics ==
The institute offers the following courses:

Certificates courses

- Certificate in Oil & Gas

Diploma courses

- Diploma Oil & Gas Management

Undergraduate courses

- Bachelor of Science in Oil & Gas Management
- Bachelor of Science in Environmental Health & Safety Management

Postgraduate courses

- Master of Business Administration in Oil & Gas
- Master of Laws in Oil & Gas
- Master of Science in Environmental Health & Safety Management.

== See also ==
- Ugandan university leaders
- List of universities in Uganda
- Education in Uganda
