= CUU =

CUU may refer to:

- General Roberto Fierro Villalobos International Airport
- Cavendish University Uganda, a Ugandan university established in Kampala in 2008
- Cursor Up (ANSI), an ANSI X3.64 escape sequence
- a codon for the amino acid leucine
