= Anne Devereux-Mills =

American businesswoman, author, public speaker and entrepreneur

- Anne Louise Brandzel
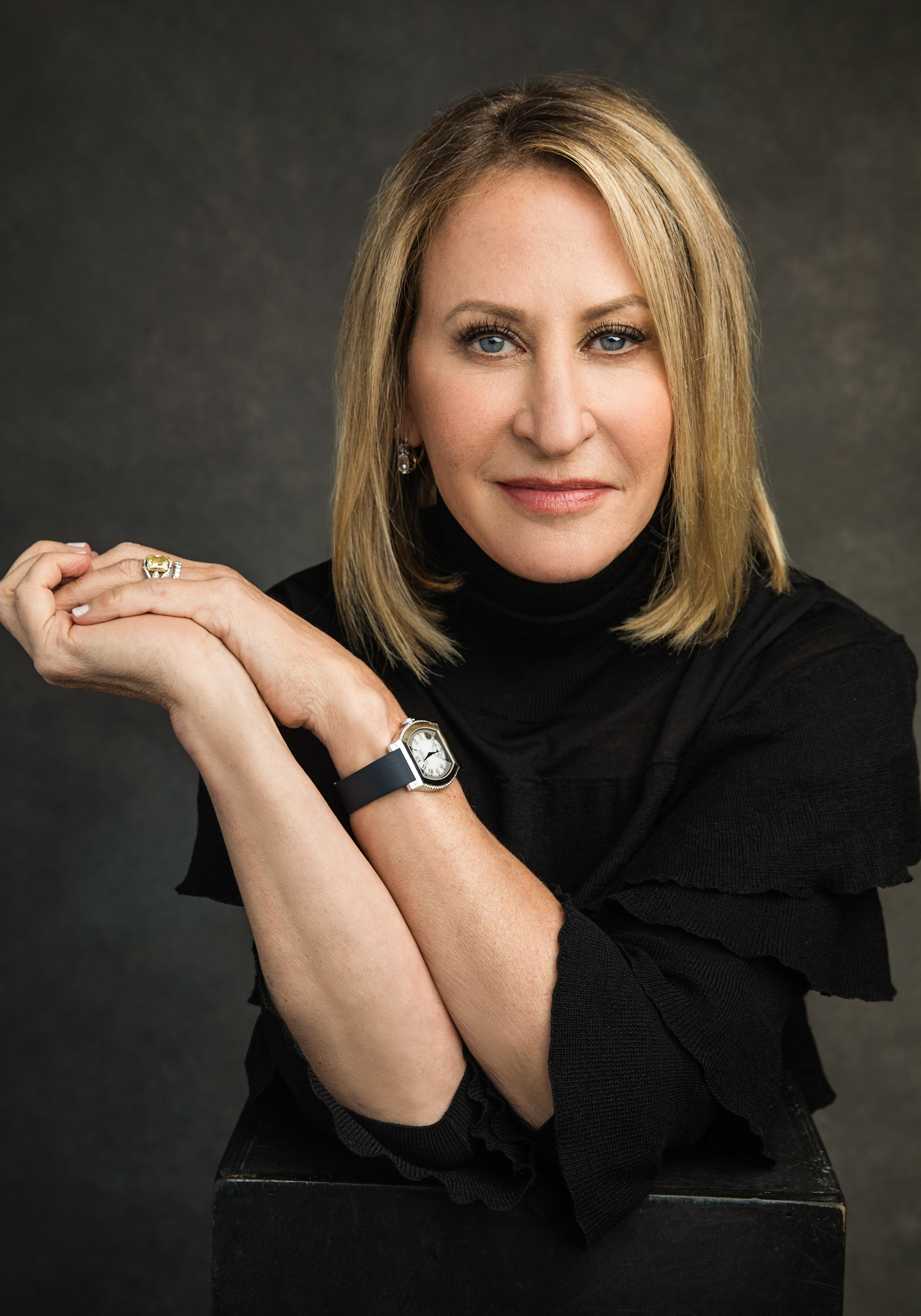
- Born: March 2, 1962 (age 64); Seattle, Washington, United States
- Education: Wellesley College (B.A.)
- Occupations: Public speaker, co-host of bring a friend podcast, founder of parlay house, business executive

Anne Devereux-Mills (born March 2, 1962) is an American businesswoman, author, public speaker and entrepreneur. Anne Devereux-Mills spent the first 25 years of her career building and leading advertising agencies in New York City. She is now co-host of the Bring a Friend podcast and the Chief Instigator (and Founder) of Parlay House, a 7000+ member organization in 12 cities worldwide that champions and inspires women to connect and make meaningful changes for themselves and for others.

== Early life ==
Anne Devereux-Mills was born in Seattle, Washington, the daughter of Gene Bruce Brandzel and Elizabeth Ettenheim Brandzel and sister to Rachel Brandzel Weil and Susan Brandzel. She attended John Muir Elementary School, Eckstein Middle School and the Lakeside School. Devereux-Mills left Seattle in 1980 to attend Wellesley College in Wellesley, Massachusetts where she became President of the Senior Class and an active member of College Government.

== Career ==
Devereux-Mills began her career in the Political Risk Department of Marsh and McLennan in New York City, but after just a few years, she realized that her strengths lay elsewhere. Parlaying her skills in communications and client management through a series of career experiments, she found herself in the field of advertising where she specialized in healthcare. Once landing in a field that combined her strengths and her passions, she quickly climbed the corporate ladder, helping found the first Direct-to-consumer advertising agency for healthcare brands, called Consumer Healthworks, part of WPP. A few years later, she moved to Omnicom Group, building a direct to consumer practice for Harrison and Star where she went on to become president, then to Merkley and Partners where she was CEO of the Healthcare Division. From Merkley, she moved to BBDO where she was CEO of BBDO World Health as well as managing director and Chief Integration Officer. She then transitioned to TBWA\Chiat\Day as CEO of the global healthcare practice as well as chairman and CEO of LLNS.

Devereux-Mills left the field of advertising in 2009. Hit with the triple threat of progressing cancer, opting to have cancer surgery, Devereux-Mills moved to San Francisco where she founded Parlay House, a salon-style gathering for women that now has a national presence and thousands of members who come together to connect about what they care about rather than what they "do". She is an active mentor of the SHE-CAN organization which takes high-performing women from post-genocide countries and helps them gain an American education so that they can then return to their countries and become the next generation of leaders. Devereux-Mills was one of the first supporting members of the iHUG Foundation which helps break the cycle of poverty for children in Kabalagala, Uganda by augmenting education with nutrition, healthcare and support services.

Until her retirement in April 2019, Devereux-Mills was one of a handful of women to serve as chairman of the board of a public company in her role at Marchex in Seattle, Washington. Devereux-Mills first served as a director on the Marchex board beginning in 2006, and was appointed Chairman in October 2016. Marchex is a leader in mobile marketing and call analytics. She was also on the Board of Lantern, a company that brought Cognitive Behavioral Therapy (CBT) to people through mobile technology, thereby expanding access to clinical help and reduced the cost of care. Combining her career success, her interest in creating opportunities to connect and empower women as well as her natural leadership skills, Devereux-Mills is now a public speaker, who is focusing on issues of female empowerment, reframing reciprocity, and creating a new version of feminism that can address the issues so prevalent in our society.

== Book: The Parlay Effect ==
In The Parlay Effect: The Transformative Power of Female Connection, Anne Devereux-Mills uses her insights as Founder of Parlay House to show how small actions can result in a meaningful boost in self-awareness, confidence and vision. Through a combination of scientific research and personal stories, The Parlay Effect offers a blueprint for anyone who is going through a life transition who wants to find and create communities that have a positive and multiplying effect in their impact.

== Honours and awards ==
- Working Mother of the Year from the She Runs It, (formerly Advertising Women of New York)
- Leading Women in Technology from the All-Stars Foundation
- Activist of the Year from Project Kesher
- The Return, her documentary received a 2017 Emmy- nomination

== Recorded talks ==
- The Guild: Reframing Reciprocity, 2017
- Watermark: Doing Well By Doing Good, 2016
- The Battery: Small Actions Have Ripple Effects in Social Justice Reform, 2016
- SHE-CAN: Pulling Women Forward SHE-CAN: Revolution 2.0, 2015
