= Sebastian Munulo =

Businessman and hotel owner in Uganda

- Born: 1960 (age 65–66); Uganda
- Citizenship: Uganda
- Occupation: Businessman
- Years active: 1978 — present

Sebastian Munulo (born 1960) is a businessman and hotel owner in Uganda. In 2012, the New Vision newspaper listed him among the wealthiest people in Uganda.

== Businesses and investments ==
Among his holdings are the Mwaana Highway Hotel in Ndeeba, and the Mwaana Highway Hotel, the Mwaana Nursery and Primary School, residential houses for rent, and large tracts of land in Iganga District.
