= University of the Sacred Heart =

University of the Sacred Heart may refer to:

- University of the Sacred Heart (Puerto Rico) in Puerto Rico
- University of the Sacred Heart (Japan) in Japan
- University of the Sacred Heart Gulu, in Uganda
- Università Cattolica del Sacro Cuore, with campuses in several cities in Italy
