= Stafford University Uganda =

Private university in Uganda

Stafford University Uganda (SUU)
- Motto: We Shall Overcome
- Type: Private
- Established: 2015
- Chancellor: Vacant
- Academic staff: 50+ (2017)
- Students: 700+ (2017)
- Location: Kampala, Uganda; 00°18′12″N 32°36′20″E
- Campus: Urban
- Website: suu.ac.ug

Stafford University Uganda (SUU) is a private university in Uganda that was established in 2015 after receiving a licence from the Uganda National Council for Higher Education (UNCHE).

== Location ==
As of December 2018, the university intends to set up its main campus on 2 acres (1 ha) of land in Omirio Village, Opuyo Parish in Soroti City East in Eastern Uganda, approximately 4.6 kilometres (3 mi), by road, south-east of the city centre.

== History ==
In 2017, the UNCHE put the university on six months notice, and an investigation team appointed by the UNCHE recommended further investigation into the irregular graduation of over 300 students in conjunction with JOBKEY University. and finally the provisional licence of the university was Revoked on 30/Nov/18. Student who graduated before 30/Nov/18 are to remain official graduates recognised by the UNCHE https://unche.or.ug/

== Overview ==
The university was established in 2014. It offers courses that lead to the award of certificates, diplomas, and degrees, with study modalities that include day, evening, and weekend sessions.

== Academics ==
As of December 2017, the university's academics were organised through the following faculties:

=== Faculty of Humanities and Social Sciences ===
The faculty is divided into the following departments, each led by a departmental head.

- Journalism & Communication Studies
- Development Studies
- Public Administration & Political Studies
- Social Work & Social Administration
- Sociology & Psychology

=== Faculty of Business & Management ===
The following academic courses are offered in this faculty:

- Master of Business Administration (MBA) (generic)
- MBA in marketing
- MBA accounting and finance
- MBA in entrepreneurship
- MBA in human resource management
- MBA in project management and practice
- MBA in business finance and economics
- Postgraduate diploma in business administration

=== Faculty of Science & Technology ===
The following academic courses are offered in this faculty:

- Bachelor of Information Technology
- Bachelor of Science in computer science
- Bachelor of Science in public health

== See also ==
- List of universities in Uganda
