= Prudence Ukkonika =

Ugandan winemaker

Prudence Kasibante Ukkonika
- Born: Rukungiri District, Uganda
- Education: Makerere University Business School
- Occupation: Entrepreneur
- Known for: Founder and Managing Director of K-Roma Ltd (Bella Wine)
- Notable work: Bella Wine brand and agro-processing initiatives
- Spouse: Seraph Amen Ukkonika
- Children: 6

Prudence Kasibante Ukkonika is a Ugandan business administrator, entrepreneur, founder and managing director of K-Roma Ltd (Bella wine) an indigenous business entity that manufactures, packages and distributes Bella wine, natural fruit concentrates, juices and Teas.. Born in Rukungiri, a district in Uganda.

== Background ==
Ukkonika's father, the late Ludovic Kasibante, was a known wine trader and first licensed distiller of local waragi (gin in Uganda) and had a big bar in Rukungiri district when Ukkonika was an infant, this is where her interest in wine making stemmed from.

Ukkonika started making wine on a small scale in 2000 inspired by her deceased son Godwin Ukkonika who initiated the wine-making concept in the family. She started by buying wine from the village and selling it in Kampala.

And to understand the dynamics of business, Ukkonika enrolled for a Bachelor's degree in business administration at Makerere University business school with her son, she majored in management , while her son majored in Accounting. Currently, she is the manager and marketer, while her son is the accountant.

In 2013, she took winemaking courses and attained all her business degrees after age 31 and giving birth to 6 children in 7 years.

== Career ==
Before venturing into wine, Ukkonika was an employee of Ministry of finance, where she worked for 37 years.

After the demise of her son, she decided to let the dream of her son of wine making to live on. She started producing wine in her garage at home, she later rented a place in muyenga(a Kampala suburb) where she stored the wine in 200 liter drums, she then rented in Wandegeya, another busy city suburb where the main offices are currently. She later set up a factory in Kira.

Ukkonika currently employs 20 people in addition to her children; her firstborn studied food technology and her master's degree was in wine making and is the company consultant of this family business. Her son is the company accountant and another is the company driver and mechanic.

K-Roma currently has an estimated net worth of $350,000.

Ukkonika works with Ugandan farmers, most of whom are women, growing fruits.

She is currently into manufacturing and exporting bella wine in Uganda, Rwanda, Tanzania , and Kenya.

== Family ==
Prudence Kasibante Ukkonika is married to Seraph Amen Ukkonika with whom they have 6 children.
