= ISBAT University =

Ugandan university

ISBAT University (ISBAT)
- Type: Private
- Established: 2005; 21 years ago
- Chancellor: Fred Omach
- Vice-Chancellor: Mathew Mathai Kattampackal
- Location: Kampala, Uganda; 00°20′04″N 32°36′05″E
- Campus: Urban Main Campus
- Website: Homepage
- Location in Kampala

ISBAT University (ISBAT), whose complete name is International Business, Science And Technology University, is a chartered university in Uganda.

== History ==
The university was established in 2005 as a post-secondary (tertiary) institution of education, that was affiliated with Sikkim Manipal University of India. At that time all courses and academic courses belonged to and were awarded by the Indian university.

In 2013 ISBAT began awarding its own degrees and changed its classification to "Other Degree Awarding Institution" (ODAI). In 2015, the university moved to its present campus off of Lugogo Bypass Road. In 2016, ISBAT was elevated to a full university, having met the requirements of the Uganda National Council for Higher Education (UNCHE). On 18 November 2019, the university acquired charter status from the UNCHE.

== Overview ==
As of May 2019, ISBAT University is associated with UCAM University Spain and with Manipal University Dubai. It is a member of the Association of Commonwealth Universities (ACU), the Association to Advance Collegiate School of Business (AACSB), and the International Assembly for Collegiate Business Education (IACBE).

== Community social responsibility ==
In April and May 2019, ISBAT University hosted a neurosurgery, pediatric cardiology and oncology medical camp run by physicians and surgeons from Apollo Hospitals Enterprise Limited from India. The visiting doctors offered free consultations to over 200 patients.

== Computing and Technology ==
ISBAT University has been consistently ranked among Uganda's leading institutions for technology education since its establishment, offering programmes spanning information technology, computer science, networking, cybersecurity, engineering, and artificial intelligence. In 2021, ISBAT effectively absorbed the operations of Aptech Computer Education in Uganda, which had operated in the country since 1999 and trained over 17,000 students in East Africa over more than two decades, rebranding its premises as the ISBAT University City Campus following accreditation by the Uganda National Council for Higher Education.

Building on this foundation, the university has expanded into artificial intelligence and robotics, offering a Bachelor of Science in Artificial Intelligence and Machine Learning and a Bachelor of Engineering in Robotics and Artificial Intelligence, supported by a dedicated AI and Robotics Laboratory on its Lugogo Bypass campus. In 2023, a team of four third-year AI students won Shs11.1 million in the Revolution Hackathon Uganda, organised by TotalEnergies Uganda through OutBox Uganda, applying AI algorithms to identify optimal electric vehicle charging locations across Kampala. The university also developed Uganda's first functional humanoid robot, unveiled in 2026 at a ceremony presided over by State Minister for Planning Amos Lugoloobi. Alumni of the AI programme include Eric Jagwara, an AI engineer who has represented Uganda in international platforms including the ITU AI for Good initiative.

At ISBAT's 18th graduation ceremony in November 2025, held under the theme Transforming Higher Education by Integrating Emerging Technologies, the Minister for ICT Chris Baryomunsi called for expanded AI and robotics training as a driver of national GDP growth.

== See also ==
- Education in Uganda
- List of universities in Uganda
- Ugandan university leaders
