= Great Lakes Regional University =

Private university in Uganda

Great Lakes Regional University (GLRU)
- Type: Private
- Established: 2015; 10 years ago
- Chancellor: George Tumwesigye
- Location: Kanungu, Uganda; 00°53′05″S 29°45′22″E
- Campus: Rural
- Website: Homepage
- Location in Uganda

Great Lakes Regional University (GLRU) is a private university in Uganda. The university is accredited by the Uganda National Council for Higher Education (UNCHE).

== Location ==
The university campus is located outside of the town of Kanungu, in Kanungu District, in the Western Region of Uganda, approximately 136 kilometres (85 mi), by road, northwest of Kabale, the nearest large town and the largest urban centre in Kigezi sub-region. This is about 420 kilometres (261 mi), by road, southwest of Kampala, the capital of Uganda and its largest city. The geographical coordinates of the university campus are: 0°53'05.0"S, 29°45'22.0"E (Latitude:-0.884722; Longitude:29.756111).

== History ==
The institution was founded in the early 2000s as a private "tertiary" institution of education, by Hamlet Kabushenga, a former member of parliament for Kinkizi East Constituency. The university received accreditation from the UNCHE, under the name Great Lakes Regional College, in 2009.

The college began graduating students with diplomas and certificates in 2010, and in 2015 it held its 5th graduation ceremony. That same year, the institution received accreditation as a university and it admitted its pioneer class of undergraduates.

== Academics ==
As of January 2018, the following courses were offered at the university.

Undergraduate courses

- Bachelor of Archives and Records Management
- Bachelor of Agribusiness Management
- Bachelor of Business Administration
- Bachelor of Computer Science
- Bachelor of Development Studies
- Bachelor of Guidance and Counselling
- Bachelor of Human Resource Management
- Bachelor of Information Technology
- Bachelor of Library and Information Science
- Bachelor of Microfinance & Cooperatives Management
- Bachelor of Office and Information Management
- Bachelor of Procurement and Logistics Management
- Bachelor of Public Administration and Management
- Bachelor of Social Work and Social Administration
- Bachelor of Arts Education (Economics, History, English Language, Christian Religious Education, Geography & Kiswahili).
- Bachelor of Science Education (Biology, Physics, Mathematics, Agricultural Science & Economics)
- Bachelor of Sustainable Agriculture and Extension
- Bachelor of Tourism and Hotel Management
- Diploma in Christian Ministry & Entrepreneurship

Diploma courses

- Diploma in Secondary Education
- Diploma in Primary Education
- Diploma in Early Childhood Education

Certificate courses

- Certificate in Primary Education
- Certificate in Early Childhood Education

== See also ==
- List of universities in Uganda
- List of university leaders in Uganda)
- Education in Uganda
