= Metropolitan International University =

Private university in Kisoro, Uganda

Coordinates: 0.3423°N 32.5412°E

Metropolitan International University (MIU) is a secular private university licensed and accredited by National Council for Higher Education (UNCHE) in Uganda. MIU is located in Kisoro in South Western Uganda and has a second campus in Kampala, Namungoona on plot 281 along Nakibinge road.

== Overview ==
MIU was established in late 2017 by private Ugandan individuals with a license to operate as university, offering Diploma, Bachelors courses and Masters programs. It is currently ranked 33rd in Uganda and as the best University in Kisoro.

On 25 February 2022, it held its fourth graduation ceremony at the main campus in which a total number of 1323 students were crowned with different qualifications at the levels of degrees, diplomas, certificates.

The function was presided over by the University Chancellor Dr. Philemon Mateke alongside his Vice Chancellor Dr. Arineitwe Julius. The guest of honor was the first Deputy Prime Minister and Minister for East African affairs Hon. Rebecca Alitwala Kadaga alongside the state minister for youth and children affairs Sarah Mateke Nyirabashitsi.

The university has a board of trustees, university senate and university council that oversees all university activities. Currently the Chancellor is Dr Philemon Mateke and Vice Chancellor is Dr Julius Arinaitwe.

== Academics ==
As of 2019 Metropolitan University offers the following programs:

=== Faculty of Education and Humanities ===
| Bachelors of Arts with Education | 3 Years |
| Bachelors of Science with Education | 3 Years |
| Bachelors of Science in Marketing | 3 Years |
| Bachelors of Commerce | 3 Years |
| Bachelors Bachelors of Arts in International Relations & Diplomatic Studies | 3 Years |
| Bachelors of Social Works & Social Administration | 3 Years |
| Bachelors of Journalism and Media Studies | 3 Years |
| Bachelors of Education(Primary/Secondary) | 3 Years |
| Bachelors of Public Administration & Management | 3 Years |
| Bachelors of Tourism & Hotel Management | 3 Years |
| Diploma in Education-Secondary | 2 Years |
| Diploma in Education(DES/DEP) In service only | 2 Years |

=== Faculty of Science and Technology ===
| Bachelors of Information technology (BIT) | 3 Years |
| Bachelors of Computer Science (BCS) | 3 Years |
| Bachelors of Business Computing (BBC) | 3 Years |
| Bachelor of Agribusiness Management | 3 Years |
| Bachelor of Agricultural and Rural Innovation | 3 Years |
| Diploma in Information Technology (DIT) | 2 Years |
| Diploma in Computer Science (DCS) | 2 Years |
| Diploma in Business Computing (DBC) | 2 Years |
| Diploma in Records and Archives Management | 2 Years |
| Diploma in Agricultural & Rural Innovation | 2 Years |
| Higher Education Certificate | 1 Year |

=== Faculty of Business Administration and Management Science ===
| Bachelor of Bachelor of Business Administration | 3 Years |
| Bachelor of Science in Marketing | 3 Years |
| Bachelor of Commerce | 3 Years |
| Bachelor of Banking and Finance | 3 Years |
| Bachelor of Accounting and Finance | 3 Years |
| Bachelor of Procurement and Logistics Management | 3 Years |
| Bachelor of Human Resource Management | 3 Years |
| Diploma inHuman Resource Management | 2 Years |
| Bachelor of Procurement and Logistics Management | |
| Bachelor of Tourism and Hotel Management | |
| Bachelor of Science in Accounting and Finance | |

=== Post Graduate Programs ===
| Master of Business Administration | 2 Years |
| Master of Science in Information Technology | 2 Years |
| Master of Education | 2 Years |
| Master of Public Administration | 2 Years |

=== Recent developments ===
MIU held its inaugural graduation in on 21 February 2019 in Kisoro Municipality and has since had one more graduation ceremony.

== See also ==
- List of Universities in Uganda
- Education in Uganda
