= Nexus International University =

Private university in Uganda

Nexus International University (NIU)
- Type: Private
- Established: 1 January 2012; 14 years ago
- Vice-Chancellor: Professor Magnus Amajirionwu
- Location: Nakaziba Road, Ttamu, Mityana, Uganda; 0°22′56.99″N 32°6′9.65″E
- Campus: Urban
- Website: Homepage
- Location within Uganda

Nexus International University (NIU), formerly Virtual University of Uganda (VUU) is a private university in Uganda. The institution is accredited and supervised by the Uganda National Council for Higher Education (UNCHE).

== Location ==
NIU maintains its campus at Nakaziba Road, in Ttamu, a suburb in Ttamu Division, approximately 6 kilometres (4 mi), west of the city of Kampala, Uganda's capital. The geographical coordinates of the university campus are:0°22'56.99"N, 32°6'9.65"E (Latitude:0.38222; Longitude:32.10268).

== History ==
The university was established in 2011. It is the first higher education institution in Uganda to teach its syllabus entirely online. The university adopted the name Virtual University of Uganda (VUU), from 2011 until 2019. VUU admitted its first cohort of students in January 2012.

== Academic courses ==
NIU offers the following academic courses, as of August 2023.

National Certificates and Diploma programmes/ Courses under UBTEB in

- Accounting and Finance
- Business Administration
- Public Administration
- Social Work and Social Administration
- Secretarial Studies
- Computing and Information Systems
- Computer Science
- Computer Science
- Hotel and Institutional Catering
- Procurement and Logistics
- Customs Clearing and Forwarding
- Records and Information Management
- Fashion and Design
- Hair Dressing
- Journalism and Mass Communication
- Human Resource Management

Bachelor/ Degree Programmes/Courses

- Bachelor in Business Administration
- Bachelor in Accounting and Finance
- Bachelor of Information Technology
- Bachelor of Science in Computer Science
- Bachelor of Education (Science and Arts)
- Bachelor of Journalism and Mass Communication
- Bachelor of Social Work and Social Administration
- Bachelor in Public Administration
- Bachelor in Public Health
- Bachelor in Development Studies
- Bachelor in International Relations
- Bachelor in International Development

Postgraduate Diploma Programmes

- Postgraduate Diploma in Education
- Postgraduate Diploma in Public Health
- Postgraduate Diploma in Cyber Security
- Postgraduate Diploma in Data Analytics
- Postgraduate Diploma in Information Systems and Technology
- Postgraduate Diploma in Human Resource Management
- Postgraduate Diploma in Project Planning and Management
- Postgraduate Diploma in Digital Marketing
- Postgraduate Diploma in Supply Chain Management
- Postgraduate Diploma in Environmental Management
- Postgraduate Diploma in Business Administration and Management
- Postgraduate Diploma in Monitoring, Evaluation and Learning
- Postgraduate Diploma in International Development
- Postgraduate Diploma Business Administration
- Postgraduate Diploma ICTs for Development

Master Programmes

- Master of Public Health
- Master in all Computing Courses/Programmes
- Master in Education with all the specializations
- Master in Environmental Courses
- Master of Arts in International Development
- Master of Science in Information and communications technology for Development
- Master of Business Administration
- Executive MBA
- MBA
- Master in Environmental Management
- MBA in Woman in Finance
- MBA in Tourism and Hospitality Management
- Master of Science in Cyber Security
- Master of Information Systems and Technology
- Master in International Development
- Master in Climate Change and Sustainability
- MBA in Oil and Gas Management

In 2023, Nexus International University managed to get its own home in Mityana after all those years of renting in Kampala, now NIU's main Campus is located in Ttamu, Mityana Municipality, Plot 533, Block 124, Nakaziba Road, Ttamu Division. While in Mityana, they introduced new programmes/Courses ranging from National Certificates, National Diploma, and more new degree programmes like 1. Bachelor in Information Technology under computing, 2.Social Work and Social Administration, 3.Public Administration, 4. Education (Science & Arts), 5.Journalism and Mass Communication, 6.Early Childhood Development. All these programmes apart from National Certificates and National Diplomas are offered both Online and physical.

In 2020, new courses introduced, after the university had re-branded, include: 1. An MBA in Oil and Gas 2. MBA in Environmental Management 3. MBA in International Development 4. MBA in Tourism and Hospitality Management and 5. MBA Women in Finance.

Postgraduate Diploma courses last 24 months. Master's degree courses last thirty months. In addition, the university offers in excess of 70 short courses, lasting a few weeks to a few months. The short courses are listed at the university website, referenced here.

== See also ==
- Education in Uganda
- List of universities in Uganda
- List of university leaders in Uganda
