= Bettinah Tianah =

Ugandan actress, model (born 1993)

- Born: Betty Nassali; 10 November 1993 (age 32); Uganda
- Education: St. Mary’s College Kitende
- Alma mater: Makerere University Business School; Cavendish University Uganda
- Occupations: TV Presenter, actress and fashion model

Bettinah Tianah (born Betty Nassali; 10 November 1993) is a Ugandan television personality, actress, model, and fashionista. She is known for hosting television programs like Youth Voice, Be My Date, and The Style Project. She also played a lead role (Rhona) in The Hostel television series.

== Career ==
At the age of 15, Tianah started working at NBS Television as the host of Youth Voice. She later hosted a matchmaking television show called Be My Date in 2015 on NTV Uganda, replacing Anita Fabiola, and has hosted a fashion show called The Style Project from 2017 to March 2022 when she resigned to concentrate on her own business BT Beauty Uganda. Tianah landed her first acting role as Rhona, a "bad girl" on the Ugandan television series The Hostel in its fourth and last season.

Tianah hosted the red carpet event at the Ugandan North American Association (UNAA) Convention in Washington D.C., becoming the first Ugandan to host the event. She is also a model, having signed with Creative Industries Group in 2017. She held her first photoshoot in Paris.

She later opened up her own company known as BT Beauty Uganda

== Personal life ==
Tianah holds a degree in journalism from Cavendish University. She had earlier enrolled for a degree in Human Resources Management at Makerere University Business School (MUBS), but dropped out to pursue a journalism career.
