= Cavendish University Uganda =

Private university in Uganda

- Motto: Latin: Educare Mundum
- Motto in English: "Educate the World"
- Type: Private
- Established: 2008; 18 years ago
- Chancellor: H.E.Goodluck Ebele Jonathan
- Vice-Chancellor: Olive Sabiiti
- Students: 5,000+ (2024)
- Location: Kampala, Uganda; 00°18′04″N 32°35′36″E
- Campus: Urban
- Website: www.cavendish.ac.ug
- Location in Kampala

Cavendish University Uganda (CUU) is licensed and accredited by the Uganda National Council for Higher Education (UNCHE), and was established in 2008. It is ranked 20th best university in Uganda and 10593th in the world.

== Location ==
CUU's main campus is located at 1469 Ggaba Road, in Nsambya, a southern neighborhood of Kampala, the capital and largest city of Uganda. Nsambya is approximately 5 kilometres (3.1 mi), by road, south-east of the central business district of Kampala.

In August 2016, the university established a second campus in the Bukoto neighborhood, to accommodate the law faculty.

== Overview ==
Cavendish University Uganda (CUU) is a higher institution of learning that was granted a letter of interim authority on 18 December 2007 to establish a private university under the Universities and Tertiary Institutions Act No. 7 of 2001.

CUU is fully licensed and accredited by the Uganda National Council for Higher Education (UNCHE), and was established in 2008.

The student-centric academic model of CUU deploys global best practices in teaching and learning and is aimed at fulfilling the Mission of CUU which is to transform students into responsible, educated, employable and entrepreneurial citizens.

Cavendish University Uganda offers market-relevant and accredited academic programmes which are hosted in its four Faculties of Law, Science & Technology, Business & Management, and Socio–Economic Sciences. There is also a School of Postgraduate Studies & Research.

Learning at CUU is innovative, student-centric, participatory, active and practical. A technology platform is deployed to support blended learning, projects, case studies, distance learning, and other forms of effective and active learning.

Cavendish University Uganda has a large student population hailing from over 47 different countries. More than 11,000 students have graduated from CUU in many different disciplines at certificate, diploma, bachelor's and master's levels since its inception.

== Notable alumni ==
=== Political figures and government employees ===
- Persis Namuganza, Ugandan politician and the state minister for lands in the Cabinet of Uganda.
- Robert Kyagulanyi, Ugandan lawyer, entertainer and politician. President of National Unity Platform political party.

=== Film, television and radio ===
Bettinah Tianah, Ugandan television personality, actress, model, and fashionista.

Health worker

Joan Nanteza, Amref health Africa.

== Courses offered ==
The following programmes are currently offered at CUU:

=== Postgraduate programmes ===
- Master of Business Administration
- Master of Business Administration - Accounting & Finance
- Master of Business Administration - Marketing
- Master of Business Administration - Management
- Master of Business Administration - Entrepreneurship
- Master of Business Administration - Human Resources Management
- Master of Business Administration - Procurement & Supply Chain Management
- Master of Laws (LLM)
- Master of Public Health
- Master of Arts in International Relations & Diplomatic Studies
- Master of Science in Project Management
- Master of Security Studies
- Master of Information Technology

=== Postgraduate diplomas ===
- Postgraduate Diploma in Business Administration (PGD BA)

=== Undergraduate programmes ===
- Bachelor of Business Administration: Generic
- Bachelor of Business Administration- Banking & Finance
- Bachelor of Business Administration- Accounting & Finance
- Bachelor of Business Administration- Procurement & Logistics
- Bachelor of Business Administration- Human Resource Management
- Bachelor of Business Administration - Management
- Bachelor of Arts in International Relations and Diplomatic Studies
- Bachelor of Science in Computer Science
- Bachelor of Information Technology
- Bachelor of Journalism & Communication Studies (Public Relations/Mass Communication)
- Bachelor of Laws
- Bachelor of Public Health
- Bachelor of Science in Environmental Health Science
- Bachelor of Science in Software Engineering
- Bachelors in Economics and Statistics
- Bachelor of Arts in Public Administration and Management
- Bachelor of Mass Communication and Journalism
- Bachelor of Environmental Health Science

=== Diplomas ===
- Diploma in Computer Science
- Diploma in Information Technology
- Diploma of Paralegal Studies

== See also ==
- Makindye Division
- List of universities in Uganda
- Education in Uganda
