= Banda, Uganda =

Banda
- Location in Kampala
- Coordinates: 00°21′14″N 32°37′57″E
- Country: Uganda
- Region: Central Uganda
- District: Kampala District
- Division: Nakawa Division
- Elevation: 4,070 ft (1,240 m)

Banda is a hill that lies in Nakawa Division, within Kampala, the capital of Uganda. Banda also refers to the neighborhoods on the slopes of the hill and between Banda Hill and Kireka, extending all the way to the Kampala-Jinja Highway. The southwestern slopes of the hill are occupied by the neighbourhood known as Kyambogo, and is the location of the campus of Kyambogo University, one of the nine public universities in the country.

== Location ==
Banda is bordered by Kiwaatule to the north, Kireka to the east, Kinnawattaka to the southeast, Mbuya to the south, Nakawa to the southwest, Ntinda to the west and northwest. The location of the hill is approximately 11 kilometres (6.8 mi), by road, east of Kampala's central business district. The coordinates of Banda Hill are:0°21'14.0"N, 32°37'57.0"E (Latitude:0.353889; Longitude:32.632500).

== History ==
The full name of Banda is Bandabalogo. Prior to the arrival of the Europeans, Kabaka Muteesa I Mukaabya Walugembe Kayiira, the 30th Kabaka of the Kingdom of Buganda, who reigned from 1856 until 1884, maintained a palace on the hill. It was at this palace that British explorer John Hanning Speke met Kabaka Walugembe Muteesa I in 1862. Muteesa detained Speke for some months before finally releasing him in his quest to look for the source of the Nile River. At Banda, Muteesa faced many misfortunes, which he attributed to ill luck or witch-craft, thus the name Bandabalogo ("Wizards of Banda"). From the 1862 visit of John Speke to Kabaka Muteesa1 death in 1884 the kibuga (capital)/palace relocated Five times as follows from Banda to Nakawa hill then onto Lubaga hill then briefly at Namirembe hill and finally to Kasubi hill were in 1884 Muteesa 1 died. Kasubi hill that was initially called Nabulagala but Kabaka Muteesa 1 renamed it Kasubi, after his mother's village in Kyaggwe County, which hosts Mukono District. Today, the great, great grandson of Muteesa I, Muwenda Mutebi II of the reigning Buganda monarch, maintains a palace at the summit of this hill with the entrance facing west, as is the tradition.

Starting in 1958, the government of Uganda began establishing educational institutions on the southern and southwestern slopes of the hill, in the neighborhood known as Kyambogo. The institutions were merged in 2001 to form Kyambogo University, the third public university established in the country.

== Overview ==
At the top of the hill is a military detach. Banda is also the location of Nabisunsa Girls’ School, a public residential all-girl high school, located north and east of the university. Kyambogo College School, a mixed, public non-residential secondary school is also located on the hill. On the higher reaches of the hill are located upscale residential homes. On the lower reaches of the hill, there are shops, small-scale industries, a stone quarry, warehouses and low-income rental residencies. The Somali entrepreneur Amina Moghe Hersi owns Kingstone Enterprises Limited, a cement distributorship, whose headquarters are located in Banda.

== Points of interest ==
The following points of interest lie on Banda Hill or close to it:

- Kyambogo University - One of the nine public universities in Uganda
- Kyambogo College School - A mixed, non-residential public secondary school
- Nabisunsa Girls Secondary School - An all-girl residential secondary school
- The Banda Palace of Kabaka Ronald Muwenda Mutebi II
- A military detach of the Uganda People's Defense Force, a unit of the Special Forces Group (SFG), offers personal security to the Kabaka of Buganda.
- The headquarters of Kingstone Enterprises Limited, a cement distributorship; one of the companies of Amina Moghe Hersi.
- Reach Out Mbuya Parish HIV/AIDS Initiative - A branch of reach Out Mbuya that offers care and support to HIV/AIDS people in the urban areas.

== See also ==
- Kira Town
- Kireka
- Amina Moghe Hersi
- Kampala Capital City Authority
