= African Bible University (Uganda) =

Private Christian university in Uganda

- Type: Private
- Established: 2005
- Vice-Chancellor: Dr. O. Palmer Robertson
- Location: Lubowa, Wakiso District, Uganda; 00°14′29″N 32°33′54″E
- Campus: Peri-Urban
- Founder: JW Chinchen
- Website: www.abu.ac.ug
- Location in Uganda African Bible University (Uganda) (Africa)

African Bible University (Uganda), is a private Christian university in Uganda founded and owned by African Bible Colleges.

== Location ==
The campus of African Bible University in Uganda sits on 30 acres (0.12 km^{2}) on Lubowa Hill, approximately 12 kilometres (7.5 mi), by road, south of Kampala, Uganda's capital and largest city. The location is about 2 kilometres (1.2 mi) east of the Kampala-Entebbe Road. The coordinates of the university campus are:0°14'26.0"N, 32°33'53.0"E (Latitude:0.240556; Longitude:32.564722).

== Overview ==
African Bible University (Uganda) was founded in 2005 by African Bible Colleges to "offer quality education from a Christian perspective to the surrounding countries of Sudan, South Sudan, Central African Republic, Democratic Republic of the Congo, Rwanda, Burundi, Tanzania, Kenya and Ethiopia". The university spreads across 30 acres (12 ha), on a hilltop that overlooks Lake Victoria.

The university is the third tertiary education Christian institution established in Africa over the past several decades. The first African Bible College was established in Liberia, West Africa in 1975. The second Bible college on the African continent was established in Malawi, Central Africa in 1991. All three institutions are recognized by the governments of their respective countries as accredited, university-level, degree-granting institutions.

== Academic affairs ==
The college offers a four-year program which is designed to award its graduates a Bachelor of Arts degree in biblical studies, which is paired with a minor in business, communications, or Christian education.

== See also ==
- African Bible Universities
- Education in Uganda
- List of universities in Uganda
- Lubowa
