= Kansanga =

Neighborhood in Kampala

- Map of Kampala showing the location of Kansanga.
- Coordinates: 00°17′14″N 32°36′28″E
- Country: Uganda
- Region: Central Region
- District: Kampala Capital City Authority
- Division: Makindye Division
- Time zone: UTC+3 (EAT)
- Website: http://kansanga.com

Kansanga is a neighborhood in Kampala, the capital and largest city of Uganda.

== Location ==
Kansanga is bordered by Kabalagala and Kisugu to the north, Muyenga to the north-east, Kiwafu to the east, Bbunga to the south-east, Konge to the south, Lukuli to the south-west, Kibuye to the west, and Nsambya to the north-west. The road distance between Kampala's central business district and Kansanga is approximately 7 kilometres (4 mi). The coordinates of Kansanga are 0°17'14.0"N, 32°36'28.0"E (Latitude:0.287225; Longitude:32.607778).

== Overview ==
During the 1950s and 1960s, Kansanga was primarily a middle-class residential neighborhood. During the 1990s, the neighborhood transformed into an upscale residential area and began to accommodate corporate entities like Kampala International University and the International University of East Africa. The area is cosmopolitan, with Internet cafes, residential apartments, upscale residential estates, and, as one proceeds north along the Ggaba Road, Kansanga merges into Kabalagala, with its restaurants, bars, and nightclubs.

== Education ==
Kansanga is home to the main campus of Kampala International University, a private university, Rainbow International School, and the main campus of International University of East Africa, another private university.

== See also ==
- Ggaba
- Muyenga
- Makindye Division
