= Jamila Mayanja =

Ugandan entrepreneur and educator (born 1988)

- Born: Kampala, Uganda
- Citizenship: Uganda
- Education: Makerere University (Bachelor of Business Administration )
- Occupation: Entrepreneur

Jamila Mayanja (born 1988) is an Ugandan entrepreneur and educator.

== Early life ==
Jamila Mayanja was born in 1988 in Konge, Buziga in a family of 14 children. She studied from Kitante Primary school, sat for her O-level and A-level in 2004 and 2006 respectively from Nabisunsa Girls school. Jamila holds a bachelor's degree in Business Administration/Marketing from Makerere University.

== Achievements ==
Mayanja participated in the Young African Leaders Initiative [YALI] in the United States in August 2015. She was nominated for the young Achiever's awards under the category of Social Entrepreneurship.

== Professional life ==
Jamila Mayanja has a number of years' experience working with profit making companies and Social ventures. As she was taking her bachelor degree at MUBS she was hired to join the marketing team of one of the top SMS companies in Uganda where she gained her experience as a professional marketer.

In 2012 she resigned from her job and started Smart Girls Uganda, a social enterprise that empowers and supports girls and women through trainings to build their life and economical skills. Smart Girls Uganda has women empowerment programs like the Girls with tools skilling program where they train young women in male dominated non-traditional STEM skills like electrical and mechanical engineering. To date they have trained 300 girls, helping place 120 in workshops and launched 10 businesses.

She innovated a solar recycled Smart Bag that is a comprehensive menstrual hygiene kit/back packer with educational programming designed with and for girls in Uganda made out of upcycled plastic material to make the bag water proof and a solar panel sewed onto the bag that charges a detachable light bulb that gives light to the girls after dark to read their books. To date they have distributed more than 30,000 bags to young girls in rural Uganda.

Jamila is 2015 Mandela Washington Fellowship for Young African leaders Initiative Alumni, 2021 Duke- UNICEF social innovations fellow, 2022 One young world Ambassador, Award winner Education category 2022 TIAW World of Difference Awards. Jamila is now also a human centered design Coach with Aga Khan foundation schools 2030 program and Awa 2nd winner in the innovations category.

== Personal life ==
Mayanja is a mother of one.
