= Lubowa =

- Map of Uganda showing the location of Lubowa.
- Coordinates: 00°13′39″N 32°33′18″E
- Country: Uganda
- Region: Central
- District: Wakiso District
- Elevation: 1,300 m (4,300 ft)
- Time zone: UTC+3 (EAT)

Lubowa is a neighborhood in Wakiso District of the Central Region of Uganda. It is a suburb of Kampala, the capital of Uganda and the largest city in that country.

== Location ==
Lubowa is bordered by Kabowa to the north, Najjanankumbi and Makindye to the northeast, Munyonyo to the east, Kaazi to the southeast, Kajjansi to the south, Nakigalala to the west, and Buddo to the west. It is located approximately 11.5 kilometres (7.1 mi) by road south of the Kampala central business district, on the Kampala-Entebbe Road.

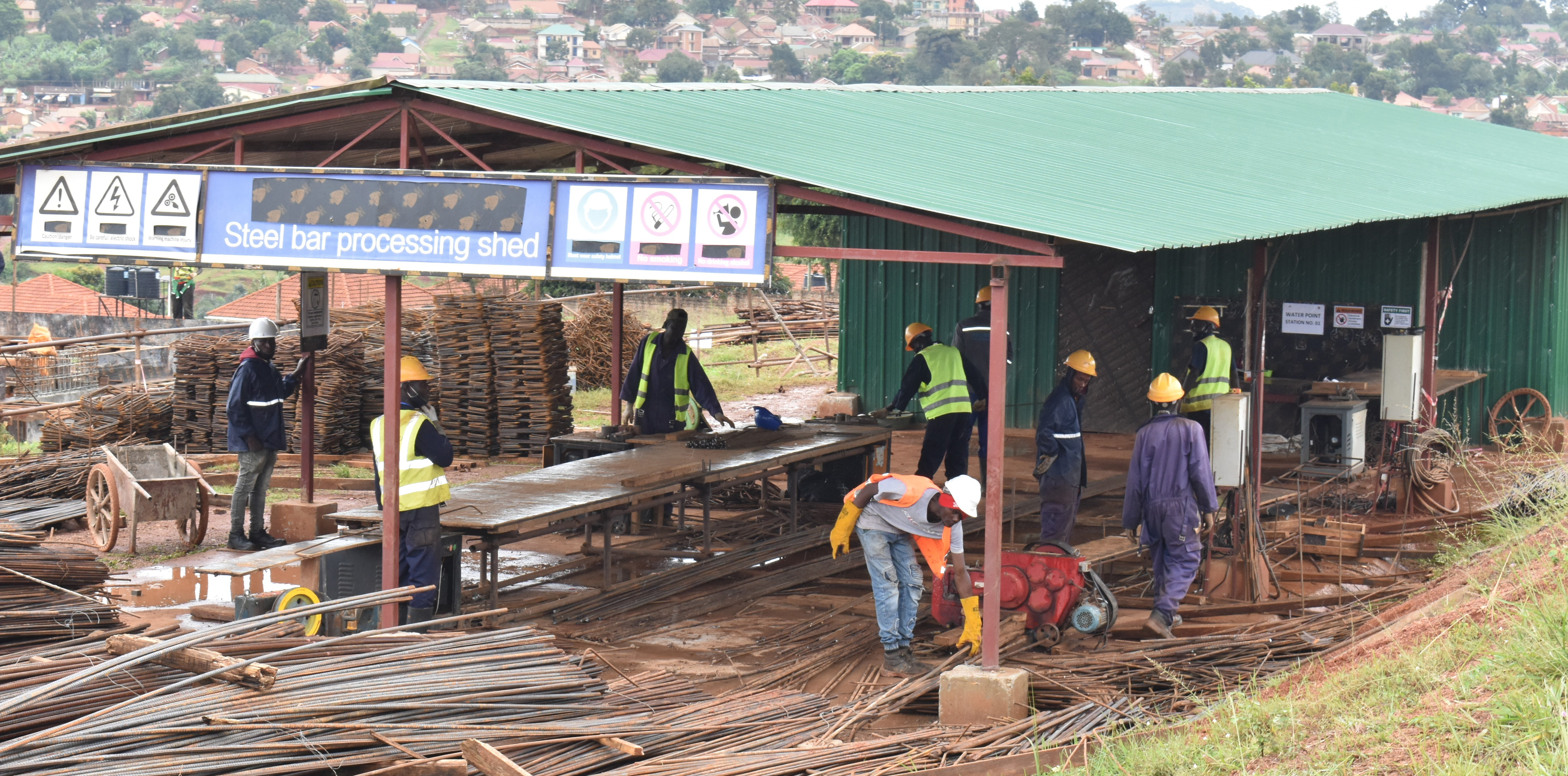
Lubowa Hospital

== Points of interest ==
The following points of interest are located in Lubowa:

- Galaxy International School Uganda (GISU) – The school provides international education to students between 2 and 19 years of age. From kindergarten to year 13 students are taught using student-centred methods. Emphasis is on the development of the whole person. Students in years 10 and 11 are prepared for the International General Certificate of Secondary Education (IGCSE) examination and those in years 12 and 13 are prepared for Cambridge A level examination.
- Roofings Limited – Manufacturer of roofing Materials, with about 1,000 employees.
- International School of Uganda (ISU) – A private high school, catering primarily to the children of diplomats and expatriate staff in Uganda.
- Christian Congregation of Jehovah's Witnesses – The Uganda Branch Office of Jehovah's Witnesses.
- African Bible University (Uganda) – One of the universities in Uganda.
- A campus of International Health Sciences University (IHSU), a private university in Uganda.
- Uganda International Specialized Hospital (In development).

== See also ==
- Makindye
- Kajjansi
- Buddo Hill
