= Bugolobi =

Location in Kampala, Uganda

- Map of Kampala showing the location of Bugolobi.
- Coordinates: 00°18′36″N 32°37′30″E
- Country: Uganda
- Region: Central Uganda
- District: Kampala Capital City Authority
- Division: Nakawa Division
- Elevation: 1,180 m (3,870 ft)
- Time zone: UTC+3 (EAT)

Bugolobi, sometimes spelled as Bugoloobi, is a location in Kampala, Uganda's capital and largest city. It is a suburban neighborhood and some of the most valuable properties in Kampala are found here. It is among the most developed neighborhoods in Kampala and Uganda in general.

== Location ==
Bugolobi is bordered by Nakawa and Mbuya to the north, Mutungo to the east, Kitintale and Luzira to the southeast, Muyenga to the south and southeast, Namuwongo to the west and Kampala's Industrial Area to the northwest. The road distance between Bugoloobi and the central business district of Kampala is approximately 7 kilometres (4.3 mi). The coordinates of Bugoloobi are:0°18'36.0"N, 32°37'30.0"E (Latitude:0.3100; Longitude:32.6250).

== Overview ==
Bugoloobi is a Kampala neighborhood, situated on Bugoloobi Hill. On the lower reaches of the hill, to the northwest, the neighborhood is contiguous with the city's Industrial Area. However, the commercial real estate in the neighborhood is upscale. On the eastern slopes of the hill is a large apartment complex with lower middle-class tenants. The northern slopes and southern slopes of the hill, as well as the summit are occupied by residential bungalows, with the size of the homes getting larger, as you approach the top of the hill.

== Points of interest ==
The following points of interest are found in Bugolobi:

- Paragon Hospital - A 350-bed, upscale private hospital
- Resurrection Church Bugolobi - A place of worship affiliated with the Pentecostal Movement
- Dolphin Suites - Plunge into Luxury (Accommodation, Restaurant, Gym, Spa, Steam, Sauna, Swimming Pool, Indian & Continental food)
- National Forestry Authority Gardens
- Teddy Bear Kindergarten & Day Care Center
- Royal Suites Bugolobi - A private resort development
- Uganda Vacation Rental Condos
- A branch of DFCU Bank - One of the twenty-five licensed commercial banks in Uganda
- Village Mall, Bugolobi - An upscale shopping mall, with a supermarket, restaurants, saloons, boutiques and other shops
- Tulifanya Restaurant
- Good African Coffee Factory
- Bugolobi View Villas - An upscale residential neighborhood. In development.
- Uganda Communications Commission Office Complex
- Nakumatt Supermarket - A private supermarket chain with eight outlets in Uganda as of June 2014. - The Anchor Store At Village Mall
- Bougainviller Hotel - A private hotel/motel.
- A local franchise of Kentucky Fried Chicken - Located Inside Village Mall
- 17 A, also called Kagame's a local kafunda for drinks

== See also ==
- Nakawa
- Mbuya
- Namuwongo
- Luzira
- Nakumatt
- UCC
- Kololo
