= African Bible Colleges =

Group of Bible colleges

- Type: Private
- Established: 1976
- Location: Liberia, Malawi, Uganda
- Campus: Peri-Urban
- Founder: Jack and Nell Chinchen
- Website: africanbiblecolleges.net

African Bible Colleges is an entity comprising multiple Bible college in Africa. The three campuses offer university-level education with the aim of training men and women for Christian leadership and service. The colleges are in Liberia, Malawi and Uganda.

== History ==
African Bible Colleges was founded in 1976 with the first campus being opened in 1978 in Liberia in West Africa. In 1991 the second college opened in Malawi in Central Africa, and in 2005 a third campus opened in Uganda. Prior to the First Liberian Civil War, ABC operated as a full college and conferred BA degrees after its accreditation in 1983 by the Ministry of Education, but was forced to close because of the war that began in Nimba County, where the college is situated. The college re-opened in 2008.

== Programs ==
The four-year curriculum is designed to be either terminal or preparatory for further education.

== Sports involvement ==
African Bible College in Malawi regularly hosts basketball and other sporting events at the national level, including the national All Stars Tournament. Their sports teams are called the ABC Lions.

== See also ==
- African Bible College (Uganda)
