= University of Kisubi =

Private university in Uganda

University of Kisubi (UniK)
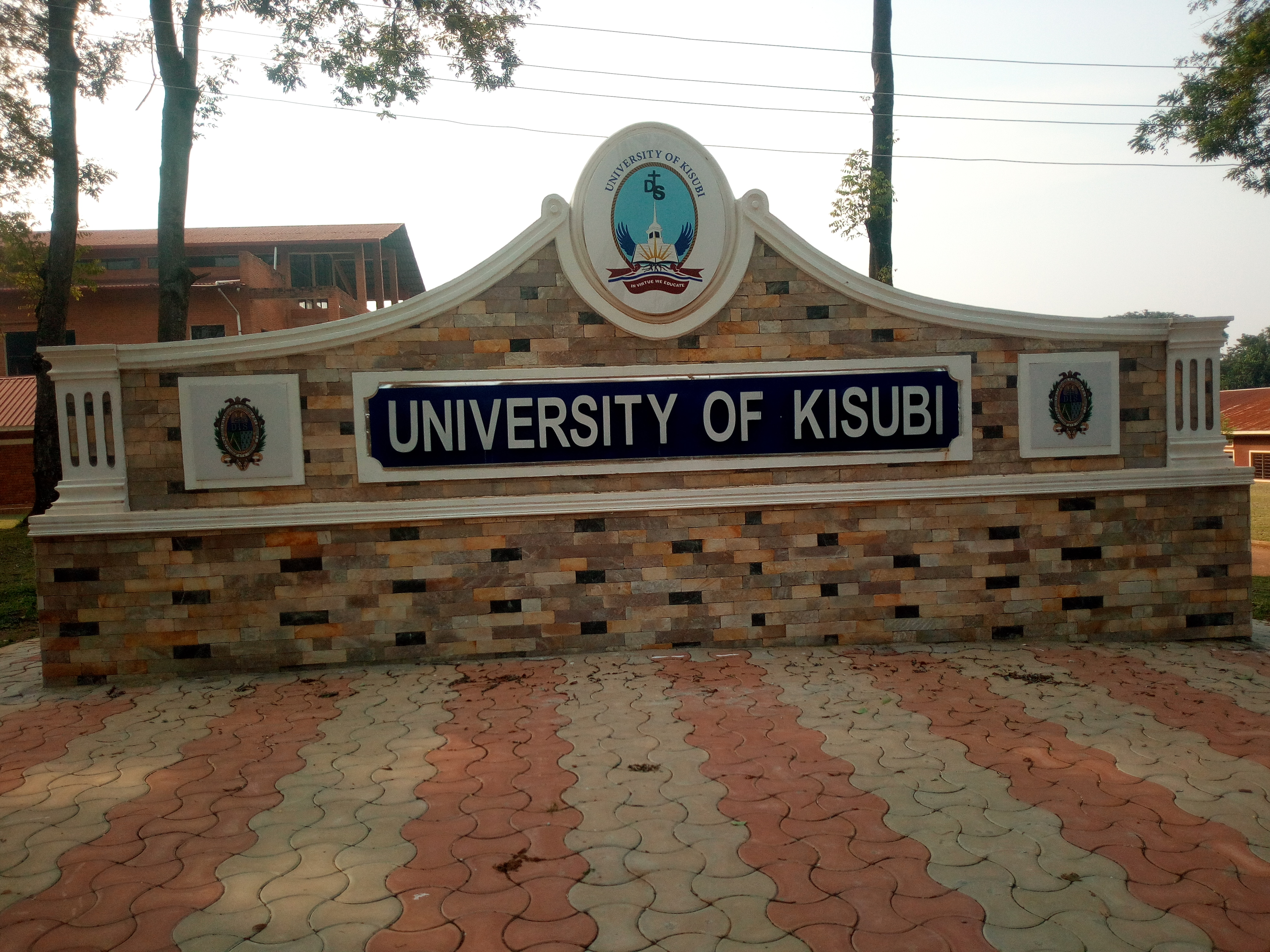
- Type: Private University
- Established: 2004
- Chancellor: Rev. Bro. Peter Kazzekulya
- Vice-Chancellor: Bro. Deogratious Mugema
- Location: Kisubi, Wakiso District, Uganda; 00°07′14″N 32°31′54″E
- Campus: Suburban
- Website: Homepage
- Location in Uganda

University of Kisubi (UniK), is a private, co-educational, university in Uganda.

== Location ==
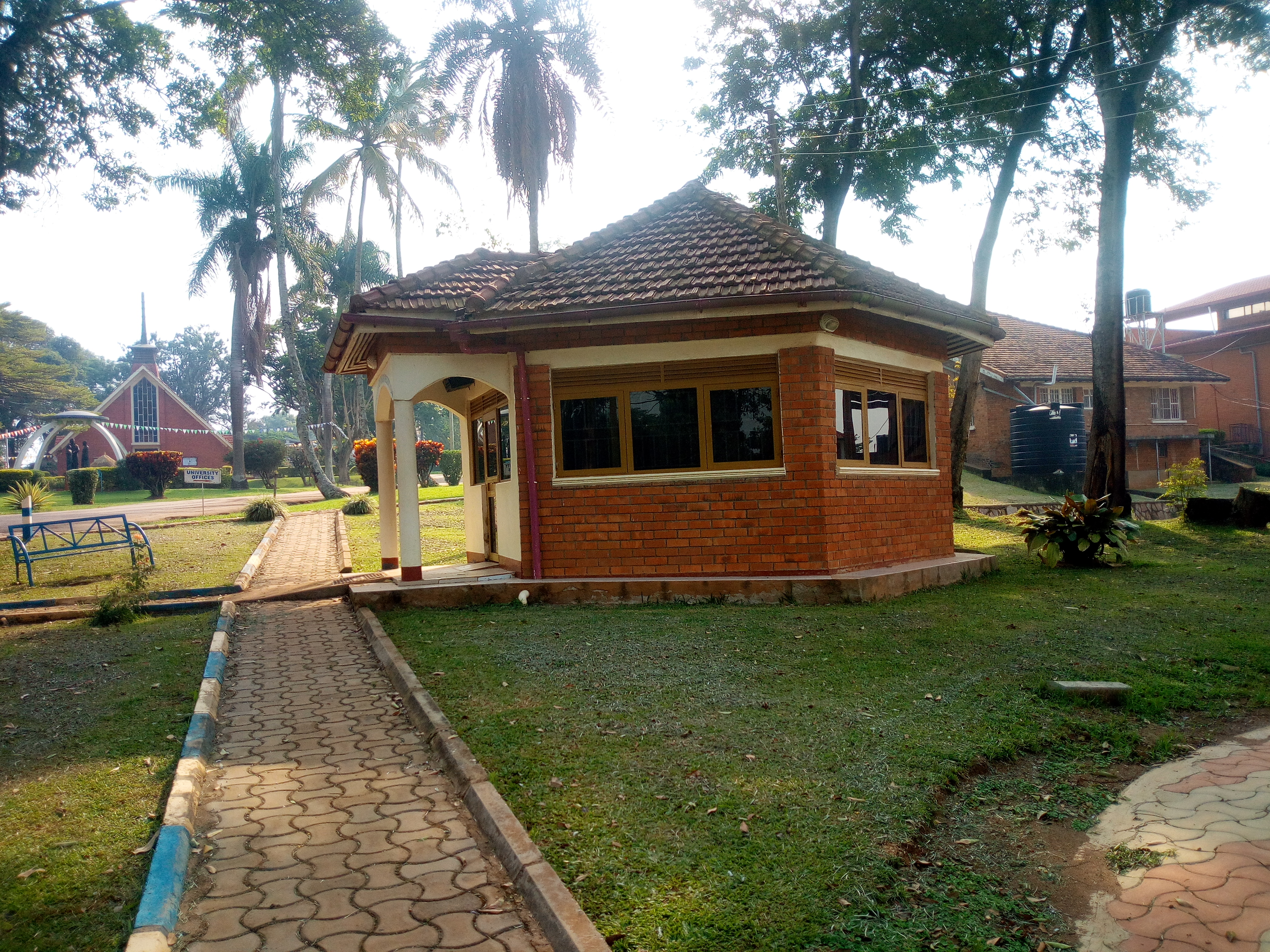
University of Kisubi

The campus of the university is in Kisubi on the Kampala–Entebbe Road, about 18 kilometres (11 mi) North-East of Entebbe International Airport. This is about 35 kilometres (22 mi) south of Kampala, the country's capital and largest city. The coordinates of UniK's campus are 0°07'14.0"N, 32°31'54.0"E (Latitude:0.120567; Longitude:32.531677).

== History ==
University of Kisubi was established in 2004 by the Brothers of Christian Instruction, as a center of Uganda Martyrs University. In 2009 UniK was made a constituent college of the university. In 2015, it received provisional accreditation to become an independent University. The university held its third graduation ceremony in October 2018.

== Faculties ==
The university had three faculties as of April 2016:

1. Faculty of Business and Information Communication Technology
2. Faculty of Education
3. Faculty of Human and Social Sciences
4. Faculty of Health Sciences

== Academic courses ==
As of April 2016, UniK offers the following academic courses:

=== Postgraduate ===
- Master of Arts in Educational Leadership
- Master of Business Administration
- Master of Science in Clinical & Psychological Counseling
- Master of Information Technology

=== Undergraduate ===
- Bachelor of Arts with Education
- Bachelor of Science with Education
- Bachelor of Business Studies with Education
- Bachelor of Business Administration & Management
- Bachelor of Science in Information Technology
- Bachelor of Counseling Psychology
- Bachelor of Science in Rehabilitation Counseling Psychology
- Bachelor of Science in Family and Child Counseling Psychology
- Bachelor of Arts in Human and Religious Studies
- Bachelor of Social Work & Management
- Bachelor of Bio-Medical Laboratory Technology
- Bachelor of Development & Management Studies
- Bachelor of Arts in Economics
- Bachelor of Economics and Statistics
- Bachelor of Arts in Human and Religious Studies
- Bachelor of Art, Fashion and Design
- Bachelor of Public Relations and Mass Communication
- Bachelor of Science in Public Health

=== Diplomas ===
- Diploma in Business Administration
- Diploma in Information Technology
- Diploma in Counseling Psychology
- Diploma in Bio Medical Laboratory Technology
- Diploma in Business Management
- Diploma in Public Health
- Diploma in Social Work and Social Administration

== Certificates ==
- Certificate in Business Administration
- Certificate in Information Technology
- Certificate in Counseling
- Certificate in Social Work and Social Administration
- Certificate in Music
- Certificate in Swahili
- Certificate in English Proficiency

== See also ==
- Education in Uganda
- List of universities in Uganda
- Central Region, Uganda
- List of university leaders in Uganda
