= Katwe =

- Map of Kampala showing the location of Katwe.
- Coordinates: 00°17′48″N 32°34′32″E
- Country: Uganda
- Region: Central Uganda
- District: Kampala Capital City Authority
- Division: Makindye Division
- Elevation: 1,190 m (3,900 ft)
- Time zone: UTC+3 (EAT)

Katwe is an area in the city of Kampala, the capital of Uganda.

== Location ==
Katwe, located in Makindye Division, is bordered by Nakasero to the north, Nsambya to the east, Kibuye and Makindye to the southeast, Ndeeba to the south and Mengo to the west. The road distance between Kampala's central business district and Katwe is approximately 3 kilometres (1.9 mi).

== Overview ==
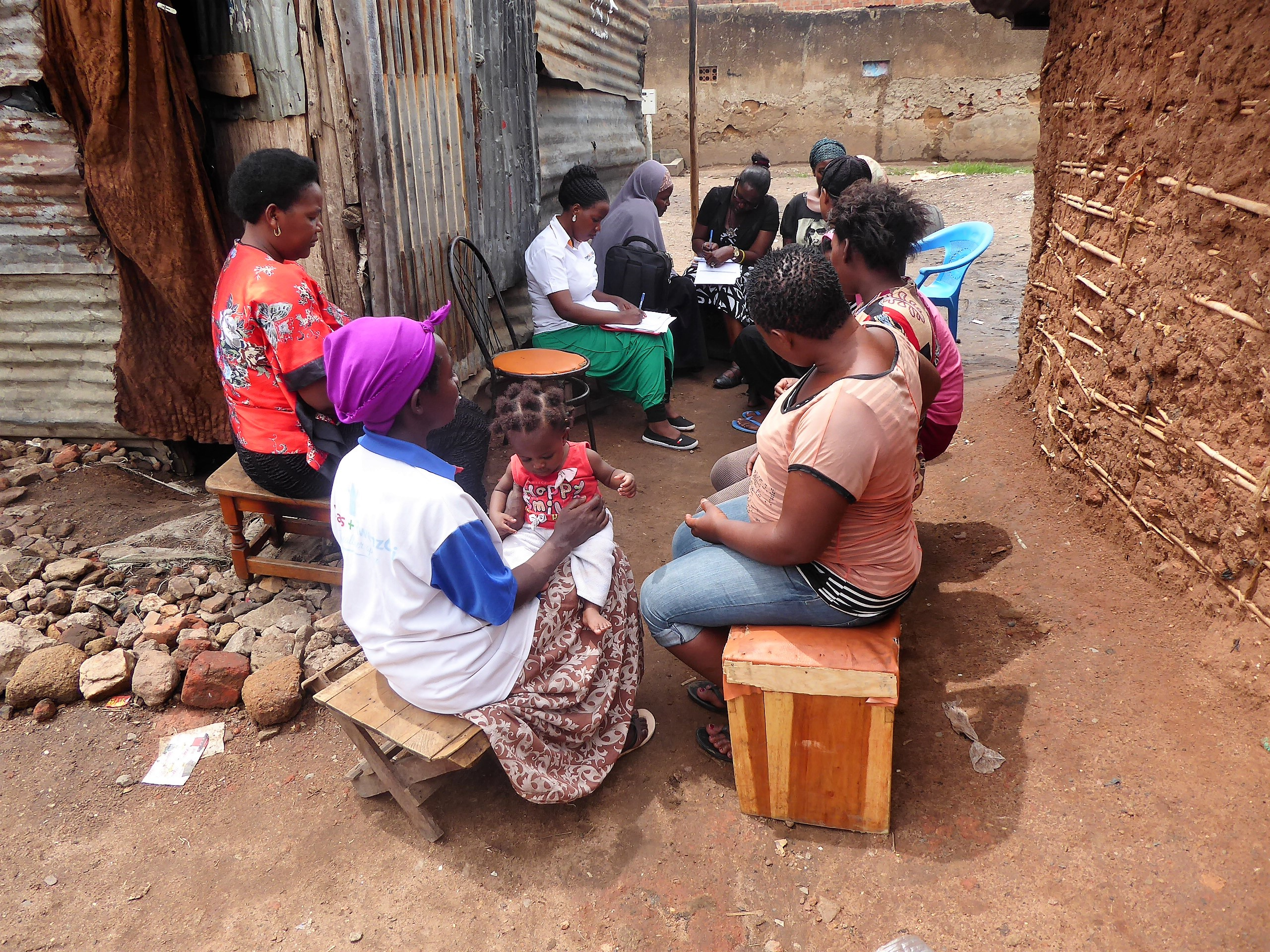
A self-help group in Katwe

At the time of Uganda's Independence from Britain in 1962, Katwe was a center of African ingenuity, where artisans, craftsmen and technicians repaired imported electronics, automobiles, televisions, refrigerators and all kinds of appliances. The more ingenious of these craftsmen would improvise and "manufacture" imitations of the original articles. The Baganda, an ethnic group in Uganda call such improvised articles Magezi ga Baganda (Wisdom of Baganda). Over the next half a century, that ingenuity has sharpened, the industry has thrived and taken in more apprentices and the range of articles locally manufactured has increased. In 2007, it was estimated that Katwe employed over 3,000 artisans and metal fabricators in over 800 individual small enterprises. The Katwe artisans now collaborate with Makerere University's Faculty of Technology, to take their industry to the next level. Another group that has been traditionally attracted to Katwe are entrepreneurs and independent businesspeople, starting from meager beginnings, who have been viewed as "risky" by Uganda's conservative banking industry. These have included cooked food vendors, wholesalers of local foodstuffs, herbalists and owners of small transportation companies. One such an entrepreneur is Namutebi, a herbalist and owner of a transportation company. Despite her lack of formal education and young age (33 years in 2007), her estimated net worth was in the seven-figure range (in US$). Other businesspeople who have come to Katwe include vendors of second-hand electronics, and sellers of scrap goods and previously owned merchandise.

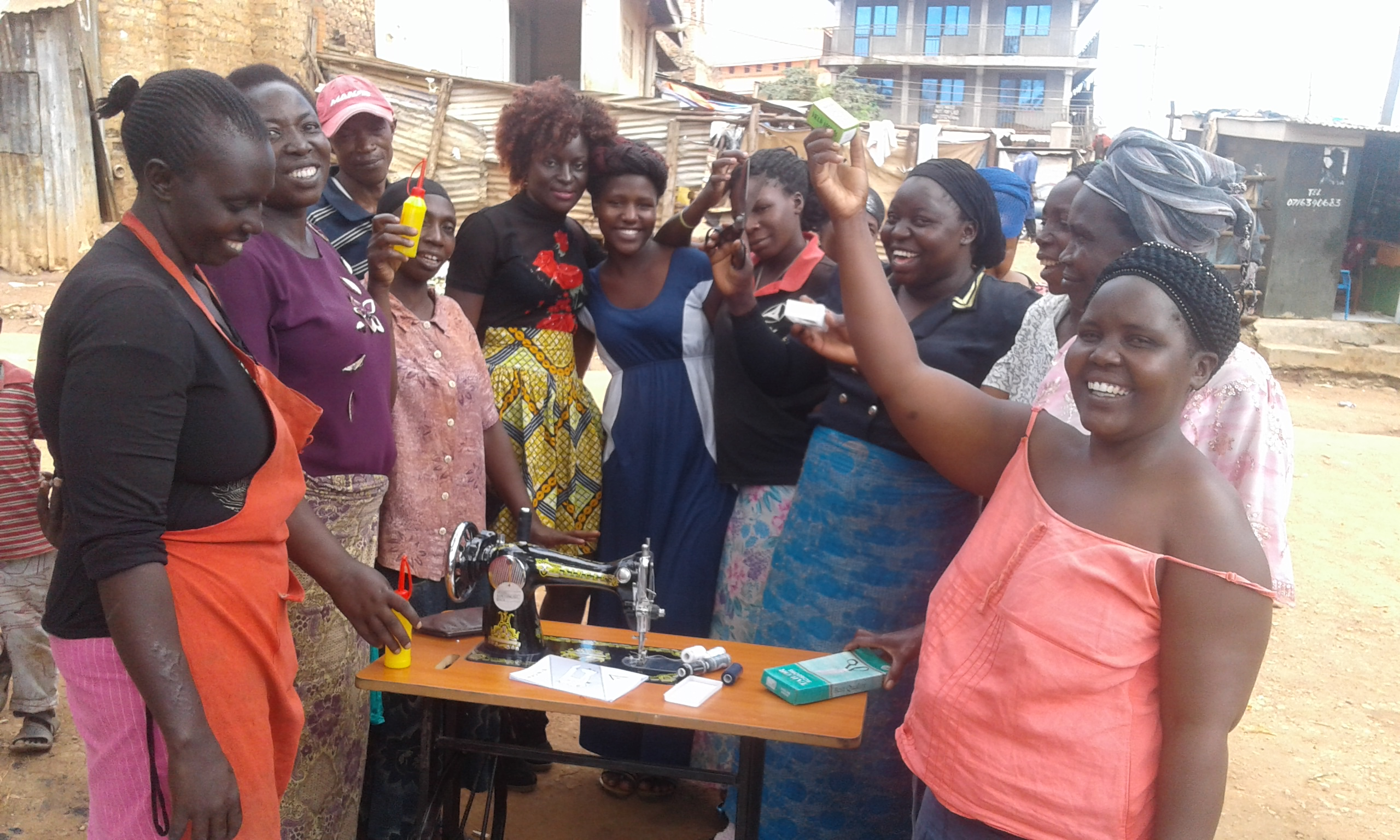
A self-help group using a donated sewing machine, to generate revenue to help neighborhood women in need

Katwe has also attracted young men and women, with little education and practical skills who have resorted to all manner of crime, ranging from prostitution and petty thievery to armed robbery and murder. Katwe remains one of the highest crime-ridden areas in Kampala. Politicians and community leaders have blamed the high crime rate on high unemployment and rampant use of recreational drugs, but lasting solutions to the problem remain elusive.

The residential areas of Katwe have been a slum, right when human habitation started to appear along the railway tracks leading from Kampala to Kasese in the first half of the 20th century. However, starting around 2007, respectable office space started to appear on Katwe's main streets. Quality Chemical Industries Limited, a Ugandan pharmaceutical manufacturer has its head office at Quality Chemicals House, in Katwe. Equity Bank maintains its headquarters in the area, having acquired Uganda Microfinance Limited, which established its headquarters there in August 2007. Subsequently, other reputable businesses, including Orient Bank, Tropical Bank, Stanbic Bank, Bank of Africa and Airtel Telecom, are moving into the area, turning the former slum into a respectable business zone, one building at a time.

== Points of interest ==
The following points of interest lie within or near Katwe:

- Katwe Central Market
- Nakayima's Shrine - A place where a traditional soothsayer interprets problems and predicts the future for a fee.
- Glory Ministries International - A place of worship affiliated with the Pentecostal Movement
- Katwe Martyrs Church - A place of worship affiliated with the Church of Uganda
- Nalongo's Restaurant - A restaurant that serves tradition Ganda food. It has been in the neighborhood since the early 1960s.
- Katwe Primary School - An elementary school administered by the Uganda Ministry of Education
- Uganda Bikers Association Office - Offers motorcycles for rent to members
- Muganzirwazza Shopping Mall - A 5-storey shopping complex housing a supermarket, banks, cafes, pharmacies and hair saloons.

== Cultural references ==
The 2016 movie Queen of Katwe, starring David Oyelowo and Lupita Nyong'o, is set in the area.

== Notable people ==
- Phiona Mutesi, born 1996, Ugandan chess champion, and the subject of a book, documentary and Disney film Queen of Katwe.

== See also ==
- Kampala
- Makindye
- Quality Chemicals
- Makindye Division
- Central Uganda
