= Kyambogo =

- Map of Uganda showing the location of Kyambogo
- Coordinates: 00°20′54″N 32°37′49″E
- Country: Uganda
- District: Kampala District

Government
  - Executive Director: Jennifer Musisi
- Elevation: 1,240 m (4,070 ft)
- Time zone: UTC+3 (EAT)

Kyambogo is a neighborhood in Kampala, Uganda. It is within Nakawa Division, an administrative borough of Kampala, Uganda's capital city.

== Location ==
Kyambogo sits on Banda Hill, which rises to an altitude of 1,240 metres (4,070 ft), above sea level. The neighborhood is bordered by Kiwatule to the north, Banda to the east, Kinnawattaka to the southeast, Mbuya to the south, Nakawa to the southwest, Ntinda to the west and northwest. The location of the neighborhood is approximately 10 kilometres (6.2 mi), by road, east of Kampala's central business district. The coordinates of Kyambogo are:0°20'54.0"N 32°37'49.0"E (Latitude:0.348334; Longitude:32.630275).

== History ==
Little is known about the history of Kyambogo prior to 1958. That year, Uganda Polytechnic Kyambogo (UPK) which had been established on Makerere Hill in 1928, was transferred to Kyambogo. Its role was to train Ugandan technicians and artisans. In 1948, the Institute of Teacher Education Kyambogo (ITEK) was established. Its first home was in Nyakasura, Kabarole District. It was subsequently moved to Mbarara and finally to Kyambogo as well. In 1988, the Uganda National Institute of Special Education (UNISE), originally a department at ITEK, was spun off as a separate institution. In 2003, the three institutions were merged to form Kyambogo University, the third public university to be established in Uganda.

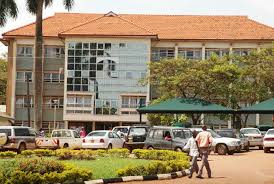
Kyambogo University senate building in Kyambogo

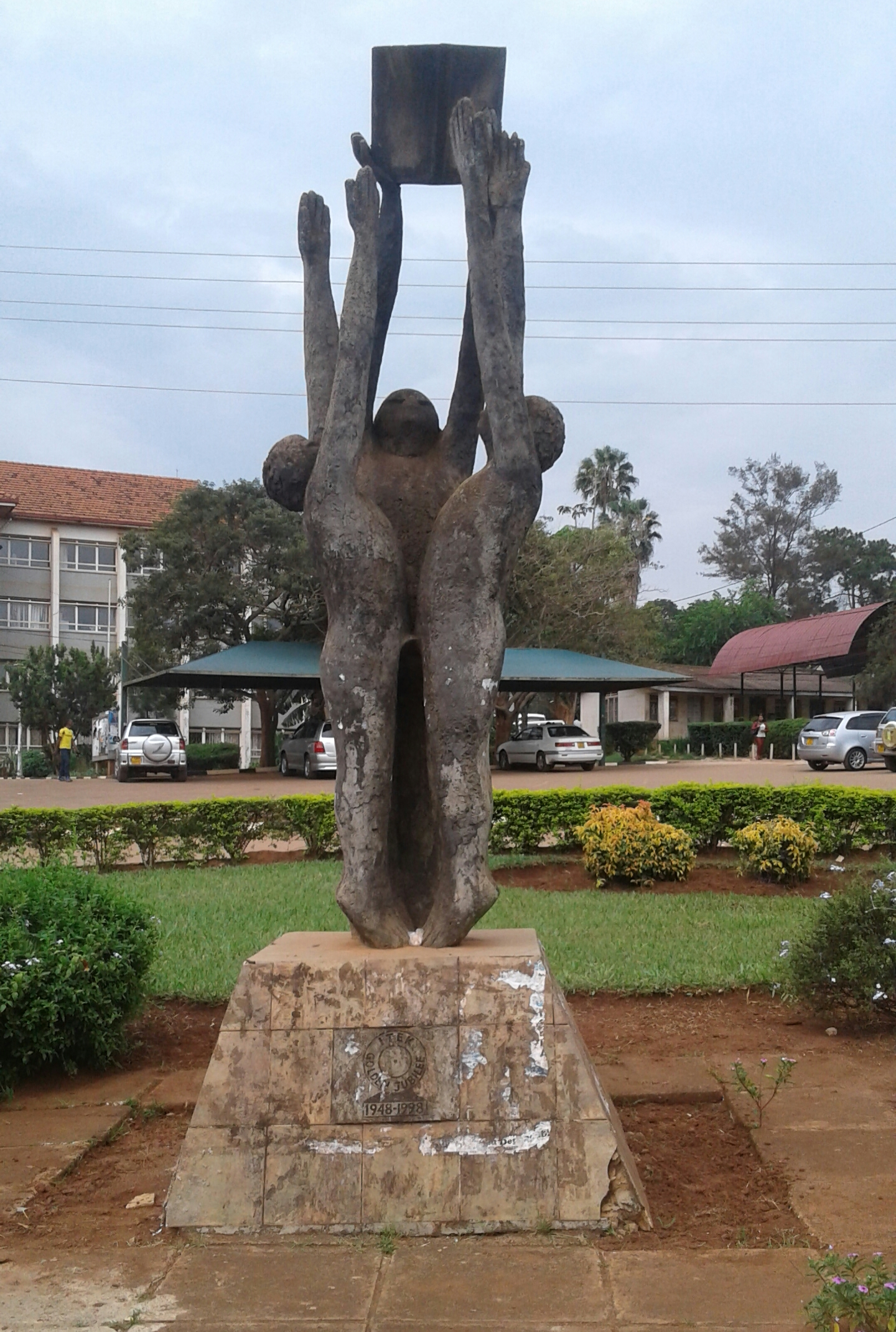
Institute of Teacher Education Kyambogo Golden Jubilee (1948-1998).

== Points of interest ==
The points of interest in Kyambogo, include the following:

- Kyambogo University - One of the seven public universities in Uganda
- East African Polytechnic college kyambogo - A professional Association organisation and registry of vocational professionals
- Kyambogo College School - A mixed, non-residential public secondary school
- Nabisunsa Girls Secondary School - An all-girl residential O-Level and A-Level institution of learning.
- a branch of Dfcu bank
- A branch of Stanbic Bank

== See also ==
- Kyambogo University
- Uganda Universities
- Nakawa Division
- UG Business Schools
- KCCA
- Banda
