= Kabalagala =

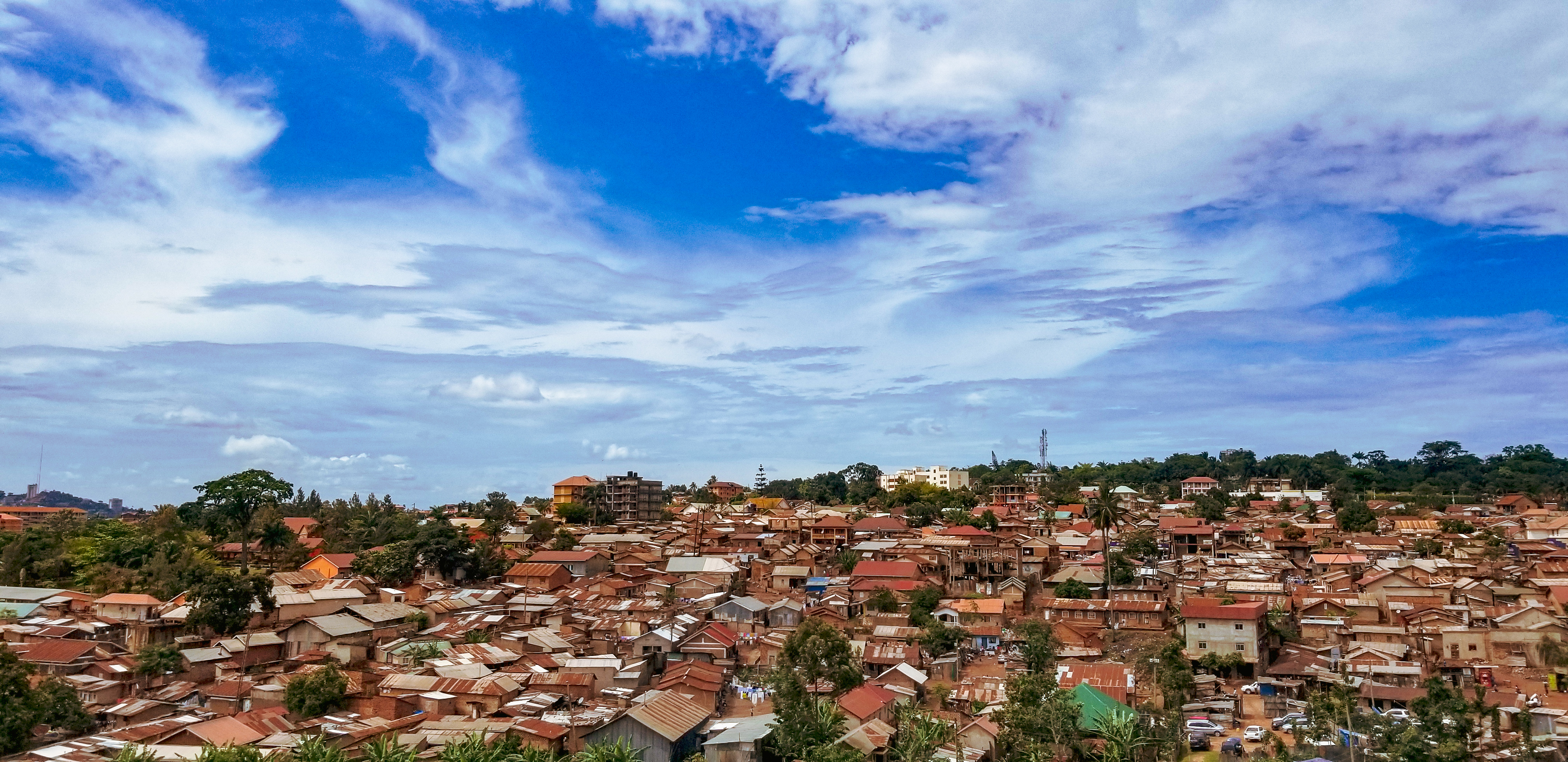

- Location in Kampala
- Coordinates: 00°17′53″N 32°36′02″E
- Country: Uganda
- Region: Central Uganda
- District: Kampala
- Division: Makindye Division
- Elevation: 3,900 ft (1,190 m)

Kabalagala is a neighbourhood in Kampala, the capital and largest city in Uganda. It houses some of the leading partygoers in the city. It is located next to Nsambya where the American Embassy in Uganda is found.

== Location ==
Kabalagala is bordered by Kibuli to the northwest, Namuwongo to the northeast, Muyenga to the east and southeast, Kansanga to the south, Lukuli to the southwest and Nsambya to the west. Kabalagala is located about 6 kilometres (3.7 mi) southeast of Kampala's central business district. The coordinates of the neighborhood are:0° 17' 53.00"N, 32° 36' 2.00"E (Latitude:0.298056; Longitude:32.600556).

== Overview ==
Kabalagala is a fast-growing neighborhood in Kampala, Uganda's capital, and largest city. The neighborhood is famous for its many restaurants, bars and nightclubs. It is a major entertainment center, with many of the establishments open 24 hours, 7 days a week. During the 2000s the neighborhood has become a vibrant business hub, with new commercial banks, supermarkets, fuel stations and a university campus. The American Embassy in Uganda is located in neighboring Nsambya, about 1 kilometre (0.62 mi) west of Kabalagala, along Ggaba Road. The neighborhood is a favorite hangout for foreigners visiting or resident in Uganda.

== History ==
The name Kabalagala is derived from the Luganda name of a pancake made from sweet bananas, cassava flour and is spiced with local peppers. Street vendors of this food delicacy would yell "Kabalagala" to motorists waiting to turn at the junction. The name stuck. Prior to that, the neighborhood was known as "Kisugu". That name is now reserved for the more affluent residential area further north and east of Kabalagala.

== Points of interest ==
The following points of interest lie in Kabalagala, or close to the edges of the neighborhood:

- The confluence of (a) Ggaba Road (b) Nsambya Road and (c) Muyenga Road
- The American Embassy in Uganda lies to the west of the neighborhood in another suburb called Nsambya
- The main campus of Kampala International University lies at the border between Kabalagala and neighboring Kansanga
- The Ethiopian Village, a restaurant, bar and nightclub – one of the locations bombed by Somali terrorists on 11 July 2010.

== See also ==
- Nsambya
- Kibuli
- Muyenga
- Kansanga
- Makindye
- Makindye
- Kampala
- 2010 KLA Bombs
