= Ndeeba =

Neighbourhood in Kampala, Uganda

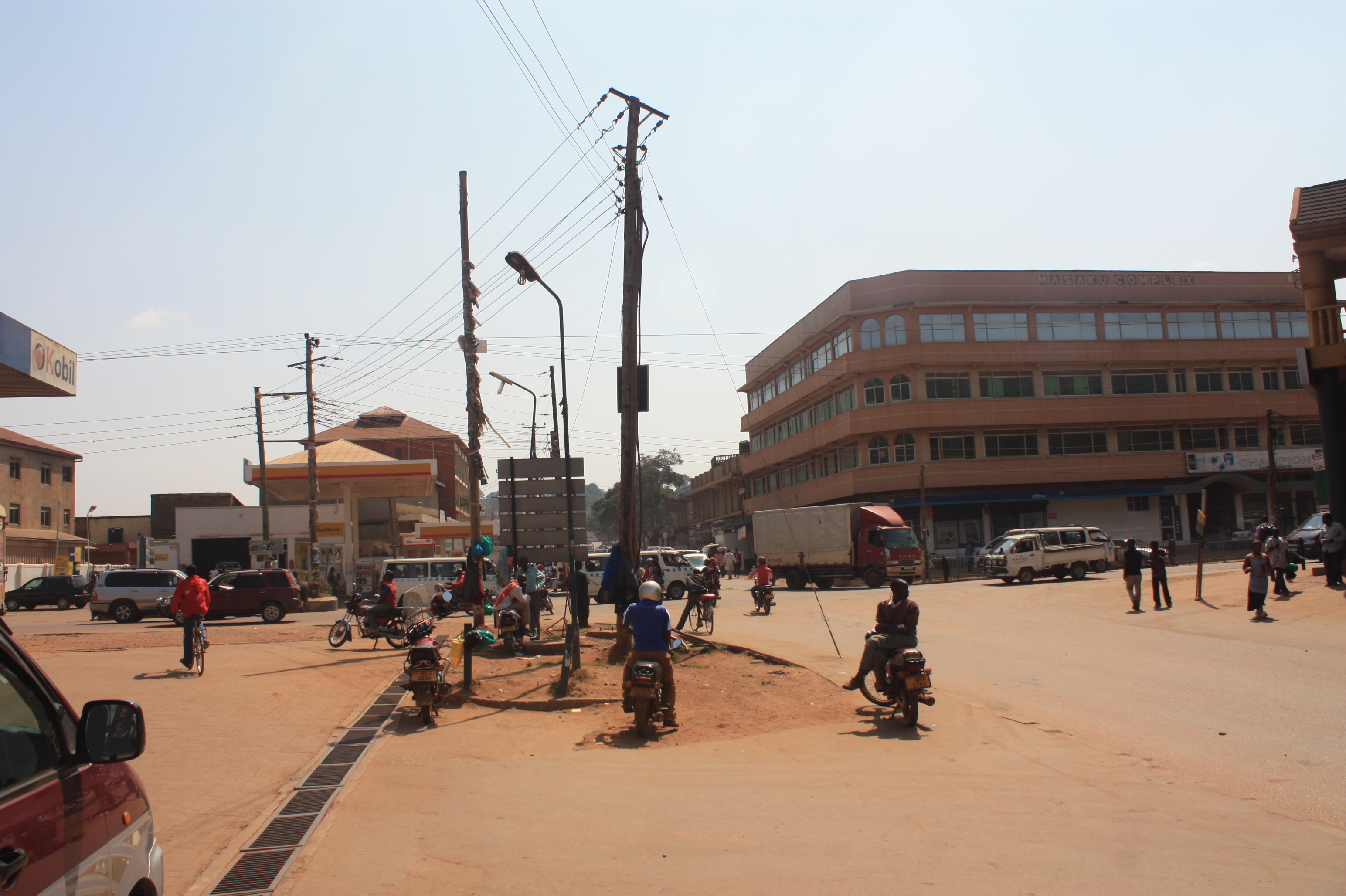
- Ndeeba Junction

- Map of Kampala showing the location of Ndeeba.
- Coordinates: 00°17′24″N 32°33′54″E
- Country: Uganda
- Region: Central Uganda
- District: Kampala Capital City Authority
- Division: Lubaga Division
- Elevation: 1,190 m (3,900 ft)
- Time zone: UTC+3 (EAT)

Ndeeba is a neighborhood in the city of Kampala, Uganda's capital.

== Location ==
Ndeeba is located in Lubaga Division, one of the five administrative divisions of Kampala. It lies on the southern edge of the city. It is bordered by Mengo to the north, Katwe to the northeast, Kibuye to the east, Makindye and Najjanankumbi to the southeast, Kabowa to the south, Mutundwe to the west and Lubaga to the northwest. The road distance between Kampala's central business district and Ndeeba is approximately 5 kilometres (3.1 mi).

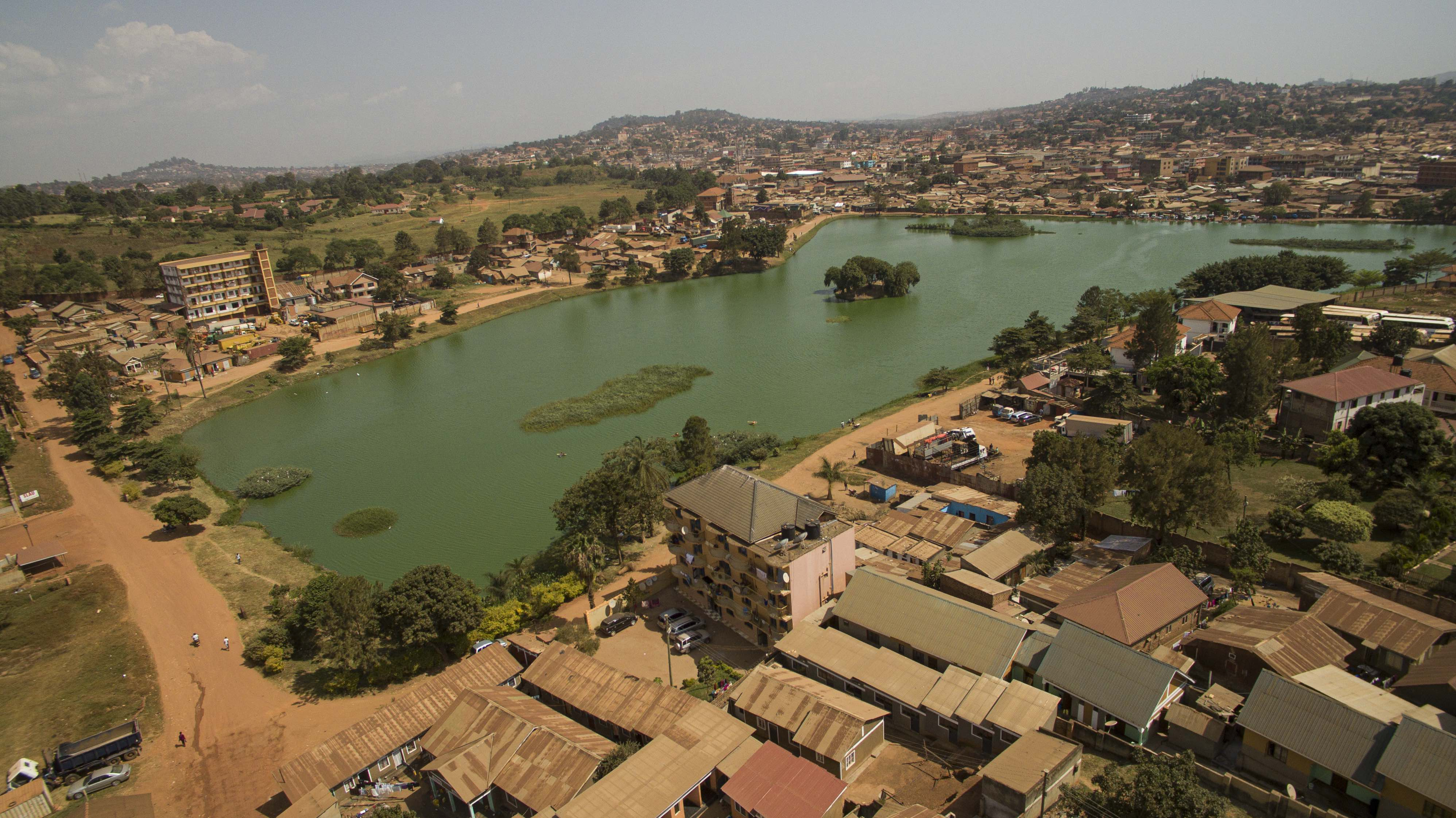
Kabaka's lake in Ndeeba, Uganda

== Overview ==
Ndeeba lies on the main highway (A-109), between Kampala and Masaka. It was a trading center and a lower middle-class residential area in the 1950s and 1960s. Today, Ndeeba has morphed into a busy metropolitan area with businesses, small industries, retail shops and a thriving farmers market. Many of the leading financial houses in Uganda maintain branches in the area due to the booming business in commercial and retail banking in the neighborhood. Behind the thriving business environment along the main road, lies a sprawling slum with all the challenges that come with crowded, poor, urban living.

== Points of interest ==
The following points of interest lie in or near Ndeeba:

- A branch of Bank of Africa
- A branch of ABSA Bank
- A branch of Ecobank
- A branch of Equity Bank (Uganda)
- A branch of DFCU Bank
- A branch of Kenya Commercial Bank
- A branch of PostBank Uganda
- A branch of United Bank for Africa
- Ndeeba Farmers Market

== See also ==
- KCCA
- Lubaga Division
- BMK Group
