= Kisubi =

- Map of Uganda showing the location of Kisubi.
- Coordinates: 00°07′13″N 32°31′58″E
- Country: Uganda
- Region: Central Region of Uganda
- County: Busiro County
- District: Wakiso District
- Elevation: 1,100 m (3,600 ft)
- Time zone: UTC+3 (EAT)

Kisubi is a neighborhood in the Central Region of Uganda.

== Location ==
Kisubi is located in Busiro County, Wakiso District, on Kampala-Entebbe Road, about 17.5 kilometres (11 mi) northeast of Entebbe International Airport. This is approximately 24 kilometres (15 mi) south of Kampala, the country's capital and largest city. The coordinates of Kisubi are:0°07'13.0"N, 32°31'58.0"E (Latitude:0.120272; Longitude:32.532790).

== Points of interest ==
The following additional points of interest lie within the town limits or close to the edges of town:

- St. Mary's College Kisubi
- University of Kisubi, formerly the Kisubi Brothers University College, a constituent college of Uganda Martyrs University
- Kisubi Minor Seminary
- Kisubi Hospital, a private, non-profit, community hospital, owned by the Roman Catholic Archdiocese of Kampala
- St. Donozio Ssebuggwawo Primary School, commonly known as Kisubi Boys, a mixed-sex elementary school
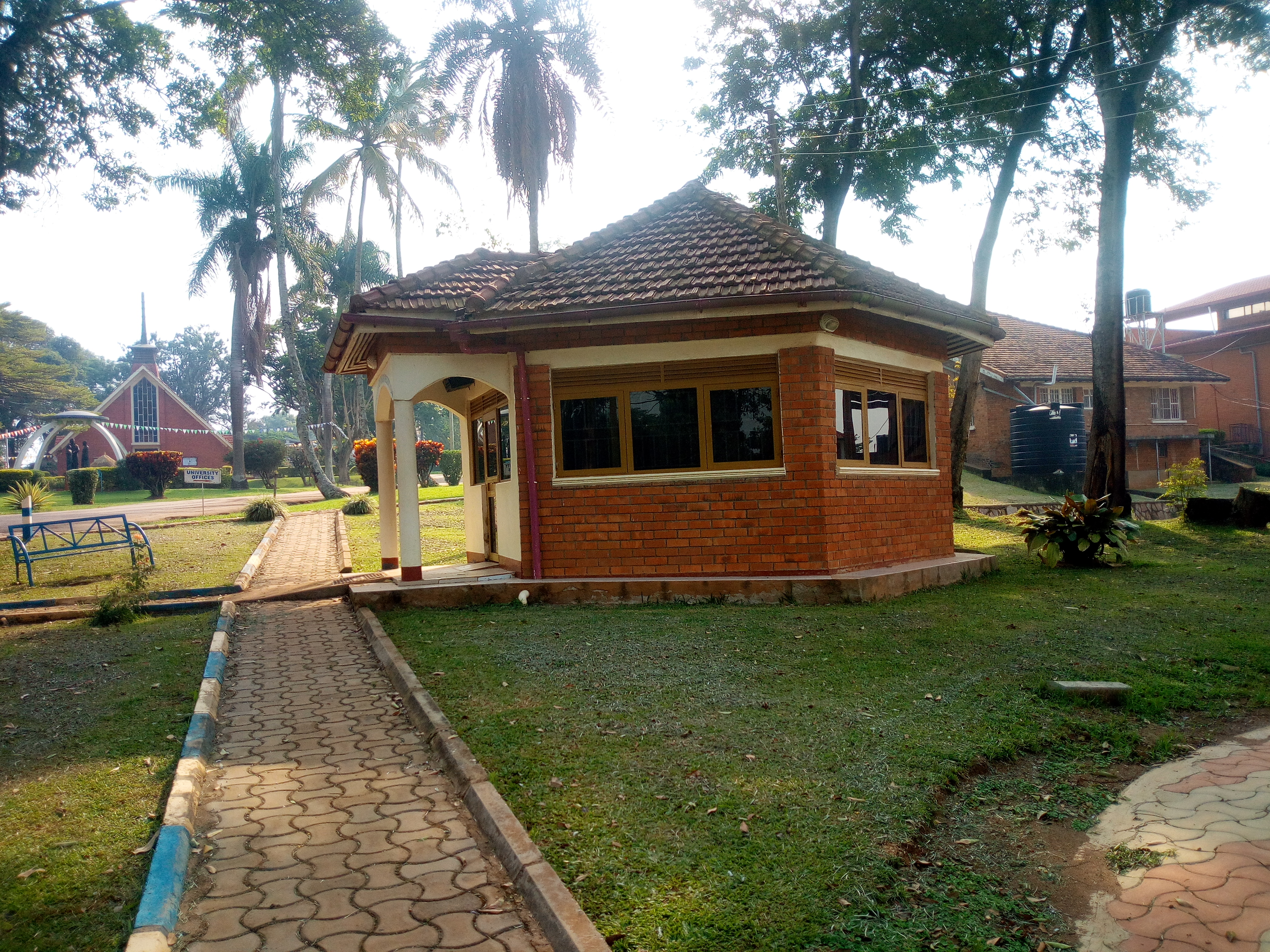
- University of Kisubi
  St. Savio Junior School Kisubi, a residential, all-boys elementary school

== See also ==
- List of cities and towns in Uganda
