= Nabisunsa Girls' Secondary School =

Coordinates: 00°20′39″N 32°38′00″E

Nabisunsa Girls Secondary School
- Banda, Kampala District; Uganda

Information
- Type: Public Middle School and High School (8-13)
- Established: 1954
- Principal: Hajjat Zulaika Kabuye
- Athletics: Track, Tennis, Volleyball, Basketball and lacrosse
- Website: Homepage

Nabisunsa Girls Secondary School is an all-girl boarding school located in Kampala, Uganda. The school was founded in 1954 by Prince Badru Kakungulu, a Buganda Royal, in 1954, to offer post-primary education to the Muslim girl-child. Today it admits girls of all faiths.

== Location ==
The school is located on Banda Hill, off the Kampala-Jinja Highway, approximately 9 kilometres (5.6 mi), by road, east of Kampala, Uganda's capital and largest city. The coordinates of Nabisunsa Girls Secondary School are:0°20'39.0"N, 32°38'00.0"E (Latitude:0.344167; Longitude:32.633333).

== Overview ==
Nabisunsa was the name of the mother of Prince Badru Kakungulu, the founder of the school. He named the school after his mother. It opened its doors in 1954 with 52 students. In 2011, the student population was counted at 1,150, with 70 teaching staff (36 male and 34 female). The school offers classes at both O-Level (S1 to S4) and A-Level (S5 to S6).

== Academics ==
The school offers both science and liberal arts subjects from Senior One (Grade 8) through Senior Six (Grade 13).

== Prominent alumni ==
Some of the prominent alumni of the school include the following:

- Ivy Claire Amoko - Chess player.
- Syda Namirembe Bbumba - Accountant, politician and banker. She is the former Minister of Gender, Labor & Social Development. She is the elected Member of Parliament for "Nakaseke County North", in Nakaseke District
- Ruth Nankabirwa - State Minister for Fisheries in the Uganda Cabinet
- Doris Akol - Former Commissioner General, Uganda Revenue Authority - 2014 to 2020.
- Jane Ruth Aceng - Uganda's Minister of Health since 2016.
- Princess Kabakumba Labwoni Masiko - Economist and politician. Current MP for Bujenje County, Masindi District. Former Minister of the Presidency in the Ugandan Cabinet.
- Jackie Chandiru - Musician and entertainer. She was a member of the musical group Blu*3.
- Sylvia Nayebale - Journalist, businesswoman and politician. Member of Parliament for Gomba District Women in 10th Ugandan Parliament (2016 to 2021).
- Esther Kalenzi - Social entrepreneur and founder of 40 Days Over 40 Smiles Foundation
- Rebecca Mpagi - Pilot and military officer.
- Jamila Mayanja - Entrepreneur and educator.
- Rhoda Wanyenze - Physician, public health consultant, academic and medical administrator.

== See also ==
- Education in Uganda
- Kampala District
