= University of the Sacred Heart Gulu =

Private university in Uganda

University of the Sacred Heart Gulu (USHG)
- Motto in English: Health of Mind, Heart and Body
- Type: Private
- Established: 2016
- Academic staff: 40+ (2017)
- Students: 120+ (2017)
- Location: Gulu, Uganda; 02°46′15″N 32°06′00″E
- Campus: Urban
- Website: Homepage
- Location in Uganda

The University of the Sacred Heart Gulu (USHG) is a private university affiliated with the Roman Catholic Archdiocese of Gulu in Uganda. It caters to students primarily from Uganda and neighboring South Sudan and the Democratic Republic of the Congo.

== Location ==
The university's main campus is located in the western part of the city of Gulu, adjacent to the offices and studios of Radio Pacis Gulu, approximately 5.5 kilometres (3 mi), by road, west of the city centre. The geographical coordinates of the university campus are: 2°46'15.0"N, 32°16'00.0"E (Latitude:2.770833; Longitude:32.266667). In 2016, the Roman Catholic Archdiocese of Gulu donated land, measuring 51 acres (21 ha) for expansion of the university.

== Overview ==
The university was established to bridge the gap between the services offered by Gulu University, the public institution of higher learning, and the need for higher education among the population, both locally and regionally. Courses in Information and communications technology and Counseling psychology were selected to start with, due to the high levels of suicide, alcohol and drug abuse, as a result of twenty years of the Lord's Resistance Army insurgency.

Courses in the health science arena are planned for the future, in conjunction with St. Mary's Hospital Lacor, St. Joseph's Hospital Kitgum and Dr. Ambrosoli Memorial Hospital, in Agago District. Immediate challenges include the lack of adequate student accommodation near the current lecture rooms.

== Academics ==
The university has one faculty at the beginning; the Faculty of Arts and Social Sciences. The faculty has two departments (a) Department of Counselling and (b) Department of Information and Communications Technology. Two degrees are on offer, the Bachelor of Counselling Psychology and the Bachelor of Information Systems.

== See also ==
- Uganda Martyrs University
- Lacor Hospital
- List of universities in Uganda
- Education in Uganda
