= Makindye =

Neighborhood in Kampala, Uganda

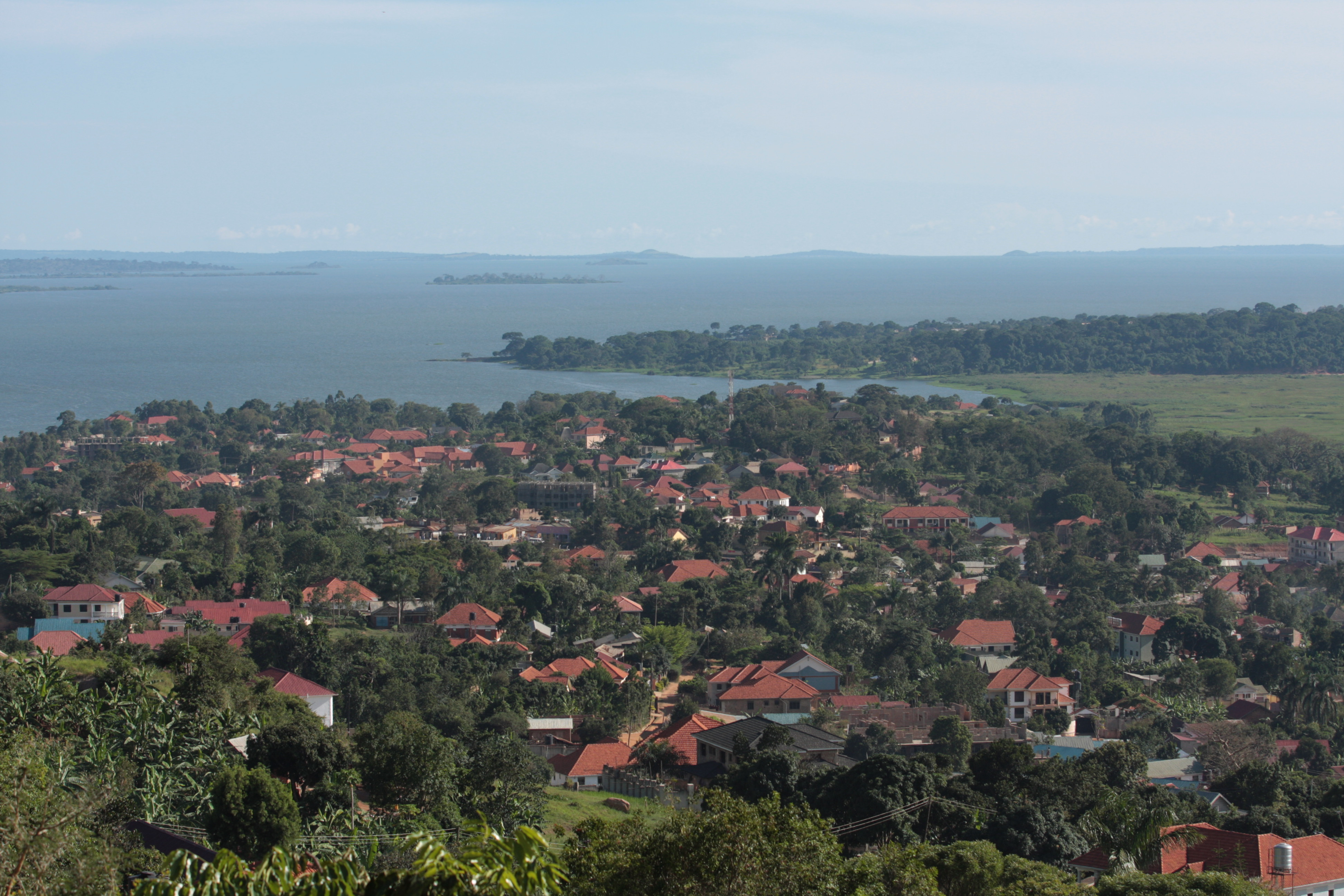
- Aerial view of Munyonyo in Makindye

- Map of Kampala showing the location of Makindye.
- Coordinates: 00°16′45″N 32°35′11″E
- Country: Uganda
- Region: Central Uganda
- District: Kampala Capital City Authority
- Division: Makindye Division

Government
  - Major: Dr. Ian Clarke
- Elevation: 1,230 m (4,040 ft)
- Time zone: UTC+3 (EAT)

Makindye is a hill in Kampala, Uganda's largest city and capital. The name also refers to the neighborhood that sits on that hill. Makindye is also the seat of Makindye Division, one of the five administrative zones of the city of Kampala.

== Location ==
Makindye is bordered by Nsambya to the north, Kibuye to the northwest, Najjanankumbi to the west, Lubowa in Wakiso District to the south, Luwafu to the southeast, and Lukuli to the east. Kansanga and Kabalagala lie to Makindye's northeast. The coordinates of Makindye are 0°16'45.0"N, 32°35'10.0"E (Latitude:0.279175; Longitude:32.586120). The road distance between Makindye and the central business district of Kampala is about 6 kilometres (3.7 mi).

== Overview ==
Makindye, at its peak, stands 1,230 metres (4,040 ft) above sea level. It affords a view of the surrounding areas of the city and of neighboring parts of Wakiso District. It also affords a view of Murchison Bay, a part of Lake Victoria to the east and southeast of Makindye. The residential areas on Makindye hill are of middle class proportions. Many of the homes have adjacent plots of land that are often used to grow vegetables.

== Points of interest ==
The following points of interest lie on or near Makindye Hill:

- Headquarters of Makindye Division
- Makindye military police barracks
- Makindye Foursquare Gospel Church - A place of worship affiliated with the Pentecostal Movement
- Kiruddu General Hospital - A public hospital administered by the Uganda Ministry of Health - In development.

== Photos ==
- Photo of Gas Station in Makindye

== See also ==
- Kampala Capital City Authority
- Nsambya
- Makindye Prison
