= Nakawa =

- Map of Kampala showing the location of Nakawa.
- Coordinates: 00°19′59″N 32°37′05″E
- Country: Uganda
- Region: Central Uganda
- District: Kampala Capital City Authority
- Division: Nakawa Division
- Time zone: UTC+3 (EAT)

Nakawa is an area in the city of Kampala, Uganda's capital. It is also the location of the headquarters of Nakawa Division, one of the five administrative divisions of Kampala.

== Location ==
Nakawa is located on the eastern edge of the city of Kampala. It is bordered by Ntinda to the north, Kyambogo to the northeast, Banda and Kireka to the est, Mbuya to the southeast, Bugoloobi to the south, Namuwongo to the southwest, Kololo in Kampala Central Division to the west, and Naguru to the northwest. The road distance between Kampala's central business district and Nakawa is approximately 5 kilometres (3.1 mi). The coordinates of Nakawa are 0°19'59.0"N, 32°37'05.0"E (Latitude:0.333055; Longitude:32.618066).

== Overview ==
Nakawa lies on the main highway between Kampala and Jinja. From a mere intersection of the Kampala-Jinja Highway and Ntinda Road' in the 1950s, Nakawa has grown into a bustling metropolitan area with small, medium, and large industries and some of Uganda's highest institutions of learning. It is also home to Kampala Cemetery that contains 26 Commonwealth burials of the Second World War, the total made up of 19 soldiers of the East African Forces and seven men belonging to the Uganda Police.

== Landmarks ==
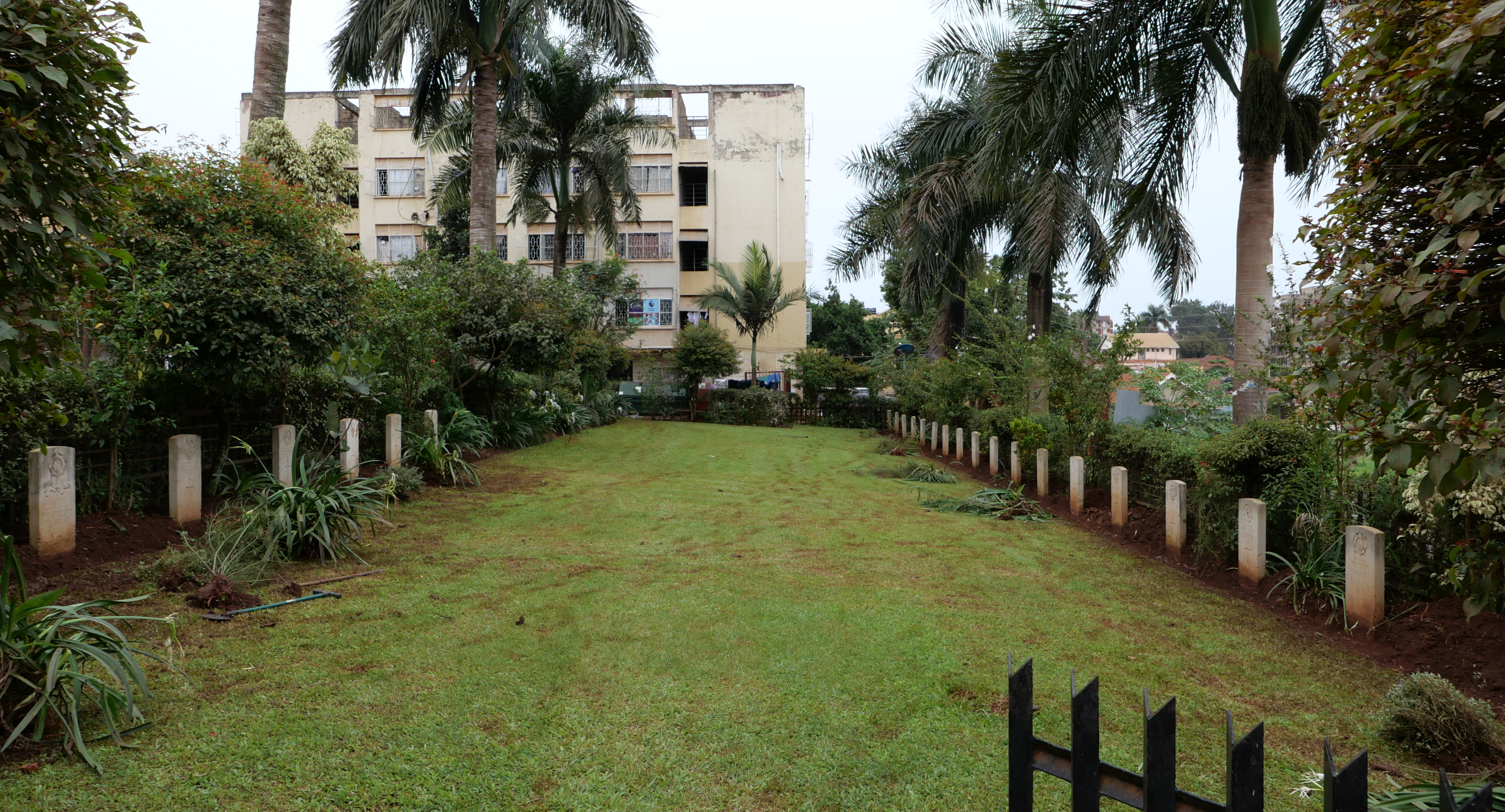
KampalaNakawaRoadCemetery-The Kampala (Nakawa Road) Cemetery in the Ugandan capital. The war graves plot contains 26 Commonwealth burials of WWII: 19 soldiers of the East African Forces and seven men belonging to the Uganda Police. One WWI casualty is commemorated by special memorial, and the Commonwealth War Graves Commission also cares for one Belgian war grave in the cemetery.

Nakawa has the following landmarks:

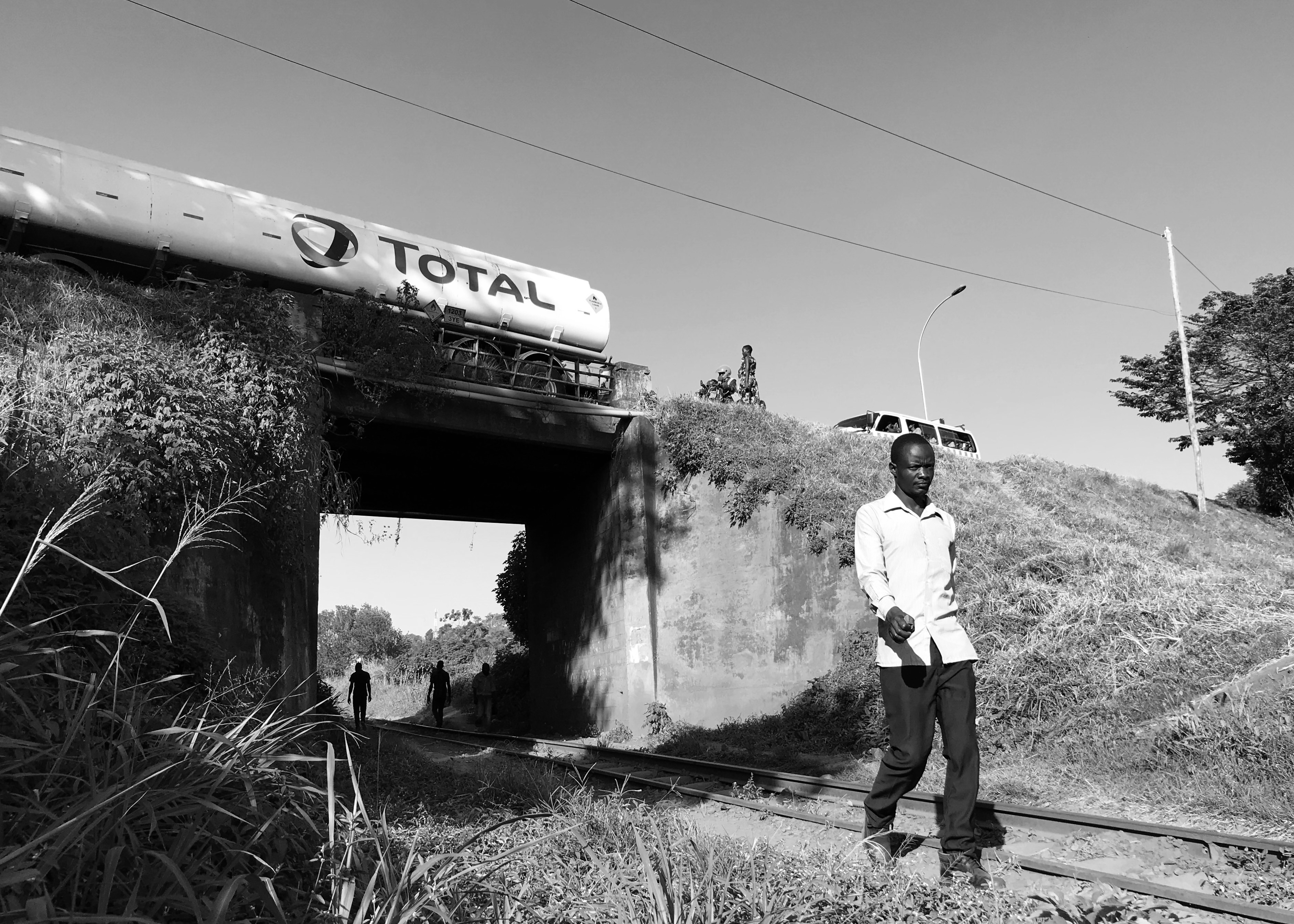
Train bridge in Nakawa

- headquarters of Nakawa Division
- headquarters of Uganda Revenue Authority
- Nakawa Farmers Market
- The offices of Uganda Securities Exchange
- Uganda Industrial Research Institute
- campus of Makerere University Business School
- Kampala-Jinja Highway traverses the northern part of Nakawa in a west–east direction.
- Minister's Village, an affluent residential area set in nearby Ntinda, another city neighborhood.
- Kyadondo Rugby Club ground, one of the locations bombed by Somalia's Shabab in the July 2010 Kampala attacks

== See also ==
- Kampala Capital City Authority
- Luzira
- Kyambogo University
