= Mbuya =

- Map of Kampala showing the location of Mbuya.
- Coordinates: 00°19′39″N 32°37′48″E
- Country: Uganda
- Region: Central Uganda
- District: Kampala Capital City Authority
- Division: Nakawa Division
- Elevation: 1,300 m (4,300 ft)
- Time zone: UTC+3 (EAT)

Mbuya is a hill in southeastern Kampala, the capital city of Uganda. The hill rises 1,300 metres (4,300 ft) above sea level. The name also applies to the upscale residential neighborhood that sits on that hill, as well as the government military installations located there.

== Location ==
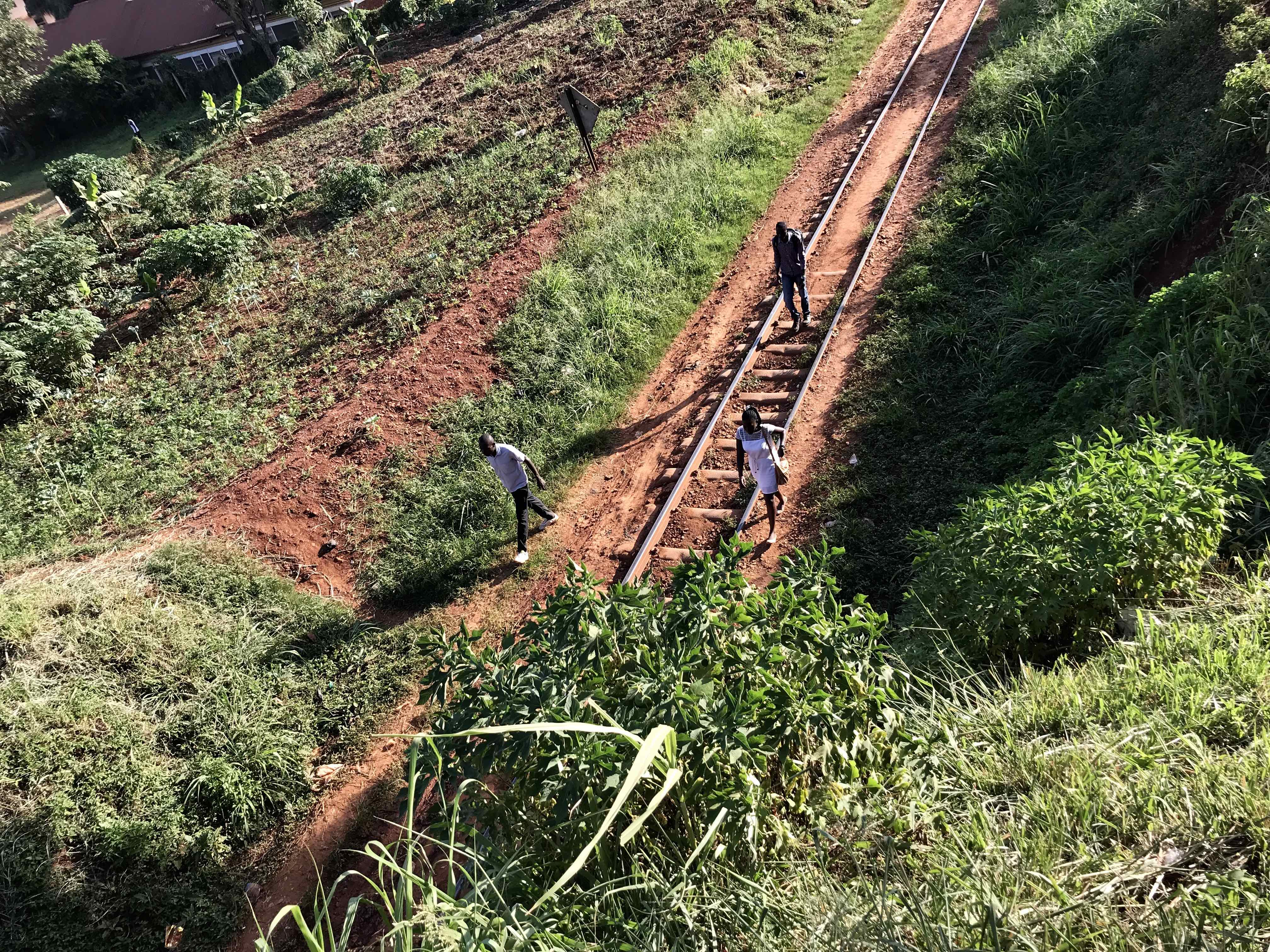
Pedestrians walk along the train tracks near New Port Bell Road

Mbuya is located in Nakawa Division, one of the five administrative divisions of Kampala. It is bordered by Kyambogo to the north, Kinawataka and Kireka to the northeast, Butabika and Biina to the east, Mutungo to the southeast, Port Bell, Kitintale and Bugoloobi to the south, Namuwongo to the southwest, Nakawa to the west and Ntinda to the northwest. Mbuya is located approximately 9 kilometres (5.6 mi), by road, east of Kampala's central business district. The coordinates of Mbuya are: 0°19'39.0"N, 32°37'48.0"E (Latitude: 0.3275; Longitude: 32.6300).

== History ==
Before Europeans came to Uganda, Mbuya was the seat of Kaggo, a Luganda word meaning whip. Kaggo is the title of the County Chief of Kyaddondo, then one of the 20 counties of Buganda. Today Kyaddondo surrounds Kampala to the north and east and includes most of present-day Kampala. The county headquarters were eventually moved to Kasangati and Mbuya was converted into an upscale residential and commercial area.

== Notable residents ==
- Sam Odaka – former Foreign Minister of Uganda (1964–1971)

== Points of interest ==
The following points of interest are located in Mbuya:

- The headquarters of the Uganda Ministry of Defense
- Mbuya Military Referral Hospital - one of two military hospitals in Uganda; the other is located in Bombo
- The Embassy of the Vatican
- The Embassy of Cuba
- The residence of the Papal Nuncio
- The Consulate of the Republic of Ghana
- The residence of the High Commissioner of Trinidad and Tobago
- Our Lady of Africa Catholic cathedral
- Reach Out Mbuya HIV/AIDS Initiative

== See also ==
- Nakawa Division
- UPDF
- KCCA
- Uganda hospitals
