= Kibuye, Uganda =

- Map of Kampala showing the location of Kibuye.
- Coordinates: 00°17′37″N 32°34′23″E
- Country: Uganda
- Region: Central Uganda
- District: Kampala Capital City Authority
- Division: Makindye Division
- Elevation: 1,180 m (3,870 ft)
- Time zone: UTC+3 (EAT)

Kibuye is an area within the city of Kampala, Uganda's capital.

== Location ==
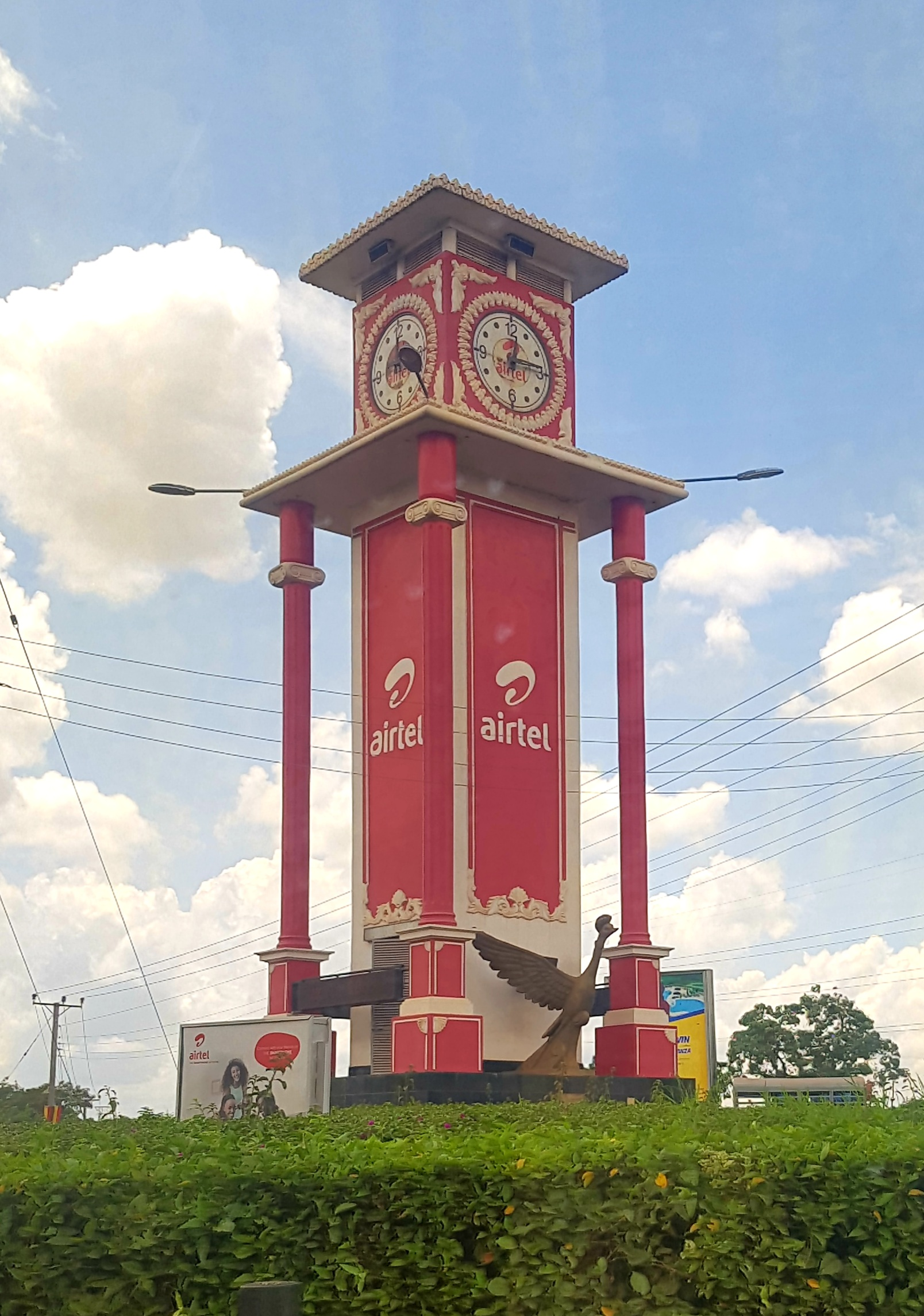
Airtel Clock Tower, Kibuye

Kibuye is bordered by Katwe to the north, Nsambya to the east, Makindye to the south, Ndeeba to the west, and Mengo to the northwest. This location is approximately 3 kilometres (2 mi), by road, south of Kampala's central business district.

== Overview ==
Kibuye is a low-income residential area, with emphasis on entertainment. Due to its proximity to the slum in Katwe and the business suburbs of Ndeeba and Makindye, Kibuye is a combination of these environments. There are numerous bars, pubs and nightclubs clustered in a fairly confined area of the city. As is the case with neighboring Katwe, Kibuye has a high crime rate.

== Points of interest ==
The following points of interest lie in or near Kibuye:

- Kibuye Roundabout - The confluence of the Kampala–Entebbe Road, the Kampala–Masaka Road and the Kampala–Makindye Road.
- Good Samaritan Senior Secondary School - A private high school
- Kibuye central market - A fresh-produce market administered by the Buganda government
- Kibuye Primary School - A public elementary school
- The railway line from Kampala to Kasese goes through Kibuye

== See also ==
- Kampala-Entebbe Road
