= Makindye Division =

Administrative division of Kampala, Uganda

Coordinates: 0°17′00″N 32°35′00″E

Makindye Division is one of the five administrative divisions of Kampala, the capital of Uganda, and the largest city in that country. The city's five divisions are Kampala Central Division, Kawempe Division, Lubaga Division, Makindye Division, and Nakawa Division.

== Location ==
Makindye Division is in the southeastern corner of the city, bordering Wakiso District to the south and west. The eastern boundary of the division is Murchison Bay, a part of Lake Victoria. Nakawa Division lies to the northeast of Makindye Division. Kampala Central Division lies to the north and Lubaga Division lies to the northwest. The coordinates of Makindye Division are:0°17'00.0"N, 32°35'00.0"E (Latitude:0.283334; Longitude:32.583334). Makindye, where the divisional headquarters are located, sits approximately 6 kilometres (3.7 mi), by road, southeast of Kampala's central business district.

== Overview ==
Neighborhoods in the division include Bukasa, Buziga, Ggaba, Kabalagala, Muyenga, Katwe, Kibuli, Kibuye, Kisugu, Lukuli, Luwafu, Makindye, Munyonyo, Nsambya, Nsambya Police Barracks, Salaama and Wabigalo.

The following points of interest are located in Makindye Division:

- Embassy of the United States
- Nsambya Hospital
- Kampala University, main campus
- Kampala International University, main campus
- Munyonyo Martyrs Shrine
- Cavendish University Uganda
- Headquarters of the Uganda Catholic Secretariat - Nsambya
- Ggaba National Seminary - Roman Catholic
- International Hospital Kampala
- Little Light Uganda - a non-governmental organization
- Monitor Publications - a subsidiary of Nation Media Group

== See also ==
- Divisions of Kampala
- Makindye Prison
- KCCA
- IHK
- Munyonyo
