= Uganda National Council for Higher Education =

Regulatory agency

- UNCHE

Agency overview
- Formed: 2001
- Jurisdiction: Government of Uganda
- Headquarters: Plot M834, Kigobe Road Kyambogo, Kampala, Uganda
- Agency executive: Executive Director, Professor Mary J. N. Okwakol
- Parent agency: Uganda Ministry of Education & Sports
- Website: Homepage

The Uganda National Council for Higher Education (UNCHE) is a semi-autonomous government regulatory agency, responsible for the regulation of higher education in Uganda, the third-largest economy in the East African Community. UNCHE is also responsible for provision of guidance in the establishment of institutions of higher education and the provision of assurance that quality and relevant education is delivered, by the licensed institutions.

== Location ==
The headquarters of UNCHE are located at Plot M834, Kigobe Road, Kyambogo, approximately 9 kilometres (5.6 mi), by road, northeast of the central business district of Kampala, the capital and largest city in Uganda. The geographical coordinates of the headquarters of UNCHE are 00°21′29″N 32°37′33″E(Latitude:0.358056; Longitude:32.625833).

== History ==
UNCHE was established by the University and Other Tertiary Act of Parliament (2001) as the regulator of higher education.

== Operations ==
UNCHE's main role is to license new universities and other institutions of higher learning in Uganda. Accreditation may be provisional or permanent, and is revocable at the sole discretion of UNCHE. The agency is also responsible for monitoring the performance of the institutions that it licenses, to ensure that they maintain the standards, if satisfactory, and remedy those aspects, where improvement is needed. The agency is governed by a board of directors, and is managed by a Management Team, led by the executive director.

The current chairman of the board of directors, effective 22 March 2019, is Professor Elly Katunguka, the Vice Chancellor of Kyambogo University. His term runs until 21 March 2024.

== See also ==
- Uganda Education
- UG Business Schools
- Uganda Universities
- UG University Leaders
- Kampala
