= Muyenga =

Hill in Kampala, Uganda

- Map of Kampala showing the location of Muyenga. Muyenga (Uganda) Muyenga (Africa)
- Coordinates: 00°17′38″N 32°36′41″E
- Country: Uganda
- Region: Central Uganda
- District: Kampala Capital City Authority
- Division: Makindye Division
- Elevation: 1,306 m (4,285 ft)
- Time zone: UTC+3 (EAT)

Muyenga is a hill in Kampala, the capital of Uganda and the largest city in that country. The name also applies to the upscale community that sits on that hill.

== Location ==
Muyenga is located in Makindye Division, one of the five administrative divisions of Kampala. It sits about 8 kilometres (5.0 mi), by road, southeast of the central business district of the city. It is bordered by Bukasa to the east, Kiwuliriza to the north, Kisugu and Kabalagala to the west, Kansanga to the southwest, Kiwafu to the south and Kyeyitabya to the southeast. The coordinates of Muyenga Hill are:0°17'38.0"N, 32°36'41.0"E (Latitude:0.293900; Longitude:32.611400).

== Overview ==
Muyenga, at its peak, stands 4,285 feet (1,306 m) above sea level and is one of the highest points in the city of Kampala. For that reason, the hill was chosen to house the water storage tanks for National Water and Sewerage Corporation, which supply Kampala, Kira and Mukono. Because of the water tanks, Muyenga is also known as Tank Hill. The hill commands expansive views of the city towards the north and the west. To the east and the south the predominant view is that of nearby Lake Victoria.

Prior to Uganda's Independence in 1962 and through the 1960s and 1970s, Muyenga was an upscale residential area, on account of the excellent views and cool breezes. After the removal of the Obote II regime in 1986, there followed a period of rapid, unplanned and uncoordinated development of the real estate on Muyenga. As a result, it is an area with good houses but with a chaotic road and drainage system. Many of the property owners on the hill are from government and business who bought plots and put up expensive buildings without conforming to the rules of urban planning. Kabalagala, a neighborhood to the west of Muyenga, suffered from the same mismanagement of urban planning.

== Points of interest ==
The following points of interest lie on Muyenga Hill or near it:

- Water storage tanks of the National Water and Sewerage Corporation
- Kampala International University (KIU) - one of the 30 universities in Uganda
- Diplomate Hotel
- Kabalagala - Location of numerous restaurants, bars and nightclubs.
- The British School of Kampala

== See also ==
- KCCA
- Kabalagala
- NWSC
- Kansanga
