= List of schools in Uganda =

This is a list of notable schools in the African country of Uganda, sorted by region.

== Central Region ==
- Blessed Sacrament Secondary School, Kimaanya
- Busaana Modern Academy, Bugerere
- Ebony College Luwero, Luweero
- Entebbe Secondary School, Entebbe
- Gayaza High School, Gayaza
- Kako Senior Secondary School, Masaka
- Kibaale Community Schools, Rakai District
- King's College, Budo, Budo
- Kisubi Mapeera Secondary School, Kisubi
- Luweero Secondary School, Luweero
- Masaka Secondary School, Masaka
- Namilyango College, Namilyango
- Namirembe Hill Side High School, Wakiso
- St. Henry's College Kitovu, Masaka
- St. Mary's College, Kisubi
- St. Paul's Secondary School, Lweza
- Taibah College School, Bwebajja
- Trinity College – Nabbingo
- Uganda Martyrs' Secondary School Namugongo – Wakiso Town

=== Kampala ===
- Buganda Road Primary School
- Christian Upliftment School
- École Française Les Grands Lacs
- International School of Uganda
- Kampala International School, Bukoto
- Kampala School for Physically Handicapped
- Kibuli Secondary School, Kibuli
- Kinaawa High School, Kawempe
- Kitante Hill Secondary School
- Kololo Senior Secondary School, Kololo
- Mackay Memorial College, Nateete
- Makerere College School
- Mengo Senior School
- Mount Saint Mary's College, Namagunga
- Mulago School for the Deaf, Mulago
- Nabisunsa Girls' Secondary School, Banda
- Rainbow International School
- Rubaga Community School
- St. Denis Ssebugwawo Secondary School, Ggaba
- Uganda School for the Deaf, Namirembe Hill
- Vienna College Namugongo

== Eastern Region ==
- Bugulumbya Secondary School, Busobya
- Busoga College, Mwiri Hill
- Iganga Boys Boarding Primary School, Iganga
- Jinja College, Jinja
- Kiira College Butiki, Jinja
- Mbale Secondary School, Mbale
- Nabumali High School, Mbale
- Namasagali College, Namasagali
- Ngora High School, Ngora District
- Nkuutu Memorial Secondary School, Busesa
- Serere Township Secondary School, Serere
- Soroti Secondary School, Soroti
- St. Francis School for the Blind, Madera
- St. Peter's College, Tororo
- Teso College, Aloet
- Tororo Girls School, Tororo
- Wanyange Girls School, Nyange Hill

== Northern Region ==
- Dr. Obote College, Boroboro East
- Lango College, Lira
- Mvara Secondary School, Arua
- Pope John Paul II College, Laliya
- Saint Katherine Secondary School, Boroboro
- St. Aloysius College, Nyapea
- St. Joseph's College, Layibi
- St. Joseph's College, Ombaci
- Upper Nile Institute for Appropriate Technology (UNIFAT), Gulu

== Western Region ==
- Bweranyangi Girls' Senior Secondary School, Bushenyi
- Kabalega Secondary School, Masindi
- Kigezi College Butobere, Kabale
- Kigezi High School, Kabale
- Kyamakanda Secondary School, Buyanja
- Kyebambe Girls' Secondary School, Fort Portal
- Maryhill High School. Nyamitanga
- Mbarara High School, Mbarara
- Ntare School, Mbarara
- Nyakasura School, Fort Portal
- Nyakayojo Secondary School, Mbarara
- St. Gertrude's Girls' Vocational Secondary School, Mutolere
- St. John Fisher Ibanda Secondary School, Ibanda
- St. Kaggwa Bushenyi High School, Bushenyi
- St. Leo's College, Fort Portal

== See also ==
- Education in Uganda
- List of vocational colleges in Uganda
