= Salaama School for the Blind =

Special school in Uganda

Salaama School for the Blind is a special needs institution for Persons with Disability in Uganda. The school is inclusive and has blind teachers who train the children with music and music instruments in their free time.The school is found in Kisoga, Mukono district and is under the leadership of Founder and Headmaster Francis Kinubi who has led the school for the past 23 years, The school has been supported by other partners in the Disability sector like National Union for Persons with Disability in Uganda, and Standard Chattered Bank in their Social Cooperate Responsibility by planting trees around the school to protect the environment. The school has been a place for academic values that produce leaders of the future.

Salaama School for the Blind is a Government Aided school established in April 1999 by Mukono Local Government to cater for special needs children and young adults between the ages of six and twenty five.

== Location ==
Salaama School for the Blind is located in Kisoga, Mukono district in Central Uganda.

== Fire Outbreak ==
The school experienced a fire outbreak that claimed the lives of 11 children leaving 6 others hospitalized with injuries as a result of fire that engulfed the student dormitory on October 25, 2022. MTN Uganda in partnership with Government of Uganda through the Ministry of Education and Sports constructed a new Dormitory and a computer laboratory in honor of the students who perished in the 2022 fire outbreak and as well offer more support to improve the learning of special needs children at Salaama School for the Blind.

== See also ==
- National Union of Women with Disabilities in Uganda
- Uganda School for the Deaf
- Mulago School for the Deaf
- Kampala School for Physically Handicapped
