= Akinbobola =

Masculine given name and surname of Yoruba origin

- Gender: Male
- Language: Yoruba

Origin
- Origin: Nigeria
- Meaning: Valor returned and met success/wealth
- Region of origin: South West Nigeria

Other names
- Variant form: Adébọ̀bọ́lá Ọmọ́bọ̀bọ́la Ayọ̀bọ̀bọ́lá
- Short form: Bọ̀bọ́lá Akín

Akinbobola (Yoruba: Akínbọ̀bọ́lá) is a Nigerian masculine given name and surname of Yoruba origin. It means "valor returned and met success/wealth". The name can be analysed morphologically as akin-bọ̀-bá-ọlá, akin refers to valor or bravery, bọ̀ means "to return", bá means "to meet", and ọlá can refer to nobility, success or wealth.

== Notable people with the name ==
- Yemisi Akinbobola, Nigerian media entrepreneur, academic and journalist
- Ariyike Akinbobola, Nigerian television presenter, author, lawyer and actress
