= Butabika School of Psychiatric Nursing =

Public psychiatric nursing training institution in Uganda

- Type: Public nursing training institution
- Established: 1960
- Parent institution: Ministry of Health (Uganda)
- Affiliations: Butabika National Referral Hospital
- Location: Kampala, Uganda; 0°19′12″N 32°39′27″E

Butabika School of Psychiatric Nursing is a public nursing training institution in Uganda that specializes in psychiatric and mental health nursing. It is located in Butabika, Kampala, and is affiliated with Butabika National Referral Hospital, the national referral hospital for mental health services in Uganda.

The institution contributes to training psychiatric nurses who support Uganda's mental health workforce amid increasing demand for mental health services in the country.

== History ==
The school was established in 1960 to support training of mental health professionals in Uganda's health system.

It is one of the long-established institutions in Uganda dedicated to psychiatric nursing education, and has continued to train mental health practitioners for public and private healthcare facilities across the country.

Over time, the institution expanded its training from certificate-level programmes to diploma-level psychiatric and mental health nursing training in response to workforce needs in Uganda's health sector.

== Location ==
The school is located in Butabika, a suburb in Nakawa Division, Kampala, near Butabika National Referral Hospital, which serves as its main clinical training site.

== Academic programmes ==
The school offers accredited training in psychiatric and mental health nursing, including:

- Certificate in Mental Health Nursing
- Diploma in Mental Health Nursing (Direct Entry)
- Diploma in Mental Health Nursing (Extension Programme)

The programmes are accredited by the National Council for Higher Education.

== Clinical training ==
Students undertake clinical training at Butabika National Referral Hospital, Uganda's main psychiatric referral hospital, where they gain practical experience in mental health care, psychiatric assessment, counselling, and rehabilitation services.

== Role in Uganda's mental health system ==
The school has been identified in media reports as an important institution in addressing Uganda's shortage of mental health professionals.

It contributes to the training of psychiatric nurses who serve in government and private health facilities, supporting mental health service delivery across Uganda.

During its 2026 graduation ceremony, the institution graduated hundreds of students in psychiatric nursing programmes amid national discussions on mental health workforce shortages.

== See also ==
- Butabika National Referral Hospital
- Mental health in Uganda
- Healthcare in Uganda
- Salaama School for the Blind
- Mulago School for the Deaf
