= Upendo Ni Baraka Uganda =

Ugandan non-governmental organization

Upendo Ni Baraka Uganda is a Ugandan Women-led non-governmental organization working on the intersection of supporting Women with Disabilities in Arua City in located in Westnile sub-region in northern Uganda. The organization was founded in January 2023 to support the needs of women, children and community members with disabilities. Since its inception, under the leadership of the Executive Director, Betty Wazu, the organization has reached out to over 5000 disabled persons within the region. The organization adopted a holistic family centered approach in their programming and has established community structures that support their mapping initiatives like Girl Glow, Mama Wisdom and Men & Boys Coach models to reach out to persons with disabilities to strengthen community voices through policy advocacy and awareness.

Upendo Ni Baraka Uganda in their strategic plan for 2025-2030 incorporates Sexual Reproductive Health Rights and Climate resilience to their programming to support the community.

== Location ==
Upendo Ni Baraka Uganda is found in Arua city in Westnile sub-region of Northern Uganda. It operates in the districts of Madi Okollo, Yumbe and Terego including refugee settlements and host communities.

== See also ==
- National Union of Women with Disabilities of Uganda
- National Union of Persons with Disability in Uganda

== External Link ==
- Radio Pacis
