= Uganda School for the Deaf =

Special needs school in Uganda

Coordinates: 0.3527°N 32.6161°E

Uganda School for the Deaf is a special needs school for Persons with Disabilities in Uganda. The school was established in 1959 by Uganda Society for the Deaf in Namirembe Hill, a Kampala suburb, but initially the school was operational in 1952 where it first started in a single room behind Mengo Secondary School. Uganda School for the Deaf is a government Aided primary school having a special needs curriculum and vocational studies for children with all forms of disabilities including deaf children with multiple disabilities, The school is under the leadership of headteacher Juliet Mary Tumuhairwe. According to statistics from Uganda National Bureau of Statistics, Uganda has close to 2 million deaf persons representing 2.9% of the population with 95% of adults estimated not to have attended school or formal education

The school holds career development activities to empower children with disabilities and the special needs community to embrace disability inclusion in employment professions with consideration of special needs people through partners like Brighter Monday and Mastercard Foundation in collaboration with the National Union of Persons with Disability in Uganda and National Council for Disability. Through partnerships, the Uganda Communications Commission has established ICT Hubs to support persons with disabilities in digital skills and ICT innovations.

== Location ==
Uganda school for the deaf is located in Ntinda, Nakawa division in Kampala, Uganda.

== See also ==
- National Union of Persons with Disability in Uganda
- Mulago School for the Deaf
- Kampala School for Physically Handicapped
- National Union of Women with Disabilities of Uganda
- Albinism
- Disability in Uganda
