= Esther Kyozira =

Ugandan disability rights activist

- Citizenship: Ugandan
- Occupation: Disability rights activist
- Organizations: National Council for Persons with Disabilities; National Association of Women Organizations in Uganda (NAWOU)
- Known for: Advocacy for disability rights and inclusion in Uganda, including the Persons with Disabilities Act 2020 and Mental Health Act 2019
- Title: CEO, National Union of Disabled Persons of Uganda (2021–present); Chairperson, National Council for Persons with Disabilities (2008–2012)
- Awards: Diamond Jubilee Medal (2024)

Esther Kyozira is an Ugandan disability rights activist. She is the CEO of the National Union of Persons with Disability in Uganda, an umbrella organization which advocates for the rights and inclusion of people with disabilities in Uganda. Kyozira works to advance legal representation of people with disabilities to ensure they are protected by legal and institutional frameworks, including their right to education, work, and participation to governance structures in Uganda.

== Career ==
Kyozira previously worked as a Country Program Officer at the Disability Rights Fund. She was a board member for the Higher Education Students' Financing Board (HESFB) and the National Association of Women Organizations in Uganda (NAWOU) (2014-2021), served as Chairperson of the National Council for Persons with Disabilities (2008-2012), and was coordinator of the Hi-Tech Project for the National Association of the Blind.

In 2021, Kyozira was appointed CEO of the National Union of Disabled Persons in Uganda (NUDIPU). She had previously worked as their programme director.

Kyozira also serves on the governing councils of Uganda’s National Curriculum Development Centre and Judicial Council.

=== Advocacy ===
Kyozira pushed for the passing of the Persons with Disabilities Act 2020 and the Mental Health Act 2019.

Kyozira has pushed for government agencies like the Ministry of Works and Transport to favor people with disabilities to ensure safe road use and minimize accidents. She supports government intervention policies that ensure inclusion and empowerment. For example the State Minister for Disability Affairs, with guidelines passed a resolution to the Ministry of Local Government that include provisions to empower People with Disabilities in the Parish Development Model program to improve the income generation of enterprises owned by Persons with Disabilities in Uganda.

== Personal life ==
Kyozira is visually impaired.

== Awards and recognitions ==
- 2024 Diamond Jubilee Medal, presented by the President of Uganda

== See also ==
- Hellen Asamo
- Sarah Bireete
- Regina Bafaki
