= Fisher High School =

Fisher High School or similar names might refer to:

- Ida M. Fisher Junior-Senior High School — a Miami Beach, Florida school whose high school was renamed to Miami Beach High School and whose campus later became Fienberg-Fisher K-8 School
- Fisher Junior/Senior High School (Illinois) — a school in Fisher, Illinois and Fisher Community Unit School District 1; teams are the Bunnies
- Fishers High School — a school in Fishers, Indiana and the Hamilton Southeastern School District; closed in 1969 but re-established at a different location in the 2000s; teams are the Tigers
- Fisher Middle-High School — a school in Lafitte, Louisiana and the Jefferson Parish Public Schools; teams are the Gators
- Fisher Secondary School (Minnesota) — part of Fisher School, the public school in Fisher, Minnesota and the Fisher Public School District; teams are the Knights
- Emily Fisher Charter High School — part of Emily Fisher Charter School in Trenton, New Jersey
- William V. Fisher Catholic High School — a school in Fairfield, Ohio and the Roman Catholic Diocese of Columbus; teams are the Irish
- Fisher Junior-Senior High School (Texas) — a former high school in Athens, Texas and the Athens Independent School District, ended in the 1960s (and whose campus may have been closed as a middle school in the 2000s)

== See also ==
- Fisher School-High Street Historic District — a historic district in Westwood, Massachusetts
- Fisher Park High School — a former high school in Ottawa, Ontario, Canada, that is now a middle school named Fisher Park Public School
- St John Fisher School (disambiguation) — several schools of this name
