= Busobya =

Village in the Kamuli District, Uganda

- Village
- Location within Uganda
- Coordinates: 0°48′29″N 33°12′34″E
- Country: Uganda
- Region: Eastern Region
- District: Kamuli District
- County: Buzaaya
- Sub-county: Bugulumbya
- Parish: Bugulumbya
- Time zone: UTC+3 (EAT)

Busobya is a village in the Kamuli District of Uganda. In June 2005 it was announced that its Bugulumbya Secondary School was to become the first Nepad e-school.

== Location and administration ==
Busobya is administered under Bugulumbya Parish and Bugulumbya Sub-county in Buzaaya County (Kamuli District).

== Population ==
The Uganda Bureau of Statistics (2014 census tables) reports the following totals for the administrative areas where Busobya is located: Bugulumbya Parish: 8,413 people (2014). Bugulumbya Sub-county: 36,281 people (2014). Kamuli District: 486,319 people (2014).

== Education and ICT ==
Busobya is associated with Bugulumbya Secondary School, which was selected as Uganda’s first NEPAD e-school during the NEPAD e-Schools initiative demonstration phase.

A UN Africa Renewal report described Bugulumbya Secondary School as the first institution to receive computers under the NEPAD e-school initiative in July 2005, noting upgrades that supported ICT access in a rural setting, including electricity supply arrangements and connectivity for learning.

A World Bank public report on the NEPAD e-Schools Demonstration Project lists Bugulumbya Secondary School as a launch school for Uganda under the project’s country and school assignments.

== See also ==
- Kamuli District
- Bugulumbya Secondary School
