= EvaluNet =

South African developer of educational software

- Company type: Pty Ltd
- Industry: Educational Software
- Founded: 1995
- Headquarters: Cape Town, South Africa
- Area served: South Africa, Namibia, Botswana, Jamaica and surrounding Caribbean countries
- Products: Learning, revision and assessment software
- Revenue: ▲ unspecified
- Net income: ▲ unspecified
- Number of employees: 12 (South Africa only)
- Divisions: EvaluNet (Pty) Ltd; Teacher's Monthly
- Website: www.evalunet.com

EvaluNet (Pty) Ltd is a South African-based developer of educational software headquartered in Cape Town. The company was founded in 1995 as Interactive Learning Solutions and changed name to EvaluNet in 1999. In September 1999, Naspers, a multinational JSE-listed media company, purchased a 49% share holding in EvaluNet. In 2002, the company founder and MD, Dereck Marnewick, purchased this share holding back from Naspers.

In 2003, the South African National Department of Education commissioned EvaluNet and four other local companies to form a national body representing educational vendors in their dealings with government and educational institutions. The organization is called the Associated Distributors of Educational Supplies in Southern Africa and currently represents 40 members.

== Products ==
In 1996, EvaluNet become the first company to introduce the concept of assessment and testing software to the South African school and business market. By September 2000, 300 South African schools were using EvaluNet's flagship software product e-SCHOOL to conduct paperless tests and examinations.

In 2005, e-SCHOOL was criticized for being too open-ended for most South African teachers that require more content-rich resources. The company has since revised its product offering and has released new titles under the Biblion, GetAhead, XT (the replacement to e-SCHOOL) and MathPRO brands.

EvaluNet has also had a role to play in developing online resources for teachers in South Africa, namely with its online publication Teacher's Monthly and its involvement in developing an online publication entitled Teaching English Today for the English Academy of Southern Africa ― the only academy for the English language in the world.

== Partnerships ==
In 1997, EvaluNet was contracted by MWEB, one of South Africa's biggest Internet service providers, to develop MWEB School, which became South Africa's first online learning portal. This partnership remained until late 1999. In that same year, EvaluNet became the first South African educational software developer to engage in ecommerce to market products online.

In 2006, EvaluNet became a partner in the NEPAD E-School Programme initiative by way of the Oracle Consortium. This consortium comprised a total of fourteen companies, including the Oracle Corporation.

In September 2010, EvaluNet announced a partnership with Woolworths (South Africa) MySchool MyPlanet MyVillage corporate social investment initiative. This partnership saw EvaluNet software marketed via the MySchool initiative with a resulting contribution of income used to uplift schools in disadvantaged communities.

In 2011, EvaluNet announced a partnership with EPA Technologies, a Jamaican-based educational software developer serving the Caribbean region. This partnership took EvaluNet products into the overseas market and formed a new direction for business development. This new venture is headed up by Adrian Marnewick who is the EvaluNet Business Development Manager and son of EvaluNet MD and founder Dereck Marnewick.
