= David Boulware =

British researcher

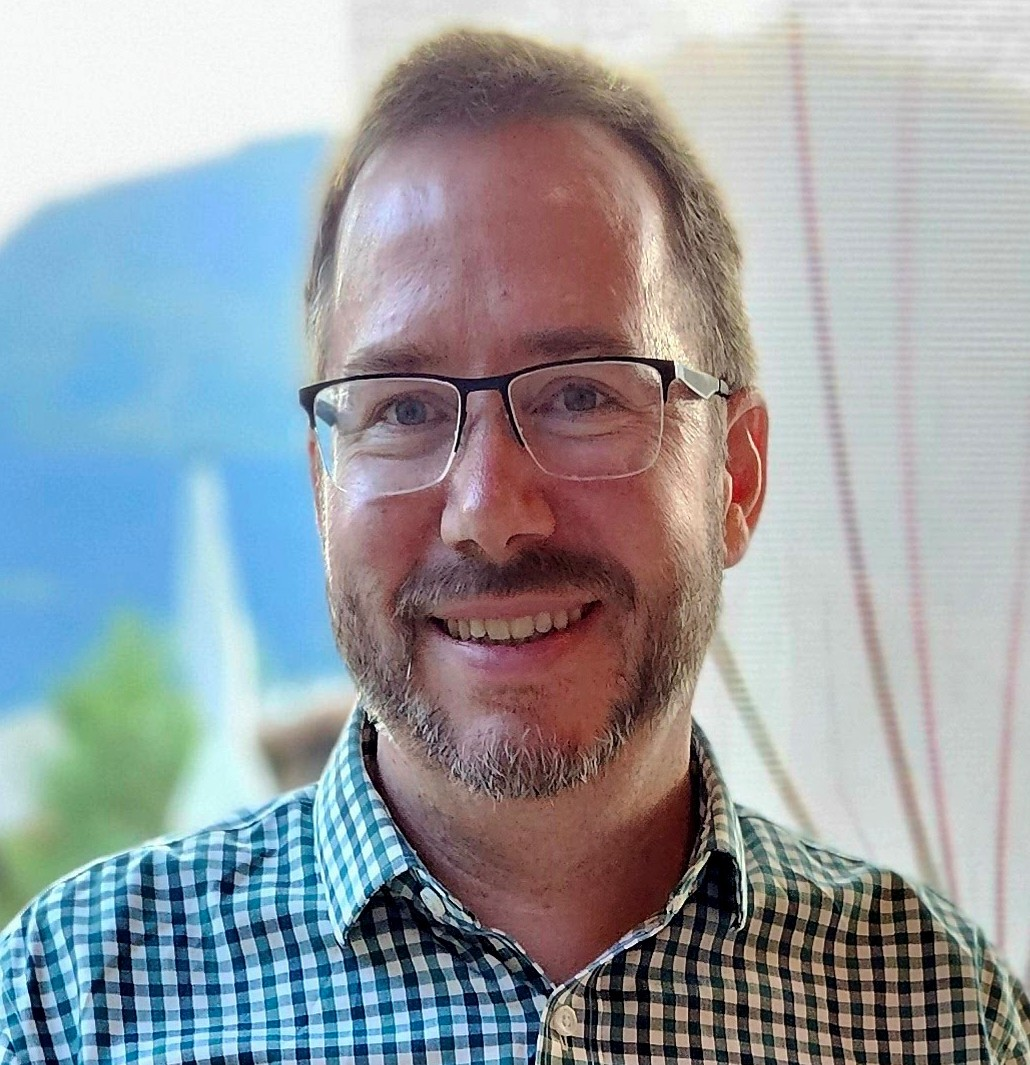
- Born: 1974 (age 51–52); United States
- Citizenship: United States, United Kingdom^{[explain status]}
- Education: Indiana University School of Medicine
- Occupation: Physician infectious diseases (medical specialty)
- Years active: 2004–present
- Known for: COVID-19, meningitis, HIV researcher
- Title: Professor of Medicine at University of Minnesota

David Boulware is a professor of medicine and a practicing infectious disease physician at the University of Minnesota Medical School. He is a member of the graduate faculty for the University of Minnesota School of Public Health Epidemiology PhD program and for the Microbiology, Immunology, and Cancer Biology (MICaB) graduate program. Boulware was the first Lois & Richard King Distinguished Assistant Professorship at the University of Minnesota. Boulware is an active medical researcher engaged in clinical trials in infectious diseases. His expertise is particularly in the realm of HIV-related meningitis, including Cryptococcosis and Tuberculous meningitis.

== Education ==
Boulware graduated from Wabash College in 1996 with a Bachelor of Arts in Chemistry. He later attended the Indiana University School of Medicine, graduating in 2000. He completed various residencies and fellowships from 2000 to 2007, receiving a certificate in tropical medicine from the Centers for Disease Control and Prevention (CDC) in 2006. He completed his master's in public health in 2007.

== Career ==
Boulware joined the faculty of the University of Minnesota in 2007, becoming an assistant professor of medicine in the Division of Infectious Disease and International Medicine at the University of Minnesota's Department of Medicine. Around the same time, he began working within the university's Center for Infectious Diseases and Microbiology Translational Research (CIDMTR) to study HIV/AIDS and cryptococcal meningitis with the Infectious Diseases Institute in Uganda.

He was named to the Lois and Richard King Distinguished Assistant Professorship at the school in 2011.

=== COVID-19 ===
Boulware's primary research has been focused on improving the diagnosis, prevention, and treatment of cryptococcal meningitis. However, he is best known for outpatient COVID-19 clinical trials, pioneering remote de-centralized, internet-based clinical trials during the COVID-19 pandemic.

Boulware's team rapidly launched a series of three U.S. nationwide randomized clinical trials testing hydroxychloroquine for post-exposure prophylaxis, early treatment, and pre-exposure prophylaxis for prevention of COVID-19 on March 17, 2020. These were among the first U.S. trials to be launched. The pre-exposure prophylaxis trial was reported June 3, 2020 showing that taking hydroxychloroquine was not effective at preventing COVID-19. As described, "To say that the recruitment of this post-exposure prophylaxis trial was innovative hardly gives the methods enough credit." These trials were pioneering for being remote internet-based randomized decentralized clinical trials.

The hydroxychloroquine early treatment trial was the first large phase III, outpatient randomized clinical trial testing an outpatient therapy for COVID-19. Subsequent, meta-analysis of 11 outpatient hydroxychloroquine randomized trials of 2037 participants showed zero benefit for reducing hospitalization While pre-exposure prophylaxis with hydroxychloroquine for prevention was promoted on May 18, 2020, the subsequent randomized trial did not show any benefit.

Describing the experimental antiviral drug remdesivir in June 2020, Boulware said that the medicine could provide "a reasonable value" if it reduced the length of stay in hospital for COVID-19 patients. This true early in the pandemic waves when hospital beds were in limited supply.

Boulware served as senior investigator on other trials testing early treatments for COVID-19 including the TogetherTrial ivermectin;, which demonstrated that ivermectin did not have a clinical benefit for early COVID-19. University of Minnesota's COVID-Out randomized trial testing metformin, ivermectin, and fluvoxamine. The Covid-Out trial reported a 42% reduction in COVID-related emergency room visits and hospitalizations through 14-days with the use of metformin. Metformin also had a 58% reduction in hospitalizations through 28-days and reduced long COVID by 41% through 10-months. In December 2021 at the beginning of the Omicron wave, Boulware took the initiative to apply to the U.S. FDA for an Emergency Use Authorization for fluvoxamine 100 mg twice daily. This low cost generic medicine of fluvoxamine reduced covid-related hospitalizations by 25% as well as reducing ER visits and hospitalizations. FDA rejected the EUA request for this low cost generic medicine questioning whether reducing prolonged ER visits and hospitalizations represents a clinically meaningful benefit. Dr. Boulware has been a proponent of repurposed medicines which actually have benefit for COVID-19, including metformin, interferon-lambda, and higher-dose fluvoxamine.

Boulware serves as the national co-chair of the trial steering committee for the NIH ACTIV-6 platform clinical trial testing repurposed medicines for COVID-19. ACTIV-6 trial has tested outpatient COVID-19 therapies including ivermectin, inhaled fluticasone, low-dose fluvoxamine 50 mg twice daily, fluvoxamine 100 mg twice daily, montelukast, and metformin.

== Notable contributions and honors ==
- World Health Organization 2017 Guidelines for managing advanced HIV disease and rapid initiation of antiretroviral therapy
- World Health Organization 2018 Guidelines for the diagnosis, prevention and management of cryptococcal disease in HIV-infected adults, adolescents and children
- US Guidelines for the Prevention and Treatment of Opportunistic Infections in Adults and Adolescents with HIV—guideline committee member
- American Society for Clinical Investigation, honorary medicine society elected member 2020.
- Association of American Physicians, honorary medicine society elected member 2023.
