= Paulson Luttamaguzi =

Ugandan politician and economist

Hon. Paulson Kasana Semakula Luttamaguzi
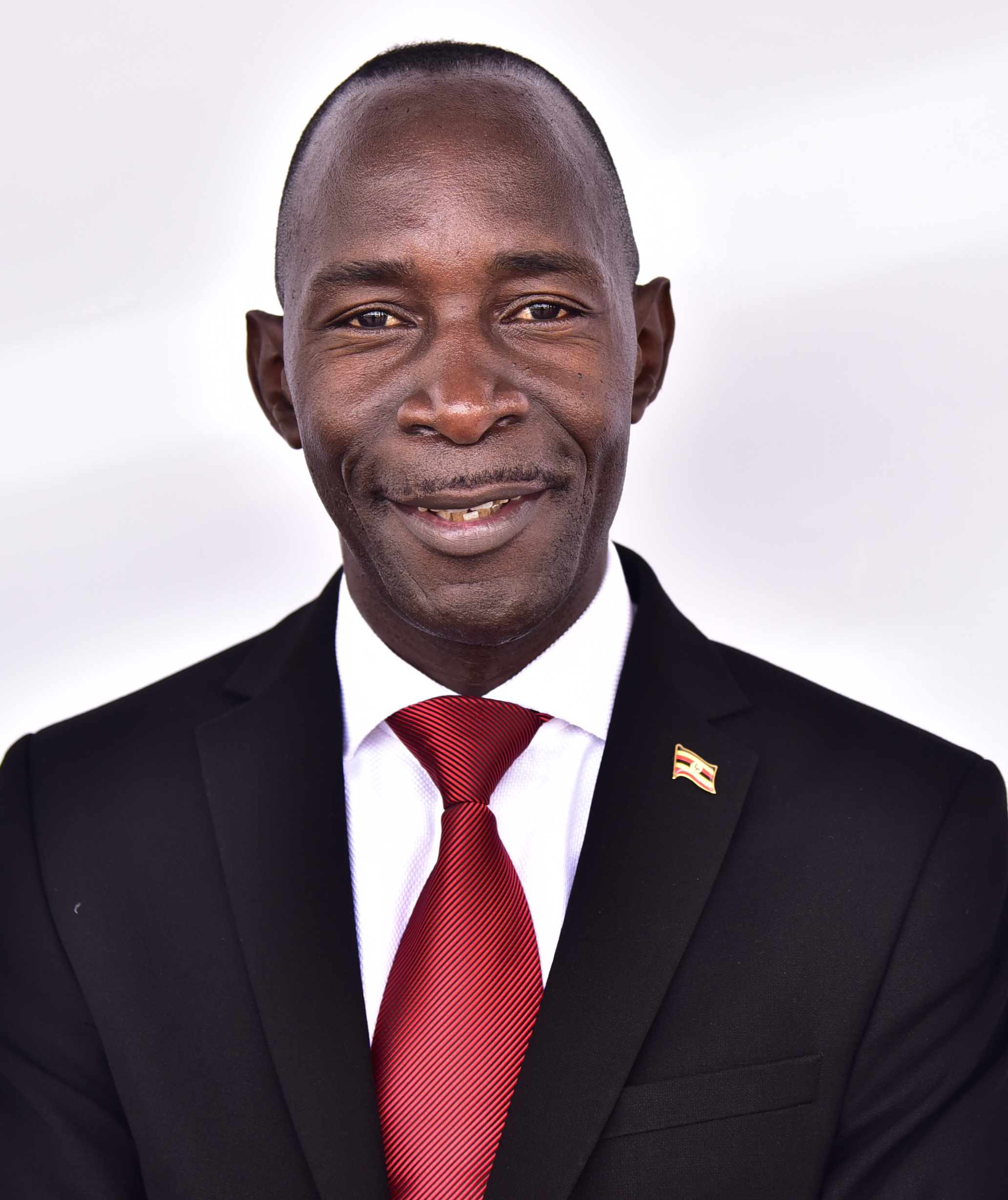
- Luttamaguzi (photo from Wikimedia Commons)

Former Member of Parliament of Uganda
- In office 2016–2026
- Succeeded by: Charles Nsereko Basajjassubi
- Constituency: Nakaseke South County

Personal details
- Born: Paulson Luttamaguzi; 25 December 1979 (age 46) Nakaseke District, Uganda
- Party: National Unity Platform (since 2025)
- Other political affiliations: Democratic Party (until 2025)
- Education: Makerere University (Bachelor of Commerce)
- Occupation: Economist, politician

Paulson Kasana Semakula Luttamaguzi (born 25 December 1979) is a Ugandan politician and economist. He is a former Member of Parliament who represented Nakaseke South County from 2016 to 2026.

He was re-elected in the 2021 parliamentary election as a Democratic Party (DP) candidate. In April 2025, Daily Monitor reported that he had shifted allegiance from DP to the National Unity Platform.

In the January 2026 parliamentary elections, Charles Nsereko Basajjassubi of the National Resistance Movement was declared the winner for the Nakaseke South County seat with 30,279 votes, defeating the incumbent Paulson Kasana Semakula Luttamaguzi, who garnered 18,123 votes.

== Early life and education ==
Luttamaguzi was born in Nakaseke District on 25 December 1979. In a 2017 interview with The Observer, he said he attended Kitebi Primary School, briefly attended Jinja College, and then studied at Jinja Secondary School for O-level and Luweero Secondary School for A-level, before graduating with a Bachelor of Commerce from Makerere University. In the same interview, he identified his parents as Luttamaguzi Mukiibi and Cissy Nalunkuuma.

== Political career ==
=== Elections ===
In a 2020 profile ahead of the 2021 polls, Daily Monitor reported that he received 11,519 votes in 2016, narrowly defeating Denis Ssekabira (NRM), who got 11,157 votes.

In the 2021 election, Uganda Radio Network reported that he polled 26,089 votes, ahead of Charles Nsereko (9,836) and Stephen Mukiibi (280). New Vision later reported that he was sworn in for the 11th Parliament after retaining the seat.

Parliamentary elections
Year	Office	Party	Votes	Opponent(s) (votes)	Result
2016	MP, Nakaseke South County	Democratic Party	11,519	Denis Ssekabira (NRM) 11,157	Elected
2021	MP, Nakaseke South County	Democratic Party	26,089	Charles Nsereko (NRM) 9,836; Stephen Mukiibi 280	Re-elected

=== Party affiliation ===
Parliament’s official MPs database lists Luttamaguzi as a member of the Democratic Party (DP). In April 2025, Daily Monitor described him as having shifted allegiance from DP to the National Unity Platform (NUP).

Lutamaguzi contested again for the Nakaseke South parliamentary seat in the 2026 general election as the National Unity Platform flag bearer but was defeated by National Resistance Movement's Charles Kawuma Nsereko.

== Parliamentary work and public issues ==
=== Land disputes and evictions ===
In a 2020 report about the Nakaseke South contest ahead of the 2021 polls, Daily Monitor linked the constituency’s politics to land disputes and evictions, and quoted Luttamaguzi discussing land rights concerns and service delivery (roads, health and education).

=== Nakaseke tomato processing plant ===
In March 2017, Uganda Radio Network reported on a visit by Parliament’s Committee on Government Assurances and Implementation to the Bulemezi Food Processing Plant in Nakaseke District, where Luttamaguzi (as area MP) questioned why the plant was out of production after it had been established as part of a government initiative. In January 2021, Daily Monitor reported that he and other leaders raised concerns about the collapse of the tomato factory and the losses faced by farmers who had grown tomatoes expecting a ready market.

== Views and public statements ==
In a 2017 interview with The Observer, he described himself as “politically romantic” and said he intended to run for president in 2031.

== Personal life ==
Parliament’s official MPs database lists him as married.

== See also ==
- Parliament of Uganda
- Nakaseke District
- Democratic Party (Uganda)
- National Unity Platform
