= DOCB =

DOCB may refer to:

- Dictionary of Canadian Biography
- Drugs and Organised Crime Bureau of the Irish police
- Dr. Obote College Boroboro, a school in Uganda
- .docb, a Microsoft Word file extension
