= Buganda Road Primary School =

Coordinates: 0.3227°N 32.5754°E

- Kampala; Uganda

Information
- Type: Public mixed primary school
- Established: 1933
- Oversight: Kampala Capital City Authority

Buganda Road Primary School is a public primary school located in Kampala, Uganda. Established in 1933 as Norman Godinho Primary School, it is one of Kampala's oldest educational institutions. Owned originally by Norman Godinho, a Goan entrepreneur who came to Uganda in 1906, the school and its property were later transferred, via ownership, to Kampala City Council and the Ministry of Education. The school has educated generations of Ugandans who went on to prominent careers. Godinho, also regarded then as the "father of Goan education in Uganda" is said to have donated the school to the community.

The school was the first Universal Primary Education (UPE) institution in Uganda to use an e‑learning system and was recognized as a pioneer in digital learning within the UPE programme.

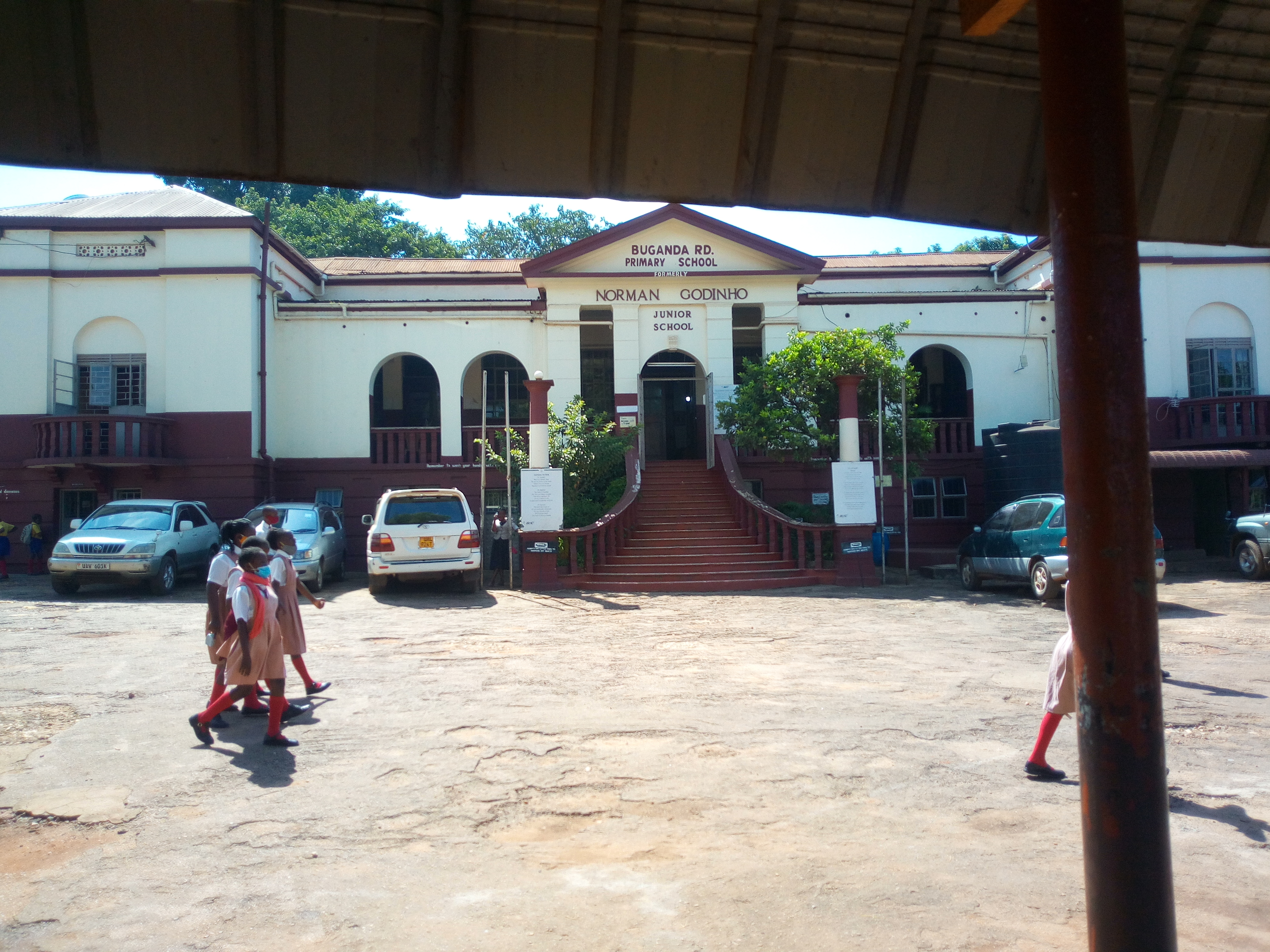
Buganda Road Primary School: The main entrance to the school administration building.

== History ==
Buganda Road Primary School, which opened in 1933 as Norman Godinho Primary School, was one of several properties owned by Goan entrepreneur, Norman Godinho.

According to The Observer, Godinho held major real estate in the city, including Speke Hotel, half of Nakasero Road, and most of the property along "Buganda Road between KPC and YMCA." His holdings included Norman Godinho Junior School, the institution that later became Buganda Road Primary School.

These properties, including the school, were later transferred ownership to the Kampala City Council and the Ministry of Education. The school remained for decades one of Kampala's leading elementary institutions until its conversion to a Universal Primary Education (UPE) school in 1996.

Despite undergoing later expansions, Buganda Road Primary School preserved many of the original architectural features and inscriptions.

In 1960, Joseph Almeida joined the school as a teacher and later became the headmaster, following the 1972 expulsion of Asians from Uganda. He led the school, as its headmaster, until 1994. He is credited with raising the school's academic standards and helping establish it as one of Uganda's leading primary institutions.

During this period (1972-1996), government-aided schools such as Buganda Road, Kitante, and Nakasero “produced most of Kampala’s crème de la crème in education,” according to educator Edward Kasole Bwerere.

The school had previously used the nearby former Norman Cinema, another Godinho property, for its music, dance and drama activities.

The school is reported to be the first Universal Primary Education (UPE) school in Uganda to implement an electronic learning system. The introduction of the digital system was to modernize methods of teaching and learning.

== Academics ==
Buganda Road Primary School is a government-aided, mixed, day and boarding school, offering elementary (primary) education, from grades 1–7. The curriculum is established by the National Curriculum Development Centre (NCDC).

== Co-curricular achievements ==
Buganda Road Primary School participates in music, dance and drama. In 2019, it won the National Primary Schools Music, Dance and Drama Competition, and in 2023 it retained the crown.

== Notable faculty ==
- Joseph Almeida (educator)

== Notable alumni ==
- Azawi – singer-songwriter.
- Ivan Edwards – physician, USAF flight surgeon, poet.
- Andrew Kambugu – physician, infectious disease specialist.
- Sheila Mwine Kabaije – educator, politician.
- Mr. Lee B2C – musician.
- Mariam Ndagire – singer, actress, filmmaker.
- St. Nelly-Sade – rapper.
- Muhammad Nsereko – politician.
- Judy Rugasira Kyanda – Real estate executive.
- Asha Naava Zziwa – musician/songwriter, businesswoman.

== See also ==
- Education in Uganda
- Kampala Capital City Authority
- List of schools in Uganda
- Indians in Uganda
- Joseph Almeida (educator)
