= Yemisi Akinbobola =

Nigerian media entrepreneur

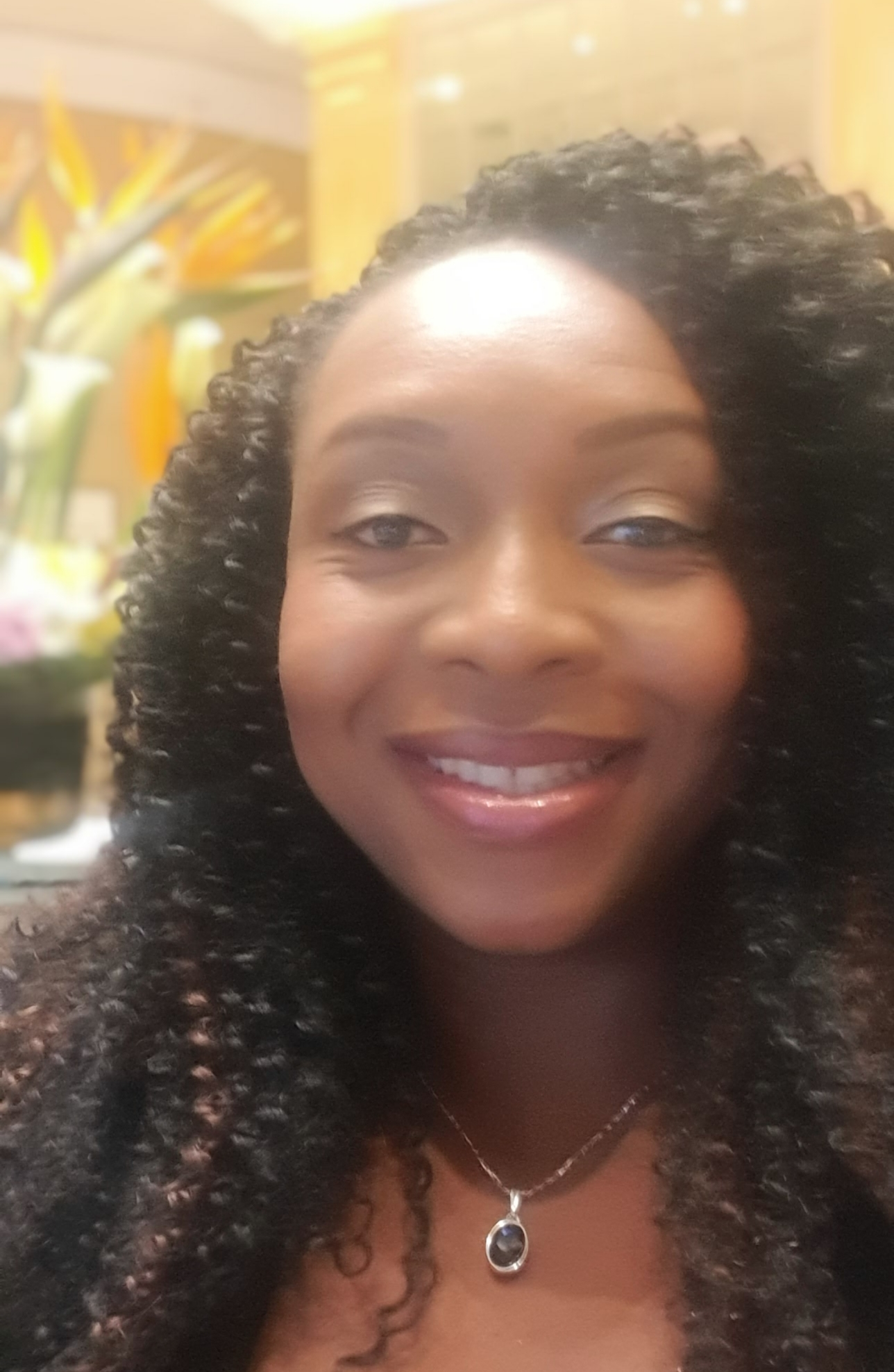
- Education: University of Maiduguri; Birmingham City University
- Occupations: Media Entrepreneur; Journalist
- Title: Journalist
- Awards: African Journalist Award 2016

Yemisi Akinbobola is a Nigerian media entrepreneur, academic, and co-winner of the CNN African Journalist Award 2016 in sports reporting. She is the co-founder of African Women in the Media group, which was established to foster the needs of female African media content producers. She studied Creative Arts at the University of Maiduguri and had her Masters in Media Production from Birmingham City University, where she subsequently gained her PhD in Media and Cultural Studies. She later became a visiting lecturer and researcher at the same university. She completed an internship with CNN, and during this period she set up IQ4News. The news platform was recognized for an investigation into the trafficking of young, West African soccer players by fake agents. She formed Stringers Africa—an organization that started from her difficulties recruiting African journalist for her freelance job. Akinbobola has freelanced for publications like United Nations Africa Renewal magazine.

== Background and education ==
Yemisi is a Nigerian born media entrepreneur and the co-founder of African Women in the Media from Akure, Ondo state. She had her first degree in Creative Arts from the University of Maiduguri. She obtained her Master in Media and Cultural Studies and PhD in Media and Cultural Studies at the University of Birmingham.

== Career ==
Yemisi was co-winner of the CNN African Journalist Award 2016 for "sport reporting" at the "CNN Multichoice African Journalist of the Year Award" in Johannesburg. The award was jointly won with Ogechi Ekeanyanwu, a reporter for Premium Newspaper, and Paul Bradshaw of IQ4News. The award was made for her Investigative journalism of fake sports agents and their impact on Nigerian players. She has worked as a freelance writer for the United Nations' Africa Renewal magazine. She is the founder of Stringer Africa, a media organization focusing on bridging the existing gap of freelance journalists in Africa media industry. In 2010, Yemisi founded IQ4NeWs to create a platform for African journalists, bloggers, citizens and experts to tell stories from an African perspective.
