= Adoa =

Adoa or ADOA can refer to:

- Hellen Adoa, Ugandan parliamentarian
- Adore (Miho Nakayama song) (Adoa), 1999 single
- Anglican Diocese of Accra, diocese in Accra, Ghana
- Arizona Department of Administration, part of the Government of Arizona
- Autosomal dominant optic atrophy, autosomally inherited optic nerve condition
