= St. Francis School for the Blind Madera =

Special needs school in Soroti City, Uganda

St. Francis School for the Blind–Madera
- Madera; Soroti City; Uganda

Information
- Type: Special needs school
- Established: 1955
- School district: Soroti District
- Gender: Co-educational
- Language: English
- Campus type: Boarding and day school

St. Francis School for the Blind–Madera is a special needs primary school located in Madera, Soroti City, in Eastern Uganda.

== See also ==
- Uganda School for the Deaf
- Special education
- Braille literacy
