= Joseph Almeida (educator) =

Ugandan educator

- Joseph Almeida
- Born: March 17, 1925; Entebbe, Uganda Protectorate
- Died: June 4, 2017 (aged 92); Goa, India
- Education: Karnatak University
- Occupation: Educator
- Years active: 1957–2017
- Known for: Headmaster of Buganda Road Primary School; Founder of Lohana Academy; Contributor to Uganda’s primary education system

Joseph Almeida (1925–2017), also known as Jos Almeida in some of his social circles, was a Ugandan educator of Goan descent, best known for his leadership of Buganda Road Primary School in Kampala, Uganda, where he served as headmaster for 22 years (1972–1994). His tenure coincided with a period of upheaval, including the 1972 expulsion of Asians from Uganda, during which many of his colleagues were forced to leave the country. Almeida remained in the country, following the expulsion, and helped guide the school through the national transitions. He was widely described in the Ugandan press as an influential figure in the country’s primary education system.

He started his teaching career at Shimoni Primary School and East Kololo Primary School before joining Norman Godinho Primary School (later renamed Buganda Road Primary School) in 1960. His headmastership, from 1972 to 1994, is credited with strengthening academic standards and shaping generations of pupils.

After retiring from government service, Almeida founded Lohana Academy and helped establish the Uganda branch of LARCH International, contributing to both educational development and disability support initiatives.

== Early life and education ==
Almeida was born in 1925 in Entebbe, Uganda, to Asian Goan parents. His father, X. E. Almeida, immigrated to Uganda in 1910 and worked for the Department of Works (under the British colonial administration).

He attended St. Theresa Primary School in Entebbe before moving with his parents to India in 1946. He studied at Karnatak University, earning a Bachelor of Science degree in 1953 and a Bachelor of Education degree in 1955.

== Career ==
=== Shimoni, East Kololo, and Norman Godinho primary schools ===
Almeida returned to Uganda in 1958 and began teaching at Shimoni Primary School. He then taught briefly at East Kololo Primary School. In 1960 he joined Norman Godinho Primary School (now Buganda Road Primary School).

He became headmaster in 1972, following the expulsion of Asians from Uganda. During this period, most of the Indian teachers at the school were forced to leave, leaving only two who remained in their posts, Mr. Dias and Almeida. He led the school until his retirement from government service in 1994. Contemporary accounts credit him with guiding the school through major national transitions, including periods of teacher shortages. He helped shape the school's overall academic reputation.

A 2003 New Vision feature described him as “married to primary education,” noting his 45‑year teaching career and his influence on the school meals program.

=== LARCH International ===
In 1993 he helped establish the Uganda branch of LARCH‑International, a Canadian‑based NGO, focused on rehabilitating people with disabilities.

=== Lohana Academy ===
In 1994, Almeida founded Lohana Academy, a school established in partnership with the Lohana (Asian) community in Kampala. The Academy offered ongoing education to the community and received formal recognition and commendation from the city.

== Personal ==
Almeida loved playing competitive bridge for intellectual reasons. He relished mangos and local Ugandan food.

Almeida never married or had any biological children.

== Retirement and death ==
Almeida ultimately retired and left Uganda for India. He died in Goa, India, in 2017 at the age of 92.

== Legacy ==
The Independent described Almeida as “one of the most respected educationists in Uganda,” highlighting his influence on primary education. In 2017, following his death, alumni from the Class of 1983 donated 21 computers to Buganda Road Primary School and named the computer laboratory in his honor.

Frank Katoora, founder of Tender Talents, later recalled developing his educational approach “in the days Joseph Almeida was headmaster," citing Almeida's influence.

A colleague, quoted in New Vision, referred to Almeida as "Kampala’s father of primary school education," reflecting the impact he held over the city’s educational sector.

== See also ==
Buganda Road Primary School
