= Teacher's Monthly =

Teacher's Monthly is a South African-based web site that provides educational resources, lessons, videos, news and articles for teachers and educators. Teacher's Monthly started in January 2007 as an email newsletter that quickly gained popularity within the South African teaching community.

In August 2009, Teacher's Monthly launched its web site and online resource directory aimed at equipping teachers with free tools and resources, as well as providing academic-based articles and a platform for teachers to collaborate and share ideas. The site is run by a team of volunteers that include teachers, school principals, as well as business people who share insights on education in South Africa. Chief contributors include the magazine editor Adrian Marnewick, ex-principal and national school evaluator Dr Malcolm Venter, and school principal Lunko Limakatso Rapudungoane.

Teacher's Monthly is owned by EvaluNet, an educational software development company, and is supported by major educational publishing companies including Macmillan Publishers South Africa and Maskew Miller Longman.

Teacher's Monthly is used by 11,000 teachers and students and has over 3,000 subscribers.

== Affiliations ==
Teacher's Monthly is affiliated to and co-authors content for Teaching English Today, a project of the English Academy of Southern Africa - the only academy for the English language in the world.
