= Ariyike Akinbobola =

Nigerian actress

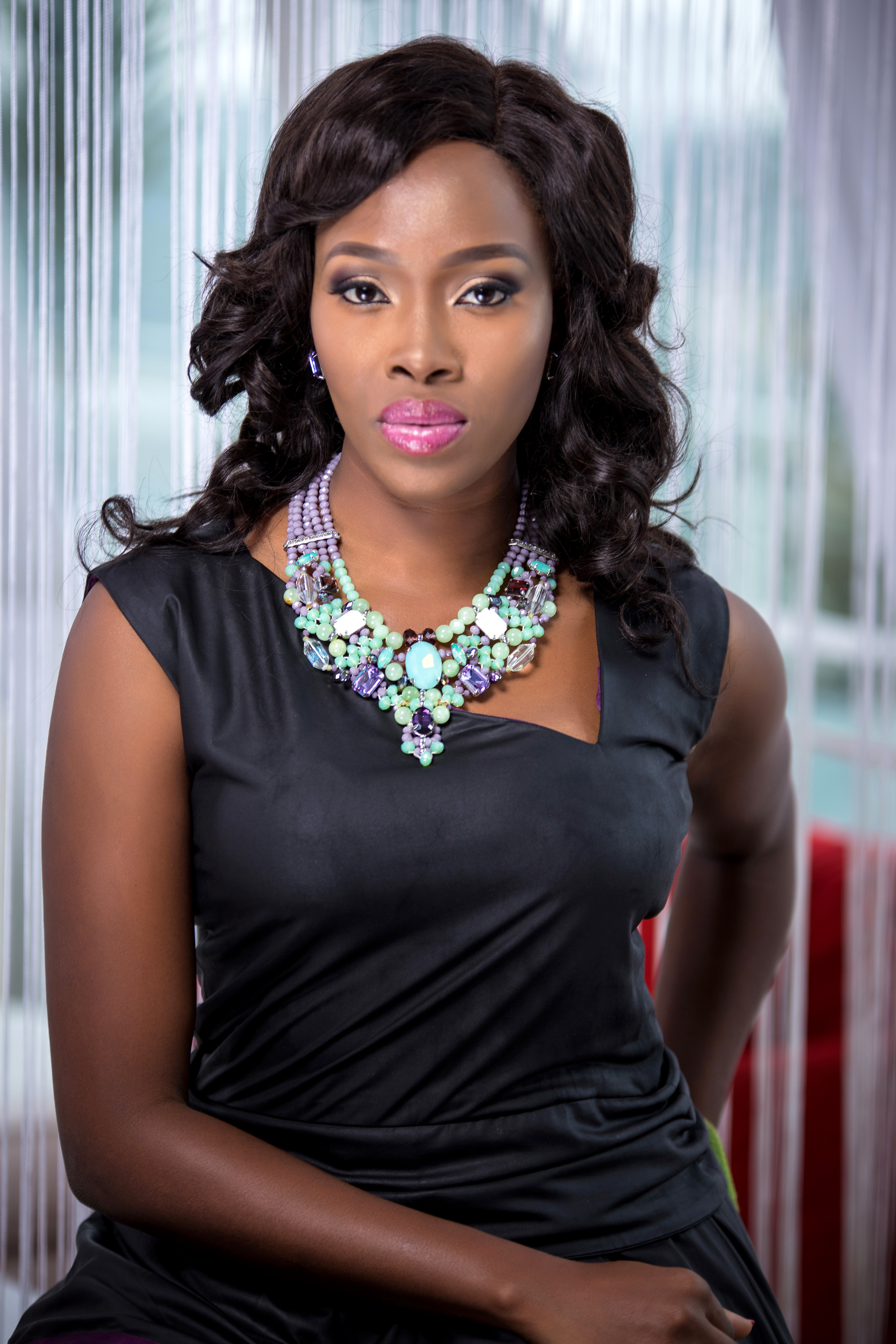
- Akinbobola in 2014
- Born: Ariyike Lawal; 25 April 1982 (age 44); Lagos, Nigeria
- Education: London Academy of Media, Film and television
- Occupations: Lawyer, author, model, presenter, actress, tv producer, tv personality, talk show host, event host, blogger
- Years active: 2011–present
- Website: reflectionswithariyike.blogspot.com

Ariyike Lawal-Akinbobola (born 25 April 1982), professionally known as Ariyike Akinbobola, is a Canada-based Nigerian author, television presenter, talk show host, model, blogger, trained lawyer and occasional Actor. Since 2011, she has worked as an associate producer and TV presenter for Spice TV a fashion and lifestyle channel on the DSTV platform. She hosted Spice TV's flagship programme 'On the Couch' and in addition she has produced and presented the fashion news and has as well presented other TV Shows including Sugar and Spice, Urban Spice, Instant Beauty Queen and Project Swan. She also presented Spice TV's gadget show, Spice Toys. Her children's book, the Beautifully Coloured, has been certified a bestseller on Amazon. In 2026, she was appointed as the Head of Corporate Communications at Ntel.

== Early life ==
Akinbobola was born at St. Nicholas hospital Lagos, Nigeria and is the fifth of six children of Mojeed Adewale and Ladun Lawal (née Ojutalayo). She is of Yoruba descent. Her father, Mojeed Adewale, studied economics at the Obafemi Awolowo University, Ile-Ife. He was a civil servant with the Federal Government of Nigeria and worked in several capacities in various Federal Ministries, retiring at the rank of Director of Fiscal Budget in the Federal Ministry of Finance. Her mother Ladun Lawal, is a titled Chief in Nigeria with the moniker 'The Yeye-oba of Iyanfoworogi-Ife', she is a Pharmacist and runs a small scale pharmaceutical manufacturing company in Ile-Ife, Osun State, with a branch in Lagos State.

Akinbobola's love for entertainment began when she was a little child. She and her siblings used to play dress up and choreograph musical performances at family functions. She attended Federal Home Science Primary School, Ikoyi, Lagos where she was a member of the Brownies Society and when she got into high school at Queen's College, Lagos, she was a constant face on stage at variety shows and school award ceremonies. Due to her jovial and friendly nature, she won the award for 'Miss Friendly' for her class, during their class of 1998 final year award night. Afterwards, she proceeded to the University of Lagos, Akoka to study law.

In 2006, she obtained an LLB in Law after which she proceeded to the Nigerian Law School, Lagos where she obtained a BL in Law.

Akinbobola who was very close to her father suffered a huge loss when her father passed on in January 2010 after battling with Parkinson's disease for over 15 years.

In 2011, after practising law for a few years, she obtained a diploma in Television Presenting at the London Academy of Media, Film and Television.

== Career ==
In 2010, Akinbobola began recording episodes of her own TV Show ‘Reflections with Ariyike which can be watched on her YouTube page "Ariyike weekly". In 2011 she auditioned for a job as a presenter on a new Satellite TV Station – Spice TV and in June 2011, Akinbobola got employed by Spice TV as a TV presenter.

As a TV personality and Red carpet Host, Akinbobola has interviewed a number of Nigerian and international celebrities as well as diplomats. She has interviewed Dr. Andrew Pocock, the British High commissioner to Nigeria, Mr. Mike Purves, Director Trade and Investment for UK Trade and Investment, Pauline Long, founder of the BEFFTA Awards, Mrs. Bunmi Oke, President of the Association of Advertising Agencies of Nigeria (AAAN), American Singer-songwriter Carl Thomas, Otunba Niyi Babade of CNN and a lot of Nigerian entrepreneurs. In 2013, she hosted the red carpet at the Nigerian-British chamber of commerce Presidential ball.

In 2013, Akinbobola made her acting debut in the Nigerian hit TV series "Lekki Wives" alongside Kiki Omeili and Katherine Obiang, she also made an appearance on the series "Aunty Caro's bar". Akinbobola co-hosted the Lagos Countdown crossover concert alongside Ikponmwosa Osakioduwa and Quest (in 2012) as well as Gbenga Adeyinka and Ill-Rhymz (in 2013). The event is organised by the Lagos state government and is broadcast live across Africa. It is similar to the annual Times Square, New Year Countdown event.

Akinbobola is also a guest writer for one of Nigeria's foremost blogsites "Bella Naija", where she writes motivational/relationship stories about issues that affect Africans. She has her own segment called "Ariyike writes". She also runs her personal blog www.reflectionswithariyike.blogspot.com.

In 2022, Akinbobola began hosting a book-reading family picnic in Ontario Canada tagged ‘Beautifully Coloured’. The picnic promotes book reading, recitation of positive affirmations, as well as draw attention to issues of child trafficking and other vices. Her picture book on kindness, also called Beautifully Coloured is an Amazon bestseller.

== Personal life ==
Ariyike Akinbobola is married with three sons.

== Charity work ==
On 8 December 2013, Akinbobola organised her first annual charity Christmas party where donations from her, her friends, family members and brands were made to 9 charitable organisations. Representatives from NGOs, notable celebrities and media personalities were also present at the event. The 9 charities that benefited are Earths Haven foundation, Slumdwellers Liberation forum, Lots charity, Green pastures kiddies, Haven for the Nigerian child, Vocal Slender's Ghetto Love project, Arrows of God orphanage, Society for love and social justice, Campaign against Ignorance and illiteracy. Ariyike also created awareness for a website that supports and creates awareness for charities, the site is called www.234give.com.

In December 2012, as part of an Edutainment secondary school tour organised by Van Cliff and iCirculate, Akinbobola and a group of artistes visited different secondary schools to motivate the students and give them belief in Nigeria. They also enlightened the students about the advantages and disadvantages of social media and encouraged the students about the importance of education when you work in the entertainment Industry. In 2013, a second season of the tour was organised.

In September 2013, Akinbobola partnered with Vocal Slender's Back to school ghetto love project to donate and source for donations of School bags and school supplies to over 500 Ajegunle (a slum in Lagos State, Nigeria) children who were going to resume school. Akinbobola has also partnered with Pink Heritage Company, an organisation involved in the creation of awareness for sexual abuse in teenage girls and counselling for female students of secondary schools who have been sexually abused.

In October 2012, Akinbobola began organising a monthly event called "Best of Both Worlds" networking event (BOBW), where she gives upcoming fashion designers, artists/talent, poets, comedians, writers, media personalities, DJs and entertainers the opportunity to showcase their talent and she also supports and creates awareness for one charitable organisation at every edition of BOBW.

== Awards and recognition ==
In 2012, Akinbobola was awarded the ‘Most Promising/Young TV Presenter’ of the year at the Nigerian Broadcasters Merit Awards (NBMA), Lagos, Nigeria, and was further nominated in 2012 and 2013 for the 'Most Popular TV Presenter' at the Nigerian Broadcasters Merit Awards, Lagos, Nigeria. Based on her achievements in 2012, Akinbobola was featured in TW Magazine's January 2013 edition as one of the Top 13 Young, Hardworking Ladies to look out for in 2013.

In 2013, Akinbobola was awarded with the Humanitarian award for excellence from Magic City's Club Flames Merit Awards 2013, Lagos, Nigeria for promoting, supporting and encouraging upcoming talent.

In 2014, Akinbobola was nominated for the International Humanitarian of the Year at the Women4Africa Award, which held in London. Akinbobola was also nominated for the 2014 Exquisite Lady of the Year (ELOY) Awards, where she was nominated for TV Presenter of the Year.

In 2021, she received the 2021 Women of Inspiration™ Immigrant Leader Award by the Universal Women's Network in Canada.

Year	Event	Prize	Recipient	Result
2012	Nigerian Broadcasters Merit Awards (NBMA)	‘Most Promising/Young TV Presenter’	Ariyike Akinbobola	Won
2012	Nigerian Broadcasters Merit Awards (NBMA)	'Most Popular TV Presenter'	Ariyike Akinbobola	Nominated
2013	Nigerian Broadcasters Merit Awards (NBMA)	'Most Popular TV Presenter'	Ariyike Akinbobola	Nominated
2013	Magic City's Club Flames Merit Awards 2013	Humanitarian Award for Excellence	Ariyike Akinbobola	Won
2014	Women4Africa Awards	International Humanitarian of the Year	Ariyike Akinbobola	Nominated
2014	Exquisite Lady of the Year (ELOY) Awards	TV Presenter of the Year	Ariyike Akinbobola	Nominated
