= Serere Township Secondary School =

Location
- Plot 18-34 Block J Serere Township; P.O Box 732 Soroti; Uganda

Information
- Religious affiliation: Christian
- Established: 5 January 1998
- School district: Serere
- School number: PSS/A/36
- Gender: Mixed
- Accreditation: Uganda National Examination Board
- Website: www.townshipss.org/index.html

Serere Township Secondary School is a government sponsored, private coeducational secondary school in Serere, Eastern Uganda. The school caters for both boarding and day pupils. The lower secondary provides 4 years of schooling at the end of which students sit Uganda Certificate of Education (O-level) exams in up to 8 subjects. The upper secondary provides a further 2 years of schooling at the end of which students sit Uganda Advanced Certificate of Education (A-level) exams in up to 3 subjects.

== Curriculum ==
The school curriculum includes:

- Physics
- Chemistry
- Biology
- English Language
- Mathematics
- Christian Religious Education
- Geography
- History
- Business Subjects
- Computer Studies

== Universal Secondary Education ==
The school participates in the Universal Secondary Education scheme whereby students who achieve specific grades in each of the four primary school-leaving exams study for free, and the Ugandan government pays the school an annual grant of USh 41,000/= per eligible student.

== Universal Post Ordinary Level Education and Training ==
The school participates in the Universal Post Ordinary Level Education and Training (UPOLET) scheme whereby students who achieve specific grades in three O-level exams study at A-level for free, and the Ugandan government pays the school an annual grant of 80,000/= per eligible student.

== Connecting Classrooms programme ==
The school took part in the British Council's Connecting Classrooms programme between July 2009 and March 2012. The programme linked schools and education authorities in Katine sub-county and Soroti District in Uganda with schools in Sheffield, England. The programme aimed "to challenge stereotypical attitudes among young people in Africa and the UK, broaden the international view of young people in both continents and develop the skills of pupils and teachers."

== See also ==
- Education in Uganda
- List of schools in Uganda
