= Kampala School for Physically Handicapped =

Coordinates: 0.3163°N 32.5572°E

- Kampala; Uganda

Information
- Established: 1968
- Website: ksph.org

The Kampala School for the Physically Handicapped is a school in Kampala, Uganda, for people with disabilities, with a specialty in children. It was established in 1968 by parents of children with cerebral palsy.

The school is under the leadership of Joy Mwesigwa, who has led the institution for at least 25 years. The school provides rehabilitation services to students and is equipped with a vocational section to teach the children sewing skills.

The school is supervised by the Ministry of Education and Sports, the line ministry responsible for accrediting learning institutions in Uganda.

== Location ==
The school is located along Balintuma road, in Mengo, Kampala.

== See also ==
- National Union of Persons with Disability in Uganda
- National Union of Women with Disabilities of Uganda
- Disability in Uganda
