= Bugulumbya Secondary School =

Secondary school in Kamuli District, Uganda

Location
- Busobya, Kamuli District; Eastern Region, Uganda; Uganda
- 0.80792°N 33.20942°E

Information
- Type: Secondary school
- Grades: S1–S6
- Enrollment: 668 (574 O-level, 94 A-level; 2020)

Bugulumbya Secondary School is a secondary school in Busobya, Kamuli District, in the Eastern Region, Uganda. It became known nationally through the NEPAD e-Schools Initiative.

== History ==
=== NEPAD e-Schools Initiative ===
In June 2005, a consortium led by Hewlett-Packard announced plans to launch Uganda’s first NEPAD “e-school” at Bugulumbya Secondary School, following a World Economic Forum Africa Summit announcement in Cape Town. Africa Renewal later reported that the school “made headlines” in July 2005 as the first institution in Uganda to receive computers under the NEPAD e-school initiative.

Bugulumbya Secondary School was one of Uganda’s demonstration schools in the NEPAD e-Schools project. The 2007 public report on the demonstration project lists Bugulumbya Secondary School as a “Launch School” under the HP consortium, alongside other Ugandan demo schools such as Kabale Secondary School, Masaka Secondary School, Kyambogo College School, Bukuya Secondary School, and St. Andrew Kaggwa Senior Secondary School (Kasaala).

== Infrastructure and ICT ==
Africa Renewal reported constraints typical of rural schools at the time, including limited grid electricity and reliance on a generator, as well as phased delivery of ICT equipment during the pilot period. The report also described students using computers and the internet for learning and information access at the school.

== Enrolment ==
The school takes students from S1 – S6. The school has a roughly even split between girls and boys in S1 – S4, but males outnumber females by a ratio of approximately 4:1 in S5 and S6.

In April 2007, Africa Renewal reported an enrolment of about 300 students at the school during the NEPAD e-school pilot period.

A Uganda Ministry of Education and Sports school grant list (SEC-BY-SCHOOL, 2020) lists Bugulumbya Secondary School with 574 O-level learners and 94 A-level learners (total 668).

== See also ==
- NEPAD_e-school_program
- Masaka Secondary School
- Education in Uganda
- Kamuli District
