= St John Fisher School =

St John Fisher School or St John Fisher College may refer to:

== Secondary and high schools ==
- The John Fisher School in Purley, Surrey, England
- St John Fisher Catholic College in Newcastle-under-Lyme, Staffordshire, England
- St John Fisher Catholic High School, Harrogate in North Yorkshire, England
- St John Fisher Catholic High School, Peterborough in Cambridgeshire, England
- St John Fisher Catholic High School, Wigan in Greater Manchester, England
- St John Fisher Catholic School in Chatham, Kent, England
- St John Fisher Catholic Voluntary Academy in Dewsbury, West Yorkshire, England
- Ss John Fisher and Thomas More Roman Catholic High School in Colne, Lancashire
- St. John Fisher Ibanda Secondary School in Ibanda, Uganda

== Higher education ==
- St. John Fisher College, private liberal arts college in Rochester, New York, United States
- St. John Fisher College (University of Tasmania) in Tasmania, Australia
- St. John Fisher Seminary Residence in Stamford, Connecticut, United States

== Other ==
- St. John Fisher College, New York (CDP), census-designated place encompassing the St. John Fisher College campus
