= Infectious Diseases Institute =

Ugandan medical organization

Infectious Diseases Institute - Makerere University
- Founded: 2002
- Location: Kampala, Uganda
- Key people: Andrew Kambugu (Executive Director); Samuel Abimerech Luboga (Chairperson)
- Revenue: $60.1m (2023)
- Employees: 1000+ (June 2021)

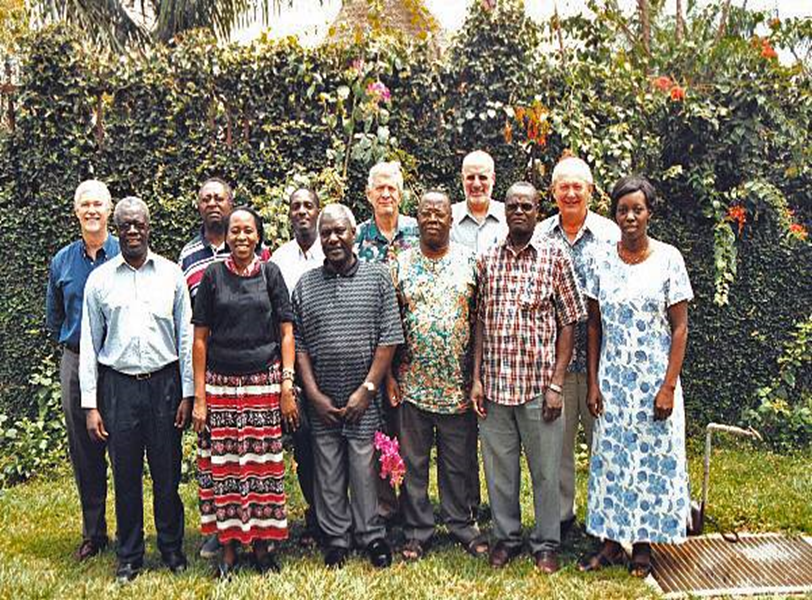
Original members of the IDI at Makere. From left to right: Tom Quinn, Nelson Sewankambo, David Serwadda, Phillipa Musoke, Moses Kamya, Edward Mbidde, Allan Ronald, Fred Wabwire Mangen, Jerry Ellner, Elly Katibira, Merle Sande, Harriet Mayanja-Kizza

The Infectious Diseases Institute (IDI) is a Ugandan not-for-profit organization established within Makerere University which aims to strengthen health systems in Africa, with a strong emphasis on infectious diseases, through research and capacity development. In pursuit of its mission, both in Uganda and in Sub-Saharan Africa, IDI provides care to People Living with HIV (PLHIV) and other infectious diseases, builds capacity among healthcare workers through training and ongoing support, maintains a focus on prevention, and carries out relevant research.

== Background ==
IDI was created in 2002 as an academic public/private partnership consisting of the Makerere University School of Medicine, the Mulago National Referral Hospital, the Ministry of Health (Uganda), and Pfizer Inc. with the Pfizer Foundation, together with a group of infectious diseases experts from Uganda and North America named the Academic Alliance for AIDS Care and Prevention in Africa (AA). The Academic Alliance Foundation was formed in 2003 and was later renamed the Accordia Global Health Foundation in 2008.

Infectious Diseases Institute Limited (IDIL) (operating as IDI) is registered as a non-profit company limited by guarantee without share capital. In 2004, Makerere University became the sole guarantor of IDIL. In 2009, with the creation of the College of Health Sciences at Makerere University, IDI became an integral part of the School of Medicine within the College. IDI also maintains a strong relationship with the Ministry of Health, Uganda through its support of Regional Referral Hospitals and other key Ministry of Health functions and facilities.

== Scope of Work ==
With a focus on infectious diseases, IDI operates in five main areas:

1. Prevention, Care and Treatment: IDI supports over 100,000 HIV+ people across Uganda in both urban and rural settings in Uganda (both directly, and in partnership with government and non-government health facilities). This translates into about 10% of the national effort. Of the 100,000 people living with HIV, IDI Outreach department cares for over 90,000. Additionally, IDI provides extensive prevention services such as voluntary medical male circumcision and has circumcised over 230,000 men, as of June 2016. as well as Prevention of Mother to Child HIV Transmission. As a national referral centre, IDI manages complicated HIV cases.
2. Training and Capacity Development: Each year, IDI trains approximately 1,500 health care workers from across Africa in HIV/AIDS and TB co-infection, malaria, lab services, pharmacy, systems strengthening (data management, monitoring and evaluation, grants management), and research capacity building. As of June 2016, IDI has trained over 19,000 participants, 11,844 queries have been answered through the toll free Advanced Treatment Information Center (ATIC) since 2004 and IDI has also provided technical assistance across 80 districts in Uganda.
3. Research: Since 2001, IDI has published over 500 research articles in peer-reviewed journals. As of June 2016, IDI had 47 active research grants including 13 clinical trials, 17 observational studies and 17 capacity building projects.
4. Laboratory Services: In 2005, the joint Makerere University-Johns Hopkins University (MU-JHU) "MUJHU" laboratory moved to IDI. The Makerere University & Johns Hopkins lab, is College of American Pathologists (CAP) certified laboratory “MUJHU” lab recognized by the American Food and Drug Administration. IDI also manages a translational laboratory in partnership with University of California, San Francisco (UCSF) and other international partners. Every year "MUJHU" lab conducts approximately 160,000 tests. The MU-JHU laboratory at IDI is the first laboratory outside of the United States to be recognized by the Medical Laboratory Observer's Laboratory of the Year Award. As of June 2016, both the core and central labs has tested over 117,000 units.
5. Outreach: In partnership with the CDC, ViiV, USAID, Gates Foundation, and others, IDI programs operate in 70% of Ugandan districts.

Key IDI programmatic outputs by December 2016 include:

- Over 104,293 PLHIV cared for at IDI and 90,000 of which are cared for through the IDI Outreach program and partnerships
- 2,407,997 people counselled and tested for HIV through IDI Outreach
- 244,450 men circumcised through IDI
- 22,522 people from 27 African countries trained through IDI
- Over 45 research projects completed and over 500 research articles published in peer-reviewed journals
- Over 118 Masters students and 10 Phd students successfully supported to graduate from a range of institutions within and outside Uganda.

In support of the above areas of activity, IDI maintains transparent financial and general management systems which undergo rigorous internal and external audits annually.

== Awards ==
- African Society for Laboratory Medicine (ASLM) Best Practice in Laboratory Award (2012), awarded to the MU-JHU/IDI Core Laboratory
- The African Network for Drugs and Diagnostics Innovation (ANDI) Center of Excellence Innovation Award (2011), funded through the United Nations Economic Commission for Africa (UNECA)
- Medical Laboratory Observer's Laboratory of the Year Award (2nd runner up, 2008)
