= Saint Katherine Secondary School =

Ugandan government-aided boarding school

- Lira; Uganda

Information
- Type: Secondary school
- Religious affiliation: Anglican
- Established: 1956
- Founder: Keith Russell
- Headmaster: Okuja John
- Sports: Football, athletics
- Nickname: SK

St. Katherine Secondary School is a government aided girls' boarding "O" and "A" level school located in Boroboro, Northern Region, Uganda, 8 kilometres (5.0 mi) from Lira. The school covers approximately 14 hectares (35 acres), and is about 2 kilometres (1.2 mi) off the main Lira – Soroti road. It is registered by the Ministry of Education and Sports as a government-aided school with Education Management Information System number of 1866. The name originated from Catherine of Alexandria who was born in 287 and died in 305 AD.

== Background ==
The school started in 1958 with only 45 students as a community school. It was the first girls' secondary school established in Uganda. Founders include Nyankori, the Reverend Canon Samson Obura and the Reverend Canon Leoben Ogwal. It was founded as a junior school for girls, and was also the first of its kind in Lango as a whole. It had two wings, boys' and girls', which were located on the east and west of the school respectively. The motion to open the school was elucidated in a Mbale Synod meeting (where the diocesan headquarters are located), by Keith Russell, the bishop of Northern Uganda from 1961 to 1964.

In 1975, education minister Abu Mayanja passed the order that the two wings be separated into Boroboro Secondary school (now called Dr. Obote College), headed by M. Sakwa, and St. Katherine Secondary School, headed by Okuja John. The first staff members at the school were Omara John, Gertrude Ogwal Agea, Jacinta Abok, Edisa Nekyon, Esther Angulo, Jane, and Ruth Odongo.

In 2017, Saint Katherine Old Girls' Association and the Board of Governor allocated funds for constructing a storyed student dormitory. The school offered a bid for the construction and the condition was that the bidder should pay a nonrefundable fee of Uganda shillings.200,000.

By the time school opened, there were only 45 students. Later the population rose; in 2024, it had over 1,000 students. This caused facilities like classrooms to be limited, since students started using classrooms as dormitories. The increase in population was due to the good performance displayed by the 2023 and 2022 candidatures, when 80 and 40 received first grades respectively. The school is currently headed by Madam Margaret Akello.

In 2022, the school signed a memorandum of understanding with the Association of Volunteers International Services, an Italian non-profit organization. The organization implemented 73 million Ugandan shillings, though they promised to be given 43 million per year.

As one of the school that a junior school and gained experienced through lasting for more decades, its population grew and in 2024, hundreds of the students are reported to slept classrooms due to inequate facilities.

== See also ==
- Dr. Obote College
