= Higher Education Students' Financing Board =

Students Loan

Higher Education Students’ Financing Board (HESFB) is a corporate body established by the act of the Ugandan parliament, number 2 of 2014, to provide loans and scholarship to students in Uganda to pursue higher education.

== Eligibility ==
Applicants must be Ugandan, they must been accepted into a recognized educational institution and they must be unable to afford tuition and other financial requirements.
