= Kisoga, Mukono =

- Location in Uganda; Placement on map is approximate
- Coordinates: 00°15′10″N 32°49′02″E
- Country: Uganda
- Region: Central Region of Uganda
- District: Mukono District
- Municipality: Kisoga
- County: Kyaggwe
- Elevation: 3,810 ft (1,160 m)

Kisoga is a town in Mukono District in Central Uganda.

== Location. ==
It is located approximately 15 kilometres (9.3 mi), by road, southeast of Mukono (2014 pop. 161,996), the nearest large urban centre and the location of the district headquarters. The coordinates of Kisoga are: 0°15'10.0"N, 32°49'02.0"E (Latitude:0.252778; Longitude:32.817222).

== Points of interest ==
These are some of the points of interest in or near Kisoga:

- the offices of Kisoga Town Council
- Kisoga Central Market
- the Mukono–Kyetume–Katosi–Nyenga Road passes through town. At Kisoga, a southern spur measuring 12.5 kilometres (8 mi) runs south to Katosi on the northern shores of Lake Victoria. The road continues east for another 55 kilometres (34 mi) to the New Jinja Bridge at Njeru.

== See also ==
- List of cities and towns in Uganda
- List of roads in Uganda
