= Hellen Asamo =

Ugandan politician (born 1964)

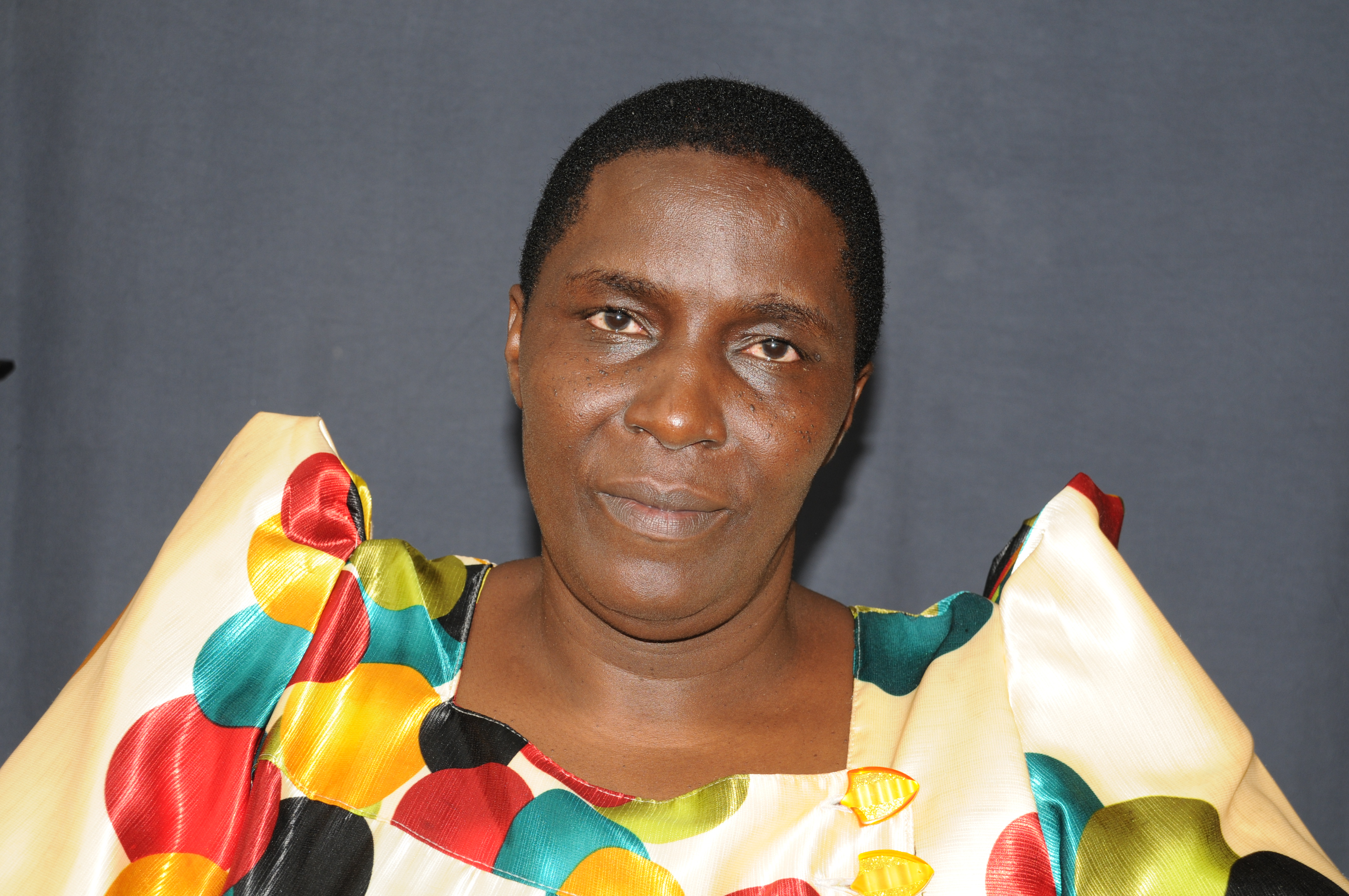
- Born: 24 April 1964 (age 62); Soroti District
- Citizenship: Ugandan
- Education: Soroti Primary School; Nkoma Secondary School; Institute of Teacher Education Kyambogo; Kyambogo University
- Occupations: Teacher and a representative of people with disabilities
- Employer(s): Nakatunya Primary School; Moroto KDA Primary School; National Union of Disabled Persons of Uganda; Soroti Primary School; Moroto Army School; Parliament of Uganda; Uganda Women Parliamentary Association
- Known for: Politics
- Political party: National Resistance Movement

Hellen Asamo also known as Asamo Hellen Grace (born 24 April 1964) is a Ugandan teacher and a representative of people with disabilities for Eastern region who served in the ninth and tenth Parliaments of Uganda. She won the 2021 general elections for her position as the representative of people with disabilities for Eastern region. Asamo is affiliated to the National Resistance Movement political party.

== Early life and education ==
Asamo was born on 24 April 1964. In 1977, she completed her Primary Leaving Examination (PLE) from Soroti Primary School and later joined Nkoma Secondary School to pursue her Uganda Certificate of Education and finished in 1981. In 1990, she was awarded a Grade III Teaching Certificate from Institute of Teacher Education Kyambogo. In 1996, she then got a diploma in education from Institute of Teacher Education Kyambogo again. She holds a bachelor's degree in education (2006) from Kyambogo University.

== Career ==
=== Before politics ===
In 1992–1997, Asamo served as a teacher at Nakatunya Primary School. In 1997, she joined a Moroto KDA Primary School as a teacher and later served at the same school as the deputy head teacher between 1998 and 2000. She joined NUDIPU (National Union of Disabled Persons of Uganda) between 2002 and 2003 and worked as the Ag. executive director. In 1990–1992, she served as a teacher at Soroti Primary School. From 2000 to 2003, she joined Moroto Army School and was employed as the deputy head teacher. From 2003 to 2011, she was the deputy executive director/head of programmes at NUDIPU.

=== Political career ===
From 2013 to date, Asamo has worked as the vice chairperson Equal Opportunities Committee at the Parliament of Uganda. She served as the member of Parliament at the Parliament of Uganda from 2011 to 2021 in the ninth and tenth Parliaments of Uganda.

At the Parliament of Uganda, she served an additional role as the vice chairperson on the Committee on Equal Opportunities, and as a member of the Committee on Gender Labour and Social Development and Appointments Committee.

She tabled a resolution of the NRM Parliamentary Caucus to have President Museveni as an unopposed flagbearer for the party in 2021 elections. Asamo cited that her main reason for endorsing Museveni as a sole candidature was to consolidate his achievements on peace and stability by moving the country towards prosperity, industrialization, and stabilization of the economy.

She is also the member of Uganda Women Parliamentary Association of the 10th Parliament of Uganda.

== Personal life ==
She was born in Soroti District. Asamo is married. She has special interest in facilitating, helping the needy, counselling and attending community activities.

Below are her hobbies:

- Travelling
- Making friends
- Listening to church music
- Reading novels
- Discussions

== See also ==
- List of members of the tenth Parliament of Uganda
- List of members of the ninth Parliament of Uganda
- National Resistance Movement
- Parliament of Uganda
- Eastern region
