= St. Gertrude's Girls' Vocational Secondary School =

Girls' vocational secondary school in Kisoro District, Uganda

Coordinates: 1.2616°S 29.7267°E

- Mutolere, Kisoro District; Uganda

Information
- Type: Secondary school
- Motto: The future is in our hands
- Religious affiliation: Roman Catholic
- Established: 1 June 1981
- Grades: O-Level and A-Level
- Gender: Girls

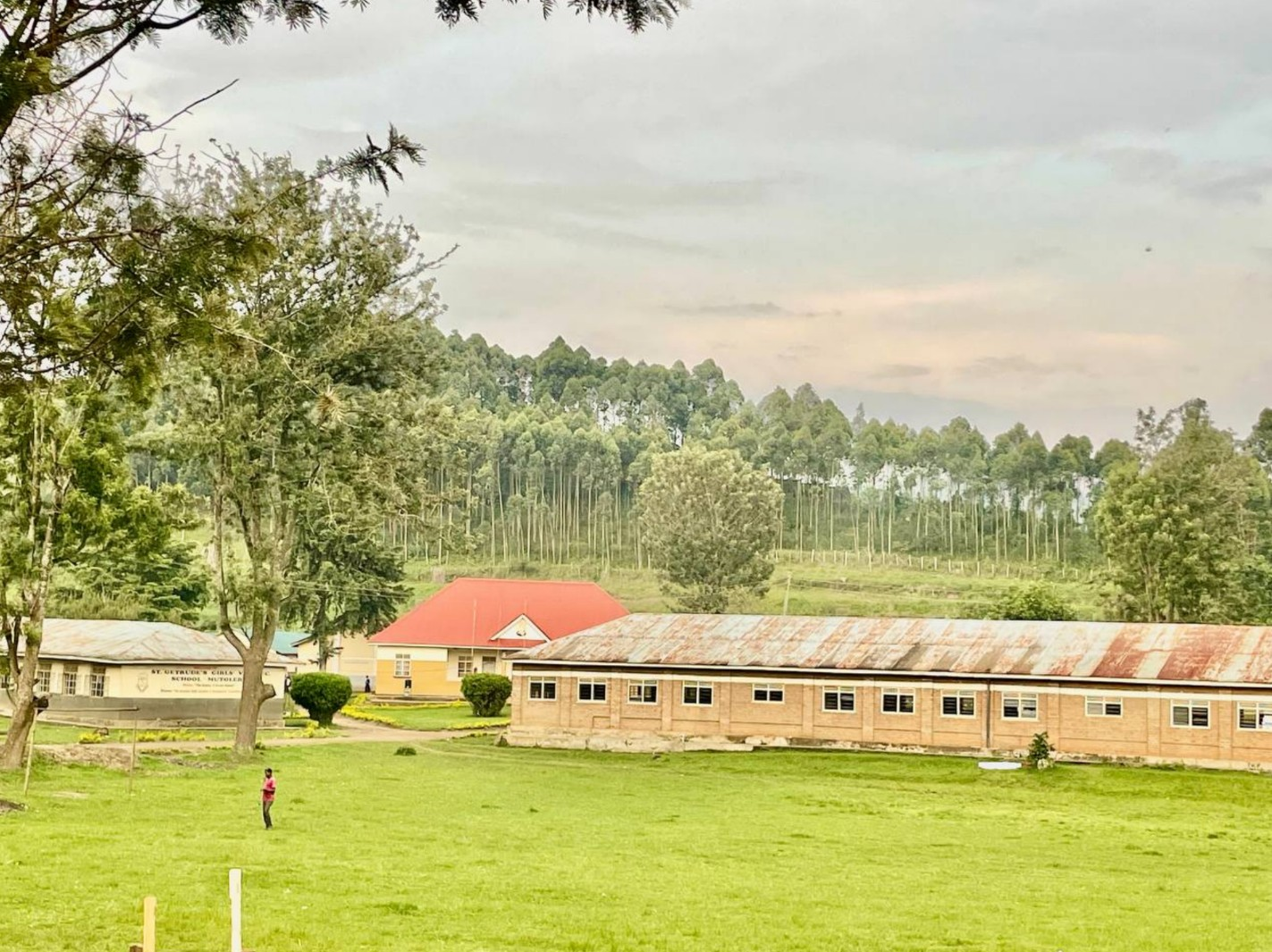
St Gertrude Girls' Vocational School in Kisoro

St. Gertrude's Girls' Vocational Secondary School is a Roman Catholic girls' secondary school located in Mutolere, Kisoro District, in Uganda’s Western Region.

The school was established on 1 June 1981 through the efforts of Catholic parents seeking to expand access to girls’ education in the area. The institution is affiliated with the Kabale Catholic Diocese and operates under the Diocese's Education Department.

== History ==
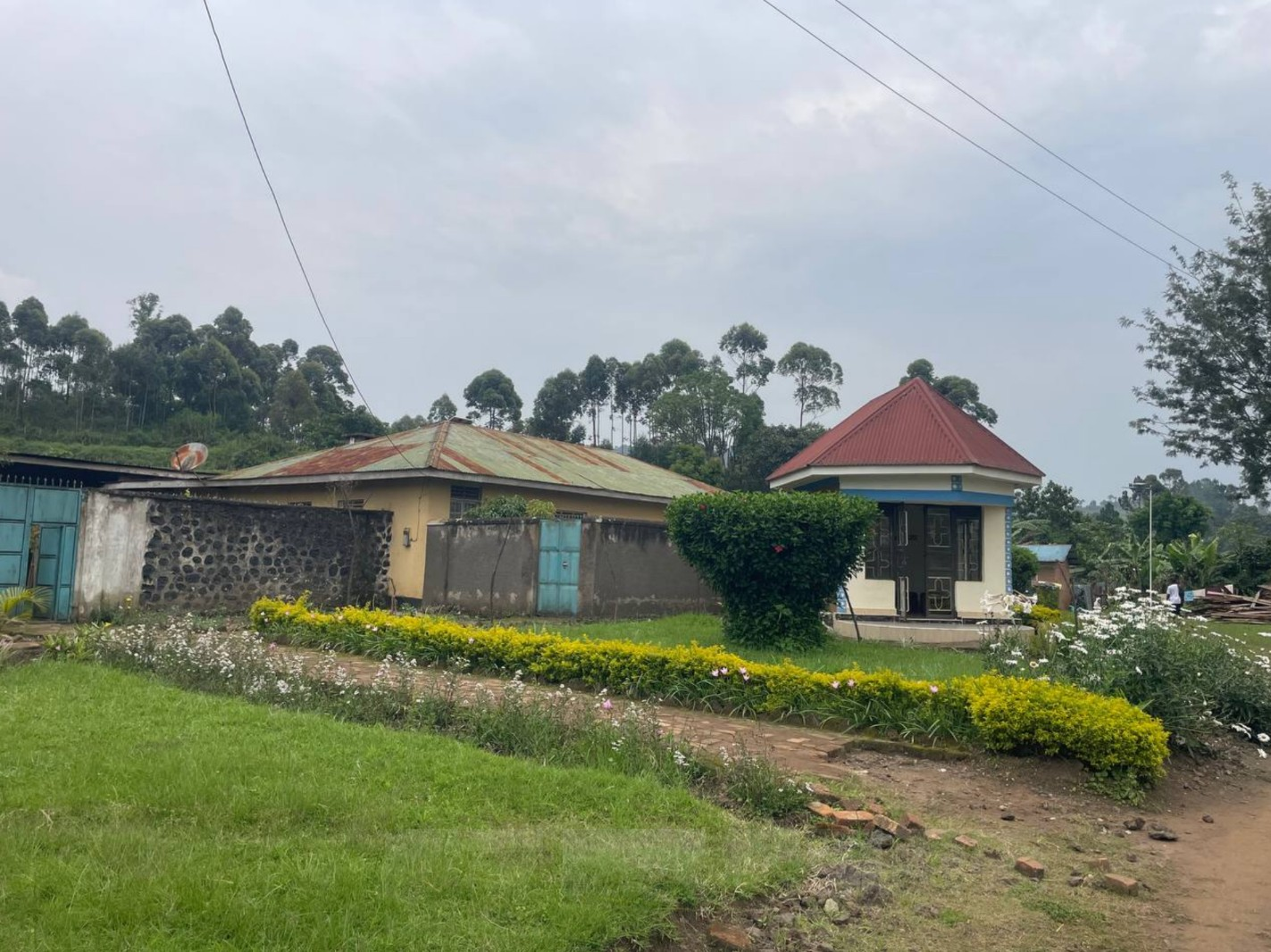
Part of the compound at St Gertrude's Vocational Girls' Secondary School Kisoro, Uganda

The school opened in 1981 with 64 students, with Mrs Juliana Munderi as its founding headmistress, and with the support of Kabale diocese. Later, the school expanded to include Advanced Level (A-Level) education in 1996.

== Academics ==
St. Gertrude's offers both Ordinary Level (O-Level) and Advanced Level (A-Level) education. The school has been listed among performing secondary schools in Kisoro District in national examination results. In addition to academic instruction, the school operates a vocational centre where students undertake skills-based training in areas such as catering, tourism management, accountancy, secretarial studies, computer literacy, and home management.

A student from the school gained national attention after winning school fees support for writing an environmental conservation poem, highlighting the institution's engagement in environmental awareness initiatives.

== Public engagement and co-curricular activities ==
The school has participated in regional academic and civic engagement activities. During the 45th Tarehe Sita anniversary commemorations in the Kigezi sub-region, St. Gertrude's Girls' Vocational Secondary School participated in an inter-school debate in Kabale District focusing on national unity and the legacy of Uganda's 1986 revolution.

The school's teachers have participated in appeals regarding funding challenges and infrastructure needs at the school. The teachers at the school have also been recognized for their academic excellence for initiatives that are making a difference in community.

== See also ==
- Education in Uganda
- Kabale Diocese
- Kisoro District
- Uganda National Examinations Board
