= Andrew Kambugu =

Ugandan physician (born 1973)

- Born: Andrew Ddungu Kambugu; February 22, 1973 (age 53); Uganda
- Education: Makerere University (Bachelor of Medicine and Surgery), (Master of Medicine), Royal College of Physicians (Post Doctoral Fellowship)
- Occupations: Physician, researcher, and academic
- Years active: 1998–present
- Title: The Sande-McKinnell Executive Director at Infectious Disease Institute
- Spouse: Joyce Balagadde-Kambugu

Andrew Ddungu Kambugu is a Ugandan physician who serves as the Sande-McKinnell Executive Director at the Infectious Disease Institute in Uganda and an honorary senior lecturer at Makerere University College of Health Sciences. He is also an adjunct associate professor at the University of Minnesota. In July 2020, he was appointed to the United Nations 2021 Food System Scientific Group.

== Early life and education ==
Kambugu was born on 22 February 1973 in Kampala, Uganda. He attended Buganda Road Primary School and went on to King's College Budo for both his O and A levels. He studied medicine at Makerere University between 1992 and 2002, graduating with a master's degree in medicine. He then completed a fellowship in infectious diseases at the University of Utah and the University of Manitoba from 2002 to 2005, as well as a fellowship at the Royal College of Physicians in 2014.

== Career ==
Kambugu trained at Mulago National Hospital and Makerere University Medical School in Kampala. He also served as a Medical Officer of Uganda Telecom from 1998 to 1999. He served as the Head of Preventative Care and Treatment Programme at the Infectious Disease Institute (IDI) from 2005 to 2012. At the IDI, he became Head of Research Programme in 2012 and the Sande-McKinnell Executive Director in 2018, continuing to serve in both roles as of 2026. Academically, Kambugu is an honorary senior lecturer in the Department of Medicine at Makerere University College of Health Sciences, as well as an adjuct associate professor for infectious diseases at the University of Minnesota. Kambugu serves as a consultant to the World Health Organization on antiretroviral therapy since 2010.

== Research ==
As of 2026, Kambugu has an h-index of 55 and has been cited more than ten thousand times. He is a member of the council of the African Centers of Excellence in Bioinformatics and Data Intensive Sciences. His most influential work includes studies on managing treatment of antiretroviral therapy with cryptococcal meningitis, studies of antiretroviral medications for HIV, work on patient retention in HIV care, and complications of HIV infection.

== Personal life ==
Kambugu is married to Joyce Balagadde-Kambugu and they have two children.
