= Mulago School for the Deaf =

Special school in Uganda

Coordinates: 0.3462°N 32.5742°E

Mulago School for the Deaf is a school in Uganda for special needs or deaf children and is found in Mulago, Kampala. The school was founded in 1998 by Fr. Hurry Tulleman. It began as a kindergarten and was formally known as Parents of Deaf Children Association. The school has a special curriculum designed for special education for deaf students as a form of disability and has received support from the U.S Embassy Kampala, Uganda who constructed a computer library at the school to boost computer literacy education, and French Embassy Kampala Uganda who constructed a girls dormitory at the school. Other partners like QNET have offered support to the school by donating scholastic materials and school requirements to the learners.

The school is under the leadership of the headteacher Pius Okecho and is supervised by the Ministry of Education and Sports, a government agency monitoring school performance in Uganda. The school has participated in reseacrh findings to strengthen learning and limit gaps in special education which was conducted by African Health Sciance in partnership with Makerere University Medical School.

== Location ==
The school is found in Mulago, Kawempe division in Kampala.

== See also ==
- National Union of Persons with Disability in Uganda
- Disability in Uganda
- National Union of Women with Disabilities of Uganda
