= Rubaga Community School =

Primary school in Kampala, Uganda

Information
- School type: Boarding school
- Established: Mid-1980s
- Grades: Nursery - Primary 7
- Enrollment: c.280

Rubaga Community School is a primary school located on the outskirts of Kampala, the capital of the African Great Lakes country of Uganda.

== Overview ==
The school was established in the mid-1980s by Jjajja Manjeri, an elderly woman who took in 3 orphans and started educating the children in hopes of providing a future for them. Because of her work in the community, more children who were in difficult circumstances were sent to Jjajja Manjeri. The school, today known as Rubaga Community School, has since progressed and has gone from educating children under a tree to having multiple classrooms.

The school has governmental approval and certification as an educational institution, but it receives no economic support from the state. Locals run the daily operations with help from international NGOs like International Child Welfare Service and Rubaga Friends.

The schools classes span from nursery school to primary 7 and all together it has 280 students. Some of the students are orphans and live at the school on full boarding.
