= St. John Fisher Ibanda Secondary School =

Catholic school in Ibanda, Uganda

St. John Fisher Ibanda Secondary School is a Ugandan Catholic boys-only boarding secondary school, located in the town of Ibanda in the Ibanda District of the Western Region.

== History and operations ==
The school was founded by the Brothers of Christian Instruction in 1966.

Its headmaster is Brother Tamale Herman. As of February 2016, 648 students were enrolled and lived at the school.

The school is named for Saint John Fisher.

Ibanda Secondary School is under the Brothers of Christian Instruction. It is well known in Uganda particularly in western Uganda as a single (boys) school. Ibanda secondary school has been one of the best performing schools in Academics, discipline and Sports within the district and allover Uganda overs the years.

Ibanda secondary school in 2022 participated in the national football champions where they managed to be the third in their group

== See also ==
- Education in Uganda
- List of boarding schools
- List of schools in Uganda
- Roman Catholicism in Uganda
