= Lagos Countdown =

Festival in Lagos

Greater Lagos Fiesta
- Genre: New Year's Eve event
- Date: December 31
- Frequency: Yearly
- Locations: Barbeach, Lagos Island, Epe, Ikorodu, Agege, Lagos
- Inaugurated: 2012
- Founder: Governor Babatunde Fashola
- Most recent: 2025
- Next event: 2026
- Organiser: Lagos State Signage & Advertisement Agency (LASAA)
- Website: onelagosfiesta.ng

The Lagos Countdown, renamed One Lagos Fiesta in 2015 and now Greater Lagos Fiesta, is an annual New Year's Eve event at the Bar Beach in Lagos. The event lasts for 21–23 days and traditionally begins on the 7th or 8 December and lasts through January 1 of the new year. The first Lagos Countdown was held in 2012 as an attempt to drive up tourism and make an event similar to New Year's events in New York, Sydney, and other major cities, and in 2013 an estimated 200,000 people celebrated the event during a ten-day period and earned the city about one billion naira.

Festivities for the countdown typically include fireworks, live music concerts, and karaoke. Performers at various countdowns have included Tuface Idibia, Olamide, and Funke Akindele, and previous countdown sponsors have included Airtel Nigeria.

The 2013 Lagos Countdown was met with criticism from some participants as ticket distribution was held differently from the 2012 event, as tickets were not free and required that many participants purchase their own tickets via scalpers or to acquire tickets via Countdown sponsors. When asked about this, the corporate affairs manager of LASAA responded that while tickets were not intended to have been sold, the different distribution tactics were enacted as a form of crowd control and to avoid potential issues due to overcrowded space.

== One Lagos Fiesta ==
Lagos Countdown was renamed One Lagos Fiesta in 2015 under the administration of Mr. Akinwunmi Ambode and is now known as the Greater Lagos Fiesta.

In 2021, the Greater Lagos Fiesta was suspended to tackle the fourth wave of COVID-19 making it the first time the event was suspended since its inception.

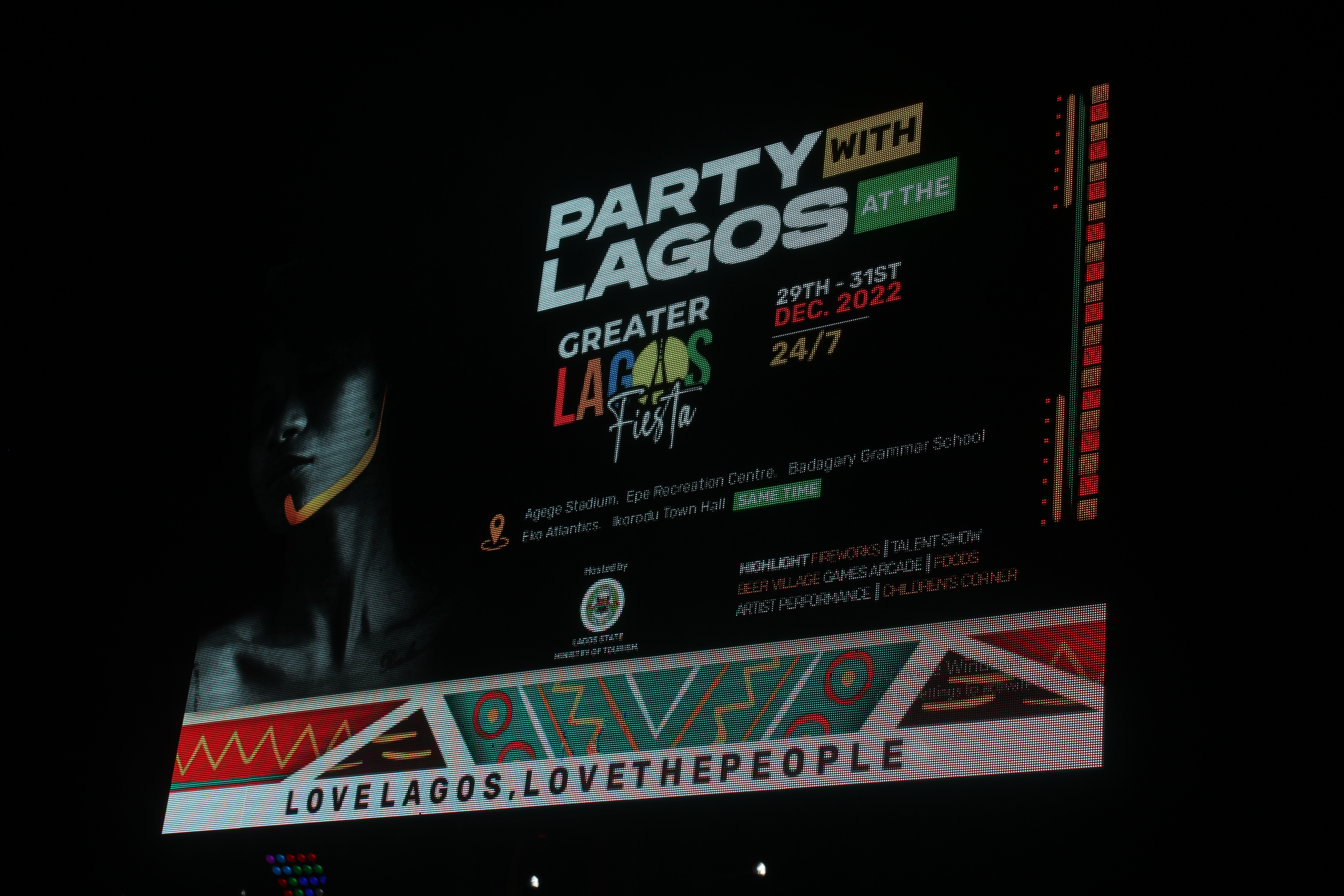
Greater Lagos Fiesta,2022

== Greater Lagos Fiesta re-opened ==
The Lagos State Government return the annual New year's eve events tagged Greater Lagos Fiesta. The events reopen in Lagos after being suspended by the Lagos state government due to the pandemic in 2020. Greater Lagos Fiesta is an event created by the state government through the Ministry of Tourism, Art, and Culture to entertain residents in all five divisions of Lagos.

== See also ==
- Festivals in Nigeria
