= Regina Bafaki =

Ugandan women's rights advocate and civil society leader

- Citizenship: Ugandan
- Education: Master's degree in Gender and Development Studies; Postgraduate degree in Development Policy, Planning and Management
- Occupations: Civil society leader; Women's rights advocate; Gender activist
- Organizations: Action for Development (ACFODE); Solidarity for Youth Empowerment (SOFOYE); Uganda Women's Network (UWONET); Centre for Domestic Violence Prevention (CEDOVIP); Kigezi Women in Development (KWID); Cross-Cultural Foundation of Uganda (CCFU)
- Known for: Advocacy on gender justice, women's political participation, domestic violence prevention, cyberbullying, and climate justice in Uganda
- Title: Executive Director, Action for Development (ACFODE)

Regina Bafaki is a Ugandan civil society leader and women's rights advocate who serves as the executive director of Action for Development (ACFODE).

She works on domestic violence, gender norms, cyberbullying, women's political participation, and climate justice.

== Career and education ==
Bafaki is a feminist and gender activist. She holds a master's degree in Gender and Development Studies, and a postgraduate degree in Development Policy, Planning and Management.

She has initiated several programmes to contribute to gender responsive development such as "Sauti Ya Sasa," and inter-university debates. She led the creation of a youth-focused organization called Solidarity for Youth Empowerment (SOFOYE).

She has served as executive director of ACFODE, one of Uganda's longstanding women's rights organizations. She has represented the organization in public advocacy on gender equality, women's empowerment, and democratic participation. Bafaki has also participated in national discussions on elections and democracy during debates around Uganda's 2021 electoral roadmap.

She has served on several boards, including at Kigezi Women in Development (KWID), Action Aid International Uganda, Uganda Women Network (UWONET), and Centre for Domestic Violence (CEDOVIP). She has been a member of the advisory board for the European Union-supported Civil Society in Uganda Support Programme (CUSP); a member of the advisory committee of Inclusive Decisions at Local level (IDEAL), a programme run by VNG International (The Netherlands); and a member of the board of trustees of Cross-Cultural Foundation of Uganda (CCFU).

== Advocacy priorities ==
Bafaki's advocacy has focused on gender justice, protection of women from violence, and expanding women's participation in public life.

Bafaki has supported girl-child education, financial literacy for women, and the protection of election observers and other civic actors during electoral processes. Her later public engagements have also included environmental and climate justice advocacy, particularly support for women and youth environmental human rights defenders.
