= Iganga Boys Boarding Primary School =

Iganga Boys' Boarding Primary School
- Eastern Region; Iganga; Uganda

Information
- School type: All Boys' School
- Motto: Aim as high as a lark
- Denomination: Christian school
- Founded: Church Missionary Society in 1919
- School district: Iganga District
- Head of school: Okoth Daniel
- Gender: Boys
- Campus type: Boarding school

Iganga Boys ' Boarding Primary School is located in Iganga Districtin Uganda along Jinja Road.

== History ==
Iganga Boys' Boarding Primary School was founded in 1919 by Church Missionary Society. It is now a government aided boys' boarding school covering primary one to primary seven. The student population is 1,000.
