= Luweero Secondary School =

Luweero Senior Secondary School

Location
- Luweero, Luweero District; Uganda
- 00°50′15″N 32°29′44″E

Information
- Type: Public middle school and high school (8–13)
- Religious affiliation: Church of Uganda
- Established: 1964; 62 years ago
- Founder: Reverend Canon Sajjabi
- Enrollment: 1,600+ (2018)?
- Athletics: Football, track

Luweero Secondary School, also Luwero Secondary School, whose full name is Luweero Senior Secondary School, is a combined middle (Senior 1 to Senior 4) and high school (Senior 5 to Senior 6), in the town of Luweero, in Luweero District, in the Buganda Region of Uganda. The school is a Church of Uganda funded and owned, government-aided, mixed, day and boarding school.

== Location ==
Luweero SSS is located in the town of Luweero, along the Kampala–Gulu Highway, approximately 64 kilometres (40 mi), by road, north of Kampala, the capital of Uganda and its largest city. The geographical coordinates of the school campus are 0°50'15.0"N, 32°29'44.0"E (Latitude:0.837500; Longitude:32.495556).

== History ==
The school's foundation is laid on the Anglican Church of Uganda. The school originated from a joint Parents meeting of Luweero Boys and Luweero Girls Schools held on 23 November 1964 chaired by retired Parish Priest Reverend Canon Sajjabi. He was the overall supervisor of both school on behalf of Namirembe Diocese. In that particular meeting parents passed the resolution to start a Senior Secondary School versed on Church of Uganda foundation.

That year the Government of Uganda declared the phasing out of the primary eight classes which was leading a pupil to sit for Junior Secondary Certificate Examinations. A year was slashed off and a new level introduced a primary leaving examination (PLE) Certificate after completing a seven-year course.

In 1964 Reverend Canon Sajjabi advised the parents to elect an organizing committee for the construction of a secondary school block. The committee was elected and the school started in 1968, with a population of eight students. The school has now a population of 1500 students. It is the biggest day Government Aided School in Luweero District.

The School offers Boarding Facilities to those students whose homes are far from school. To date Luweero SS is one of the best performing schools in the District and the County in the National Examinations.

== School activities ==
The school engages its staff and students in different activities. These include

- Teaching the learners
- Conducting workshops and seminars for staff development.
- Conducting spiritual activities for both the students and staff members
- Regular meetings for Board of Governors, parents, staff and students.
- Visitation field work, study tours, commemoration and competitions.
- Community outreach programmes
- Inducting new employees students in the school system
- Teamwork and unity is greatly emphasized in order to realize good result

Teachers are self-motivated. They carry out effective teaching by keeping time so that no time is wasted. Teachers give exercises and mark students exercises especially are mathematics and English beginning of term, mid term and end of term examinations are three compulsory sets of examination which students must write. Teachers also show keen interest by helping learners who have learning challenges outside the normal lessons.

=== Workshops and seminars for students and staff development ===
The school organizes and encourages teachers and students to attend. Some of the workshops had themes such as “Effective Teaching”, Team Work and, Effective Communication

=== Field work and study trips ===
Students visit and travel for study purposes various areas outside their school. Geography and agriculture trips are common students study the phenomenon as it exist in the field in so doing students are taught how to take clear observations, gain skills in recording information and analysing the data collected in the field students are helped to appreciate and maintain the environment.

=== Guidance and counselling ===
It is every teachers role to guide and counsel students. Students are guided in their curricular and co-curricular activities. Students who have different forms of challenges are also counselled. This helps them to overcome hard times when they cannot stand on their own. In so doing students are enabled to stay in school and learn effectively.

=== Community outreach programmes ===
The staff and students participate in activities and create a close relationship with the surrounding community. The patriotic club offered to clean Kasana town market and the cleaning was done communally with the local population such activities create a strong bond between the community and the school hence school community relations.

=== Inducting new staff and students ===
The newly recruited teachers are inducted to get into the school system by the Dean of Studies, Semambo Joseph. The old staff also helped the new members to become conversant with the system.

Prefects play an active role in helping the new students becoming adopted to the new environments.

Set of school rules and regulations are usually handed over to the newcomers who are encouraged to read, understand and sign them.

Student counsellors do help their fellow students to keep on the right track.

== Notable alumni ==
- Mwanje Gideon Ugandan lawyer and former president of Uganda Law Students Association

== See also ==
- List of schools in Uganda
