= Blessed Sacrament Secondary School Kimaanya =

Catholic school in Masaka City, Uganda

Coordinates: 0°20′55″S 31°44′04″E

Blessed Sacrament Secondary School, Kimaanya, is a private, Catholic-sponsored secondary school located in Kimaanya, Masaka City, in Central Uganda. The school is listed among the educational institutions of the Diocese of Masaka and is located in the Kimaanya/Kyabakuza area of Masaka.

== Location ==
It is located in Kimaanya, Masaka City, in Central Uganda. The school is situated in the Kimaanya/Kyabakuza area of Masaka. It is listed by the Masaka Diocese among its educational institutions, with a postal address of P.O. Box 1096, Masaka, Uganda.

== History ==
It is a Catholic-founded secondary school located in Kimaanya, Masaka City, Uganda, it forms part of the Catholic educational institutions associated with the Masaka Diocese. The Kimaanya Catholic Parish, where the school is located, was established in 1961 and is served by members of the Catholic religious community. The school was already operating by the 1990s, with former students recalling their attendance at Kimaanya Blessed Sacrament Secondary School during that period.

The school has continued to operate as a secondary education institution offering boarding and day education and in 2022, the school attracted national attention following the disappearance of a boarding student. Later that year, more than 1,000 students were suspended following a student strike over several issues, including power outages, food, water supply, tuition fees and corporal punishment.

== Notable alumni ==
The school has notable alumni many of whom are active in politics, public and private sector.

- Jimmy Spire Ssentongo
