= Kyamakanda Secondary School =

School in Uganda

Kyamakanda Secondary School is a government secondary school located in Kyamakanda Parish, Buyanja Subcounty, Rukungiri District of Uganda. It has both O level and A level with both boys and girls.

== Foundation ==
Kyamakanda Secondary School is a church founded school under the management of North Kigezi Diocese.
