= Christian Upliftment School =

- Kampala; Uganda

Information
- Established: 2005; 21 years ago

The Christian Upliftment School, which is located in Kampala, Uganda, mainly serves orphans who have been displaced by Lord's Resistance Army insurgency in the north. These students have been brought to Kampala where it is much safer. The school was founded in 2005.
