= UNIFAT =

Elementary school in Uganda

Upper Nile Institute for Appropriate Technology

Information
- Established: 1986; 40 years ago
- Founder: Abitimo Odongkara

UNIFAT is an elementary school in Gulu, Uganda, started by Abitimo Odongkara. Its name stands for Upper Nile Institute for Appropriate Technology.

It provides education for:

- Ethnic minorities forced into internal displacement camps in a brutal civil war.
- Children abducted to become soldiers and sex slaves in a rebel army called the Lord's Resistance Army.
- Citizens terrorized by government and rebel soldiers alike.
- Children walking miles into town to sleep in safety each night.
- The scourge of AIDS

Unified for Uganda is a Greater Cincinnati High School based student group dedicated to raising awareness of UNIFAT and sponsoring students to attend UNIFAT through events, sales, and fundraisers. Schools involved Include Eastern High School (New Jersey), Moeller High School, Mount Notre Dame High School, Purcell Marian High School, Sycamore High School (Cincinnati, Ohio), and Madeira High School, Anderson High School, Taylor High School, Wyoming High School, and others from the Greater Cincinnati Area.
