= Pope John Paul II College, Gulu =

Coordinates: 2°48′50.0898″N 32°16′55.5564″E

St John Paul II College Gulu
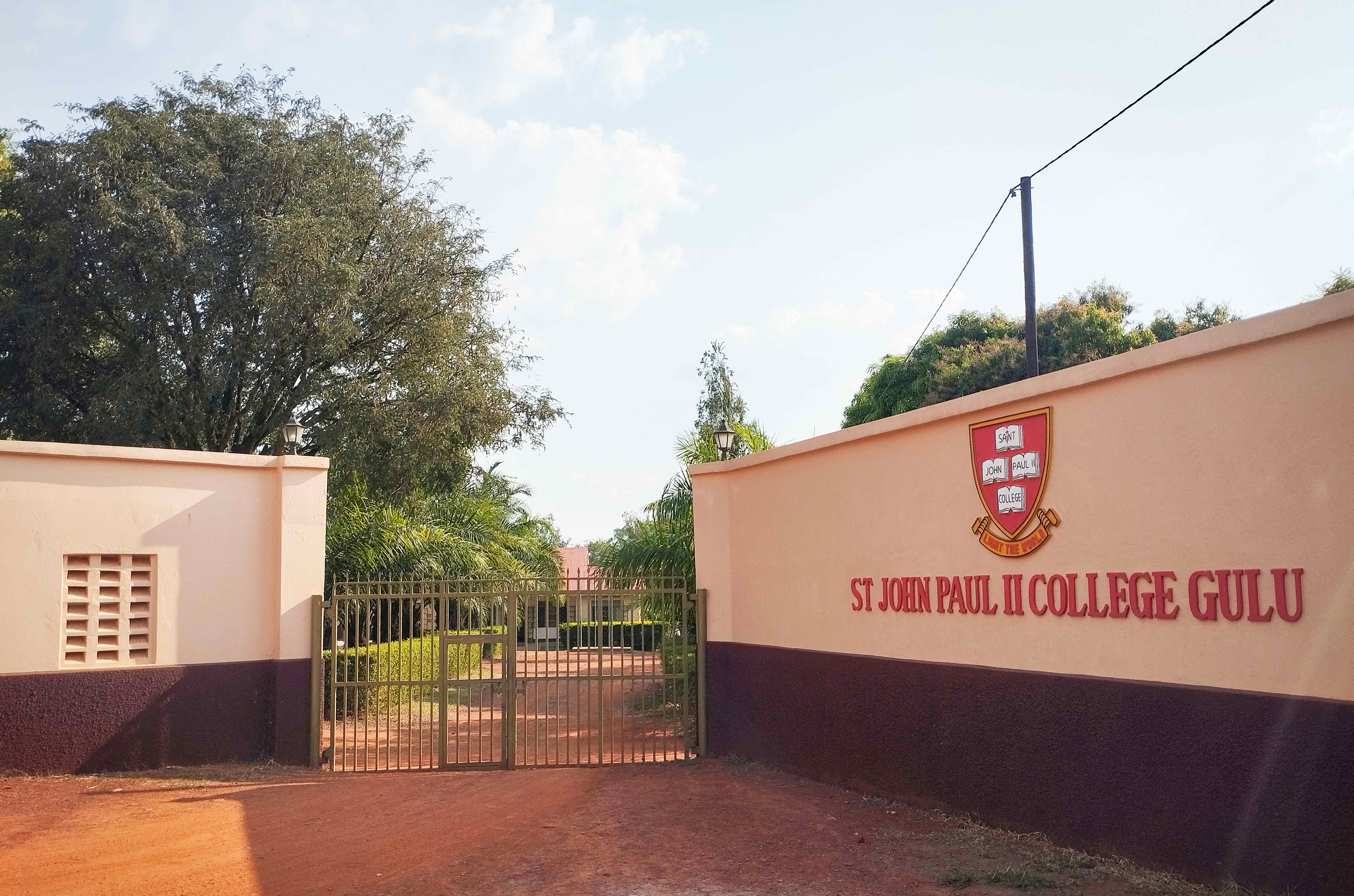

Location
- Laliya Dwol, Plot 12, Block 2 Laliya; Gulu, Gulu City; Uganda

Information
- Type: Private Secondary School
- Headteacher: Innocent Anecho
- Enrollment: 1200
- Website: stjohnpaul2college.ac.ug

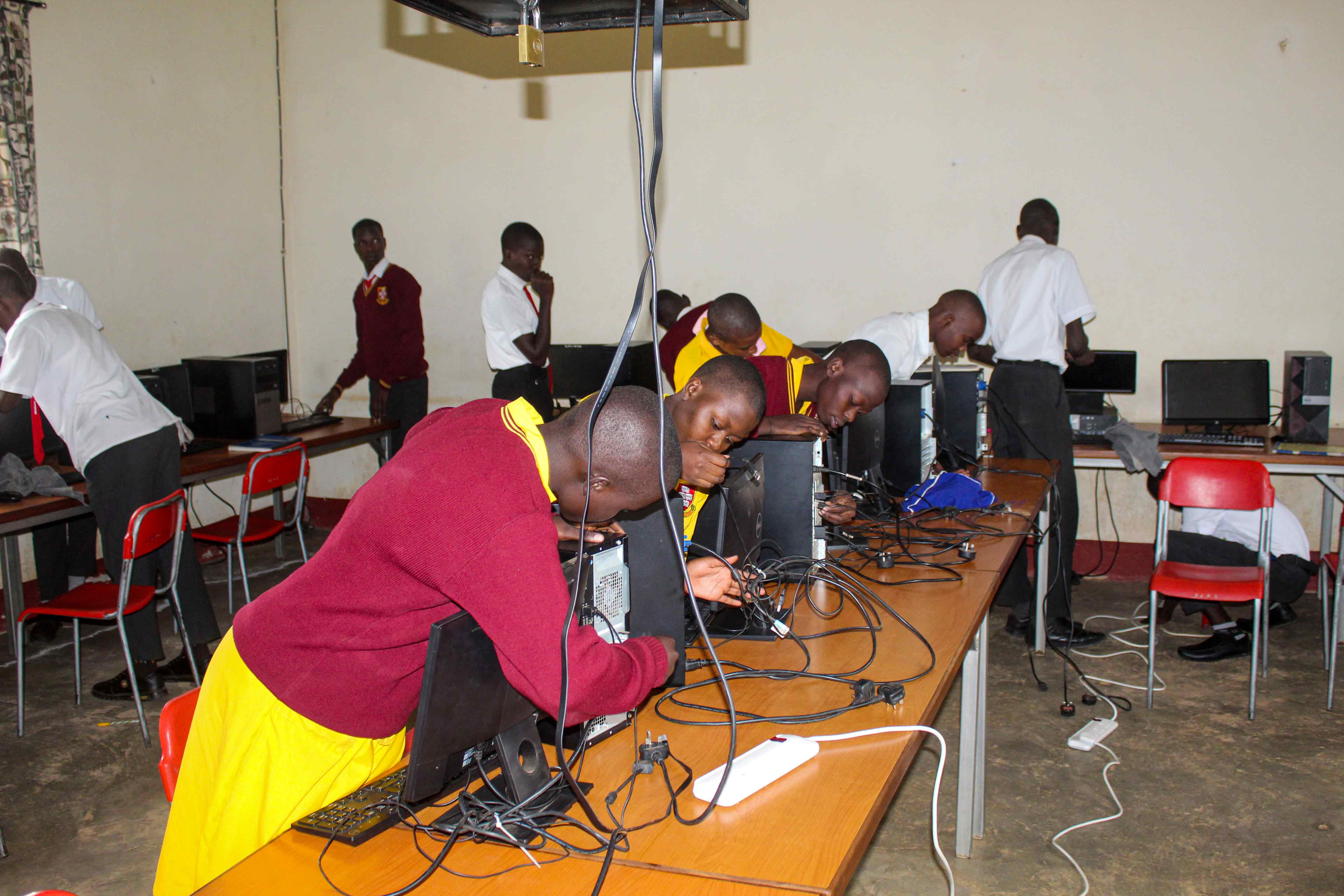

St John Paul II College Gulu is a boys and girls O and A level secondary school in Laliya Dwol,Bardege - Layibi Division , Gulu City, Uganda. SJPIIC is a private Catholic boarding school which hosts approximately 1200 students.

The school was one of the top performers across the Acholi sub-region on the Ugandan Advanced Certificate of Education tests in 2025.

== See also ==
- St. Mary's College Kisubi
- St. Peter's College Tororo
