= Busaana Modern Academy =

Secondary school in Kayunga, Uganda

- Kayunga, Ntenjeru County; Uganda

Information
- Type: Secondary school
- Motto: Aim at Success
- Established: 1995
- Founder: James Dramani, Francis Draga
- Gender: Mixed

Busaana Modern Academy was the first private Ordinary-level, mixed/day secondary school in Bugerere, within Kayunga (then part of Mukono District). It opened in 1995, nine years after Busaana SS, a government school opened in the same subcounty when the NRM Government had risen to power in Uganda. The school is registered under the Ministry of Education and Sports (MoES).

== History ==
With permission from the Local Council I to III and the Education Office in Mukono, BMA started with Senior One and Two classes in February 1995. Premises were rented in town while construction on the current site (Plot 13, Kireku Road, about half a kilometre from Busaana Taxi Park) started a year later. By January 1999, BMA had moved and the school also obtained a license. Despite resistance and opposition from some people, the school is still operational and lobbying for the government's Universal Secondary Education (USE) program. An examination main hall that doubles as a laboratory has been constructed as required by MoES for a Centre Number. Today, BMA educates students up to Senior Four, the Uganda Certificate of Education (UCE) Examination Level.

== See also ==
- Education in Uganda
