= Dr. Obote College Boroboro =

Boarding secondary school in Uganda

- Lira, Lira District; Uganda

Information
- Type: Public mixed high school (8–13)
- Motto
- Religious affiliation: Church of Uganda
- Established: 1962; 64 years ago
- Enrollment: 1,257 (1,155 males & 102 females) (2018)
- Athletics: Football, rugby, track, tennis, volleyball, basketball, hockey and swimming
- Website: Homepage

Dr. Obote College -Boroboro (DOC) is a government-aided, mixed (co-educational), boarding, secondary school in Uganda. It caters to school grades 8–13 (S1–S6).

== Location ==
The school campus is located in Boroboro East Parish, Adekokwok Sub-county, in Lira District, in the Northern Region of Uganda. Boroboro is approximately 12 kilometres (7 mi), by road, southeast of the city of Lira, along the Lira–Dokolo–Soroti Road. The geographical coordinates of the school campus are 02°11'23.0"N, 32°55'48.0"E (Latitude:2.189722; Longitude:32.930000).

== Overview ==
As of 2000, the school had 1,257 enrolled students, of whom 1,155 (91.9 percent) were males and 102 (8.1 percent) were female. The O-Level section (S1 to S4) were all males, with the girls admitted to S5 and S6 only. All students were residential, without any day-students in the school.

DOCB is strong in science subjects. In 2013 the school won first prize in the high school robotics competition organized by the College of Engineering, Design, Art and Technology of Makerere University, Uganda's oldest and largest public university.

== History ==
According to the school webpage, DOC was established in 1962 as Lira Junior Secondary School. That same year, it was combined with St Katherine Girls' School. The first head teacher was Mrs. E.A. Angulo. Boroboro Senior Secondary School was established in 1964 and replaced Lira Junior Secondary School. Later in 1964, Boroboro Senior Secondary School was re-named Dr. Obote College Boroboro. The head teacher at that time was Edward Ejura.

== Alumni ==
Prominent alumni of the school include:

- Jacob L'Okori Oulanyah(RIP): agricultural economist and lawyer, who served as the Speaker of the 11th Parliament of Uganda from 2021 to 2022.

== See also ==
- Education in Uganda
- Saint Katherine Secondary School
