= Africa Renewal =

United Nations magazine

- Cover of the April 2012 issue
- Categories: Political magazine
- Frequency: Quarterly
- Publisher: United Nations
- Founded: 1987
- Country: United States
- Based in: New York City
- Language: English, French
- Website: www.un.org/africarenewal
- ISSN: 1816-9627

Africa Renewal is a magazine published by the United Nations. The magazine was established in 1987. It was formerly published as Africa Recovery/Afrique Relance. The magazine is published on a quarterly basis. It focuses on the critical economic, political and social situation in Africa. Africa Renewal (print and online) highlights the efforts made by Africa and the international community to promote the economic recovery and sustainable development of the region in pursuit of the goals of the new partnership for Africa's development (NEPAD) and the achievement of the Millennium Development Goals (MDGs).

The magazine's stories are usually about climate change, food security, conflict resolution efforts, gender equality and women's empowerment, youth, etc. Its focus and writing style enables it to leverage the increasing reader interest in stories about Africa that are not in the mainstream media.
