= Disability in Uganda =

Persons with disabilities in Uganda are significant minority groups; disability refers to the permanent or substantial functioning limitations in the daily life activities due to impairments and environmental barriers.

== Defining disability ==
The Persons with Disabilities Act (2006/2020) defines disability as a substantial functional limitation of daily life activities from physical, mental or sensory impairments made worse by societal barriers, resulting in limited participation in society on equal basis with others. This definition reflects a right-based, social model approach, acknowledging the interaction between a person's impairment and environmental and attitudinal barriers that hinder full participation of persons with disabilities in community activities. In Uganda, disability is broadly accepted that it includes and is not limited to the following:

- communication and speech difficulties
- autism
- blindness/poor vision
- cerebral palsy
- epilepsy
- intellectual difficulties
- deaf/hearing impairments
- albinism
- mobility impairments
- mental health disorders
- cancer
- multiple and complex disabilities

== Statistics ==
According to the 2024 National Population and Housing Census, approximately 13.2% of the population aged 2 years and above, around 5.5 million people had a disability. Lango sub-region had the highest prevalence at 17.4%, while Kampala reported the lowest at 8.5%. Females reported slightly higher rates of disability; 13.8% among females and 12.5% among males. 434,922 people have walking difficulties, 349,960 people have memory difficulties, 329,489 people have low vision, 273,167 people have hearing impairments, 184,991 people have communication difficulties, 41,431 people are deaf, 28,843 people are blind, and 6,314 people are considered deaf-blind.

== Disparities ==
=== Education ===
Children with disabilities are significantly less likely to be in school compared to those without disabilities, and when they are enrolled they are more likely to be in poorly resourced settings without teacher training or accessible materials. Barriers include inaccessible infrastructure, lack of teacher support for inclusive pedagogy, and social stigma, this explains the results of a report indicating that while about 9% join primary school, only 6% are likely to complete primary and join secondary schools (Uganda National Action on Physical Disabilities (UNAPD) report (2018/2024)).

=== Health ===
Access to medical care, rehabilitation services and essential assistive technologies (AT) — such as wheelchairs, hearing aids, eyeglasses and prosthetics — is limited, particularly in rural areas. National assessments (including WHO/UGA assistive-technology capacity reports and Uganda's rapid AT assessment) document shortages in supply, fragmented procurement systems, and weak referral pathways that leave many without the devices they need to participate fully in society.

=== Economic ===
Persons with disabilities are overrepresented among the poorest households and face higher unemployment and underemployment rates. Barriers to work include inaccessible workplaces, lack of reasonable accommodations, limited access to vocational training and credit, and employer discrimination. International analyses and country-level studies have repeatedly linked disability with higher poverty risk, with households with a person with disability being 30% likely to be poor unless targeted inclusion measures are implemented.

=== Physical accessibility and transport ===
Public buildings, transport and public information systems are often not accessible. This constrains mobility, participation in civic life, and access to services. Although the law specifies accessibility obligations, enforcement, and retrofitting remain weak in many districts.

== Legal and policy frameworks ==
=== 1995 Constitution of Uganda ===
The Constitution of Uganda prohibits discrimination against people with disability in Article 21 and mandates Affirmative action for marginalized groups including persons with disabilities in Article 32. The country also recognizes the Ugandan Sign Language as part of the constitution. and provides space for representation of persons with disabilities in the national parliament and local councils.

=== United Nations Convention on Rights of Persons with Disabilities ===
Uganda ratified this in 2008, guiding its national laws.

=== Persons with Disability Act (2020) ===
This is a landmark law for promoting rights, inclusion and dignity of persons with disabilities that replaced the 2006 Act of Persons with Disabilities, establishing the National Council for Persons with Disabilities (NCPD). This council is mandated to promote and monitor advocacy covering areas of non-discrimination, reasonable accommodation, education, employment and access to justice for persons with disabilities.

=== Revised National Policy on persons with disabilities, 2023 ===
This policy aims to reinforce the older policy while incorporating new issues and aligning with the international commitments like United Nations Convention on Rights of Persons with Disabilities (UNCRPD).

== Key organizations and institutions ==
The Ministry of Gender, Labor and Social Development (MGLSD) is the primary government entity for the welfare, rights and coordination of services for persons with disabilities. It coordinates the national Community-Based Rehabilitation programs and works to integrate disability issues into the national development plans. The ministry's functions include policy development and resource allocation.

The National Council for Persons with Disabilities (NCPD) was re-established by the Persons with Disabilities Act, 2020. It is a semi-autonomous body that monitors the implementation and compliance of disability-related legislation, policies and programs by both government and private entities. Its mandate includes:

- conducting surveys and investigation on rights violation
- advocating for the development of programs to improve persons with disabilities' welfare
- establish programs of counseling and guidance for persons with disabilities
- regulating human support services like sign language interpretation and guiding services

=== National Union of Disabled Persons of Uganda ===
National Union of Disabled Persons of Uganda (NUDIPU) is the largest and primary indigenous umbrella organization. It unites various disability movements or categories and district-level unions across the country. It acts as the voice to influence the enactment and enforcement of disability-friendly laws and policies such as the National Disability Manifesto 2026–2031. It provides training, access to micro-credits, promotes capacity building and monitor compliance with national and international human rights instruments like the UNCRPD.

=== National Union of Women with Disabilities of Uganda ===
The National Union of Women with Disabilities of Uganda (NUWODU) focuses on the unique challenges faced by women and girls with disabilities, addressing double-discrimination (gender and disability). It advocates for sexual and reproductive health rights and promotes their participation in the development processes.

=== Uganda National Action on Physical Disability ===
Uganda National Action on Physical Disability (UNAPD) was founded in 1998. It specifically represents and advocates for the rights and needs of persons with disabilities. It focuses on removing barriers to access the physical environment to promote inclusion, provides rehabilitation and creates awareness about the potential and challenges of persons with disabilities.

=== Uganda National Association for the Blind ===
Uganda National Association for the Blind (UNAB) was founded in 1970. It is an indigenous association that focuses on improving the quality of life of persons with visual impairments. Over decades, UNAB has evolved to become a well-recognised and competent disabled persons' organization with strong ties to both national and international partners, including National Union of Disabled Persons of Uganda (NUDIPU), the African Union of the Blind (AFUB) and the World Union of the Blind (WUB). It emphasizes the importance of braille for communication of these persons with visual impairments.

=== Uganda National Association for the Deaf ===
Uganda National Association for the Deaf (UNAD) was established in 1973. It is the leading non-government and voluntary association for the persons with hearing impairments. It serves as a national umbrella organization for all grassroot associations of the deaf in the country, including those with complex disabilities like deaf-blind conditions. It is highly consulted by the government and other non-government organizations about matters concerning the deaf community of Uganda. It provides sign language and braille services for those with hearing impairments and the deaf-blind ones.

=== Legal Action for Persons with Disabilities ===
Legal Action for Persons with Disabilities (LAPD) provides free legal aid, counseling and representation in the court to persons with disabilities facing injustices.

== History ==
=== Pre-colonial and colonial eras ===
In these eras, disability was characterized by traditional views and segregation. Disability was viewed through spiritual and moral lenses. Many communities attributed physical and cognitive impairments to witchcraft, ancestral spirits and angry gods or punishments for wrongdoing (curses), leading to social exclusion and harmful traditional practices. These beliefs shaped how families and communities treated people with disabilities, often limiting participation in social, cultural and economic activities in their communities. In this era, disability was not typically recognized as a social or human rights issue but as a personal problem of an individual which needed to be fixed.

=== Late 1800s–1960s ===
Following the arrival of missionaries in Uganda in the late 19th century, a landscape for persons with disabilities was altered. These missionaries established schools and charity-based services that is, for the first time provided some limited schooling and support, although initially access was minimal and often exclusionary. In 1968, parents of children with cerebral palsy organized to establish the Uganda Spastic Society in Mengo -one of the earliest disability focused associations. This society opened a primary school for children with physical impairments in 1969, a step towards formal education access to children with disabilities. In this era, persons with disabilities were seen as the "needy" -charity model.

=== Post-Independence era and Early Advocacy Organizations, 1960s–1980s ===
After Uganda's independence from Britain in 1962, unfortunately disability was still largely within the charity model and focused on care from religious institutions and families rather than society and rights. Early advocacy organizations began to form in the 1970s such as Uganda National Association for the Blind (UNAB) and the Uganda National Association for the Deaf (UNAD). However, political instability in the late 1970s and early 1980s interrupted and stunted momentum. However, a significant shift occurred in November 1987 with the establishment of National Union of Disabled Persons of Uganda (NUDIPU), which became a unifying force for the disability movements. It helped to coordinate advocacy across different impairment groups, and began pushing for broader inclusion, representation and policy reform.

=== 1990s–2000s, constitutional recognition and policy emergence ===
The 1995 Constitution of the Republic of Uganda paved the way for the emergence of other laws and policy favoring persons with disabilities in the country. In 2003, the National Council for Disability Act was passed, establishing a statutory body to coordinate disability programs and advocacy. Persons with Disabilities Act of 2006 went further, articulating rights and obligations related to education, health, rehabilitation and employment. It also established the National Council for Persons with Disabilities.

=== Post-2010 to present, International alignment and the rights based model ===
In 2008, Uganda ratified the United Nations Convention on Rights of Persons with Disabilities (UNCRPD), signaling a commitment to align her national laws with international human rights standards and shifting from a medical or charity model to social and rights based model. This commitment birthed the passing of the Persons with Disabilities Act 2020, which replaced the earlier of 2006 Act. This legislation addresses discrimination and mandates reasonable accommodation and accessibility requirements for employers and building owners.

Most recently, the revised National Policy on persons with disabilities (2023) seeks to mainstream disability inclusion across government sectors and strengthen implementation and coordination.

== See also ==
- Uganda at the Paralympics
