= New Partnership for Africa's Development E-School Program =

The New Partnership for Africa's Development E-School Program is included as a means to provide ICT equipment such as computers and internet access to all schools in member nations within The New Partnership for Africa's Development (NEPAD) program. NEPAD parents the E-School Program and is an economic program that aims to bring economic and social development to African nations and ensure 'Africa's Renewal'. The E-School Program began with Demonstration Projects and has developed further yet remains a work in progress in many countries, facing both criticism and support.

== Origins and goals ==
The E-School program was developed in 2003 at the African Economic Summit. The project aims to provide computers, internet access, and other Information and Communication Technology (ICT) to all schools in Africa within 10 years, under the NEPAD agreement. The main goal of the program is to expand students' ability to learn in schools through internet connection and technology access. The aim is to cover all high schools within 5 years of the start of implementation and all primary schools within 10 years, a total of some 600,000 schools. This is an initiative to provide more equality and access to education across African schools. The program does this by bringing techniques used elsewhere, ICT, to provide more academic opportunities for African children to succeed. NEPAD schools are unique from non-NEPAD schools in that they have significantly higher integration of ICTs, allowing children more opportunities for academic improvement.

At the World Economic Forum Africa Summit in Cape Town, it was announced that the first school to benefit from the program would be Bugulumbya Secondary School in the village of Busobya, Uganda.

== Projects ==
=== Demonstration Projects ===
The initial step in implementing the E-School Program the creation of 'Demonstration Projects' aimed to understand the most effective methods and the different situations which may be incurred along the implementation process. The main goals of these projects were to show "the costs, benefits, appropriateness and challenges of a satellite based network" which would be implemented under this program. These projects have been headed by "the private sector partners... AMD, Cisco, HP, Microsoft and Oracle". Each of these companies had a 'consortia' which contained other companies working on the initiative.

Six schools from 16 African countries participated in these Demo Projects, but some (Kenya, Ghana, Rwanda) had much more investment into their programs than others. The Demo Project was only intended to last one year but faced challenges, causing an extension. The project's aim was to discover the 'best practices' of implementing the program and how to do so most effectively. This demonstration project took place in 16 countries including: Algeria, Burkina Faso, Cameroon, Egypt, Gabon, Ghana, Kenya, Lesotho, Mali, Mauritius, Mozambique, Nigeria, Rwanda, Senegal, South Africa and Uganda. The schools involved in the Demonstration Projects were also able to utilize the ICT early on in the preliminary test stages of the project.

=== Other initiatives ===
==== Kenya ====
There have been implementations of the NEPAD E-School program in Kenya. One study was done to compare the learning opportunities and resources of NEPAD secondary schools versus non-NEPAD secondary schools in Kenya. In this study, measures of the integration of the provided Information and Computer Technology (ICT) and the successes across six provinces in Kenya. The researchers selected six schools of each type (NEPAD and non-NEPAD) and used a questionnaire to determine the level of success of the schools within the recent past of the schools. They found that e-learning had been much more successful in application in NEPAD schools since students and teachers in E-Schools had better teacher support in utilizing e-learning than non-NEPAD schools.

==== Rwanda ====
Rwanda has seen growth in their school programs over the past two decades. Additionally, Rwanda was one of the nations which received ICT under a 'Demonstration Project' in 2006 which allowed a chance to utilize new technology in the growing school systems. But, one study uses examples from Rwanda to claim the objectives of the e-schools program have not been met. This study cites the nation's lack of ability to fund such an expensive program in a nation with a developing infrastructure. Many schools find it difficult to fully utilize the ICTs provided by the E-School program due to lack of funding, teacher training, and knowledge about the ICTs themselves.

== Criticisms and next steps ==
As of 2012, not much change had been made towards the goal of the E-School Program. The countries which had the most initial investment in their schools by this program have seen the most success with the program. Many nations are still working to implement the program and utilize new ICT technologies in their school systems but have often found other obstacles, as mentioned above, in their way.

Poor African nations are often unable to invest enough money into the program to make actual change. The program is costly and many nations in Africa do not have enough money or infrastructure to put adequate investment into the program. This was the case in Rwanda, which was unable to fully utilize the program's resources.

The program is not deemed a failure but has faced many obstacles in its implementation, common in social projects in Africa. In the aforementioned study done in Kenya, researchers found one of the largest downfalls of the implementation of ICT into African schools to be the lack of teacher support and resources. Teachers are given general technology training through this program. However, they often have no additional training responses once this training is complete. This can be resolved through more investment in educational infrastructure at the most basic levels such as teacher training and school funding.

Many schools have also been critical of the post-demo project sustainability of the program. However, to combat this, the project and schools themselves have worked to create sustainability plans for the program and tweak the necessities of the plans. This was suggested in the Demonstration Project's initial roll out to provide a next step for E-schools.

== See also ==
- New Partnership for Africa's Development (NEPAD)
- African Union
