= National Union of Women with Disabilities of Uganda =

National Union of Women with Disabilities of Uganda (NUWODU) is a women led national organization responsible for disability inclusion, advocacy and promotion of rights of women persons with Disability in Uganda. The union is an umbrella organization which ensures all women with disability have access to fair justice, employment opportunities and participation in the national electoral process. It is a legally registered organization and fully complies with national laws. It is located in Kisaasi, a suburb of Kampala.

== Background ==
National Union of Women with Disabilities of Uganda was established in 1999 by a group of women with disabilities during a national conference held in Kampala. The goal of the organization is to address violations of the rights of women and girls with disabilities, double discrimination at employment centers and limited access to social services. NUWODU has run advocacy programs to advocate for the protections of the rights of women and girls with disabilities in Uganda through offering leadership training under the spotlight initiative. The organization reaches out to communities and trains them in knowing their rights to life as disabled persons.

== See also ==
- Esther Kyozira
- Albinism
- National Union of Persons with Disability in Uganda
