= National Union of Persons with Disability in Uganda =

- Established: November 14, 1987; 38 years ago
- CEO and Executive Director: Esther Kyozira
- Website: nudipu.org

National Union of Persons with Disability in Uganda (NUDIPU) is a national organization responsible for disability inclusion, advocacy and promotion of rights of Persons with Disability in Uganda. The union ensures all persons with Disability have access to fair justice, employment opportunities and participation in the national electoral process. The organization is led by CEO and Executive Director, Esther Kyozira who provides oversight management on vision and mission of the organization.

== Background ==
NUDIPU was established on 14 November 1987 to advocate for persons with disabilities to improve their livelihood and promote economic participation. The organization operates in all regions of the country, covering the Eastern Uganda, Western Uganda, Northern Uganda, and Central Uganda with a membership of 112 districts. NUDIPU conducts regional capacity building training to empower Persons with Disabilities on their right to access of information, organizational management, conflict resolutions and advocacy. The organization works at the intersection of promoting policy frameworks that protect the rights of persons with disabilities in Uganda.

== Legal frameworks ==
Internationally, as a member state to the United Nations, Uganda subscribes to the Convention on the Rights of Persons with Disabilities, which Uganda ratified to match its national framework through an Act of parliament and passed the Persons with Disability Act (2020) to promote the rights, inclusion and dignity of persons with disabilities in Uganda. The law also led to the establishment of the National Council for Persons with Disabilities (NCPD).

== Controversy ==
NUDIPU has urged government leaders who don't perform to be ousted from leadership positions.

== See also ==
- Albinism
- Esther Kyozira
