= Uro Care Hospital =

Private specialized hospital in Uganda

- Uro Care Hospital

Geography
- Location: Behind Bukomero Seven sisters, Nansana, Wakiso District, Central Region, Uganda
- Coordinates: 00°21′12″N 32°32′07″E

Organisation
- Care system: Private
- Type: Urology and Nephrology

Services
- Beds: 50

History
- Founded: 2017; 9 years ago

Links
- Website: Homepage
- Other links: List of hospitals in Uganda

Uro Care Hospital is a private, specialized healthcare facility in Uganda. It is a specialists' hospital and diagnostic centre focusing primarily on the areas of urology and nephrology. The facility opened by Stephen Watya is owned, operated and administered by Ugandan healthcare professionals.

== Location ==
The hospital is located in Nansana in Wakiso District off of the Kampala–Hoima Road, about 10 kilometres (6 mi) northwest of the central business district of Kampala, Uganda's capital city. This is approximately 6 kilometres (4 mi) by road, northwest of Mulago National Referral Hospital.

The geographical coordinates of Uro Care Hospital are: 0°21'12.0"N, 32°32'07.0"E (Latitude:0.353333; Longitude:32.535278).

== History ==
In 2006, Dr Stephen Watya, a consultant urologist, trained at Makerere University and the University of Cape Town, registered Uro Care Limited, as a private company limited by shares. In 2017, that company established Uro Care Hospital with focus on diseases of the kidneys, urinary bladder and the urinary tract.

== Hospital departments ==
The services offered at Uro Care Hospital, are dispensed under the following departments: 1. Operating Theatre 2. Inpatient Department 3. Outpatient Department 4. Laboratory 5. Pharmacy and 6. Imaging Department.

== Services ==
As of November 2020, the following services are on offer at Uro Care Hospital. The list is not exhaustive: 1. General Urological Surgery 2. Physician Anesthesia 3. Laparoscopic Surgery of Kidneys, Ureters, Urinary Bladder and Prostate 4. Laser Nephrological Surgery 5. Surgery for cancers of the Kidney, Bladder and Urinary Tract in Men, Women and Children.

== See also ==
- Ugandan Hospitals
- Richard Kanyerezi
- Kampala Hospital
- Dr. Ian Clarke
- Nakasero Hospital
