= Capital Shoppers =

Ugandan supermarket chain

Coordinates: 0.311250°N 32.579167°E

Capital Shoppers Limited
- Company type: Private Family Owned
- Industry: Retail trade
- Founded: 1997
- Headquarters: Kampala, Uganda
- Key people: Ponsiano Ngabirano; Chairman & CEO; Frank Ngamije; Human Resource Manager
- Products: Supermarkets
- Total assets: US$2 million (UGX:5 billion) (2014)
- Number of employees: 200+ (2021)
- Subsidiaries: In Uganda

Capital Shoppers Limited, commonly known as Capital Shoppers, is a Ugandan supermarket chain.

== Location ==
The Head Office of Capital Shoppers is located along Plot 2 Dastur Street, Kampala Central Division, in the city's central business district, adjacent to Nakasero Farmers' Market. The coordinates of Capital Shoppers Headquarters are:0°18'40.5"N, 32°34'45.0"E (Latitude:0.311250; Longitude:32.579167).

== Overview ==
The supermarket chain owns and operates four supermarkets in Uganda; all located in Kampala, the capital of Uganda, the third-largest economy in the East African Community. Capital Shoppers is the largest locally owned supermarket chain in the country. Founded in 1997, the family-owned store chain had a customer-royalty program that offered 4 percent rebate on purchases, the highest in the industry in Uganda at that time. The rebate program was discontinued in 2021 when the Uganda Revenue Authority introduced the Electronic Fiscal Receipting and Invoicing Solution (EFRIS) system, which does not recognize rebates.

== Branches ==
As of August 2014 the supermarket chain maintains branches at the following locations: (a) Central Kampala: Dastur Street, Nakasero Hill, Kampala (b) Nakawa Branch: Port Bell Road, Nakawa, Kampala (c) Ntinda Branch: Capital Shoppers Mall, Ntinda Road, Ntinda, Kampala and (d) Garden City Branch: Garden City Mall, Kampala.

== Ownership ==
Capital Shoppers is a wholly Ugandan, privately held company. As of November 2016, Ugandan media reports indicated that the supermarket chain is owned by Mr. and Mrs. Ngabirano.

== See also ==
- Kampala
- Carrefour
- Quality Supermarkets
- Uganda Economy
- Uganda Supermarkets
