= Simon Kagugube =

Ugandan lawyer, banker, and tax expert (1956–2020)

Doctor Simon Kagugube
- Born: 7 January 1956; Albert Cook Hospital, Mengo Kampala, Uganda
- Died: 15 February 2020 (aged 64); Nakasero Hospital, Nakasero, Kampala, Uganda
- Citizenship: Uganda
- Education: Makerere University (Bachelor of Laws); Law Development Centre (Diploma in Legal Practice); Yale University (Master of Laws) (Doctor of Juridical Science)
- Known for: Legal matters, Tax matters
- Title: Chairman of Uganda Revenue Authority and Monitor Publications Limited; Executive Director of Centenary Bank and Director of Nation Media Group

Simon Kagugube (7 January 1956 – 15 February 2020), was a Ugandan lawyer, corporate executive and taxation expert, who served as the Chairman of the board of directors at Uganda Revenue Authority (URA), Uganda's revenue collection agency.

He concurrently served as the Chairman of Monitor Publications in Uganda, and was a member of the board of directors at Nation Media Group, based in Kenya. Simultaneously, he was an executive director at Centenary Bank, a commercial bank in Uganda, and he sat on the bank's board of directors.

== Background and education ==
He was born in Uganda on 7 January 1956 and attended Namilyango Junior Primary School. For his secondary education, he studied at St. Mary's College Kisubi. He was admitted to Makerere University, Uganda's oldest and largest public university, where he obtained a Bachelor of Laws degree. He went on to obtain a Diploma in Legal practice, from the Law Development Centre. He was then admitted to the Ugandan Bar, as a practicing attorney.

His degree of Master of Laws in Corporation Law, Taxation and International Trade Systems, was awarded by Yale University, in the United States. He also held a Doctor of Science of Law, also awarded by Yale University. His doctoral specialization was in Immigration, Refugees and Asylum Law.

His other academic qualifications included a Certificate in Public Finance from University of Bath and a certificate in the Commonwealth Tax Inspectors’ course.

== Career ==
Dr Kagugube worked at the Uganda Revenue Authority, as Commissioner for Value Added Tax and while there, served temporarily as Deputy Commissioner General of the agency. At the time of his death, he was the chairman of the board at the tax agency.

In the early 2000s, he worked at PricewaterhouseCoopers Uganda as the Director of Tax and Legal Services, while simultaneously serving as the chairman of the board at Centenary Bank.

He was appointed to the Board of Nation Media Group, as an independent non-executive director, in September 2011. He concurrently served as the Chairman of the Board of Monitor Publications Limited in Uganda, a Nation Media Group subsidiary.

At the time of his death in February 2020, Kagugube was an Executive Director at Centenary Bank, a commercial bank in Uganda and was a member of the bank's board of directors.

== Illness and death ==
Kagugube visited Victoria Clinic on Lumumba Avenue, in Kampala, but collapsed on arrival, on 1 February 2020. He was transferred to nearby Nakasero Hospital, where he was diagnosed with a blocked coronary artery (heart attack).

He was then transferred that afternoon to the Uganda Heart Institute, where he underwent an emergency coronary bypass operation that was deemed successful. A pacemaker was also inserted in his heart to control an irregular rhythm. When he regained consciousness after the heart surgery, he was asked to select an institution where he could be monitored while waiting for sufficient recovery before flying him abroad for a cardiac rehabilitation program. He selected Nakasero Hospital.

While at Nakasero, he developed complications, including uncontrolled blood sugar (he was a diabetic), low blood pressure and kidney failure, requiring dialysis. Kagugube died on the afternoon of 15 February 2020, at Nakasero Hospital, in Kampala, where he had been admitted days before. He was buried at Mawagga Village, Mityana District, on 18 February 2020.

== Family ==
He married wife, Eva Kagugube on 9 April 1983 at Christ the King Catholic Church, in Kampala, Uganda.

== Other considerations ==
Kagugube was the president of the East African School of Taxation, a private institution based in Kampala.

== See also ==
- Economy of Uganda
- Patience Tumusiime Rubagumya
