= Case Medical Centre =

Coordinates: 00°19′28″N 32°34′30″E

Geography
- Location: 67 - 71 Buganda Road; Central Division, Kampala, Central Region, Uganda

Organisation
- Care system: Private
- Type: General

Services
- Emergency department: II
- Beds: 80+

History
- Founded: 1995

Links
- Website: Homepage
- Other links: Hospitals in Uganda

Case Medical Centre, also known as Case Hospital, is an urban, private, upscale, tertiary hospital in Kampala, the capital of Uganda and the largest city in that country. It is one of the few upscale private tertiary care hospitals in the city. The other four hospitals are: International Hospital Kampala, Kampala Hospital, Nakasero Hospital, UMC Victoria Hospital and Paragon Hospital.

== Location ==
The hospital is located at 67 - 71 Buganda Road, on Nakasero Hill, in Kampala Central Division, immediately north of Kampala's central business district. The coordinates of Case Medical Centre are:0°19'28.0"N, 32°34'30.0"E (Latitude:0.3244; Longitude:32.5750).

== Overview ==
The hospital is a private upscale tertiary care hospital; one of the five most upscale private healthcare facilities in Kampala, Uganda's capital. Those hospitals were created during the last 20 years, beginning with International Hospital Kampala in 1996. They aim to bridge the gap in specialized tertiary healthcare delivery in the country and to serve that segment of Uganda's population that has been seeking the missing services from outside Uganda. Case Hospital owns and Operates Case MedCare Insurance Limited, a wholly owned Health Maintenance Organization.

== History ==
In 1995, a group of specialist physicians and surgeons began to attend to patients in an outpatient clinic out of rented premises on Bombo Road in downtown Kampala. Over time, the caseload grew and the services offered increased. During the early 2000s, land was acquired at the present location, and a brand new eight-story hospital building was constructed. The outpatient department (Case Clinic), is still operational and housed in the hospital tower.

== See also ==
- List of hospitals in Uganda
- International Hospital Kampala
- Kampala Hospital
- Nakasero Hospital
- Paragon Hospital
