= Uganda Inspectorate of Government Towers =

Ugandan building

- Location within Kampala

General information
- Type: Commercial
- Location: 71–75 Yusuf Lule Road, Kampala, Uganda
- Coordinates: 00°19′10″N 32°35′26″E
- Construction started: July 2019
- Completed: 2023 (Expected)

Technical details
- Floor count: 15

Design and construction
- Architects: Ssentoogo & Partners

Uganda Inspectorate of Government Towers is a building under construction, in Kampala, the capital and largest city of Uganda.

== Location ==
The skyscraper is located between 71–75 Yusuf Lule Road and 24–26 Clement Hill Road, on Nakasero Hill, in the Central Division of Kampala, Uganda's capital city. The geographical coordinates of the Uganda Inspectorate of Government Towers are: 0°19'10.0"N, 32°35'26.0"E (Latitude:0.319444; Longitude:32.590556).

== Overview ==
The high-rise consists of a 15-level office tower and parking space for 205 automobiles on three levels. When completed, the building will serve as the headquarters of the Uganda Inspectorate of Government, where the agency will accommodate the 325 employees on staff, as of July 2019.

The office tower will have: 1. a 500-seater conference hall 2. meeting rooms for investigations 3. a detention facility for corrupt officials 4. a forensic laboratory and 5. an exhibit store.

== History ==
In 2005, the Uganda Inspectorate of Government acquired a piece of real estate, measuring 1.2 acres (4,900 m^{2}) of land from the Uganda Post Office after paying USh5.4 billion (approximately US$2.2 million at that time).

Construction is budgeted at US$19 million (approximately USh69 billion in 2019 money). In July 2019, after fourteen years of planning, a ground-breaking ceremony was held at the present location. A consortium comprising Roko Construction Limited, a Ugandan construction company and its Rwandan subsidiary, ROKO Construction Rwanda Limited, was awarded the construction contract. Completion is expected in 2023.

The work is 100 percent funded by the Government of Uganda. The new office tower will save the government at least Shs2.5 billion (approximately $680,000) in annual rent.

== See also ==
- KCCA
- Kampala
- Central Kampala
- Tall Kampala Buildings
