= Kampala Hospital =

Private hospital in Uganda

- Kampala Hospital
- Location within Kampala

Geography
- Location: 6C Makindu Close, Kololo, Kampala, Central Region, Uganda
- Coordinates: 00°19′59″N 32°35′04″E

Organisation
- Care system: Private
- Type: General

Services
- Beds: 100

History
- Founded: 2007; 19 years ago

Links
- Website: Homepage
- Other links: List of hospitals in Uganda

Kampala Hospital is a private healthcare facility in Uganda. It is a specialists' hospital and diagnostic centre. Kampala Hospital was the first hospital in Uganda to install a Magnetic Resonance Imaging (MRI) machine and a CT Scanner. For almost five years it was the only hospital in the country, providing these services.

== Location ==
The hospital is located in Kololo in Kampala Central Division, about 3 kilometres (2 mi) north of the central business district of the city. This is approximately 3 kilometres (2 mi), by road, southeast of Mulago National Referral Hospital. The coordinates of Kampala Hospital are: 00°19'59.0"N, 32°35'04.0"E (Latitude:0.333056, Longitude:32.584444).

== History ==
Beginning in 2000, a number of physicians, surgeons, businessmen and community leaders came up with the idea of starting a private hospital in Kampala to address the need for quality healthcare and to offer medical services that were only available in foreign countries like Kenya, South Africa, India, United Kingdom and United States. The founders and investor-owners of the hospital include Richard Kanyerezi, Jack Luyombya, Edward Kigonya, Nelson Senkaatuuka, John Nsibambi, James Batwala, Leo Kibirango and Ntwatwa Kyagulanyi. They pooled resources, including taking out personal loans and mortgages to fund the opening of the hospital in 2007. The hospital provides full laboratory services. It still is undergoing expansion to provide more specialty services and increase its bed capacity. Kampala Hospital is one of five upscale, tertiary hospitals in the city of Kampala that provide quality healthcare at a price; the others being Case Medical Centre on Buganda Road, International Hospital Kampala in Namuwongo, Nakasero Hospital on Akii Bua Road and Paragon Hospital in Bugolobi.

== Services offered ==
The services offered at KHL include the following: 1. Emergency Ambulance 2. Emergency services 3. Outpatient Care 4. Laboratory 5. Trauma surgery 6. Pediatrics 7. Physiotherapy 8. Antenatal care 9. Pharmacy.

== Specialties ==
As of April 2015, the following speciality services are available at KHL. The list is not exhaustive: 1. General Surgery 2. Physician Anaesthesia 3. Obstetrics & Gynaecology 4. Paediatrics 5. Neonatology 6. Orthopaedics 7. Neurosurgery 8. Medical Oncology 9. Surgical Oncology 10. Urology 11. 11. Cardiology 12. Otolaryngology 13. Plastic Surgery 14. Reconstructive Surgery 15. Internal Medicine 16. Family Medicine 17. Radiology 18. Psychiatry 19. Endoscopy 20. Colposcopy.

== See also ==
- KCCA
- Ugandan Hospitals
- Richard Kanyerezi
- International Hospital
- Dr. Ian Clarke
- Nakasero Hospital
