= Uganda Business Facilitation Centre =

Government building in Uganda

- Location within Kampala

General information
- Type: Government offices
- Location: 1 Baskerville Avenue, Kololo, Kampala; Uganda
- Coordinates: 00°19′44″N 32°36′04″E
- Construction started: 2018
- Completed: 2022
- Cost: US$3 million

Design and construction
- Architects: Ssentoogo and Partners
- Main contractor: China National Aero Technology International Engineering Corporation

The Uganda Business Facilitation Centre (UBFC) is a government office building in Uganda's capital city of Kampala. The centre is intended to house the offices of key business-related departments, including the Uganda Registration Services Bureau, the Uganda Investment Authority, and the Capital Markets Authority. The aim of housing these and other government agencies under one roof is to increase their effectiveness and to improve service delivery to the business community. Ultimately, these actions are expected to improve Uganda's ranking in the ease of doing business.

== Location ==
The centre is located at 1 Baskerville Avenue, in the neighborhood of Kololo, in the Kampala Central Division, in Uganda's capital city of Kampala, approximately 4 kilometres (2 mi), by road north-east of the city's center. The geographical coordinates of the center: 0°19'44.0"N, 32°36'04.0"E (Latitude:0.328889; Longitude:32.601111).

== Overview ==
The UBFC is a government centre, whose construction was funded by the government of Uganda, with facilitation from the World Bank to house the relevant government agencies responsible for registration and licensing of businesses, in an effort to speed up the registration and operationalization of businesses, from the current three weeks an expected four hours.

The centre will house key government agencies that support business registration and licensing. In addition to the three lead institutions, these other institutions will maintain offices in the centre, including the Uganda National Social Security Fund, Uganda Export Promotion Board, Kampala Capital City Authority, and Uganda Ministry of Local Government. Others include the Uganda Revenue Authority, National Identification and Registration Authority, and Uganda Ministry of Lands, Housing and Urban Development.

== Construction ==
Construction started in January 2018 and was expected to last 18 months. China National Aero Technology International Engineering Corporation was the lead contractor. In February 2021, the completion date was projected to be May 2021.

The Uganda Registration Services Bureau was the first government agency to relocate to the newly completed building, starting on 20 September 2022. The Uganda Investment Authority and the Capital Markets Authority are expected to follow by relocating their head offices to this building later in 2022. The remaining government agencies will open operational branch offices at this location as well.
