= Rose Clarke Nanyonga =

Ugandan nurse and academic administrator

Professor Rose Clarke Nanyonga
- Born: 1971 (age 54–55); Bamunanika, Uganda
- Citizenship: Uganda
- Education: Arkansas Tech University (Bachelor of Science in Nursing); Baylor University (Master of Science in Nursing); Yale University (Doctor of Philosophy)
- Occupations: Nurse, academic, university administrator
- Years active: 2007–present
- Title: Vice chancellor Clarke International University

Rose Clarke Nanyonga (née Nanyonga; born c. 1971) is a Ugandan nurse, academic and current vice chancellor of Clarke International University, a private institution of higher education in Uganda.

== Background and education ==
She was born in Bamunanika, in Luweero District, Buganda Region of Uganda, circa 1972. In 1989, after attending local primary schools, she migrated to Kiwoko, in present-day Nakaseke District, approximately 52 kilometres (32 mi) to the north-west of Bamunanika.

At Kiwoko Hospital, she met and was befriended by Dr. Ian Clarke, a physician and Christian missionary, originally from Northern Ireland, and his wife Robbie Clarke. The Clarkes, who eventually legally adopted Rose, supported her desire to train as a nurse. She obtained a Bachelor of Science in Nursing degree from the Arkansas Tech University. She followed that with a Master of Science in Nursing, from Baylor University. In 2015, she was awarded a Doctor of Philosophy degree by the Yale School of Nursing.

== Career ==
Starting as a nursing assistant at Kiwoko Hospital in 1989, Nanyonga pursued further training in that profession, with the assistance and guidance of her adoptive parents, Dr. Ian Clarke and Robbie Clarke. She was later employed at International Medical Centre (IMC), one of the medical businesses founded by the Clarkes, beginning in 2005. Later, she was promoted to the position of Director of Clinical Operations at International Hospital Kampala (IHK) in Kampala, Uganda's capital city.

From August 2015 until June 2017, Nanyonga concurrently served as the deputy vice chancellor and acting vice chancellor of International Health Sciences University, which re-branded in 2017 to Clarke International University. From 3 July 2017, she serves as the substantive vice chancellor of Clarke University.

== Other considerations ==
In 2009, Nanyonga pioneered a grassroots campaign to end child sacrifice in Uganda. She serves as a board member of Narrow Road, an American non-profit that champions and advocates for children's rights and is active in Uganda and Honduras.

She is also a senior faculty member at the university, teaching Health Policy and Planning as well as Advanced Strategic Management at graduate level.

== Succession table as vice chancellor of Clarke International University ==
| Preceded by Nick Wooding; 2010 – 2015 | Vice chancellor of Clarke International University; 2017 – 2027 | Succeeded by To be determined 2027 – 2032 |
