= Christ the King Catholic Church =

Parish church in Kampala, Uganda

Christ The King Catholic Church

Religion
- Affiliation: Roman Catholic
- Diocese: Archdiocese of Kampala, Parish of Christ The King
- Ecclesiastical or organizational status: Parish church
- Leadership: Archbishop: Paul Ssemogerere; Parish Priest: Gerald Kalumba
- Year consecrated: 1930

Location
- Location: 3 Colvile Street; Kampala, Uganda
- Interactive map of Christ The King Catholic Church
- Coordinates: 00°18′52″N 32°35′04″E

Architecture
- Architects: Ssentoogo & Partners Architects
- Completed: 1930
- Capacity: 900 (Current); 1,500 (Planned)

Christ The King Catholic Church, also Christ The King Church, is the parish church of Christ The King Catholic Parish in Kampala, the capital and largest city of Uganda.

== Location ==
The church is located at the junction of Colville Street and Kimathi Avenue, on Nakasero Hill, in the Central Division of Kampala. The church property is bounded by Portal Avenue to the south. The coordinates of the church are 0°18'52.0"N, 32°35'04.0"E (Latitude:0.314444; Longitude:32.584444).

== Overview ==
The church serves Christ The King Catholic Parish, which covers Nakasero, Kololo, and Old Kampala. Many worshippers, however, come from other parts of the city and surrounding neighborhoods to pray at this location. As of September 2016, the seating capacity inside the church was about 600. Because of the size of the congregation, there is insufficient space inside the church to accommodate all the worshippers. During mass and other large events, tents are erected outside the church where worshippers follow the proceedings on loudspeakers.

== History ==
The church was built in 1930 by the immigrant Goan community who had come to Uganda to construct the Uganda Railway. In 1972, following the expulsion of Ugandan Asians by dictator Idi Amin, the church underwent a modest expansion to its present dimensions.

== Expansion ==
In 1992, plans were initiated to enlarge the church to accommodate more worshippers. The parish began putting aside some funds to cover the expansion costs that year. In 2013, the Kampala Capital City Authority (KCCA) rejected the expansion plans submitted that year because the plans lacked parking space.

Beginning in November 2016, the church will begin a multi-phased expansion and renovation that will last until 2018. The seating capacity will be increased from the current 600 to 1,500. The architectural plans were drawn by Ssentoogo & Partners Architects. The construction contract was awarded to Seyani Brothers, a Ugandan construction company. The budgeted construction costs are UGX:8.8 billion. As of October 2016, about 78 percent of the needed funds (approx. UGX 6.864 billion), had been collected, leaving a balance of about UGX 1.936 billion. The renovations are expected to conclude in April 2018.

== See also ==
- Kampala District
- Roman Catholicism in Uganda
- Rubaga Cathedral
