= IHK =

IHK may refer to:

- Association of German Chambers of Industry and Commerce, Industrie- und Handelskammer, German chamber of commerce
- Engineering College of Copenhagen (Ingeniørhøjskolen i København)
- International Hospital Kampala
- East Helsinki Hockey (Finnish: Itä-Helsingin Kiekko), a Finnish ice hockey club in East Helsinki
