= Francis Drobniewski =

British microbiologist

- Occupations: Microbiologist, physician, and academic

Academic background
- Education: M.A. Ph.D. M.B.B.S. M.Sc. DTM&H
- Alma mater: Trinity College Dublin; University of Cambridge; St Bartholomew's Hospital Medical College; London School of Hygiene and Tropical Medicine

Academic work
- Institutions: Imperial College London

Francis Drobniewski is a British microbiologist, physician, and academic. He is professor of Global Health and Tuberculosis at Imperial College London.

Drobniewski's research focuses on the molecular diagnosis and epidemiology of tuberculosis (TB) and other respiratory infections, including multidrug-resistant forms and their implications for treatment and public health. He is a fellow of the Royal Society of Biology, the European Society of Clinical Microbiology and Infectious Diseases, the American Academy of Microbiology, and the UK Royal College of Pathologists.

== Education ==
Drobniewski attended high school at St Joseph's Academy, Blackheath. He completed his M.A. at Trinity College Dublin in 1983, followed by a Ph.D. from the University of Cambridge in 1986. Later, in 1991, he earned his MB BS from St Bartholomew's Hospital Medical College, and an M.Sc. and Diploma in Tropical Medicine and Hygiene from the London School of Hygiene and Tropical Medicine in 1993.

== Career ==
Following his Ph.D. at the University of Cambridge, Drobniewski began his academic career as a professor at King's College London in 2000, and later joined Queen Mary University of London in 2005. Since 2013, he has been a professor of Global Health and Tuberculosis at Imperial College London.

Drobniewski was director of the UK Public Health Laboratory Service, National Mycobacterium (TB) Reference Laboratory from 1996 to 2015. He was elected president of the European Society for Mycobacteriology from 2006 to 2007. In 2006, he directed Health Sciences Research. He was also the member and then Chair of the WHO European Laboratory initiative on TB, HIV and Viral Hepatitis, and worked as a member of the WHO Global Strategic and Technical Advisory Group (STAG) in 2008. He is a founding member of European Center for Disease Control (ECDC) European TB Reference Laboratory Network since 2009. He has also held advisory and governance roles, including working as a member of the NICE Guideline Development Group for Tuberculosis, member of the British Thoracic Society National Clinical MDR-TB Advisory Panel, Trustee-Director of Peter Sowerby Foundation and a NICE-TAC member.

== Research ==
Drobniewski's research focuses on microbiology, highlighting molecular diagnostics, drug resistance, and management of tuberculosis and respiratory infections. His work has investigated genotyping methods such as spoligotyping and variable number tandem repeats (VNTRs), and has used whole genome sequencing (WGS) of TB strains in understanding of the evolution and transmission of TB during outbreaks in multiple countries. His work has identified associations between pathogen genotypes, drug resistance, and lineage across different geographical population groups, including patterns specific to the Beijing lineage. In collaborative studies, he used whole-genome sequencing (WGS) to analyze TB drug resistance and transmission and contributed to the development of non-microbiological genotypic-prediction of first line anti-TB drugs from cultured isolates, and supported their use in routine diagnostic services.

Drobniewski's work contributed to the understanding of within-host evolution in chronically ill patients and the role of compensatory mutations in bacterial fitness. He has evaluated the performance and reliability of rapid detection methods like nucleic acid amplification and real-time PCR His studies have also addressed other pathogens, including Bacillus cereus, and their involvement in severe infections and foodborne illness.

Drobniewski's studies have emphasized the need for improved treatment options for tuberculosis.

== Awards and honors ==
- 2014 – Fellow, Royal Society of Biology
- 2017 – Fellow, European Society of Clinical Microbiology and Infectious Diseases (ESCMID)
- 2025 – Fellow, American Academy of Microbiology

== Selected articles ==
- Drobniewski, F. A. (1993). "Bacillus cereus and related species". Clinical Microbiology Reviews. 6 (4): 324–338. doi:10.1128/CMR.6.4.324. PMC 358292. PMID 8269390.
- Drobniewski, F. A.; Watterson, S. A.; Wilson, S. M.; Harris, G. S. (2000). "A clinical, microbiological and economic analysis of a national service for the rapid molecular diagnosis of tuberculosis and rifampicin resistance in Mycobacterium tuberculosis". Journal of Medical Microbiology. 49 (3): 271–278. doi:10.1099/0022-1317-49-3-271. PMID 10707947.
- Baker, Lucy; Brown, Tim; Maiden, Martin C.; Drobniewski, Francis (2004). "Silent nucleotide polymorphisms and a phylogeny for Mycobacterium tuberculosis". Emerging Infectious Diseases. 10 (9): 1568–1577. doi:10.3201/eid1009.040046. PMC 3320301. PMID 15498158.
- Dinnes, J; Deeks, J; Kunst, H; Gibson, A; Cummins, E; Waugh, N; Drobniewski, F; Lalvani, A (2007). "A systematic review of rapid diagnostic tests for the detection of tuberculosis infection". Health Technol Assess. 11 (3): 1–196. doi:10.3310/hta11030. PMID 17266837.
- Martineau, Adrian R; Timms, Peter M; Bothamley, Graham H; Hanifa, Yasmeen; Islam, Kamrul; Claxton, Alleyna P; Packe, Geoffrey E; Moore-Gillon; et al. (2011). "High-dose vitamin D(3) during intensive-phase antimicrobial treatment of pulmonary tuberculosis: a double-blind randomised controlled trial". Lancet. 377 (9761): 242–250. doi:10.1016/S0140-6736(10)61889-2. PMC 4176755. PMID 21215445.
- Casali, N; Nikolayevskyy, V; Balabanova, Y; Harris, SR; Ignatyeva, O; Kontsevaya, I; Corander, J; et al. (2014). "Evolution and transmission of drug-resistant tuberculosis in a Russian population". Nature Genetics. 46 (3): 279–286. doi:10.1038/ng.2878. PMC 3939361. PMID 24464101.
- Walker, Timothy M; Kohl, Thomas A; Omar, Shaheed V; Hedge, Jessica; Del Ojo Elias, Carlos; Bradley, Phelim; Iqbal, Zamin; et al. (2015). "Whole-genome sequencing for prediction of Mycobacterium tuberculosis drug susceptibility and resistance: a retrospective cohort study". Lancet Infect Dis. 15 (10): 1193–1202. doi:10.1016/S1473-3099(15)00062-6. PMC 4579482. PMID 26116186.
- Casali, Nicola; Broda, Agnieszka; Harris, Simon R; Parkhill, Julian; Brown, Timothy; Drobniewski, Francis (2016). "Whole Genome Sequence Analysis of a Large Isoniazid-Resistant Tuberculosis Outbreak in London: A Retrospective Observational Study". PLOS Med. 13 (10) e1002137. doi:10.1371/journal.pmed.1002137. PMC 5049847. PMID 27701423.
- Balabanova, Yanina; Ignatyeva, Olga; Fiebig, Lena; Riekstina, Vija; Danilovits, Manfred; Jaama, Kadri; Davidaviciene, Edita; et al. (2016). "Survival of patients with multidrug-resistant TB in Eastern Europe: what makes a difference?". Thorax. 71 (9): 854–861. doi:10.1136/thoraxjnl-2015-207638. PMID 27012887.
- Abubakar, Ibrahim; Drobniewski, Francis; Southern, Jo; Sitch, Alice J; et al. (2018). "Prognostic value of interferon-γ release assays and tuberculin skin test in predicting the development of active tuberculosis (UK PREDICT TB): a prospective cohort study". Lancet Infect Dis. 18 (10): 1077–1087. doi:10.1016/S1473-3099(18)30355-4. PMC 6192014. PMID 30174209.
- Surkova, Elena; Nikolayevskyy, Vladyslav; Drobniewski, Francis (2020). "False-positive COVID-19 results: hidden problems and costs". Lancet Respir Med. 8 (12): 1167–1168. doi:10.1016/S2213-2600(20)30453-7. PMC 7524437. PMID 33007240.
- Hedberg, Pontus; Parczewski, Milosz; Serwin, Karol; Marchetti, Giulia; Bai, Francesca; Ole Jensen, Björn-Erik; Pereira, Joana P V; Drobniewski, Francis; et al. (2024). "In-hospital mortality during the wild-type, alpha, delta, and omicron SARS-CoV-2 waves: a multinational cohort study in the EuCARE project". Lancet Reg Health Eur. 38 100855. doi:10.1016/j.lanepe.2024.100855. PMC 10928271. PMID 38476753.
