= Olive Kigongo =

Ugandan businesswoman, entrepreneur and corporate executive

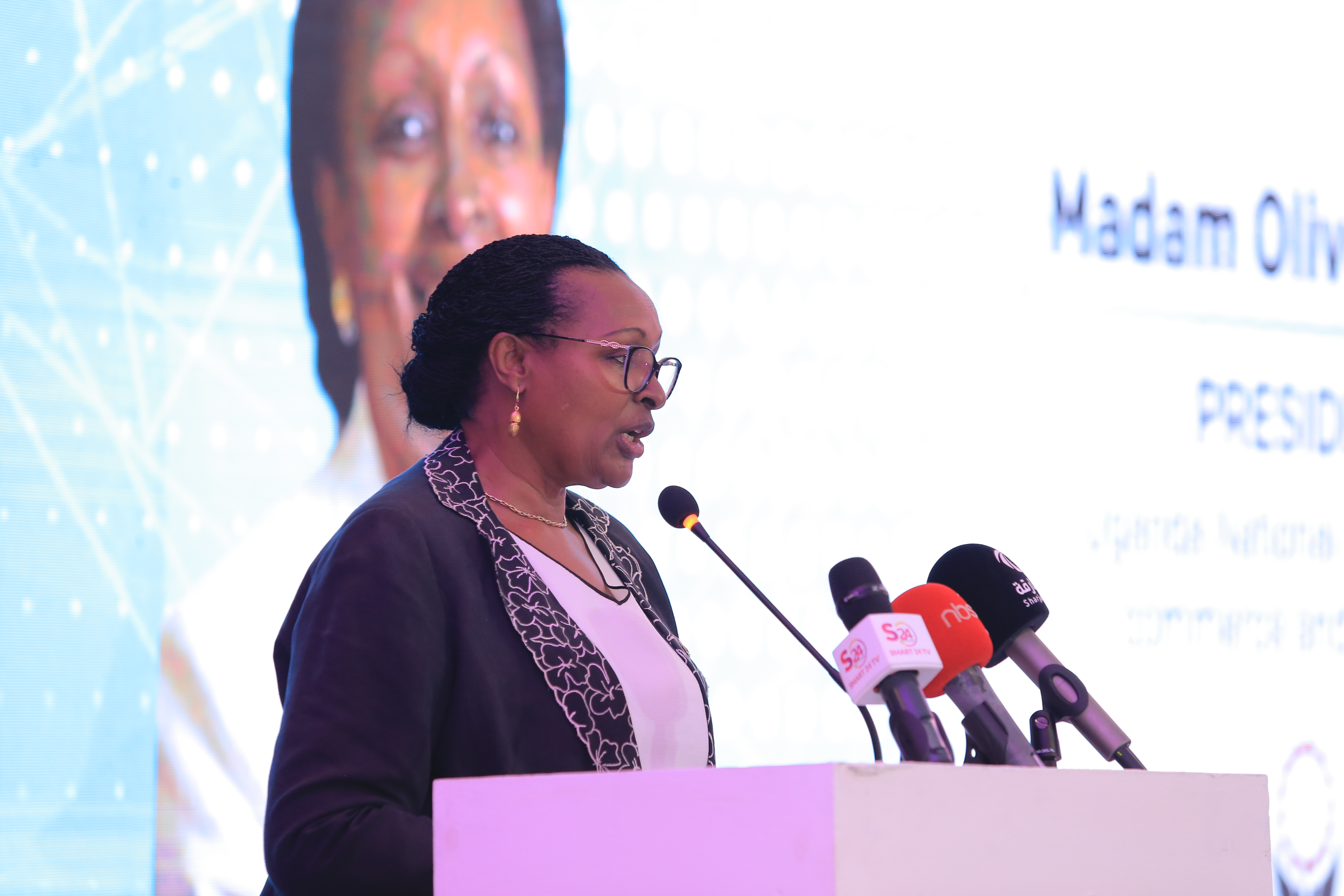
- President Olive Zaitun Kigongo giving a speech at a Kenya-Uganda Trade Mission
- Born: Mbarara District, Uganda
- Citizenship: Uganda
- Occupations: Businesswoman, Entrepreneur and Corporate executive
- Years active: Since 1987
- Title: President & Chief Executive Officer of Uganda National Chamber of Commerce and Industry

Olive Zaitun Kigongo (née Olive Makambera; born 1954), is a Ugandan businesswoman, entrepreneur and corporate executive, who serves as the president and chief executive officer (CEO) of the Uganda National Chamber of Commerce and Industry.

== Background and early life ==
Olive was born in Mbarara District, in the Western Region of Uganda. In 1987, one year after the National Resistance Movement (NRM) captured power in Uganda, Olive met Al Hajji Moses Kigongo, the vice chairperson of the NRM and the two started living together. Moses provided resources and Olive supervised the construction of a residential house at 13 Kololo Hill Drive, in the upscale neighborhood of Kololo, in Uganda's capital city of Kampala. In 1990, three years from the start of construction, the house was completed. The two of them moved into the residence and started to raise a family.

== Career ==
In 2002, Olive Zaitun Kigongo was elected as the first woman president of the Uganda National Chamber of Commerce and Industry. As of January 2018, she is still the leader of the organisation, formed in 1933, although her leadership has come under criticism and challenge.

She is the longest serving member of the EACCIA Board, serving as a founding member in September 2005, together with the leaders of Kenya and Tanzania chambers.

== Family ==
Olive Kigongo lived for over 26 years with Moses Kigongo, a high-ranking politician in the ruling National Resistance Movement political party. She is the mother of five children. According to court papers, in 1992, the couple performed a customary wedding ceremony called Okuhingira, at her parents' home in Western Uganda, however Al Hajji Moses Saku Kigongo disputes that. She changed her name from Olive Makambera to Olive Kigongo. The couple developed differences in their business and personal relationships, they separated and then sued each other. In 2016 they failed to reach a settlement agreement about their shared hotel and apartment properties.

In a 2015 transaction orchestrated by her cousin, Nathan Kajwangye in Congo, Olive was scammed for multimillion gold pieces; she had hoped to use the funds to finance her legal efforts against her estranged husband.

== Other considerations ==
She is the founder and chairman of the board of directors of "Amagara Skincare Limited", a cosmetics manufacturer based in Kampala, Uganda. Olive owns 15 percent of Mosa Courts Suites, a residential apartment complex, on Nakasero Hill. The remaining 85 percent is owned by Al Hajji Moses Kigongo.

== See also ==
- Angela Ndambuki
- Amelia Kyambadde
- Jolly Kaguhangire
