= Insurance Services of America =

Insurance brokerage company

- Company type: Independent
- Industry: Insurance, Travel Insurance, Short-Term Medical Insurance
- Founded: 2011
- Founder: Graham Bates
- Headquarters: Arizona, Gilbert, USA
- Area served: United States
- Key people: Graham Bates (President); Adam Bates (Vice President); Aaron Bates (Client Advisor & Plan Specialist); Grace Morrow (Group Plan Specialist); Amy Bates Sullivan (Individual Plan Specialist)
- Products: Atlas Travel Series, HCC Short-Term Medical, RoundTrip, Citizen Secure, Global Navigator, Inbound Immigrant, The Bridge, Health Essential, Student Secure, Global Citizen, Liaison Majestic, Day Tripper, etc.
- Owner: Graham Bates
- Website: www.insurancefortrips.com

Insurance Services of America is an independent insurance brokerage specializing in insurance services, international health insurance, and short-term medical insurance for US citizens.

In addition to working directly with clients, the brokerage is a managing general agent (MGA) with over 4,000 licensed insurance agents and agencies throughout the United States who are contracted to sell the insurance products.

Insurance Services of America is headquartered in Gilbert, Arizona with other offices in Carlsbad, California as well as Boulder, Colorado.

== History ==
Headquartered in Gilbert, Arizona, Insurance Services of America is family-owned and operated. The company has been an accredited member of the Better Business Bureau since December 15, 2005.

Its principal owner is Graham Bates, a veteran of the US Army who entered the insurance business in 1970 and worked in various private and governmental roles related to insurance. The company employs other members of the Bates family.

=== Awards ===
- Best of Gilbert, 2012
- Seven Corners, Inc. Top Producer, 2001–2008

=== Aaron Bates ===
One of the Bates sons, Aaron Bates, is a licensed insurance agent who works at the brokerage. Prior to his career in insurance, Aaron Bates served in the US Special Forces and spent several months stationed in South Korea, where he was born. The events surrounding his discovery of his biological father, who was serving time on death row in a South Korean prison, inspired the making of the film My Father (released in 2007).

== Insurance companies ==
Insurance Services of America is an independent brokerage firm and as such sells insurance products from a variety of insurance companies including:

- HCC Medical Insurance Services (HCC)
- Seven Corners
- Azimuth Risk Solutions
- Highway To Health (HTH)/GeoBlue
- Petersen International Underwriters
- International Medical Group (IMG)
- Health Insurance Innovations
- General Agent Center
