= Nakasero Hospital =

Private hospital in Uganda

- Location within Kampala

Geography
- Location: Nakasero, Central Division, Kampala, Central Region, Uganda
- Coordinates: 00°19′37″N 32°34′46″E

Organisation
- Care system: Private, For-profit
- Type: General

Services
- Emergency department: III
- Beds: 100+

History
- Founded: 2009; 17 years ago

Links
- Website: Homepage
- Other links: Hospitals in Uganda

Nakasero Hospital Limited, commonly referred to as Nakasero Hospital, is a private for-profit hospital in Kampala, the capital of Uganda. The hospital is one of five private upscale hospitals in the city; the others being International Hospital Kampala in Namuwongo, Paragon Hospital in Bugolobi, Case Medical Centre in Kampala Central Division and Kampala Hospital in Kololo.

== Location ==
The address of the hospital is 14A Akii Bua Road, Nakasero Hill, Kampala. It is located on Nakasero Hill, in Kampala Central Division, about 2.5 kilometres (1.6 mi) north of the city's central business district.

This is approximately 2 kilometres (1 mi), south of Mulago National Referral Hospital. The coordinates of the hospital are 0°19'37.0"N, 32°34'46.0"E (Latitude:0.326944; Longitude:32.579444).

== Overview ==
The hospital is a private upscale hospital; one of the five most exclusive private healthcare facilities in Kampala, Uganda's capital. Those hospitals have been established over the last 20 years, beginning with International Hospital Kampala in 1996, to address the gap in specialized tertiary healthcare delivery in the country and to serve that segment of Uganda's population that has been seeking the missing services from outside Uganda. After disagreements with the Uganda Insurers Association, an industry group, Nakasero Hospital established Nakasero HealthCare Limited, one of the only two hospital-owned health maintenance organizations in Uganda.

== History ==
Nakasero Hospital opened its outpatient department in March 2009 and the inpatient wards were opened in July 2009. The privately owned hospital is the brainchild of about 20 medical doctors, the majority of whom are specialists, from inside and outside Uganda, who pooled their resources and invested in the hospital. In 2010, the hospital borrowed US$3 millions worth of Ugandan shillings from the International Finance Corporation (IFC), an arm of the World Bank, to "increase access to quality health care, create jobs for medical professionals, and introduce new standards of clinical and patient care in the country". In April 2015, the hospital began a public fundraising drive to enable more women access free fistula repair surgeries. This program saw over 150 women access free surgeries and recuperation and completely healed from obestetric fistula that was quite prevalent in the rural areas of the country.

== Expansion ==
In June 2019, at the occasion of marking the 10th anniversary of the founding of the hospital, Dr. Edward Rukwaro, the then hospital's chief executive officer, announced that the hospital was to undergo major renovations and expansion, to the tune of US$10 million. This expansion commenced in october 2021, delayed majorly by the COVID 19 pandemic. The expansion has expanded some key departments that include (a) Consultants Plaza (b) Critical Care (ICU/HDU/NICU) (c) Inpatient ward with a target of attaining 147 beds (d) Paediatrics (both outpatient and inpatient) (e) Basement vehicle parkeing space.

== See also ==
- KCCA
- Nakasero Hill
- Central Kampala
- Ugandan Hospitals
- IHK
- Kampala Hospital
