= Quality Supermarkets =

Ugandan supermarket chain

Coordinates: 00°19′00″N 32°34′12″E

Quality Supermarkets Limited
- Type: Private Family Owned
- Industry: Retail trade
- Founded: 1980
- Headquarters: Kampala, Uganda
- Key people: Apollo Mutungi; Chairman & CEO; Mary Mutungi; Managing Director; Diana Baguma; Director
- Products: Supermarkets
- Subsidiaries: In Uganda

Quality Supermarkets is a Ugandan supermarket chain.

== Location ==
The head office of Quality Supermarket is located at 4 Martin Road, Old Kampala, Kampala Central Division, in the city's central business district.

== Overview ==
The supermarket chain owns and operates four supermarkets outlets in Uganda; all located in Kampala, the capital of Uganda, or its suburbs. Uganda is the third-largest economy in the East African Community. Quality Supermarkets is one of the largest locally owned supermarket chains in the country. Founded as a roadside grocery store in 1980, the company was incorporated on 11 August 1994. The family-owned store chain is managed and operated by the family that founded the store chain.

== Branches ==
As of September 2023 the supermarket chain maintains branches at the following locations:

- Central Kampala - 4 Martin Street, Old Kampala, Kampala
- Lubowa Branch - Quality Shopping Village, Lubowa, Wakiso District
- Kitende Branch - Kitende, Entebbe Road
- Naalya Branch - Quality Shopping Mall, Naalya-Kyaliwajjala Road, Naalya, Kira Municipality, Wakiso District.

== Ownership ==
Quality Supermarkets is a wholly Ugandan, privately held company. As of August 2014, the detailed shareholding in the company stock in not widely, publicly known.

== See also ==
- Kampala
- Carrefour
- Capital Shoppers
- Uganda Economy
- Uganda Supermarkets
