= James Scott Brown =

James Scott Brown was the Vice-Chancellor of the International Health Sciences University, now the Clarke International University in Kampala.
