= Kampala Marriott Hotel =

Hotel in Kampala, Uganda

- Map showing the location of Kampala Marriott Hotel.

General information
- Location: 2646 Ggaba Road, Nsambya Hill, Kampala, Uganda
- Coordinates: 00°18′15″N 32°35′13″E
- Opening: 27 August 2026

Design and construction
- Developer: Ngabirano Group

Other information
- Number of rooms: 277
- Number of restaurants: 6

The Kampala Marriott Hotel is a hotel in Kampala, the capital and largest city of Uganda. It comprises 181 hotel rooms and suites together with 96 serviced apartments, 6 restaurants, a heated outdor swimming pool, a spa and a fitness center among other amenities. The twin-tower building was inaugurated on 27 August 2026 by Yoweri Museveni, the president of Uganda.

== Location ==
The hotel is located at 2646 Ggaba Road, on Nsambya Hill in the Makindye Division of Kampala. The geographical coordinates of the hotel are 0°18'15.0"N, 32°35'13.0"E (Latitude: Longitude:0.304167; Longitude:32.586944).

== Overview ==
Ponsiano Ngabirano, a Ugandan entrepreneur, businessman and commercial real-estate developer, began developing the building in the early 2020s. He collaborated with the Marriott Hotels Group to operate the hotel under one of the Marriott brands.

The land on which the hotel stands was made available by Cardinal Emmanuel Wamala, the Archbishop Emeritus of the Archdiocese of Kampala. The main Engineering, procurement, and construction (EPC) contractor was SMS Construction Limited, a Ugandan construction company established in 2011.

Among the amenities offered in the development are 181 Marriott Hotels branded rooms together with 96 adjacent Marriott Executive Apartments, each with 1-3 bedrooms. Other provisions include six meeting rooms with a total of 1,293 square metres (13,918 sq ft) of meeting space. The Kampala Grand Ballroom measures 766 square metres (8,245 sq ft) and has a capacity of 985 people in theatre configuration or 700 people at a reception or 528 people at a banquet.

== Ownership ==
Based on available referenced data, the tentative ownership of the hotel is as summarized in the table below:

Kampala Marriott Hotel Tentative Ownership
| Rank | Shareholder | Percentage | Notes |
|---|---|---|---|
| 1 | Ngabirano Group | | |
| 2 | National Social Security Fund (Uganda) | 30.0 | |
| 3 | Other Investors | | |
| | Total | 100.00 | |

== Other considerations ==
As of August 2026, the owner gave the staff count as "about 400", with expectatiions for that figure to rise to 1,000 during the first year of operation.

== See also ==
- Kampala Capital City Authority
- List of tallest buildings in Kampala
