= Paragon Hospital =

Private hospital in Uganda

- Paragon Hospital Limited
- Location within Kampala

Geography
- Location: Bugolobi, Nakawa Division, Kampala, Central Region, Uganda
- Coordinates: 00°18′30″N 32°37′37″E

Organisation
- Care system: Private, For Profit Hospital
- Type: General

Services
- Emergency department: III
- Beds: 400

History
- Founded: 2007; 19 years ago

Links
- Website: Homepage
- Other links: Hospitals in Uganda

Paragon Hospital is a private, upscale, for-profit hospital in Kampala, Uganda's capital and largest city. It is one of the five upscale private tertiary care hospitals in the city.

== Location ==
The hospital sits on a 6 acres (2.4 ha) site, in the neighborhood of Bugolobi, approximately 8.5 kilometres (5.3 mi), by road, southeast of Mulago National Referral Hospital. The geographical coordinates of Paragon Hospital are: 0°18'31.0"N, 32°37'37.0"E (Latitude:0.308611; Longitude:32.626944).

== Overview ==
Paragon Hospital, is an urban, private, for-profit, upscale hospital that serves the population of Kampala and surrounding districts. It is one of the five private upscale hospitals in Uganda's capital city, Kampala. It aims to address the gap in specialized tertiary healthcare delivery in the country and to serve that segment of Uganda's population that has been seeking the missing services from outside Uganda. Paragon Hospital focuses on the provision of prenatal, intrapartum, post partum and fertility services.

== History ==
Construction of the 400 bed facility began in 2004, with the first patients admitted in 2007. The construction budget was estimated at USh9 billion (approx. US$4 million in 2007 money). The hospital plans included a private 150,000 litres (150 m^{3}) reservoir, a private underground water source, and an oxygen manufacturing facility.

== See also ==
- International Hospital Kampala
- Nakasero Hospital
- Kampala Hospital
- Hospitals in Uganda
