= Uganda National Mosque =

Mosque located in Kampala Hill, Uganda

- مسجد أوغندة الوطني
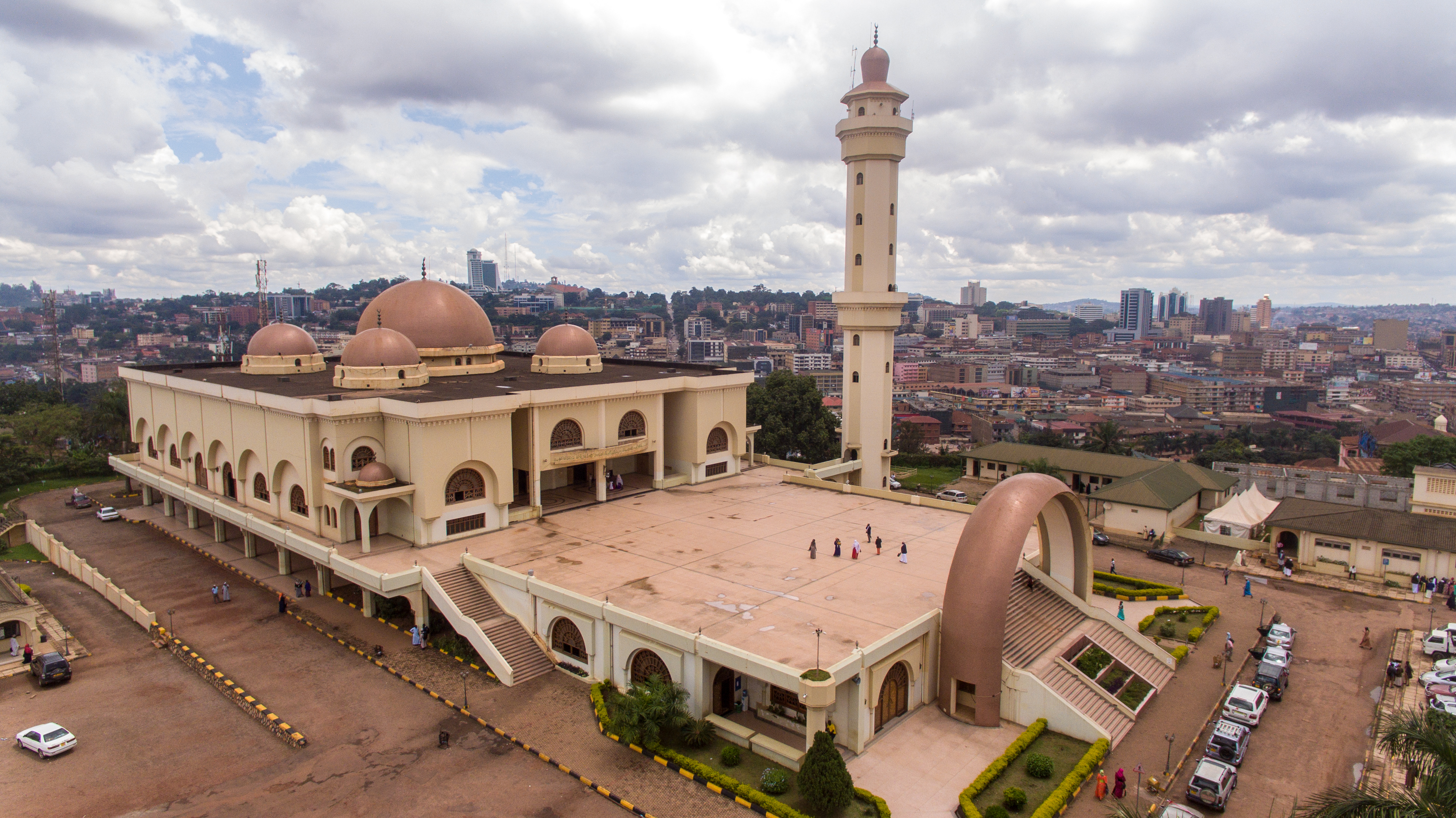
- Aerial view of the mosque

- Location in Kampala

Religion
- Affiliation: Sunni Islam
- Ecclesiastical or organisational status: Mosque
- Status: Active

Location
- Location: Kampala Hill, Kampala
- Country: Uganda
- Interactive map of Uganda National Mosque
- Administration: Uganda Muslim Supreme Council
- Coordinates: 0°18′56″N 32°34′07″E

Architecture
- Type: Mosque
- Completed: 2006

Specifications
- Capacity: c. 20,000 worshipers
- Dome: 5
- Minaret: 1
- Minaret height: 50.5 m (166 ft)
- Site area: 4.9 ha (12 acres)
- Materials: Reinforced concrete

The Uganda National Mosque (Arabic: مسجد أوغندة الوطني), previously known as the Gaddafi National Mosque, is a mosque located at Kampala Hill in the Old Kampala area of Kampala, Uganda. It is the largest mosque in East Africa in a country where, as of 2014, 13.7% of the population was Muslim.

Completed in 2006, it accommodates up to 15,000 worshipers and can hold another 1,100 in the gallery, while the sahn caters for another 3,500 worshipers. Former Libyan leader Muammar Gaddafi commissioned the mosque as a gift to Uganda, and for the benefit of the Muslim population. The mosque's 50.5-metre (166 ft) minaret defines the city's skyline.

== History ==
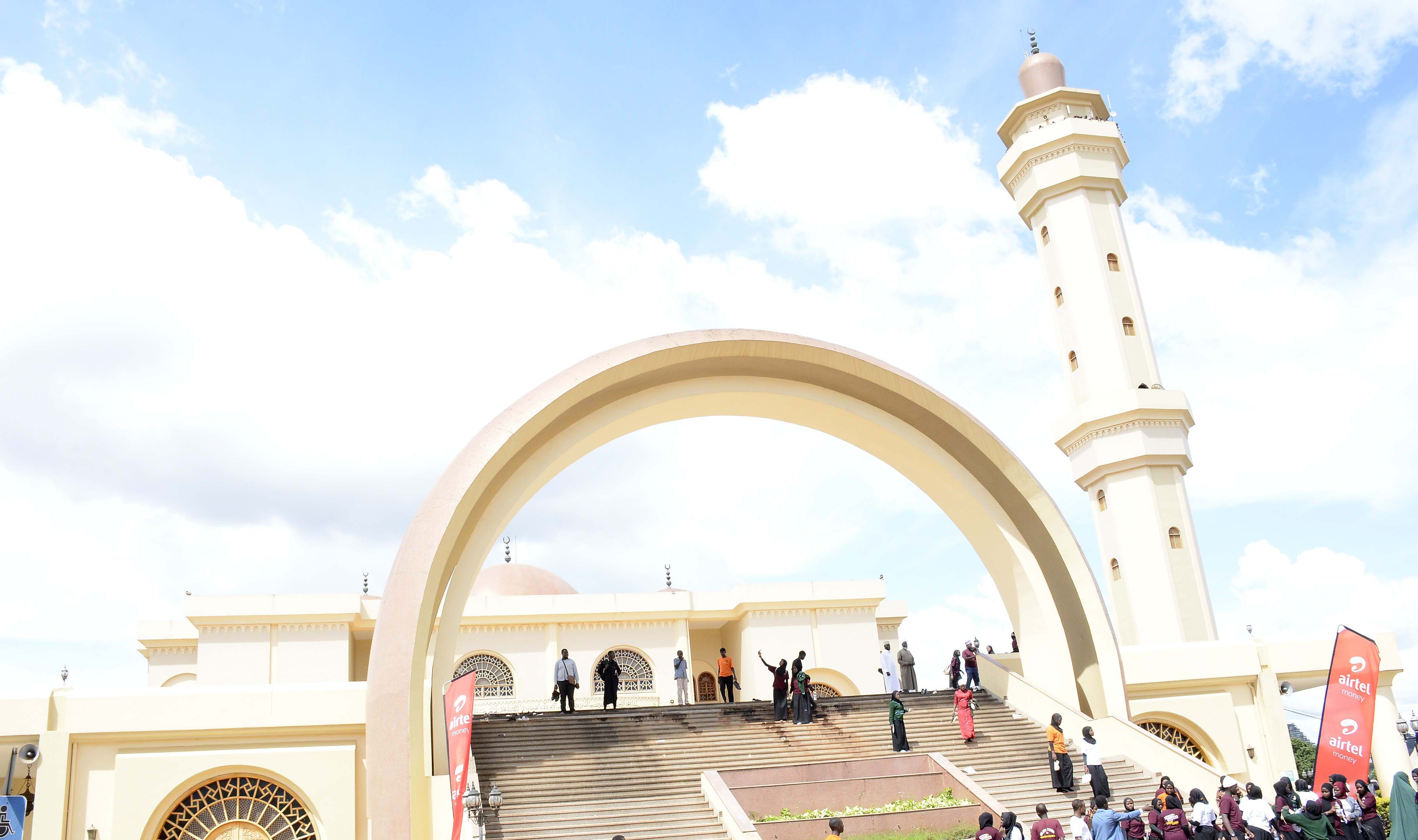
The mosque with iwan and minaret

The construction of the mosque was begun in 1972 by Idi Amin. It was initially called the Old Kampala National Mosque. Construction halted in 1976 during a period of heightened political instability, and in 1979, after Amin was deposed, it seemed like the mosque might not be completed. However, in 2001, Gaddafi expressed willingness to help complete it as a gift to Islamic faith in Uganda.

The completed mosque was opened officially in June 2007 under the name Gaddafi National Mosque, and housed the head offices of the Uganda Muslim Supreme Council. It was renamed "Uganda National Mosque" in 2013 following the death of Colonel Gaddafi as the new Libyan administration was "reluctant to rehabilitate the mosque under the old name."

The mosque's 50.5-metre (166 ft) minaret contains 272 stairs to reach the top.

== Gallery ==
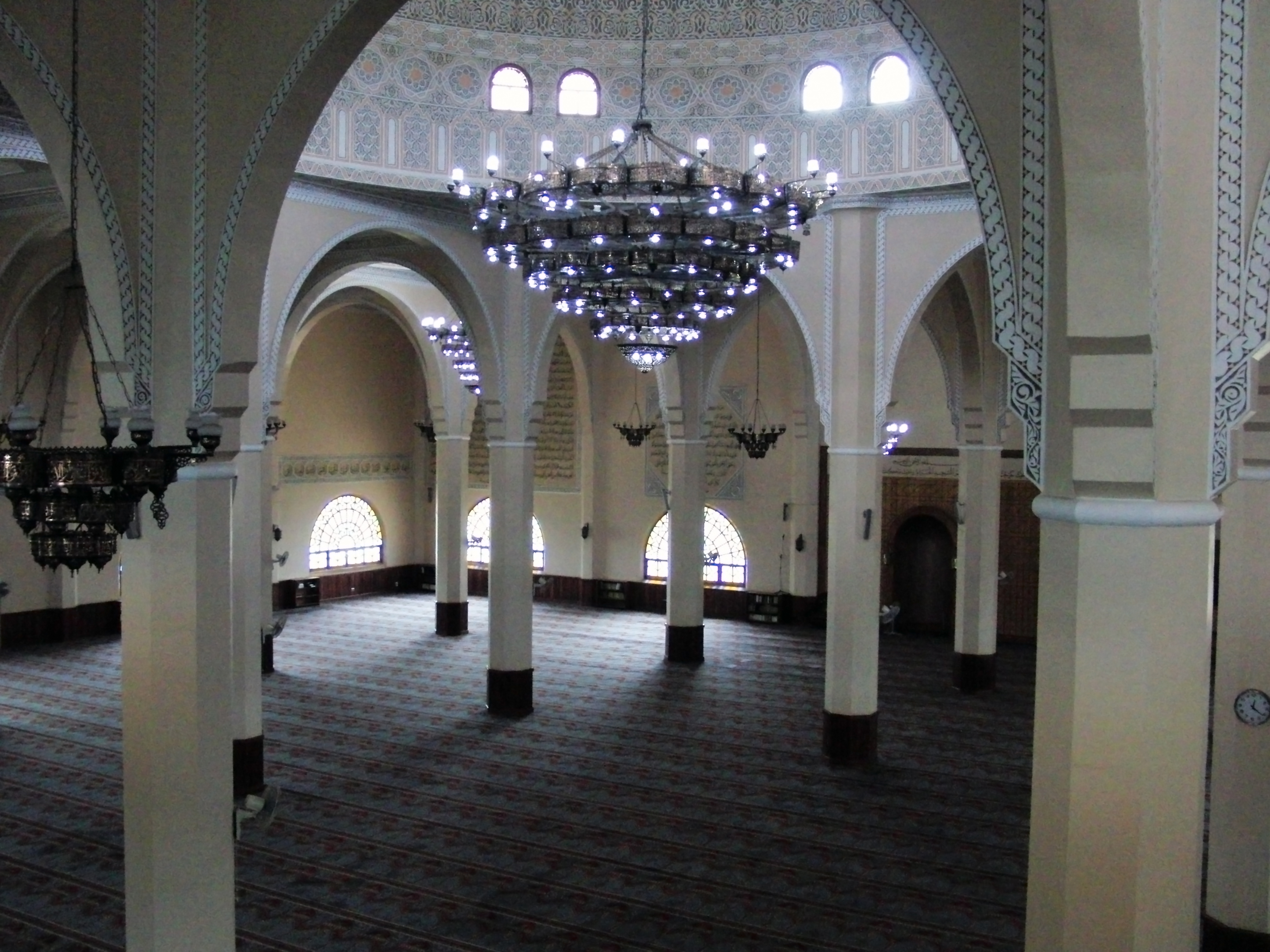
Interior view

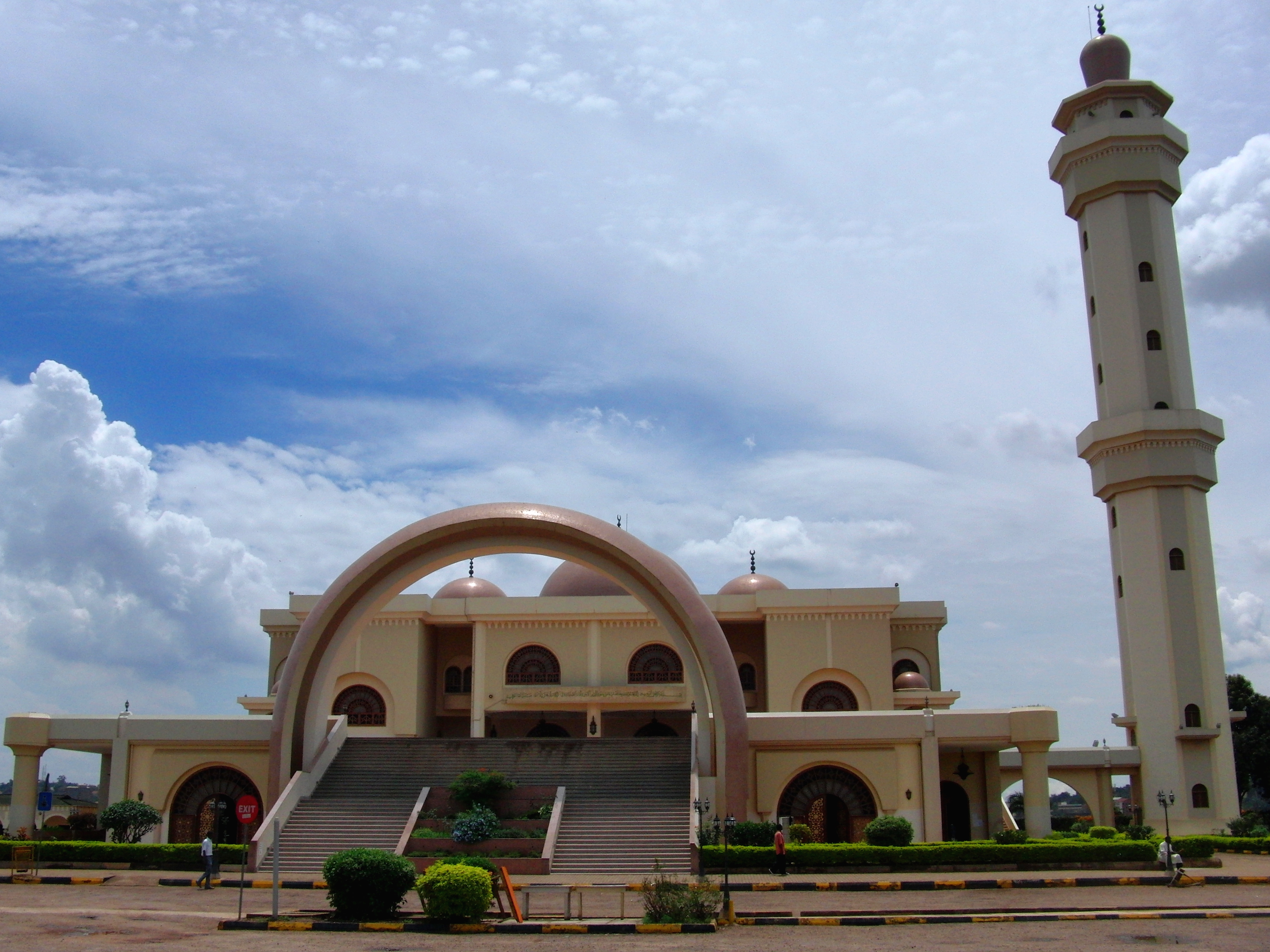
View from the front

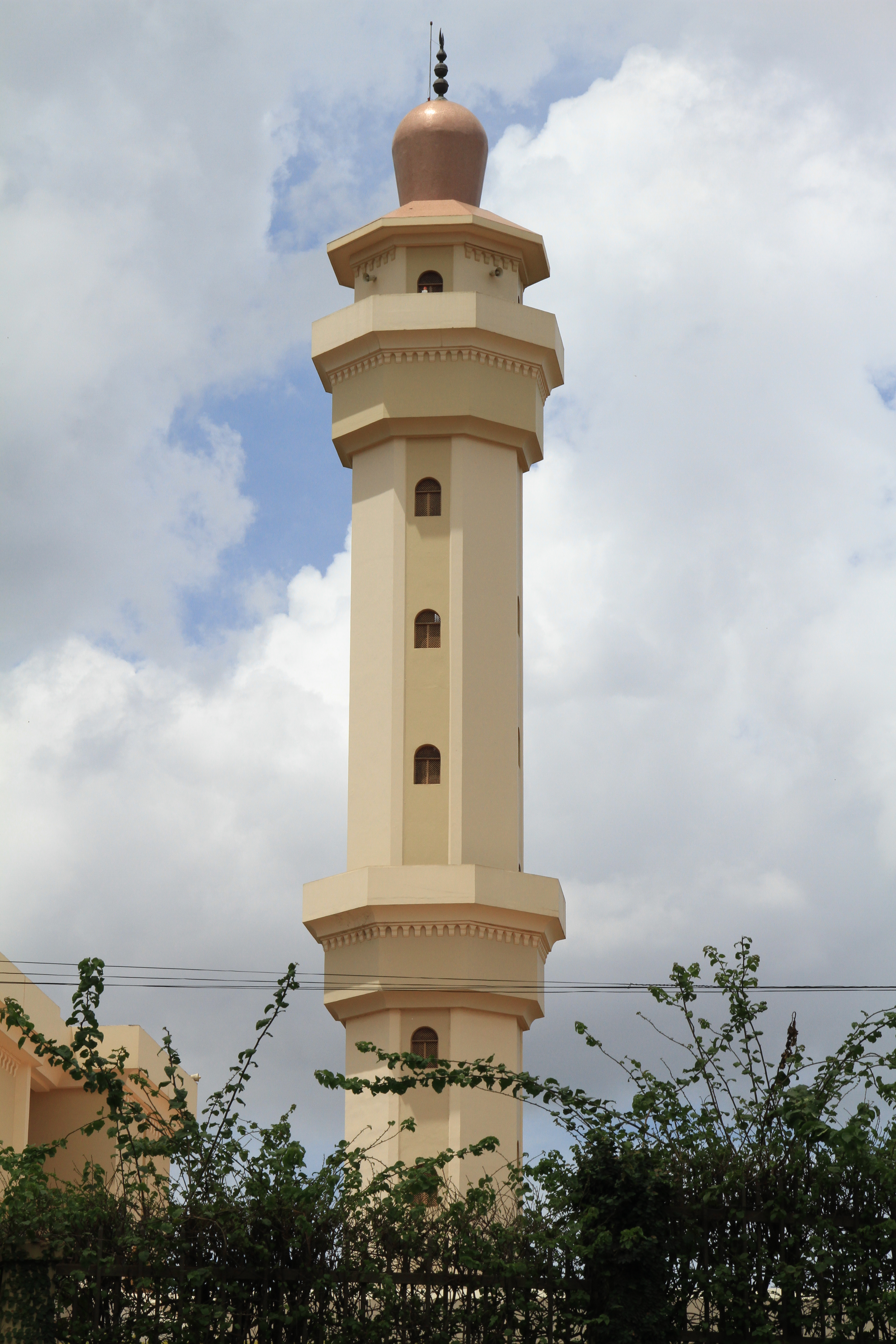
Minaret

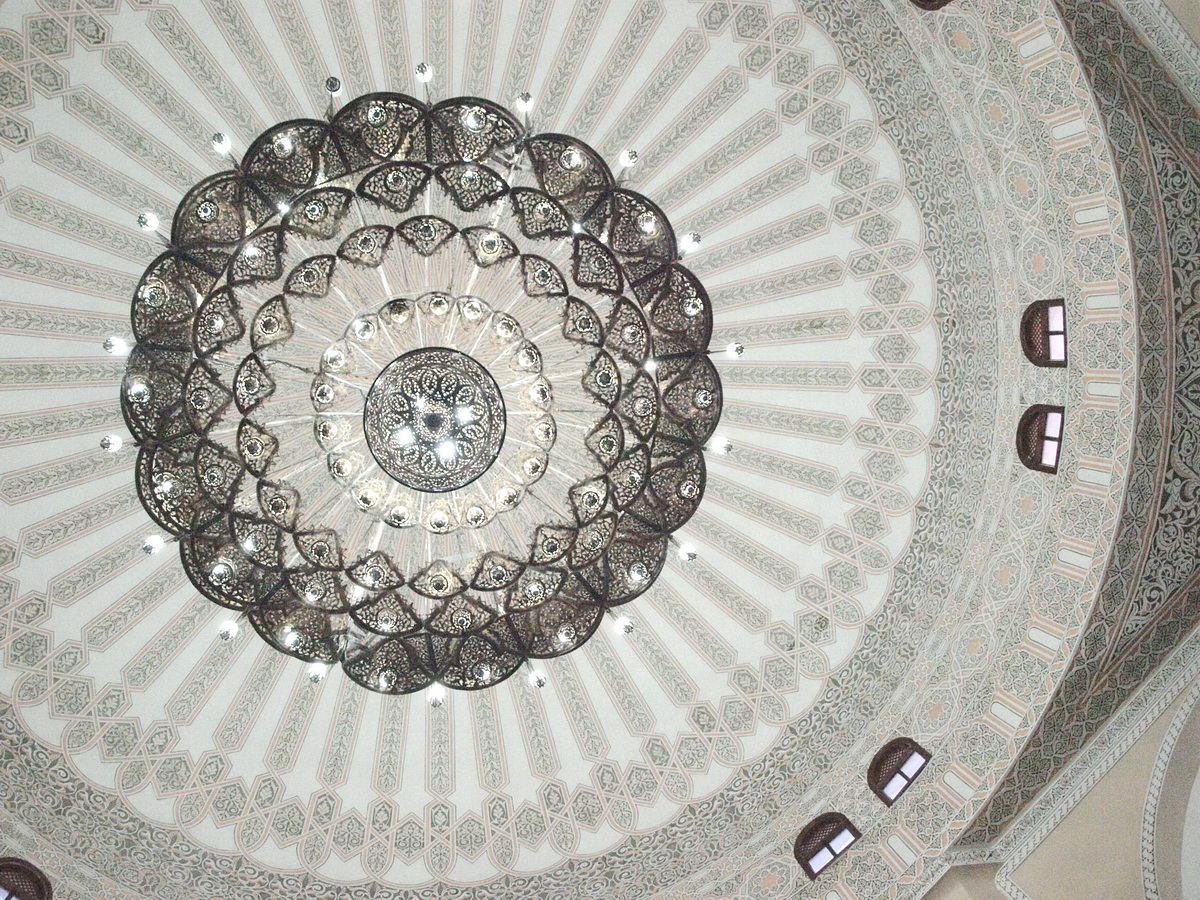
Dome

== See also ==
- Islam in Uganda
- List of mosques in Africa
