= Namuwongo =

- Map of Kampala showing the location of Namuwongo.
- Coordinates: 00°18′29″N 32°36′44″E
- Country: Uganda
- Region: Central Uganda
- District: Kampala Capital City Authority
- Division: Makindye Division
- Elevation: 1,180 m (3,870 ft)
- Time zone: UTC+3 (EAT)

Namuwongo is a location in Kampala, the capital of Uganda and the largest city in that country.

== Location ==
Namuwongo is located in Makindye Division, one of the five administrative divisions of Kampala. It is bordered by Lugogo to the north, Nakawa to the northeast, Kiswa and Bugoloobi to the east, Muyenga to the southeast, Kisugu and Kabalagala to the south, Kibuli to the west and Kololo to the northwest. The neighborhood is located approximately 6 kilometres (3.7 mi), by road, southeast of the central business district of the city. The coordinates of Namuwongo are:0°18'29.0"N 32°36'44.0"E (Latitude:0.308050; Longitude:32.612223).

== Overview ==
Namuwongo is a Kampala neighborhood that was predominantly low income in the 1960s through the 1980s. However, as the population of Kampala has exploded in the 1990s and early 2000s, high-end businesses have moved into the area and raised its profile. Namuwongo's proximity to high-end Kololo and Muyenga, as well as middle-class Nakawa and Bugoloobi, has ensured that it will not be mired into the low-end of the neighborhood spectrum. Low land values arguably played a role in attracting big business to the neighborhood, at least in the beginning.

North of the railway line in Namuwongo sits a place known as "Soweto"; a slum that is divided into seven zones namely: 1. Industrial Area View 2. Go-Down 3. Kasanvu 4. Namuwongo B 5. Namuwongo A 6. Kanyogoga/Masengere 7. Yoweri Kaguta (YOKA). These zones have over 20,000 people that are living in very confined spaces, averaging 2 rooms for a family of at least 4 members.

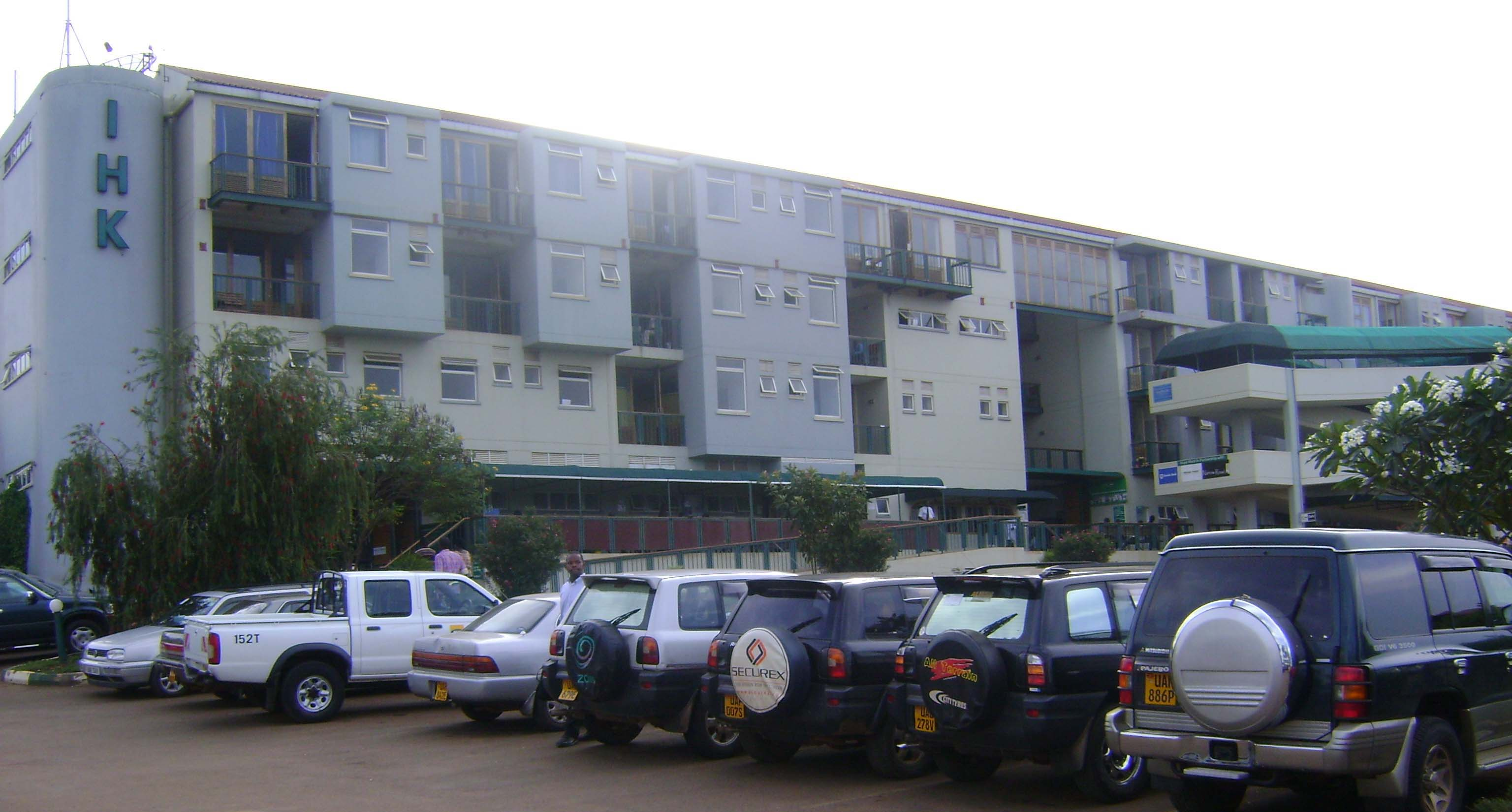
IHK Namuwongo.jpg

== Points of interest ==
Points of interest in Namuwongo include the following:

- A sewerage treatment plant of the National Water and Sewerage Corporation
- International Health Sciences University (IHSU) - one of the 30 universities in Uganda - A member of the International Medical Group
- International Hospital Kampala - A 200-bed state-of-the-art tertiary care hospital - A member of the International Medical Group
- The headquarters of Marie Stopes Uganda (MSU) - An NGO focusing on family planning and reproductive health for both men and women of reproductive age.
- The main office and printing presses of the Monitor Publications, publishers of the Daily Monitor
- Uganda Hands for Hope CBO - Along Namuwongo Road
- KCCA Namuwongo Health Clinic.

== See also ==
- Kampala District
- KCCA
- Lake Victoria
- IHK
- IHSU
- IMG
- Makindye Division
- NWSC
- Mayor Ian Clarke

In Need Home - an NGO providing for OVCs in Namuwongo
