= Clarke International University =

Private university in Uganda

- Motto: Lead, Innovate, Transform
- Type: Private
- Established: January 1, 2008; 18 years ago
- Chancellor: Professor Moses Galukande
- Vice-Chancellor: Rose Clarke Nanyonga
- Students: 900+ (2014)
- Location: Kampala, Uganda; 00°18′19″N 32°36′38″E
- Campus: Urban
- Website: Homepage
- Location in Kampala

Clarke International University, formerly International Health Sciences University (IHSU), is a private non-residential university in Uganda.

== Location ==
Clarke has built its main campus at Kawagga Close, off Kalungi Road, Muyenga at Block 224 | Plot 8244 Bukasa, Kyadondo, from St. Barnabas Road, Namuwongo a southeastern section of Kampala, Uganda's capital and largest city. The coordinates of the university campus are:0°17'32.0"N 32°37'30.0"E (Latitude:0.292222; Longitude:32.625000. The university has an annex on campus, that is located at St. Agnes Academy, Muwayire Road, Kisugu, Kampala, Uganda, at geographical coordinates: 0°18'21.5"N 32°36'29.5"E (Latitude:0.305972; Longitude:32.608194.

== Overview ==
Clarke International University is a member of the Clarke Group of Companies (Clarke Group), a conglomerate of companies in agribusiness, healthcare, education, hospitality, leisure and philanthropy. The companies in the group are majority owned by physician, politician, entrepreneur and philanthropist Dr Ian Clarke.

The university incorporated the Uganda Health Management Institute (UHMI), and the International Hospital School of Nursing (IHSON) as the two founding faculties of the university.

In December 2010, the university marked its maiden graduation ceremony, held at the university campus at Namuwongo, a suburb of Kampala. In March 2014, the university held its fourth graduation ceremony, where 229 students graduated, of whom 111 (48%) were male and 118 (52%) were female.

== History ==
The university admitted the first class of students in August 2008. The chancellor of the university is Dr Moses Galukande. The vice chancellor is Dr. Nanyonga Rose Clarke. The chairman of the University Council is Bishop Zac Niringiye. Dr. Ian Clarke, the founder of the university, was a member of the University Council until he relinquished that responsibility in 2010. The current members of the council are listed at the university's webpage.

== Schools and institutes ==
As of March 2018, the university had one institute and three functional schools:

- Institute of Health Policy and Management
- School of Nursing
- School of Allied Health Sciences
- School of Business and Applied Technology.

== Courses ==
Courses can be pursued full-time, part-time, on-campus, or via remote e-learning. The following academic courses are offered at the university:

=== Postgraduate degree courses ===
- MSc Health Services Management
- MSc Public Health
- Master of Public Health

=== Undergraduate degree courses ===
- BBA Health Management
- BSc Public Health
- Bachelor of Nursing Science (BNSc)
- Bachelors in Medical Laboratory Science (BMLS)

=== Diploma courses ===
- Diploma Public Health
- Diploma Clinical Medicine & Community Health

=== Certificate courses ===
- Ethics and Integrity in Healthcare
- Health Law and Regulations
- Health Communication: Theory and Practice
- Population, Poverty, and Health
- Health and Development
- Gender, Health, and Development
- Healthcare Management and Administration
- Refugee Health Management
- Strategic Planning and Management for Healthcare Organizations
- Quality Management in a Healthcare Setting
- Human Resource Management for Health
- Health Economics for Developing Countries
- Health Policy Analysis
- Healthcare Accounting

== See also ==
- International Medical Group
- International Hospital Kampala
- Education in Uganda
- List of universities in Uganda
- List of medical schools in Uganda
- List of university leaders in Uganda
