= Ponsiano Ngabirano =

Ugandan businessman and entrepreneur

- Born: 1968 (age 57–58); Uganda
- Citizenship: Uganda
- Occupation: Businessman
- Years active: 1997–present
- Title: Chairman & CEO of Capital Shoppers Supermarkets
- Spouse: Eva Ngabirano

Ponsiano Ngabirano is a Ugandan businessman and entrepreneur. He is the founder, chairman and managing director of Capital Shoppers Supermarkets, a chain of supermarket stores, which he owns. Its stores are based in Kampala, Uganda. In 2012, the New Vision newspaper listed him among the wealthiest individuals in Uganda.

== Early life and career ==
Ngabirano was born in Rukungiri District, in the Western Region of Uganda, circa 1968. In 1997, he and his family established the supermarket chain, which owns and operates four supermarket stores in Kampala, Uganda's capital city. Capital Shoppers Supermarkets is the largest locally owned supermarket chain in the country. The family-owned chain maintains a customer-loyalty program that offers 4 percent rebate on purchases, the highest in the industry in Uganda, as of 2014. In January 2012, Ugandan media reports indicated that the supermarket chain was owned at least in part by Ngabirano.

== Businesses and investments ==
As of August 2026, Ponsiano Ngabirano, together with members of his family maintained full or partial ownership interests in the following enterprises, which we will refer to as the Ngabirano Group.

- Capital Shoppers
  - Central Kampala: Dastur Street, Nakasero Hill, Kampala
  - Nakawa Branch: Port Bell Road, Nakawa, Kampala
  - Ntinda Branch: Capital Shoppers Mall, Ntinda Road, Ntinda, Kampala
  - Garden City Branch: Garden City Mall, Kampala
- Kampala Marriott Hotel
- Large parcels of land in and outside of Kampala.
- SMS Contruction Company
- Capital Shoppers Complex, Ntinda

== Net worth ==
According to the New Vision newspaper, in 2012, Ngabirano's net worth was estimated at US$50 million. As of August 2026, his net worth was estimated in excess of US$100 million.
