= Richard Kanyerezi =

Ugandan physician, academic and entrepreneur (1934 – 2019)

- Born: 13 September 1934; Mityana, Uganda
- Died: 30 December 2019 (aged 85); Lubaga, Kampala, Uganda
- Citizenship: Uganda
- Education: Makerere University (Bachelor of Medicine and Bachelor of Surgery) (Doctor of Medicine); Royal College of Physicians (Fellow of the Royal College of Physicians)
- Occupations: Physician, Academic
- Years active: 1962 – 2019
- Known for: Medicine
- Title: Chairman; Kampala Hospital Limited

Richard Bwogi Masembe Kanyerezi (13 September 1934 – 30 December 2019), was a Ugandan physician and academic. At the time of his death, he was the Chairman of the Board of Kampala Hospital, a private hospital that he co-founded and co-owned in Kampala, Uganda's capital city. He served in the past as Professor of Medicine and Head of the Department of Internal Medicine at Makerere University School of Medicine. He was a consultant physician, specializing in the field of Rheumatology.

== Background and education ==
He was born in Buganda, on 13 September 1934, to Asanansio Masembe and Manjeri Masembe. He attended Mityana Primary School, before transferring to Mityana Secondary School for his O-Level studies, graduating in 1952. In 1953, he joined Kings College Budo for his A-Level education, graduating in 1954. In 1955, he entered Makerere University to study human medicine, graduating in 1963, with a Bachelor of Medicine and Bachelor of Surgery degree. He later studied for and was awarded the postgraduate degree of Doctor of Medicine. He studied in the United Kingdom and was awarded the degree of Member of the Royal College of Physicians, specializing in Rheumatology. Later, he was elected Fellow of the Royal College of Physicians. He also studied at Harvard University, as a Fulbright Scholar.

== Career ==
Following his return from further studies in the United Kingdom in 1967, Richard Kanyerezi was appointed Lecturer in the Department of Internal Medicine at Makerere University. He is credited with being a member of the team that started the Master of Medicine program at the Makerere University. He later was appointed Senior Lecturer and in 1976, Professor of Medicine. For a period of time starting circa 1980 until 1981, he served as the Head of the Department of Internal Medicine at the Makerere University. He went into a period of forced exile from 1981 until 1986. Following his return, he and others built Kampala Hospital, a state-of-the art health facility on Kololo Hill in central Kampala.

== Family ==
Kanyerezi is the younger brother to educator and activist Joyce Mpanga Masembe

Richard Kanyerezi was married to the late Gibwa Kanyerezi and together are the parents of four children, one of whom, Nandawula Kanyerezi Mutema is a successful Internal Medicine specialist, practicing in Kampala, Uganda. His son, Timothy Masembe Kanyerezi, is a highly acclaimed corporate lawyer.

Richard married Connie Mbabazi Kanyerezi in 2012 after Gibwa's death in 2010.

== Illness and death ==
Two and one half weeks before his death, Kanyerezi had a cerebral vascular accident. He died at his home in Lubaga (Rubaga), a suburb of Kampala, Uganda's capital city, on 30 December 2019. He was survived by his second wife Connie Mbabazi Kanyerezi and four adult children. Two daughters, Nakimera Kanyerezi Lubega and Nandawula Kanyerezi Mutema are in successful private medical practice. One son, Timothy Masembe, is a law partner at MMAKS Advocates, a Kampala-based law firm. The second son and fourth offspring, Kawalya Kanyerezi, is a corporate executive at Kampala Hospital.

== See also ==
- Mulago Hospital
- MUCHS
- Uganda Ministry of Health
- List of hospitals in Uganda
