= International Medical Group (Uganda) =

Ugandan health conglomerate

- Type: Private
- Industry: Healthcare
- Founded: 1996
- Headquarters: Kampala, Uganda
- Key people: Ian Clarke, founder and chairman
- Services: Universities, medical schools, hospitals, air ambulances, medical insurance
- Number of employees: 500+ (2010)
- Website: img.co.ug

International Medical Group (IMG) is a conglomerate of health-related businesses, headquartered in Kampala, Uganda.

== History ==
IMG was founded by Ian Clarke, a physician and businessman born and educated in Northern Ireland but residing in Uganda since 1988. The first company in the group, International Hospital Kampala was established in 1996.

== Subsidiaries ==
The member companies of IMG include:

- International Hospital Kampala (IHK)
- International Health Sciences University (IHSU)
- IAA Healthcare – medical insurance
- International Medical Foundation (IMF) – the group's charitable foundation
- International Medical Centres (IMC) – network of private clinics
- International Diagnostic Centre (IDC) – a referral centre

== Ownership ==
The majority of the stock of IMG is owned by Ian Clarke, the founder of the group. Other minority shareholders include a group based in Mauritius and another minority shareholder group based in the Netherlands.
