= Nakasero Market =

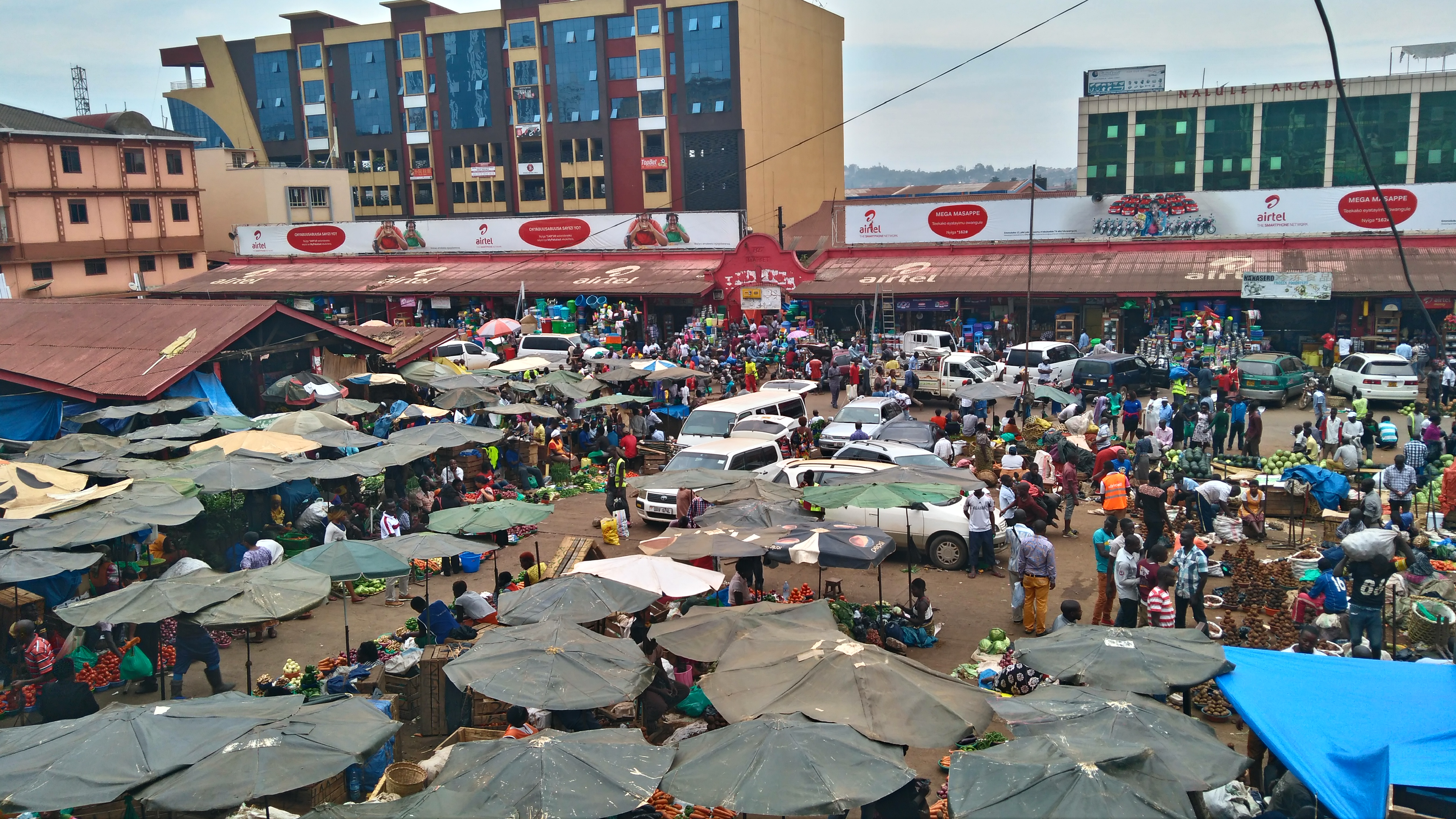
- Nakasero Market

- Map of Kampala showing the location of Nakasero Market.
- Coordinates: 00°18′42.34″N 32°34′46.34″E
- Country: Uganda
- Region: Central Uganda
- District: Kampala Capital City Authority
- Division: Kampala Central Division
- Time zone: UTC+3 (EAT)

Nakasero Market is a market in Kampala, Uganda, located at the foot of Nakasero hill. It sells fresh food, textiles, shoes and cheap electronics. Nakasero market is located 50 meters off the Entebbe Road.It is one of the biggest markets in Kampala city central business District

== History ==
Nakasero Market started in 1895 where it was first established in the Lubiri (Palace). In 1905, Nakasero Market was moved to Kagugube which was initially a temporary structure. In 1927, the market was established in the middle of Kampala, and it is the oldest in the capital. The market employs over 10,000 people from across Uganda and the wider region of East Africa. These include diverse community of vendors, traders, service providers and hawkers acting as a source of income to a rapidly growing urban population most of whom lack access to formal employment.

== Structure ==
Nakasero Market is divided up into two areas; The open area which is partially covered and the closed area which is in an old building. In the open area, fresh produce is mainly sold and in the closed area one would find hardware, clothes and tourist items on sale.

== Ownership ==
Nakasero Market is managed by Nakasero Market Vendors and Traders Association, Ltd.

== Products sold in Nakasero Market ==
- Fruits
- Vegetables
- Meat
- poultry
- Textile
- Electronics
- Matooke
- Eggs
- Coffee
- Spices
