= Diploma in Tropical Medicine and Hygiene =

Postgraduate tropical medicine qualification

The Diploma in Tropical Medicine and Hygiene (DTM&H) is a postgraduate medical award, given after a prescribed period of instruction followed by an examination consisting of three parts; (a) a written examination (b) a practical laboratory examination and (c) an oral examination. In some schools, a fourth part consisting of a clinical bedside examination may be required.

The DTM&H is offered at the London School of Hygiene & Tropical Medicine, at the Liverpool School of Tropical Medicine, the University of Glasgow, the University of Sheffield, Nagasaki University School of Tropical Medicine and Global Health, Bernhard Nocht Institute for Tropical Medicine Hamburg, and at Mahidol University Faculty of Tropical Medicine.

The DTM&H Coursework at Mahidol University, Faculty of Tropical Medicine is a 6-month program in an area endemic with many tropical diseases. The University of Glasgow in conjunction with the Royal College of Physicians offer a part-time course taught both online and in house which leads to DTM&H qualification. Sheffield Teaching Hospitals NHS Trust offer a similar service in conjunction with the University of Sheffield leading to the DTM&H qualification.

== Similar courses ==
A similar course is offered at the University of Pretoria, leading to the award of the Diploma in Tropical Medicine and Health which is also abbreviated DTM&H. There is also an online course offered over 1 year at the University of the Witwatersrand in Johannesburg, where the abbreviation is also styled DTM&H.

The Royal College of Physicians of Ireland and Royal College of Surgeons in Ireland jointly offer a similar course, but the diploma awarded is called the Diploma in Tropical Medicine. That is abbreviated as DTM RCP&SI or DTM RCPSI.

The American Society for Tropical Medicine and Hygiene administers an exam and Certificate in Tropical Medicine (CTropMed) for graduates of DTM&H courses. Several American universities offer an equivalent course, sometimes simplified to the Diploma in Tropical Medicine (DTM), including Johns Hopkins University, National School of Tropical Medicine (Baylor College of Medicine), University of Alabama at Birmingham/Universidad Peruana Cayetano Heredia (Gorgas Course), and the University of Minnesota.

The University of Western Australia offers Graduate Diploma in Infectious Diseases, as well as a more popular Master of Infectious Diseases (Coursework & Dissertation), abbreviated GradDipInfectDis. and MInfectDis., respectively. These courses have components taught by the London School of Hygiene & Tropical Medicine.

== See also ==
- London School of Hygiene & Tropical Medicine
- Liverpool School of Tropical Medicine
- Tropical medicine
