= Ian Clarke (physician) =

Ugandan entrepreneur and politician, from Northern Ireland

- Born: 1952 (age 73–74); South Armagh, Northern Ireland
- Citizenship: Irish and Uganda
- Education: Queen's University Belfast (Bachelor of Obstetrics) (Bachelor of Medicine and Bachelor of Surgery); Liverpool School of Tropical Medicine (Diploma in Tropical Medicine and Hygiene) (Master of Science in Public Health)
- Occupations: Physician; Politician; Businessman; Philanthropist; Entrepreneur
- Years active: 1986 – present
- Known for: Medicine; Business; Politics
- Title: Mayor; Makindye Division
- Spouse: Roberta Clarke
- Children: 3 Irish and 2 adopted Ugandan

Ian Clarke (born 1952) is a physician, missionary, philanthropist, entrepreneur, and politician in Uganda. From 2011 to 2016, he was mayor of Makindye Division, one of the five administrative units of the Kampala Capital City Authority.

== Early life and education ==
Clarke was born in South Armagh, Northern Ireland in 1952 to Thomas and Jean Clarke. He studied human medicine at Queen's University Belfast, graduating in 1976 with a Bachelor of Medicine and Bachelor of Surgery and a Bachelor of Obstetrics, as is customary in Irish medical schools. In 1987, he obtained a Diploma in Tropical Medicine and Hygiene from the Liverpool School of Tropical Medicine (LSTM). He followed up in 1994 with a Master of Science in Public Health, also from LSTM.

== Moving to Uganda ==
Clarke read about the AIDS epidemic in Uganda and decided to come see for himself. He was taken to Kiwoko Village in present-day Nakaseke District in the Luweero Triangle. He arrived in 1987, at the tail end of the Ugandan Bush War, which he had been unaware of until he arrived. He subsequently returned with his family under the auspices of the Church Mission Society to work in Kiwoko. Clarke initially treated his patients under a tree before going on to establish Kiwoko Hospital which, as of March 2015, maintained a nurses training school, a laboratory technician training school, a large community health programme, a neonatal ICU, and full general hospital facilities.

Clarke later moved to Kampala, setting up his first clinic (International Medical Centre) within the Kampala Pentecostal Church Building (Watoto Church) on Buganda Road in Central Kampala. He subsequently opened International Hospital Kampala (IHK) in Old Kampala where Uganda's first open-heart surgery was carried out. IHK subsequently grew and moved to Namuwongo, another Kampala suburb. The 110-bed facility is the only ISO certified hospital in Uganda. The hospital has facilities including specialties such as obstetrics and gynaecology, paediatrics, and plastic surgery.

== Other responsibilities ==
Clarke also writes a weekly column in The New Vision, Uganda's biggest daily, and has penned two books entitled The Man with the Key Has Gone and How Deep Is This Pothole. He has further projects in Juba, South Sudan and in Zanzibar, Tanzania where his family built, owns, and operates a boutique hotel. His wife Roberta Clarke, lives with him in Kampala. Their oldest son Sean oversees the approximately 12 clinics that his father owns in Uganda. Their daughter Lauren is a nurse and lives in Ireland. Their youngest son Michael runs the family hotel in Zanzibar.

== Political career ==
In November 2010, Clarke entered Ugandan politics by securing nomination, as an independent candidate, to contest for the chairmanship of Makindye Division, one of the five divisions of the Kampala Capital City Authority, the governing body of Uganda's capital city of Kampala. He was motivated to run due to the bad roads and poor living conditions within his community. His three pillars in the election were: "good roads, good health and economic development". He enjoyed a landmark victory and was sworn into office as mayor in May 2011 to serve for a five-year term.

== Affiliated businesses ==
Clarke is the Chairman of Clarke Group Companies Clarke Group is the promoter company of Clarke family-related businesses. These include Clarke International University (CIU) [ww.ciu.ac.ug], Clarke Junior School (CJS) , Clarke Farm and Coffee Estate , the Coffee Lodge , Landscape Design, IAA Health Care South Sudan, IMC South Sudan, and Seasons Lodge Zanzibar . In January 2014, unofficial estimates put the value of Clarke's businesses at US$15 million.

== See also ==
- Hospitals in Uganda
- Makindye
