= Kampala Hill =

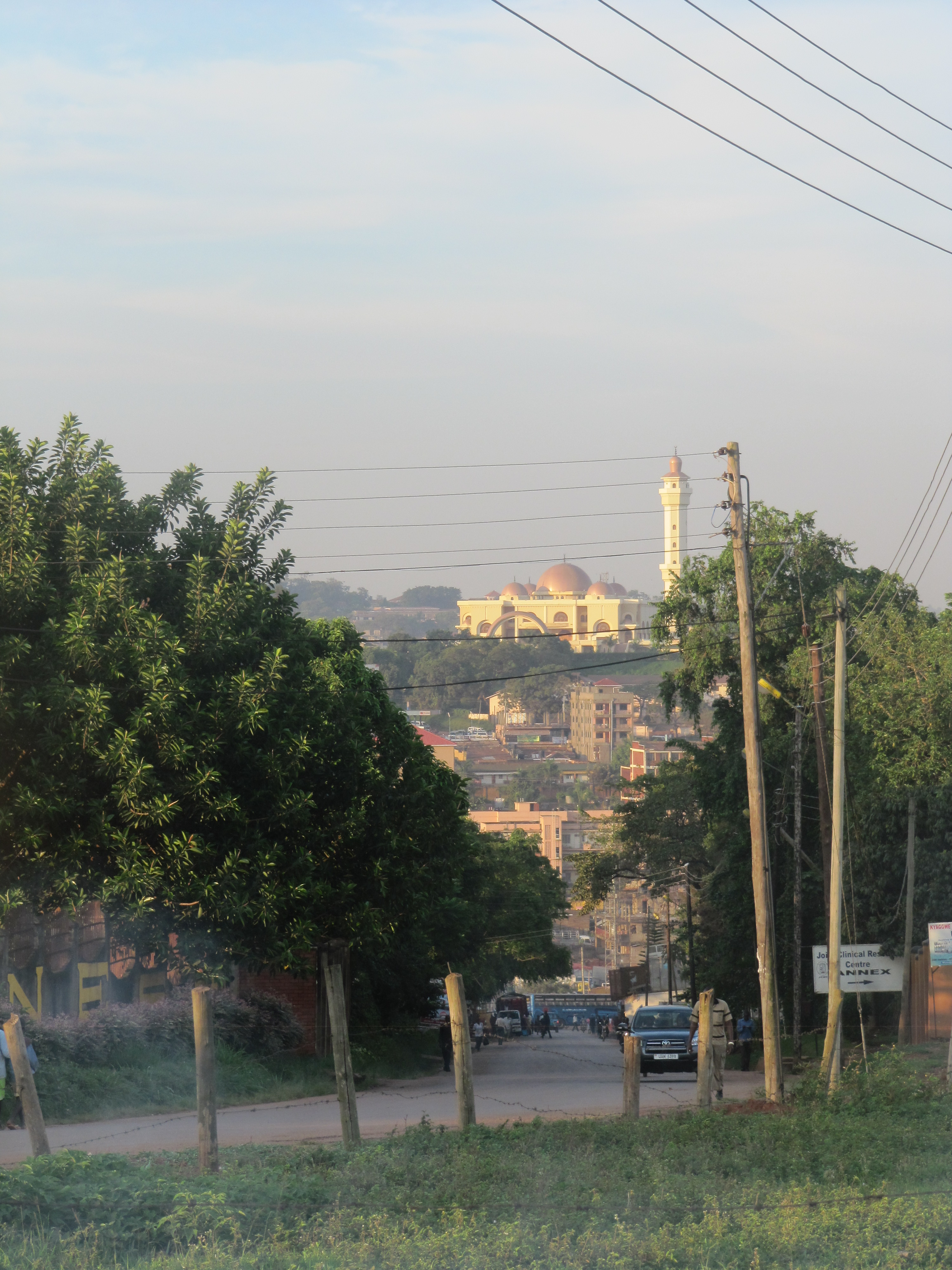
- Gaddafi National Mosque
- Nickname: Old Kampala
- Map of Kampala showing the location of Kampala Hill.
- Coordinates: 00°18′55″N 32°34′07″E
- Country: Uganda
- Region: Central Uganda
- District: Kampala Capital City Authority
- Division: Kampala Central Division
- Elevation: 1,210 m (3,970 ft)
- Time zone: UTC+3 (EAT)

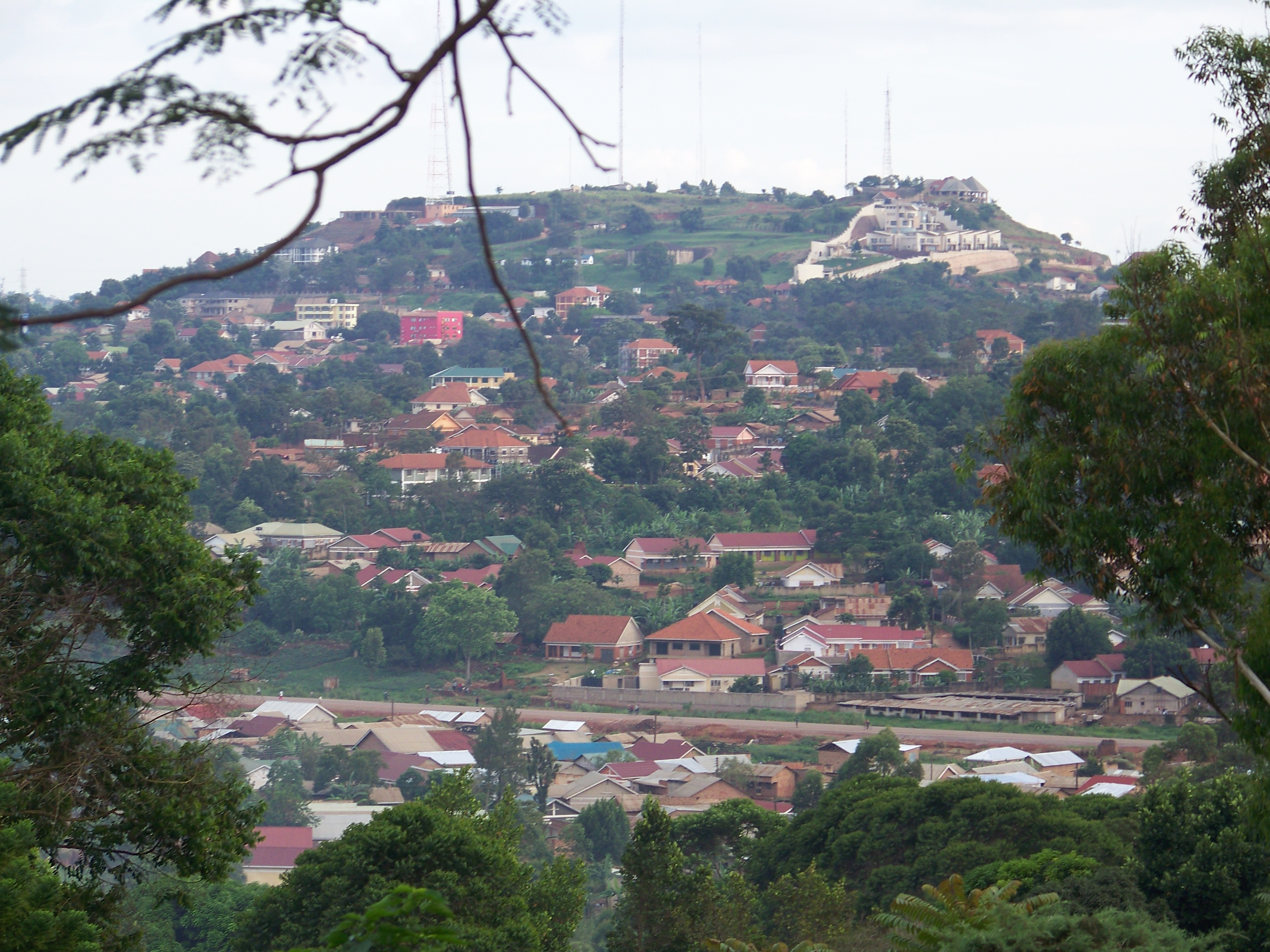
A Kampala hill as seen from Kikaaya

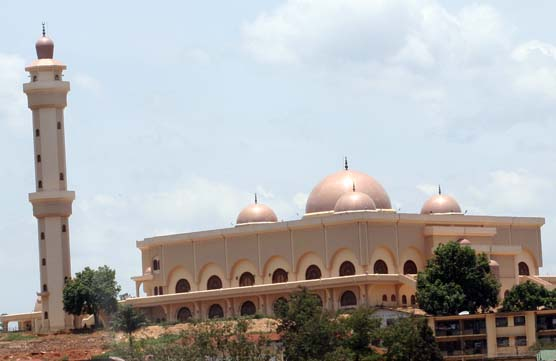
Old Kampala mosque

Kampala Hill, commonly referred to as Old Kampala, is a hill in the centre of Kampala, Uganda's capital and largest city.

== Location ==
Kampala Hill is bordered by Makerere to the north, Nakasero to the east, Mengo to the south and Namirembe to the west. When calculating distances between Kampala and other places, Kampala Hill is often taken as the starting point. The coordinates of the hill are:0°18'55.0"N, 32°34'07.0"E (Latitude: 0.315278; Longitude: 32.568611).

== Overview ==
Kampala Hill was the nucleus of the city of Kampala. When the city expanded to other neighbouring hills, the place began to be referred to as Old Kampala, a name that is still in use today, 120 years later. As of June 2014, the hill is a mixed commercial and residential neighbourhood with high-rise apartment complexes, shops, restaurants, bars, cafes, bed-and-breakfast establishments and several motels. The neighbourhood is a beehive of activity, both during the week and on weekends.

== History ==
Before the arrival of the British, Kampala Hill, along with the neighbouring environs, was a favourite hunting ground of the King of Buganda. The area was particularly rich with game, especially impala, a type of African antelope. The word Impala, most probably comes from the Zulu language. The British referred to the hill as the Hill of the Impala. The Luganda translation comes to Akasozi K'empala. Through repeated usage, the name of the place eventually became Kampala. The name then came to apply to the entire city.

Frederick Lugard, a British mercenary in the pay of the Imperial British East Africa Company, arrived in Uganda in the 1890s. He built a fort on top of the hill. The original fort was relocated in 2003 to a different site on the hill, to accommodate construction of the Gaddafi National Mosque, the largest mosque in Uganda, with a seating capacity of 15,000 people. It was built with monetary assistance from Libya. The completed mosque was opened officially in June 2007.

== Points of interest ==
The following points of interest are located on or near Kampala Hill:

- The site where St. Matiya Mulumba was murdered on 30 May 1886 - One of the Uganda Martyrs
- The Uganda Moslem Supreme Council Mosque, which is also known as the Gaddafi Mosque - the largest mosque in Uganda; seating capacity 15,000.
- Fort Lugard - Built in the 1890s, by Lord Lugard, the first military administrator of the British East Africa Company
- Old Kampala Hospital - A private hospital
- Old Kampala Senior Secondary School - A non-residential public high school
- A branch of Diamond Trust Bank (Uganda) Limited
- A branch of Exim Bank (Uganda)
- Mukwano Shopping Arcade - A middle-class shopping mall
- The headquarters and main store of Quality Supermarkets, a locally owned supermarket chain
- Old Kampala Police Station
- The Headquarters of the Uganda Muslim Supreme Council
- Nakivubo Stadium - Seating capacity 25,000, located in the valley between Old Kampala, Nakasero Hill and Mengo Hill.

== See also ==
- KCCA
- Central Kampala
- Mengo
- Namirembe
- Kampala District
