= International Hospital Kampala =

Private hospital in Kampala

- International Medical Group
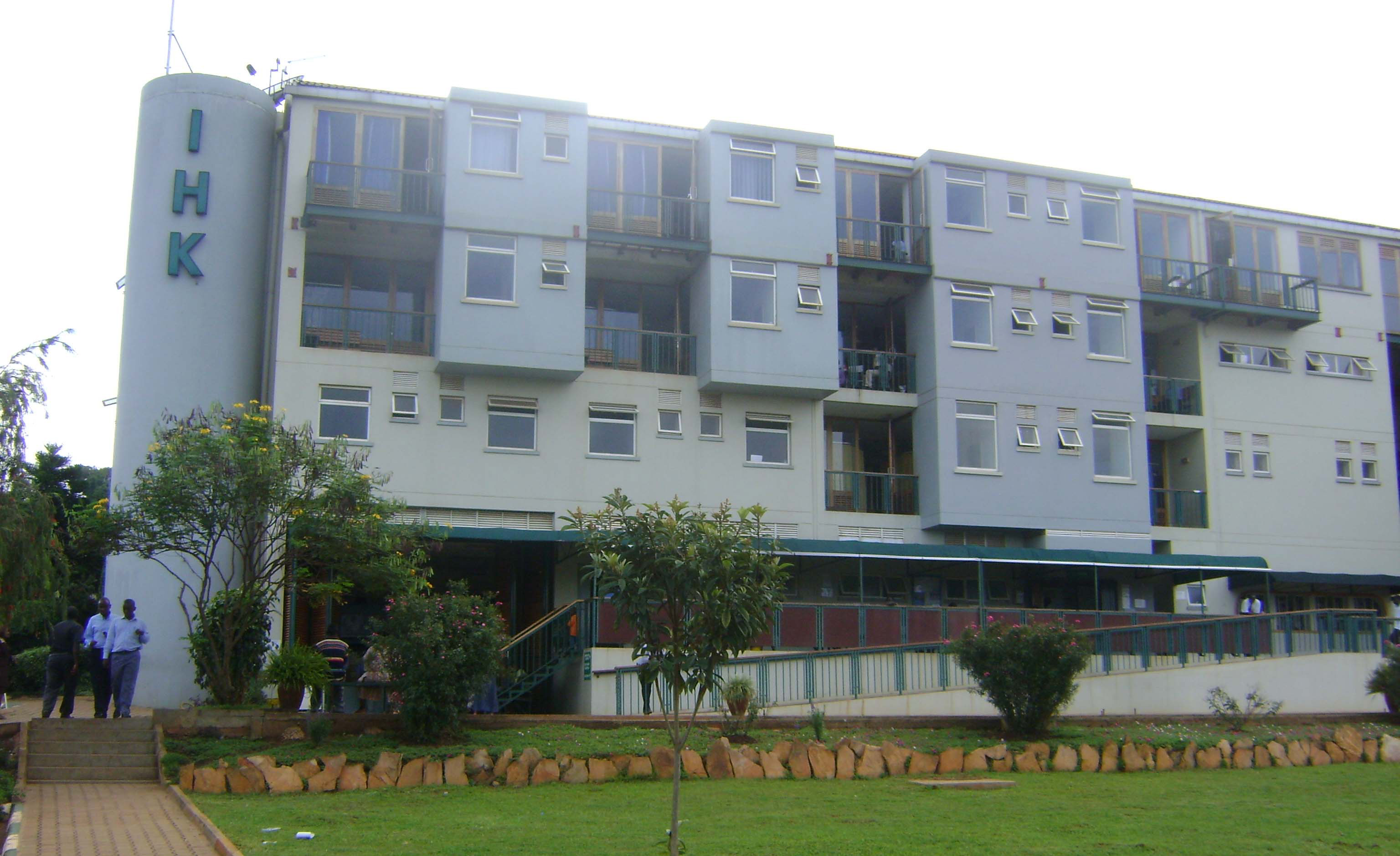
- Healthcare that meets International standards

- Map of Kampala showing the location of Kampala International Hospital.

Geography
- Location: Namuwongo, Kampala, Makindye Division, Central Region
- Coordinates: 00°18′19″N 32°36′40″E

Organisation
- Care system: Private
- Type: General and teaching

Services
- Beds: 100

History
- Founded: 1996

Links
- Website: Homepage
- Other links: List of hospitals in Uganda; Medical education in Uganda

International Hospital Kampala (IHK) is a private hospital in Kampala, Uganda and is part of the International Medical Group, the largest private healthcare group in Uganda.

== Location ==
The hospital is located in Namuwongo, Makindye Division, in southeast Kampala, about 6.5 kilometres (4 mi), by road, southeast of Mulago National Referral Hospital. This is approximately 3.5 kilometres (2 mi), by road, east of St. Francis Hospital Nsambya. The coordinates of International Hospital Kampala are:0°18'19.0"N, 32°36'40.0"E (Latitude:0.305289; Longitude:32.611112).

== History ==
IHK became operational in 2000, and was founded by Dr. Ian Clarke, a general practitioner and tropical medicine specialist, born in Northern Ireland. The hospital initially opened at a smaller premises in Old Kampala, before relocating to its current home in 2004. Since its opening in 2000, IHK has pioneered in a number of areas. The first open heart surgery was done at the hospital. It was also one of the first facilities in Uganda to do laparoscopic (keyhole) surgery.

In 2012, IHK signed a management agreement with Fortis Hospital Group (FHG), based in Delhi, India. The relationship brought a number of benefits to IHK including skill sharing and training. In 2015, majority shares in International Medical Group were sold to CIEL Limited, a leading Mauritius-based investment holding company, through its wholly owned subsidiary CIEL Healthcare Limited (CHL).

In 2020, IHK changed ownership and rebranded as CCARE IHK.

The services offered at IHK include the following:

- Emergency Ambulance
- 24hr Accident and Emergency Department
- Outpatient Care
- IDC Lancet laboratory with 3,000+ tests
- Intensive Care Unit with 10 beds
- Trauma Surgery
- Paediatrics with Children's Centre
- Physiotherapy
- Antenatal Care
- Pharmacy

== Operations ==
As of April 2018, the following specialty services were available at IHK. The list is not exhaustive:

- General Surgery
- Robotic Surgery
- Anaesthesia and Intensive care medicine
- Obstetrics & Gynaecology
- Paediatics
- Neonatalogy
- Orthopaedics
- Neurosurgery
- Oncology
- Urology
- Cardiology
- Nephrology
- Plastic Surgery
- Reconstructive Surgery
- Internal Medicine
- Family Medicine
- Radiology
- Psychiatry
- Dermatology

Rescue services are provided within Uganda by road to a preferred health centre where possible. IHK's ambulances are fully equipped and are staffed with experienced medical staff able to handle minor and major emergencies.

== Corporate and social responsibility ==
Hope Ward, an initiative started in 2006, aims to provide complex treatment for the destitute. It was initially a dedicated medical and surgical ward, and was eventually turned into the paediatrics ward as there was more of a demand for this. Patients are now treated on the relevant wards. Patients have included the following;

- Trauma victims from the war in Northern Uganda who required plastic surgery
- Both adults and children with cancer related complications
- Both adults and children with HIV related complications
- Burns and acid attacks
- Patients with fistula
- Children born with birth defects

Availability of funding determines how many and how often patients are treated. Funding comes from sponsors (individuals and corporations) and fundraising with IHK, discounting costs from 10% to 100%.

Previous sponsors include Babulal Ruparelia, Stanbic Bank Uganda and Bead for Life. The annual Hope Ward run is one of the main events.

Other CSR includes free treatment of HIV and TB patients through the Touch Namuwongo clinic, an International Medical Foundation initiative, community outreaches in partnership with several others and medical sponsorship at CSR events.

== See also ==
- Kampala Capital City Authority
- Hospitals in Uganda
- List of universities in Uganda
- Kiwoko Hospital
- Kampala Hospital
- Nakasero Hospital
- Ian Clarke
- Clarke International University
- List of medical schools in Uganda
