= Nakasero =

Neighborhood in Kampala city, Uganda

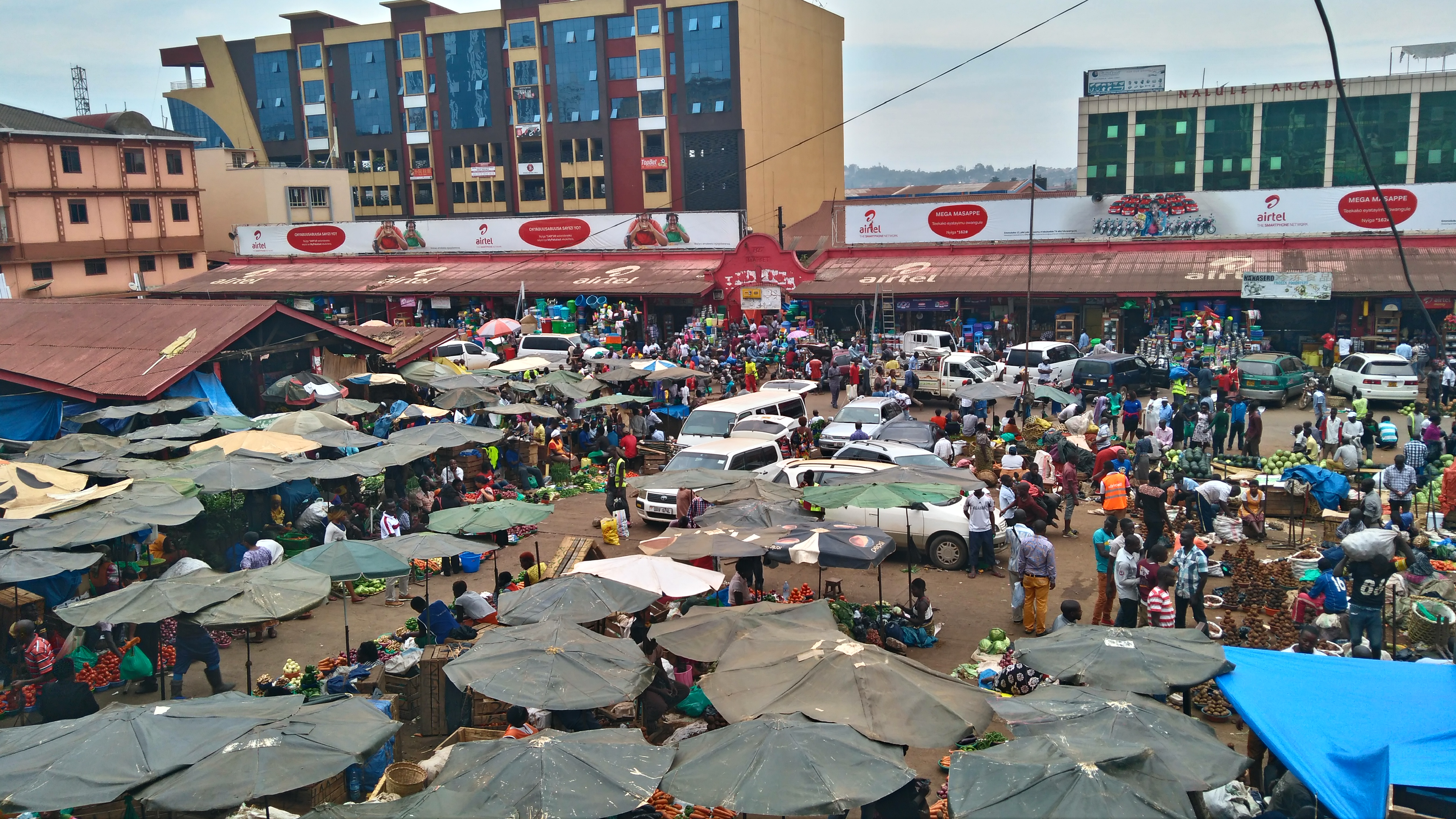
- Nakasero

- Map of Kampala showing the location of Nakasero.
- Coordinates: 00°19′24″N 32°34′44″E
- Country: Uganda
- Region: Central Uganda
- District: Kampala Capital City Authority
- Division: Kampala Central Division
- Elevation: 1,228 m (4,029 ft)
- Time zone: UTC+3 (EAT)

Nakasero is a hill and neighborhood in the centre of Kampala, the capital and largest city of Uganda. Nakasero is important to Uganda's economy and politics, as it is home to Kampala's central business district and several government offices, including the Ugandan Parliament Buildings.

== Location ==
Nakasero is bordered by Mulago to the north, Makerere to the northwest, Old Kampala to the west, Namirembe and Mengo to the southwest, Nsambya to the south, Kibuli to the southeast, and Kololo to the east. The coordinates of Nakasero Hill are 0°19'24.0"N, 32°34'44.0"E (Latitude:0.323334; Longitude:32.578890). Nakasero Hill rises 1,228 metres (4,029 ft) above mean sea level.

== Overview ==
Nakasero Hill is the location of the central business district of Kampala, whose nighttime population was estimated at 1,680,600 as of July 2020.

The lower reaches of the western and southern slopes of the hill accommodate the ordinary business and commercial activities of the city (taxi parks, train station, shopping arcades, banks, and restaurants). Towards the top of the hill, there are government buildings including the Uganda Parliament Buildings, several government ministries and the Kampala Capital City Authority Building Complex.

The top of Nakasero Hill is one of the most luxurious addresses in the city and accommodates the most upscale hotels and restaurants in Kampala and the country. The Kampala State House is also located here. The northern and eastern slopes of Nakasero Hill house many of the diplomatic missions to Uganda and the residences of many ambassadors accredited to Uganda.

== Landmarks ==
The numerous landmarks in Kampala's central business district, located on Nakasero hill, include but are not limited to the following:

=== Government buildings ===
- Uganda Parliament Buildings
- State House, Kampala
- Headquarters of Bank of Uganda
- Headquarters of Uganda Wildlife Authority
- Uganda Bureau of Statistics
- Uganda Commercial Court Building Complex
- Uganda Government Analytical Chemistry Laboratory
- Uganda High Court
- Uganda Investment Authority
- Uganda Ministry of Finance, Planning & Economic Development
- Uganda Ministry of Foreign Affairs
- Uganda Ministry of Health
- Uganda Ministry of Internal Affairs
- Uganda Ministry of Tourism, Trade and Industry

=== Banking institutions ===
Nearly all commercial banks and the three development banks in Uganda maintain their headquarters and main branches in Nakasero.

- Headquarters of ABC Bank (Uganda)
- Headquarters of Absa Bank Uganda
- Headquarters of Afriland First Bank Uganda Limited
- Headquarters of Bank of Africa (Uganda)
- Headquarters of Bank of Baroda (Uganda)
- Headquarters of Bank of India (Uganda)
- Headquarters of Cairo Bank Uganda
- Headquarters of Centenary Bank
- Headquarters of Citibank Uganda
- Headquarters of DFCU Bank
- Headquarters of Diamond Trust Bank (Uganda) Limited
- Headquarters of Ecobank (Uganda)
- Headquarters of Equity Bank (Uganda)
- Headquarters of Guaranty Trust Bank (Uganda)
- Headquarters of Kenya Commercial Bank (Uganda)
- Headquarters of NCBA Bank Uganda
- Headquarters of Orient Bank - A member of the I&M Bank Group
- Headquarters of PostBank Uganda
- Headquarters of Stanbic Bank (Uganda) Limited
- Headquarters of Standard Chartered Uganda
- Headquarters of Tropical Bank
- Headquarters of Uganda Development Bank
- Headquarters of United Bank for Africa (Uganda)
- Headquarters of East African Development Bank
- Headquarters of Uganda Development Bank
- Regional Office (Eastern Africa) of African Export–Import Bank

=== Hotels, clubs, and casinos ===
- Grand Imperial Hotel
- Fairway Hotel & Spa
- Imperial Royale Hotel
- The Pearl of Africa Hotel Kampala
- Kampala Hilton Hotel
- Kampala Intercontinental Hotel
- Kampala Serena Hotel
- Kampala Sheraton Hotel
- Kampala Speke Hotel

== Foreign embassies ==
The following foreign missions maintain their offices on Nakasero Hill.

- Embassy of Belgium
- Embassy of France
- Embassy of India
- Embassy of Ireland
- Embassy of Italy
- Embassy of Kenya
- Embassy of Nigeria
- Embassy of Norway
- Embassy of Somalia
- Embassy of South Korea
- Embassy of Spain
- Embassy of Switzerland
- High Commission of Tanzania
- Embassy of United Arab Emirates

=== Places of worship ===
- All Saints Cathedral - Anglican
- Watoto Church - Evangelical
- Christ the King Catholic Church - Roman Catholic

=== Others ===
- Buganda Road Primary School
- Headquarters of AMREF in Uganda
- Headquarters of UNDP in Uganda
- Kampala Central Police Station
- Kampala Capital City Authority Building Complex
- Kampala Railway Station
- Nakasero Farmers Market
- Uganda Main Post Office
- Uganda National Cultural Center
- Case Medical Centre
- Nakasero Hospital

== See also ==
- Kololo
- Muyenga
- Mengo, Uganda
- Nsambya
