= Kololo =

- Map of Kampala showing the location of Kololo.
- Coordinates: 00°19′46″N 32°35′41″E
- Country: Uganda
- Region: Central Uganda
- District: Kampala
- Division: Kampala Central Division
- Elevation: 1,311 m (4,301 ft)
- Time zone: UTC+3 (EAT)

Kololo is a hill in Kampala, the largest city and capital of Uganda. The name also applies to the upscale residential and commercial neighbourhood that sits on that hill.

== Location ==
Kololo is close to the centre of Kampala, bordered by Naguru to the east, Bukoto to the north, Mulago to the north-west, Makerere to the west, Nakasero to the south-west, and Kibuli to the south. Kololo is in the Kampala Central Division. The coordinates of Kololo are 0°19'46.0"N, 32°35'41.0"E (Latitude:0.329445; Longitude:32.594725). Kololo Hill rises to a maximum height of 4,302 feet (1,311 m) above sea level.

== Overview ==
Kololo gets its name from the 19th century Acholi Chief Awich, from Northern Uganda. He, along with Kabalega of Bunyoro resisted British rule. Awich was arrested and brought to Kampala and incarcerated on top of Kololo Hill. He is alleged to have cried out in Luo, “An atye kany kololo”, which means “I am here alone.” Awich was lamenting over the fact that he had been left alone in the wilderness, miles away from home. His captors and the Baganda started calling the location and the hill "Kololo", resulting in its name today.

Since the 1950s, before Uganda's Independence, Kololo has been an upscale residential area because of its central location in the city and to the views from the hill. Kololo is a popular location for diplomatic missions to Uganda, housing more than a dozen embassies and ambassadors' residences.

During the 2000s, hotels, banks, hospitals, and other corporate entities began to infiltrate the hill, mainly to serve those who reside there, away from the noise and traffic congestion in the central business district located on the neighbouring Nakasero Hill.

However, the introduction of business premises on Kololo Hill, especially restaurants and bars, has increased noise and has introduced heavy traffic that interferes with the serenity and ambiance that was there before. Several irritated residents have jointly sued seven bars, accusing them of being the source of noise pollution. As of February 2019, the case was still winding through Uganda's court system.

== Points of interest ==
The following points of interest are found on Kololo hill:

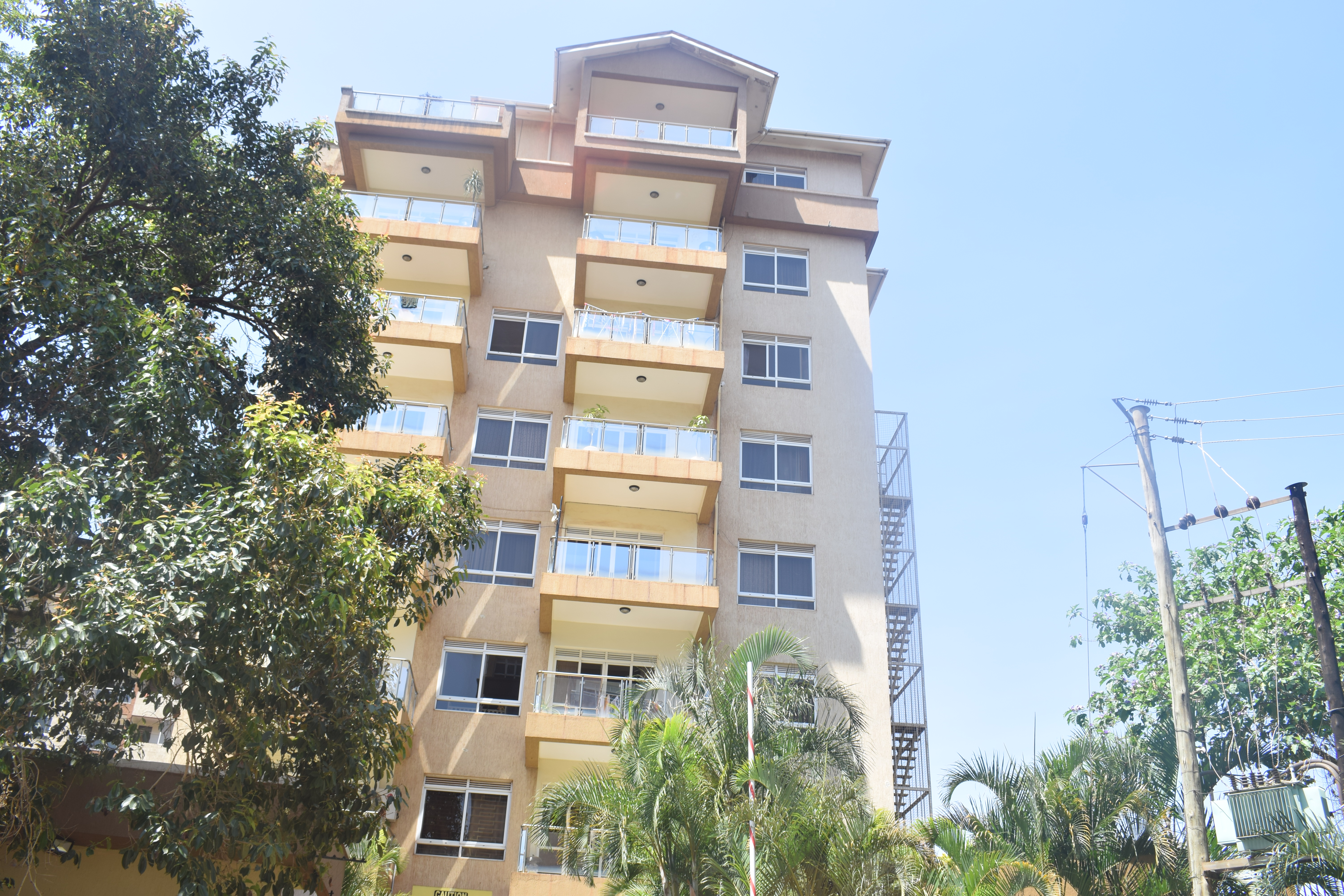
Prince Charles apartments.

- 7 Hills International School
- Arya Sumaj School
- Centenary Park
- East Kololo Primary School
- Embassy of Algeria
- Embassy of the People's Republic of China
- Embassy of the Democratic Republic of the Congo
- Embassy of Egypt
- Embassy of Germany
- Embassy of Sweden
- Embassy of Norway
- Embassy of Libya
- Embassy of North Korea
- Embassy of Russia
- Embassy of Rwanda
- Embassy of Saudi Arabia
- Embassy of South Africa
- High Commission of the Republic of Kenya
- Jinja Road Police Station
- Kampala Christian Cemetery
- Kampala Golf Course
- Kampala Hospital
- Kololo Airstrip
- Kitante Hill Secondary School
- Kololo High School
- Kololo Senior Secondary School
- Kololo Hospital
- "Uganda Sickle Cell Rescue Foundation"
- Lincoln International School
- Medipal International Hospital
- Uganda Management Institute
- Uganda National Museum
- French School
- MTN Sports Arena Lugogo

== Notable people ==
- Olive Kigongo, businesswoman

== Photos ==
- Photo of Kololo Hill

== See also ==
- Kabalagala
- Muyenga
- Mengo
