= Kampala Central Division =

Administrative division of Kampala, Uganda

Coordinates: 00°19′N 32°35′E

Kampala Central Division is one of the five divisions that make up Kampala, the capital of Uganda. The city's five divisions are Kampala Central Division, Kawempe Division, Lubaga Division, Makindye Division, and Nakawa Division.

== Location ==
The division comprises the central business district of the largest city in Uganda, and includes the areas of Old Kampala, Nakasero and Kololo. These areas are the most upscale business and residential neighborhoods in the city. The division also incorporates low income neighborhoods including Kamwookya, Kisenyi and Kampala's Industrial Area. The coordinates of the division are:0°19'00.0"N, 32°35'00.0"E (Latitude:0.316667; Longitude:32.583333). The division comprises about 20 parishes, including Bukesa, Civic Centre, Industrial Area, Kagugube, Kamwokya I, Kamwokya II, Kisenyi I, Kisenyi II, Kisenyi III, Kololo, Mengo, Nakasero, Nakivubo, and Old Kampala.

== Overview ==
The Kampala Capital City Authority (KCCA) was established in 2011, replacing the defunct Kampala City Council (KCC). During the first three years, the leaders of the new KCCA and of the Central division focused on improving sanitation and garbage disposal, preserving the environment and enforcing existing building and zoning laws. Having made progress during the first three years, the KCCA leadership was expected to shift focus to the repair and widening of the roadways and streets in the division, as well as decongesting the city center.

== See also ==
- Kololo
- KCCA
- Divisions of Kampala
- Nakasero
- Old Kampala
