= Makerere Kikoni =

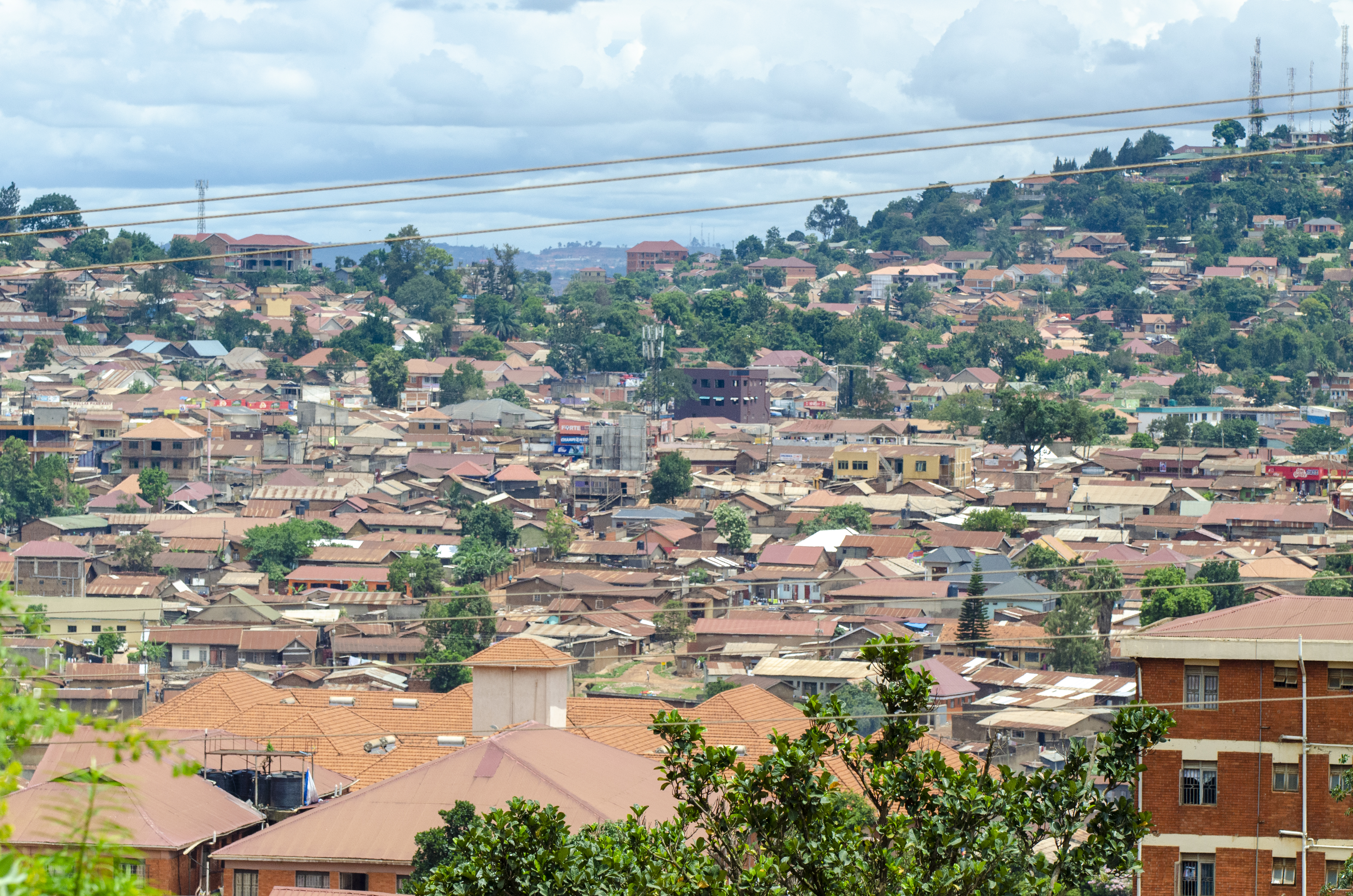
- Kikoni Slum

- Location in Uganda
- Coordinates: 00°20′06″N 32°34′12″E
- Country: Uganda
- Region: Central Uganda
- District: Kampala District
- Division: Kampala Central Division
- Elevation: 1,240 m (4,070 ft)
- Time zone: UTC+3 (EAT)

Makerere Kikoni is a neighbourhood located in Makerere.

== Location ==
Makerere Kikoni is located in Kawempe Division. It is bordered by Bwaise to the north, Makerere University to the east, Naakulabye to the southwest. Kasubi and Kawaala lie to the west of Makerere. This location lies approximately 2.5 kilometres (1.6 mi), by road, north of Kampala's central business district.

== History ==
Makerere Kikoni was mainly a slum in semi permanent structures. It is now mostly developed with hostels. The genesis of this development is traced to a policy adopted by Makerere University in the early 1990s, to admit private students. These students had to cater for their residence. Some residences were converted into hostels to house the students. In recent years, multi storey blocks have been put up to serve as hostels. Besides the hostels, Makerere kikoni is developed with supermarkets, churches, the most outstanding being University Church Fellowship (UCF), hotels like "The Grand Global hotel", "J Frigh Hotel", and"Sheron Hotel". It also has Schools like "Makerere Modern Secondary School" and "Caltec Academy", as well as residential developments.

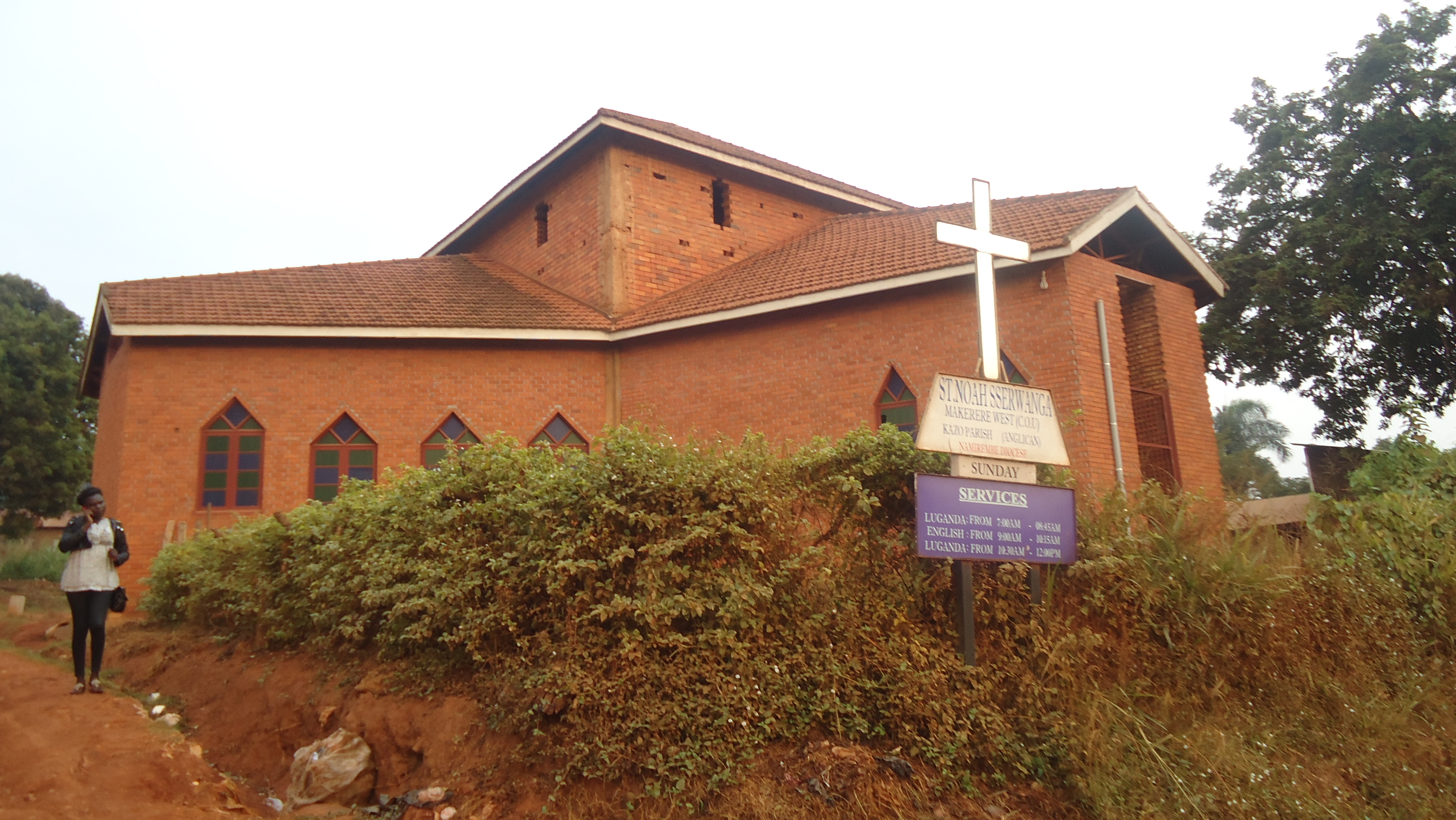
A church in Kikoni

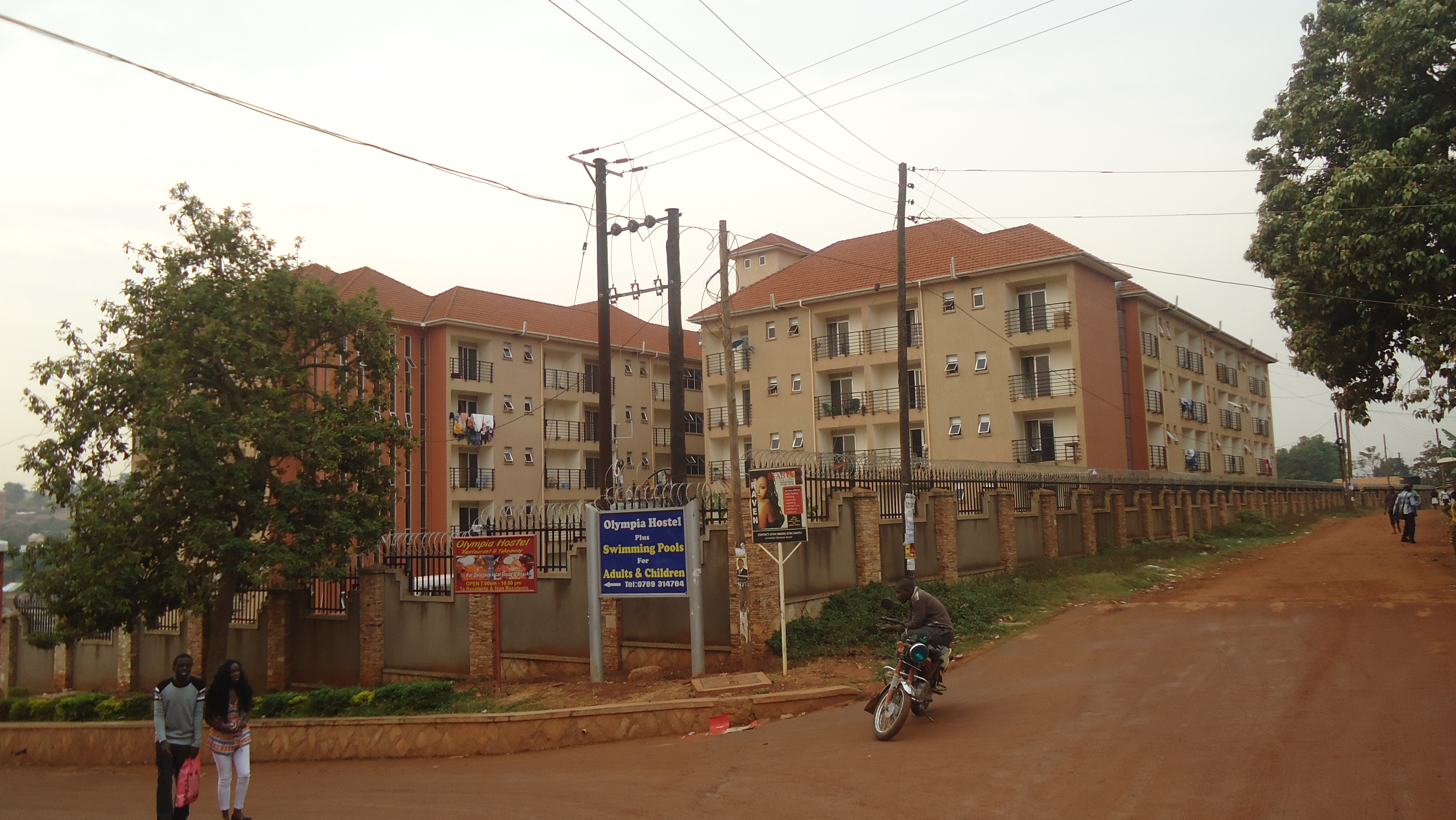
A hostel in Kikoni

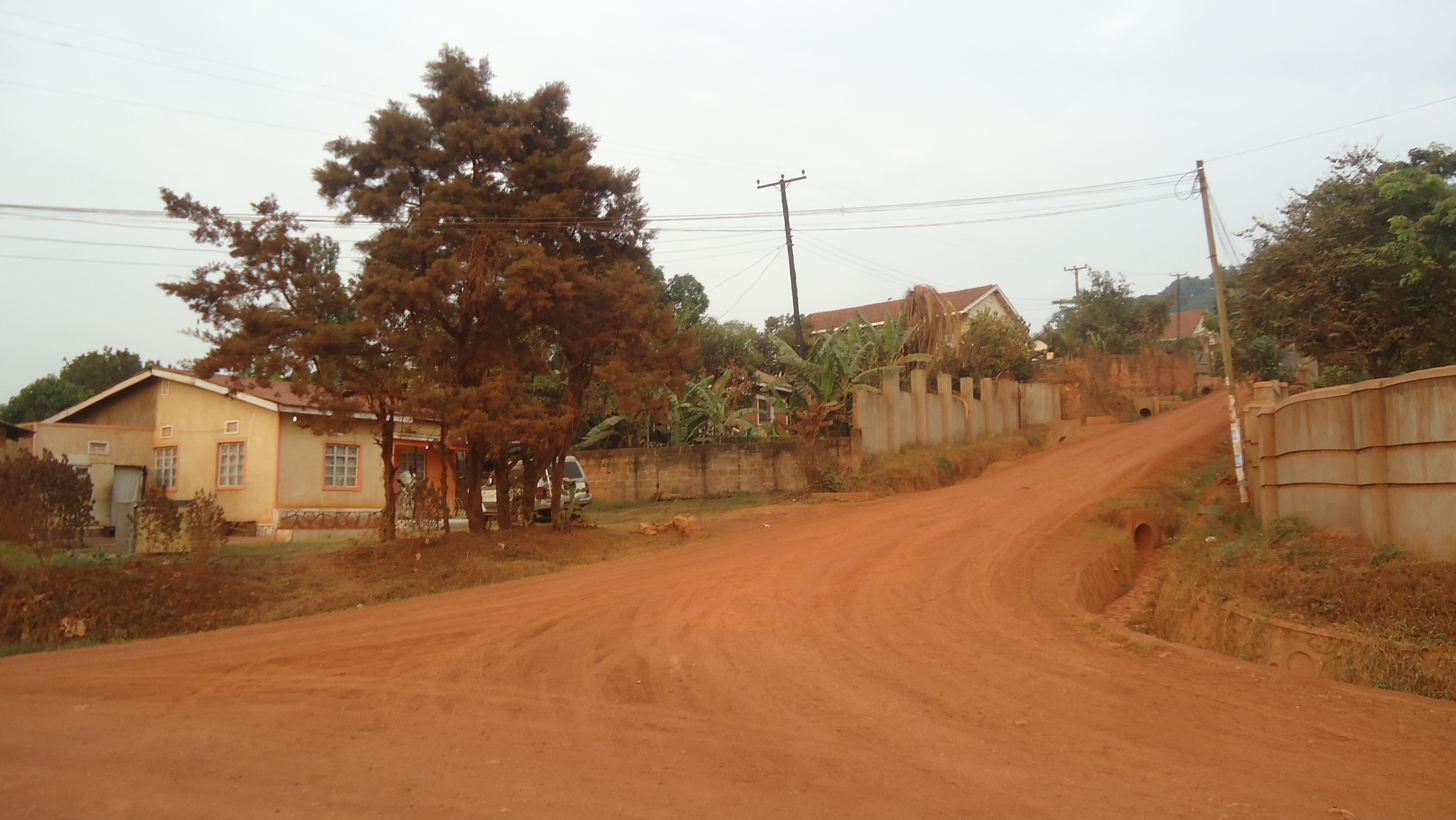
A residential section of kikoni

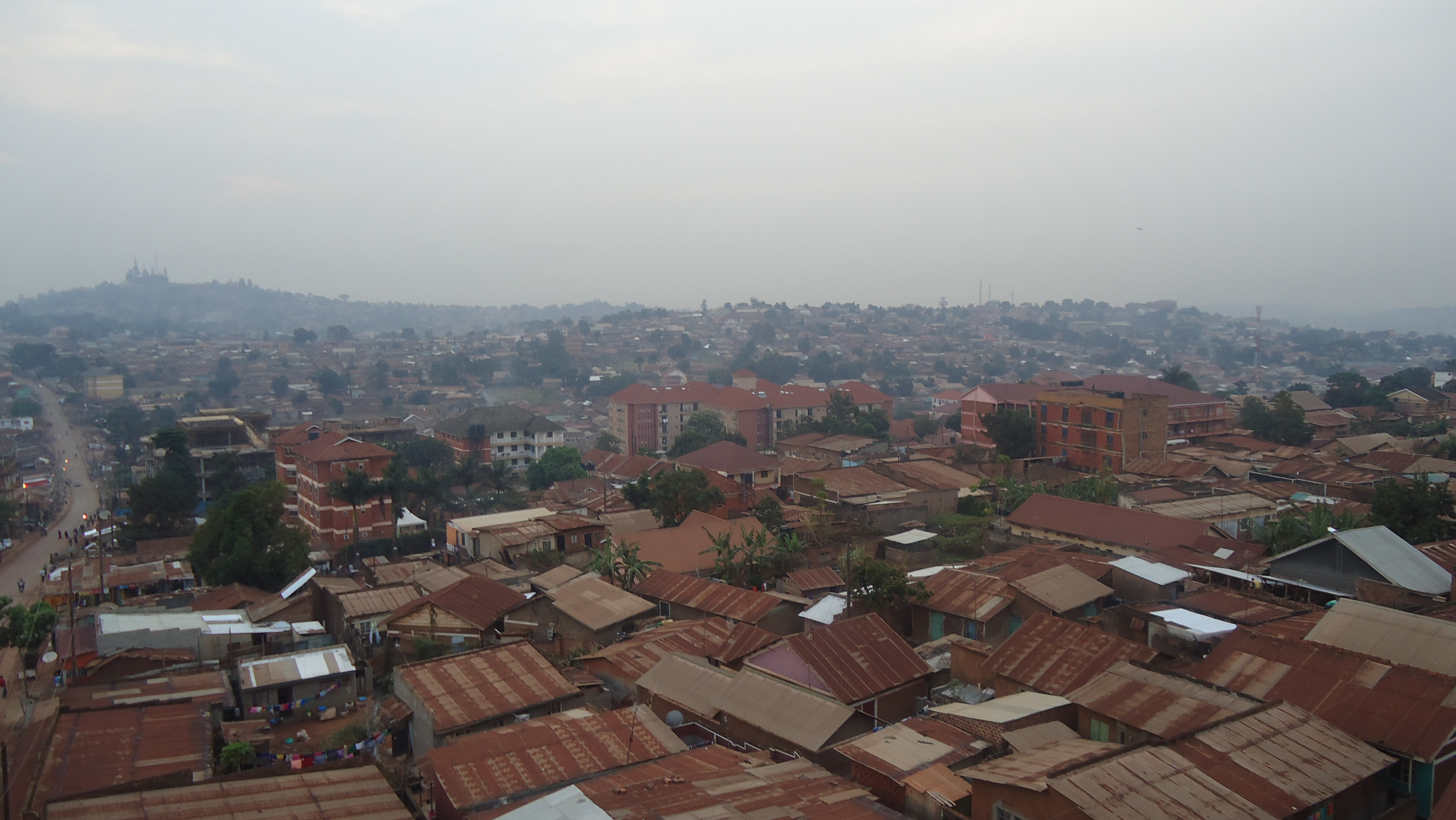
A section of kikoni

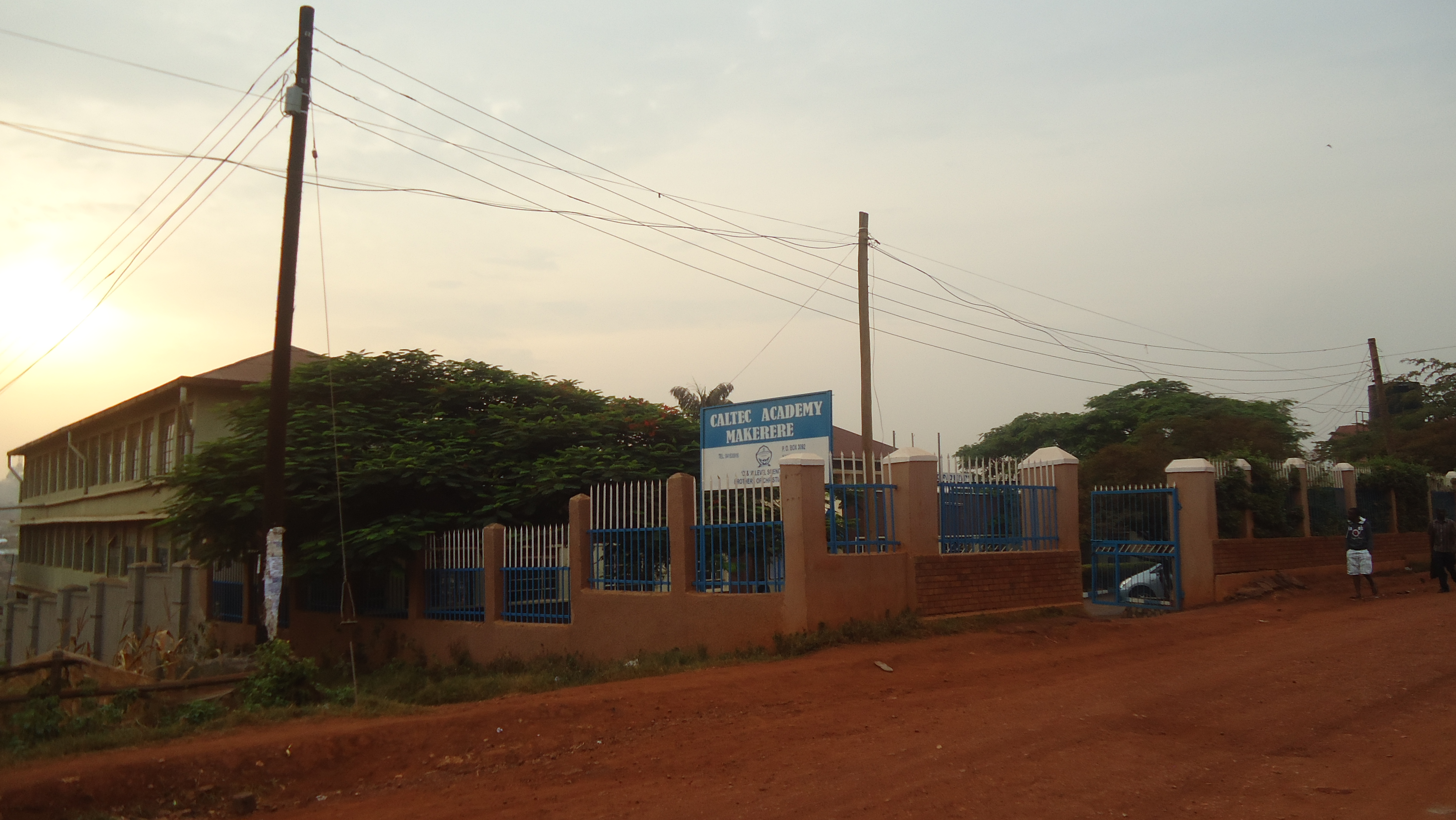
Caltec academy

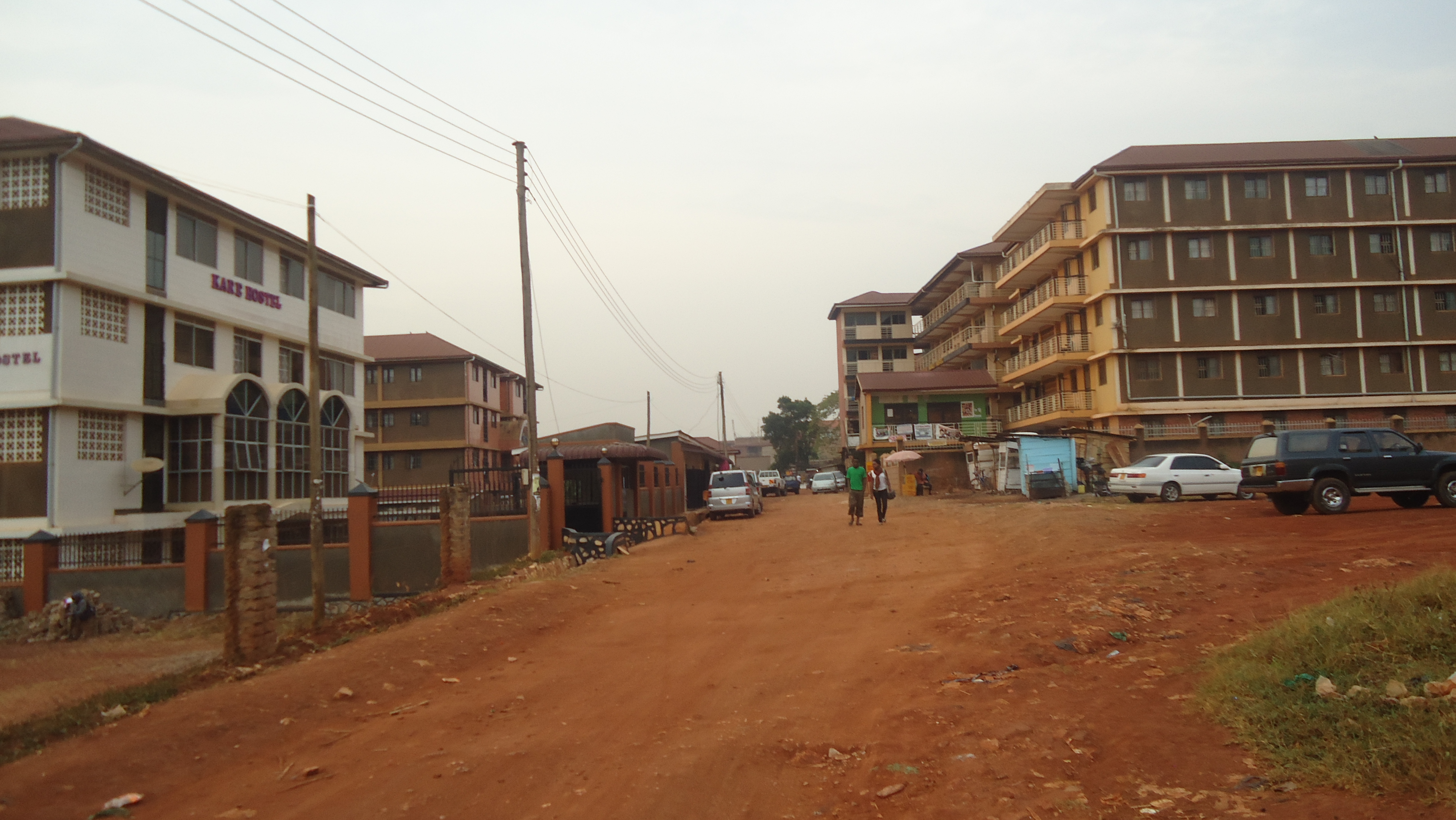
Hostels in Kikoni

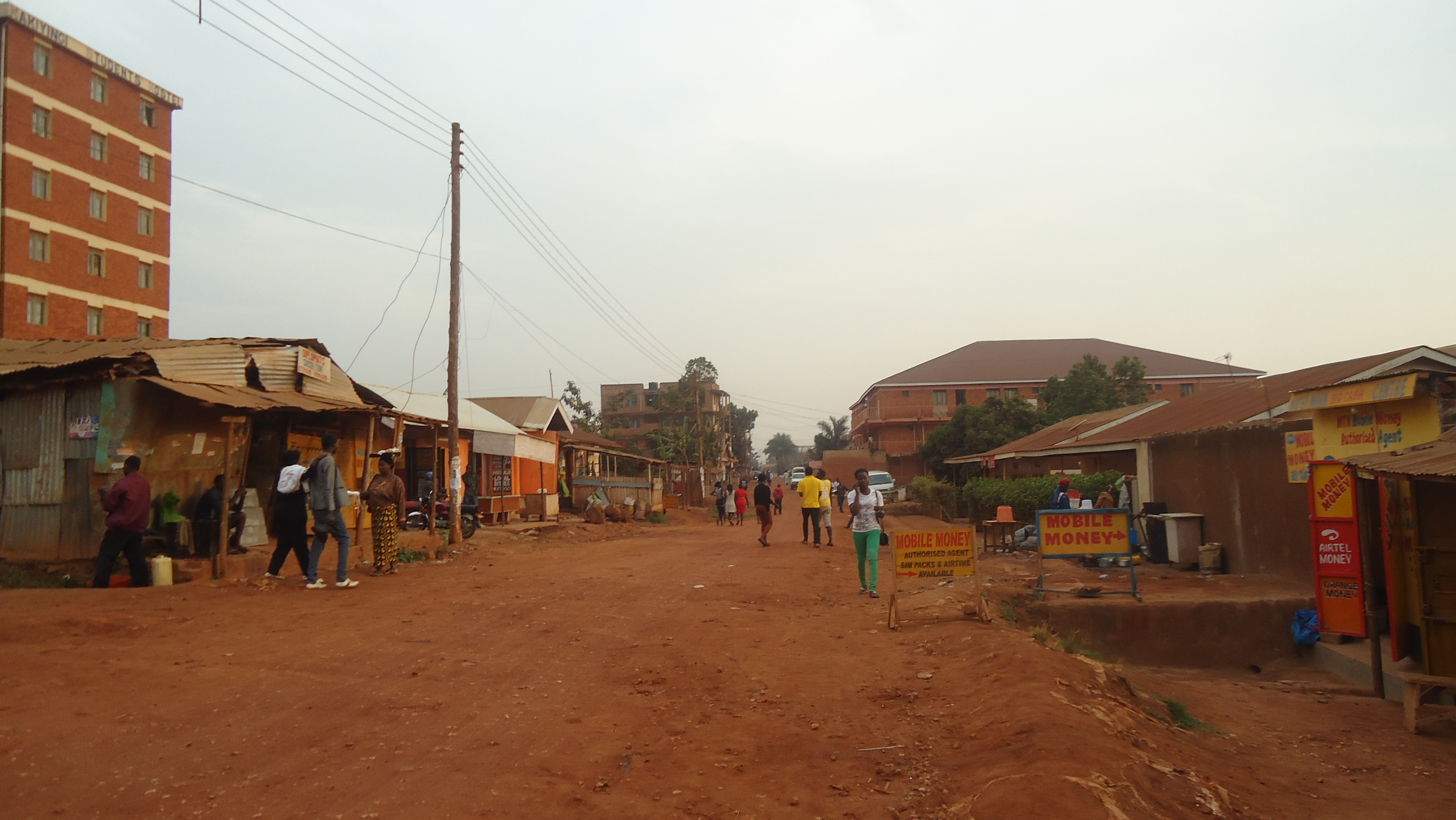
A road in Kikoni

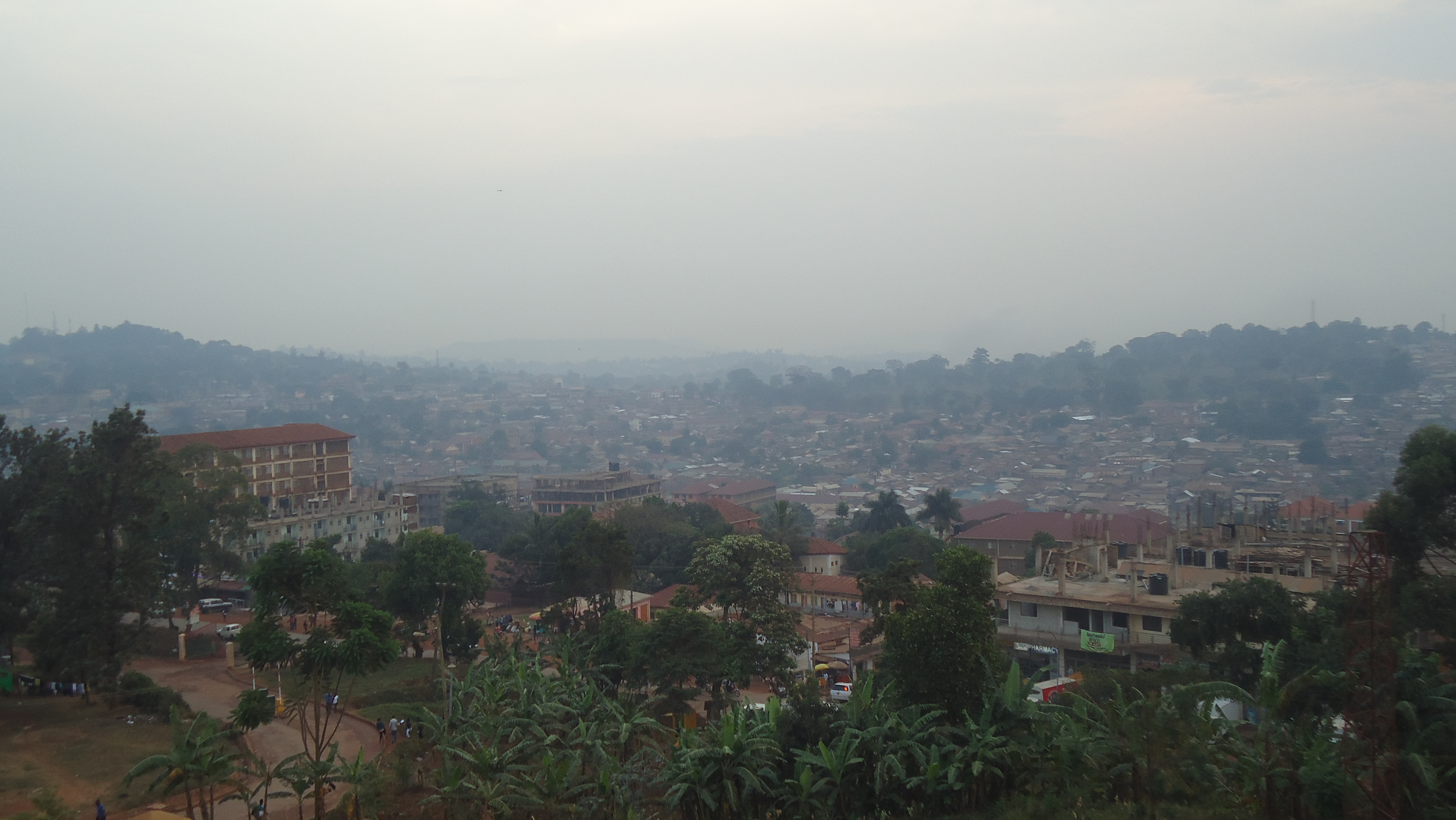
Aerial view of hostels in Kikoni

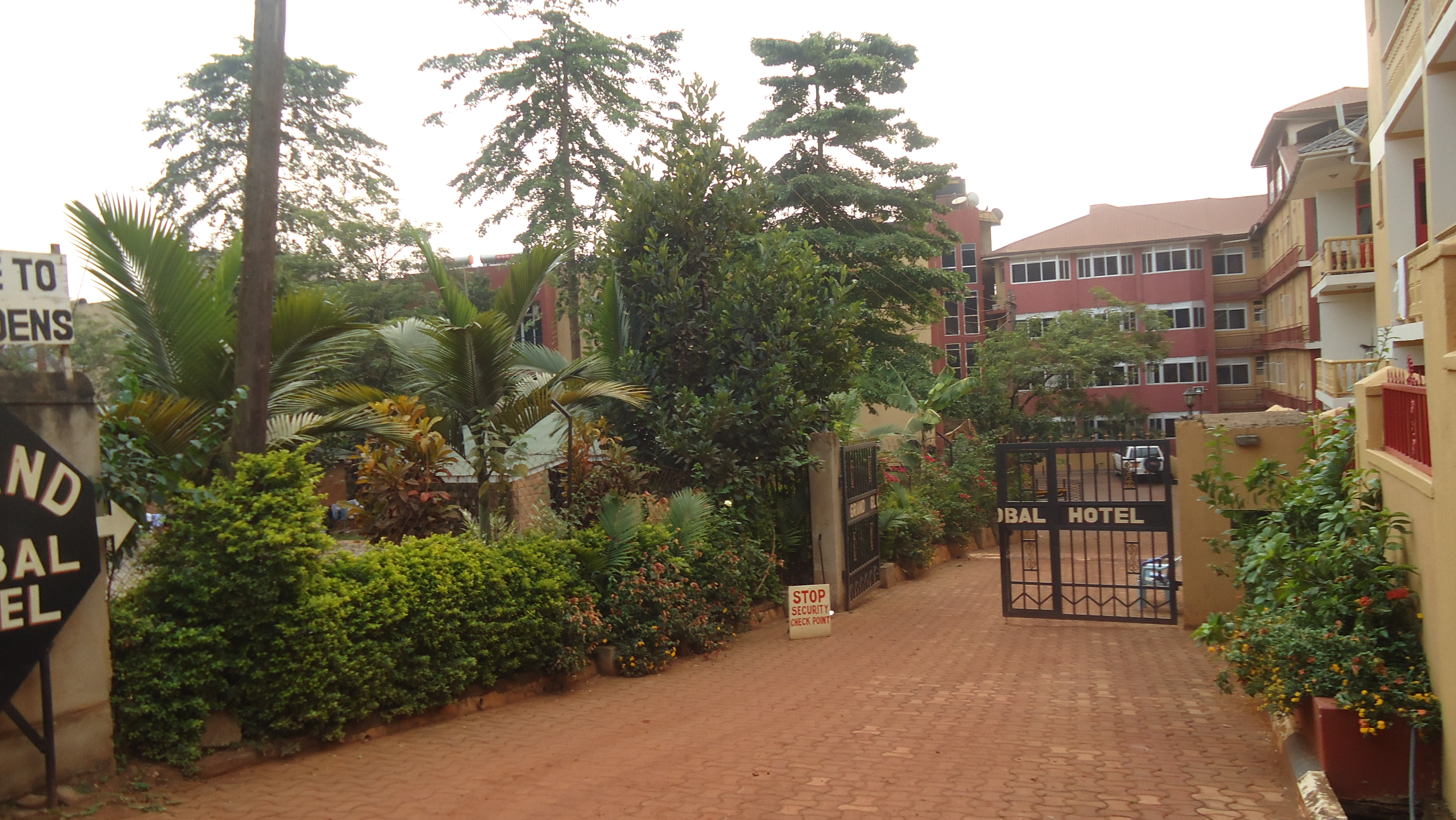
Grand global hotel

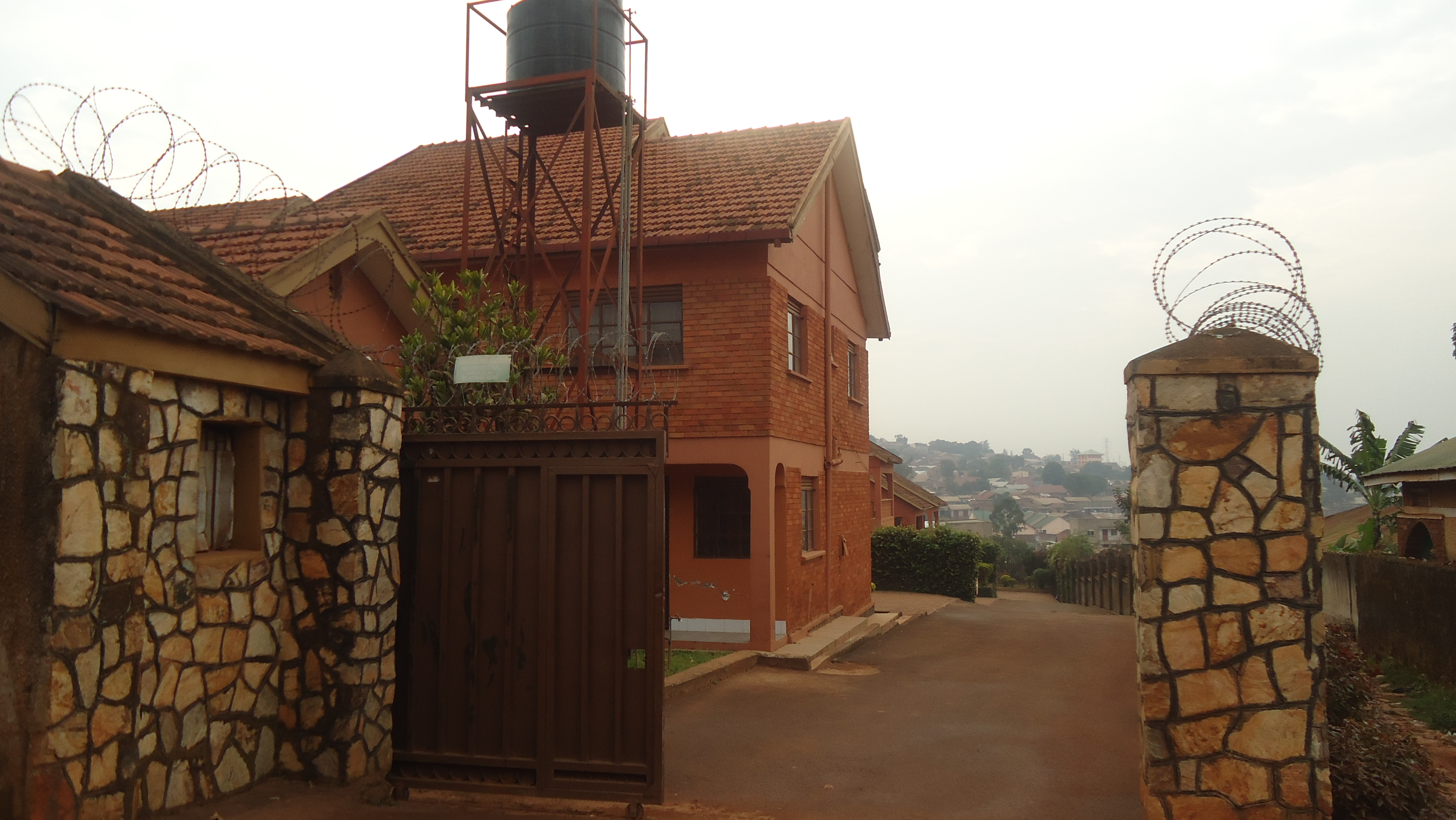
Residential houses in Kikoni

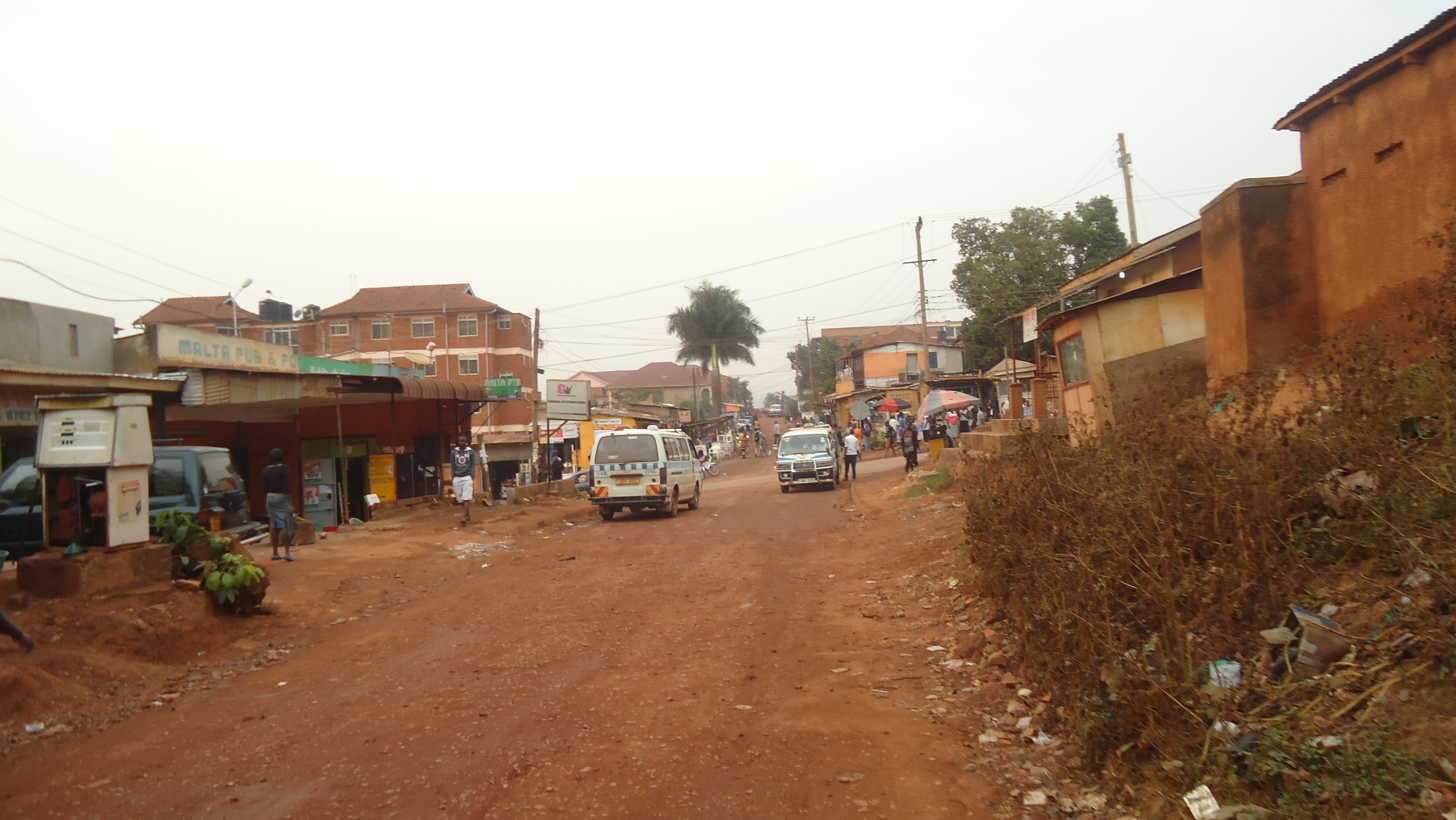
Taxis in Kikoni

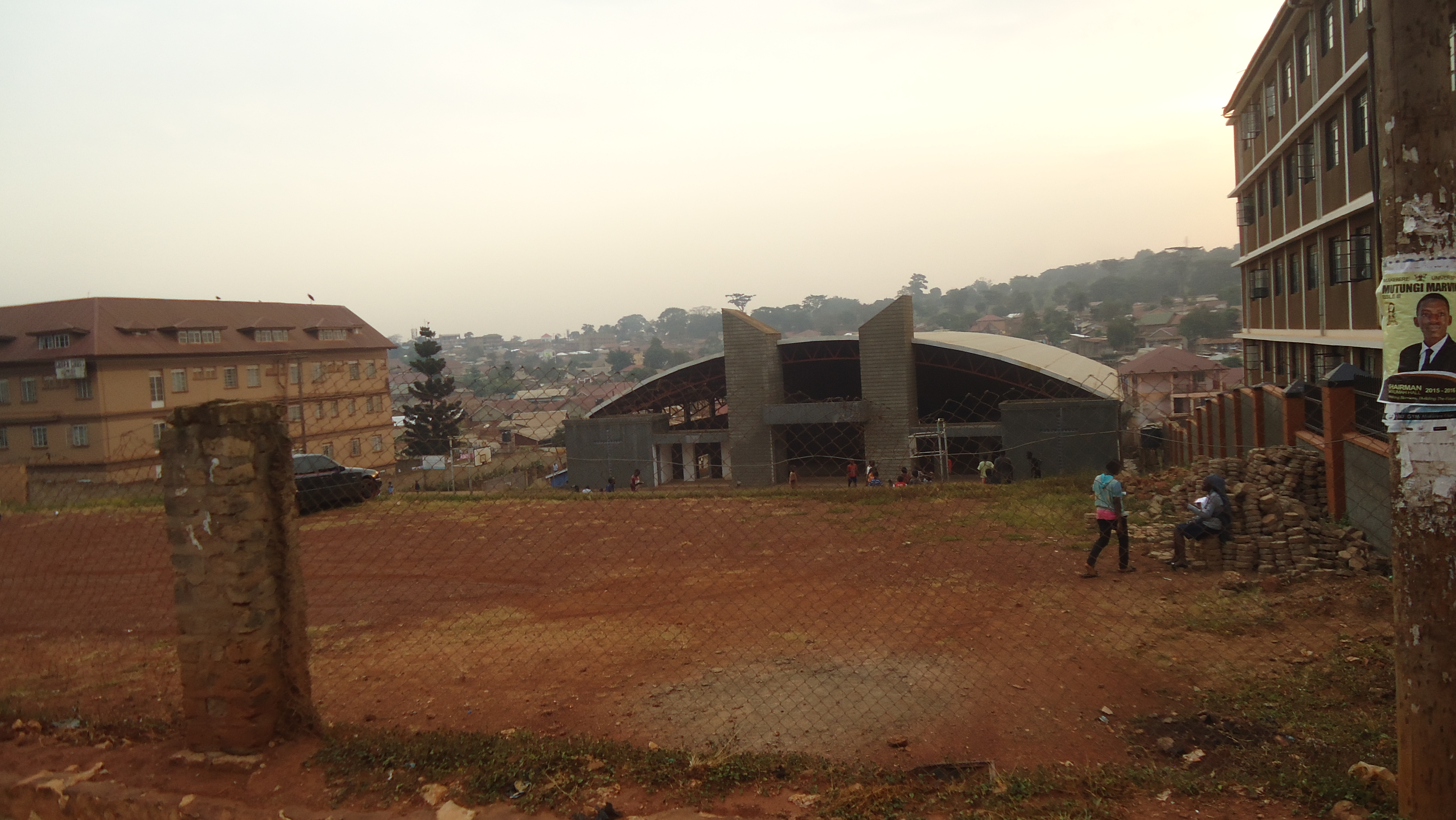
University Christian fellowship

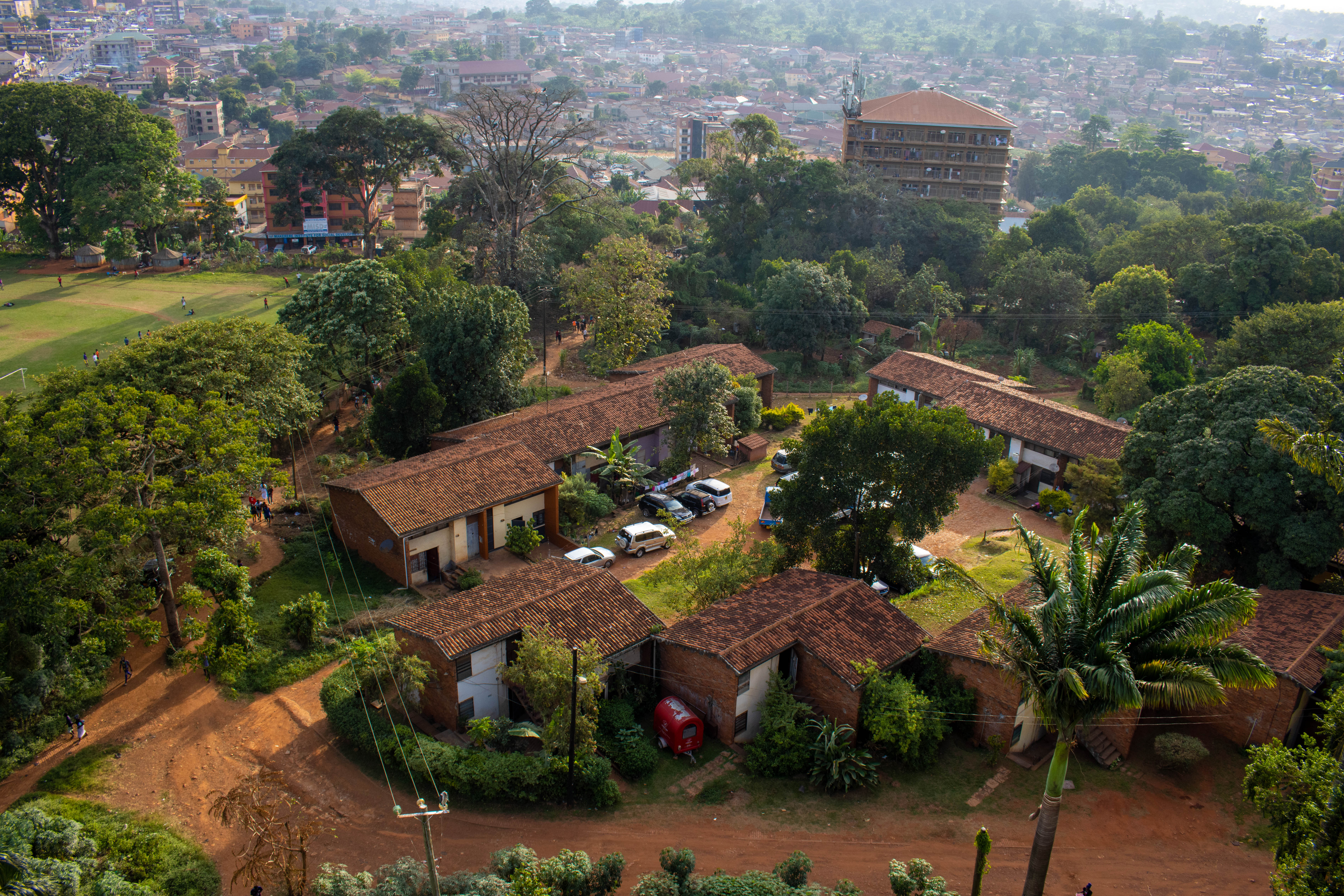
Houses in Kikoni
