= Anna Talia Oze =

Entertainer and media personality

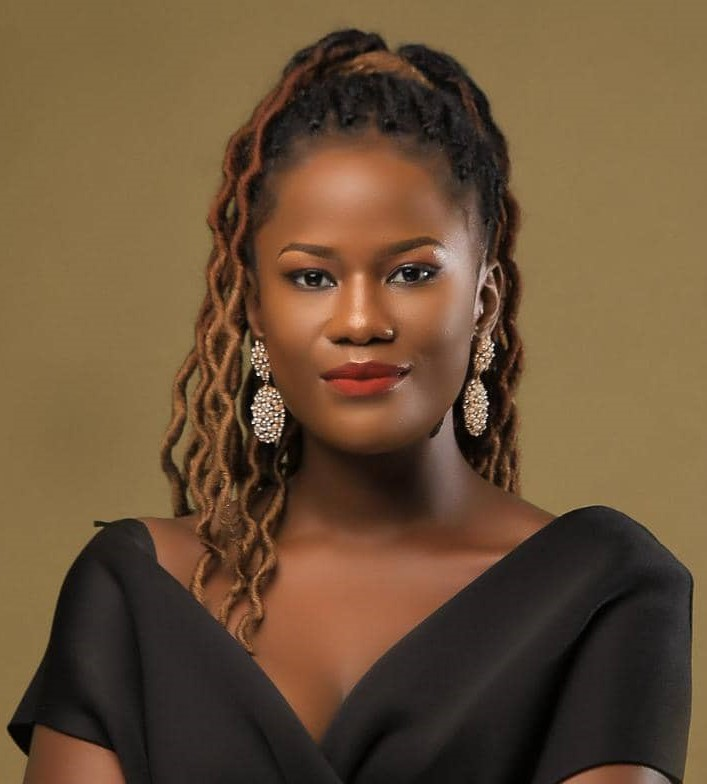
- Born: Annet Lillian Ruth Nambooze; 10th October, 1992; Lungujja
- Citizenship: Ugandan
- Education: Bachelor's of Arts in education, Makerere University and a Master's in Diplomacy and International duties, Victoria University
- Occupations: Former radio and TV presenter, founder of an organisation
- Employer(s): Urban TV, Record TV, Delta TV, Spark TV, NBS TV and Sanyuka TV
- Organization: Women for Her Uganda
- Spouse: Wallace Joseph Kafumbe
- Honours: Buzz Teeniez Awards, 2018

Annet Lillian Ruth Nambooze (born 10 October 1992), commonly known by her stage name Anna Talia Oze, is a teacher, humanitarian, and media personality. Oze is married to Wallace Joseph Kafumbe whom she met at university.

Oze is a former media personality, TV and radio host who worked at various media outlets including Urban TV, Record TV, Delta TV, Spark TV, NBS TV and Sanyuka TV. Further more, she is the founder of Women for Her Uganda, a non-government organization focused on women empowerment. She is an educationist who graduated from Makerere University with a Bachelors of Arts in education in 2016 and a Master's in Diplomacy and International duties at Victoria University.

== Early life and education ==
Anna Talia Oze was born and raised in Lungujja and Namirembe to Mr. and Mrs. Sebutinde; and she is the third child amongst four children. Her parents divorced when she was still in primary school and her grandfather, Wasswa Lule a politician and the son to the former Ugandan president Yusuf Lule took custody of her and her siblings.

She went to Lungujja Nursery school, St Mary's Nabbingo and Lungujja Primary Hill school for her nursery and primary education. She later on joined Alliance Secondary School, for her Ordinary level education (2005 to 2008) and Old Kampala Secondary School for her A level (2009 to 2010).

She joined Makerere University where she graduated with a Bachelor of Arts in Education (English and Literature) in 2016. In 2023, She graduated with a Masters in Diplomacy and International Studies at Victoria University.

== Career ==
During her senior six vacation, Oze started campus 1on1, a university program hosted on Urban TV for 3 years. After this, she joined a series of TV stations such as Record TV, for 6 months, Delta TV, for 3 months and later on Spark TV where she hosted an entertainment news show called Live-wire. In 2018, she left Spark TV and joined Next Media Uganda, a national broadcasting service which owns NBS TV and Sanyuka TV among others. While there, she hosted the "Uncut," an entertainment show which was aired on both TV stations concurrently. She also worked at Radio 4 103.3 Fm owned by the current minister of Local Government Balaam Barugahara and left in 2020.

Oze is also a host and Master of Ceremonies (MC) who has hosted a number of events such as the Abryanz style and fashion awards in 2017, and the Africa Magic viewer's choice awards in 2018. Her emceeing started while she was in school and from then, she was one of the MCs at Hotel International Muyenga and Jarcaranda Mengo.

In 2014, Oze carried out her teaching practice at King's College Budo.

As part of her humanitarian work, she runs a project called Women for Her under which she focuses on empowering young women and mothers in Uganda through mentorship and life skills.

Oze is the founder of Catalina Events (which focuses on corporate, institutional and premuim social experiences and celebration) and Catalina weddings.

=== Political career ===
In 2021, Oze joined elective politics by contesting for the position of Lord Woman councilor, Rubaga North B constituency which she lost to Nakiridde Solome Ssebina.

== Awards ==
Over the years in her television career, Oze was nominated twice for the RTV academy awards as best female TV personality and best dressed media personality. These awards are held annually in Uganda to honor outstanding media personalities and contributors to the local broadcasting industry among others. In 2018, she won the best TV show (Live Wire) Buzz teeniez awards.

== See also ==
- Buzz Teeniez Awards
- Gabie Ntate
- NBS
