= Kabaddi Federation of Uganda =

Governing body of Kabaddi Sport

KFU
- Kabaddi Federation Uganda
- Abbreviation: KFU
- Founded: 1 January 2017; 9 years ago
- Founded at: Rubaga, Kampala
- Type: Federation of national associations
- Legal status: Not-for-profit
- Headquarters: Nalukolongo, Rubaga
- Coordinates: 00°18′11″N 32°33′11″E
- Region served: Uganda
- Members: 10 clubs
- Official languages: English
- President: Aminah Buyinza
- General Secretary: Edgar Mujuni
- Head Of Partnerships: Jacob Kato
- Website: www.kabaddifu.co.ug

The Kabaddi Federation of Uganda (KFU) is the governing body of Kabaddi in Uganda.Kabaddi, is a contact sport, native to the Indian subcontinent. The Kabaddi Federation of Uganda was founded in 2017 and its affiliated to International Kabaddi Federation since 2017. It organises both the men as well the women's national Kabaddi team and organises the Uganda Kabaddi League.

== Location ==
The Kabaddi Federation of Uganda headquarters are located on Plot 12/16, Mapeera road, Nalukolongo, Rubaga Division in Kampala District.

== Organisation ==
Established in 2017 and registered with the National Council Of Sports in 2019 certified the Kabaddi Federation of Uganda as one of the sports in the country. It is affiliated with the International Kabaddi Federation.

== Competition ==
In November 2019, Uganda Kabaddi team competed in the Junior World Kabaddi Championship which took place in Iran.
