= Namirembe Hill =

Namirembe
- Map of Kampala showing the location of Namirembe
- Coordinates: 00°18′54″N 32°33′34″E
- Country: Uganda
- Region: Central Region
- District: Kampala Capital City Authority
- Division: Lubaga Division
- Elevation: 1,260 m (4,130 ft)
- Time zone: UTC+3 (EAT)

Namirembe is a hill in Kampala, Uganda's capital and largest city. It is also a common name given to girls in several Baganda clans. Namirembe comes from the Luganda word "mirembe" meaning peace. Namirembe loosely translates into Full of Peace. Legend has it that this hill was a gathering place for celebrating peace or war victories.

== Location ==
Namirembe is bordered by Makerere to the north-east, Old Kampala to the east, Mengo to the south-east, Lubaga to the south-west, Lungujja to the west, the Kasubi Tombs to the north-west, and Naakulabye to the north. The distance, by road, from the central business district of Kampala to Namirembe is approximately 4 kilometres (2 mi). The coordinates of Namirembe Hill are 0°18'54"N, 32°33'34"E (Latitude:0.315000; Longitude:32.559444). Namirembe Hill rises to a peak of 4,134 feet (1,260 m) above mean sea level.

== St. Paul's Cathedral Namirembe ==
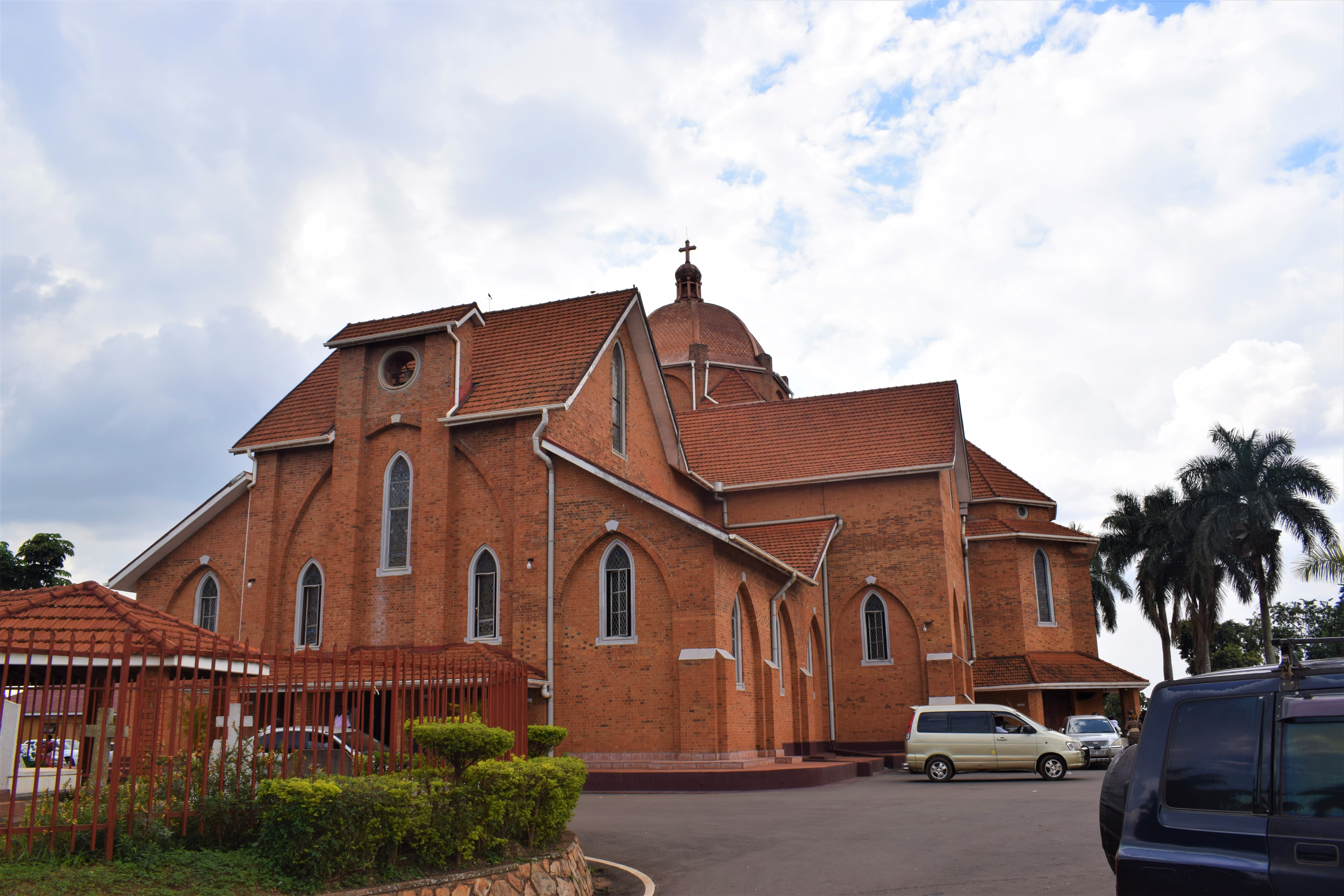
Namirembe Cathedral

Namirembe Hill has been the location of the main Anglican place of worship in Buganda since Bishop Alfred Tucker established the offices of the Diocese of Eastern Equatorial Africa in 1890.

Namirembe is the location of St. Paul's Cathedral, Namirembe. This was the main place of worship of the Anglican Church in Uganda from completion of its construction in 1919 until the 1960s when the cathedral became the seat of the Diocese of Namirembe. At that time, the headquarters of the Church of Uganda moved to All Saints Church in Nakasero but later on moved back to Namirembe. The Anglican Faith is the religion most closely associated with the Buganda Monarchy since the end of the religious wars of the 1890s.

== Overview ==
The hill rises 1,260 metres (4,130 ft) above sea level. It is adjacent to Mengo Hill, the seat of the Buganda government. The history of the two hills is intertwined, geographically, politically, and religiously.

The 300-bed Mengo Hospital is a community hospital affiliated with the Church of Uganda. It is also known as Namirembe Hospital. It was the first hospital in Uganda and was started by Albert Ruskin Cook in May 1897.

At the north-western base of Namirembe Hill are the Buganda royal burial grounds known as the Kasubi Tombs. It is here that the last four kings of Buganda have been buried.

The Bulange Complex includes Buganda's parliament building, known as the "Lukiiko", The complex is on Namirembe Hill, just across from Mengo Hill. The Mengo Palace on Mengo Hill is connected to the Bulange Complex by a straight road, about a mile long, called the "Kabaka Anjagala Road" ("The King Loves Me" in English). About halfway, the straight road is intersected by Lubaga Road. There is a roundabout for the use of ordinary travelers. However, there is a strait-way through the roundabout with a gate. That is for the exclusive use of the Kabaka when moving between the palace and the parliament building. Tradition forbids the king from going round the roundabout. He must travel straight when moving between the two locations.

== Additional points of interest ==
The following additional points of interest lie on or near Namirembe Hill:

- Headquarters of the Province of the Church of Uganda.
- Residence of the Archbishop of the Church of Uganda.
- Residence of the Bishop of Namirembe Anglican Diocese.
- Mengo Senior School a public mixed day school.
- Sanyu Babies Home – An orphanage managed by a non-governmental organization.

== See also ==
- Kampala Capital City Authority
- Lubaga Division
