= Kasubi hill =

Kasubi
- Map of Kampala showing the location of Kasubi.
- Coordinates: 00°19′52″N 32°33′20″E
- Country: Uganda
- Region: Central Region
- District: Kampala Capital City Authority
- Division: Lubaga Division
- Elevation: 1,220 m (4,000 ft)
- Time zone: UTC+3 (EAT)

Kasubi is a hill in Kampala, Uganda's capital and largest city.

== Location ==
Kasubi is bordered by Kawaala to the north, Makerere to the east, Naakulabye to the southeast, Lusaze to the southwest, Lubya to the west, and Namungoona to the northwest. The hill is approximately 5.5 kilometres (3.4 mi), by road, northwest of Kampala's central business district. The coordinates of Kasubi are 0°19'52.0"N, 32°33'20.0"E (Latitude:0.331115; Longitude:32.55555632).

== History ==
Before 1856, Kasubi Hill was known as Nabulagala. Sometime after that date, Muteesa I of Buganda, having met misfortune at Banda Hill, where he had built his first palace, relocated to Nabulagala. He renamed the hill Kasubi, after the ancestral village of his mother, located in then Kyaggwe County, what today is known as Mukono District. Today, Buganda traditionalists refer to the place interchangeably as Kasubi or Nabulagala or Kasubi-Nabulagala. After his death in 1884, Kabaka Muteesa I was buried at Kasubi, the first Kabaka to be buried there. Since then, Kasubi has become the official royal burial site of the Buganda monarchy. The Kasubi Royal Tombs are recognized as a World Heritage Site and are of very high significance in the culture of the Baganda.

== Overview ==
Kasubi Hill is a royal cultural site of the Kingdom of Buganda, one of the constitutional traditional monarchies in 21st century Uganda.

== Landmarks ==
The most significant landmark on Kasubi Hill are the Kasubi Royal Tombs, the official burial place of the Kings of Buganda. As of June 2014, four consecutive Kings of Buganda are buried at Kasubi:

- Muteesa I of Buganda in 1884.
- Mwanga II of Buganda, died in exile in 1903, re-buried at Kasubi in 1910.
- Daudi Cwa II of Buganda in 1939.
- Muteesa II of Buganda, died in exile in 1969, re-buried at Kasubi in 1971.

== Other points of interest ==
Other points of interest in the neighborhood include:

- Kasubi Medical Clinic, a community health clinic operated by Hope Medical Clinics Uganda Limited, a Ugandan charitable organization, founded by two United States non-governmental organisations.
- branch of Pride Microfinance Limited
- Kasubi central market
- Kampala–Hoima Road, passes through the neighborhood in a general north-south direction.
