= Namungoona =

- Map of Kampala showing the location of Namungoona.
- Coordinates: 00°19′59″N 32°32′03″E
- Country: Uganda
- Region: Central Uganda
- District: Kampala Capital City Authority
- Division: Lubaga Division
- Elevation: 1,200 m (3,900 ft)
- Time zone: UTC+3 (EAT)

Namungoona is a neighborhood within Kampala, Uganda.

== Location ==
Namungoona is bordered by the unincorporated Wakiso District to the west, northwest and to the north, the Kampala–Hoima Road and Kawaala to the east, Kasubi to the southeast, Lubya and Lusaze to the south and Busega to the southwest. This location is approximately 6.5 kilometres (4.0 mi), by road, northwest of the downtown area of Kampala.

== Demographics ==
Namungoona is primarily a middle-income residential neighborhood, including high-rise apartment complexes and semi-detached family housing., with middle-class single-family residences interspersed between the apartment towers.

== Transport and facilities ==
The Kampala Northern Bypass Highway passes through Namungoona. Also located in this area is the headquarters of the Uganda Orthodox Church, together with a hospital and two schools.

== Points of interest ==
The following points of interest are found in or near Namungoona:

- The headquarters of the Uganda Orthodox Church
- Chwa II Memorial College and Namungoona Orthodox Primary School
- Holy Cross Mission Hospital - A private hospital administered by the Uganda Orthodox Church

== See also ==
- KCCA
- Northern Bypass
- NHCC
- Lubaga Division
- Central Uganda
