= Westnile Distilling Company Limited =

Ugandan beverage company

Westnile Distilling Company Limited is a private beverage company that started in Arua, Uganda. It manufactures gin, mineral water, and glucose solution.

== Genesis ==
Although conceived as an idea in 1972, factory construction started at a fast pace in Arua around 1978. Then civil wars and instability halted work plus forced the company's founders into exile. When Uganda regained peace, construction was resumed in 1989 and finished.

== Arson attack ==
In 2005, arsonists struck and burnt down the 4 Billion UgX factory on Ujuo Road (behind Arua Public Secondary School). Manufacturing lines and products worth millions were destroyed, but the concrete tower still remains. The rest of the factory was saved by Civil Aviation Authority trucks from Arua Airfield after the company owner Dr Eric Adriko phoned the CAA Deputy Managing Director Dr. Makuza. Meanwhile, the LC 1 Chairman and residents protected the other units.

== Recovery ==
In January 2007, a new factory was reborn out of the ashes and relocated to Plot 6 - 12 Makamba Road, Lungujja, in a neighbourhood named Kosovo (within Kampala). The company launched Hunters Gin plus its own 'Sunshine Mineral Water' extracted from underground rocks on the new premise. It had now joined the mineral water craze gripping Uganda. With a process and machinery unique in East and Central Africa, it continues to produce its products: Adrikos 7 Hills Vodka, White Rhino Gin and Rum Raggi.

The company has a strict policy against consumption of alcohol by Under 18s.

== See also ==
- Alcohol
