= Wasswa Lule =

Ugandan politician

- Born: 18 December 1949 (age 76)
- Citizenship: Uganda
- Education: King's College Budo
- Alma mater: Makerere University, University of Lagos (Bachelor of Science in Accounting)
- Occupations: Accountant and politician
- Years active: 1994–2001
- Title: Member of Parliament

Wasswa Lule (born December 18, 1949) is a Ugandan politician and former member of parliament for Lubaga North. He is the son of the former president of Uganda, Yusuf Lule who was a minister in the colonial government, Vice chancellor of Makerere University and assistant secretry general in the CommonWealth Secretariat. He is a member of the Democratic Party of Uganda.

== Early life and education background ==
Wasswa was born on 18 December 1949 to Yusuf Lule and Hannah Namuli Wamala Lule. He attended Nakasero Primary School in Kampala, and from there he joined King's College Budo and later Makerere College School. Wasswa attended Makerere University for one semester because of a scholarship awarded to him by the Association of African Universities. He later enrolled at the University of Lagos in Nigeria in 1972, where he graduated with a Bachelor of Science in accounting.

== Career ==
Wasswa was employed as an Audit Manager with the British firm Gill and Johnson Chartered Accountants up to 1972, which was then based at Black Lines House in Kampala. He later served as an Accountant-in-Charge with Deloitte Haskins and Sells Chartered Accountants in England until 1981.

From 1981 to 1985, he worked as Managing Auditor at Philips Industries. Thereafter, Wasswa joined Lloyds Bank PLC in London, where he served until 1989 as Head Office Inspector.

In 1986, President Yoweri Museveni appointed Wasswa as Deputy Inspector General in the Government Inspectorate, a position he assumed in 1989.

In 1994, Wasswa contested for the Constituent Assembly and became the representative for Lubaga North. From 1996 to 2001, he represented Lubaga North in Parliament. On Wednesday 6th 1999, Wasswa Lule the member of parliament for Rubaga North was arrested for interrogation at his home in Lungujja, makamba zone over utterances which attacked the person of the president and are likely to raise disaffection against the person of the president and government of Uganda; an offence under the penal code.

In 2001, Wasswa Lule withdrew from the presidential race to head Francis Bwengye's national campaign team. Lule who was the Lubga North MP then reportedly stepped down for Francis Bwengye another DP stalwart.

== See also ==
- Yusuf Lule
- Amama Mbabazi
- Apollo Nsibambi
- Parliament of Uganda
