= Lubaga =

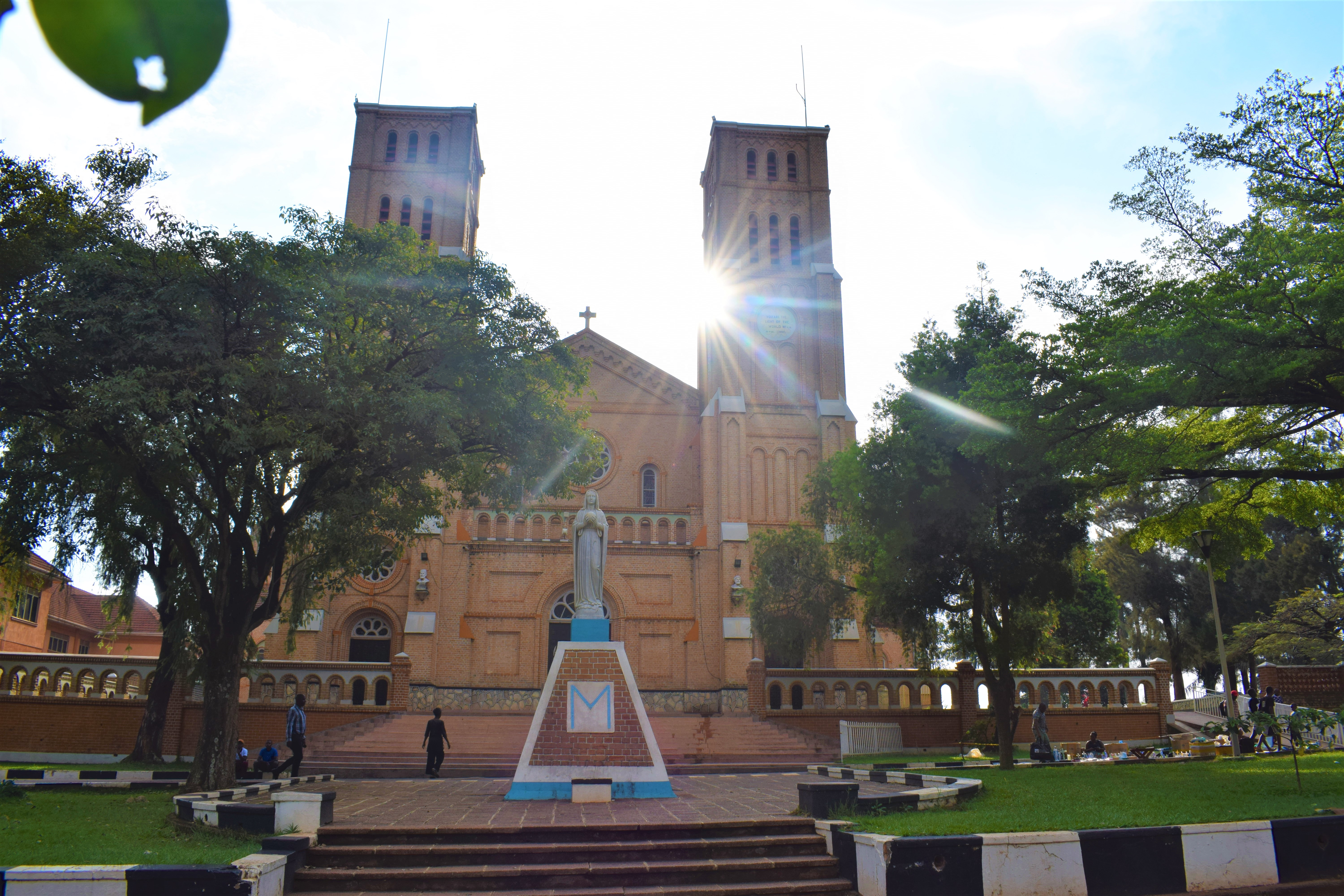
- Lubaga

- Map of Kampala showing the location of Lubaga
- Coordinates: 00°18′11″N 32°33′11″E
- Country: Uganda
- Region: Central Uganda
- District: Kampala Capital City Authority
- Division: Lubaga Division
- Elevation: 1,220 m (4,000 ft)
- Time zone: UTC+3 (EAT)

Lubaga is a hill in Kampala, Uganda's capital and largest city. The name comes from the Luganda word okubaga, describing a process of "planning" or "strengthening" a structure while constructing it. For example, okubaga ekisenge means to strengthen the internal structure of a wall while building a house. The name also applies to the neighborhood on the hill.

== Location ==
Lubaga is bordered by Mengo to the east, Namirembe to the northeast, Kasubi to the north, Lubya to the northwest, Lungujja and Busega to the west, Nateete to the southwest, Mutundwe to the south and Ndeeba to the southeast. The coordinates of Lubaga are 0°18'11.0"N, 32°33'11.0"E (Latitude: 0.303056; Longitude: 32.553056). The distance, by road, from the central business district of Kampala to Lubaga is approximately 3 kilometres (1.9 mi).

== History ==
The hill served as the location of one of the palaces of the King of Buganda from the 18th century. Kabaka Ndawula Nsobya, the 19th Kabaka of Buganda, who ruled from 1724 until 1734, maintained his capital on Lubaga Hill. The palace on Lubaga Hill was used to plan military expeditions by Buganda's generals. In the late 19th century, during the reign of Muteesa I Mukaabya Walugembe Kayiira, who reigned from 1856 until 1884, the palace caught fire and was abandoned. When the Catholic White Fathers came calling in 1879, they were allocated present-day Kitebi village. Eventually they were given land on Lubaga Hill itself where they built Rubaga Cathedral, beginning in 1914 and completed in 1925.

The early missionaries had problems pronouncing the word Lubaga as it is correctly spelled. They instead pronounced it with an "R", as Rubaga. In the Luganda language, there is no word that starts with an "R", "X" or "Q". Other Bantu languages from western Uganda and the African Great Lakes Area, however, do have words starting with "R".

== Overview ==
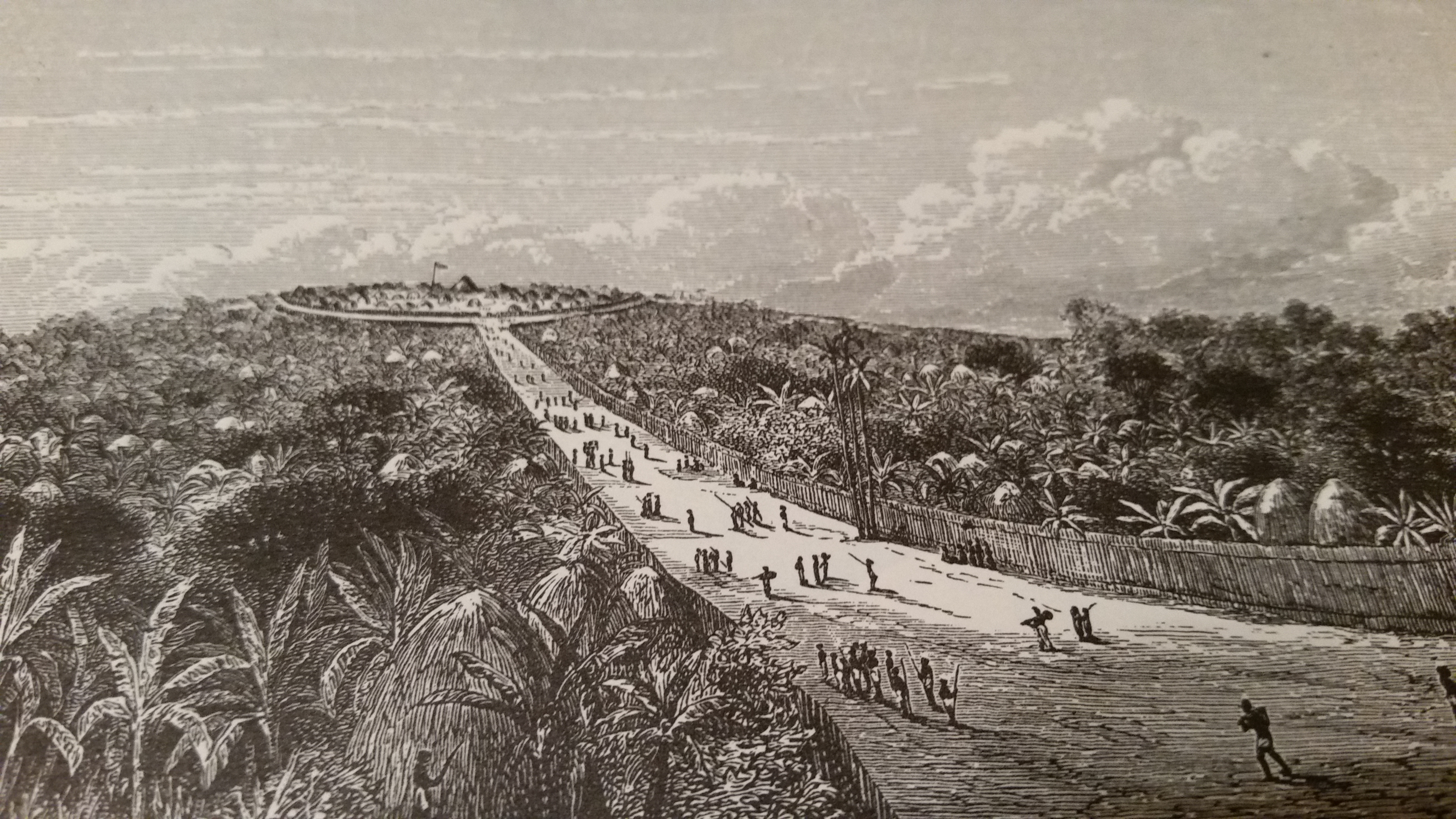
Rubaga

Lubaga Hill was the location of the main palace of Kabaka Muteesa I, who ruled Buganda between 1856 and 1884. The palace was struck by lightning and burnt to the ground. In 1882 the king's (Kabaka's) palace was relocated to present-day Kasubi hill were Kabaka Muteesa I died and was buried in that palace and as all subsequent dead Kings of Buganda are at this Kasubi Tombs on Kasubi hill. The first Roman Catholic missionaries to arrive in Buganda were Frenchmen, Father Pierre Lourdel Monpel and Brother Amans, who settled near the hill in 1879.

As the Catholic Church took root in the country, the missionaries were allocated land on Lubaga Hill. The construction of St. Mary's Cathedral on Lubaga Hill took place between 1914 and 1925, with the assistance of monetary contributions from Roman Catholic congregations abroad. Later, the missionaries also built a hospital and a nursing school on the hill.

Today, Lubaga remains the seat of the headquarters of the Catholic Church in Uganda. It is the seat of the Roman Catholic Archdiocese of Kampala. The remains of the first African Catholic bishop in Uganda, Bishop Joseph Nakabaale Kiwanuka and those of the first African Catholic cardinal, Cardinal Emmanuel Kiwanuka Nsubuga are kept in the Catholic mission on the hill.

== Points of interest ==
The following points of interest are located on Lubaga Hill:

- Saint Mary's Cathedral Rubaga
- Residence of the cardinal of Kampala
- Residence of the archbishop of Kampala Archdiocese
- Lubaga Hospital - officially Uganda Martyrs Hospital Lubaga, a 300-bed community hospital administered by the Catholic Archdiocese of Kampala
- Lubaga Nurses School
- Lubaga Miracle Center - a place of worship affiliated with the Pentecostal Movement
- Pope Paul VI Memorial Community Center
- Headquarters of Lubaga Division - one of the five administrative divisions of the city of Kampala
- Lubaga Campus of Uganda Martyrs University, whose main campus is at Nkozi in Mpigi District
- Pope Paul VI Social Club - home of the Rotary Club of Rubaga, a member of Rotary International

== See also ==
- KCCA
