= Nateete =

- Map of Kampala showing the location of Nateete.
- Coordinates: 00°17′54″N 32°32′06″E
- Country: Uganda
- Region: Central Uganda
- District: Kampala Capital City Authority
- Division: Lubaga Division
- Elevation: 1,190 m (3,900 ft)
- Time zone: UTC+3 (EAT)

Nateete is a location in the city of Kampala, Uganda's capital.

== Location ==
Nateete is located in Lubaga Division, on the southwestern edge of the city of Kampala. It is bordered by Busega to the north, Lungujja to the northeast, Lubaga to the northeast, Ndeeba to the southeast, Mutundwe to the south and Buloba to the west. The road distance between Kampala's central business district and Nateete is approximately 8 kilometres (5.0 mi).

== Overview ==
Nateete lies on the main highway (A-109), between Kampala and Masaka. There is a major intersection in Nateete, where the highway to Mityana, Mubende, Fort Portal and on to the Democratic Republic of the Congo splits off the highway to Masaka, Mbarara, Kabale and on to Kigali in Rwanda. At the same location, the Kampala Northern Bypass, a double carriageway highway bypassing downtown Kampala, re-joins the highways to the Rwanda and the Congo, having split off the Kampala-Jinja Highway at Namboole, in Kira.

Today, Nateete is a busy, growing metropolitan area with businesses, small industries, retail shops and a thriving farmers market. Many of Uganda's banking institutions maintain branches in the area due to the booming business in commercial and retail banking in the neighborhood. Uchumi, a leading supermarket chain in East Africa, maintains a branch in the neighborhood. Nateete is known for the pothole filled road spanning from Nateete-Kibuye rd all the way to Busega despite authorities' regular renovation efforts.

== Prominent Structures in the town ==
- Nateete Business Center, the most iconic building in the town.

== See also ==
- KCCA
- Northern Bypass
- Lubaga Division
- Entebbe Expressway
- Kyengera
