= Lubaga Hospital =

Private, non-profit, community, teaching hospital in Uganda

Uganda Martyrs' Hospital Lubaga
- Roman Catholic Archdiocese of Kampala

Geography
- Location: Lubaga Hill, Kampala, Central Region, Uganda
- Coordinates: 00°18′15″N 32°33′10″E

Organisation
- Care system: Private, Not for profit
- Type: Community
- Affiliated university: Uganda Catholic Medical Bureau

Services
- Emergency department: I
- Beds: 275

History
- Founded: 1899; 127 years ago

Links
- Website: Homepage
- Other links: Hospitals in Uganda; Medical education in Uganda

Uganda Martyrs' Hospital Lubaga, commonly known as Lubaga Hospital, which was formerly named Rubaga Hospital, is a private, not-for-profit, community hospital in Kampala, the capital city of Uganda.

== Location ==
The hospital is located on Lubaga Hill, in Lubaga Division, in the western part of Kampala. It is located approximately 5.5 kilometres (3 mi), southwest of Mulago National Referral Hospital. This is approximately 5 kilometres (3 mi), west of Kampala's central business district. The coordinates of Lubaga Hospital are: 0°18'15.0"N, 32°33'10.0"E (Latitude:0.304167; Longitude:32.552778).

== Overview ==
Lubaga Hospital was started in 1899 by the Missionary Sisters of Our Lady of Africa. It is reported to be the oldest Catholic hospital in Uganda. It is owned by the Roman Catholic Archdiocese of Kampala and is accredited by the Uganda Catholic Medical Bureau (UCMB). The hospital is governed by a Board of Governors appointed by the Archbishop of Kampala. Lubaga Hospital is managed by the Executive Director. The hospital is affiliated to UCMB. It also functions as the teaching hospital for the St Micheal Lubaga Hospital Training Institutes.

== Operations ==
The hospital had a bed capacity of 274, as of December 2019. At that time, patient user fees accounted for 83.3 percent of the total hospital annual income, while subsidies from the government of Uganda accounted for 1.4 percent of total hospital annual income. Institutional and individual donations as well as contribution by the Roman Catholic Diocese of Kampala, cover the remaining 15.3 percent.

Lubaga Hospital attends to 164,008 outpatients annually, averaging 450 outpatients daily, Monday through Sunday, including holidays. On average, 17,850 in patients are admitted every year, leading to a bed occupancy ratio of 62.5 percent. 6,832 babies are born at the hospital every year on average, with a caesarian section rate of 25.6 percent.

== Developments ==
In August 2023 the hospital opened the Rita Moser Organ Transplant Centre, a dedicated super-specialized facility capable and authorised to carry out human transplant operations, starting with kidneys and later expected to expand into liver, cornea and other organs. Dr. Rita Moser was the first medical superintendent (medical director) at this hospital. Lubaga Hospital is the first private hospital in Uganda to establish an organ transplant centre.

== See also ==
- KCCA
- Kampala
- Uganda Hospitals
- Lubaga Division
- Uganda Medical Schools
