= Lungujja =

- Location in Kampala
- Coordinates: 00°18′36″N 32°32′24″E
- Country: Uganda
- Region: Central Uganda
- District: Kampala Capital City Authority
- Division: Lubaga Division
- Elevation: 3,900 ft (1,190 m)

Lungujja is a neighborhood within Kampala, Uganda's capital and largest city.

== Location ==
Lungujja is located in Lubaga Division, one of the five administrative divisions of Kampala. It is bordered by Lubya to the north, Mengo to the east, Lubaga to the southeast, Nateete to the south and Busega to the west. This location is approximately 5 kilometres (3.1 mi), by road, southwest of Kampala's central business district. The coordinates of Lungujja are:0°18'36.0"N, 32°32'24.0"E (Latitude:0.3100; Longitude:32.5400).

== Overview ==
Lungujja is primarily a middle-income residential neighborhood, with upscale residencies mixed in with the more modest homes. Kamaanya Road, which runs from Busega to the west to Sentema Road to the east, passes through Lungujja. Mackay College, a private institution of secondary education, is located in Lungujja. During the 2000s, Lungujja has been plagued by an increase in crime, particularly, armed robbery, both random and pre-meditated.

Lungujja remains one of the few residential neighborhoods of Kampala City that is yet to experience the rapid unplanned housing development rise common in so many other areas bordering the capital city. This could partly be attributed to minimal land segmentation resulting from old existing landlords not wishing to sub-divide land and sell off to pseudo developers. This has resulted in a relatively low population density in the area compared to other locales within or neighboring the capital city of Kampala.

Development of public infrastructure has been rather slow in Lungujja. Only a few roads have been tarmacked. The National Water grid extends through the whole neighborhood. Electricity supply remains as unreliable as with other areas in Kampala. Lungujja can be accessed by road from Kampala city using Sir Albert Cook Road, also known as Namirembe - Nateete Road. Lungujja has been a residence of important individuals in the history of Uganda, they include Edward SSEKANDI Abu Mayanja, Katikiro Paulo Kavuma and Michael Kawalya Kagwa.

== Points of interest ==
The following points of interest lie within or near Lungujja:

- Lungujja Progressive Nursery and Primary School - it also provides Daycare services
- Westnile Distilling Company Limited - A private company that manufactures gin, mineral water and glucose solution
- Mackay College - A private institution of secondary education
- Need for All Children's Home (NACH) - A charitable home for needy children
- Lungujja Progressive School - A private, mixed, non-residential elementary school
- Lungujja Police Station - A police station belonging to the Uganda National Police
- Lungujja Community Health Caring Organization (LUCOHECO) - A grassroots community organisation that supports preventive health and the caring of the sick, particularly from HIV/AIDS
- The Lungujja Campus of Uganda Pentecostal University
- Muzza Nganda Social Club - A 30+ year old organisation established by community elders to promote cohesiveness and communal growth in residents living within Lungujja and surrounding areas.
- Kitunzi Market - A communal village market that has been in operation for decades primarily selling garden produce. Nothing happens in Lungujja and goes unnoticed here.

== See also ==
- Kampala
- Northern Bypass
- Kampala District
- Lubaga Division
