= Kawaala =

- Map of Kampala showing the location of Kawaala.
- Coordinates: 00°20′24″N 32°33′00″E
- Country: Uganda
- Region: Central Uganda
- District: Kampala Capital City Authority
- Division: Lubaga Division
- Elevation: 1,220 m (4,000 ft)
- Time zone: UTC+3 (EAT)

Kawaala is a neighborhood within Kampala, Uganda's capital and largest city.

== Location ==
Kawaala is bordered by Nabweru to the north, Kazo to the northeast, Makerere to the east, nsanze to the south, Kasubi to the southwest, and Namungoona to the west. This is approximately 5 kilometres (3.1 mi), by road, north of Kampala's central business district.

== See also ==
- Kampala District
- Kampala Northern Bypass Highway
- Lubaga Division
- Kasubi Tombs
