= Rubaga Division =

Division of Kampala, Uganda

Coordinates: 00°18′N 32°33′E

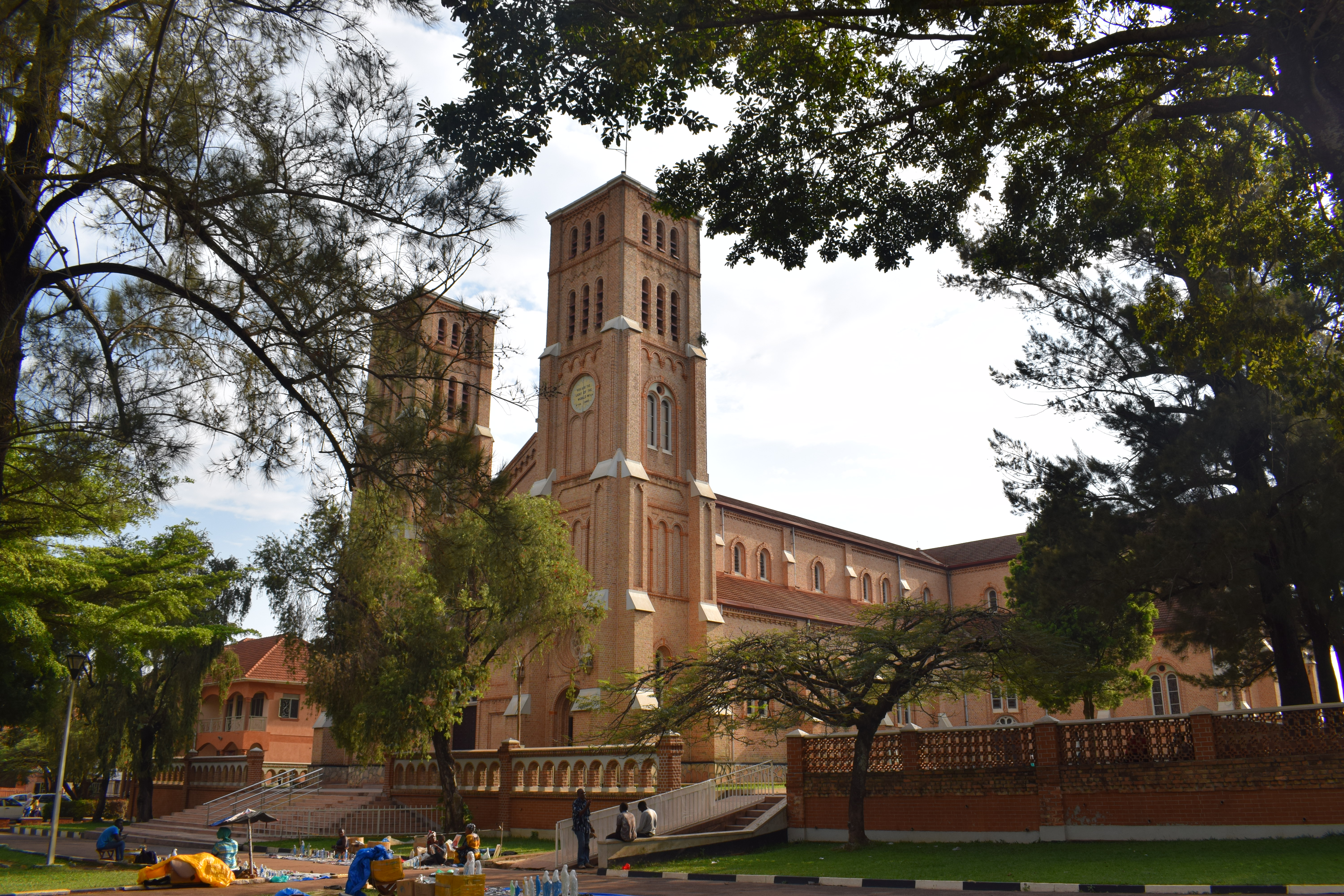
Rubaga Cathedral in Rubaga division

Rubaga Division, also Lubaga Division, is one of the divisions that makes up the city of Kampala, Uganda. The division takes its name from Rubaga, where the division headquarters are located.

== Location ==
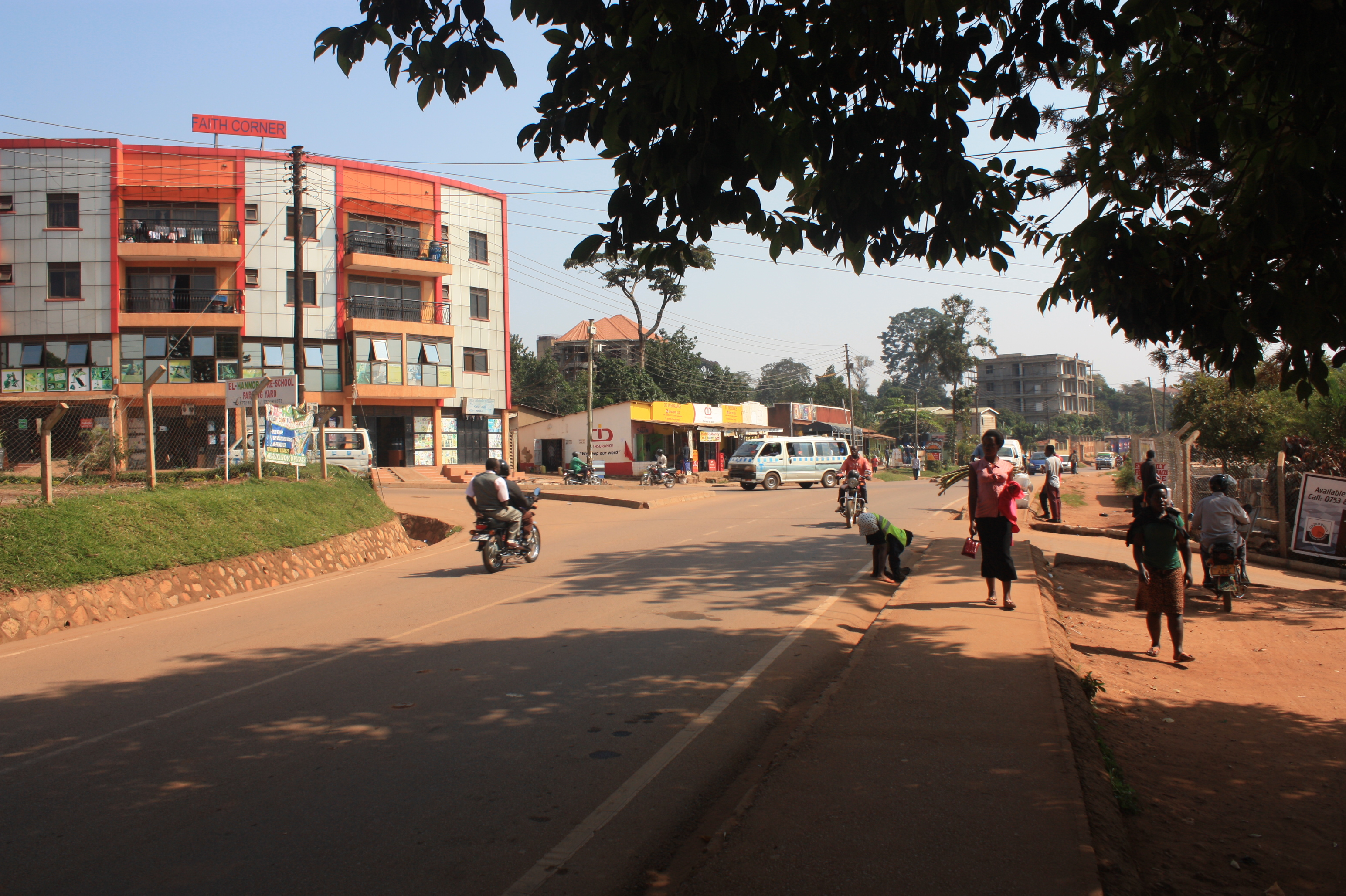
Rubaga Road junction

Rubaga Division lies in the western part of the city, bordering Wakiso District to the west and south of the division. The eastern boundary of the division is Kampala Central Division. Kawempe Division lies to the north of Rubaga Division. Neighbourhoods in the division include Mutundwe, Nateete, Ndeeba, Kabowa, Najjanankumbi, Lungujja, Busega, Lubaga, Mengo, Namungoona, Lubya, Lugala, Bukesa, Namirembe, Naakulabye, Kasubi, and Kawaala.

== Points of interest ==
The following points of interest are located in Rubaga Division:

- Saint Mary's Cathedral Rubaga
- Residence of the cardinal of Kampala
- Residence of the archbishop of Kampala Archdiocese
- Lubaga Hospital - a 274-bed community hospital owned by the Catholic Archdiocese of Kampala
- Mengo Palace - the Lubiri is located in Rubaga Division
- Bulange - houses the Buganda Parliament and offices of the Kabaka of Buganda

== See also ==
- Divisions of Kampala
- Mengo, Uganda
- Nakasero
