= Makerere =

Makerere, Kampala
- Map of Kampala showing the location of Makerere.
- Coordinates: 00°20′06″N 32°34′12″E
- Country: Uganda
- Region: Central Uganda
- District: Kampala Capital City Authority
- Division: Kampala Central Division
- Elevation: 1,240 m (4,070 ft)
- Time zone: UTC+3 (EAT)

Makerere (/məˈkɛrəri/ mə-KERR-ər-ee) is a neighborhood in the city of Kampala, Uganda's capital city. The name also applies to the hill on which this neighborhood is perched; one of the original seven hills that constituted Kampala at the time of its founding, in the early 1900s.

== Location ==
Makerere is located in Kawempe Division. It is bordered by Bwaise to the north, Mulago to the east, Wandegeya and Nakasero to the southeast, Old Kampala to the south, Naakulabye to the southwest. Kasubi and Kawaala lie to the west of Makerere. This location lies approximately 2.5 kilometres (1.6 mi), by road, north of Kampala's central business district. The coordinates of Makerere are:0° 20' 6.00"N, 32° 34' 12.00"E (Latitude:0.3350; Longitude:32.5700).

== Overview ==
Makerere Hill is occupied primarily by Makerere University. In the 1970s and 1980s, the university had nine Halls of Residence, six for men and three for women. During the 1990s and early 2000s, as the university intake and student population grew from about 5,000 to over 40,000, private hostels grew up all around the hill, outside the university compound, to accommodate the new student influx. The original halls of residence are:

For men
1. Livingstone Hall 2. Lumumba Hall 3. Mitchell Hall 4. Nkrumah Hall 5. Nsibirwa Hall and 6. University Hall.:

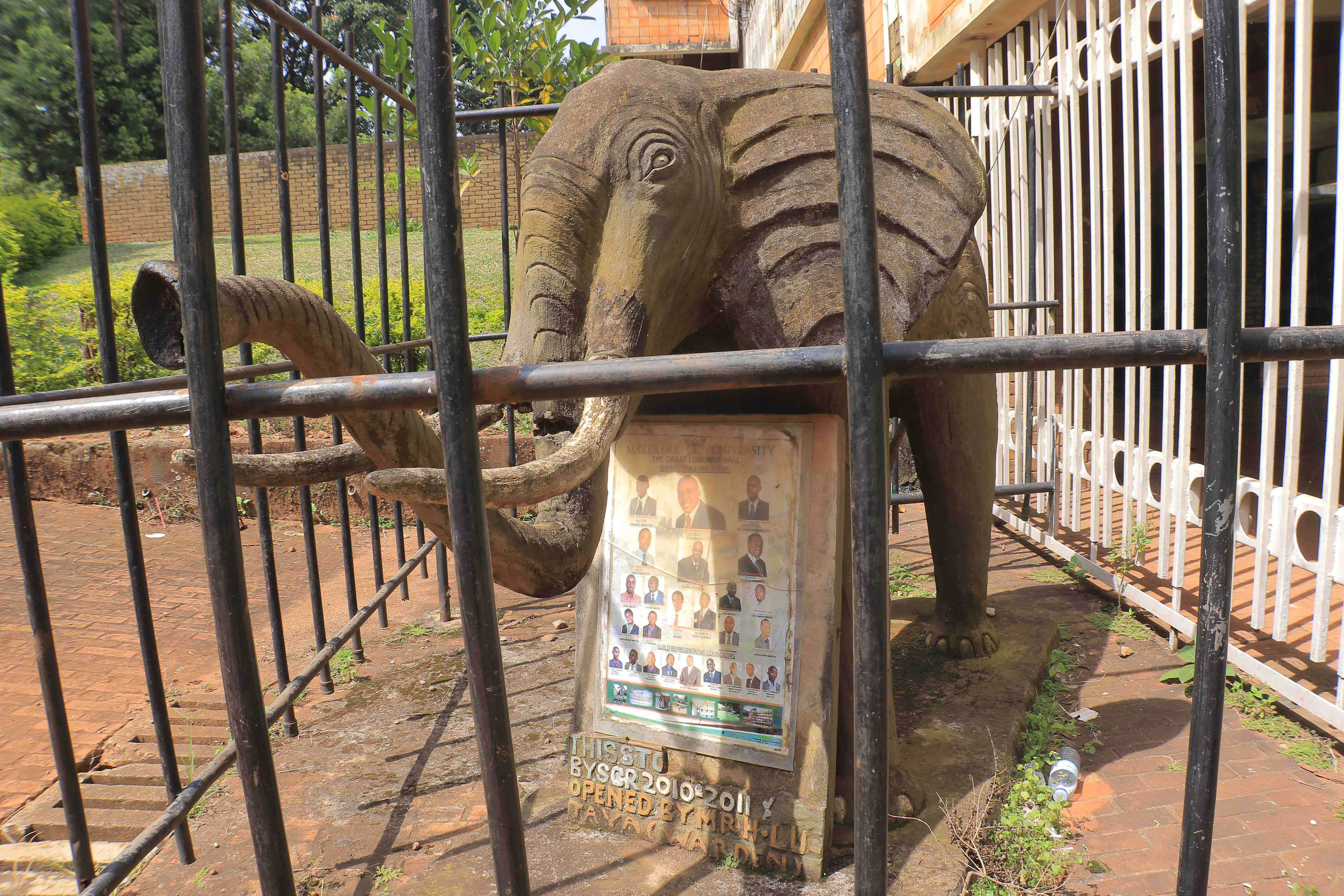
Lumumba Hall at Makerere University.jpg

For women
7. Africa Hall 8. Mary Stuart Hall and 9. CCE - Hall Complex.

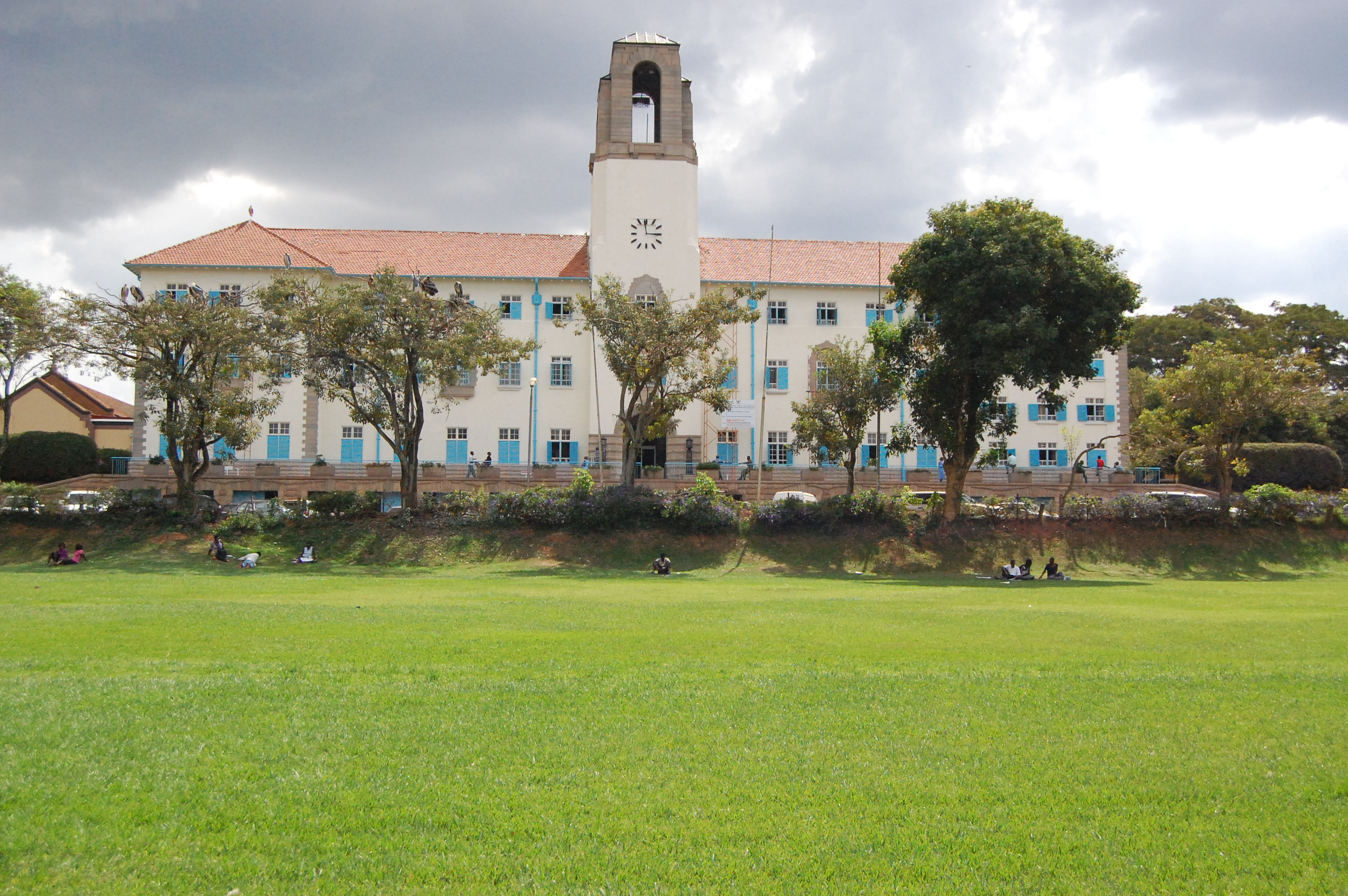
The main administration building of Makerere University

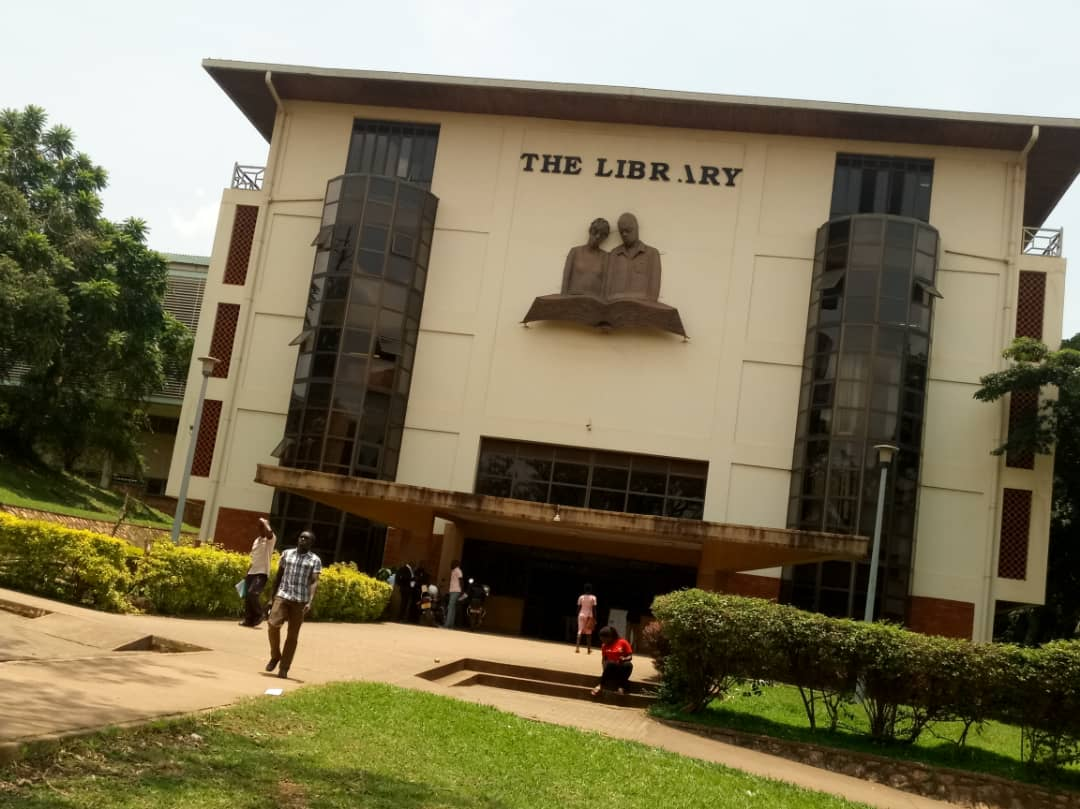
Makerere University Main Library

== Landmarks ==
These landmarks are located on Makerere Hill or near its borders:

- The main campus of Makerere University, Uganda's oldest university, founded in 1922.
- The campus of Makerere College School, a mixed, day & boarding secondary school (S1-S6), founded in 1945
- The Law Development Center, a postgraduate institution of learning that offers instruction that is required for lawyers to practice law in Uganda, established in 1970

== Other points of interest ==
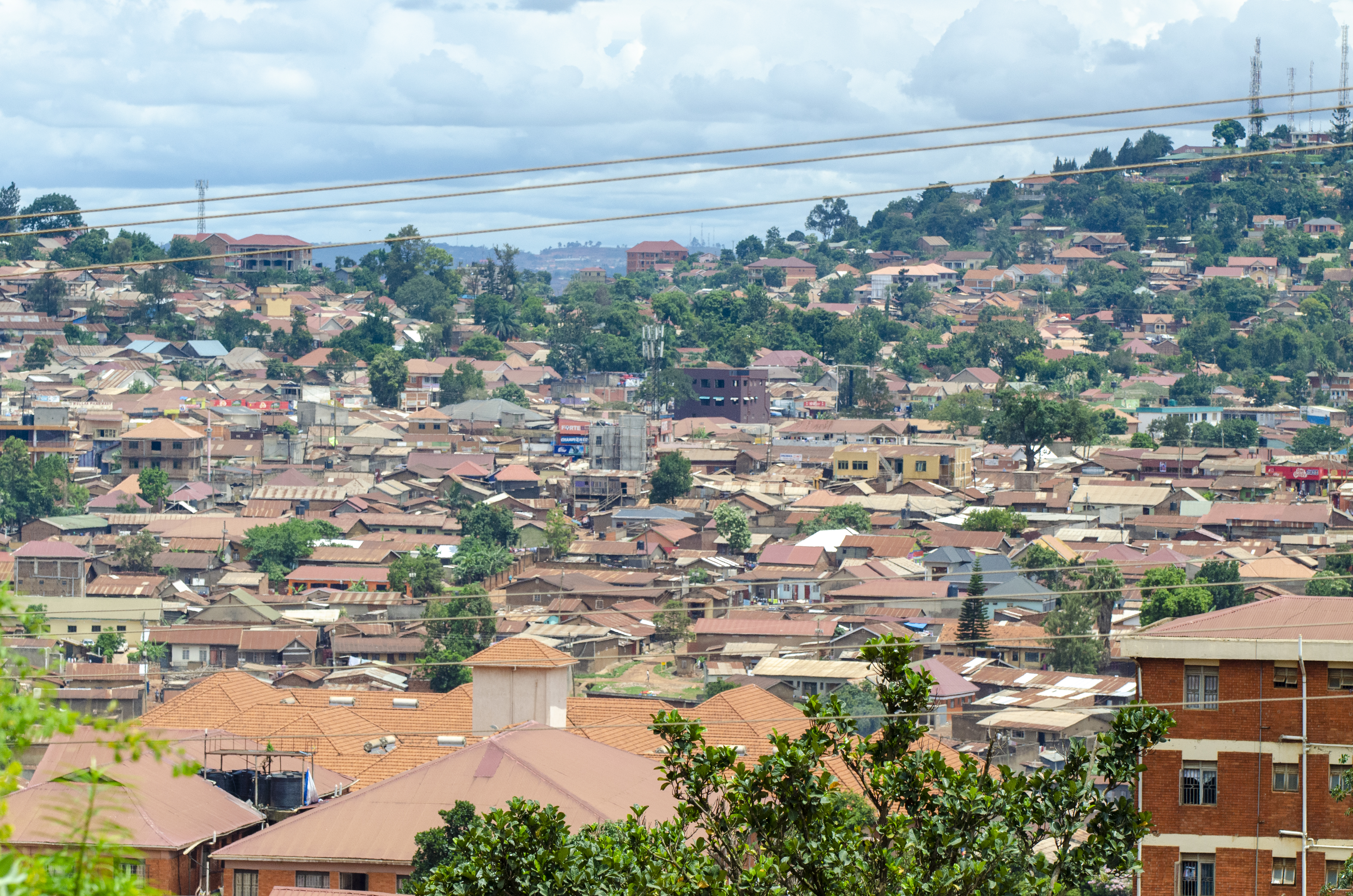
Kikoni slum

These other points of interest also lie in or near Makerere:

- Makerere Kikoni - Located to the northwest of the university campus
- Bwaise slum - Located immediately north of the university campus
- Katanga slum - Located to the east of Makerere University, between the university campus and Mulago Hill
- Kiwuunya slum - Located between Makerere University and Naakulabye

== See also ==
- Central Uganda
- Kampala Capital City Authority (KCCA)
- Kampala District
- Kawempe Division
- Makerere University
