= Naakulabye =

Neighborhood of Kampala, Uganda

Nakulabye Naankulabye
- Location in Kampala
- Coordinates: 00°19′30″N 32°33′36″E
- Country: Uganda
- Region: Central Uganda
- District: Kampala Capital City Authority
- Division: Lubaga Division
- Elevation: 3,900 ft (1,200 m)

Nakulabye, also Naankulabye, is a neighborhood within the city of Kampala, the capital and largest city in Uganda.

== Location ==
Nakulabye is located in Lubaga Division, in northwestern Kampala. It is bordered by Makerere Kikoni to the north, Makerere University Main Campus to the northeast and east, Old Kampala to the southeast, Namirembe Hill to the south, Lusaze to the west and Kasubi to the northwest. This location is approximately 1 mile (1.6 km), by road, north of Kampala's central business district. The coordinates of Nakulabye are: 0°19'30.0"N, 32°33'36.0"E (Latitude:0.3250; Longitude:32.5600).

== Overview ==
Nakulabye is a working-class neighborhood, centered on the confluence of the Kampala–Hoima Road Southbound, Kampala–Hoima Road Northbound, Makerere Hill Road and Balintuma Road. There is a busy Farmers' market, numerous shops, bars and restaurants. Near the main roads, there are decent buildings. including several high-rise student hostels. As one ventures deeper into the neighborhood, the environment degrades into one of Kampala's biggest slums. Crime is high in the area, consistent with similarly congested, low-income areas of Kampala.

== Points of interest ==
The following points of interest lie within or near Nakulabye:

- Nakulabye Central Market
- The Kampala-Hoima Highway - the highway passes through the middle of the neighborhood in a north to south direction
- A branch of Equity Bank (Uganda)
- The Kasubi tombs, in the nearby Kasubi surburb
- Nicodemus Pork Joint
- Makerere University to the east
- Exodus Christian Church - A place of worship affiliated with the Pentecostal Movement
- Total Petrol station

== See also ==
- Kasubi
- Makerere
- Namirembe
- Mengo
- Lubaga Division
- KCCA
