= Kasubi Tombs =

UNESCO World Heritage Site

Tombs of Buganda Kings at Kasubi
UNESCO World Heritage Site
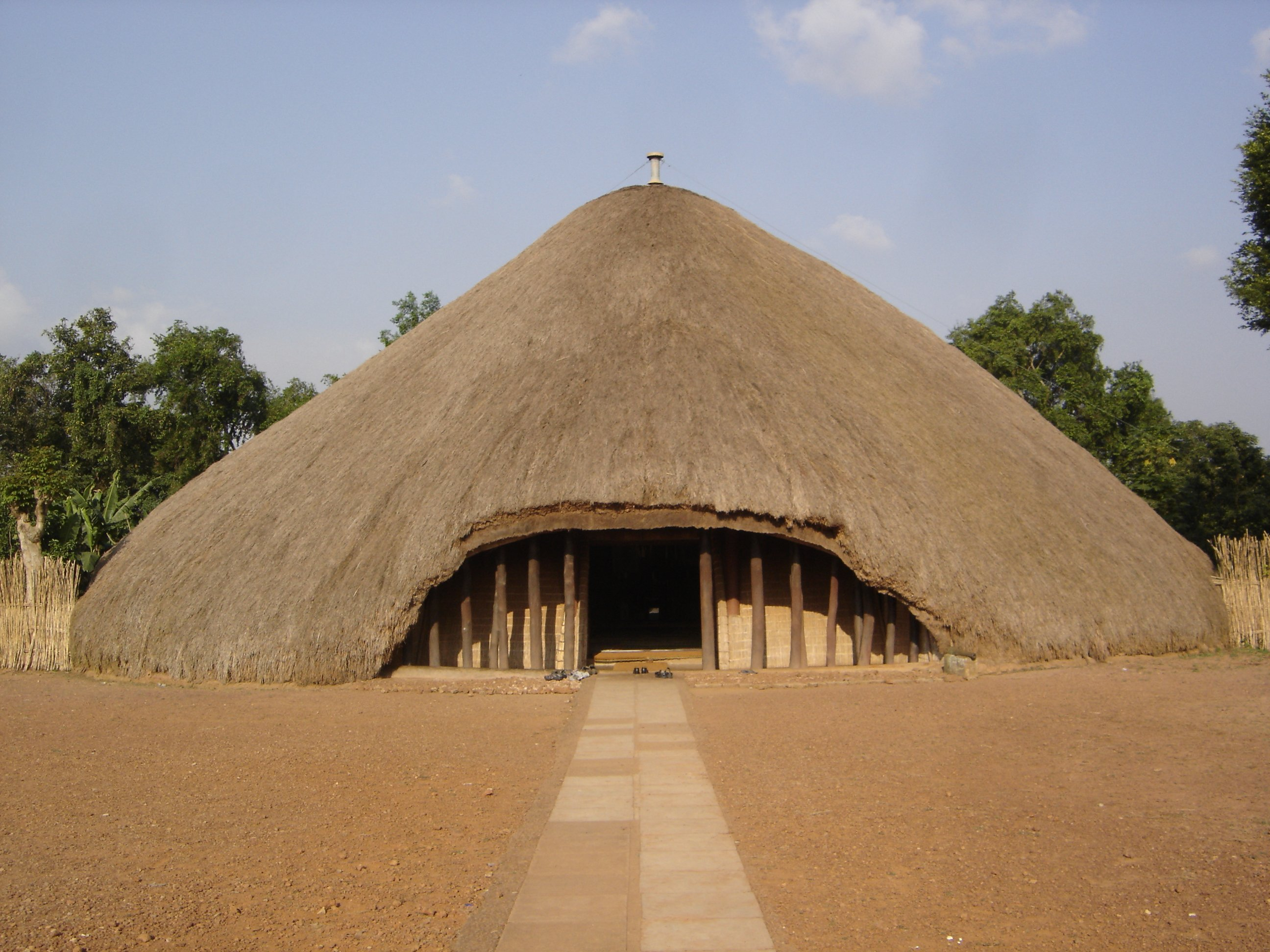
- The Kasubi Tombs in 2007

- Location within Uganda
- Location: Kampala, Uganda
- Criteria: Cultural: i, iii, iv, vi
- Reference: 1022
- Inscription: 2001 (25th Session)
- Endangered: 2010–2023
- Coordinates: 0°19′45″N 32°33′12″E

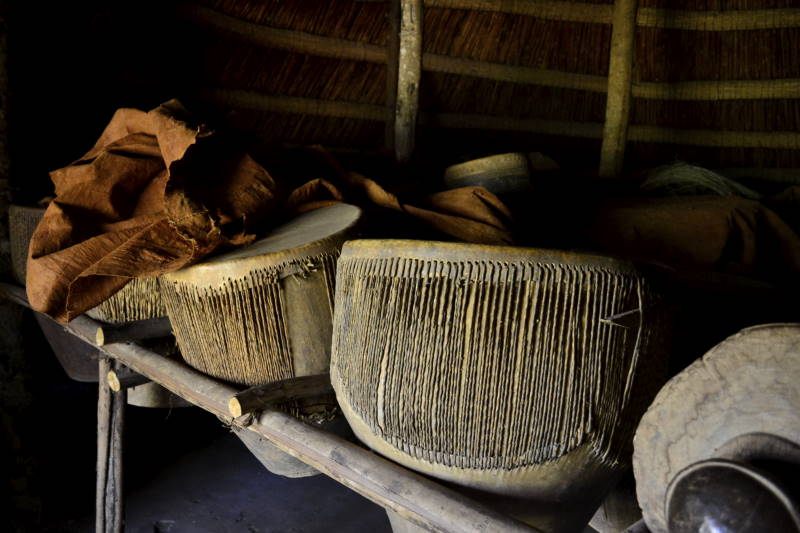
Kabaka's Gwanga Mujje Drums

The Kasubi Tombs in Kampala, Uganda, is the site of the burial grounds for four kabakas (kings of Buganda) and other members of the Baganda royal family. As a result, the site remains an important spiritual and political site for the Ganda people, as well as an important example of traditional architecture. It became a UNESCO World Heritage Site in December 2001, when it was described as "one of the most remarkable buildings using purely vegetal materials in the entire region of sub-Saharan Africa".

Some of the major buildings there were almost completely destroyed by a fire in March 2010, the cause of which is under investigation. As a result, in July 2010 it was included in the list of World Heritage Sites in Danger.

The Buganda Kingdom vowed to rebuild the tombs of their kings and President Museveni said the national government of Uganda would assist in the restoration of the site. Reconstruction started in 2014, funded by/through a fundraising/crowd-sourcing campaign called (Etofaali), loosely translated as Brick [rebuilding] and the government of Japan. After restoration of the buildings in 2023, the site was removed from the "in danger" list.

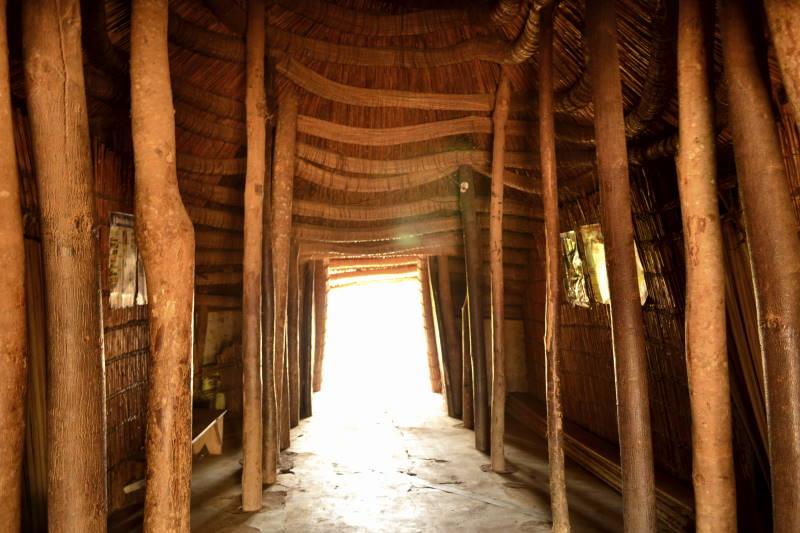
Kasubi Tombs

== Tombs ==
The World Heritage Site comprises around 26 hectares (64 acres) on the Kasubi hill in the city of Kampala, about 5 kilometres (3.1 mi) northwest of the city centre. Most of the site is open agricultural land that is farmed using traditional techniques. One corner contains a royal palace built in 1882 by Muteesa I, the 35th Kabaka of Buganda, to replace a palace built by his father, Ssuuna II in 1820. The new palace became a royal burial ground on his death in 1884. The site is one of 31 royal tombs across the Buganda kingdom since the kingdom was founded in the 13th century. Traditionally, the body of the deceased king was buried in one place, with a separate shrine for the deceased king's jawbone, believed to contain his soul. Unusually, in a break from tradition, the site in Kampala contains the royal tombs of four Kabakas of Buganda:

- Muteesa I (1835–1884)
- Mwanga II (1867–1903) (died in exile on the Seychelles Islands, and remains returned in 1910)
- Daudi Chwa II (1896–1939)
- Sir Edward Muteesa II (1924–1969) (died in exile in London, and remains returned in 1971).

Descendants of these four Kabakas are buried elsewhere on the site..

The border of the ceremonial site were established in 1882 on Kasubi Hill, also known as the Ssekabaka's Tombs. The borders are still marked with bark cloth fig trees (Ficus natalensis), which have protected it from the low-rise residential development that now surround the site on all sides. The main ceremonial area is located to the northwest of the wider site. A gatehouse (Bujjabukula) leads to a small courtyard and the drum house (Ndoga-Obukaba) which houses the royal drums, and then to a second main circular courtyard (Olugya) located on the hilltop, surrounded by a reed fence.

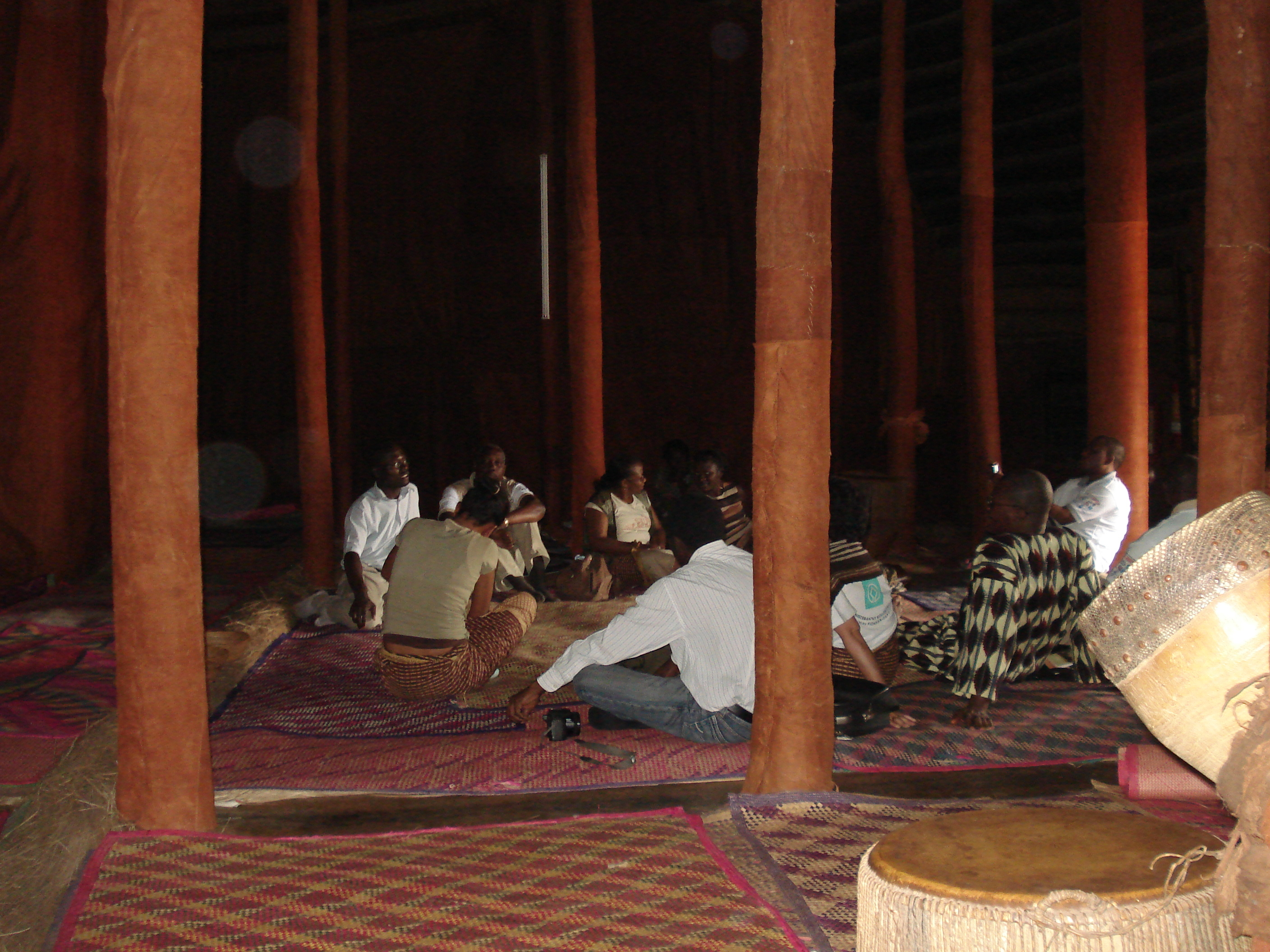
interior of Tombs of Kasubi Tombs

The main central building (Muzibu Azaala Mpanga), some 31 metres (102 ft) in circumference and 7.5 metres (25 ft) high, is located astride the border of the courtyard, on the edge opposite the entrance. Muzibu Azaala Mpanga is circular in plan with a domelike overall shape. It was originally constructed from wooden poles, reed wattle and daub, topped by a thick thatched dome, with straw resting on 52 rings of palm fronds (representing the 52 traditional clans of the Baganda people). Modern building materials were introduced in the last major renovation in 1938 by Kabaka Mutesa II of Buganda, including a steel structure, concrete columns, and bricks, largely concealed behind traditional materials. A low wide arch leads to the sacred spaces within, separated by reed partitions, with bark cloth decorations, and mementos of the kabakas. The tombs are housed in a sacred forest (Kibira) within, concealed from public view by a barkcloth curtain. The floor is covered by lemon grass and palm leaf mats.

The courtyard is also bordered by several buildings of traditional construction, including several "wives houses" for the deceased kabaka's widows, who tend the family graves. Their houses are traditionally constructed of wattle and daub with straw thatched roofs, although over time some were rebuilt with bricks and metal roofs added, and tombs for royal relations. It is also the home of members of the royal family, and royal officials including the Nalinya (spiritual guardian), her deputy the Lubuga (responsible for coordinating the farming on the site) and her administrative assistant the Katikkiro. It is also a centre for the traditional manufacture and decoration of bark cloth by the Ngo clan and for traditional thatching techniques of the Ngeye clan.

The building was maintained and managed by the Buganda Kingdom, the largest of the four ancient kingdoms of Uganda, until it was abolished by Prime Minister (then President) Milton Obote in 1966, and again after it was reinstated by President Museveni in 1993. It became a protected site under Uganda law in 1972, and the land is registered in the name of the Kabaka behalf of the Kingdom.

The site remains an important spiritual and political site for the Baganda people. In 2001, the Kasubi Tombs were declared a UNESCO World Heritage Site.

== Destruction ==
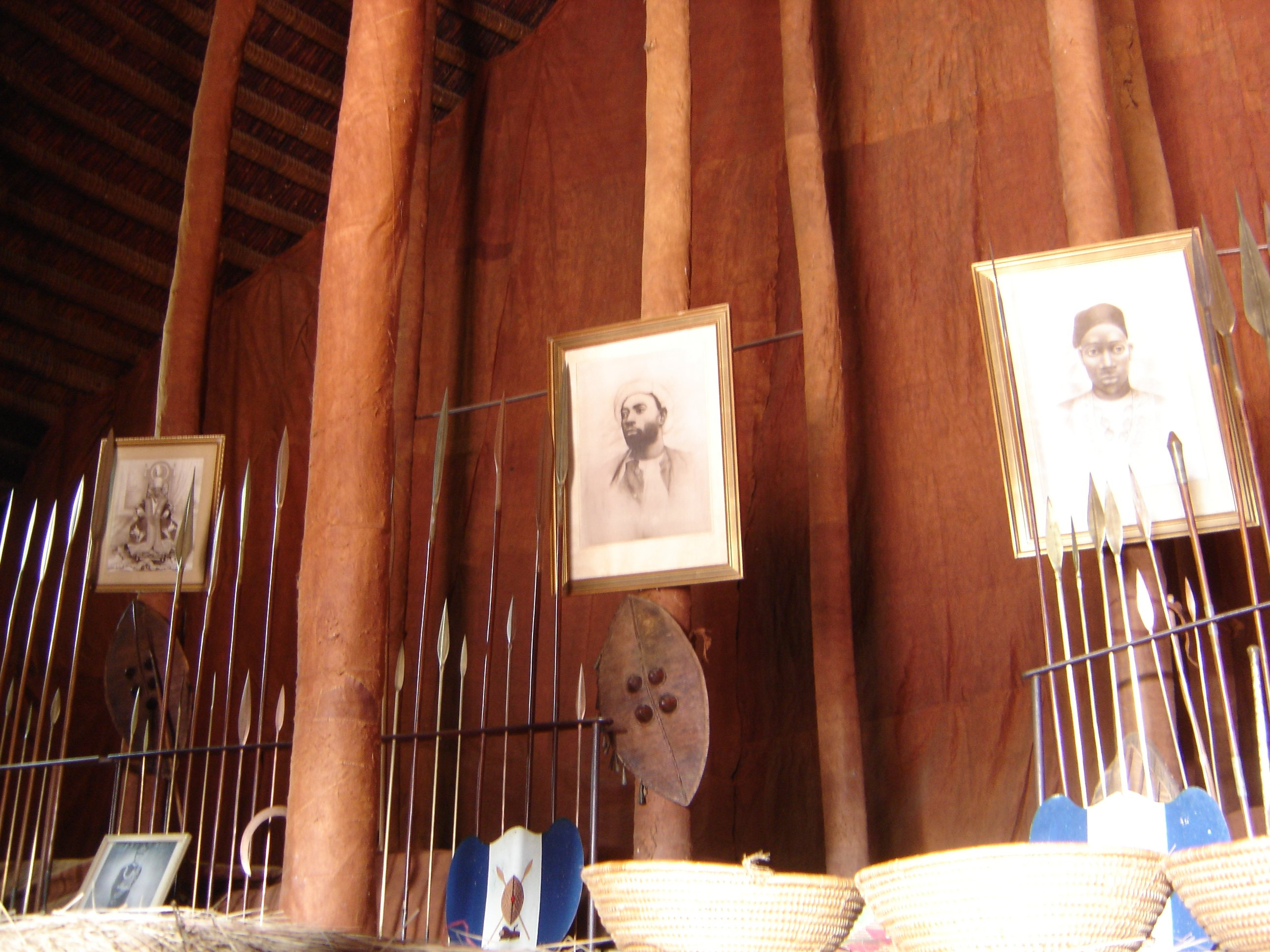
The interior of the Muzibu Azaala Mpanga in 2007, included relics and portraits of the buried kabakas

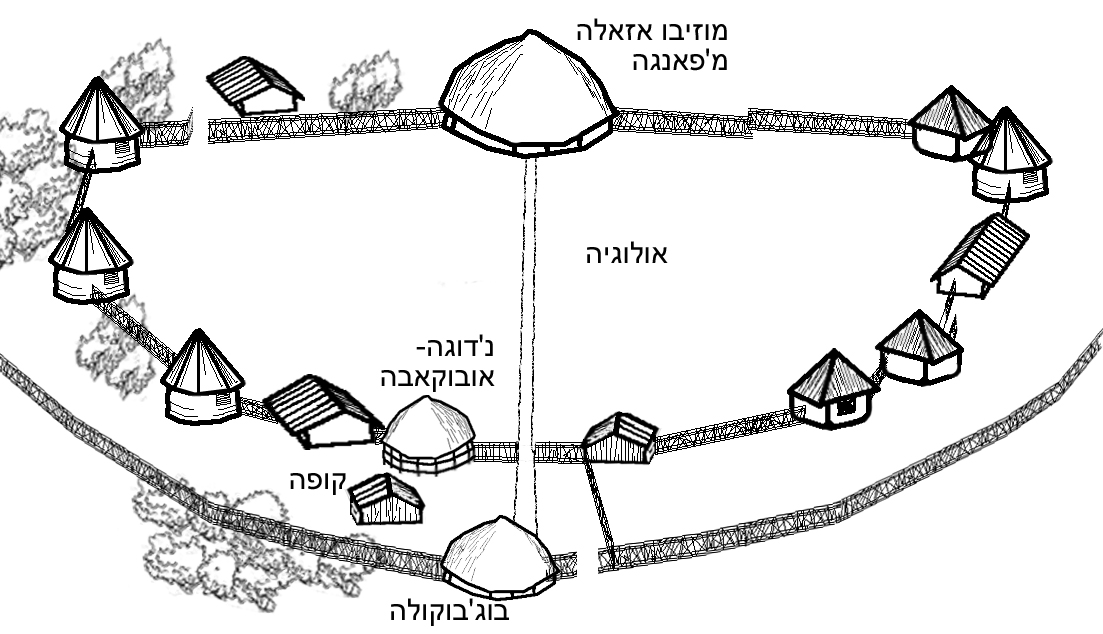
The structure containing the tombs was located at the end of a large courtyard

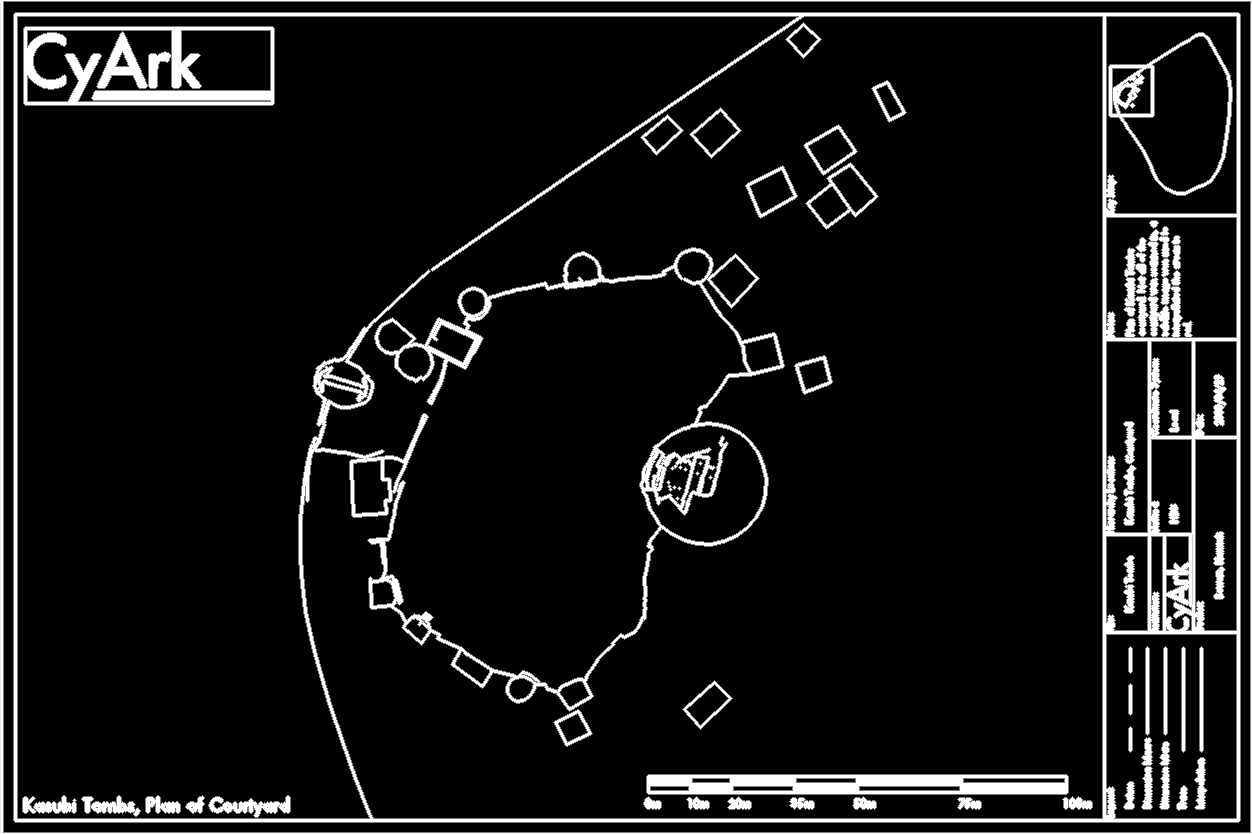
Plan view of the Oluyga Courtyard, using data from the laser scanning project in early 2009

On 16 March 2010, at about 8.30 pm local time, the Kasubi tombs were destroyed by fire. The cause of the fire is as yet unknown. The Buganda kingdom promised to conduct independent investigations into the fire, alongside the national police force.

John Baptist Walusimbi, Prime Minister of the Buganda kingdom, stated on 17 March:

The kingdom is in mourning. There are no words to describe the loss occasioned by this most callous act.

— The Guardian

The remains of the kabakas are intact, according to Walusimbi, as the inner sanctum of the tombs was protected from total destruction.

On 17 March 2010, His Majesty the Kabaka of Buganda, Ronald Muwenda Mutebi II, and the President of Uganda, Yoweri Museveni, visited the site of the tombs. Hundreds of people also travelled to the site to help salvage any remains.

Riots broke out during the President's visit. Security forces shot dead two (some reports say three) rioters and five were reportedly injured. The Ugandan soldiers and police also clashed with rioters in the capital city of Kampala. Forces used tear gas to disperse rioters of the Baganda ethnic group.

The destruction occurred in the midst of an awkward relationship between the government of Uganda and the Buganda kingdom, particularly in light of the September 2009 riots. Ahead of these riots, the king of Buganda Ronald Mutebi was stopped from touring parts of his kingdom, and several journalists who were allegedly sympathetic to the kingdom and the rioters were arrested and were awaiting trial by press time.

== Aftermath of the fire ==
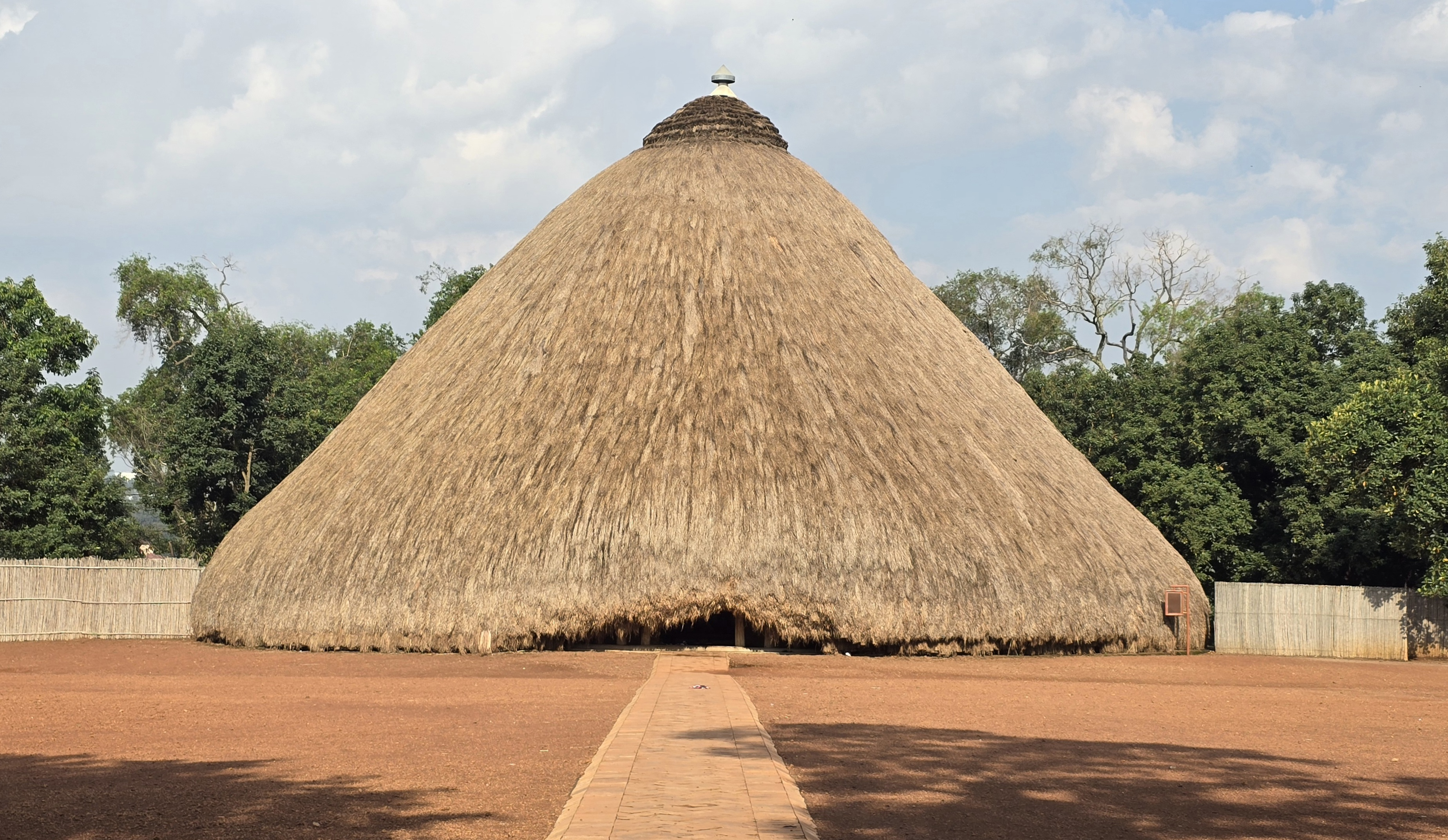
Main building after reconstrucion

The administration of the Buganda Kingdom vowed to rebuild the tombs through a fundraising/crowd-sourcing campaign called (Etofaali), loosely translated as Brick [rebuilding], and President Museveni said the national government would assist in the restoration.

A commission was set up to determine the cause of the fire and the civilian deaths in the following days. This commission handed over a report to the Ugandan government in March 2011, but as of April 2012 it had not been released to the public. As of December 2012, a plan to restore the Kasubi tombs had been launched with the help of foreign aid. The Buganda government subsequently put emphasis on security measures during the restoration to screen and restrict entry to the tombs.

In response to the incident, a mission was dispatched through the UNESCO Japanese Funds-in-Trust for the Preservation of the World Cultural Heritage to create a prevention scheme for reconstruction of the tombs. Based on the results of the mission, the Japanese government decided to provide project fund cooperation for reconstruction of the tombs, removal from the List of World Heritage in Danger, the setup of an efficient risk prevention scheme and the dispatch of experts in cultural property restoration.
