= Kyaliwajjala =

Kaliwajjala
- Location in Uganda
- Coordinates: 00°22′48″N 32°38′48″E
- Country: Uganda
- Region: Central Uganda
- District: Wakiso District
- Municipality: Kira, Uganda
- County: Kyaddondo
- Constituency: Kyaddondo East
- Elevation: 3,900 ft (1,200 m)

Population (2012 Estimate)
  - Total: 50,000

Kyaliwajjala is a neighborhood in Kira Municipality, Kyaddondo County, Wakiso District, in Central Uganda.

== Location ==
Kyaliwajja is bordered by Namugongo to the northeast, Bweyogerere to the southeast, Naalya to the south, Najjera to the west and Downtown Kira to the northwest. This location lies approximately 14 kilometres (8.7 mi), by road, northeast of Kampala, the capital of Uganda and the largest city in the country. The coordinates of Kyaliwajjala are:0°22'48.0"N 32°38'47.0"E (Latitude:0.380000; Longitude:32.646389).

== Overview ==
In the 1960s and 1980s, Kyaliwajjala was a trading center at a road intersection. During the 21st Century it has developed into a bustling urban center with banks, retail shops, gasoline stations, pharmacies and hardware stores. The Kampala Northern Bypass Highway passes through Naalya, to the south of the neighborhood.

== Population ==
During the 2002 national population census, the population of Kyaliwajjala was estimated at 16,200 or 11.5% of the total population of Kira. In 2011, the population of Kira Municipality was estimated at 179,800, by the Uganda Bureau of Statistics (UBOS). Using those data, the population of Kyaliwajjala was estimated at 21,000 inhabitants, in 2011. During 2012, the Kira Municipality authorities estimated Kyaliwajjala's population at about 50,000.

== Points of interest ==
These are some of the points of interest in or near Kyaliwajjala:

- The Namugongo Road - Leads to the Uganda Martyr's Basilica at Namugongo
- The Kampala Northern Bypass Highway - The highway goes through Naalya, about 2.5 kilometres (1.6 mi), south of Kyaliwajjala
- Naalya Housing Estate - A high-rise condominium and apartment complex constructed by National Housing and Construction Company
- Vienna College - A private, mixed, residential high school (S1 - S4)
- The Uganda Martyrs Basilica Namugongo - The basilica lies about 2 kilometres (1.2 mi), northeast of Kyaliwajjala.
- Quality Shopping Mall - A shopping complex anchored by Quality Supermarket
- A branch of DFCU Bank, located at Quality Shopping Mall
- A branch of Guaranty Trust Bank Uganda - Located on Namugongo Road

== Photos and diagrams ==
- Photograph of Kyaliwajjala In 2013, at Monitor.co.ug

== See also ==
- Kira Town
- Central Uganda
- Wakiso District
- Northern Bypass
- Uganda Martyrs
