= Joan Kagezi =

Uandan lawyer (1967–2015)

- Born: Joan Namazzi; 14 July 1967; Luteete, Rakai District, Uganda
- Died: 30 March 2015 (aged 47); Kiwaatule, Kampala, Uganda
- Cause of death: Assassination by gunshots
- Education: Makerere University (bachelor of laws); Law Development Centre (diploma in legal practice); Eastern and Southern African Management Institute (died before graduation)
- Occupation: Lawyer
- Years active: 1992–2015
- Title: Deputy Director of Public Prosecution; Uganda Ministry of Justice
- Spouse: Henry Morton Kagezi
- Children: 4

Joan Namazzi Kagezi (née Namazzi; 14 July 1967 – 30 March 2015), was a Ugandan lawyer and prosecutor. She was assassinated on 30 March 2015 in Kiwaatule, a Kampala suburb, on her way home. At the time of her death, she was the assistant director of public prosecution and head of the International Criminal Division in Uganda's Ministry of Justice and Constitutional Affairs.

== Background and education ==
She was born Joan Namazzi to Kaggwa Sserwadda and Mrs. Sserwadda of Luteete Village, Rakai District, on 14 July 1967. She attended Nsuube Primary School from 1973 to 1980. She studied at Mount Saint Mary's College Namagunga, an all-girls boarding senior secondary school in Mukono District, for both her O-Level and A-Level education. In 1987, she entered Makerere University to study law, graduating in 1990 with a Bachelor of Laws degree. In 1992, she earned a Diploma in Legal Practice from the Law Development Centre. At the time of her death, she was pursuing a Master of Business Administration from the Eastern and Southern African Management Institute.

== Career ==
Throughout her 23-year career as an attorney, Kagezi served as a public servant with the government of Uganda. Straight out of the Law Development Centre in 1992, she secured a position as land officer in the Ministry of Lands, Housing and Urban Development. In May 1994, she was appointed a state attorney in the Ministry of Justice and Constitutional Affairs. She received a promotion in February 2002 to principal state attorney. In August 2007, she was promoted to senior principal state attorney. In January 2015, she was appointed head of the International Crimes Division, at the rank of assistant director of public prosecutions.

== Death ==
On 30 March 2015, at about 7.30 pm local time, Kagezi, who was driving an official white Ford ranger double-cabin pick up with government number plates UG.0586J, which she was in without security, stopped at a road-side stand to buy fresh vegetables in the Kampala suburb of Kiwaatule. Her intended final destination was her home in the adjacent neighbourhood called Najjera. In the pick-up with her were three of her four children, two girls and one boy. One of the girls left the vehicle to pick up the products while the rest of the family stayed in the vehicle. While the girl was walking back to the car, a man approached the truck. He knocked on the driver's window which was closed, appearing to be making an inquiry. When Kagezi opened the window, the man shot her twice in the neck at close range, jumped on the back of a waiting motor cycle (boda boda), and sped off. She was rushed to Mulago National Referral Hospital, where she was pronounced dead on arrival at about 8.00 pm. She was 47 years old.

== Case load ==
Among the high-profile prosecutions that Joan Kagezi participated in or led, over her 21 years as a government prosecutor were the following:

- The prosecution of Ugandan-born Australian cardiologist Aggrey Kiyingi for the assassination of his wife, lawyer Robinah Kasirye Kiyingi. She was gunned down in July 2005 outside the gate of the family mansion in Buziga, an upscale neighbourhood in Uganda's capital Kampala. The state lost that case.
- The trial and conviction of former Arua Municipality, Akbar Hussein Godi, whose wife was killed on 4 December 2008 in Mukono District. In February 2011, Godi was sentenced to 25 years in prison after being convicted of murdering Rehema Caesar Godi, who was 19 years old at the time of her death.
- The prosecution and conviction of Kampala businessman Thomas Nkulungira, also known as "Tonku", whose girlfriend was killed sometime between 21 and 30 December 2010. Her body was dumped in the septic tank at Nkulungira's house in Muyenga, a Kampala neighbourhood. On 13 August 2011, a judge sentenced Tonku to death for capital murder.
- The prosecution of Thomas Kwoyelo, a warlord in the Lord's Resistance Army, on charges of kidnapping, murder, rape, and human mutilation and torture. The trial was terminated when Uganda's Constitutional Court granted Kwoyelo amnesty. On appeal, however, the Supreme Court of Uganda reversed that decision on 8 April 2015, sending the case back to the Uganda High Court for trial.
- The prosecution that was ongoing when Kagezi died of 13 individuals accused of participating in the July 2010 Kampala attacks, which occurred during the 2010 FIFA World Cup Final match, killing at least 79 people.

== Family ==
While an undergraduate at Makerere University in the late 1980s, she met her future husband, Henry Morton Kagezi. He died of natural causes in 2006. Together, they had two boys and two girls: George Phillip Kagezi born in 1993, Carol Milcah Kagezi born in 1994, Pearl Priscilla Kagezi born in 1999, and John Harvey Kagezi born in 2004. President Yoweri Museveni has pledged to pay the children's school fees until each child determines that he or she decides to end his or her education.

== Search for her killers ==
On 8 April 2015, a heavily armed force of Ugandan and U.S. security officials apprehended Jamal Abdullah Kiyemba, an individual formerly held in Guantanamo. While there was no conclusive evidence tying Kiyemba to the killing of Kagezi, detectives were questioning him about his possible role in that crime and a range of other offences.

== See also ==
- Kale Kayihura
- Kahinda Otafiire
- Aronda Nyakairima
- Jim Muhwezi
