= Naalya =

- Location in Uganda
- Coordinates: 00°22′12″N 32°38′24″E
- Country: Uganda
- Region: Central Uganda
- District: Wakiso District
- Municipality: Kira, Uganda
- County: Kyaddondo
- Constituency: Kyaddondo East
- Elevation: 3,900 ft (1,200 m)

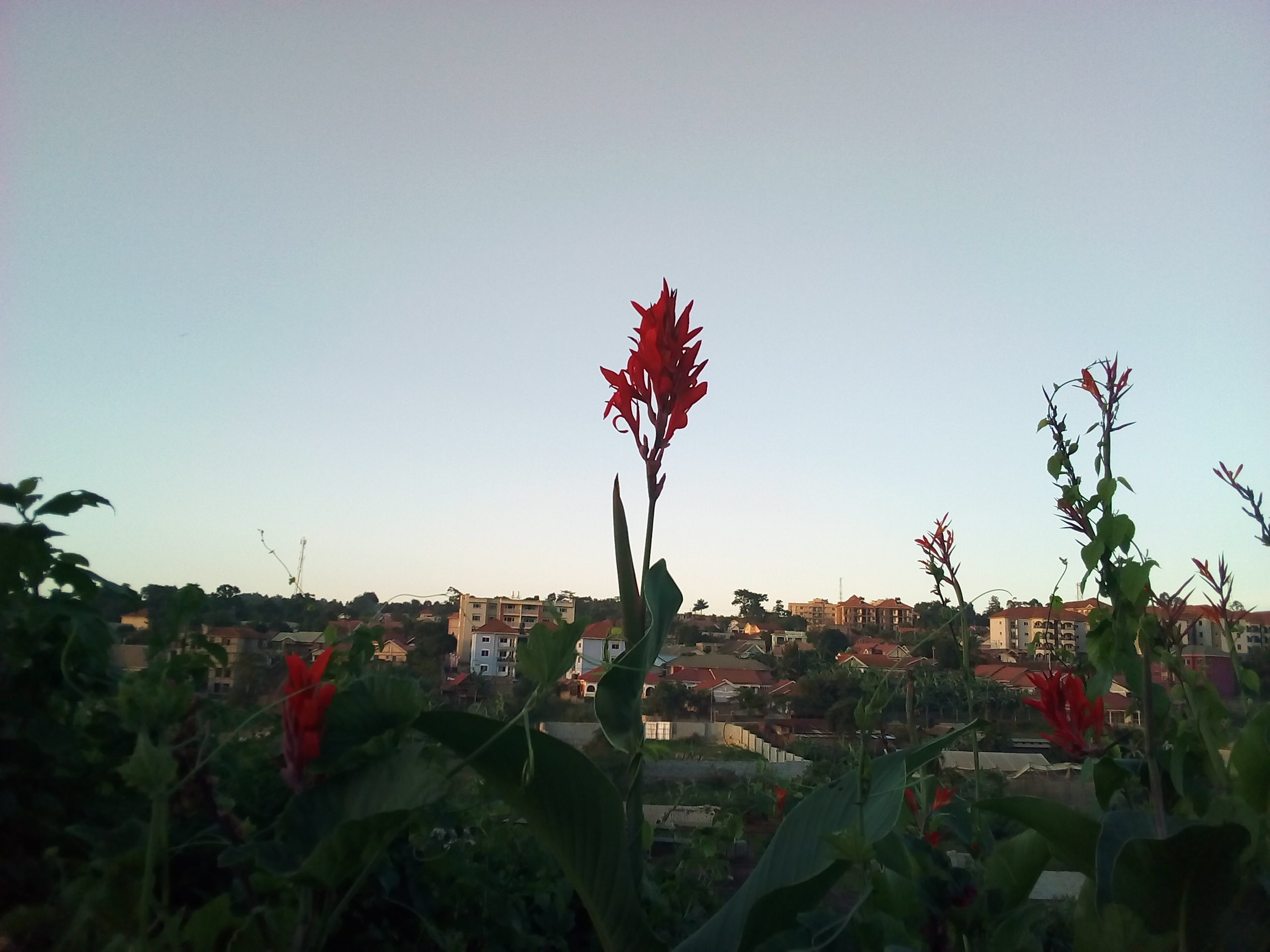
Naalya Apartments in Kampala Uganda

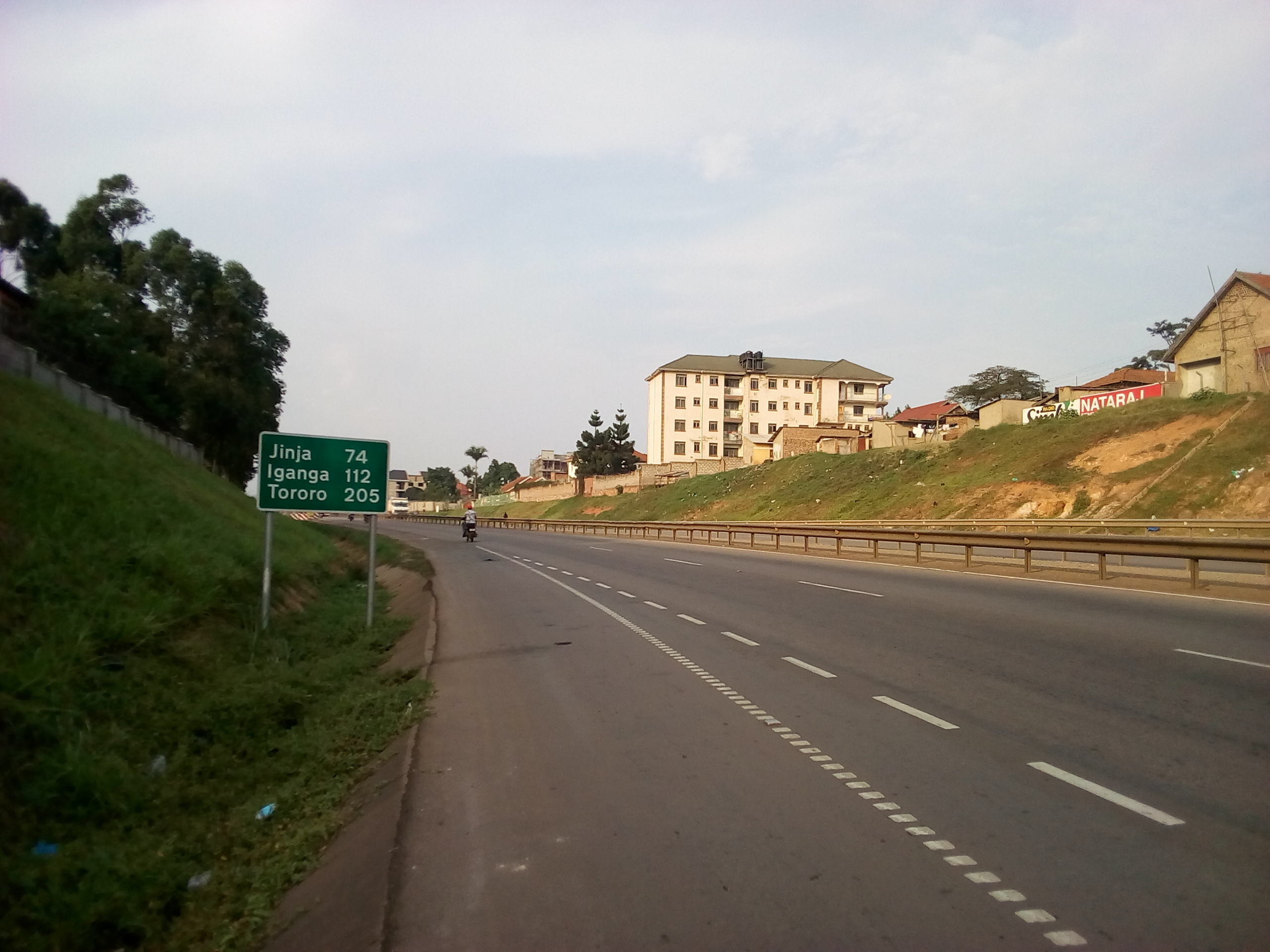
Kampala Northern Bypass Highway Cross section in Naalya overlooking the Round About

Naalya is a township in Kira Municipality, in Kyaddondo County, Wakiso District, in Uganda.

== Location ==
Naalya is bordered by downtown Kira to the north, Kyaliwajjala and Namugongo to the northeast, Bweyogerere to the east, Kireka to the southeast, Banda to the south and Kiwaatule to the west and Najjera to the northwest. Naalya is located approximately 12.5 kilometres (7.8 mi), by road, northeast of Kampala's central business district From Kampala, one can either follow the Kampala-Jinja Highway eastwards for 10.5 kilometres (6.5 mi) to Kireka, turn north and travel another 2 kilometres (1.2 mi) to Naalya. Alternatively, one can follow the Kampala Northern Bypass Highway, proceeding eastwards through Bukoto, Kiwaatule until one arrives at Naalya.

== Overview ==
In the 21st century, Naalya is developing into a middle class residential neighborhood with high-rise apartment complexes and modest residential bungalows. The Kampala Northern Bypass Highway traverses the township as it courses its way from Bweyogerere to the east towards Kiwaatule, to the west of Naalya. In between the residences and highways, supermarkets and shopping malls are beginning to spring up. The Metroplex Shopping Mall, the largest shopping complex in Uganda, is located in Naalya, on the northern border of the Kampala Northern Bypass Highway.

Naalya aims to establish itself as Kampala's leading destination for experiential living.

== Points of interest ==
These are some of the points of interest in or near Naalya:

- The Kireka-Namugongo Road - Leads to the Uganda Martyr's Basilica at Namugongo
- The Kampala Northern Bypass Highway - The highway goes through the township
- Naalya Housing Estate - A high-rise condominium and apartment complex constructed by National Housing and Construction Company
- Naalya Secondary School - A private, mixed, non-residential high school (grades 8 - 13)
- Bethany High School - A private, upscale, mixed, day and boarding high school (grades 8 -13)
- Harvest International School - A private, day, Christian, International School

== See also ==
- Central Region, Uganda
