= Kamwookya =

- Map of Kampala showing the location of Kamwookya.
- Coordinates: 00°20′33″N 32°35′20″E
- Country: Uganda
- Region: Central Uganda
- District: Kampala Capital City Authority
- Division: Kampala Central Division
- Elevation: 1,200 m (3,900 ft)
- Time zone: UTC+3 (EAT)

Kamwookya, sometimes spelled as Kamwokya, is a location within the city of Kampala, Uganda's capital and largest metropolitan area.

== Location ==
Kamwookya is bordered by Kyebando to the north, Bukoto to the northeast, Naguru to the east, Kololo to the southeast, Nakasero to the south and Mulago to the west. This location is approximately 5 kilometres (3.1 mi), by road, northeast of the Kampala's central business district. The coordinates of Kamwookya are:0°20'33.0"N, 32°35'20.0"E (Latitude:0.342500; Longitude:32.588889).

== Overview ==
Kamwookya is a mixed residential and commercial area of the city, with a large number of small Information Technology (IT) businesses. Kamwookya is also the location of a central market, restaurants, shops, dry-cleaners and sports bars, many of them, upscale. Closer to the city center, one can find several foreign embassies, government buildings and an upscale shopping mall. (See Points of interest below:).

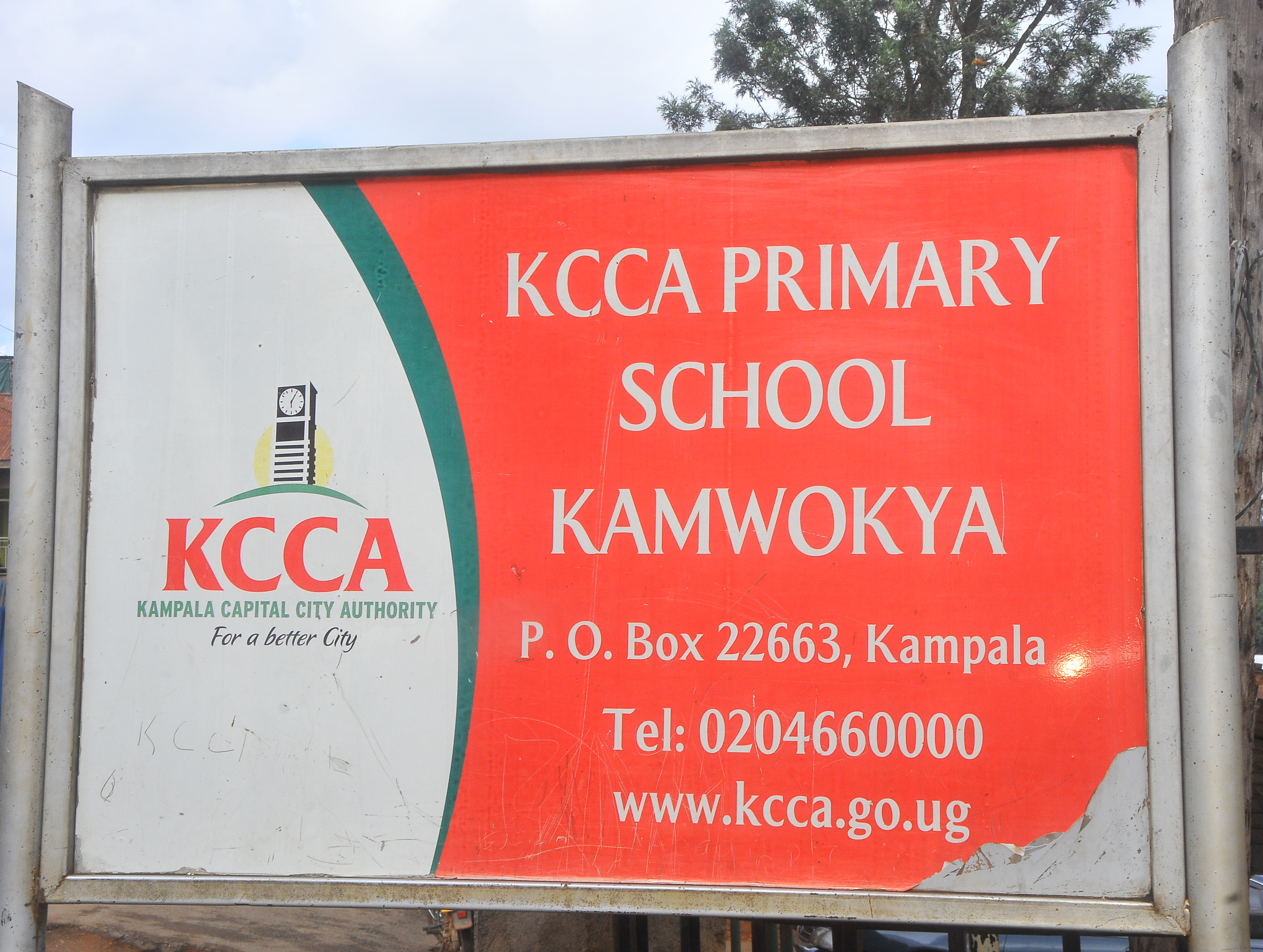
KCCA PS Kamwokya.jpg

In the northern portion of Kamwookya, between the Kampala Northern Bypass Highway and Kira Road, the neighborhood is a densely packed slum, with poorly constructed housing units, poor drainage and rudimentary sanitary infrastructure, with attendant public health challenges.

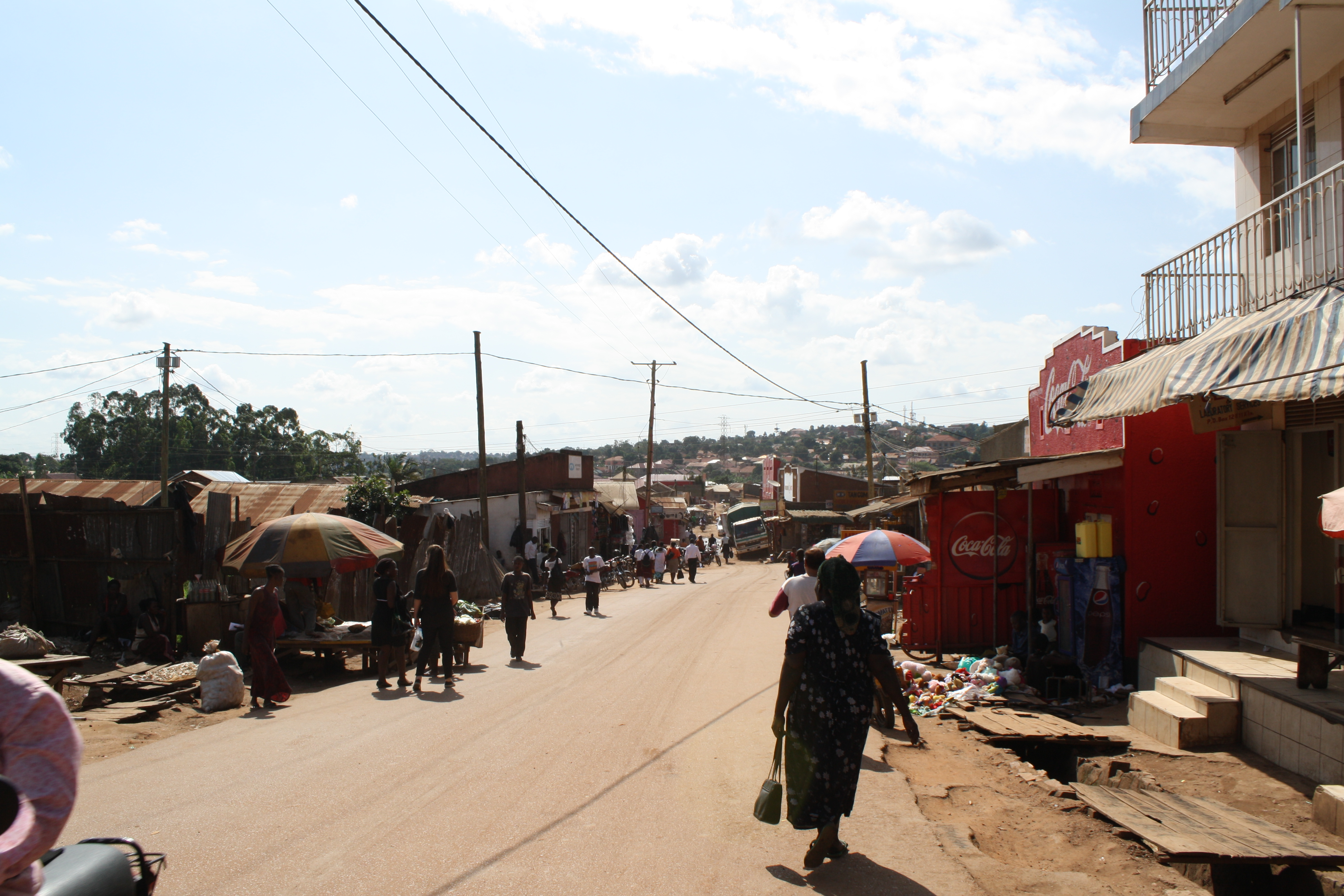
Main road.

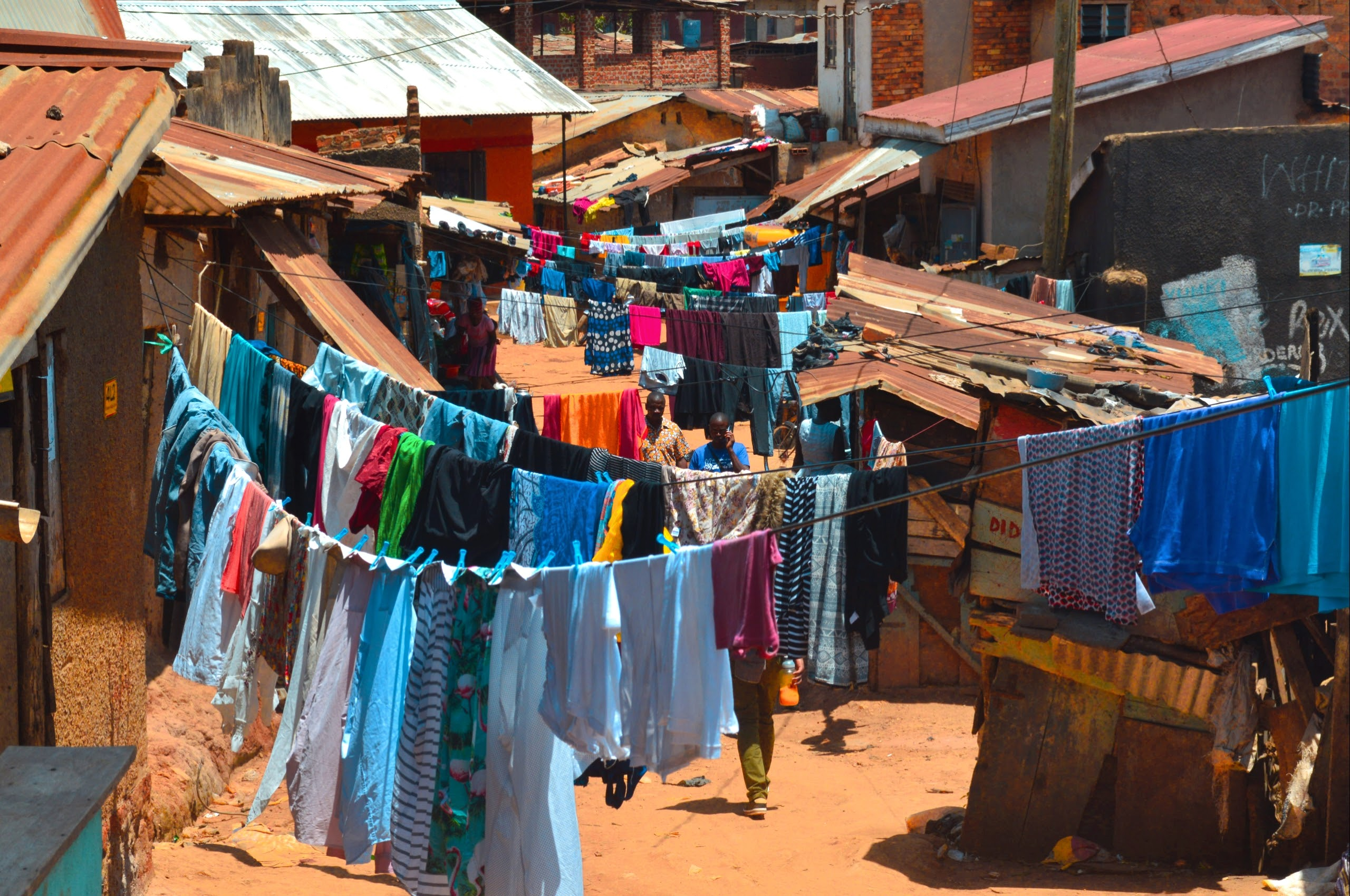
General cleaning.

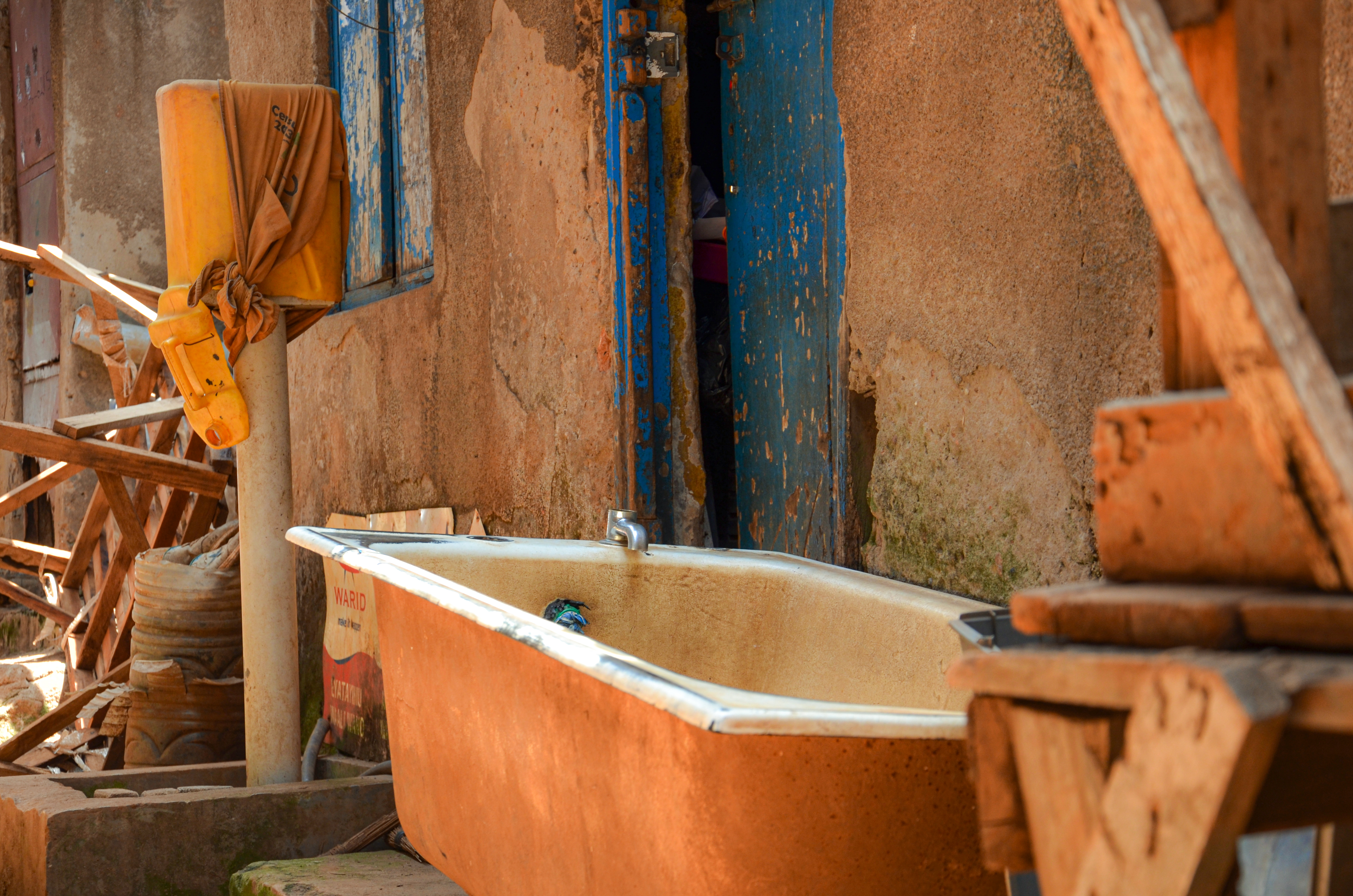
Bath tab outside the house.

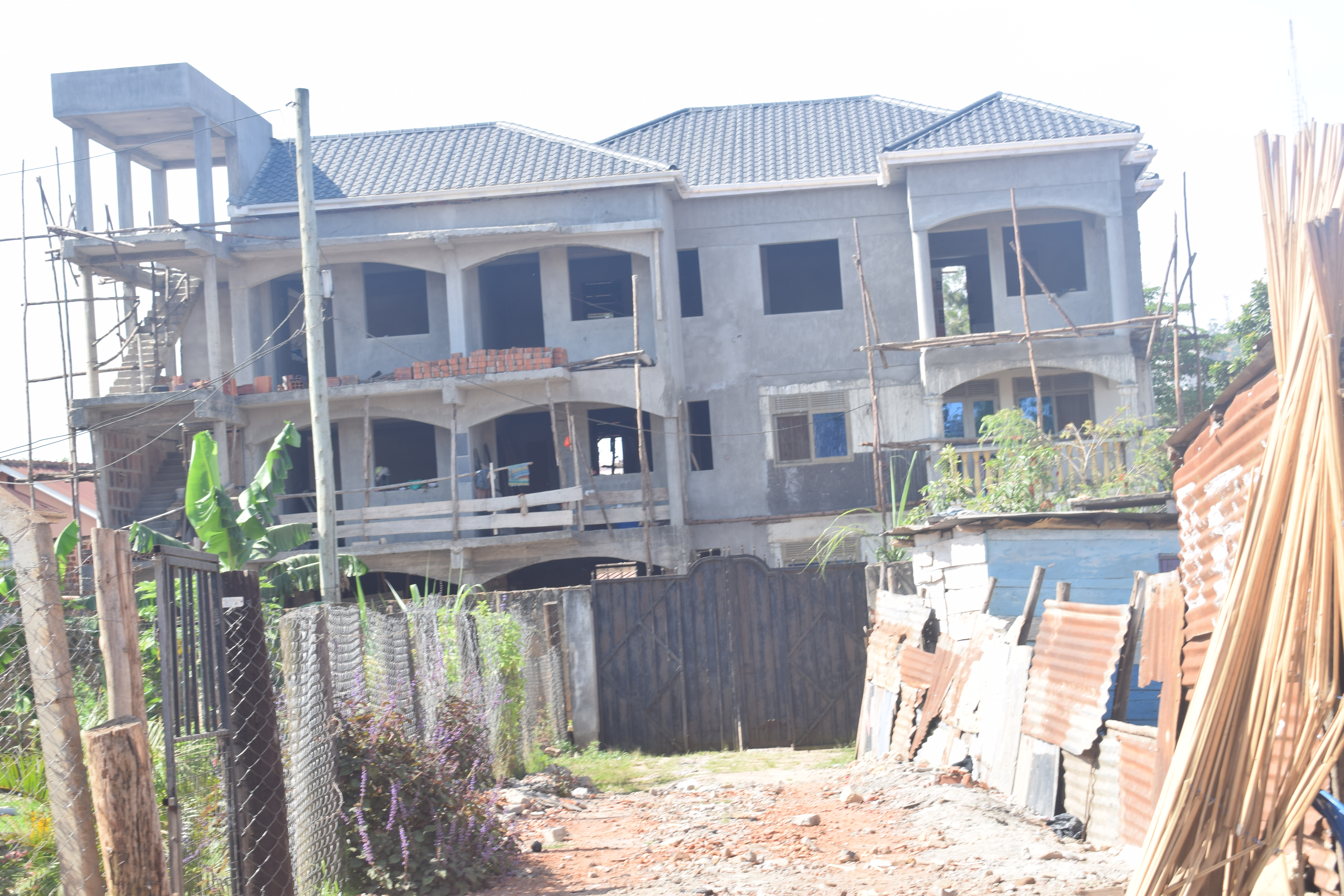
Unfinished building.

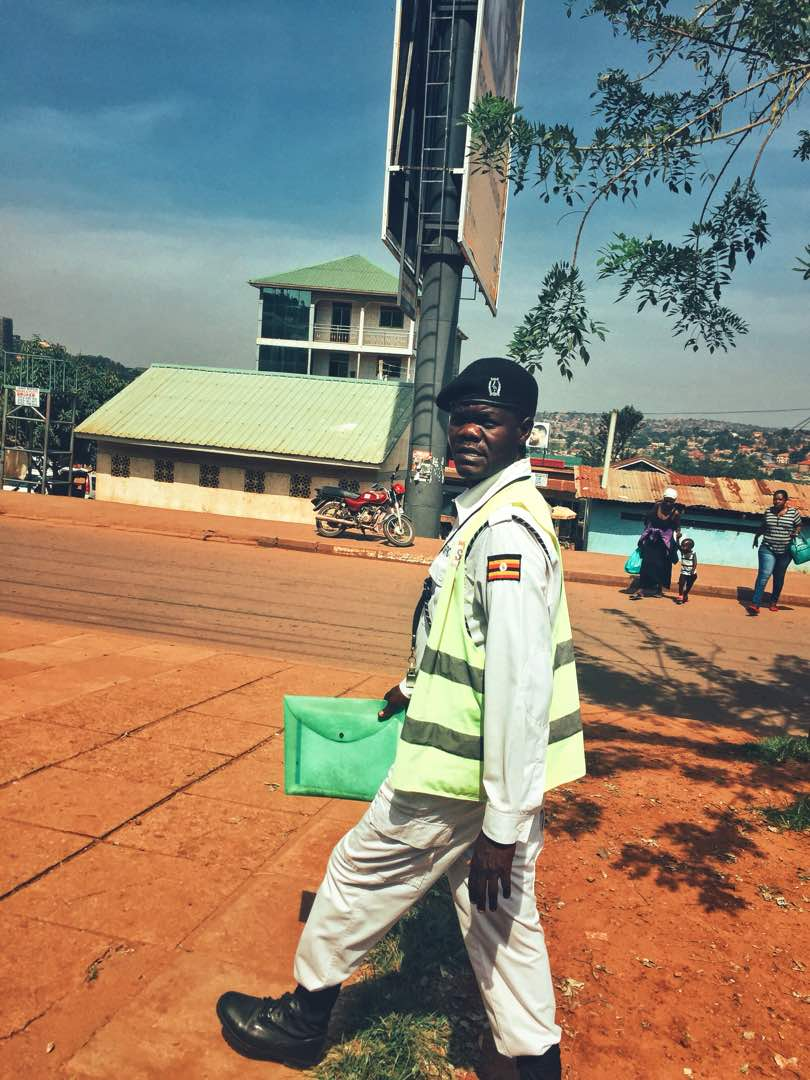
Traffic policeman.

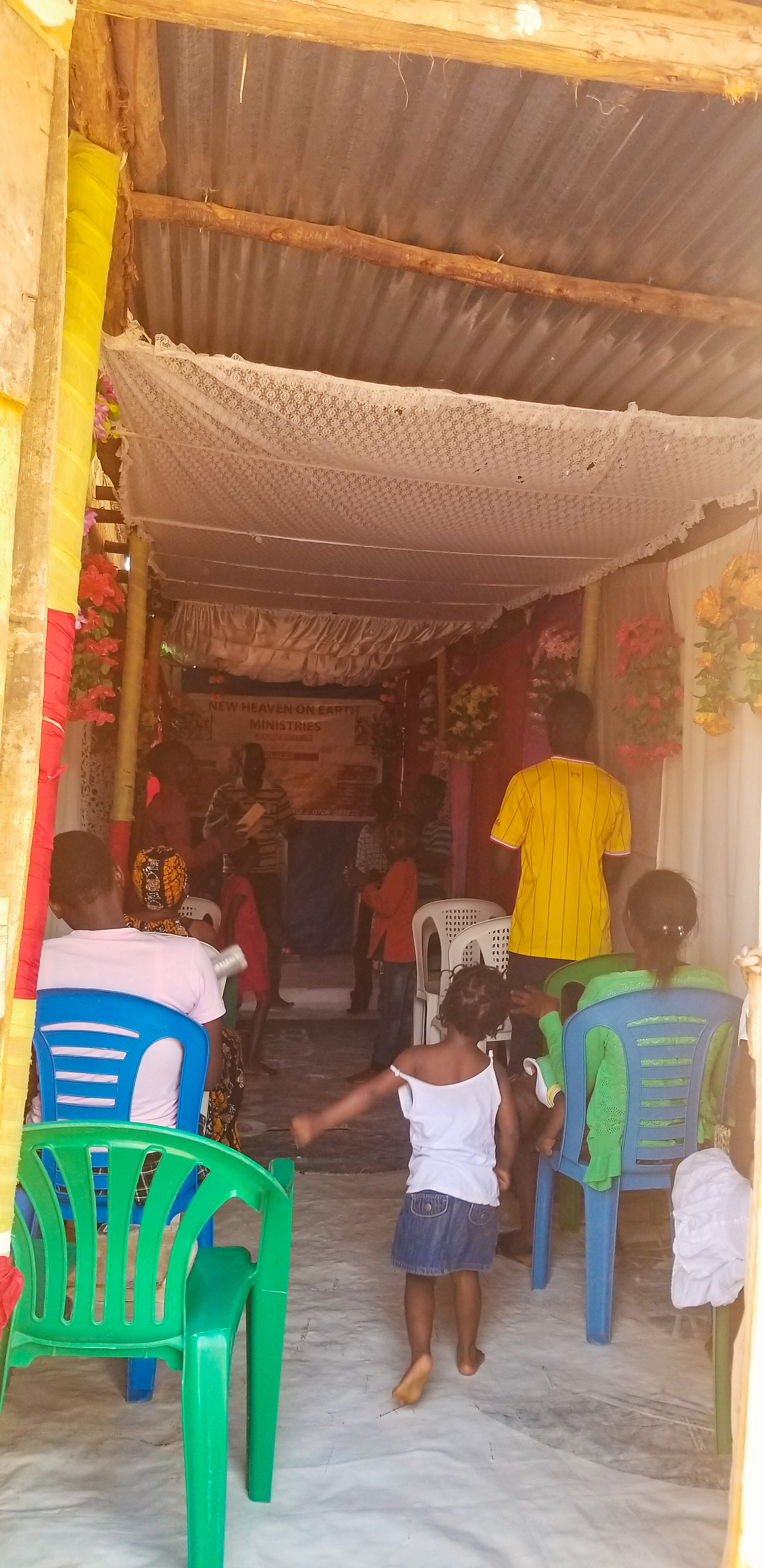
A church.

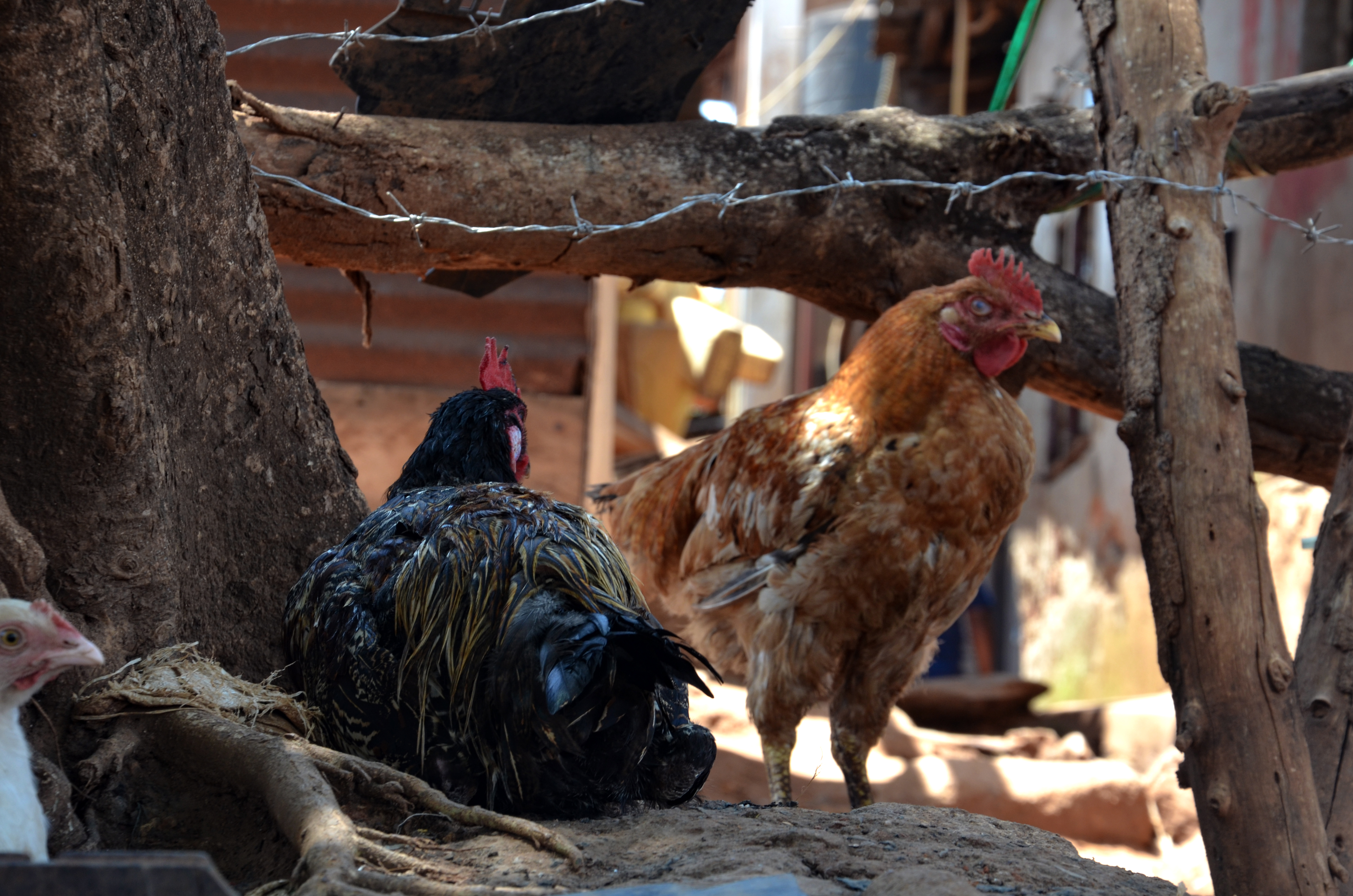
Poultry.

== Notable people ==
Robert Kyagulanyi Ssentamu, known as Bobi Wine, Ugandan musician, activist, actor and politician.

== Points of interest ==
The points of interest in or near Kamwookya include:

- NBS Television Ltd
- Iwat Solutions. One of the few recognized Ugandan based live stream service providers
- British High Commission
- High Commission of the Republic of Rwanda
- Uganda National Museum
- Uganda Wildlife Authority Headquarters
- Acacia Mall - technically Kamwokya lies on Kololo Hill. Acacia Mall, an upscale, six-storey, air-conditioned shopping center at the corner of Kira Road and Acacia Avenue, where Kamwokya meets Kololo proper.
- Katego Family Planning Clinic - a private medical facility
- S&J Strategies Limited - a communications consulting firm
- Kampala Northern Bypass Highway - the highway passes through the northern reaches of Kamwookya.
- Saint Francis Students Community Center - a public community center for area and visiting students
- Makerere Guest House - a private lodging facility. (Not to be confused with Makerere University Guest House, which is located on the main campus of Makerere University).
- Kampala City View Guest House - a private lodging facility, at the corner of Kira Road and Tufnell Drive.
- A branch of Guaranty Trust Bank (Uganda) - one of the commercial banks in the country
- A branch of Imperial Bank Uganda - in the Acacia Mall
- A branch of Orient Bank - in the Acacia Mall
- Daks Couriers Limited – the leading privately owned courier, transport and logistics company in the country.

== See also ==
- Kampala
- Naguru
- Kololo
- Bukoto
- Mulago
