= National Housing Corporation =

National Housing Corporation may refer to:

- National Housing Corporation (Barbados), maintaining Crown land
- National Housing Corporation (Tanzania), a Federal institution of Tanzania
- National Housing and Construction Company, Uganda
