= Kiwaatule =

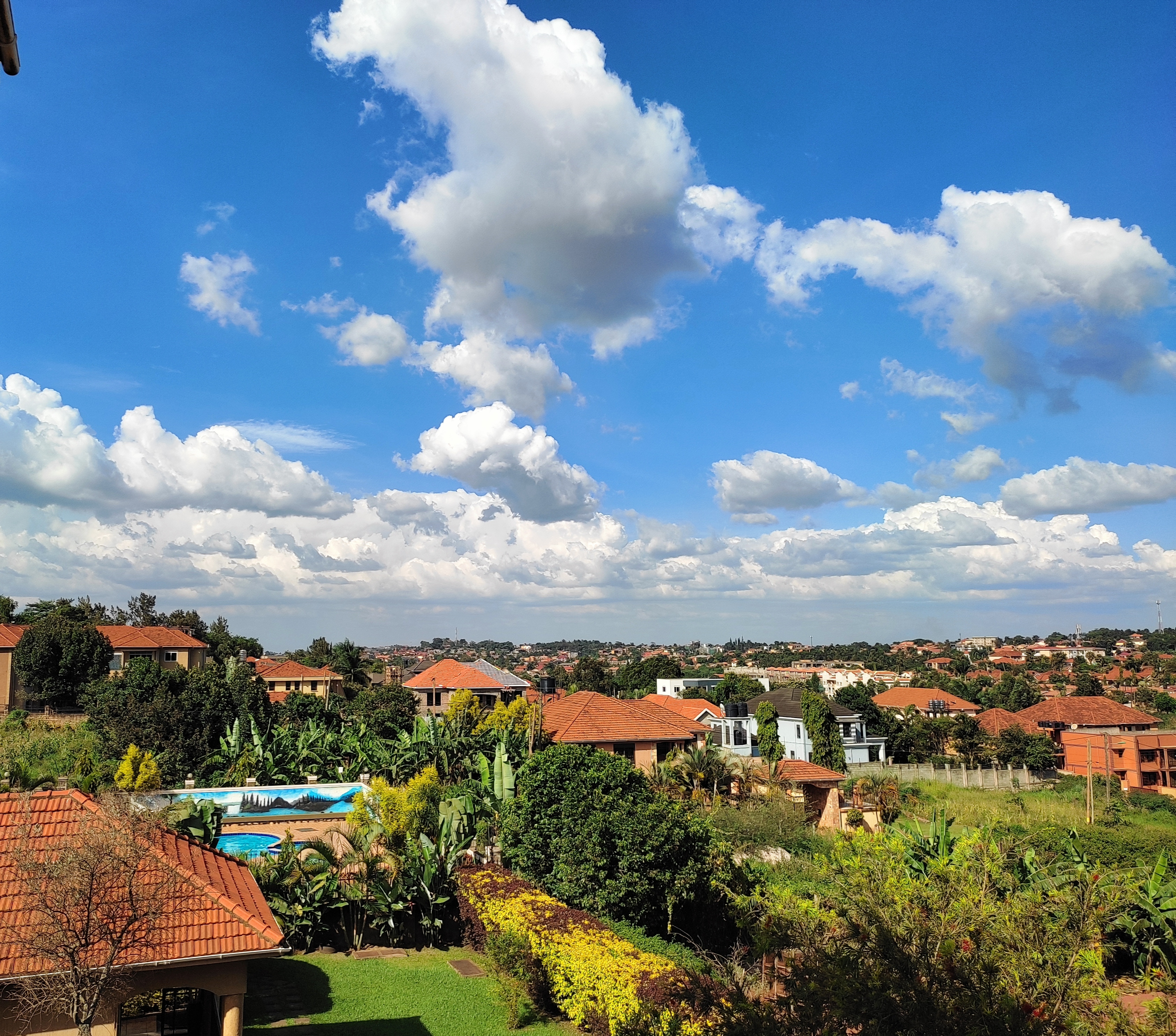

- Location in Kampala
- Coordinates: 00°21′56″N 32°37′31″E
- Country: Uganda
- Region: Central Region
- District: Kampala Capital City Authority
- Division: Nakawa Division
- Elevation: 4,000 ft (1,220 m)

Kiwaatule is a township within the city of Kampala, Uganda's capital.

== Location ==
Kiwaatule is bordered by Najjera to the north, Naalya to the east, Banda to the south, Ntinda to the south-west, Kigoowa to the west, and Kulambiro to the north-west. It is approximately 11 kilometres (6.8 mi), by road, north-east of Kampala's central business district. The coordinates of Kiwaatule are 0°21'56.0"N, 32°37'31.0"E (Latitude:0.365556; Longitude:32.625275).

== Overview ==
Kiwatule is mainly a middle class residential neighborhood with a smattering of commercial establishments. The Kampala Northern Bypass Highway traverses the neighborhood. The People's Progressive Party, one of the political parties in Uganda, maintains its headquarters at Kiwaatule.

== Points of interest ==
The following additional points of interest are located in or near Kiwaatule:

- Sunset Apartment Complex - A condominium and apartment development by National Housing and Construction Company

== See also ==
- Kyambogo
- Nakawa Division
