= Najjera =

- Location in Uganda
- Coordinates: 00°22′48″N 32°37′30″E
- Country: Uganda
- Region: Buganda
- District: Wakiso District
- Municipality: Kira Municipality
- Elevation: 3,900 ft (1,200 m)

Najjera, sometimes spelled as Najjeera is a neighborhood in Kira Municipality, Wakiso District, in the Buganda Region of Uganda.

== Location ==
Najjeera is a component of Kira Municipality, the second largest urban center in Uganda, behind the capital city of Kampala, according to the 2014 national population census. The neighborhood lies adjacent to Nakawa Division, one of the five administrative divisions of Kampala, the capital of Uganda and the largest city in that country. Najjera lies approximately 12 kilometres (7 mi), by road, northeast of the central business district of Kampala.

Downtown Kira lies to the north and east of Najjera, Ntinda, lies to the south, Kigoowa to the southwest, Kulambiro to the west and Komamboga to the northwest. The coordinates of Najjera are:+0° 22' 48.00"N, +32° 37' 30.00"E (Latitude:0.3800; Longitude:32.6250).

== Overview ==
Najjera is a bedroom community for the city of Kampala. Lying between the central business districts Uganda's two largest urban centers; Kampala and Kira, the neighborhood is a rapidly growing area with upscale housing units and several apartment complexes under construction. Many small businesses and cottage industries such as welding shops, restaurants, motels and automobile repair shops, as well as public and private schools are located in the neighborhood.

== Points of interest ==
The following points of interest can be found in or near Najjera:

(a) Najjera Progressive School, a privete school, grades K–P7 (b) Najjeera High School, a private mixed boarding middle school (grades S1–S4) (c) Triangle Tavern, a private establishment for relaxation and recreation (d) Esella Country Hotel, a private hospitality establishment

== See also ==
- Kisaasi
