= Federal institutions of Tanzania =

This is a list of the federal institutions of Tanzania.

== Legislative branch ==
- National Assembly of Tanzania

== Executive branch ==
=== President of Tanzania ===
- Samia Suluhu Hassan 2021-present
- John Magufuli 2015 - 2021
- President's Office, Planning Commission
- President's Office of Public Services Management

=== Vice President of Tanzania ===
- Samia Suluhu 2015-2021

=== Prime Minister of Tanzania ===
- Kassim Majaliwa 2015 - present

=== Other ===
- Nyalali Commission
- State House of Tanzania

=== Ministry of Works, Transport and Communication ===
- Air Tanzania
- Tanzania Airports Authority
- Tanzania Civil Aviation Authority
- Tanzania Government Flight Agency
- Tanzania Meteorological Agency
- Tanzania National Roads Agency (TANROADS)
- Tanzania Ports Authority
- Tanzania Railways Corporation
- Tanzania Communication Regulatory Authority (TCRA)
- Tanzania Telecommunications Company Limited (TTCL)
- Tanzania Electric Supply Company Limited (TANESCO)

=== Ministry of Defence and National Service ===
- Tanzania People's Defence Force
  - Army of Tanzania
  - Navy of Tanzania
  - Air Force of Tanzania

=== Ministry of Foreign Affairs, E.A.C, Regional and International Cooperation ===
- Diplomatic missions of Tanzania

=== Ministry of Energy and Minerals ===
- Tanzania Petroleum Development Corporation

=== Ministry of Finance and Planning ===
- Bank of Tanzania
- Economic and Social Research Foundation (ESRF)
- Parastatal Sector Reform Commission
- Public Service Pensions Fund (PSPF)
- National Social Security Fund (NSSF)
- Tanzania Revenue Authority (TRA)

=== Ministry of Health, Community Development, Gender, Seniors and Children ===
- Medical Stores Department
- National AIDS Control Programme
- Tanzania Commission for AIDS
- Tanzania Food and Drugs Authority (TFDA)

=== Ministry of Education, Science and Technology and Vocational Training ===
- Tanzania Atomic Energy Commission
- Tanzania Commission for Science and Technology

=== Ministry of Industry, Trade and Investment ===
- Board of External Trade
- Tanzania Chamber of Commerce, Industry and Agriculture
- Tanzania Investment Centre (TIC)

=== Ministry of Information, Culture, Artists and Sports ===
- Bagamoyo Art College
- Tanzania Football Federation

=== Ministry of Constitutional and Legal Affairs ===
- Judiciary of Tanzania
- Attorney General's Chambers
- Law Reform Commission of Tanzania
- Commission for Human Rights and Good Governance
- Registration, Insolvency and Trusteeship Agency
- The Law School of Tanzania
- Institute of Judicial Administration

=== Ministry of Lands, Housing and Human Settlements ===
- National Housing Corporation

=== Ministry of Natural Resources and Tourism ===
- National parks and protected areas
- Tanzania National Parks Authority (TANAPA)
- Tanzania Tourist Board (TTB)

=== Ministry of Water and Irrigation ===
- Water Resources Management Division
- Commercial Water Supply and Sewerage Services
- Community Water Supply
- Water Laboratory Unit
- Drilling and Dam Construction Agency

== Judicial branch ==
- Court of Appeal of Tanzania
  - Chief Justice of Tanzania
- Special Constitutional Court of the United Republic of Tanzania

== Regions and districts ==
- Please see Regions of Tanzania and Districts of Tanzania.

== Zanzibar ==
- President: Ali Mohamed Shein
- House of Representatives of Zanzibar
- Revolutionary Council (Zanzibar)

== See also ==
- Government of Tanzania
- Politics of Tanzania
