= TAEC =

TAEC is an acronym that can stand for

- Tanzania Atomic Energy Commission, a regulatory and service parastatal organization of Tanzania
- Toshiba America Electronic Components, a US branch of Toshiba
- The Australian Events Centre, an events centre based in Essendon Fields, Victoria, Australia
- Technology Associates EC INC, a wireless telecommunications consulting firm - Corporate headquarters, Carlsbad, CA
- Traditional Arts and Ethnology Centre, a museum in Luang Prabang, Lao PDR
- Turkish Air Engine Company, a joint venture between Kale Group and Rolls-Royce to develop aircraft engines in Türkiye
