= Kadic Hospital =

Coordinates: 00°20′59″N 32°36′15″E

- Kadic Health Services Limited

Geography
- Location: Kira Road; Bukoto Neighborhood; Naguru Hill, Kampala, Central Region, Uganda

Organisation
- Care system: Private
- Type: General

Services
- Emergency department: II
- Beds: 30 (2014)

History
- Opened: 1991

Links
- Website: www.kadichealth.org
- Lists: Hospitals in Uganda

The erstwhile Kadic Hospital, also known as Kadic Medical Centre, was an urban, private, hospital in Kampala, the capital of Uganda and the largest city in that country. The hospital was taken over by Victoria Hospital Limited and renamed UMC Victoria Hospital in January 2017. Following the commissioning of the newly constructed state-of-art UMC Victoria Hospital, located across the road, was decommissioned in January 2018 and reopened in 2025 as the Annex Wing of UMC Victoria Hospital. This wing now provides a variety of services, including the Children's Clinic, Physiotherapy, Refine Skin Clinic, Dental Clinic, and UMC Opticals. Additionally, a dedicated COVID-19 Annex Wing was established during 2020-21 to support the response and care for patients during the COVID-19 pandemic.

== Location ==
The hospital is located on Plot number 86, Kira Road, in the Bukoto neighborhood, on Naguru Hill, in Kampala, Uganda's capital city. This is about 4 kilometres (2 mi) east of Mulago National Referral Hospital. The coordinates of Kadic Hospital are: 0°20'59.0"N, 32°36'15.0"E (Latitude:0.349717; Longitude:32.604159).

== Overview ==
In 1991, married couple Henry Kasozi and Sayuni Kasozi started the Kampala Diagnostic and Imaging Centre (KADIC), out of rented premises in Naakulabye, a middle and low income neighborhood in Kampala's Lubaga Division. Henry was about to retire as a professor of radiology at Makerere University School of Medicine, where he taught between 1974 and 1993.

Within two years, they outgrew their rented premises. They acquired land in Bukoto and built new premises that houses the main hospital. They maintain clinics at three other locations in the city, including in Naakulabye, where they started. As of 2014, the hospital employed over 130 people, owned four ambulances, and treated over 4,000 outpatients and inpatients every month, with a monthly salary payroll exceeding Sh100 million.

In 2016–17, the facility (KADIC Hospital - Bukoto) was purchased by Victoria Hospital Limited and renamed UMC Victoria Hospital.

== Affiliated entities ==
- Victoria Hospital Limited, in addition to the erstwhile KADIC Hospital, also operates:
  - UMC Victoria Hospital - state-of-art newly constructed tertiary care hospital opposite erstwhile KADIC

== See also ==
- List of hospitals in Uganda
