= Kulambiro =

- Map of Kampala showing the location of Kulambiro.
- Coordinates: 00°22′30″N 32°36′36″E
- Country: Uganda
- Region: Central Uganda
- District: Kampala Capital City Authority
- Division: Nakawa Division
- Elevation: 1,260 m (4,130 ft)
- Time zone: UTC+3 (EAT)

Kulambiro, sometimes spelled as Kkulambiro, is a neighborhood within the city of Kampala, Uganda's capital and largest city.

== Location ==
Located in Nakawa Division, the location is traversed by the Kampala Northern Bypass Highway. The highway passes between Kulambiro to the north and Kigoowa to the south, as it courses its way from Kiwaatule to the east, towards Kisaasi and Bukoto to the west of Kulambiro.

Kulambiro is bordered by Komamboga to the north, Najjeera to the northeast and east, Kiwaatule to the southeast, Kigoowa to the south, and by Kisaasi and Kanyanya to the west. This location is about 11 kilometres (6.8 mi), by road, northeast of Kampala's central business district. The coordinates of Kulambiro are:0°22'30.0"N, 32°36'36.0"E (Latitude:0.3750; Longitude:32.6100).

== Overview ==
Kulambiro is a middle-class residential area in Nakawa Division, in northeastern Kampala. With the completion of the Kampala Northern Bypass Highway, which separates Kulambiro from Kigoowa to the south, the urbanization of this hitherto rural part of Wakiso District, has begun in earnest.

== See also ==
- KCCA
- Nakawa Division
- Northern Bypass
- Kiwaatule
- Kigoowa
