= Kalerwe Market =

Kalerwe Market is one of Uganda's largest markets and is located on Gayaza Road adjacent the Northern By-pass about 5 kilometres (3.1 mi) from Kampala City centre. The market sells primarily fruits, vegetables and meat from all around Uganda, including Luweero, Mbarara, Wakiso and Mukono among others.

== Location and hours ==
- Address: Kalerwe Market is situated along Gayaza Road, adjacent to the Northern By-pass in Kampala.
- Hours: The roadside market is generally open daily from early morning until the evening. The typical hours for the Kalerwe Roadside Market are 6 a.m. to 7 p.m. from Monday to Saturday, and it is usually closed on Sunday.

== History ==
There are differing accounts of how Kalerwe Market acquired its name. According to long-time traders, the name is closely linked to the railway infrastructure that once passed through the area. The Uganda Railways Corporation operated the Kasese line, which connected Kampala to western Uganda, including Kasese and Ibanda, and also had a branch line to Bombo. The area where the market is located today was formerly part of the greater Mulago area, and the railway played a central role in transporting both passengers and goods.

The name Kalerwe was chosen during the early 1980s, in the formative years of the National Resistance Army (NRA) regime, when Resistance Councils (later renamed Local Councils) were established. A meeting of traders and residents was convened under these councils to agree on the name, with the intention of preserving the memory of the railway line that had once run through the area.

== Ownership and management ==
The market is owned by the government, under the purview of KCCA. The government's policy, established by President Yoweri Museveni, banned private investors from managing city markets and directed that the markets be leased to the vendors themselves, operating as cooperative groups.

However, some sections within the general Kalerwe market area are on private land. For instance, St Kizito Market in Kalerwe is on land owned by a private individual, and the Uganda National Roads Authority (UNRA) also owns part of the road reserve that runs through the market.

The Kampala City Council Authority (KCCA) officially took over the management of all city markets including Kalerwe to streamline operations and end wrangles. They work with market leadership and vendors' associations to manage day-to-day operations.

== Produce sold in Kalerwe Market ==
The items on sale in the market include, but are not limited to the following:

- Fruits
- Bananas
- Vegetables
- Matooke
- Cassava
- Beans
- Potatoes
- Chicken
- Goat meat
- Fish

== See also ==
- Nakawa Market
