= Ivan Kirabo =

- Born: Ivan Kirabo; December 26, 1996 (age 29) Naguru, Kampala, Uganda
- Occupation: Rugby player

Rugby union career
- Position: Scrum-half
- Current team: Rhinos RFC
Senior career
Years	Team	Apps	(Points)
- Rhinos RFC
2016–2017	Kabras Sugar RFC		
International career
Years	Team	Apps	(Points)
- Uganda

Ivan Kirabo is a Ugandan rugby player who has played as scrum-half for clubs Rhinos RFC of Uganda and Kabras RFC of Kenya, and has represented Uganda at the international level.

== Early life and education ==
Kirabo was born on December 26, 1996, in Naguru, Kampala, Uganda. He is a son to Edward Peter and Harriet Mugisha. He grew up in a family of five brothers and two sisters. Several of his siblings were involved in rugby during their youth which introduced Kirabo to the sport at an early age.

At the age of 12, Kirabo began playing organized rugby. He joined the under-14 Tigers rugby team, which was coached by the ex-Christine Kizito. Over the years, he took part in several rugby development programs including Bootkamp, Summerkamp (Warriors), Boks and Kobs.

== Club career ==
Kirabo started his senior club rugby career in Uganda, playing for Rhinos RFC. He later joined Kabras Sugar RFC in Kenya during a period when the club recruited several Ugandan players. His first stint with Kabras was brief, as he returned to Uganda following the illness and eventual death of his mother.

After returning, he joined Rhinos RFC. Later, he accepted a second invitation from Kabras Sugar RFC and played for them during the 2016/2017 Kenya Cup season, where he featured as a starting scrum-half.

== International career ==
Kirabo was selected for the Uganda national rugby team during preparations for the Elgon Cup against Kenya. He was named in the match-day squad and played in the fixture, which ended in a 23-18 loss for Uganda. This appearance marked his debut at the senior international level.

== Playing position ==
Ivan Kirabo primarily plays as a scrum-half. He has also taken on kicking responsibilities during portions of his club career, depending on team requirements.
