= Charles Twiine =

Charles Twiine is a Ugandan police officer who served as the spokesperson of the Criminal Investigation Directorate (CID) of the Uganda Police Force, before he was accused of several charges in courts of law.

== Career ==
He served as the spokesperson of the Criminal Investigation Directorate (CID) of the Uganda Police Force. During his tenure of work he regularly reported and addressed the media on ongoing investigations, arrests and law enforcement operation. During his role, he represented the Uganda Police Force in matters related to crime, fraud and cyber investigation. Twine served as the CID Spokesperson during the time of Grace Akullo. He was transferred from CID when Maj Tom Magambo replaced Akullo. He also served as the Detective Assistant Superintendent of Police(ASP)

== Controversies and arrests ==
Between April 2024 and 2025 Twine was accused on acts of misuse of computers to share information that claimed that Bahima are killers. It was Twine has done this in various places in Kampala. He was accused of using media to attack top Ugandan leaders. Twine faced eight charges including hate speech against the Chief of UPDF Gen Muhoozi Keinerugaba using social media, inciting violence, was arrested alongside Noah Mitala alias Nuwa Mutwe.

In 2025, after returning from official duties where he had accompanied members of parliament, he arrived Naguru police headquarters the next morning at around 7:30 am and held a meeting with the Inspector General of Police (IGP) Abbas Byakagaba and the deputy, Maj Gen James Ochaya. After Twine was handed over to SFC commandos that had been waiting for him, they took him away and his vehicle remained parked at the police headquarters at Naguru. After the arrest his known phones were unavailable. SFC is an elite military brigade responsible for protecting the President and key government installations. After nearly two weeks of missing, he was brought before Buganda Road Chief Magistrate Road Kayizzi were he denied the charges brought Computer Misuse Act and was remanded to Luzira until June 5, 2025, pending further proceedings.

Later the Chief Magistrate Ronald Kayizzi of Buganda Road court granted him a bail on cash of Shs 5 million ending nearly a month of detention. Each of his four sureties was bonded at Shs 50 million. However, the person he was accused with was denied bail due to lack of substantial sureties. Both of them were accused of hate speech against key officials in the government.

== See also ==
- Uganda Police Force
- Gen Muhoozi Keinerugaba
