= Kisaasi =

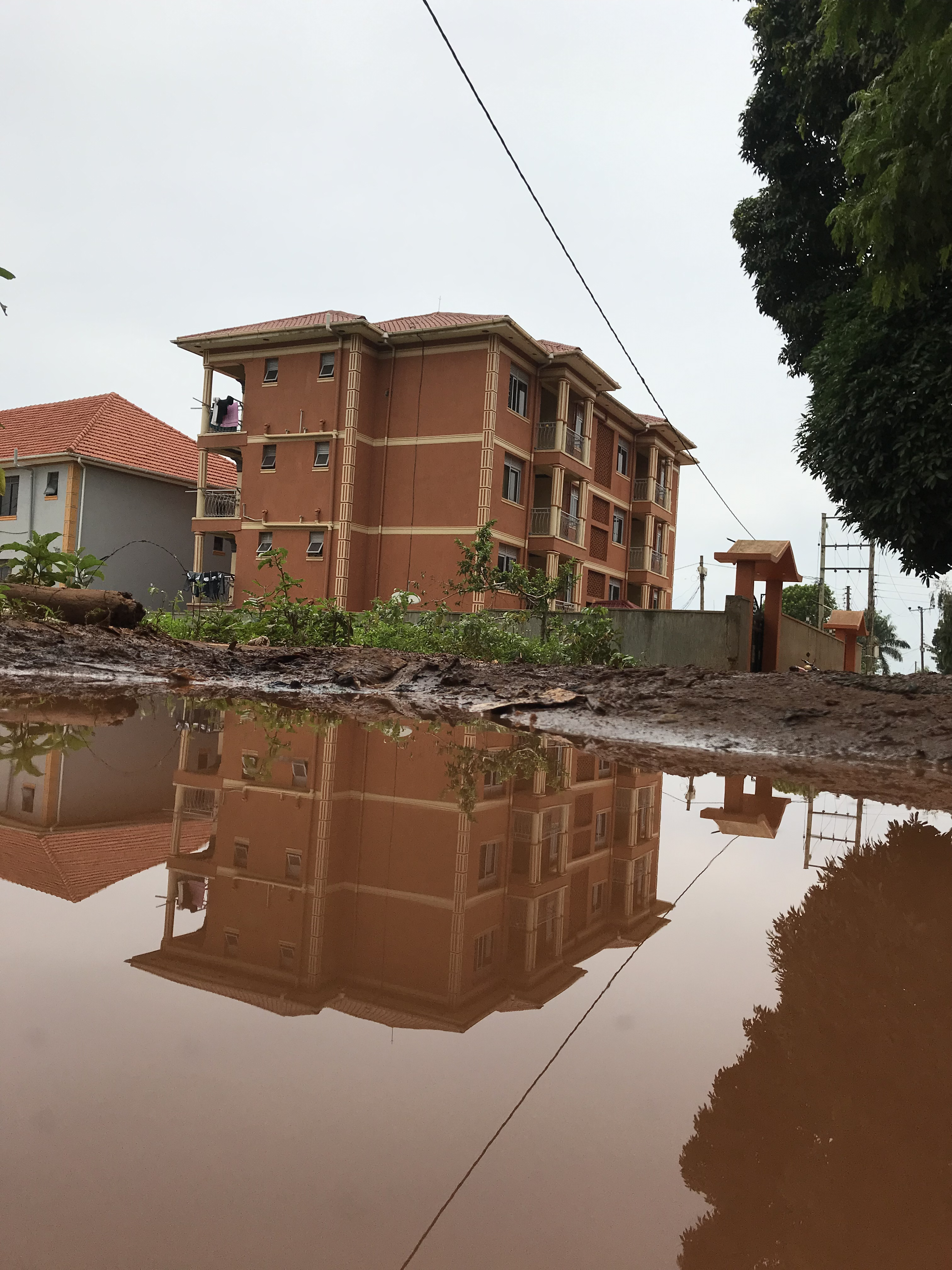

- Location in Kampala
- Coordinates: 00°22′10″N 32°35′06″E
- Country: Uganda
- Region: Central Uganda
- District: Kampala Capital City Authority
- Division: Kawempe Division
- Elevation: 3,900 ft (1,200 m)

Kisaasi is a location, within the city of Kampala, Uganda.

== Location ==
Kisaasi is located in Kawempe Division, in northern Kampala. It is bordered by Ntinda and Bukoto to the south, Kigoowa to the southeast, Kulambiro to the east, Komamboga to the northeast, Unincorporated Wakiso District to the north, Kawempe to the west and Kyebando to the southwest. This location is approximately 7.5 kilometres (4.7 mi), by road, northeast of Kampala's central business district. The coordinates of Kisaasi are:0°22'10.0"N, 32°36'10.0"E (Latitude:0.369450; Longitude:32.602767).

== Demographics ==
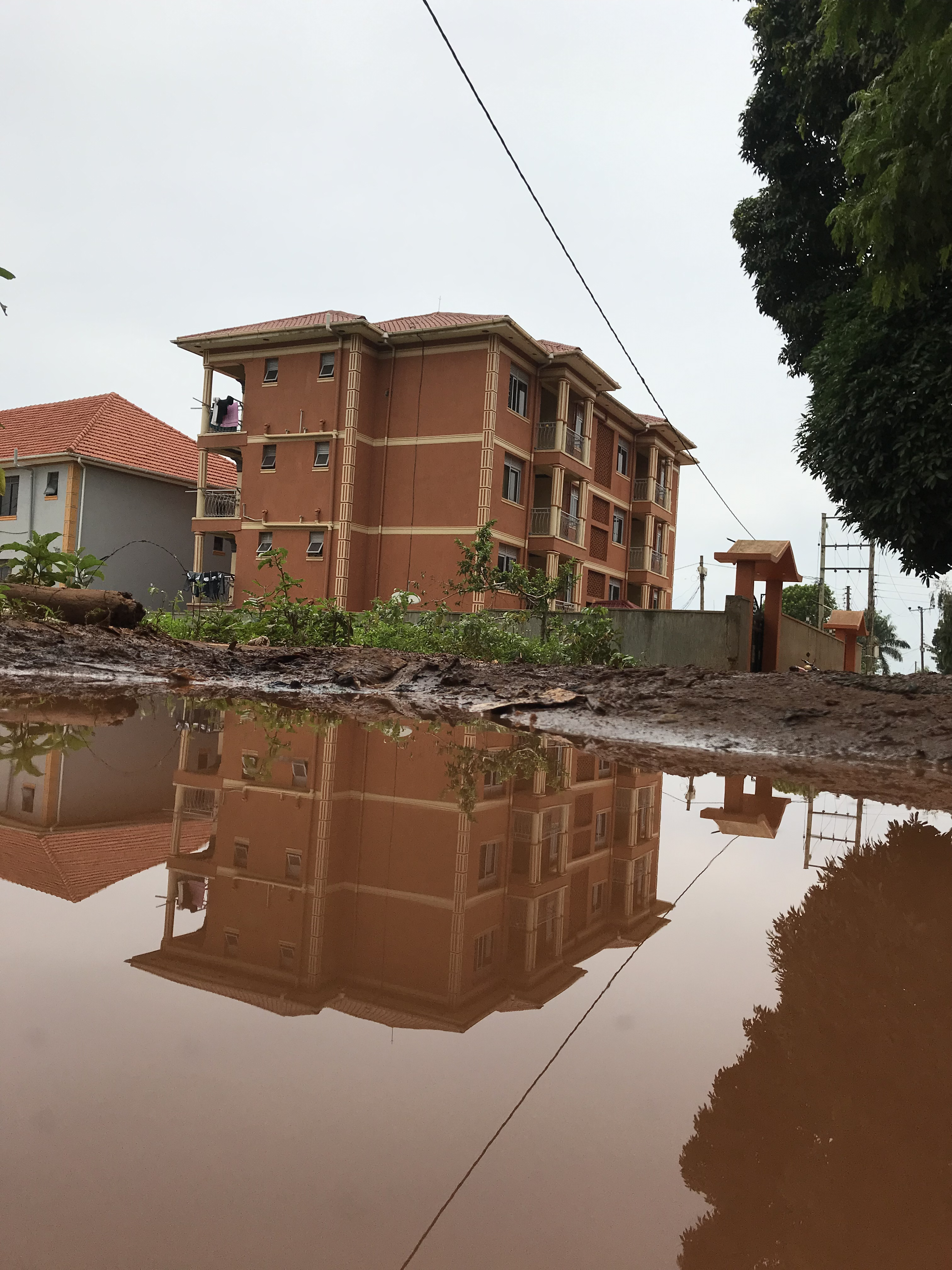
Apartments in Kisaaasi

Kisaasi is a middle class residential neighborhood, with clusters of upscale residencies. A local professional performing arts group, Ndere Troupe has constructed a performing arts theater, the Ndere Center, within the area. Since 2011, Kampala Capital City Authority (KCCA), has improved the road network in the neighborhood to the delight of many residents and businesses. One such road is the Bukoto-Kisaasi Road, which has been widened and tarmacked.

== Points of interest ==
The following points of interest lie in or near Kisaasi:

- The Kampala Northern Bypass Highway - The highway passes through the southern part of Kisaasi in an east to west direction.
- The Ndere Center - A performing arts complex owned by Ndere Troupe. The complex includes a guest house.
- Kensington Kensington Luxury Heights - A residential housing development by Kensington Africa Limited, a developer with subdivisions in Naguru, and on Lugogo Bypass in Kololo. kisota road

Are

== See also ==
- Kampala District
- Kawempe Division
- Mpererwe
- Ntinda
