= Kigoowa =

- Location in Kampala
- Coordinates: 00°21′45″N 32°36′54″E
- Country: Uganda
- Region: Central Uganda
- District: Kampala Capital City Authority
- Division: Nakawa Division
- Elevation: 4,070 ft (1,240 m)

Kigoowa is a location within the city of Kampala, Uganda's capital.

== Location ==
Located in Nakawa Division, Kigoowa is bordered by Kulambiro to the north, Kiwaatule to the east, Ntinda to the south, Naguru and Bukoto to the southwest and Kyebando to the west. The location of the township is approximately 7.5 kilometres (4.7 mi), by road, northeast of Kampala's central business district The coordinates of Kigoowa are:0°21'45.0"N, 32°36'54.0"E (Latitude:0.3625; Longitude:32.6150).

== Demographics ==
Prior to the construction of the Kampala Northern Bypass Highway, Kigoowa was primarily a bedroom community of middle-class single family homes. Those homes became more upscale when Ntinda became a major commercial location within the city of Kampala, during the 1990s and early 2000s. With the construction of the Northern Bypass, commercial construction has begun to appear along the highway, and at street junctions.

== Points of interest ==
The following points of interest lie in or near Kigoowa:

- The Kampala Northern Bypass Highway - Passes between Kulambiro to the north and Kigoowa to the south
- Kalinaabiri Primary School
- Saint Andrew Kaggwa Church - The Catholic church for Kigoowa Parish; named after St. Andrew Kaggwa, one of the Uganda Martyrs.
- Kigoowa Infants Primary School
- Kigoowa Catholic Women's Development Association
- St. Yosefu Church of Uganda
- Kigoowa Office of Uganda Women's Network
- Harvest Miracle Centre Kigoowa - A place of worship affiliated with the Pentecostal Movement

== See also ==
- Nakawa
- Kiwaatule
- Kulambiro
- Ntinda
- Kisaasi
- Bukoto
