= Judiciary of Tanzania =

System of courts in Tanzania

Judiciary of Tanzania (Mahakama ya Tanzania)
- Timely and Accessible Justice to All

SERVICE OVERVIEW
- Former Doctrine: Tanganyika Order in Council 1920
- Current Constitution: United Republic of Tanzania, 1977; Article 107A (1) and 107B
- Country: Tanzania
- Controlling authority: Court of Appeal of the United Republic
- Hierarchy of Courts in Tanzania: 1.Court of Appeal; 2.High Courts; 3.Resident Magistrates Courts; 4.District / Primary Courts
- Post Designation: Justice; Judge; Magistrate - Judicial & Executive
- Bar Association: Tanganyika Law Society

HEAD OF JUDICIARY
- Chief Justice of Tanzania: George Mcheche Masaju

The Judiciary of Tanzania is the system of courts that interprets and applies the law in Tanzania. The current judiciary bases its foundation to the constitution of the United Republic of Tanzania of 1977. Under the Constitution of Tanzania, Justices and Magistrates are independent of the government and subject only to the Constitution and the law. The country has a dual juristition system where there is a judicial structure responsible for Tanzania Mainland and another for Zanzibar. The Court of Appeal of the United Republic was established in 1979 as the final appellate judicial body with jurisdiction over the entire union.

== History ==
Once the British assumed control of Tanganyika in 1920, through Article 17 of the Tanganyika Order in Council, 1920 established the High Court of Tanganyika. The British set up a dual hierarchy system which consisted of the High Court and Subordinate Courts which primarily operated according to English Common Law.

Tanganyika gained its independence in 1961 and went through several rounds of interim constitutions before establishing the current constitution in 1977. By this time the Union of Tanganyika and Zanzibar had been concluded and a dual jurisdiction system was formed where Tanzania Mainland and Zanzibar maintained their own judicial hierarchy systems. As part of the 1977 constitution an appellate court was established on August 15, 1979, called the Court of Appeal of the United Republic. The court is a successor to the East African Court of Appeal and was founded as a court with jurisdiction over both the mainland and Zanzibar.

== Judicial Hierarchy ==
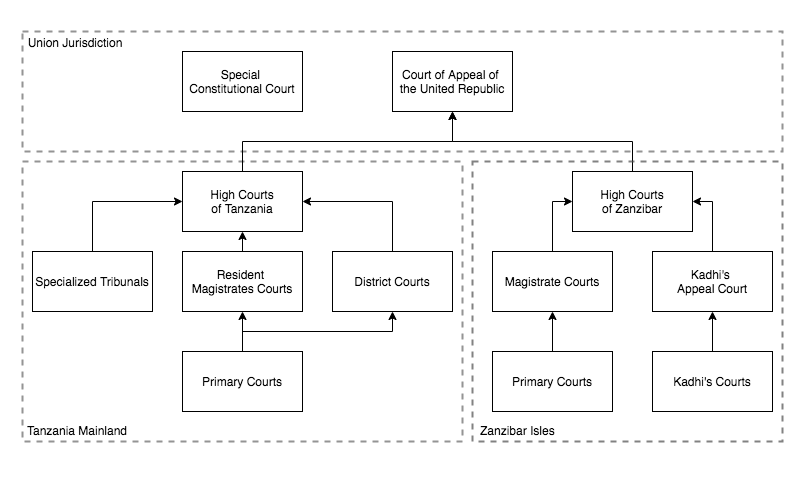
Schematic of the Courts of Tanzania

=== High Courts ===
The High Courts was established under article 108(1) of the 1977 Constitution of the United Republic of Tanzania. The court has unlimited jurisdiction to handle all types of cases. All appeals from the subordinate courts go to the High Court. The High courts are headed by a Principal Judge. The Principal Judge and other Judges of the High Court are appointed by the President after consultation with the Judicial Service Commission. The High court also has three specialized divisions Commercial, Land & Labour to help expedite cases in these areas

Mainland Tanzania currently has 14 regional based high courts with the headquarters based in Dar es Salaam.

=== District / Subordinate courts ===
There are two types of courts within this level that share the same level of jurisdiction, District courts and Resident Magistrate courts. These were established under the Magistrate Courts Act of 1984. District courts are found in all districts in the country and Resident Magistrate courts are mainly found in larger cities and serve as regional headquarters for district courts. They also receive appeals from Primary courts, however, one can go directly to a subordinate court if they wish.

=== Primary Courts ===
Primary Courts are the lowest courts in the country. In 2020 there were almost 700 primary courts spread across the country. They handle criminal and civil cases of customary nature.

=== Revolutionary Government of Zanzibar ===
The High Court of Zanzibar is the highest court within the Isles. There are two High courts in the isles one in Unguja and another in Pemba Island. The highest judge of Zanzibar is the Chief Justice of Zanzibar. Zanzibar has a very similar judicial structure to the Mainland except that Zanzibar retains Islamic courts referred to as Kadhi Courts.

This is a court that hears civil matters relating to Sharia law. The parties involved must all be followers of Islam and all must agree that the matter to be decided under Islamic law. The matter must be civil in nature e.g. Divorce, succession etc. The court is headed by a Chief Kadhi and parliament is given the authority to enact laws describing the guidelines, qualification and jurisdiction of this court. Appeals from Kadhi Court are heard by the Kadhi's Appeal Courts.

=== Special Constitutional Court ===
Article 125 of the 1977 constitution establishes the Special Constitutional Court. The special court is only established when there is a dispute on the interpretation the Constitution between the Government of the United Republic and the Revolutionary Government of Zanzibar. The court does not have the power to interfere or overrule any decisions made by the High Courts or the Court of appeal. The appointment of judges are done individually per dispute. Half the members hail from the law society of Mainland Tanzania and the other half from Zanzibar.
