= Ntinda =

- Map of Kampala showing the location of Ntinda.
- Coordinates: 00°21′18″N 32°36′52″E
- Country: Uganda
- Region: Central Uganda
- District: Kampala Capital City Authority
- Division: Nakawa Division
- Elevation: 1,200 m (3,900 ft)
- Time zone: UTC+3 (EAT)

Ntinda is a location in northeastern Kampala, the capital city of Uganda.

== Location ==
Ntinda lies in Nakawa Division, one of the five administrative divisions of Kampala. It is bordered by Kyambogo to the east, Nakawa to the south, Naguru to the west, Bukoto to the northwest, Kigoowa to the north, and Kiwatule to the northeast. This location is approximately 7 kilometres (4 mi), by road, northeast of Kampala's central business district. The coordinates of Ntinda are 0°21'18.0"N, 32°36'52.0"E (Latitude:0.355004; Longitude:32.614437).

== History ==
During the 1960s and 1970s, Ntinda was a small trading center with a few shops, a farmers market, and several housing estates for employees of the East African Railways.

After the regime changes in the country in the 1980s, Ntinda became attractive to the well-to-do, and upscale residential neighborhoods began to spring up in the area. One such residential neighborhood had so many Uganda Cabinet Ministers taking up residence that it became known as "Ministers Village". Gilbert Bukenya, a former vice president of Uganda, owns a home in the area. Ntinda has an upscale shopping mall called "Capital Shoppers City", with a supermarket, banks, shoe stores, a restaurant, and a cake-making business. Surface and underground parking are available, along with armed security.

== Points of interest ==
The following points of interest are located in or near Ntinda:

- Ntinda Vocational Training Institute - a Government Vocational Training institute under Ministry of Education and Sports (Uganda), supervised by the department of Business Technical Vocational Education and Training (BTVET).
- St. Luke's Church (CoU) .
- Ntinda Mosque
- St. Charles Lwanga Catholic Church
- Agape Baptist Church
- Ntinda Shopping Centre - A multi-story shopping complex with parking and handicapped access.
- Ntinda Police Station - A branch of the Uganda National Police
- Tuskys Supermarket (Ntinda)

== See also ==
- Kampala Northern Bypass Highway
- Kampala Capital City Authority
- Kisaasi
- Banda, Uganda
