= Naguru, Uganda =

Naguru
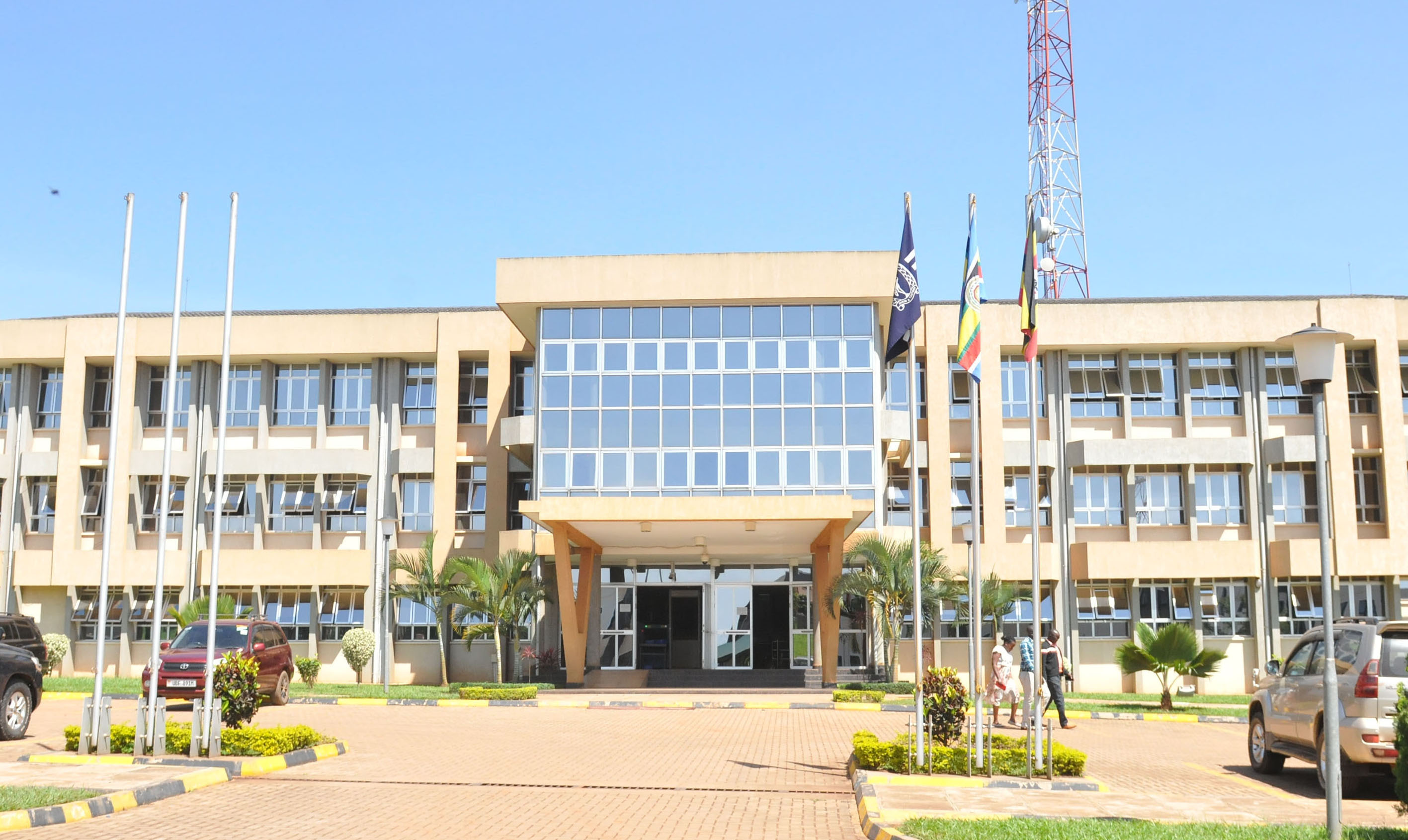
- Naguru
- Nickname: Naggulu
- Map of Kampala showing the location of Naguru
- Coordinates: 00°20′48″N 32°36′20″E
- Country: Uganda
- Region: Central Uganda
- District: Kampala District
- Division: Nakawa Division
- Elevation: 1,300 m (4,300 ft)
- Time zone: UTC+3 (EAT)

Naguru, also Naggulu, is a hill in Kampala, the capital and largest city in Uganda. The name also applies to the commercial and residential neighborhoods that sit on that hill.

== Location ==
Naguru is located in Nakawa Division, in the northeastern part of the city. It is bordered by Ntinda to the east, Nakawa to the southeast, Namuwongo to the south, Kololo to the southwest, Kamwookya to the west, Bukoto to the northwest and Kigoowa to the north. Its location is approximately 4.5 kilometres (2.8 mi), northeast of Kampala's central business district. The coordinates of Naguru Hill are:00 20 48N, 32 36 20E (Latitude:0.34653331; Longitude:32.6055).

== Overview ==
Naggulu Hill rises 1,300 metres (4,300 ft) above sea level. The view from this hill is incredible; one can see the tops of most of the other hills: Kololo, Muyenga, Mbuya and Mutungo. The top of the hill houses radio and telecommunication masts for the many communication companies in the city. The upper reaches of the hill are also the location of upscale residential mansions with manicured lawns. The well-landscaped hill also boasts of good guesthouses and recreation centers. These include: (a) Lugogo Rugby Club (b) Lugogo Tennis Club and (c) Lugogo Cricket Club. At the base of the hill is the Uganda Manufacturers Association (UMA) show ground, where the annual trade fairs are staged. On the southeastern slopes of the hill, the headquarters of Uganda National Police are located. There is a reservoir water tank belonging to National Water and Sewerage Corporation (NWSC), at the summit.

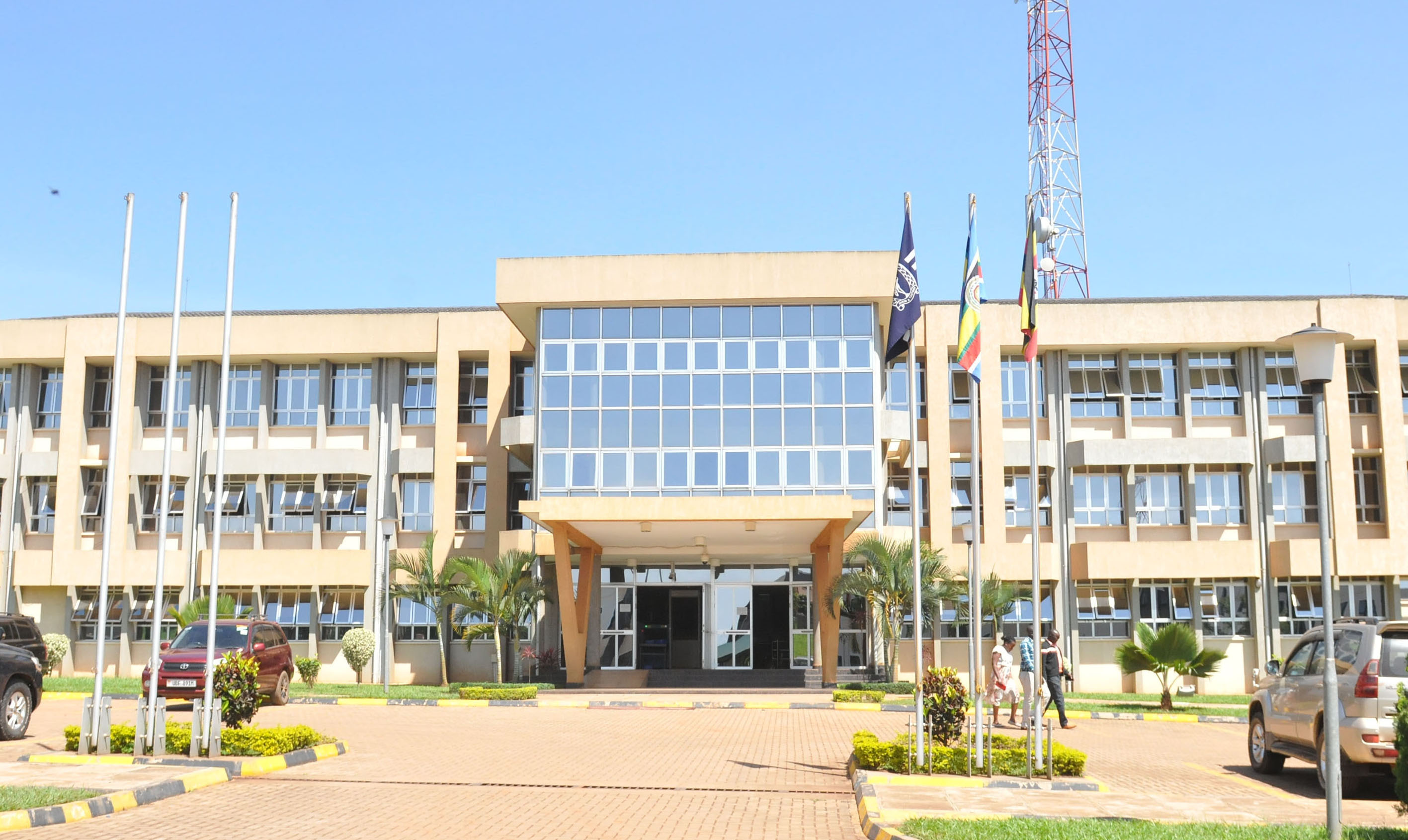
Uganda Police Headquarters, Naguru.jpg

Slums in Naguru.

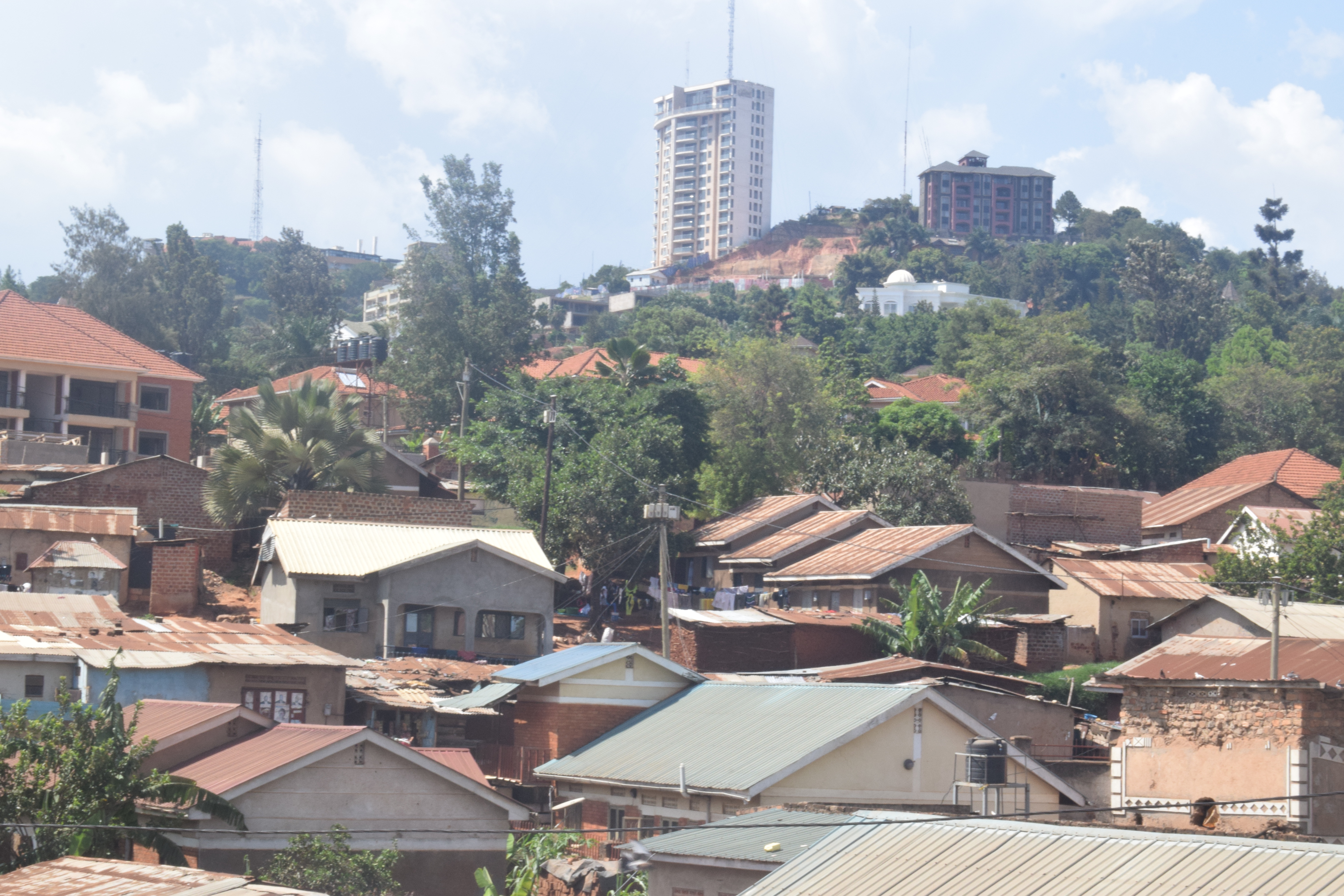

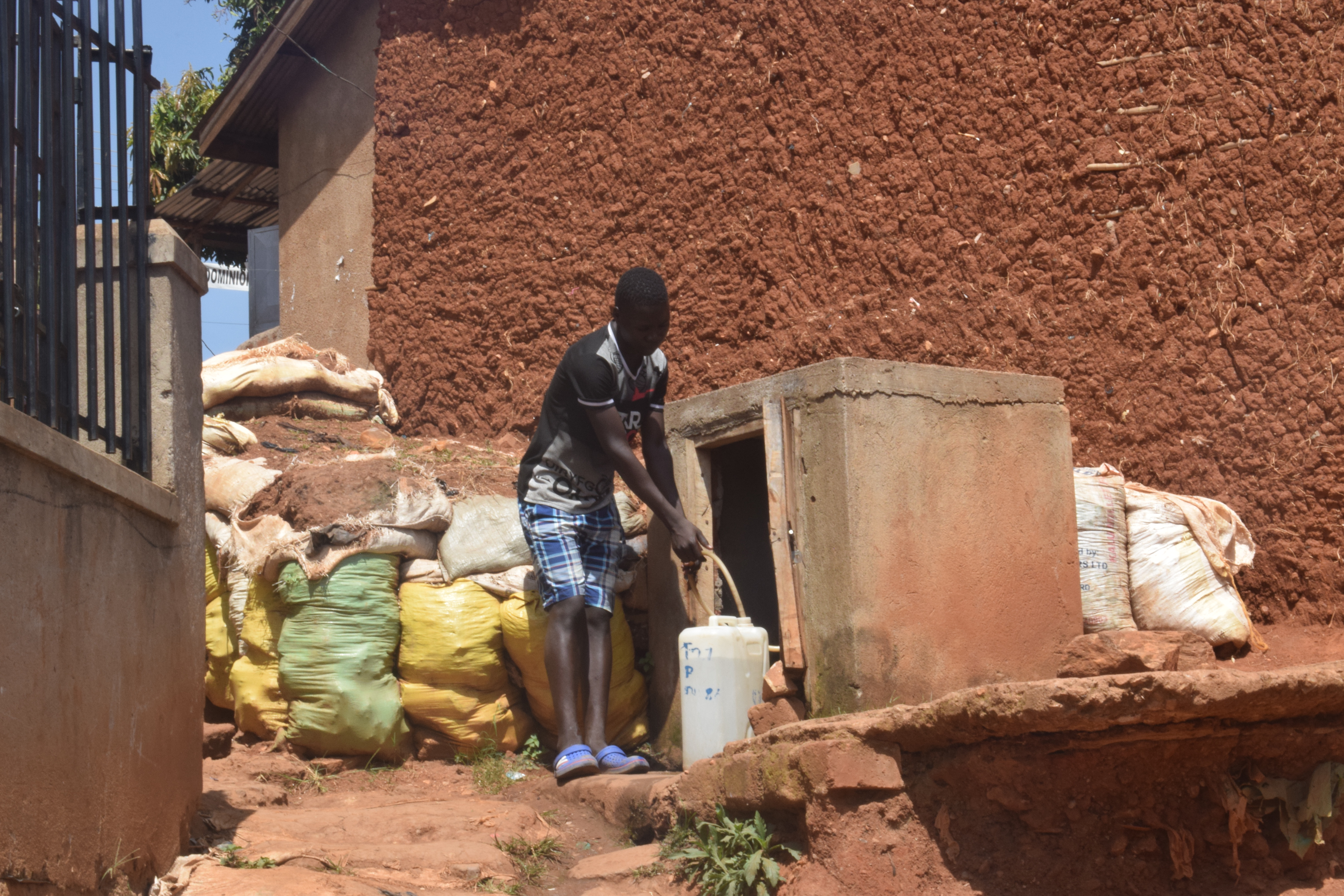

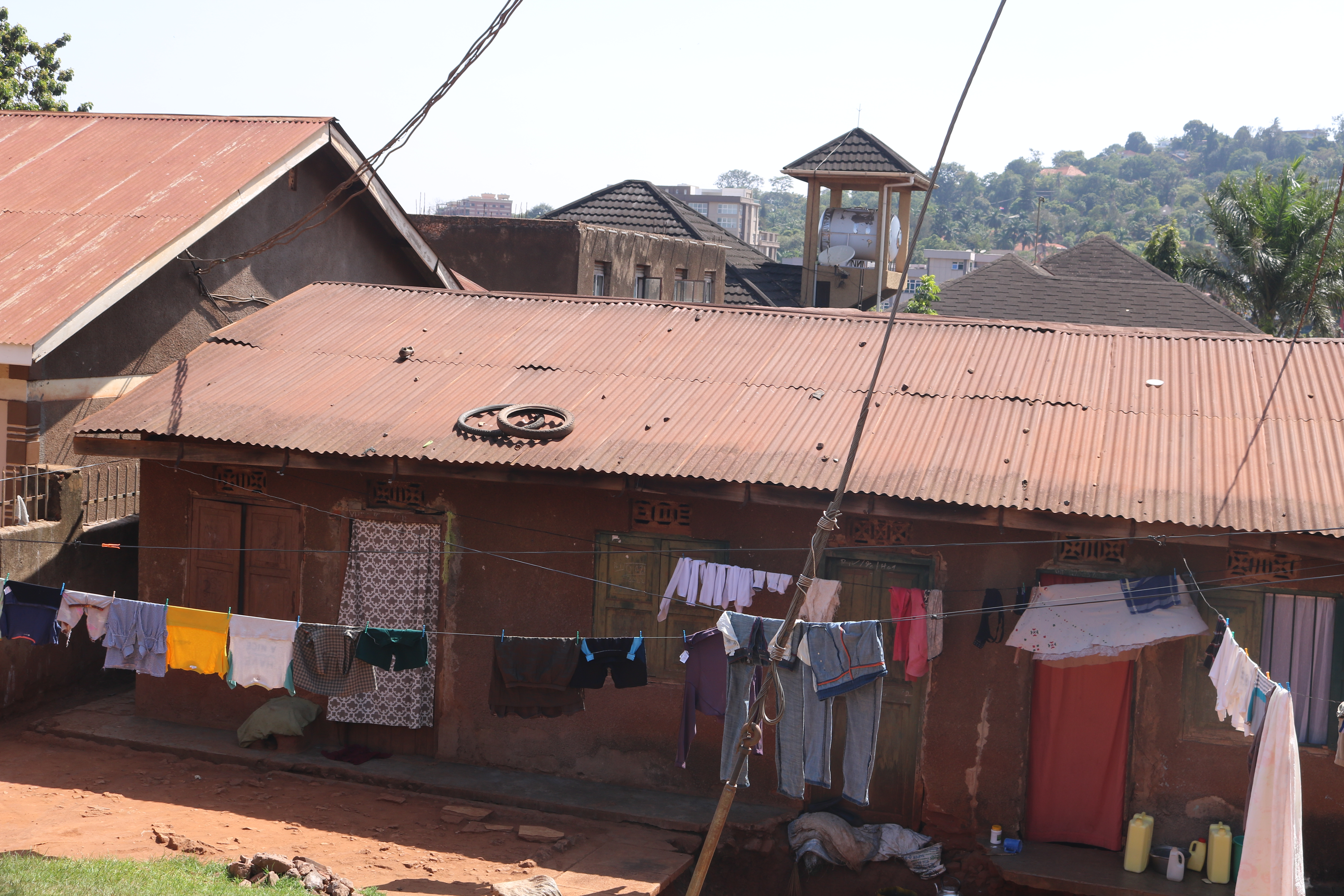

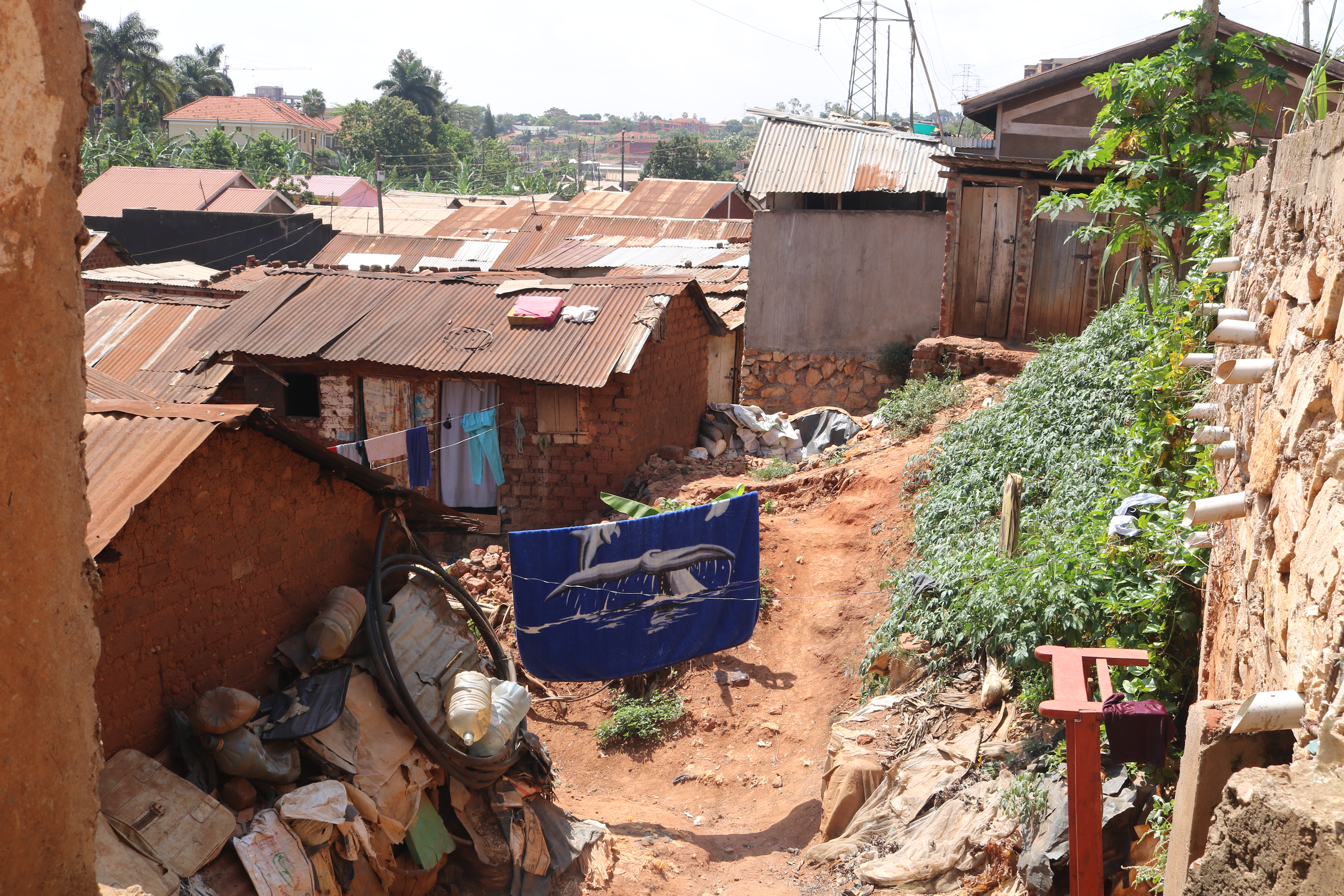

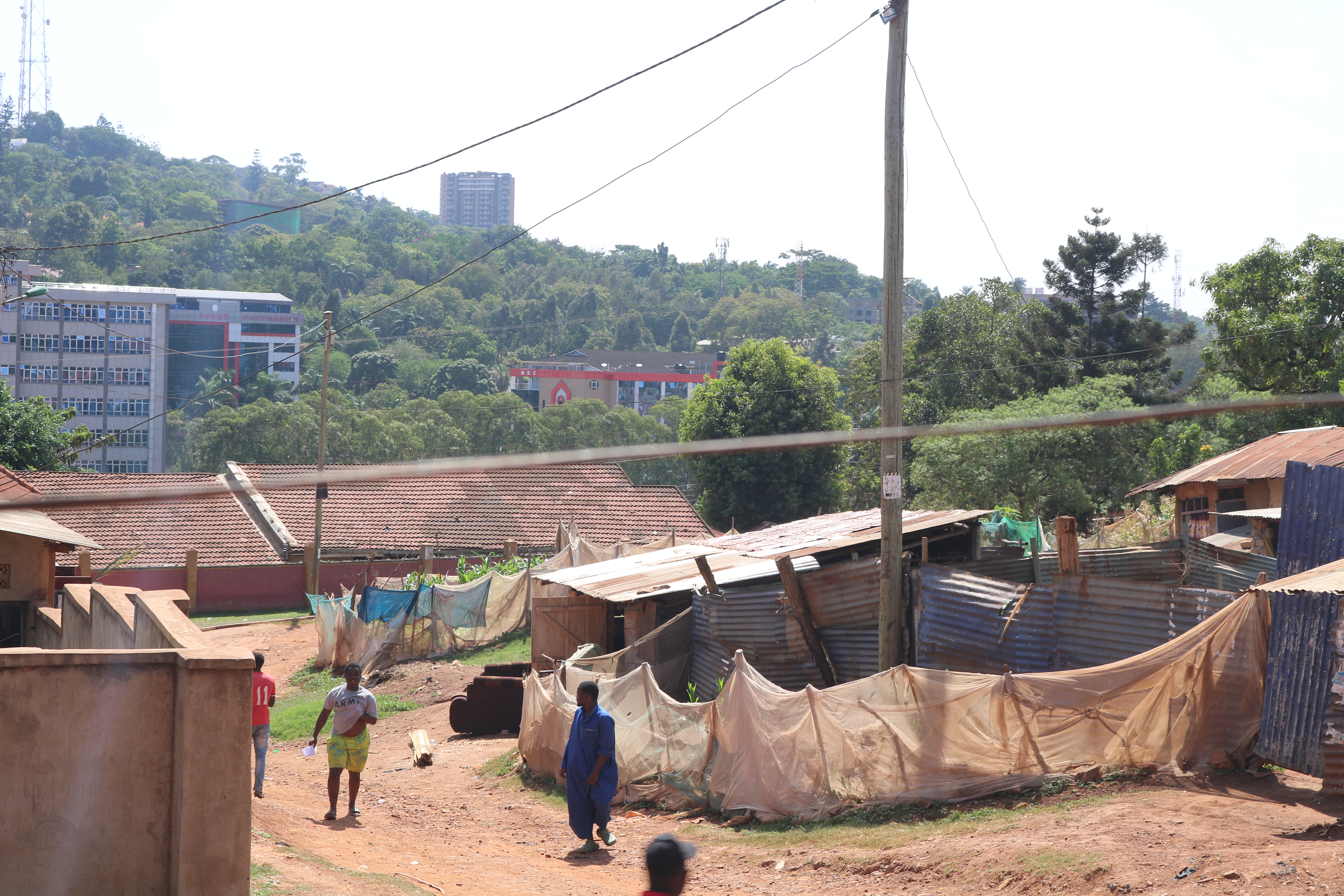

== Points of interest ==
The following points of interest lie on Naguru Hill or near its edges:

- The headquarters of the Uganda National Police
- The headquarters of the Uganda Ministry of Justice and Constitutional Affairs - In development.
- Naguru Sanyu Babies Home - A private orphanage administered by Sanyu Babies Homes, an NGO.
- Naguru Housing Estate - A public housing project, destined for demolition and modernization
- Naguru General Hospital - A 200-bed public hospital built with assistance of the Chinese Government and administered by the Uganda Ministry of Health.

== See also ==
- KCCA
- NWSC
- Nakawa Division
- Namuwongo
