= Nakawa Market =

- Map of Kampala showing the location of Nakawa Market.
- Coordinates: 00°19′48″N 32°36′42″E
- Country: Uganda
- Region: Central Uganda
- District: Kampala Capital City Authority
- Division: Nakawa Division
- Time zone: UTC+3 (EAT)

Nakawa Market, is a fresh produce market in Nakawa, a neighborhood in the city of Kampala, the capital and largest city of Uganda. It is one of the 51 markets in the city, as of June 2018.

== Location ==
Nakawa Market is located along the Kampala–Jinja Highway, in the neighborhood of Nakawa, in Kampala's Nakawa Division, approximately 5 kilometres (3 mi), by road, east of the central business district of the city. The geographical coordinates of Nakawa Market are: 0°19'48.0"N, 32°36'42.0"E (Latitude:0.3300; Longitude:32.6117).

== Overview ==
The Nakawa Market is one of the largest fresh produce markets in the city. As of June 2010, the market supported in excess of 7,000 produce vendors. It is a popular shopping venue for expatriates on assignments in the country and for locals who usually come on Fridays and Saturdays.

== Ownership and management ==
The land on which the market is built belongs to Kampala Capital City Authority (KCCA). Prior to the Authority's creation in 2011, the Nakawa Vendors Association, managed the market. However, revenue collection was sub-optimal and garbage collection was abysmal. When KCCA tried to take over management, the Association, at first resisted, then went to court and sued the Authority. The lawsuit as dismissed with costs in 2015. As of August 2018, Nakawa Market is managed by KCCA.

== Produce sold in Nakawa Market ==
The items on sale in the market include, but are not limited to the following. (a) fruits (b) vegetables (c) meat (d) poultry (e) textile (f) electronics (g) spices (h) matooke (i) pumpkin (j) eggs (k) coffee (l) Irish potatoes (m) raw sugarcane (N) agricultural produce such as beans, maize, rice, etc.
