= Bukoto =

- Map of Kampala showing the location of Bukoto
- Coordinates: 00°21′14″N 32°35′47″E
- Country: Uganda
- Region: Central Uganda
- District: Kampala Capital City Authority
- Division: Nakawa Division
- Elevation: 1,200 m (3,900 ft)
- Time zone: UTC+3 (EAT)

Bukoto is a township within the city of Kampala, Uganda's capital and largest metropolitan area.

== Location ==
Bukoto is bordered by Kisaasi to the north, Kigoowa to the north-east, Ntinda to the east, Naguru to the south-east, Kololo to the south, Kamwookya to the west, and Kyebando to the north-west. This location is approximately 8 kilometres (5 mi), by road, north-east of Kampala's central business district. The coordinates of Bukoto are 0°21'14.0"N, 32°35'47.0"E (Latitude:0.353889; Longitude:32.596389).

== Points of interest ==
The following points of interest lie inside or near Bukoto:

- The main branch of Pride Microfinance Limited, a Tier III Financial Institution, is located in Bukoto.
- Watoto Church - An orphanage and place of worship affiliated with the Pentecostal Church
- The Kampala Northern Bypass Highway - The highway passes through the northern reaches of Bukoto, in a west to east direction.
- Women's Hospital International and Fertility Centre - A private hospital specializing in the care of infertile couples
- Kadic Hospital, a 30-bed privately owned healthcare facility, a member of Kadic Health Services Limited
- UMC Victoria Hospital, located along Kira Road, is a private tertiary care facility with 100 in-patient beds and modern amenities including surgical theatres, MRI, CT Scan, and a cardiac catheterization laboratory. This is in addition to regular services, including X-ray, ultrasound and regular medical laboratory services.
