= Tanzania Atomic Energy Commission =

The Tanzania Atomic Energy Commission (also known by its acronym, TAEC) is the regulatory body responsible for all atomic energy matters in the United Republic of Tanzania. It was established under the Atomic Energy Act No. 7 of 2003. The formation of TAEC in 2003 came into effect after the repeal of the Protection from Radiation Act No. 5 of 1983, which created the National Radiation Commission (NRC) in 1983. The TAEC was established with additional responsibilities, including the control of the use of ionizing and non-ionizing radiation sources, as well as the promotion of safe and peaceful applications of atomic energy and nuclear technology. Additionally, TAEC regulates the safe and peaceful uses of atomic energy and promotes and expands the contribution of atomic energy and nuclear technology to health and prosperity throughout the United Republic of Tanzania. The first President of Tanzania, Mwalimu Julius Kambarage Nyerere, signed the Protection from Radiation Act on May 9, 1983, to control the use of radioactive material and for other matters connected with the protection of persons from harm resulting from ionizing radiation in the United Republic of Tanzania. This act gave the National Radiation Commission complete control over the use of radioactive materials, the installation of plants, the importation of nuclear installations, and the operation of nuclear installations.

During its early days, the NRC played a key role in coordinating the medical and industrial application of ionizing radiation by carrying out regular inspections at ionizing radiation facilities with a view to ensuring the protection of workers. students, and the general public from harm resulting from ionizing radiation. On importation of nuclear instillations, the NRC was responsible to take into consideration all applications for and granting licenses to persons intending to import or use atomic or other radioactive plants, installations and maintain a register or registers of importers, users and operators, of nuclear or other radioactive plants, installations, apparatus or other radioactive materials.

== See also ==
- Energy law
- Nuclear energy policy
