= Nakawa Division =

Administrative division of Kampala, Uganda

Coordinates: 00°20′N 32°37′E

Nakawa Division is one of the five administrative divisions of the city of Kampala, the capital and largest city of Uganda. The town of Nakawa is the site of the division headquarters.

== Location ==
Nakawa Division lies in the eastern part of the city, bordering Kira Town to the east, Wakiso District to the north, Kawempe Division to the north-west, Kampala Central Division to the west, Makindye Division across Murchison Bay to the south-west and Lake Victoria to the south. The coordinates of the division are 0°20'00.0"N, 32°37'00.0"E (Latitude:0.333333; Longitude:32.616667). Neighborhoods in the division include Bugoloobi, Bukoto, Butabika, Kiswa, Kiwaatule, Kyambogo, Kyanja, Luzira, Mbuya, Mutungo, Nabisunsa, Naguru, Nakawa, and Ntinda. The average elevation of Nakawa is about 1,083 metres (3,553 ft) above sea level.

== Overview ==
The topography of the division is characterized by flat-topped hills of uniform height divided by shallow valleys forming papyrus swamps. Most of the streams flow into Lake Victoria. The streams are characterized by low gradient and comparatively broad valley floors. Owing to alluvial aggregation, low gradient, and frequent local silting, many valley floors have become seasonal or permanent swamps. The soil geology from which the soils of the corridor formed belongs to the Basement Complex. It consists of a variety of metamorphic largely granitoid rocks, acid gneisses, schists and sand stones. Most of these rocks are highly weathered.

The meteorological data for Kampala City is typical of Nakawa Division. The division is characterized by comparatively small seasonal variations in temperature. Due to a high rate of evaporation from the lake surface and to regular winds, which drift across the lake from east to west all seasons, the average annual rainfall is high: 1,558 millimetres (61.3 in). There is a tendency of the rainfall to decrease as one moves northwards from the lake shores. The rain falls on 160 to 170 days each year, with two peaks from March to May and from October to November.

Only a small proportion of the division vegetation can be considered as natural. The vegetation of the hills, which was originally shrubs and forests, has been modified to a greater extent as a result of clearing to give way for settlement (high income residential neighborhoods on the hills) and the papyrus swamps have been encroached on, in the valleys, by illegal developers.

== Demographics ==
The 1991 national census estimated the division's population at 135,519. The 2002 census put the figure at 246,781, with 122,249 (49.5 percent) females and 124,532 (50.5 percent) males. In 2002, the division had 20.3 percent of the total Kampala District population. Children below five years of age were 20 percent of the division population. Youth aged 10 to 24 were 30 percent of the population, and 26.7 percent of the population were women of child-bearing age. The population growth rate in 2002 was 4.8 percent and the total fertility rate was 5.1 percent. The average family size was 4 and the maternal mortality rate was 265 per 100,000 live births.

According to the 2024 Uganda Population and Housing Census, Nakawa Division had a population of 428,732 residents (227,129 males and 201,603 females). The household population stood at 386,536 people living in 134,015 households, with an average household size of 2.9. Access to basic services showed that out of all households, 126,609 used improved water sources, while 7,406 relied on unimproved water. For sanitation, 111,653 households had improved sanitation, 21,669 used unimproved sanitation, and 693 households reported open defecation.

== Points of interest ==
Points of interest in Nakawa Division include the following:

- Kyambogo University
- Makerere University Business School
- Headquarters of Uganda Revenue Authority
- Headquarters of Uganda People's Defence Force (UPDF)
- Mbuya Military Hospital, a tertiary referral hospital for the UPDF
- Naguru General Hospital
- Butabika National Referral Hospital, Uganda's only psychiatric referral hospital
- Luzira Maximum Security Prison
- Nakawa Market
- Quality Chemical Industries Limited

== See also ==
- Divisions of Kampala
- Kampala Capital City Authority
- Naguru
