= Kampala Northern Bypass Highway =

Road in Uganda

Route information
- Length: 14 mi (23 km)
- History: Designated in 2004; Completion in 2022

Major junctions
- East end: Bweyogerere
- Naalya; Kisaasi; Bukoto; Bwaise; Namungoona
- West end: Busega

Location
- Country: Uganda

Highway system
- Roads in Uganda

The Kampala Northern Bypass Highway, often referred to as the Northern Bypass, is a road in Uganda. It forms a semicircle across the northern suburbs of Kampala, Uganda's capital and largest city. The road was constructed to relieve traffic congestion within the city center, allowing cross-country traffic to bypass the city's downtown area.

== Location ==
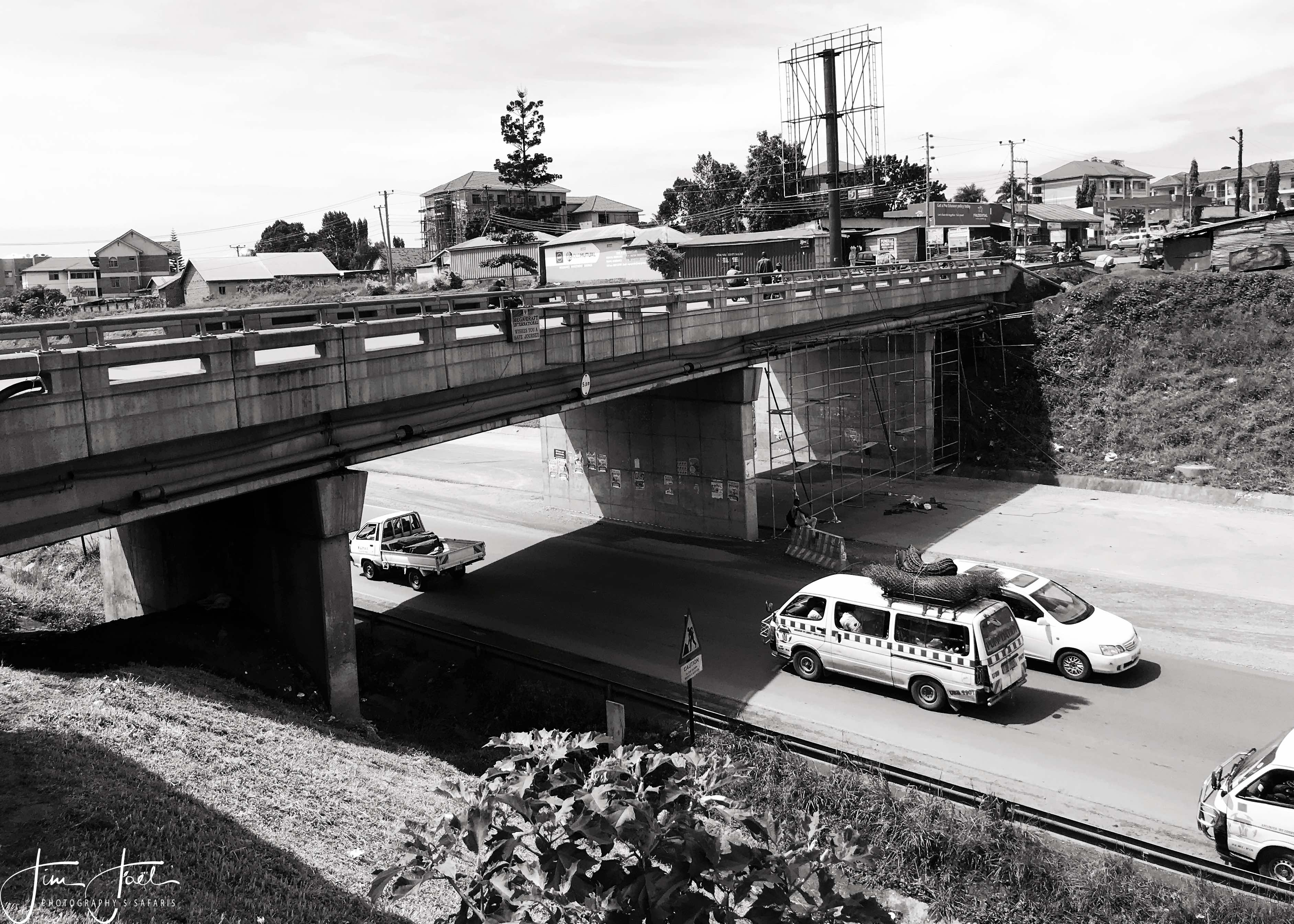
Bypass highway in Kiwaatule

The bypass stretches from Namboole, approximately 11 kilometres (7 mi) to the east of downtown Kampala.

The highway winds through the suburbs of Naalya, Kiwaatule, Kulambiro, Kigoowa, Kisaasi, Bukoto, Mulago, Makerere, Bwaise, Kawaala, and Namungoona, to end at Busega, approximately 8 kilometres (5.0 mi) west of the city. The highway measures approximately 22.5 kilometres (14 mi) in length.

== Overview ==
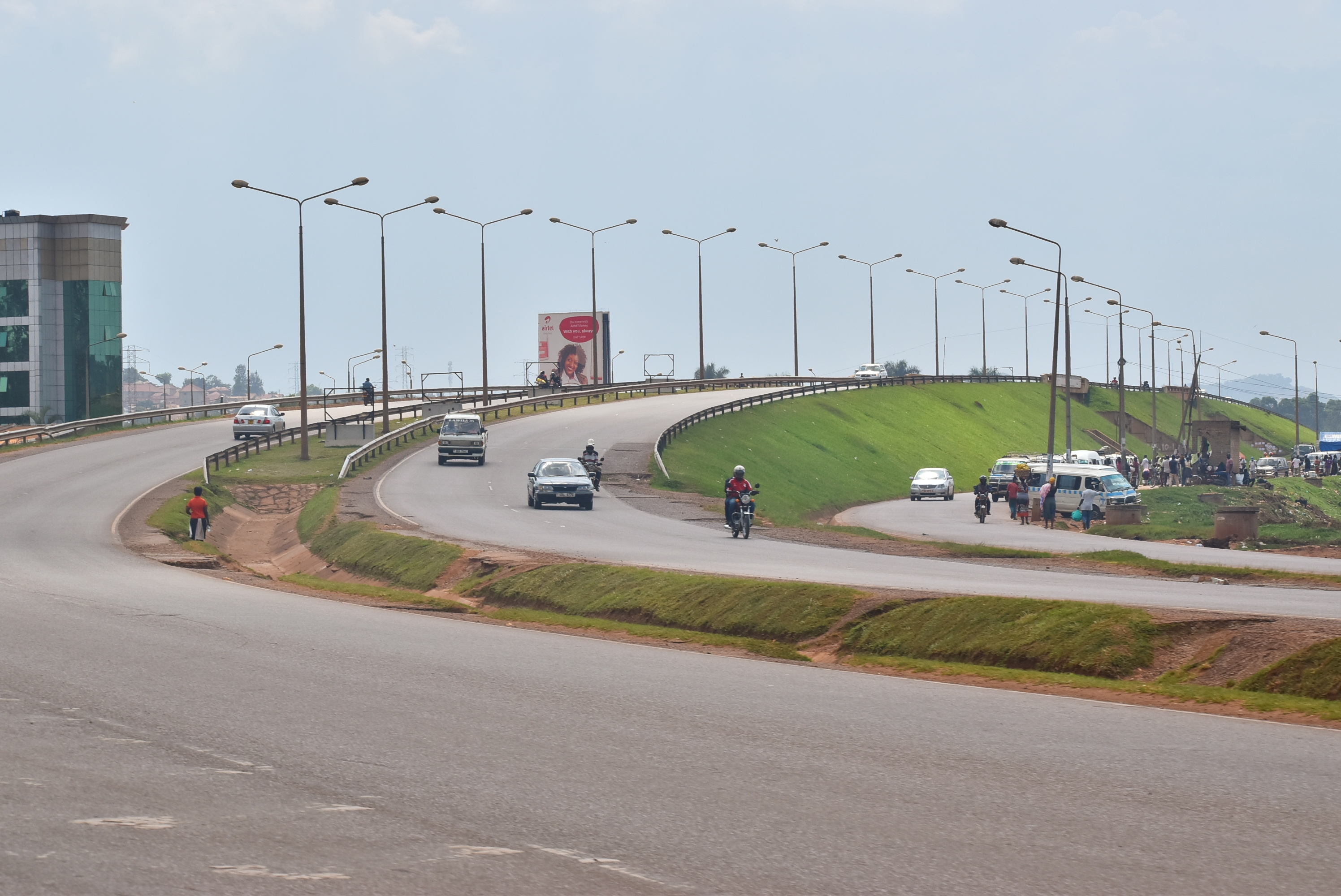
Kampala Northern Bypass Bwaise Interchange

The bypass opened to traffic on 1 October 2009. Constructed between 2004 and 2009, the bypass is about 22 kilometres (14 mi) long. The project was funded by the European Union and the Uganda government.

== Expansion ==
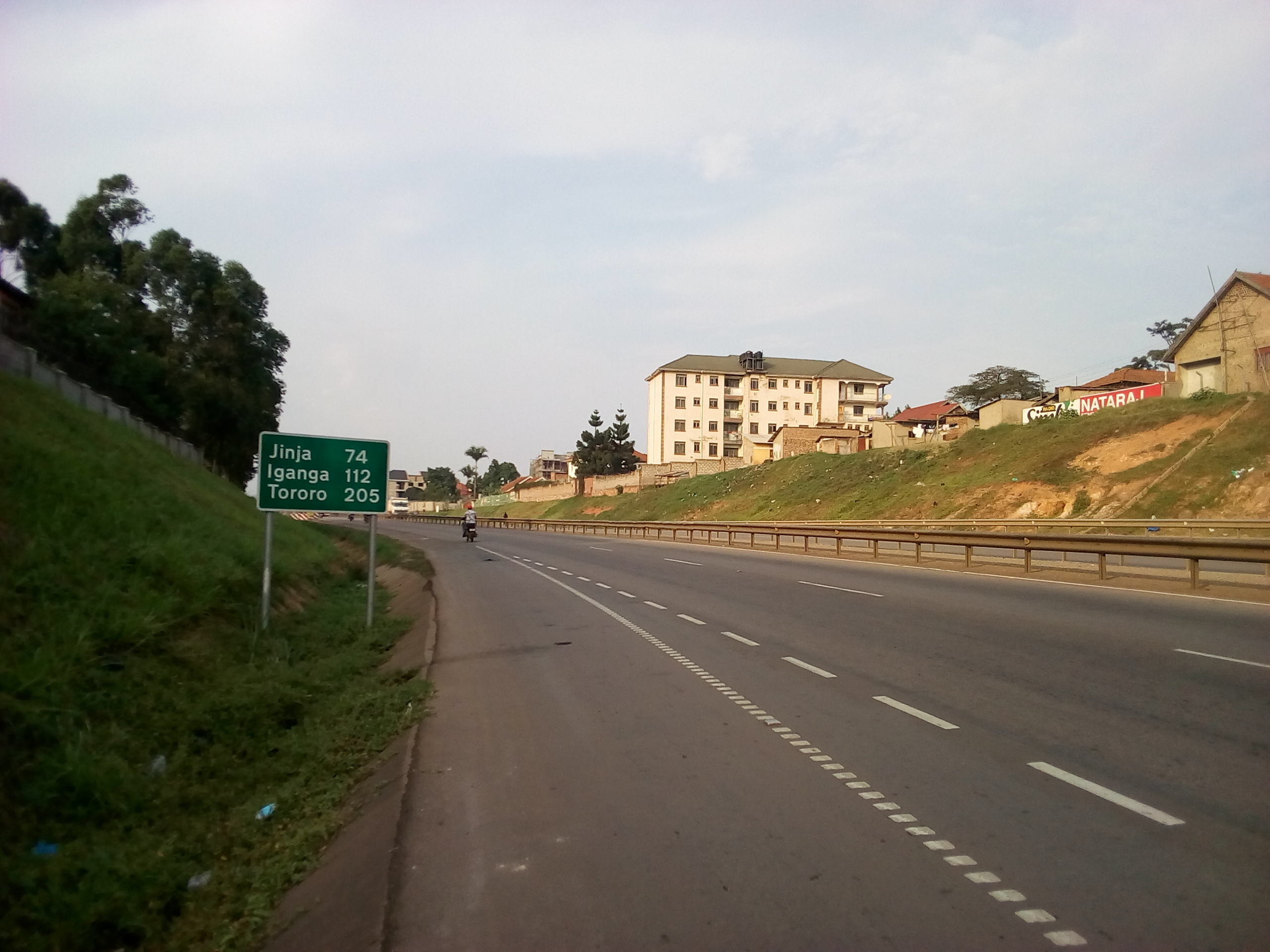
Kampala Northern Bypass Highway in Naalya, overlooking the roundabout

In August 2012, Ugandan print media reported that expansion of the bypass to dual carriageway for its entire length would begin in early 2013. Funding for the expansion is being provided by the European Investment Bank, the European Union, and the Ugandan government.

In May 2014, the Uganda National Roads Authority awarded the construction contract for the expansion to Mota-Engil, Engenharia E Construcao SA, a subsidiary of the Mota-Engil civil engineering and construction conglomerate based in Portugal. Construction was expected to start in June 2014 and last 30 months.

In October 2014, Ugandan print media reported that the start of construction had been postponed to the end of 2014 and would last approximately 30 months.

On 23 February 2015, the widening of the bypass was officially launched.

Construction costs are budgeted at €67.4 million. The breakdown of the funding sources is in the table below:

Kampala Northern Bypass extension funding
| Rank | Development partner | Contribution in Euros | Percentage | Notes |
|---|---|---|---|---|
| 1 | European Union | 37.0 million | 54.90 | Grant |
| 2 | European Investment Bank | 15.0 million | 22.25 | Loan |
| 3 | Government of Uganda | 15.4 million | 22.85 | Investment |
| | Total | 67.4 million | 100.00 | |

As of December 2018, an estimated 51 percent of the work had been completed, with completion planned in 2021. Six interchanges are planned to replace existing roundabouts at Sentema Road, Hoima Road, Gayaza Road, Bukoto/Kyebando, Ntinda/Kisaasi, and Naalya.

As of March 2020, with an estimated 70 percent of the expansion completed, completion was still planned for the 4th quarter of 2021. The delays were blamed on protracted land acquisition processes, changes in road design and increased scope of work (construction of new road interchanges).

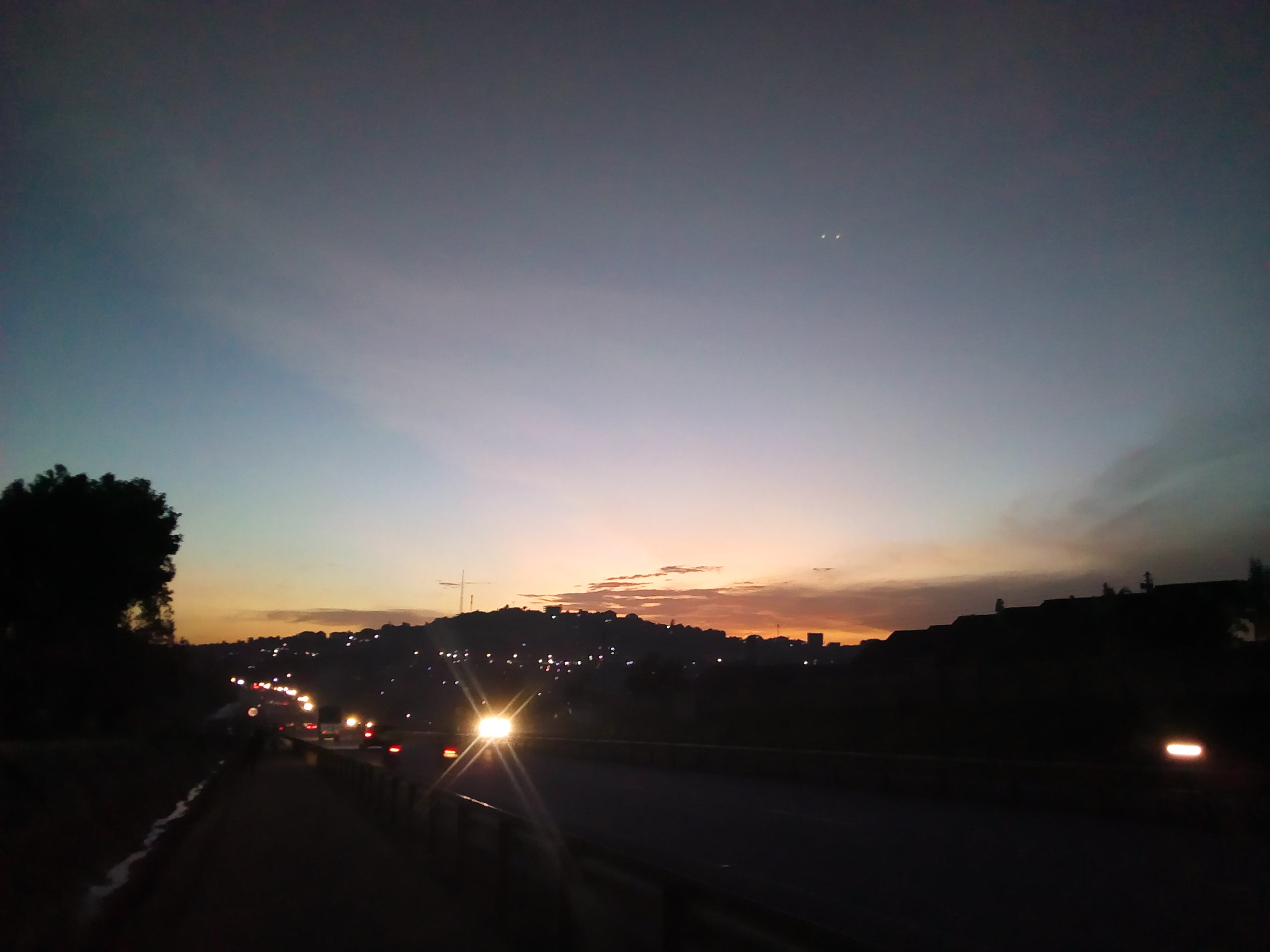
Sunset in Kiwatule along Kampala Northern Bypass

In August 2021, it was reported that work was in its final stages, with completion expected during the 4th quarter of 2021. At that time the cost of the road was reported as €106million (about UShs445 billion).

In January 2022, the completed dual carriageway road was commissioned by Jessica Alupo, the Vice President of Uganda. The highway is a component of the Northern Corridor.

== Points of interest ==
Some of the points of interest along or near the bypass include:

- Mandela National Stadium, at Bweyogerere
- Mulago Hill, the highway skirts the northern borders of the hill between Bukoto and Bwaise
- Kampala–Bombo Road crosses the Northern Bypass, at the northern end of Makerere University Campus.
- Makerere University, the road passes near the northern borders of the university campus between Bwaise and Kawaala
- Kampala–Mityana Road joins the highway at Busega where Kasumba Square Mall is located.
- Entebbe–Kampala Expressway joins the bypass highway at Busega.
- Kampala–Masaka Road is connected to the bypass highway by a short connector at Busega.

== Transport ==
In September 2022, Kalita Bus Company, a private enterprise, began public rapid bus transport service Between Bweyogerere and Busega, covering the entire length of the Northern Bypass Highway. The service began with two electric motor coaches of the Kayoola EVS variety, manufactured by Kiira Motors Corporation.

== See also ==
- Entebbe–Kampala Expressway
- Kampala–Jinja Highway
- Kampala–Jinja Expressway
