= National Housing and Construction Company =

Ugandan company

National Housing and Construction Company Limited
- Type: State enterprise
- Industry: Housing
- Founded: 1964; 62 years ago
- Headquarters: Kampala, Uganda
- Key people: Hon Sylvester Wanjuzi Wasieba (board chairperson); Eng. Kenneth Kaijuka (CEO
- Services: Construction
- Revenue: US$6 million
- Total assets: US$70 million (2011)
- Number of employees: 150 (2016)
- Website: http://www.nhcc.co.ug

National Housing and Construction Company Limited (NHCC) is a Ugandan construction and real estate management company, partly owned by the Uganda Government. The company's mandate is to increase the housing stock in the country, rehabilitate the housing industry and encourage Ugandans to own homes in an organized environment.

== History ==
NHCC was established by the National Housing Corporation Act of 1964, as a government parastatal. The Act was repealed by the 1974 Decree to form the National Housing and Construction Corporation. In July 2002, the corporation became a public limited liability company known as the National Housing and Construction Company Limited. Later, the Uganda government partially divested from NHCC by selling 49 percent shareholding to the Libyan African Investment Company, an investment company owned by the government of Libya.

== Ownership ==
As of October 2016, the shareholding in the stock of NHCC was as depicted in the table below:

National Housing and Construction Company stock ownership
Rank	Name of owner	Percentage ownership
1	Libyan African Investment Company (LAICO)	49.0
2	Government of Uganda	51.0
	Total	100.00

In August 2016, Patrick Ocailap, an official in the Ugandan Ministry of Finance, Planning and Economic Development, indicated that NHCC did not have sufficient funds to meet its obligations. New investors are needed to inject new funds to increase the company's working capital. In October 2016, the government of Uganda announced its intention to acquire 100 percent shareholding in the company.

== Asset base ==
In 2011, NHCC owned assets in excess of US$70 million, with annual turnover of US$6 million. NHCC owned 5.0% of Housing Finance Bank, Uganda's 9th largest commercial bank, as of December 2013.

== Projects as of 2016 ==
As of October 2016, the following were some of the construction and management projects that NHCC was involved in:

- Impala Housing Estate, Namungoona, Kampala. This is the fourth phase of the Namungoona development, bringing the number of planned and completed housing units to 469.
- Bukerere Housing Estate. Located in Bukerere, Mukono District, the development is planned to have between 2,000 and 3,000 housing units of three to four bedrooms each designed with an estimated built up area of 75 square metres (810 ft^{2}) to 150 square metres (1,600 ft^{2}) each. A section of this development will consist of three storey flats (condominiums) intended for upper middle class clients.
- Jasmine Apartments. These flats, each measuring 117 square metres (1,260 ft^{2}), with three bedrooms, are located in Naalya, Kira Municipality and are intermixed with retail shops and communal amenities including gardens and rooftop terraces.
- Rwizi View Estate. Located within the city centre of Mbarara, the development consists of two bedroom apartments, each measuring approximately 125.76 square metres (1,353.7 ft^{2}).
- Rwizi View Estate. Located adjacent to the two bedroom development, the three bedroom apartments have the same approximate living space of 126 square metres (1,360 ft^{2}).

== Recent developments ==
In July 2014, NHCC borrowed US$9 million from Shelter Afrique, a Nairobi-based pan-African finance institution, for the purpose of constructing more affordable housing in Uganda.

NHCC owns the twin towers known as Crested Towers in Nakasero, currently housing the headquarters of Stanbic Bank Uganda Limited and the headquarters of the European Union in Uganda, among other tenants. According to the CEO of NHCC, as of June 2016, the buildings were valued in excess of USh80 billion (approx. US$23.5 million). The rent derived from this development is worth USh13 billion (approx. US$3.82 million) every year, according to the CEO.
