= Naguru =

- village
- Interactive map of Naguru
- Location in Andhra Pradesh, India
- Country: India
- State: Andhra Pradesh

Languages
  - Official: Telugu
- Time zone: UTC+5:30 (IST)
- Vehicle registration: AP

Naguru is a village and panchayat in Garugubilli mandal in Parvathipuram Manyam district of Andhra Pradesh, India. Naguru is a small village with a population of around 5000. Most of the people are employed in cultivation and cattle. Naguru was an assembly constituency in Andhra Pradesh till restructuring in 2009. It is located on the highway connecting Parvathipuram - Srikakulam, just 17 km from Parvathipuram. One who wants to visit Naguru, has to reach Parvathipuram first via train and from there can get a bus to Naguru easily.

== Assembly constituency ==
Naguru Assembly constituency was a ST reserved constituency of the Andhra Pradesh Legislative Assembly, India. It is one of 9 constituencies in the Vizianagaram district.

List of elected members:

- 1967 - Sri Satrucharla Prathap Rudra Raju
- 1972 - Sri Vyricherla Chandra Chudamani Deo
- 1978 - Sri Satrucharla Vijaya Rama Raju, Janata Party
- 1983 - Sri Satrucharla Vijaya Rama Raju, Indian National Congress
- 1985 - Sri Satrucharla Vijaya Rama Raju, Indian National Congress
- 1989 - Sri Satrucharla Chandrasekhara Raju, Indian National Congress
- 1994 - Sri Nimmaka Jaya Raju, Telugu Desam Party
- 1999 - Sri Satrucharla Vijaya Rama Raju, Indian National Congress
- 2004 - Sri Kolaka Lakshmana Murthy, Communist Party of India (Marxist)

In 2009 this Constituency became part of Kurupam

- 2009 - Sri VeeraVara Thodarmal Janardhan Thatraj (nephew of Sri Satrucharla Chandrasekhara Raju)
- 2014 - Smt Pamula Pushpa Srivani (daughter-in-law of Sri Satrucharla Chandrasekhara Raju)
