= Mbalwa =

- Location in Uganda
- Coordinates: 00°22′13″N 32°39′23″E
- Country: Uganda
- Region: Central Region of Uganda
- District: Wakiso District
- Municipality: Kira Town
- Elevation: 1,147 m (3,763 ft)

Mbalwa is a neighborhood in Kyaliwajjala Parish, Kira Municipality, Wakiso District in the Central Region of Uganda.

== Location ==
The neighborhood is bounded by Nsawo and Bbuto to the north, Bweyogerere to the east and south-east, Kireka to the south and south-west, Naalya and Kyaliwajjala to the west and Namugongo to the northwest. Mbalwa is approximately 4.5 kilometres (3 mi), by road, southeast of Kira Town Hall. This is approximately 12 kilometres (7 mi), by road, north-east of the central business district of Kampala, the capital and largest city of Uganda. The geographical coordinates of Mbalwa are: 0°22'13.0"N, 32°39'23.0"E (Latitude:0.370278; Longitude:32.656389). Mbalwa lies at an average elevation of about 1,147 metres (3,763 ft) above sea level.

== Overview ==
Mbalwa is primarily an upscale residential neighborhood, with many of the private residences enclosed in perimeter fences and re-enforced metal gates. It is generally considered a safe neighborhood, with a neighborhood-watch system that uses online social networks. The neighborhood is accessible by foot, bicycle, boda-boda motorcycle taxi, private car, commuter taxi, and by public bus service.

== Points of interest ==
The following points of interest lie within the neighborhood or close to its boundaries: (a) the headquarters of Uganda National Bureau of Standards in Bweyogerere Industrial Park, to the immediate east of Mbalwa. (b) the eastern end of the Kampala Northern Bypass Highway, borders the southern perimeter of the Mbalwa neighborhood, separating it from Kireka and Naalya.

== See also ==
- List of cities and towns in Uganda
- Kira, Uganda
