= Kimwanyi =

- Location in Uganda
- Coordinates: 00°27′12″N 32°38′05″E
- Country: Uganda
- District: Wakiso District
- City: Kira, Uganda
- County: Kyaddondo
- Constituency: Kyaddondo East

Government
  - MP: Ibrahim Ssemujju Nganda
- Elevation: 3,786 ft (1,154 m)

Population (2014 Estimate)
  - Total: 15,700

Kimwanyi is a neighborhood in Kira Municipality, Wakiso District, in the Buganda Region of Uganda. Kimwanyi also refers to Kimwanyi Parish, in Kira sub-county, Kyaddondo County, Wakiso District. It is one of the six parishes (wards) of Kira Municicipality, namely; Kimwanyi, Kira, Kyaliwajjala, Kireka, Bweyogerere and Kirinnya.

== Location ==
Kimwanyi is in Kimwanyi Ward (Kimwanyi Parish), in northeastern Kira Municipality, Wakiso District, in Central Uganda. It is approximately 22 kilometres (14 mi), by road, north of the central business district of Kira Town. This is approximately 18 kilometres (11 mi), by road, northeast of downtown Kampala, Uganda's capital and largest city. The Kimwanyi neighborhood is bordered by Nakweero to the north, Kijabijo to the northeast, Kitukutwe to the east, Kiwologoma to the southeast, Bulindo to the south, Gayaza to the west, and Manyangwa to the northwest. The coordinates of Kimwanyi are 0°27'12.0"N, 32°38'05.0"E (Latitude:0.453336; Longitude:32.634733). Kimwanyi sits at an average elevation of 1,154 metres (3,786 ft), above sea level.

== Overview ==
Kimwanyi is a rural neighborhood. In 2001, a law was passed incorporating the village into the newly created Kira Municipality, the second-largest urban center in Uganda, with a population of 313,761 according to the 2014 national census.

The neighborhood is the location of Kimwanyi Umea Primary School, an elementary school, administered by the Uganda Muslim Community. Also located there is the Namugongo Youth and Women Development Association (YWDAN), a non-profit organization.

== Population ==
In 2002, the national census estimated the population of Kira Municipality at 142,800. Kimwanyi Parish's population at the time was about 6,800 (approximately 5% of the total). In 2014, the Uganda Bureau of Statistics (UBOS), enumerated population of Kira at 313,761. Given that data, it is estimated that the population of Kimwanyi Parish (Kimwanyi Ward) in 2014, was about 15,700.

== See also ==
- Bweyogerere
- Kirinnya
- Kireka
- Kyaliwajjala
