= Kijabijo =

- Map of Uganda showing the location of Kijabijo
- Coordinates: 00°28′34″N 32°40′01″E
- Country: Uganda
- Region: Buganda
- District: Wakiso District
- County: Kyaddondo
- Constituency: Kira Municipality
- Town: Kira Town

Government
  - Member of Parliament: Ibrahim Ssemujju Nganda
- Elevation: 1,153 m (3,783 ft)
- Time zone: UTC+3 (EAT)

Kijabijo is a neighborhood in Kira Town, in Wakiso District in the Buganda Region of Uganda.

== Location ==
Kijabijo is located in Kira Town, Kimwanyi Parish, Kira sub-county, in Kyaddondo County, in Wakiso District, approximately 15 kilometres (9 mi) northeast of downtown Kira Town, The neighborhood lies approximately 10 kilometres (6 mi), by road, east of Gayaza, the nearest large urban centre, along the all-tarmac Gayaza–Kayunga Road.

This is approximately 28 kilometres (17 mi), by road, northeast of Kampala, Uganda's capital and largest city. The coordinates of Kijabijo are 0°28'34.0"N, 32°40'01.0"E (Latitude:0.476111; Longitude:32.666944). Kijabijo is located at an average elevation of 1,153 metres (3,783 ft), above sea level.

== Overview ==
Kijabijo, was a village prior to 2001, when it was incorporated into Kira Town. The Gayaza–Kayunga Road passes through the neighborhood in a general west–to–east direction, dividing Kijabijo into North Kijabijo and South Kijabijo.

As of July 2018, Kijabijo is the location of Flametree Stables, an establishment established in 2009 on 25 acres (10 ha), by Miranda Bowser, a native of the United Kingdom. The horse farm, with about 40 animals, as of January 2016, rears horses, keeps horses for other owners, provides space for hire and offers horse riding lessons.

The Lwajjali River, which forms the border between Mukono District to the east and Wakiso District to the west, forms the eastern border of Kijabijo, and separates the neighborhood from the town of Nakasajja, in Mukono District.

== See also ==
- List of cities and towns in Uganda
