= Kigulu, Uganda =

Kigulu
- Location in Uganda; Placement on map is approximate
- Coordinates: 00°25′30″N 32°39′18″E
- Country: Uganda
- Region: Central Uganda
- District: Wakiso District
- Municipality: Kira, Uganda
- County: Kyaddondo
- Constituency: Kyaddondo East

Government
  - Mayor: Mamerito Mugerwa
  - MP: Ibrahim Semujju Nganda
- Elevation: 3,870 ft (1,180 m)

Kigulu is a neighborhood in Kira Municipality, Kyaddondo County, Wakiso District, in Central Uganda.

== Location ==
Kigulu is bordered by Kitukutwe to the north, Bukeerere, in Mukono District to the east, Nsasa to the south and Bulindo to the west. This location lies approximately 21 kilometres (13 mi), by road, northeast of Kampala, the capital of Uganda and the largest city in the country. The coordinates of Kigulu are:0° 25' 30.00"N, 32° 39' 18.00"E (Latitude:0.42500; Longitude:32.65500).

== Overview ==
Prior to 2001, Kigulu was a residential and farming village. In 2001, a law was passed, incorporating the village into the newly created Kira Municipality, the second largest urban center in Uganda, with an estimated population of about 180,000 in 2011. During the 21st century, Kigulu has developed into a middle-class residential neighbourhood, with planned housing developments and large private farms and ranches. Kigulu is connected to the national power grid administered by the power utility company called Umeme. It is also connected to the water pipeline of the National Water and Sewerage Corporation.

== Points of interest ==
These are some of the points of interest in or near Kigulu:

- Jomayi Kigulu Housing Estate - A planned residential development by Jomayi Property Consultants Limited, a private real estate development company.
- Jomayi Kira Housing Estate - Another planned residential development by Jomayi, in the nearby neighborhood called Kitikifumba.
- Shimoni Teacher Training College - A nation elementary teacher training college with attached demonstration school, also in nearby Kitikifumba.
- Akright Nsasa Housing Estate - A planned residential development by Akright Projects Limited, a private real estate development company. Housing estate located in nearby Nsasa Village.

== See also ==
- Nsasa
- Bulindo
- Kira Municipality
- Wakiso District
- Central Region, Uganda
