= Mulawa, Uganda =

Ugandan urban settlement

Mulawa
- Location in Uganda; Placement on map is approximate
- Coordinates: 00°24′42″N 32°38′38″E
- Country: Uganda
- Region: Central Uganda
- District: Wakiso District
- Municipality: Kira, Uganda
- County: Kyaddondo
- Constituency: Kira Municipality

Government
  - MP: Ibrahim Ssemujju Nganda
- Elevation: 3,900 ft (1,190 m)

Mulawa is a neighborhood in Kira Municipality, Kyaddondo County, Wakiso District, in Central Uganda.

== Location ==
Mulawa is bordered by Bulindo to the north, Nsasa to the northeast, Namugongo to the east and southeast, Downtown Kira to the south, Butenga to the southwest and Kitikifumba to the west. This location lies approximately 17 kilometres (11 mi), by road, northeast of Kampala, the capital of Uganda and the largest city in the country. The coordinates of Mulawa are:0°24'42.0"N, 32°38'38.0"E (Latitude:0.411667; Longitude:32.643889).

== Overview ==
Prior to 2001, Mulawa was a residential and farming village. In 2001, a law was passed, incorporating the village into the newly created Kira Municipality, a large urban center in Uganda, with a population of 317,157 during the 2014 national census, and an estimated population of about 434,200 in 2019.

During the 21st century, Mulawa has developed into a middle-class residential neighborhood, with planned housing developments. Many of the new housing units include high-rise apartment complexes and condominiums, as well as large upscale, gated private residencies. Mulawa is connected to the national power grid administered by the power utility company called Umeme. It is also connected to the water pipeline of the National Water and Sewerage Corporation.

In addition to the residential developments, public and private service establishments have sprung up, including schools, health clinics, gasoline service stations, grocery stores, supermarkets and hardware stores.

== Points of interest ==
These are some of the points of interest in or near Mulawa:

- Jomayi Kira Housing Estate - A planned residential development by Jomayi, in the nearby neighborhood called Kitikifumba.
- Shimoni Teacher Training College - A national elementary teacher training college with an attached demonstration school is also located near Kitikifumba.
- Akright Nsasa Housing Estate - A planned residential development by Akright Projects Limited, a private real estate development company. Housing estate located in nearby Nsasa Village.
- Makerere College School, a mixed day and residential secondary school maintains a residential campus at Mulawa.

== See also ==
- Nsasa
- Bulindo
- Kira Municipality
- Wakiso District
- Central Region, Uganda
