= Kitukutwe =

- Location in Uganda; Placement on map is approximate
- Coordinates: 00°27′00″N 32°40′12″E
- Country: Uganda
- Region: Central Uganda
- District: Wakiso District
- Municipality: Kira, Uganda
- County: Kyaddondo
- Constituency: Kyaddondo East

Government
  - Mayor: Mamerito Mugerwa
  - MP: Ibrahim Semujju Nganda
- Elevation: 3,870 ft (1,180 m)

Kitukutwe is a neighborhood in Kira Municipality, Kyaddondo County, Wakiso District, in Central Uganda.

== Location ==
Kitukutwe is bordered by Nakasajja to the north, Kasaayi (in Mukono District) to the east, and Nsasa to the south. Kigulu and Bulindo lie to the southwest, and Nakweero and Kimwanyi lie to the northwest. Kitukutwe is approximately 23.5 kilometres (14.6 mi), by road, northeast of Kampala, the capital and largest city of Uganda. The coordinates of Kitukutwe are:0° 27' 0.00"N, 32° 40' 12.00"E (Latitude:0.45000; Longitude:32.67000).

== Overview ==
Prior to 2001, Kitukutwe was a residential and farming village. In 2001, a law was passed, incorporating the village into the newly created Kira Municipality, the second largest urban center in Uganda, with a population of 313,761 according to the 2014 national census. During the 21st Century Kitukutwe has developed into a middle-class residential neighbourhood, with planned housing developments and large private farms and ranches. Kitukutwe is connected to the national power grid and to the water pipeline of the National Water and Sewerage Corporation.

== Points of interest ==
These are some of the points of interest in or near Kitukutwe:

- Riverside Acres Kitukutwe Housing Estate - A planned residential development by Riverside Acres Limited, a private real estate development company.
- Jomayi Kigulu Housing Estate - A planned residential development by Jomayi Estates Limited, a private real estate development company. Housing estate located in nearby Kigulu.
- Akright Nsasa Housing Estate - A planned residential development by Akright Projects Limited, a private real estate development company. Housing estate located in nearby Nsasa Village.

== See also ==
- Kigulu
- Nsasa
- Bulindo
- Kitikifumba
- Kira Municipality
