= Bulindo =

- Location in Uganda; Placement on map is approximate
- Coordinates: 00°25′14″N 32°38′43″E
- Country: Uganda
- Region: Central Uganda
- District: Wakiso District
- Municipality: Kira, Uganda
- County: Kyaddondo
- Constituency: Kira Municipality

Government
  - MP: Ibrahim Ssemujju Nganda
- Elevation: 3,810 ft (1,160 m)

Bulindo is a neighborhood in Kira Municipality, Kyaddondo County, Wakiso District, in the Central Region of Uganda.

== Location ==
Bulindo is bordered by Nakweero to the north, Kitukutwe to the northeast, Kigulu to the east, Mulawa to the south, Kitikifumba to the southwest, and Kazinga to the west. The neighborhood is about 3 kilometres (2 mi) north of the headquarters of Kira Town Council. This is approximately 17 kilometres (11 mi), by road, northeast of Kampala, the capital of and largest city in Uganda. The coordinates of Bulindo are 0°25'14.0"N, 32°38'43.0"E (Latitude:0.420556; Longitude:32.645278).

== Overview ==
Before 2001, Bulindo was a residential and farming village. In 2001, a law was passed incorporating the village into the newly created Kira municipality, the second largest urban center in Uganda, with an estimated population of about 180,000 in 2011. Since 2000, Bulindo has developed into a middle-class residential neighbourhood, with planned housing developments and large private farms and ranches. Bulindo is connected to the national power grid and the water pipeline of the National Water and Sewerage Corporation.

== Points of interest ==
These are some of the points of interest in or near Bulindo: (a) Bulindo Catholic Church, a place of worship affiliated with the Roman Catholic Church, (b) Shimoni Teacher Training College, a national elementary teacher training college with attached demonstration school, sitting on 25 acres (10 ha) in nearby Kitikifumba. The Kira-Nakweero road passes through Bulindo in a general north to south direction.

== See also ==
- Nsasa
