= Lubega =

Lubega is an Ugandan surname of Bantu origin and may refer to:

- Aisha Lubega, Ugandan teacher
- Bonnie Lubega (born 1929), Ugandan novelist
- David Lubega (born 1975), better known as Lou Bega, German singer and songwriter
- Drake Lubega, Ugandan businessman
- Edrisa Lubega (born 1998), Ugandan footballer
- Florence Alice Lubega (1917–2021), Ugandan politician
- Joseph Lubega (born 1982), Ugandan boxer
