= Sonde, Uganda =

Sonde
- Map of Uganda showing the location of Sonde.
- Coordinates: 00°23′42″N 32°41′12″E
- Country: Uganda
- District: Mukono District

Government
  - Village Chairman (LC1): Abubaker Yawe
- Elevation: 1,120 m (3,670 ft)
- Time zone: UTC+3 (EAT)

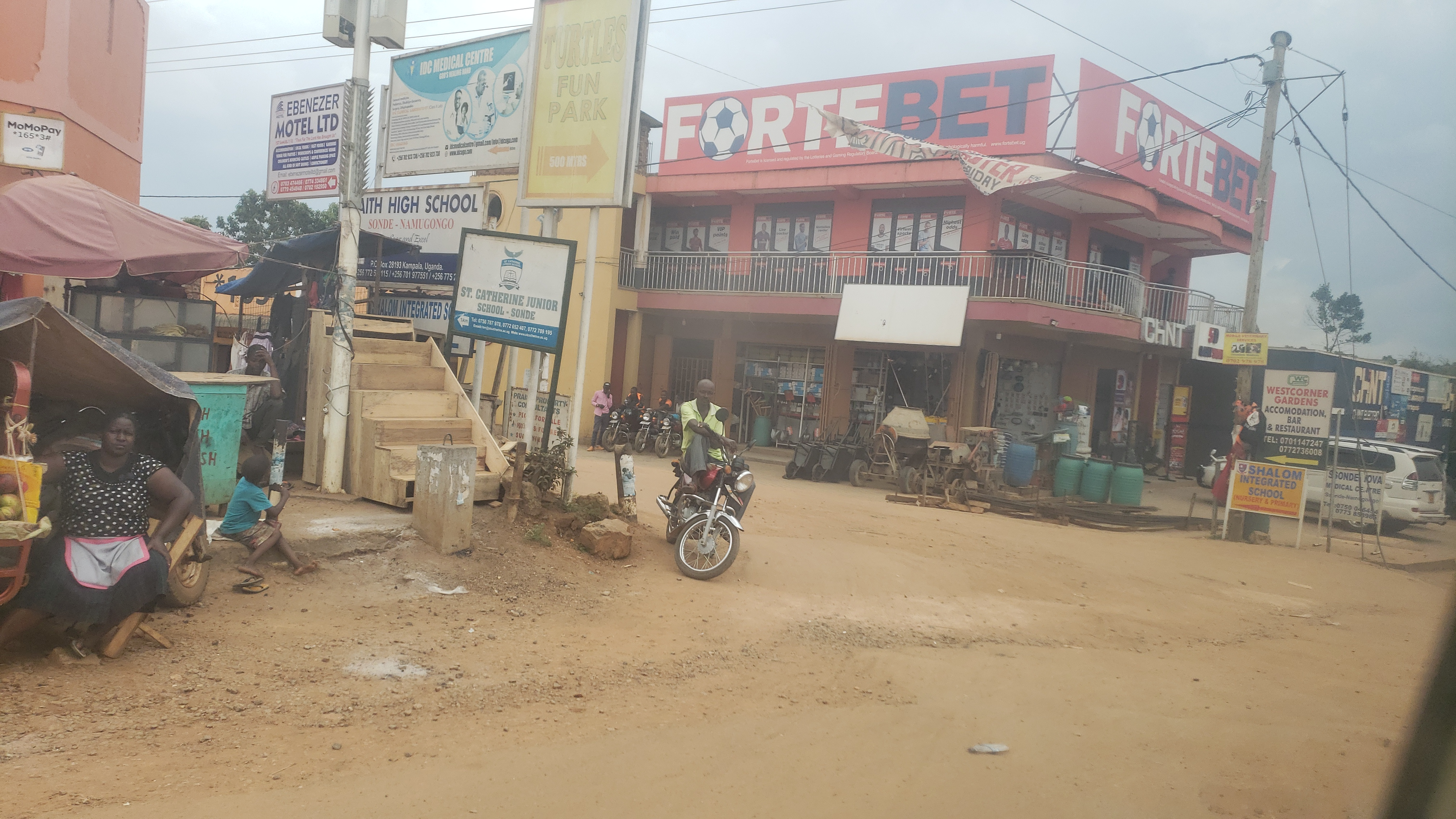
A street in Sonde

Sonde, also Ssonde, is a settlement in Mukono District, in Uganda's Central Region.

== Location ==
Sonde lies in Misindye Parish, Goma Sub-county, Mukono District, approximately 17 kilometres (11 mi), northeast of Kampala, Uganda's capital city.

Sonde is bordered by Nabusugwe to the north, Bukeerere to the east, Namanve to the south and Namugongo to the west. Its geographical coordinates are:0°23'42.0"N, 32°41'12.0"E (Latitude:0.395000; Longitude:32.686667).

== Overview ==
Previously regarded as "remote", the village began to receive new settlers, following the end of the Ugandan Bush War (1981 - 1986).

In the 2000s, the area has become popular with developers of residential housing estates. The developers buy large chunks of land, subdivide them and build individual houses for sale. The popularity of Sonde increased in popularity when National Water and Sewerage Corporation (NWSC) extended its services to the area, circa 2012.

In 2016, the road between Namugongo to the west and Seeta to the east as tarmacked, easing transportation and reducing the dusty environment.

== Points of interest ==
The following points of interest are found in Sonde or near its boundaries:

1. Namugongo–Seeta Road passes through the town in a general west to east direction.

2. Development Microfinance, a local financial services provider, offers savings opportunities and reasonably priced loans.

3. St. Michael High School and Faith High School are among of the five secondary schools, in addition to about 10 elementary and nursery schools.

4. Nakiyanja River, with the surrounding Nakiyanja wetland lie immediately west of Sonde and separate it from Namugongo.

5. Stod Villas Africa- A Villa franchise in 5 African countries including Uganda

6. Martyrs View Estate Sonde, a two minute drive west of Sonde town, estate overlooking the Church of Uganda Martyrs' Shrine at Namugongo.

== See also ==
- Bweyogerere
- Mukono
