= Shimoni Primary Teachers College =

- Type: Public
- Established: 1952
- Affiliations: Shimoni Demonstration School
- Students: 450+
- Location: Kitikifumba, Kira Town, Wakiso District, Uganda; 0°25′24″N 32°37′57″E
- Campus: Urban, 25 acres (10 ha)

Shimoni Primary Teachers College (SPTC) is a public college that trains primary school teachers in Uganda. The college has an attached primary school, Shimoni Demonstration School, where the trainee teachers practice and sharpen their teaching skills.

== Location ==
The college is located in a neighborhood called Kitikifumba, in Kira Municipality, in Wakiso District, in the Central Region of Uganda. This location is approximately 19 kilometres (12 mi), by road, north-east of Kampala, the capital and largest city of Uganda. The geographical coordinates of the teachers college are:0°25'24.0"N, 32°37'57.0"E (Latitude:0.423333; Longitude:32.632500).

== History ==
The college and demonstration school were started by Ugandan Asians in 1952. In 2006, the college was temporarily relocated to Mbale, approximately 222 kilometres (138 mi), by road, east of Kampala, and the demonstration school temporarily relocated to Kololo Primary School in Kampala.

The 15 acres (6.1 ha) piece of land in the city center, where the institution was originally housed, was leased to an investor, who started to erect Kampala Intercontinental Hotel on the site. The government of Uganda acquired 25 acres (10 ha) in Kitifumba, where it constructed a new college at an estimated cost of US$4 million (UGX:8 billion at that time), with capacity of 450 student-teachers. During the construction, the Shimoni student-teachers were accommodated at Nyondo Teacher Training College in Mbale. The teacher training college opened in January 2011.

In January 2018, the construction of the new Shimoni Demonstration School in Kitikifumba was completed and the school was opened.
