= Mahathi Fuel Transport and Storage Depot =

Fuel storage depot in Uganda

- Interactive map of Mahathi Fuel Transport and Storage Depot

Location
- Country: Uganda
- Location: Bugiri - Bukasa Village, Wakiso District
- Coordinates: 00°07′23″N 32°34′10″E

Details
- Opened: 30 December 2022; 3 years ago
- Owned by: Mahathi Infra Uganda Limited
- Type of harbour: Natural/Artificial

Mahathi Fuel Transport and Storage Depot is a privately owned inland, lakeside fuel transport and storage depot in Uganda. Gasoline, kerosene, diesel-fuel and Jet A1 are delivered by ship from Kisumu, across Lake Victoria in neighboring Kenya. The fuel is stored here and conveyed by truck to final destinations in Uganda, the Democratic Republic of the Congo, Rwanda, Burundi and South Sudan, significantly cutting down delivery times and transport costs.

== Location ==
The facility is located along the north-eastern shores of Lake Nalubaale, on approximately 30 acres (12 ha), in the neighborhood of Bugiri-Bukasa in Wakiso District, off of Kampala–Entebbe Road, approximately 36 kilometres (22 mi), by road, south of the central business district of Kampala, the capital and largest city of Uganda. This is approximately 24 kilometres (15 mi), by road, north-east of Entebbe International Airport. The geographical coordinates of Mahathi Fuel Transport and Storage Depot are 00°07'23.0"N, 32°34'10.0"E (Latitude:0.123056; Longitude:32.569444).

== Overview ==
The facility is owned by a consortium, comprising (a) Mahathi Infra Group of India (b) Siginon Group of Kenya and (c) Fortune Energy of Uganda. This consortium has registered a special purpose vehicle (SPV) company to carry out the project. The SPV company is called Mahathi Infra Uganda Limited (MIUL).

The depot has 14 storage tanks with capacity to hold 70,000,000 liters (15,397,847 imp gal; 18,492,044 U.S. gal) of fuel. This allows plenty of room to trade in fuel among the destination countries, considering that Uganda uses only 4,500,000 liters (989,862 imp gal; 1,188,774 U.S. gal) of fuel daily. Major oil companies in the region, including Shell Oil, Total SE and Mogas, have signed supply contracts with Mahathi Infra Uganda Limited.

In addition to the storage tanks, Uganda's part of the project involves the construction of a 220-metre-long jetty including four dedicated pipelines, one each for the four refined petroleum types. Also, facilities for berthing of oil tankers and construction of four self-propelling oil tanker barges, each with capacity of 4,400,000 litres (967,865 imp gal; 1,162,357 US gal), are part of the project. Each tanker barge has capacity equivalent to about 150 fuel trucks.

== Costs and funding ==
The total cost of the project is budgeted at US$270 million. Of the total, US$70 million was borrowed from Equity Group. The remaining US$200 million was raised by the consortium member companies.

== Construction ==
Construction began in 2017. As of September 2020, works were 80 percent complete, with commissioning expected in the first half of 2021. As of October 2021, construction was nearly complete, with commercial commissioning anticipated in December 2021.

In January 2022, the New Vision newspaper reported that commercial operations were planned to begin in March 2022. Construction was completed in 2022 and the first shipment of fuel was received at the facility on 30 December 2022.

== Developments ==
In August 2023 Mahathi Infra Uganda Limited secured funding from Africa Finance Corporation, in form of a loan amounting to US$95.25 million (USh353 billion) for the purpose of acquiring new infrastructure and expansion of this fuel depot.

With the funding, MIUL plans to carry out the following:

- Construct two new barges that will deliver fuel from Kisumu, Kenya, across Lake Victoria to Uganda
- Construct loading bays for 20 fuel trucks
- Construct a parking lot that can accommodate 50 fuel trucks.

Earlier in 2023, the company had indicated intention to lay a refined fuel pipeline between Uganda and Rwanda to carry refined fuel to the latter. This will ease congestion, wear and tear on Ugandan roads.

== See also ==
- Bukasa Inland Port
