= Moses Kizza Musaazi =

Ugandan engineer, inventor and academic

- Born: Uganda
- Died: 18 September 2018
- Education: MSc, University of London MPhil; Imperial College London; PhD, Imperial College London
- Occupations: Engineer, inventor, academic
- Employer: Makerere University
- Known for: Development of MakaPads
- Title: Lecturer in Engineering
- Awards: Presidential Scientific Innovation Excellence Award (2006); Mashariki Innovations in Local Government Award Programme (2006); African Initiative Grant (2012); Empowering people Award – Second Prize (2013)

Moses Kizza Musaazi was a Ugandan engineer, inventor, and academic at Makerere University. He was known for developing MakaPads, a low-cost sanitary pad made primarily from papyrus and recycled paper materials.

== Early life and education ==
Moses was appointed a Tutorial Fellow in the Faculty of Technology at Makerere University on 25 April 1975. Shortly after, in 1975, he enrolled in a one-year course in Control Systems at Imperial College London under an Africa Educational Trust scholarship from October 1976 to October 1977. He was awarded a Master of Science degree from the University of London on 25 January 1978 after completing this program. Moses later received a UNESCO scholarship for further research at Imperial College London, leading to a Master of Philosophy and a PhD, which he completed in 1985. Following his postgraduate studies, he returned to Makerere University to continue his academic career.

== Career ==
Moses was a lecturer at Makerere University as lecturer in engineering where his academic work focused on appropriate technology and practical engineering solutions designed to address local socio-economic challenges. He was also a managing director of Technology for Tomorrow Limited in Kawempe, Kampala.

== Awards and recognitions ==
- In 2006, Dr. Musaazi received the Presidential Scientific Innovation Excellence Award in Uganda for his research and its societal impact. He also won the Mashariki Innovations in Local Government Award Programme (MILGAP) organized by UN‑Habitat that year.
- In 2012, he was awarded an African Initiative Grant worth CAD 10,000 for his work on locally appropriate technologies.
- His MakaPads innovation won second prize (€30,000) at the empowering people. Award hosted by the Siemens Stiftung in 2013, a global competition for practical technologies that address basic needs.
- In 2015, he was appointed by the Royal Academy of Engineering as a judge for the inaugural Africa Prize for Engineering Innovation, recognizing his expertise in engineering innovation.

== Death ==
Dr. Moses died on 18 September 2018. He succumbed to lung cancer and passed away at Doctors Hospital in Sseguku, Wakiso District, Uganda, after collapsing at home earlier that day.
