= James Nkamwesiga Kasigwa =

- Other name: James N. Kasigwa
- Citizenship: Ugandan
- Education: Makerere University; London South Bank University; Eastern and Southern African Management Institute
- Occupations: Electrical engineer, public-sector administrator
- Employer: Uganda National Bureau of Standards
- Organizations: Uganda National Bureau of Standards
- Known for: Executive Director of the Uganda National Bureau of Standards
- Title: Executive Director
- Predecessor: David Livingstone Ebiru
- Board member of: International Organization for Standardization (ISO) Council

James Nkamwesiga Kasigwa also known as James N. Kasigwa is a Ugandan electrical engineer, technology and public-sector administrator who serves as the Executive Director of the Uganda National Bureau of Standards (UNBS).

== Education background ==
Kasigwa holds a Bachelor of Science in Electrical Engineering from Makerere University, a bachelor's degree in Computer Engineering, a Master of Science in Telecommunication from London South Bank University in the United Kingdom, and a Master of Business Administration from ESAMI.

== Career ==
Kasigwa is an electrical engineer who served as a lecturer at Makerere University’s School of Postgraduate Studies, Faculty of Computing and Information Technology from 2004 to 2007. From 2007 to 2009, he worked with a multinational telecommunications operator and later, he joined the Ministry of Information and Communications Technology, where he served as Chairman of the Multisector Working Group on ICT and Climate Change.

He later served as the Commissioner for ICT Infrastructure Development at the Ministry of ICT and National Guidance before serving as Director of Science, Technology, Innovation Regulation and Biosafety at the Ministry of Science, Technology and Innovation. Kasigwa is also a secretary to Uganda's 10th National Standards Council and also served as Uganda’s representative to the International Telecommunication Union (ITU).

On 13 May 2024, Minister of Trade, Industry and Cooperatives Francis Mwebesa appointed Kasigwa as the Executive Director of UNBS and on 9 October 2025, he was elected to the Council of the International Organization for Standardization (ISO) for the 2026–2028 term. Kasigwa is a member of Rotary International, Muyenga Tank Hill Club.

In addition, he was the chairman of the Senior Officials of the Association for the Development of Education in Africa (ADEA) and National Chairman of Uganda Scientists, Researchers & Allied Workers Union. Kasigwa was also the Chairman of the Special Technical Committee on Education, Science and Technology (STCEST) of the African Union.

Kasigwa was the co-chair of the AU-EU High Level Policy Dialogue (HLPD) on Science, Technology & Innovation and he also served as the National Coordinator of the Uganda National Space Science & Technology Program and the National Development goals. Further more, he is the founding Member of the African Development Satellite (AfDevSat) Project and also a founding Member and Vice President, ISACA Kampala Chapter (2009-2011).

== See also ==
- Rosemary Kisembo
- Andrew Kitaka
- Ssebugga Kimeze
