= Kirinnya =

Neighborhood in Kira Town, Uganda

- Location in Uganda
- Coordinates: 00°19′55″N 32°40′09″E
- Country: Uganda
- District: Wakiso District
- City: Kira, Uganda
- County: Kyaddondo
- Constituency: Kyaddondo East

Government
  - Member of parliament: Ibrahim Semujju Nganda
- Elevation: 3,810 ft (1,160 m)

Kirinnya, is one of the six administrative wards in Kira Municipality in Wakiso District in the Central Region of Uganda.

== Location ==
Kirinnya is located in Kirinnya Ward in south-eastern Kira Municipality. Kirinnya is approximately 13 kilometres (8 mi), by road, east of downtown Kampala, Uganda's capital and largest city. Kirinnya is bordered by Bweyogerere to the north, Namanve to the north-east, Namilyango to the east, Murchison Bay to the south, and Butabika to the west and north-west. The coordinates of Kirinnya are 0°19'55.0"N, 32°40'09.0"E (Latitude:0.331944; Longitude:32.669167).

== Overview ==
Kirinnya is a middle-class residential neighborhood. In between the residential dwellings, are schools, churches, soccer fields, shops and supermarkets. The Member of Parliament in the 10th Parliament (2061 to 2021) and the 11th Parliament (2021 to 2026), for Kira Municipality, (which includes Kirinnya) maintains his home in Kirinnya.

== Points of interest ==
1. Kirinnya Housing Estate: A development by Akright Projects Limited, the largest indigenous real estate developer in Uganda. It consists of about 150 bungalows in a gated planned community.

2. St. Luke's Catholic Church

3. Kirinnya Seventh Day Adventist Church

4. St. John's Church, Kirinnya Parish: A place of worship affiliated with the Church of Uganda

5. St. John's Primary School - Affiliated with St. John's Church of Uganda.

6. Maama Manjeri Boarding Primary School.

7. Bukasa Inland Port: Approximately 7 kilometres (4 mi), south of Kirinnya, on the northern shores of Lake Nalubaale, is the site where Bukasa Inland Port is being developed.
