= Kireka =

kireka
- Kireka
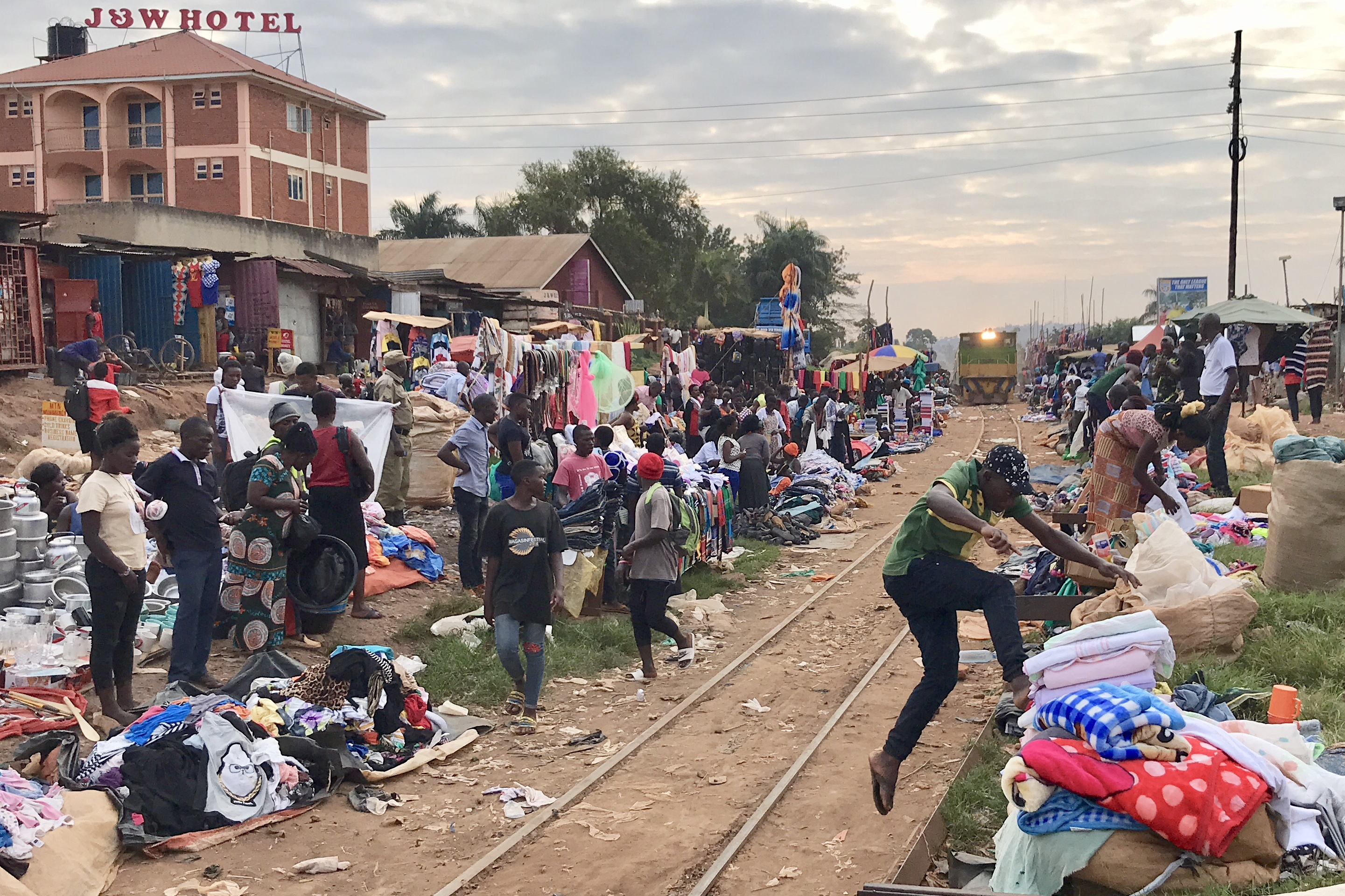
- Kireka halt in Kampala

- Location of Kireka in Uganda
- Coordinates: 00°20′48″N 32°39′00″E
- Country: Uganda
- District: Wakiso District
- Municipality: Kira Municipality
- Elevation: 4,200 ft (1,280 m)

Population (2011 Estimate)
  - Total: 69,000

Kireka is a township in Central Uganda. It is one of the six townships or Wards that constitute Kira Municipality in Wakiso District. The other five Wards in Kira Municipality are Bweyogerere Ward, Kimwaanyi Ward, Kira Ward, Kirinnya Ward and Kyaliwajjala Ward.

== Location ==
The township is bordered by Kyaliwajjala to the north, Bweyogerere to the east, Kirinnya to the south, Banda to the west, Kyambogo and Naalya to the northwest. Kireka is situated on the Kampala-Jinja Highway, approximately 11 kilometres (6.8 mi), east of Kampala, Uganda's capital and largest city. The coordinates of the township are:00 20 48N, 32 39 00E (Latitude:0.346667; Longitude:32.650000).

== Overview ==
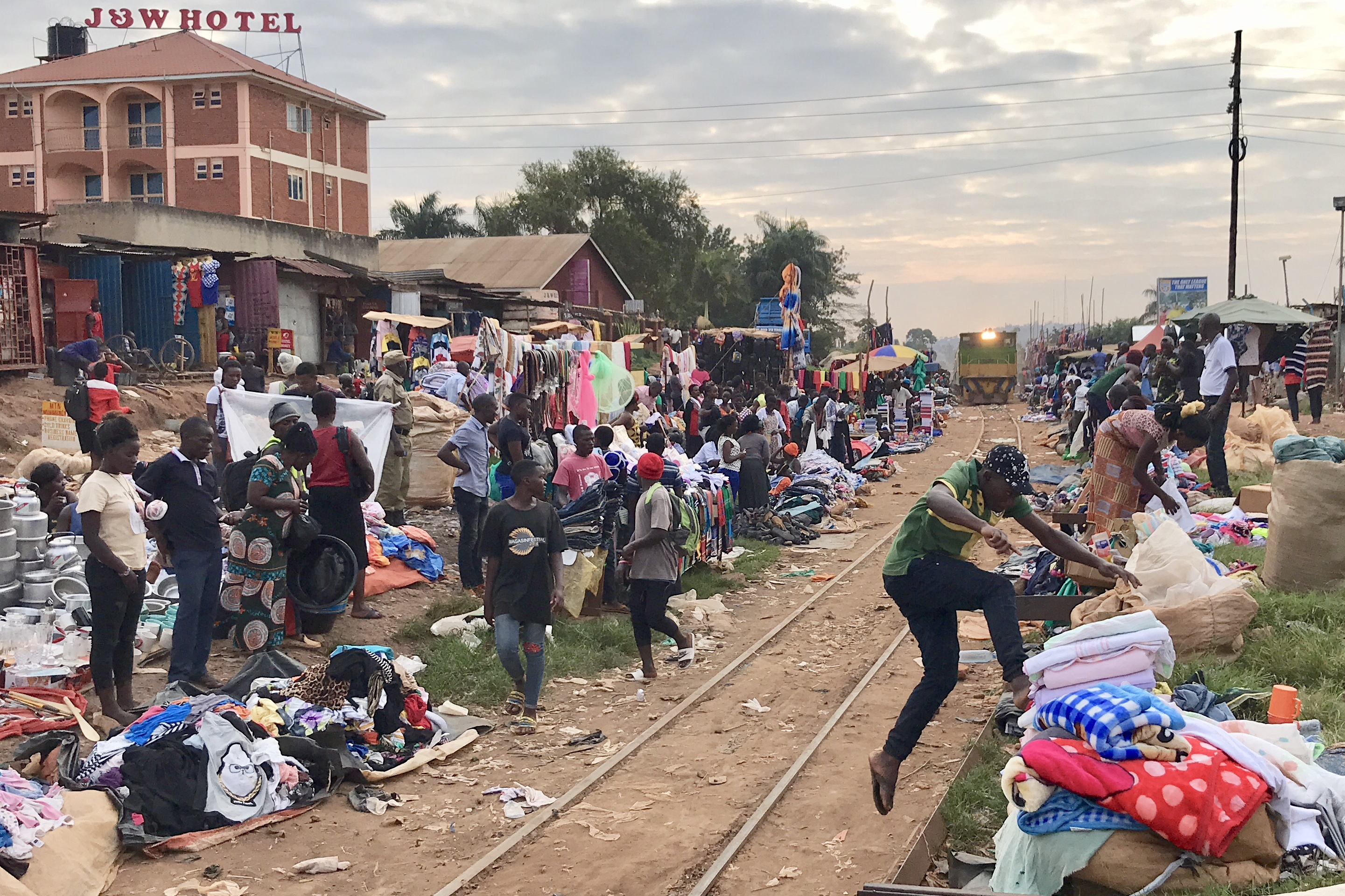
Traders make way for train arrival

Kireka is a busy township that grew out of a shopping center in the 1950s and 1960s. It is predominantly a working class city suburb with shops, restaurants, Internet cafes, banks, several gas stations and a post office. There is a large central market where farmers bring their produce to sell to the city folk.

== Population ==
During the 2002 national census, Kireka, at about 54,000 people, comprised 38.4% of the population of Kira Municipality. In 2011, the Uganda Bureau of Statistics (UBOS), estimated the population of Kira Municipality of which Kireka is a part, at 179,800. Therefore, it is estimated that in 2011, the population of Kireka Township was approximately 68,000.

== Points of interest ==
The neighborhood of Kireka contains the following points of interest:

- The Kireka-Namugongo Road - The road to the Uganda Martyrs' Basilica at Namugongo leaves the Kampala-Jinja Highway at Kireka
- A palace of Kabaka Ronald Muwenda Mutebi II; the Kireka Palace
- Mandela National Stadium, the largest sports stadium in Uganda, with a maximum capacity of 45,000, lies in the neighboring neighborhood of Bweyogerere
- Kireka Central Market

== See also ==
- Kira
- Kabaka Mutebi II
- Jinja Highway
- Wakiso District
- Central Uganda
