= DJ Mavious =

Ugandan musician

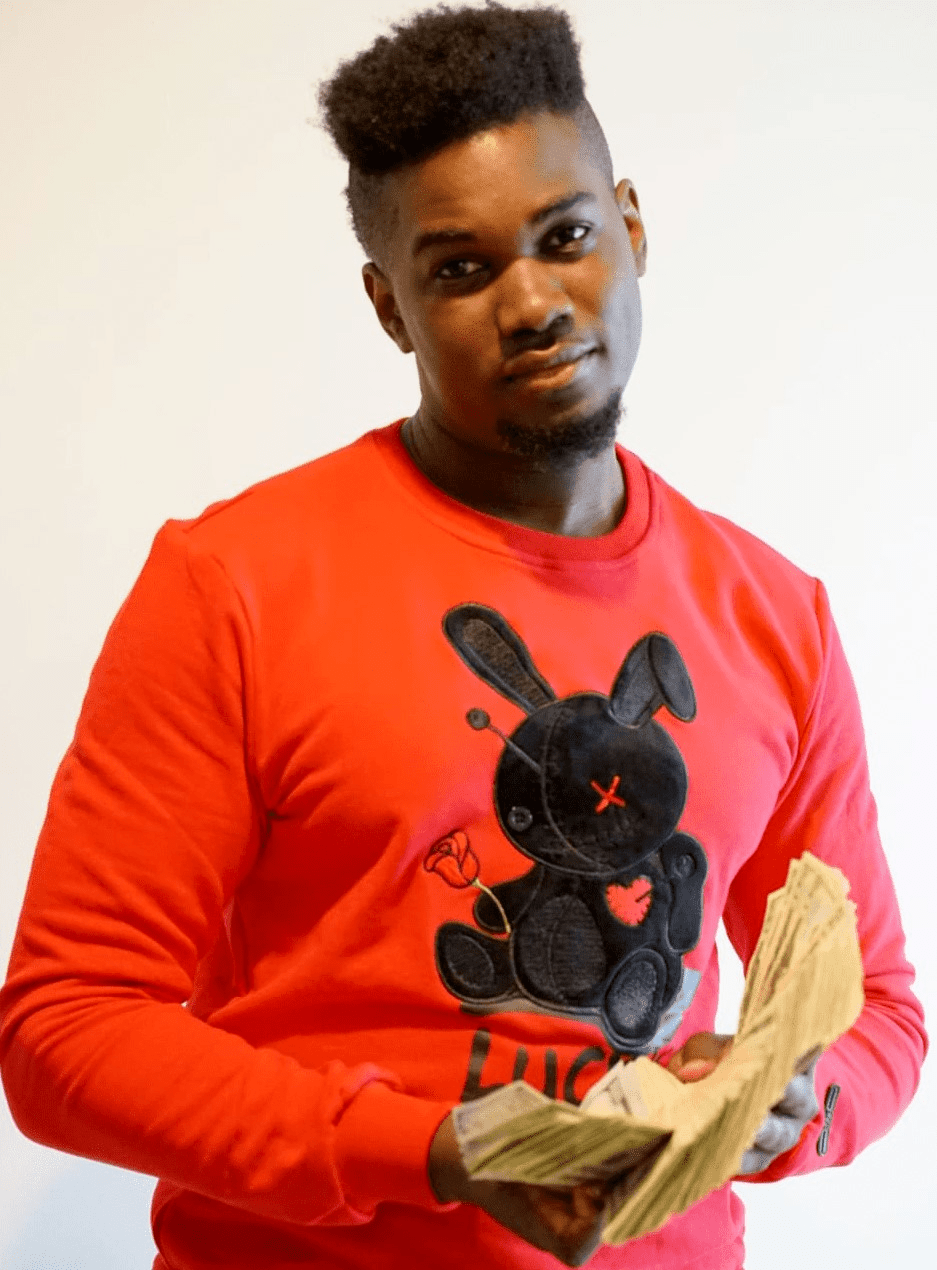
- DJ Mavious in 2021
- Born: Enock Mukiibi; 6 June 1991 (age 34); Uganda
- Education: Hilltop Academy
- Alma mater: Shimoni Demonstration School
- Occupations: Musician, Singer, songwriter
- Musical career
- Genres: Dancehall; Reggae *Urban Rnb
- Years active: 2018–present
- Label: Omwana W`eka Records

Enock Mukiibi (born 6 June 1991) commonly known as DJ Mavious (Omwana w’eka) is a Ugandan born-USA based songwriter, musician and DJ.

== Career ==
At the age of 14, Enock ventured into the music industry as a DJ at several house parties and functions in the USA at the start of his music career. In 2018 he started songwriting and singing where he is popularly known for his songs such as Bantuma, Kakuba, and Boss among others.

== Discography ==
- Boss 2019
- Tinder 2019
- Kaloosa 2019
- Slow wine 2020
- Bantuma 2020
- Kakuba 2021
- Everyday 2021

== Personal life ==
DJ Mavious was born in Kampala. He studied at Hilltop Academy, Shimoni Demonstration School but was later taken to the USA at the age of 14
