= Kitikifumba =

- Location in Uganda (Placement on map is approximate)
- Coordinates: 00°25′14″N 32°38′05″E
- Country: Uganda
- Region: Central Region
- District: Wakiso District
- Municipality: Kira, Uganda
- County: Kyaddondo
- Constituency: Kira Municipality

Government
  - Mayor: Julius Mutebi
  - MP: Ibrahim Ssemujju Nganda
- Elevation: 1,160 m (3,810 ft)

Kitikifumba is a neighborhood in Kira Municipality, Kyaddondo County, Wakiso District, in the Central Region of Uganda.

== Location ==
Kitikifumba is bordered by Bulindo to the east, Mulawa to the southeast, downtown Kira to the south, the village of Seeta to the west, Namavundu to the north-west, and Kitukutwe to the north. This is approximately 3.5 kilometres (2 mi), by road, northwest of downtown Kira, where the town council offices are located. Kitikifumba is approximately 17 kilometres (11 mi), by road, north-east of Kampala, the capital and largest city of Uganda. The coordinates of Kitikifumba are 0°25'14.0"N, 32°38'05.0"E (Latitude:0.420556; Longitude:32.634722).

== Overview ==
Up until the 1990s, Kitikifumba and neighboring Bulindo were villages with scattered low income residences and subsistence farms. In 2001, the village was incorporated into Kira Town, the second-largest urban center in Uganda with a population of 313,761, according to the August 2014 national census. During the 21st century, it has developed into an upper middle-class residential neighborhood with scattered business locations among the residences.

In 2011, the government opened the Shimoni Primary Teachers College, which had been relocated from Kampala. The college, built at an estimated cost of US$4 million (UGX:8 billion at that time), has a capacity of 450 student-teachers. During the construction, the Shimoni student-teachers were accommodated at Nyondo Teacher Training College in Mbale. The teacher training college opened in January 2011.

In January 2018, Shimoni Demonstration School, the teaching school for the Shimoni Primary Teachers College, was opened at Kitikifumba, adjacent to the college.

== See also ==
- Kigulu
- Nsasa
- Kasangati
