= Mailo =

Ugandan form of land tenure

Mailo is a unique form of land tenure in Uganda. Around 9 per cent of the country's land is held under the mailo system, which is similar to freehold. It was set up by the 1900 Buganda Agreement. Idi Amin then made all land publicly owned, and the 1995 Constitution of Uganda reintroduced mailo.

== History ==
In the 1900 Buganda Agreement, the Uganda Protectorate (part of the British Empire) granted the Buganda Kingdom land because it had helped the colonisers conquer the country. The Bugandan aristocratic class was awarded land parcels broken up into plots of square miles, hence the name "mailo". These parcels came with farmers in situ, therefore the mailo system produced private owners for customary land, whilst the tenants continued to work the land. In 1928, amendments were made to give the tenants more rights.

After the 1971 Ugandan coup d'état, all land was made publicly owned following Idi Amin's 1975 Land Reform Decree. In theory this destroyed the mailo system, although little was done in practice. Under the 1995 Constitution of Uganda, mailo was reintroduced and land can have four forms of ownership: mailo (official or private), customary, freehold or leasehold. Tenant rights were then boosted by the 1998 Land Act and its 2010 amendment.

Mailo ownership of registered land means holding title to it in perpetuity and thus it is similar to freehold. Mailo exists in western and central Uganda, with an estimated 9 per cent of the land mass being owned in this way. The mailo system is unique to Uganda. The Kabaka Mailo was land given to the king which is now owned by the Buganda Land Board. Official Mailo was land given to certain officials and it is now also owned by the Buganda Land Board. Private Mailo was land given to around 1,300 people and institutions such as churches between 1900 and 1908. This land is still owned privately, complete with longstanding tenants, and confusion over the differences between owner and tenant rights has led to conflicts. Bukerere is one place where land is still owned by mailo.
