= Electoral Commission of Uganda =

Constitutional body of the Government of Uganda incharge of elections

Electoral Commission
Agency overview
- Formed: 1997; 29 years ago
- Jurisdiction: Uganda
- Headquarters: Kampala
- Agency executive: Justice Simon Mugenyi Byabakama, Chair
- Website: Homepage

The Electoral Commission of Uganda, also Uganda Electoral Commission, is a constitutionally established organ of the Government of Uganda, whose mandate is to "organise and conduct regular, free and fair elections" in the country, in an efficient, professional and impartial manner.

== Location ==
In 2025, the commission moved to Lwez-Lubowa, Makindye Ssabagabo Municipal Council in Wakiso District. It was formerly located in 55 Jinja Road, in the Central Division of Kampala.

== History ==
The law that led to establishment of the electoral commission was promulgated in 1997. The first Electoral commission served from 1997 until 2002. The current commission came into office in 2016 for a seven-year term, renewable once only. This commission headed by Justice of the High Court, Justice Simon Mugenyi Byabakama, replaces that which was headed by Engineer Badru Kiggundu that served two terms (2002–2009 and 2009–2016). Other commissioners include Hajjat Aisha Lubega (vice chairperson) and commissioners Peter Emorut, Steven Tashobya, Justine Ahabwe Mugabi, Nathaline Etomaru and Mustapha Ssebaggala Kigozi. During their first year in office, they organised and supervised by-elections. The first nationwide election that they are expected to organise is the election of the Local Council leaders. As of April 2018, those were being delayed by lack of sufficient funds.

== Commissioners ==
The following are the current commissioners (2016–2022) The new team was sworn in on 17 January 2017.

1. Simon Mugenyi Byabakama: Chairperson
2. Hajjat Aisha Lubega: Deputy Chairperson
3. Peter Emorut: Commissioner
4. Justine Ahabwe Mugabi: Commissioner
5. Stephen Tashobya: Commissioner
6. Mustapha Ssebagala Kigozi: Commissioner
7. Nathaline Etomaru: Commissioner

== Controversy ==
The Electoral Commission has repeatedly been accused of not being impartial. In the Presidential Elections of 2021 there were 409 polling stations with a 100% turnout, all of which were won by President Museveni. Election forms (so-called Declaration of Results) have been altered at the advantage of president Museveni in a way that the Electoral Commission has not been able to explain.
