= Aisha Lubega =

Ugandan teacher

- Other name: Basajjanaku
- Citizenship: Uganda
- Education: Master in Education (Makerere University), Post Graduate Diploma in Public Administration(Uganda Management Institute now) and a Bachelors of Arts and Diploma in Education( Makerere University)
- Alma mater: Makerere University, Uganda Management Institute
- Employer: Uganda
- Organization: Electoral Commission
- Title: Hajjat.
- Spouse: Badru Wagwa Lubega

Aisha Lubega is a Ugandan teacher, administrator and the deputy Chairperson of the Electoral commission.

== Early life and education ==
Aisha holds a Master in Education (Administration and Planning) from Makerere University, a Post Graduate Diploma in Public Administration from the Institute of Public Administration (renamed Uganda Management Institute now) and a Bachelors of Arts (B.A) degree and a Diploma in Education from Makerere University.

== Career ==
Aisha is the re-appointed Deputy Chairperson of the Electoral Commission which she joined in 2017 and is a teacher by profession. She is an administrator known for her commitment to Gender Equality and Empowerment of Women. She was a teacher at Masaka Secondary School, Nabisunsa girls School where she was the Deputy headteacher and later became its Headteacher(1992–2017).

In 2001, she was rejected by the parliamentary appointment committee which said it was improper to have two people from the same family on statutory commissions because her husband was the Chairman of the Education Service Commission.

== See also ==
- Grace Ndeezi
- Stella Nyanzi
