= Namugongo =

Township in Central Region, Uganda

Namugongo Namugongo
- Uganda Martyrs Shrine, Namugongo
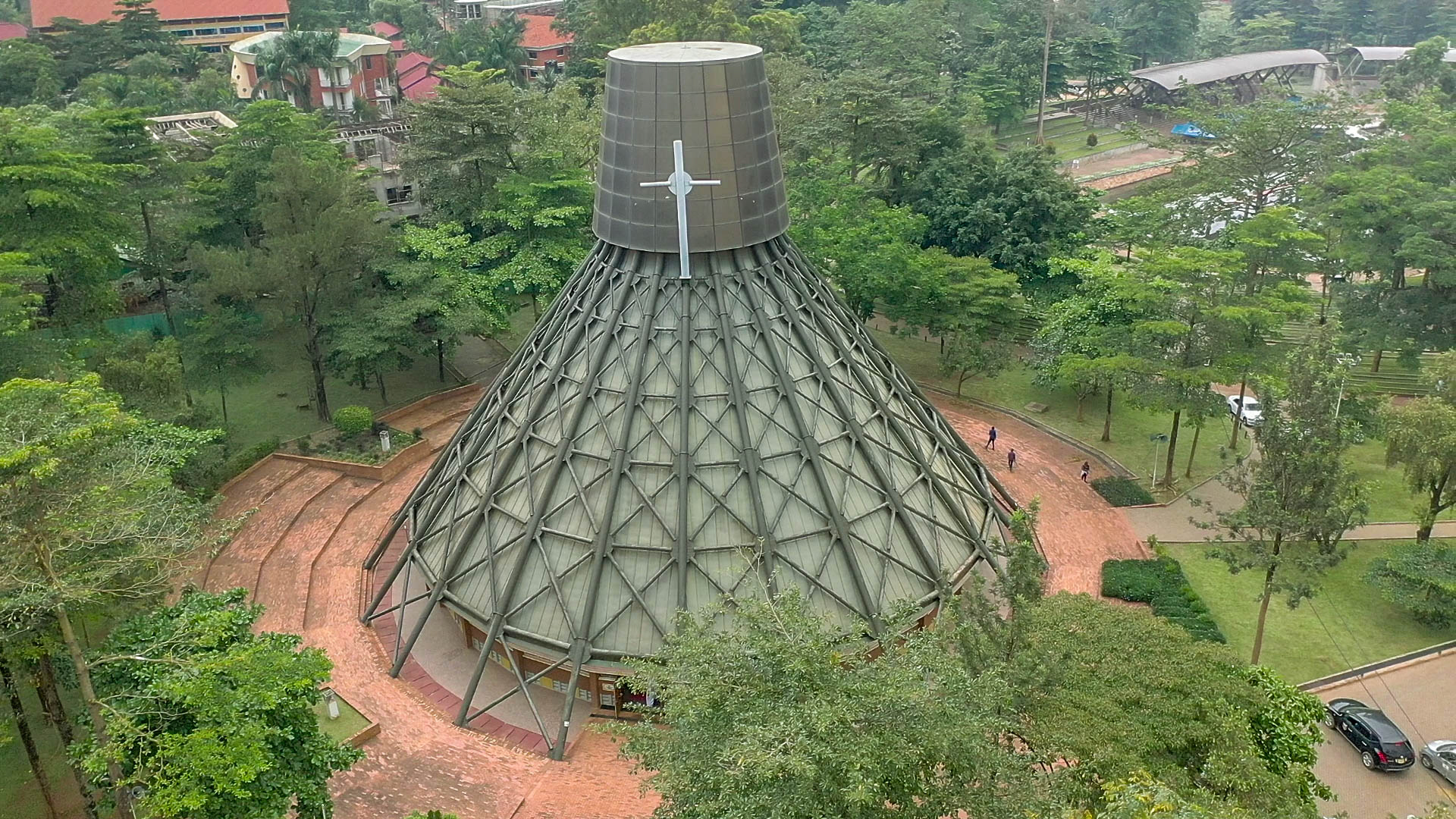
- Namugongo Martyrs Shrine (Catholic Basilica) by Tusk media (2023)
- Nickname: Namugongo
- Location in Uganda
- Coordinates: 00°23′43″N 32°39′57″E
- Country: Uganda
- Region: Central Region
- District: Wakiso District
- County: Kyaddondo
- Constituency: Kira Town Council
- Municipality: Kira, Uganda
- Elevation: 3,870 ft (1,180 m)

Namugongo is a township in the Central Region of Uganda.

== Location ==
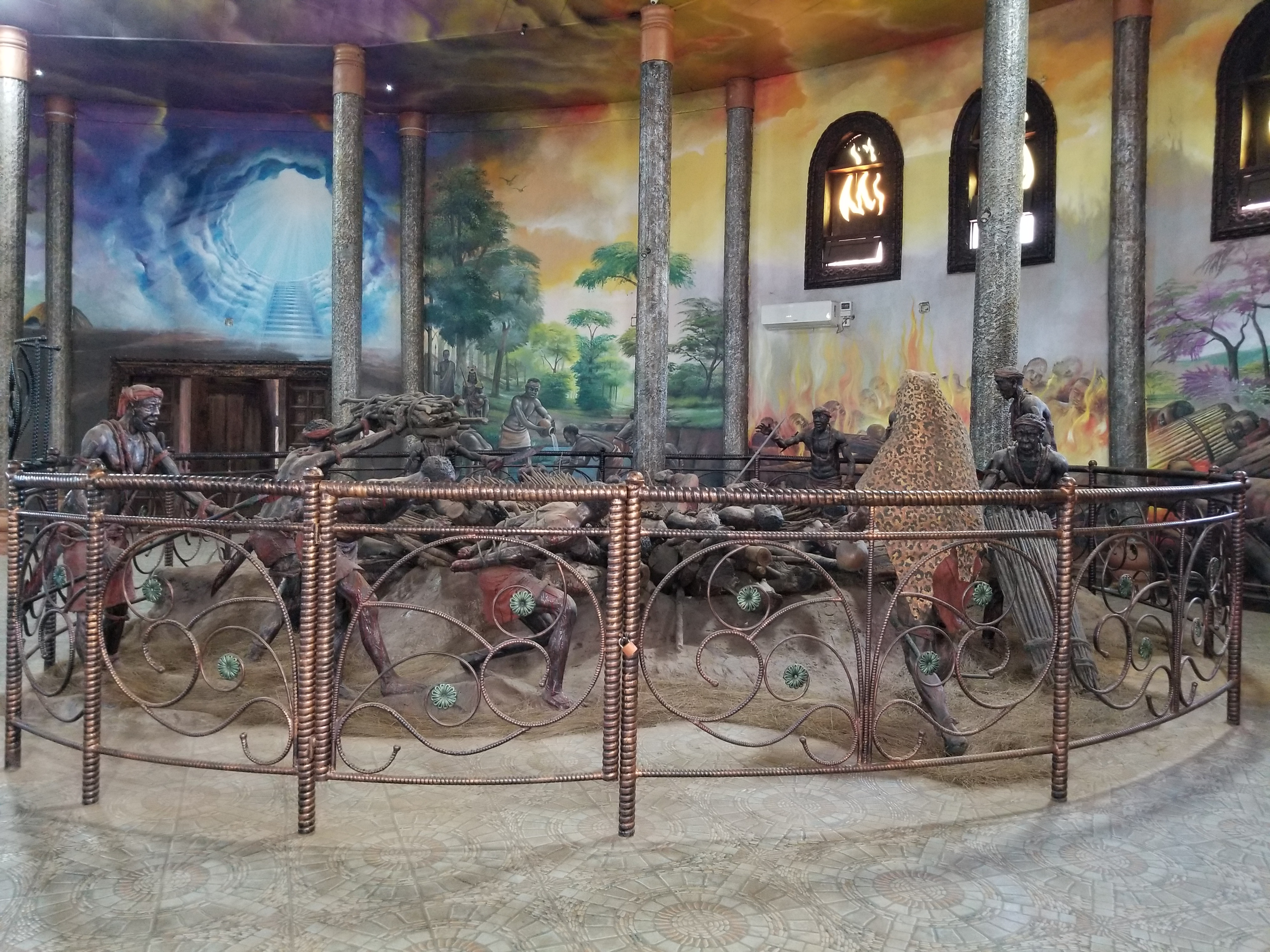
Uganda Martyrs Museum Namugongo.

Namugongo is in Kyaliwajjala Ward, in Kira Municipality, Wakiso District, approximately 12 kilometres (7 mi) north-east of Uganda's capital Kampala. The township is bordered by Nsasa to the north, Sonde and Bukeerere to the east, Bweyogerere to the south-east, Naalya and Kireka directly to the south, Kyaliwajjala to the south-west, and central Kira to the west and north-west. The coordinates of Namugongo are 0°23'43.0"N, 32°39'57.0"E (Latitude:0.395289; Longitude: 32.665835).

== Uganda Martyrs ==
On 3 June 1886, 32 young men, pages of the court of King Mwanga II of Buganda, were burned to death at Namugongo for their refusal to renounce Christianity. They were Anglican and Catholic. Annually on 3 June, Christians from Uganda and other parts of the world congregate at Namugongo to commemorate the lives and religious beliefs of the Uganda Martyrs. Crowds have been estimated in hundreds of thousands in some years. In June 2015, an estimated 2 million people attended the event.

The Uganda Martyrs Shrine Namugongo were first recognised by Joshua Serufusa-Zake (1884–25 June 1985) when he was the Sabaddu of Kira Sub-County. He constructed a structure at the Namugongo site, where it appears shrines were built later for prayer.

His interest in Christianity was enhanced by his father's participation in the wars that brought Christianity to Uganda. His father, Semei Musoke Seruma Katiginya, had earned a name for brevity, "Ngubu" from the wars.

Churches stand in locations where martyrs met their fate, their memory enshrined in the murals and stained glass adorning these sacred spaces. The most prominent shrine is Namugongo, which is located where St. Charles Lwanga and his companions were burned. The Ugandan Christian tradition of honoring martyrs is important because, in doing so, Ugandan Christians honor their pre-Christian heritage of spirituality and ancestry. The martyr's feast happens on June 3, and there are about half a million people who participate in the feast annually, and the day of the feast is a national holiday. Many pilgrims come from Kenya, Rwanda, Tanzania, and all over Uganda to take part in the Ugandan Martyr's Feast Day at Namugongo, and many others follow the celebration on national television.

=== Canonization ===
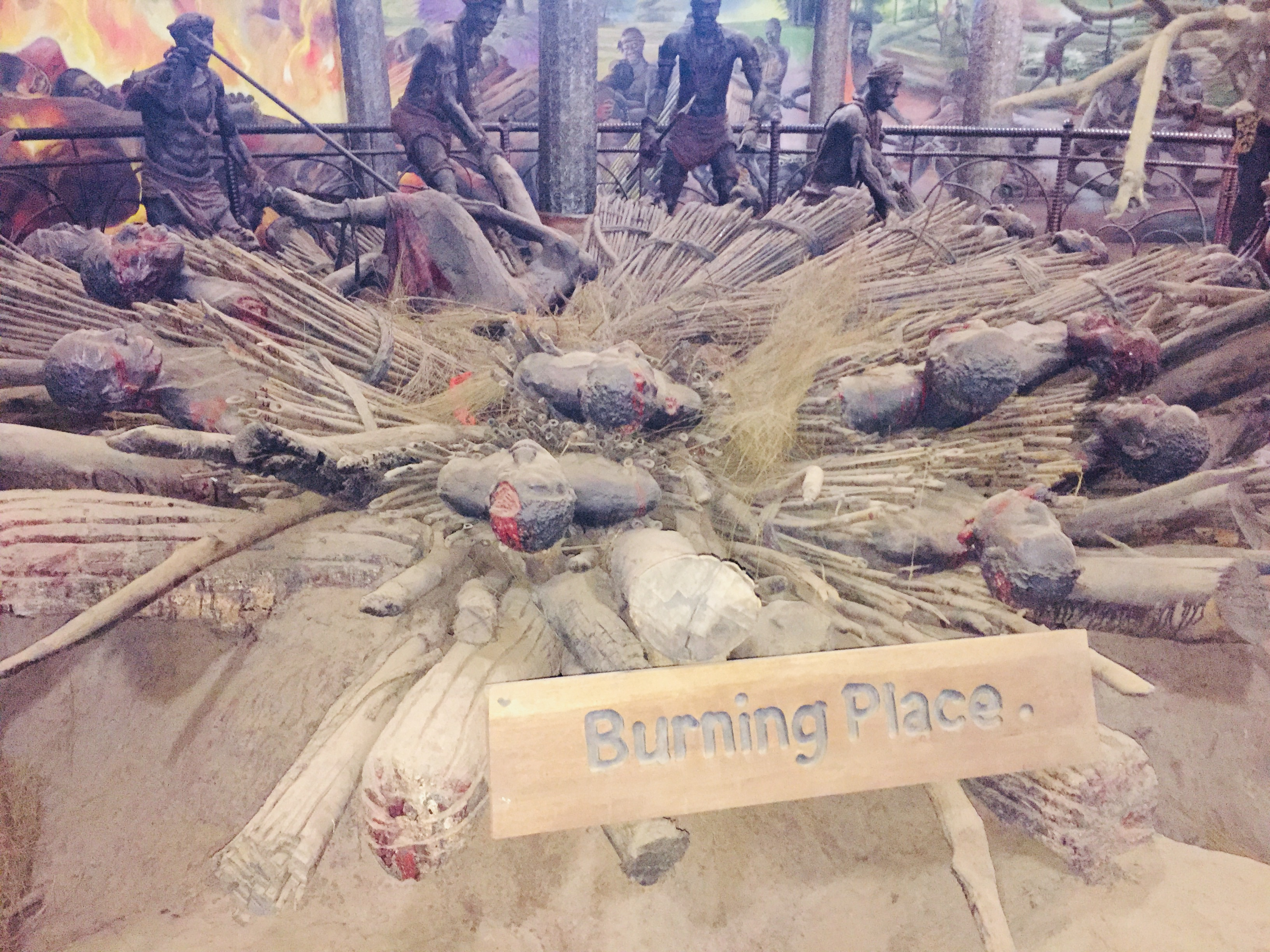
Torturing Chambers of Uganda Martyrs in Namugongo

Twenty-two of the Catholic martyrs were canonized by Pope Paul VI on 18 October 1964 and are regarded as saints in the Catholic Church. A basilica has been built at the spot where the majority of them were burned to death. A church stands at the place where the Anglican martyrs met their death, about 2 miles (3.2 km) further east from the Basilica of the Uganda Martyrs. Documentation is available on 45 martyrs but it is believed that many more believers met their death at the command of Kabaka Mwanga II between 1885 and 1887.

=== Uganda Martyrs' Secondary School ===
Namugongo is the location of the Uganda Martyrs' Secondary School, one of Uganda's leading high schools. The mixed boarding school is a partner with the Stephen Shames Foundation, based in Brooklyn, New York, in the instruction of information technology methods and applications to high-school students in Uganda.

== Points of interest ==
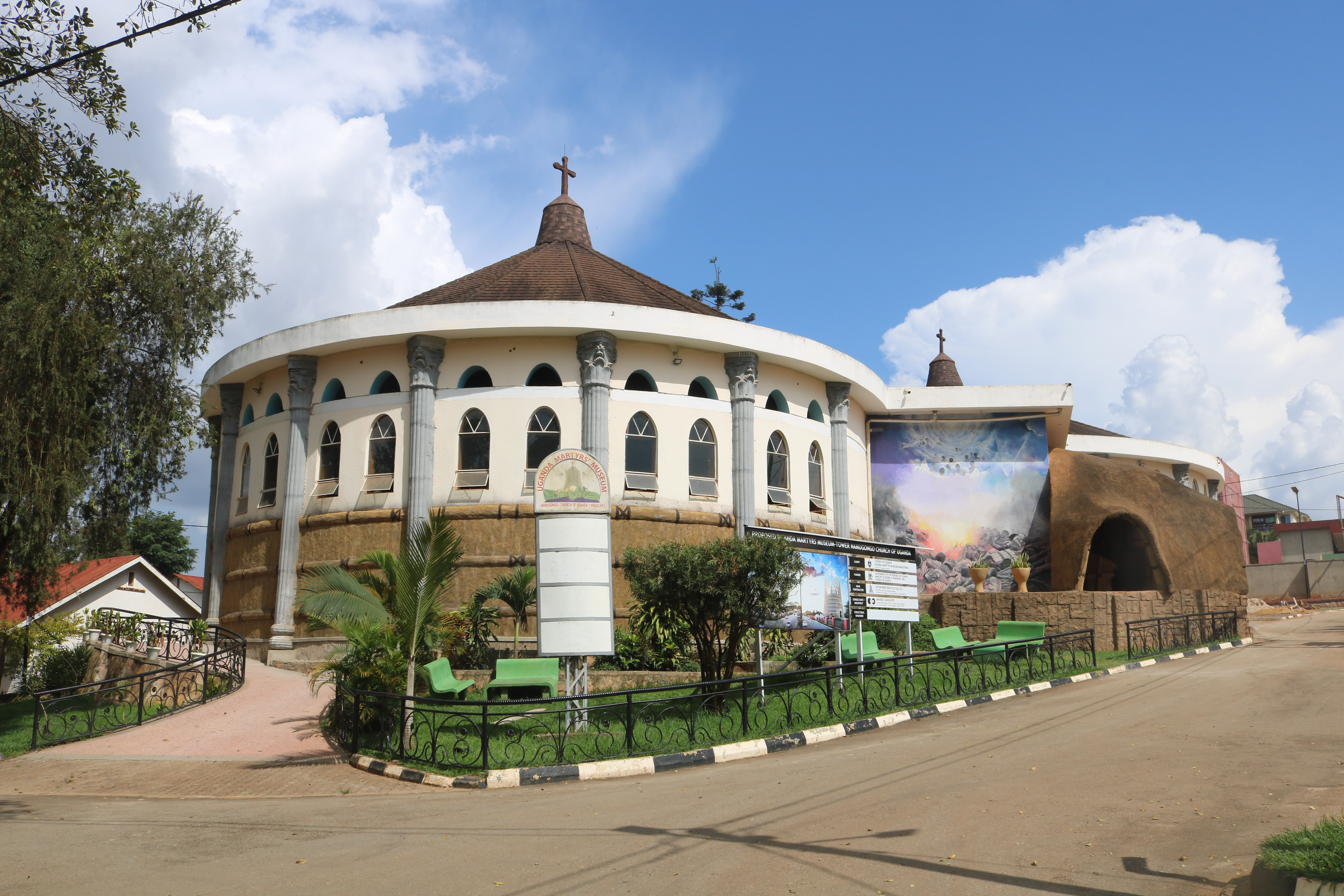
Located at the place where 22 Catholic and 23 Protestant Uganda martyrs were killed by Mukajanga in 1806. The same location has a museum, church, and a seminary and Mukajanga's well.

The following points of interest are found at Namugongo or near its boundaries:

- Basilica of the Uganda Martyrs: a place of worship affiliated with the Roman Catholic Church
- Anglican Uganda Martyrs Shrine: a place of worship affiliated with the Church of Uganda
- Uganda Martyrs Primary School: a public, mixed, elementary school (grades 1–7)
- Uganda Martyrs Senior Secondary School: a public, mixed, boarding high school (grades 8–13)
- Uganda Martyrs Nursery & Daycare Centre: an early education institution erected to commemorate 75 years since Namugongo's Roman Catholic Parish was established in 1935.

== See also ==
- Roman Catholicism in Uganda
- The white fathers mission in Uganda
- The Uganda Martyrs
