= Kampala Kingdom Hotel =

Mall in Uganda

Kingdom Kampala
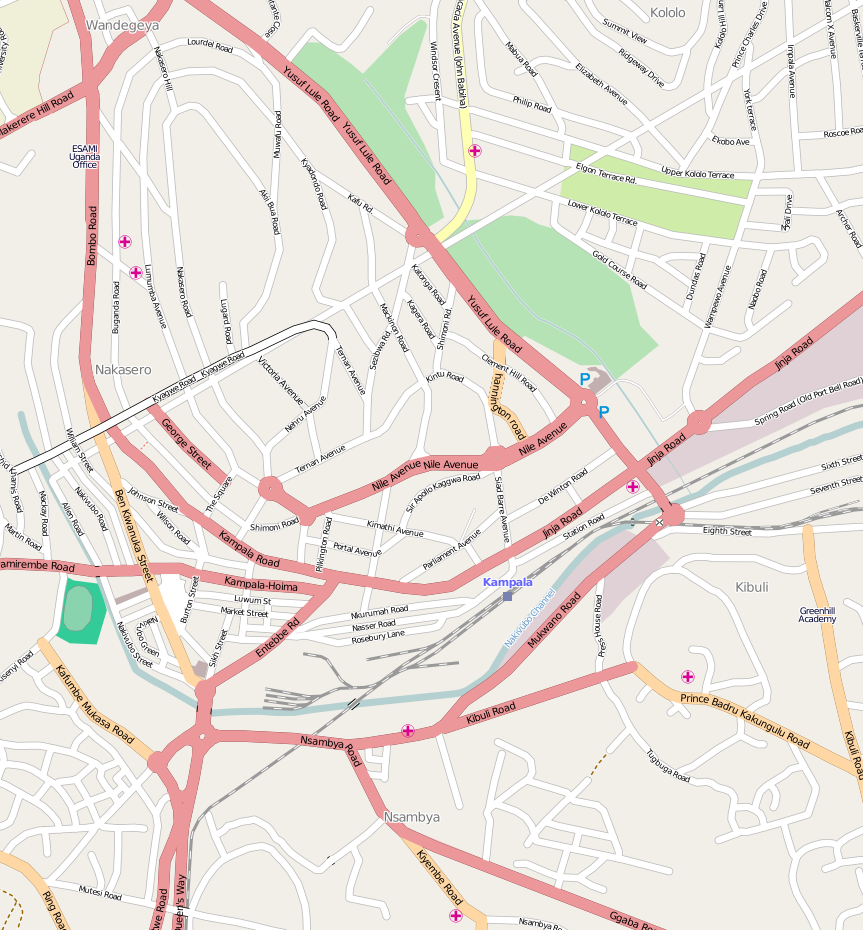
- Location within Kampala

General information
- Location: Kampala, Uganda
- Coordinates: 00°19′02″N 32°35′28″E
- Opening: 2019 (Expected)
- Owner: Ruparelia Group
- Management: Ruparelia Group

Technical details
- Floor count: 12

Other information
- Number of rooms: 200

Kampala Kingdom is a mall and shopping complex in Kampala, Uganda's capital city.

== Location ==
The Mall is located on Nakasero Hill, an upscale neighborhood in Kampala, the capital and largest city of Uganda. The piece of property where the mall is located is bordered by Nile Avenue to the north, Yusuf Lule Road to the east, and De Winton Road to the south. The National Theater and Uganda Broadcasting Corporation border the location to the west. The mall complex is being erected on a 15 acres (6.1 ha) site that was previously occupied by Shimoni Teacher Training College, which was relocated to Kitikifumba in Kira Municipality. The elevation of the construction site is 1,160 metres (3,810 ft) above sea level, facing southeast, adjacent to Oasis Mall in Kampala's central business district. The coordinates of the mall are 0°19'02.0"N, 32°35'28.0"E (Latitude:0.317223; Longitude:32.591112).

== Overview ==
Kampala Kingdom is part of a business/residential real estate development that includes:

1. A 200-room four-star mall tower - The Kampala Kingdom mall.
2. Rentable retail and office space, measuring in excess of 22,000 square metres (240,000 ft^{2})
3. Parking space for over 450 vehicles.

== History ==
In 2006, Kingdom mall Investments (KHI), a real estate investment and development company, headquartered in Dubai, United Arab Emirates, leased 15 acres (6.1 ha) in the center of Kampala from the government of Uganda for 99 years. KHI planned to construct a luxury mall complex on the property, with the opening date planned for 2009. KHI is chaired by Alwaleed Bin Talal, a prince of Saudi Arabia.

Following the Global Recession of 2008 and 2009, KHI became unable to fund the project on its own. They sold majority shareholding in the development to Azure Holdings Limited, a subsidiary of the Mara Group, also headquartered in Dubai. Mara Group is also the parent company of Kensington Uganda Limited, a real estate investment and development company. Construction of the mall, technically known as Kingdom Kampala mall, began in July 2010. InterContinental mall has signed an agreement with the mall developers to manage the mall when completed.

In January 2016, Crane Management Services, a subsidiary of the Ruparelia Group and South African developer Abland Africa, entered into a joint venture with Kingdom mall Limited to complete the construction of the mall complex. The new development entails a 200 bedroom 4 star mall, 40,000 square metres (430,000 ft^{2}) office space and 16,000 square metres (170,000 ft^{2}) rentable space. Completion is planned for 2018 at an estimated cost of US$300 million.

== Construction ==
The mall, office tower and conference complex are estimated to cost US$300 million in construction. Commissioning is expected during the 2nd quarter of calendar year 2019.

== See also ==
- Kampala Capital City Authority
- List of hotels in Uganda
- Kampala Central Division
- InterContinental Hotels
- List of tallest buildings in Kampala
