= Bukasa Inland Port =

- Click on the map for a fullscreen view

Location
- Country: Uganda
- Location: Bukasa, Kira Town, Wakiso District
- Coordinates: 00°17′23″N 32°40′14″E

Details
- Owned by: Government of Uganda
- Type of harbour: Natural/Artificial

The map showing Wakiso District were Bukasa Inland port is being constructed

Bukasa Inland Port is an under construction inland port in Uganda. Construction of the first phase began on 2 May 2024 with completion expected in 2025.

== Location ==
The port is located along the northern shores of Lake Victoria, on approximately 400 hectares (1.5 sq mi) in the neighborhood of Bukasa in Wakiso District, about 16 kilometres (10 mi), by road, south-east of the central business district of Kampala, the capital and largest city of Uganda. When fully functional, the port is expected to occupy a bigger land area. Efforts to secure more land are underway.

In February 2019, the Daily Monitor reported that the project area had been increased to 465 hectares (1,149 acres).

== Overview ==
When completed the inland port is designed to handle up to 5.2 million tonnes of freight annually. The port will facilitate movement of goods from the Tanzanian ports of Dar es Salaam and Tanga, via rail to the port of Mwanza on Lake Victoria. Barges would then bring the cargo over the lake to Bukasa. This would reduce Uganda's near-total dependence on the port of Mombasa, Kenya.

== Funding ==
Two German financial institutions agreed to lend US$48 million towards the construction of this port. The Uganda government will contribute US$8.5 million to this project. The funding for the construction of the port is as depicted in the table below:

Bukasa Inland Port Funding
| Rank | Name of Funder | Dollars Funded (Millions) | Percentage Funding |
|---|---|---|---|
| 1 | European Export and Trade Bank | 24.0 | 42.48 |
| 2 | Commerzbank | 24.0 | 42.48 |
| 3 | Government of Uganda | 8.5 | 15.04 |
| | Total | 56.5 | 100.00 |

Totals may be off slightly, due to rounding.

== Construction ==
As of February 2018, GAUFF Gmbh & Co. Engineering KG, a German firm that is performing the consultancy work for the construction of the port, is finalizing the master design of the development. In July 2018, dredging of the swamps is expected to commence. Physical construction of the administration unit and the shipping facilities called Roll-on/Roll-off (RoRo) is expected to commence in June 2019, and last until April 2022. More development and expansion will continue until 2030. Construction of the initial phase is expected to last three years.

In February 2019, the National Environment Management Authority of Uganda (NEMA), approved the construction of this inland port. Construction will be phased.

Phase I

The first phase will involve construction of the port, administration jetty, free trade zone, shunting yard, a two-berth multipurpose terminal and a two berth Roro terminal.

Phase II

The second phase, expected to be complete by 2030, will extend the multipurpose terminal by additional two berths to a total quay length of 540 metres (1,772 ft).

Phase III

The third phase, to be completed by 2040, will extend the quay length of the multipurpose terminal to 960 metres (3,150 ft). All three phases will require the dredging Lake Victoria.

== Developments ==
The engineering, procurement and construction (EPC) contract for the first phase was awarded to "Coppieters JV", at a contract price of €14.9 million. Gauff Consulting Engineers from Germany are the supervising consultants.

== See also ==
- Ministry of Works and Transport (Uganda)
