= Nsasa =

- Location in Uganda; Placement on map is approximate
- Coordinates: 00°25′05″N 32°39′20″E
- Country: Uganda
- Region: Central Region
- District: Wakiso District
- Municipality: Kira, Uganda
- County: Kyaddondo
- Constituency: Kira Municipality

Government
  - Local Council 1 (LC1) Chairman: Derrick Lukwago
  - MP: Ibrahim Ssemujju Nganda
- Elevation: 3,870 ft (1,180 m)

Nsasa is a neighborhood in Kira Municipality, Kyaddondo County, Wakiso District, in the Central Region of Uganda.

== Location ==
Nsasa is bordered by Kigulu to the north, Misindye in Mukono District to the east, Namugongo to the southeast, downtown Kira to the southwest, and Mulawa to the west. This location is approximately 18.5 kilometres (11 mi), by road, northeast of Kampala, the capital and largest city of Uganda. The coordinates of Nsasa are 0°25'05.0"N, 32°39'20.0"E (Latitude:0.418056; Longitude:32.655556).

== Overview ==
Before 2001, Nsasa was a residential and farming village. In 2001, a law was passed incorporating the village into the newly created Kira Municipality, the second largest urban center in Uganda, with an estimated population of over 300,000 according to the 2014 national population census.

During the 21st Century, the neighborhood has grown into a highly-sought-after upscale residential area, with land values in the neighborhood of USh600 million (US$160,000) per acre, as of June 2019.

== See also ==
- Bulindo
