= Drake Lubega =

Ugandan businessman

- Born: Francis Drake Lubega c. 1959 (age 66–67); Uganda
- Citizenship: Ugandan
- Occupation: Businessman
- Organization: Jesco Industries Limited
- Known for: One of the wealthiest people in Uganda
- Criminal charges: 1. Counterfeiting a government quality mark (UNBS Logo) - which constitutes fraudulent misrepresentation.; 2. Producing substandard goods - that do not meet Uganda National Bureau of Standards (UNBS) regulations.
- Criminal penalty: Fine of Ush 60 million
- Children: 11

Francis Drake Lubega, better known as Drake Lubega, is a Ugandan businessman. According to a 2012 report, Lubega was listed among Uganda’s wealthiest people.

== Businesses and investments ==
His investment company is called Jesco Industries Limited (JIL). Drake is the majority shareholder. The company was incorporated on 7 October 2005. JIL owns and controls buildings and parcels of land in Uganda's capital city of Kampala and in areas outside that city.

== Personal life ==
Drake's first wife by traditional marriage is Nalongo Grace Nakitto; together they are the parents of seven children. Since separating from Nakitto, Drake dated Benita from 1997 and married her on 23 December 2000 at Namirembe Cathedral. The couple divorced in 2013 and Drake married a new wife in a Kiganda traditional ceremony. Together, they are the parents of four children.

== Criminal conviction ==
On 25 September 2019 Lubega was convicted on two counts of fabricating substandard goods that do not conform to the Uganda National Bureau of Standards (UNBS) standards and for making a false representation on a commodity by forging the UNBS logo following his confession after he had spent a night at Luzira maximum prison.
