= Uganda National Bureau of Standards =

Coordinates: 00°22′06″N 32°39′43″E

- UNBS

Agency overview
- Formed: 1 July 1989 (age 37)
- Jurisdiction: Government of Uganda
- Headquarters: Bweyogerere, Industrial Park, Uganda
- Employees: 500+ (2021)
- Agency executive: Eng. James Kasigwa, Executive Director
- Parent agency: Uganda Ministry of Trade, Industry and Cooperatives
- Website: www.unbs.go.ug

The Uganda National Bureau of Standards (UNBS) is a government agency, established by an Act of Parliament of Uganda,

UNBS is under the Ministry of Trade, Industry and Co-operatives established by the UNBS Act Cap 327 and became operational in 1989. It is governed by the National Standards Council and headed by the Executive Director who is responsible for the day-to-day operation of UNBS.

The UNBS is responsible for the formulation, promotion of the use of, and the enforcement of standards in protection of the environment, public health and safety.

The Mandate of UNBS is :

- Formulation and promotion of the use of standards;
- Enforcing standards in protection of public health and safety and the environment against dangerous and sub-standard products;
- Ensuring fairness in trade and precision in industry through reliable measurement systems; and
- Strengthening the economy of Uganda by assuring the quality of locally manufactured products to enhance the competitiveness of exports in regional and international markets.

== Location ==
The headquarters of UNBS are located in Standards House, in "Bweyogerere Industrial Park", at Plot 2–12 Kyaliwajala Road, in Kira Town, Wakiso District, approximately 13 kilometres (8 mi), by road, northeast of the central business district of Kampala, the capital city and largest metropolitan area in Uganda. The geographical coordinates of the UNBS headquarters are: 0°22'06.0"N, 32°39'43.0"E (Latitude:0.368333; Longitude:32.661944).

== Overview ==
The main functions of the Uganda National Bureau of Standards are (a) to formulate and promote the use of national standards and (b) to develop quality control and quality assurance systems. The objective is to provide consumer protection, safeguard public safety and health, enhance commercial and industrial development and promote international trade. UNBS is under mandate to develop and promote standardisation, quality assurance, laboratory testing and metrology.

UNBS, in collaboration with other government agencies have launched a campaign to attempt to eliminate sub-standard products from the Ugandan market. In July 2017, the agency destroyed goods valued at USh900 million (approximately US$253,000), that were deemed to be sub-standard. In February 2016, UNBS banned the sale of cosmetic products containing mercury and hydroquinone.

== Administration ==
The agency is governed by a nine-person National Standards Council. The day-to-day activities of the bureau are supervised by an 18-person management team, headed by Ben Manyindo.

== See also ==
- Economy of Uganda
- Ministry of Trade, Industry and Cooperatives (Uganda)
