= Simon Mugenyi Byabakama =

Ugandan lawyer and judge

Honorable Simon Mugenyi Byabakama
- Born: January 31, 1957 (age 69); Hoima, Uganda
- Citizenship: Uganda
- Education: Makerere University (Bachelor of Laws); Law Development Centre (Diploma in Legal Practice)
- Occupations: Lawyer, judge
- Years active: 1981 — present
- Known for: Law
- Title: Justice of the Court of Appeal of Uganda and Chairman of the Electoral Commission of Uganda
- Spouse: Dorothy Kasaija Mugenyi

Simon Mugenyi Byabakama is a Ugandan lawyer and judge, on the Court of Appeal of Uganda, which doubles as the country's Constitutional Court. He was appointed to the court of appeal on 11 October 2015.

On 18 November 2016, Justice Simon Byabakama was named as the Chairman of the Electoral Commission of Uganda, replacing Engineer Badru Kiggundu, whose 14-year, two-term reign had ended.

== Background and education ==
He was born in Hoima District, on 31 January 1957. He attended local schools for his elementary education. He studied at Kabalega Secondary School, in Masindi for his Ordinary Level studies, graduating in 1974. He continued with his Advanced Level education at Kabalega, graduating in 1976.

He studied law at Makerere University, Uganda's largest and oldest public university, graduating in 1980 with a Bachelor of Laws (LLB) degree. Later the same year, he received a Diploma in Legal Practice, from the Law Development Centre, in Kampala, the national capital. He was then admitted to the Uganda Bar.

== Work experience ==
His first job was as a Resident State Attorney in Masindi District, working there until 1987. He then was elevated to senior state attorney in the Directorate of Public Prosecution, in the Uganda Ministry of Justice and Constitutional Affairs. In 1992, he became Principal State Attorney. In 1996, he was promoted to Senior Principal State Attorney and was appointed deputy director of Public Prosecution, his rank at the time he joined the bench in May 2008.

== Judicial career ==
He was appointed as a judge of the High Court of Uganda in May 2008, serving as the Resident High Court Judge in Lira (2008–2010), in Soroti (2010–2013), and in Masindi (2013–2015). In October 2015, Judge Byabakama was one of the six High Court Judges appointed to the Court of Appeal.

== At Uganda Electoral Commission ==
In November 2016, Justice Byabakama was appointed to the Chairmanship of the Electoral Commission of Uganda (EC) by President Yoweri Museveni. In his capacity as the chairman of the EC, he was sworn in as a member of the board of directors of the National Identification and Registration Authority, on 9 August 2017.

== Family ==
Byabakama is married to Dorothy Kasaija Mugenyi and has six children.

== See also ==
- Supreme Court of Uganda
- Constitutional Court of Uganda
