= Masaka Secondary School =

Location
- Masaka, Masaka District; Uganda
- Coordinates: 00°21′04″S 31°44′15″E

Information
- Type: Public Middle School and High School (8–13)
- Motto: Knowledge is Treasure
- Established: 1954
- Principal: Hajji Musa Musokee Mpungu
- Enrollment: 3,700+ (2023)
- Athletics: Rugby, soccer, track, tennis, volleyball, basketball
- Website: www.masakasec.ac.ug

Masaka Secondary School is a mixed, day and boarding middle and high school, located in Masaka District, in Central Uganda.And also its a Muslim school which teaches Arabic though it also welcomes non Muslims

== Location ==
The school campus is situated in the city of Masaka in Kimaanya-Kyabakuza Division , Masaka District, approximately 138 kilometres (86 mi) west of Kampala, the capital of Uganda, and the largest city in that country. The campus is located to the immediate southwest of the central business district of Masaka. It is bordered by Nakongolero Road to the west, by Yellow Knife Street to the north, by Bwala Hill Road to the east. Hill Road Primary School is to the south of Masaka Secondary School. The coordinates of the school campus are:0°21'04.0"S, 31°44'15.0"E(Latitude:-0.351111; Longitude:31.737500).

== Overview ==
Masaka Secondary School is a public middle and high school, administered by the Uganda Ministry of Education & Sports. With a student population in excess of 4000 in 2016, the school is one of the largest secondary schools in the country and east Africa.

== History ==
The school was founded in 1954. It is a member of the Uganda Muslim Education Association (UMEA) an umbrella body that brings together all Muslim founded schools. The first headteacher of the School was Mr. Stephen Kerr, it has had a number of prominent headteachers in the country including Ali Ssendagire and Lubega Waggwa. In 2012, it received a grant of US$2 million (UGX:5 billion), from the African Development Bank, in collaboration with the Uganda Government, to construct new classrooms, a computer center, a library and new science laboratories.

== Notable alumni ==
Notable alumni of Masaka Secondary School include the following:

- Abed Bwanika - politician, twice former presidential candidate and President of the People's Development Party and Member of Parliament of.
- David Tinyefunza - former Director of National Intelligence in Uganda
- Hussien Kyanjo - Former Member of Parliament for Makindye West
- Mathias Mpuuga - Former Youth Minister in Buganda Government and member of parliament for Nyendo-Mukungwe in Masaka City Leader of Opposition in Parliament
- Ibrahim Ssemujju Nganda - Member of Parliament for Kira Division
- Yusuf Nsubuga, Commissioner for Secondary Education, Uganda Ministry of Education.
- Hussein Kyanjo- former Ugandan legislator
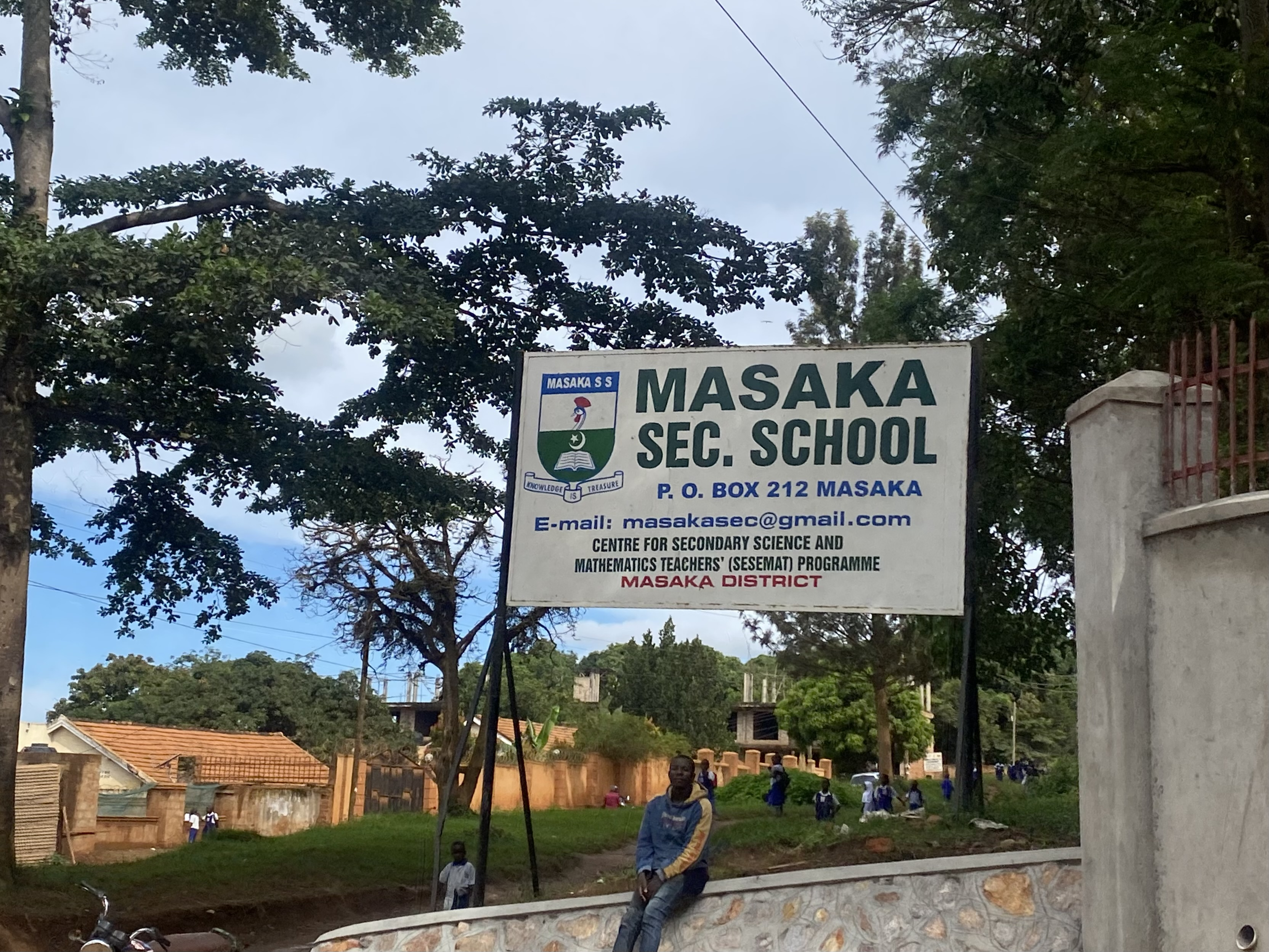
Signpost

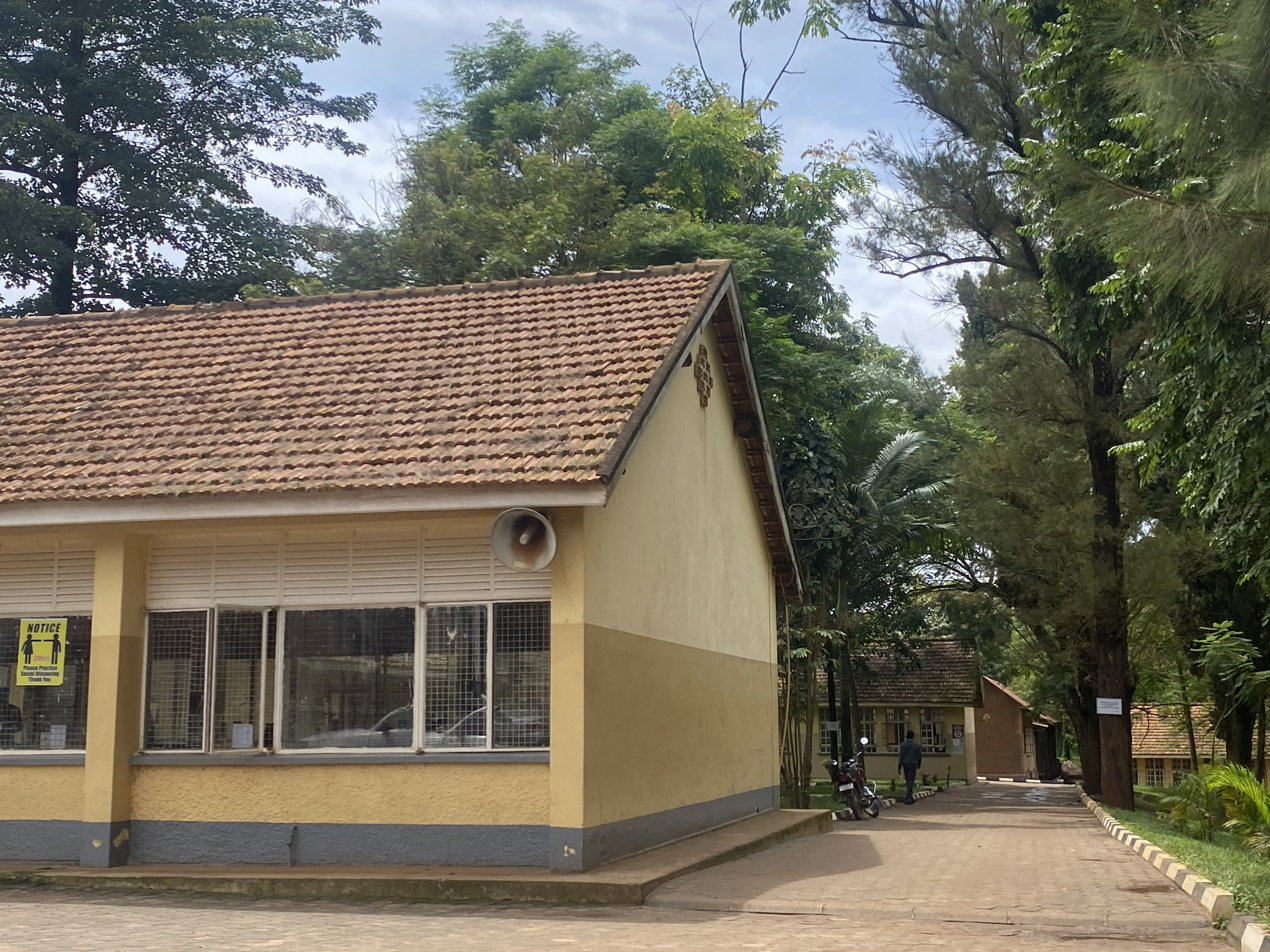
Class Block

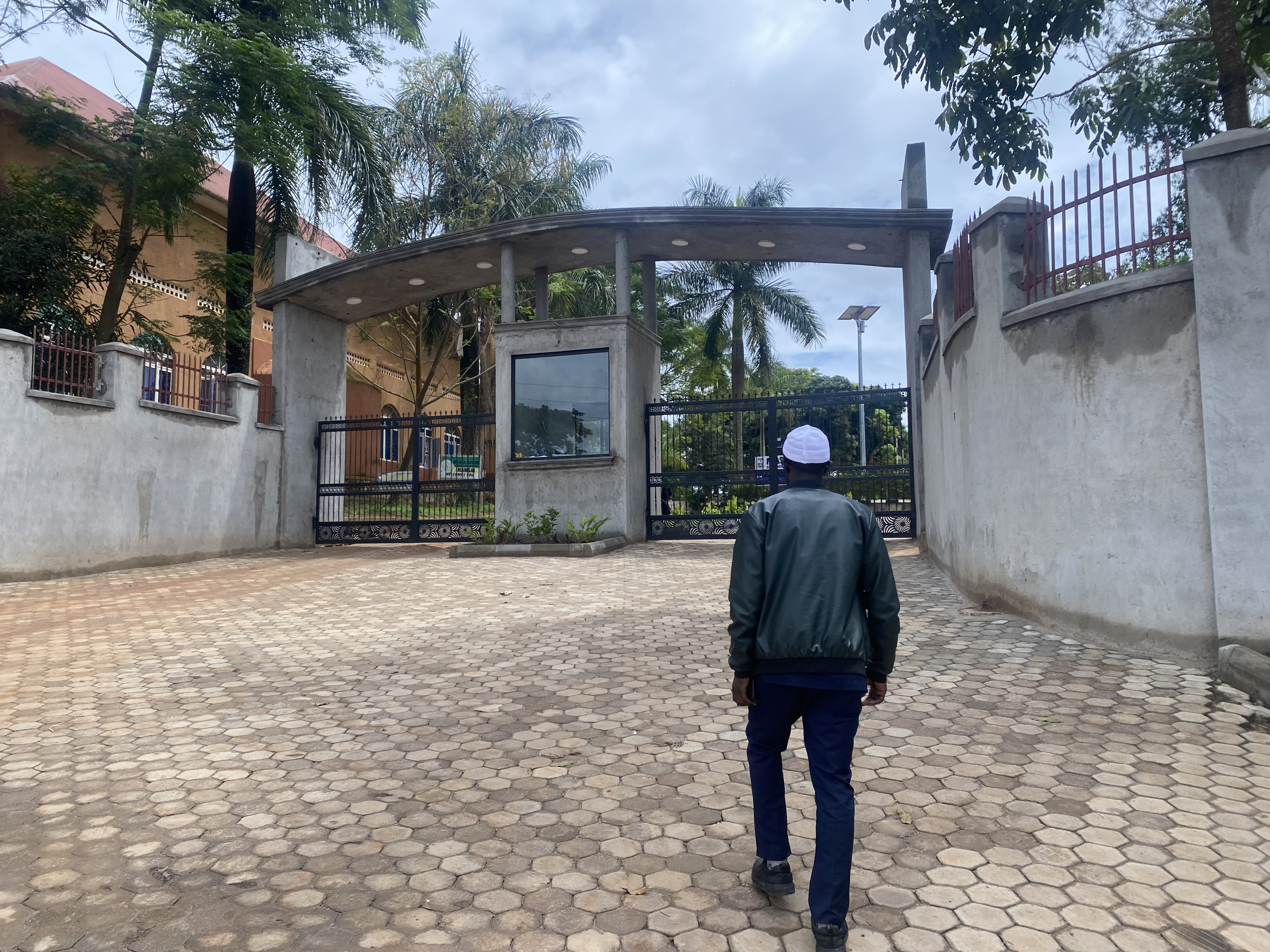
Main entrance to Masaka Secondary School

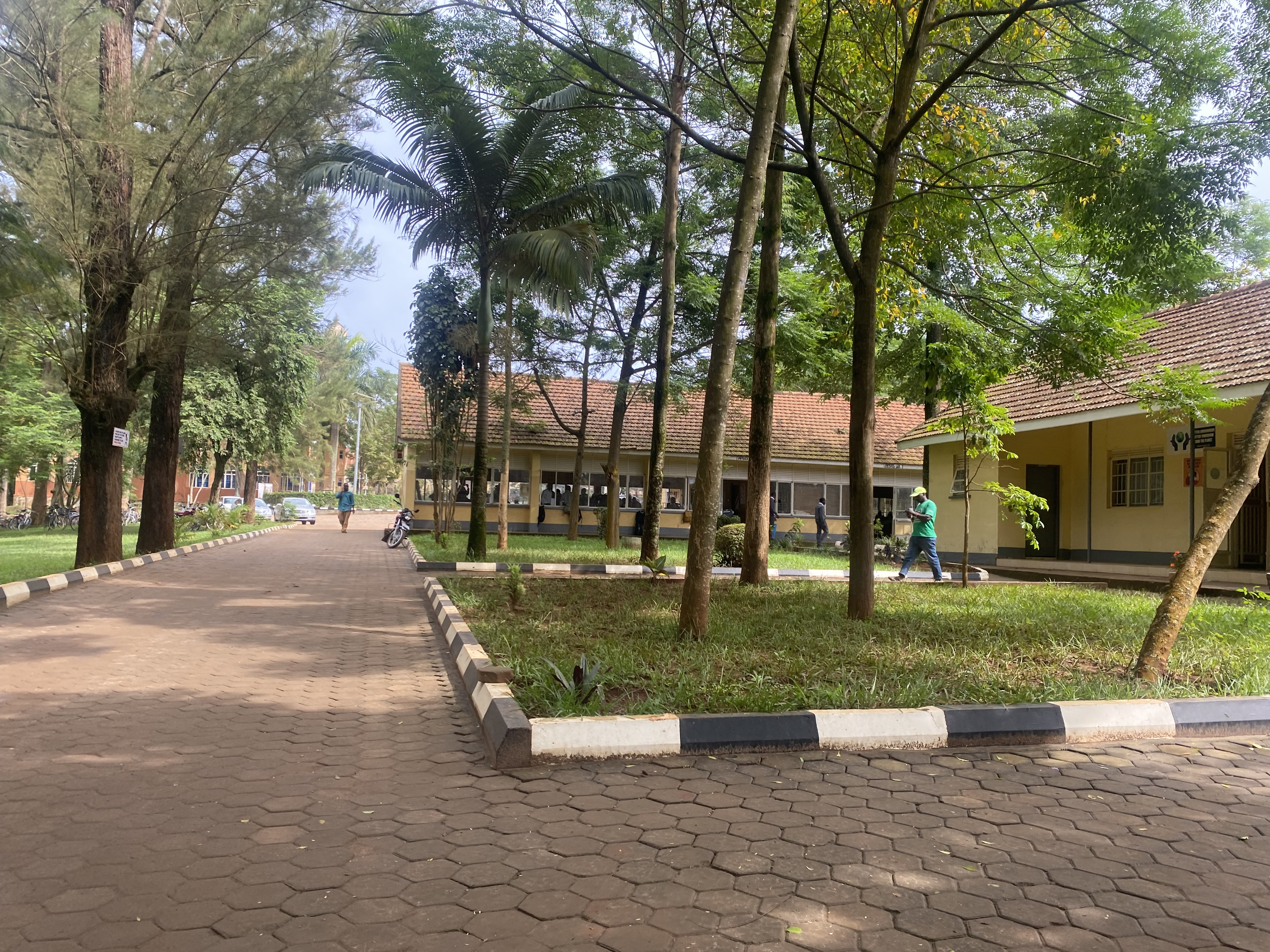
Compound

== See also ==
- Education in Uganda
- List of schools in Uganda
