= Bukeerere =

- Map of Uganda showing the location of Bukeerere.
- Coordinates: 00°24′27″N 32°42′07″E
- Country: Uganda
- District: Mukono District
- Elevation: 1,121 m (3,678 ft)
- Time zone: UTC+3 (EAT)

Bukeerere, sometimes wrongly spelled as Bukerere, is a township in the Central Region of Uganda. The correct phonetic spelling is with two 'e's after the 'k'.

== Location ==
Bukeerere is in Mukono District, 11 kilometres (6.8 mi), by road, northwest of Mukono, the headquarters of the district. This is approximately 19 kilometres (12 mi), by road, northeast of Kampala, Uganda's capital and largest city. The coordinates of Bukeerere are 0°24'27.0"N, 32°42'07.0"E (Latitude:0.407498; Longitude:32.701953). The average elevation of Bukeerere is approximately 1,121 metres (3,678 ft) above sea level.

== Overview ==
The town of Bukeerere is the headquarters of Bukeerere parish, in Goma sub-county, Kyaggwe county. The Bukerere Road leads from Seeta on the Kampala–Jinja Highway through Bukeerere to join the Mukono-Kalagi Road at Kasaayi.

All the land in Bukerere, approximately 1 square mile (640 acres), is mailo land that is owned by the descendants of Stanslaus Mugwanya, one of the three regents during the reign of Daudi Cwa II of Buganda. Settlers on this land are sitting tenants without land titles. They are expected to pay annual lease payments to the respective and owners.
