= Ibrahim Ssemujju Nganda =

Ugandan politician

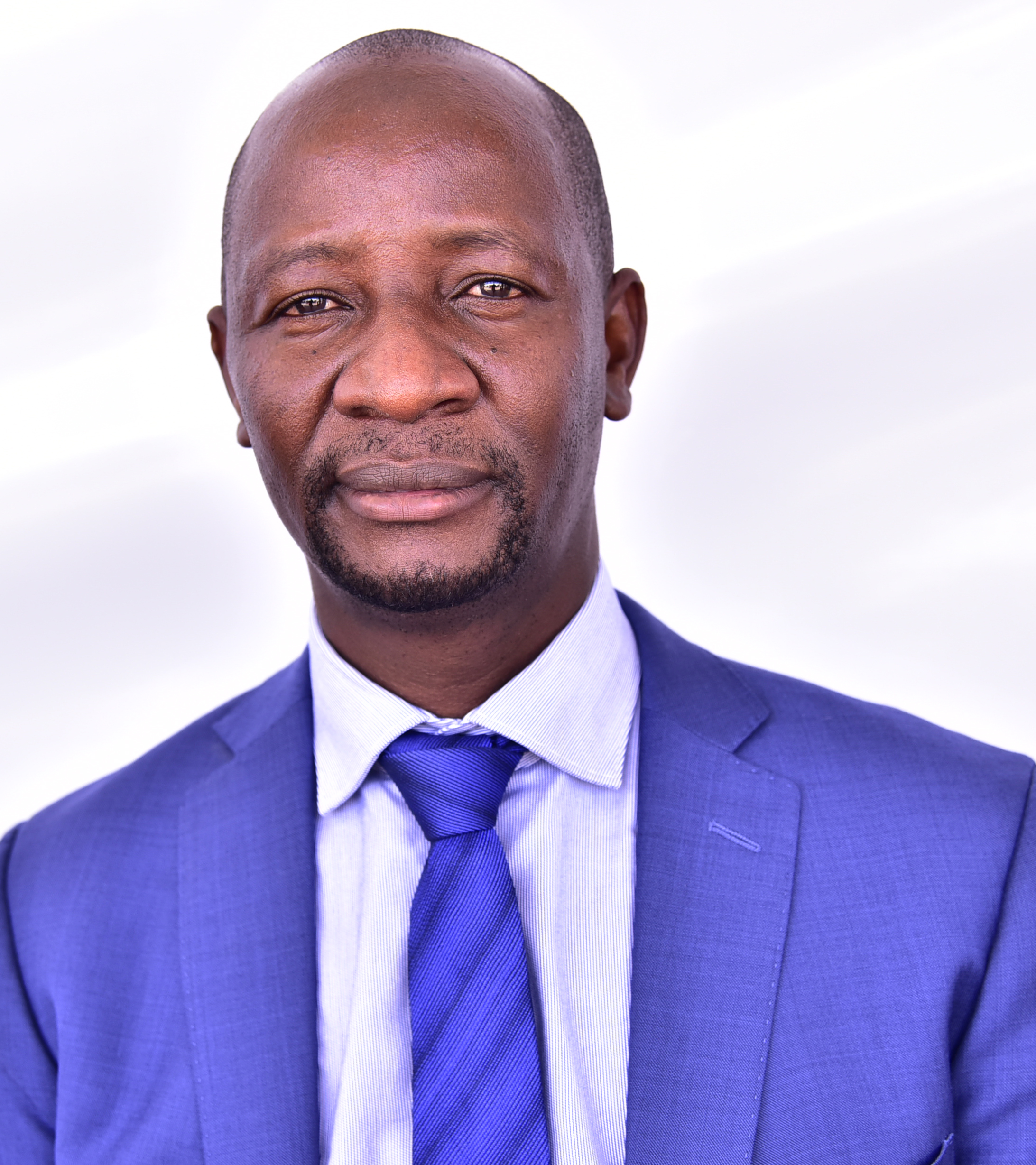
- Born: 23 September 1973 (age 53); Uganda
- Citizenship: Uganda
- Education: Masaka Secondary School (Uganda Certificate of Education, Uganda Advanced Certificate of Education); Makerere University (Bachelor of Mass Communication)
- Occupations: Journalist and politician
- Years active: 1995–present
- Known for: Politics
- Title: Member of Parliament (Kiira Municipality)
- Political party: People's Front for Freedom
- Spouse: Faridah Ssemujju

Ibrahim Ssemujju Nganda (23 September 1973), commonly known as Ibrahim Ssemujju, is a Ugandan journalist and politician. He is the former member of Parliament for Kira Municipality from 2011 to 2026.

== Early life and education ==
Ssemujju was born in Bijaaba Village, Kyazanga Municipality, Lwengo District, on 23 September 1973. At that time, Lwengo District was still part of Masaka District. He is the son of Hajji Ali Nganda Nkwanga and Hajati Sophia Nalwooga, one of his forty-eight children and one of her sixteen offspring.

He attended the Bijaaba Islamic Institute, "a few meters from his birthplace", obtaining the Primary Leaving Certificate while there. After the institute started a secondary school section, Ssemujju joined. However, by Senior 2, most of his female classmates had found husbands and dropped out, while his male cohorts left for odd jobs in nearby Masaka Town. He raised whatever little capital he could and convinced his father to enroll him in Masaka Secondary School for his Senior 3 studies. At that time, he barely spoke any English, but they admitted him anyway.

He progressively did well and passed his O-Level examinations in 1992. He went on to pursue his A-Level education, also at Masaka Secondary School. He graduated at the top of his class in 1995. He was admitted to Makerere University, on a full Ugandan government scholarship to study mass communication. He graduated in 1998 with a Bachelor of Arts mass communication.

== Career ==
Straight out of Makerere, he was hired as a reporter for the Daily Monitor, one of the two leading English language daily newspapers in Uganda, serving in that role until 2004. His beat was coverage of the Ugandan parliament. From 2000 until 2001, he taught journalism at the Islamic University in Uganda. In 2004, he left the Daily Monitor to join The Observer, both as a reporter and as a shareholder. He was assigned the role of political editor at the Weekly Observer, serving in that role until 2011. In 2009, he was assigned additional duties as the editor, educational news. In 2011, he resigned from his journalism assignments to contest the parliamentary seat of Kyaddondo County East. He ran on the Forum for Democratic Change (FDC) political party platform. He won and he was in that seat until 2016 . Prior to the February 2016 presidential, parliamentary, and local elections, Kira Municipality was awarded a parliamentary seat, separate from Kyaddondo East. In the 2021 general elections, Ssemujju contested again for the same seat under the FDC political party banner.

Ssemujju fell out with FDC and together with Erias Lukwago and Kiiza Besigye formed a new polictical party. People's Front for Freedom (PFF) was launched on 8 July 2025. Ssemujju now subscribes to PFF.

Ssemujju recontested for the Kira parliamentary seat in 2026 and lost to NUPs George Musisi in the hotly contested elections.

On 19th July, 2026, He ran out of the country to currently undisclosed country due to fear of being imprisoned.

== Other considerations ==
In parliament, he chaired the Committee on Commissions, Statutory Authorities and State Enterprises. He is also a member of the Committee on Defence and Internal Affairs and of the Business Committee. He is married to Faridah Ssemujju, and together are the parents of two daughters and two sons.
