= Bweyogerere =

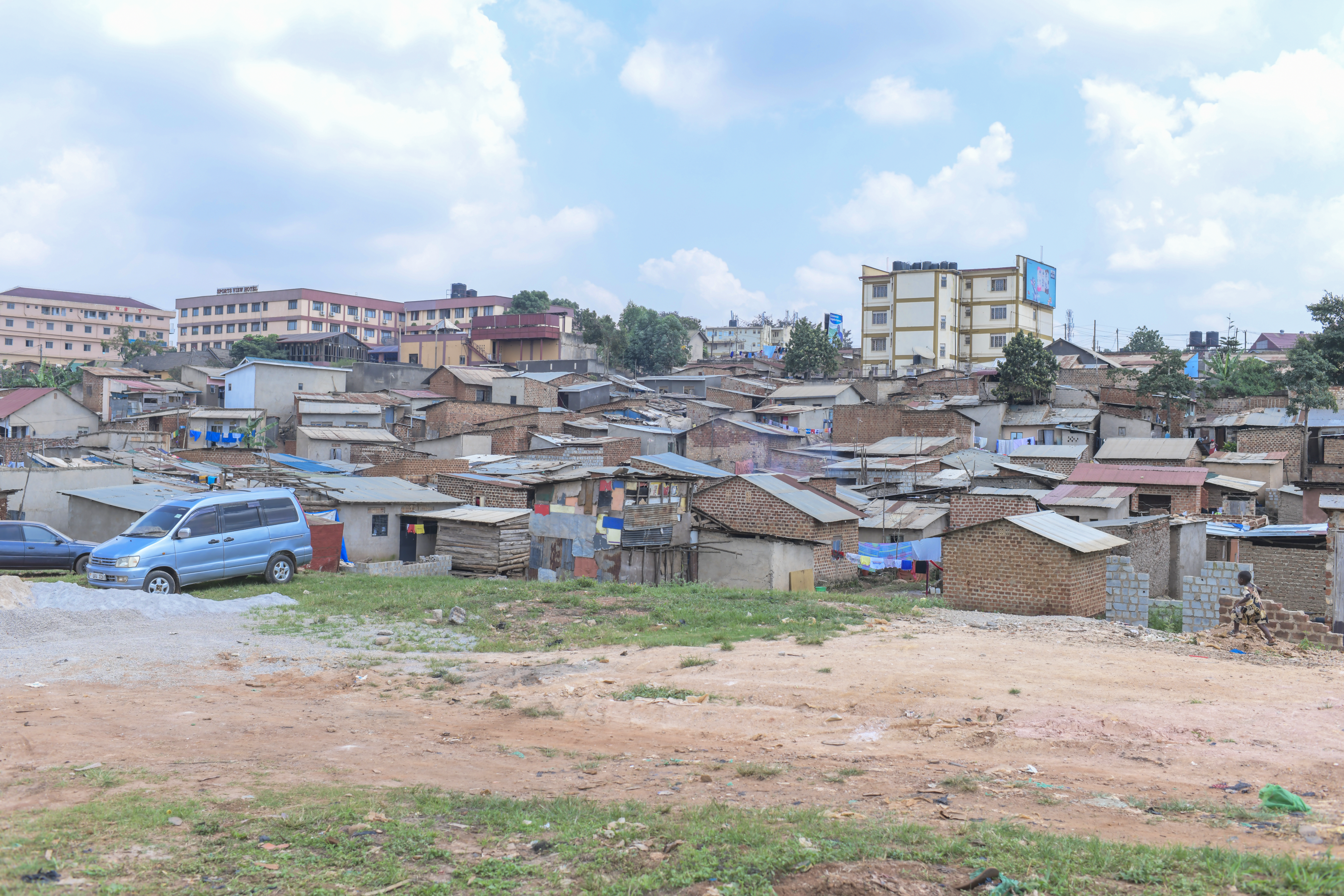
- Bweyogerere slums

- Location in Uganda
- Coordinates: 00°21′09″N 32°39′49″E
- Country: Uganda
- District: Wakiso District
- Municipality: Kira, Uganda
- Elevation: 3,900 ft (1,200 m)

Bweyogerere is one of the six townships or wards that constitute Kira Municipality in Wakiso District in southern central Uganda. The other five wards are Kimwaanyi, Kira, Kireka, Kirinnya and Kyaliwajjala.

== Location ==
Bweyogerere is located on the Kampala-Jinja Highway, approximately 12 kilometres (7.5 mi), east of Kampala, Uganda's capital and largest city. The coordinates of the township are:0°21'09.0"N 32°39'49.0"E (Latitude:0.352500; Longitude:32.663611).

== Overview ==
Bweyogerere is on a hill that rises to a peak of 1,200 metres (3,900 ft) above sea level. Mandela National Stadium is located in the southwestern corner of Bweyogerere, on the southern side of the Kampala–Jinja Highway. Kampala Industrial and Business Park, one of the designated industrial areas within the greater Kampala Metropolitan Area is in Namanve, to the east and southeast of Bweyogerere. The Kampala Northern Bypass Highway, a 21-kilometre (13 mi) dual carriageway road forming an arc around the northern half of the city of Kampala, leaves the Kampala-Jinja Highway at Bweyogerere and begins a winding journey that ends in Busega on the Kampala–Mityana Road.

== Population ==
During the 2002 national census, Bweyogerere constituted 26.7 percent of the population of Kira Municipality. In 2014, the national household and population census enumerated the population of Kira Municipality at 317,157.

== Points of interest ==
The following additional points of interest lie within Bweyogerere township or close to its borders:

(1) Kampala Business and Industrial Park: A designated industrial area measuring 894 hectares (2,210 acres). (2) Bweyogerere central market. (3) Bweyogerere Mosque. (4) Kampala-Jinja Highway traverses the township in an east/west direction. (5) Railway line traversing the neighborhood in a west to east direction.

== See also ==
- Central Region, Uganda
- Kira Town
