= Kira Town =

Town in Central Region of Uganda

- Location in Uganda
- Coordinates: 00°23′50″N 32°38′20″E
- Country: Uganda
- Region: Central Region
- District: Wakiso District
- Parliamentary Constituency: Kira Municipality

Government
  - Mayor: Julius Mutebi Nsubuga
  - Member of Parliament: Ibrahim Ssemujju Nganda

Area
  - Total: 38.16 sq mi (98.83 km^{2})
- Elevation: 3,900 ft (1,190 m)

Population (2014 Census)
  - Total: 317,157
  - Density: 4,712/sq mi (1,819.3/km^{2})

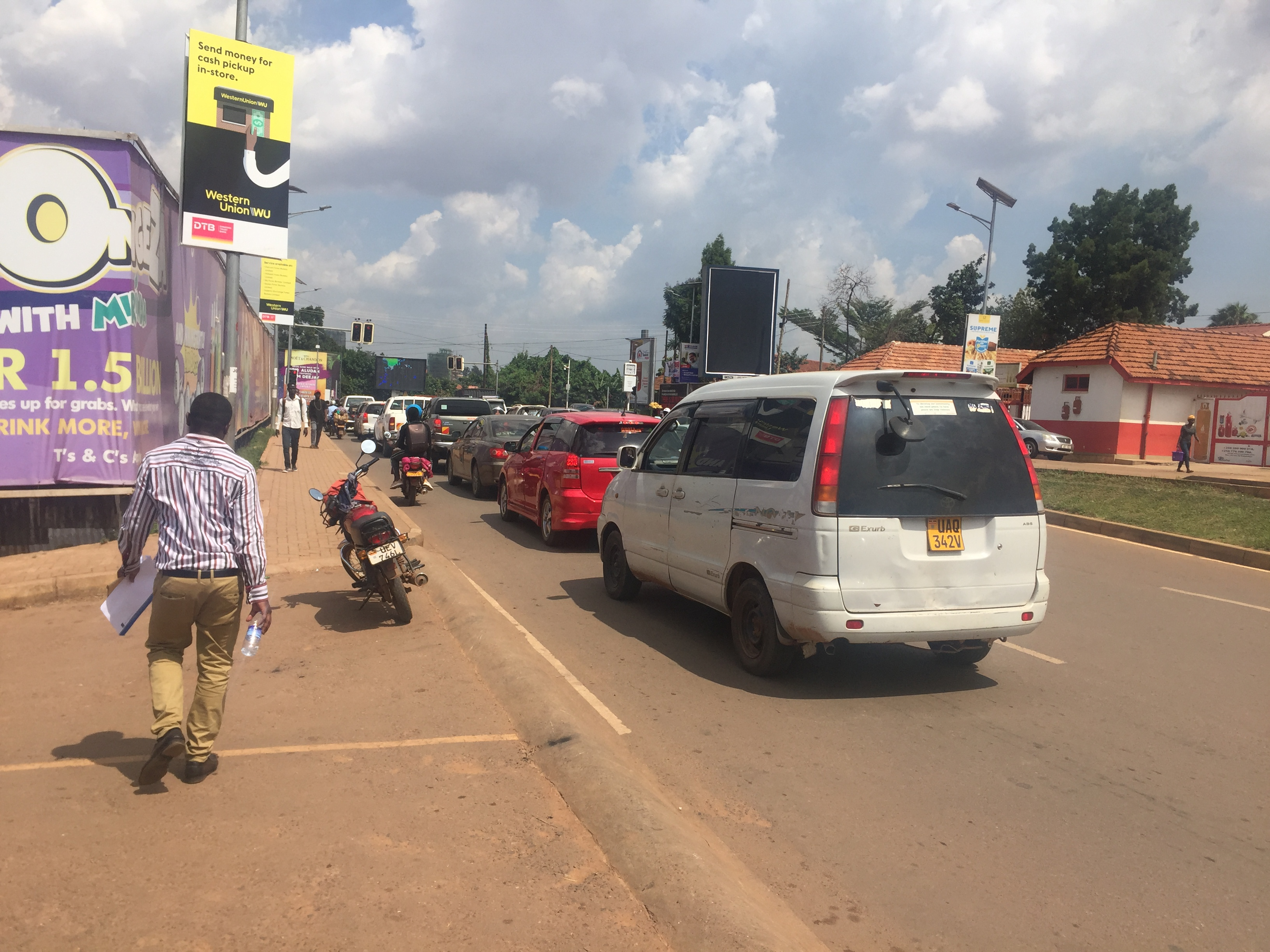
Kira road.

Kira Town, a municipality in the Wakiso District of the Central Region of Uganda, is the country's second most populous city. It is administered by the Kira Town Council, an urban local government.

== Location ==
Kira town council was elevated to Municipal level by an Act of Parliament and became operational in financial year 2016/2017 under vote 781. Kira Municipality is bordered by Gayaza to the north, Mukono to the east, Lake Victoria to the south, Kampala to the west, and Kasangati to the north-west. The town is approximately 15 kilometres (9 mi) north-east of the central business district of Kampala, Uganda's capital and largest city. The coordinates of the town are 0°23'50.0"N, 32°38'26.0"E (Latitude:0.397237; Longitude:32.640557). The town is approximately 98 square kilometres (24,000 acres) in size.

== Administration ==
Kira Municipality is made up of three divisions of Namugongo, Kira and Bweyogere which are further divided into six administrative parishes. These are:

- Bweyogerere
- Kimwanyi
- Kira
- Kireka
- Kirinnya
- Kyaliwajjala

The political Head of the Municipality was His Worship the Mayor. Julius Mutebi Nsubuga from 2016 to 2026 when He lost to Allan Dantine Bulamu. Technically the Head is Mr. Yiga Benon as the Municipal Town Clerk. Each Division is politically led by the Chairperson and a Senior Assistant Town Clerk as the Technical Head at that level. The supreme policy-making organ is the Municipal Council, which was initially composed of 17 elected Council, later in 2021 increased to 80 and in 2026 reduced to 40 councillors.

== Population ==
Kira Municipality is the largest town (municipality) in Uganda by population. The town is the second-largest urban center in the country, after Kampala.

The population of Kira Town has grown at a relatively rapid rate compared to the national average over the last decade. Part of the rapid growth is attributable to the town's proximity to Kampala. Kira is a bedroom community for Kampala.

The national census in 2002 estimated Kira's population to be 140,774 people, of whom 67,222 (47.8 percent) were males and 73,548 (52.2 percent) were females. The Uganda Bureau of Statistics estimated the mid-year 2010 population to be 172,300 and the mid-year 2011 population to be 179,800. The town planner, however, estimated the population to be 300,000 in 2010. In August 2014, the national population census put the population at 317,157. In 2020, UBOS estimated the population of Kira Town to be 462,900 people. The population agency calculated that the population of the municipality grew at an average rate of 6.68 percent annually, between 2014 and 2020.

Historical population
Year	Pop.	±%
2002	124,067	—
2014	317,157	+155.6%
2020	462,900	+46.0%

== Economic activities ==
A large number of young adults are engaged in boda boda (motorcycle and bicycle) for-hire transportation. Increasingly, residents of Kira Town are employed in salaried and non-salaried positions in the city of Kampala and return to Kira in the evenings to sleep. The Kampala Industrial and Business Park, an 894-hectare (2,210-acre) business development park developed by the Uganda Investment Authority at a cost of about US$180 million (about UGX:470.5 billion), is located at Namanve in Bweyogerere Ward in extreme southeastern Kira Town.

Kiira Motors Corporation or KMC is a state enterprise in Uganda established to champion the development of the domestic automotive value chain for job and wealth creation and commercialize the Kiira Electric Vehicle Project.

== Sites of interest ==
=== Basilica of the Uganda Martyrs at Namugongo ===
The Catholic Basilica of the Uganda Martyrs has been built at Namugongo in Kyaliwajjala Ward, where the majority of the 22 Catholic Uganda Martyrs (now Saints) were burned alive on the orders of Ssekabaka Mwanga II in the late 19th century. An Anglican shrine, administered by the Church of Uganda, is about 5 kilometres (3.1 mi) east of the basilica, at the site where another group of martyrs were murdered for their beliefs.

=== Kabaka's Palace at Kireka ===
Kabaka Ronald Muwenda Mutebi II and the Nnabagereka of Buganda, Sylvia Nagginda, maintain a palace on Kireka Hill, in Kireka Ward.

=== Mandela National Stadium ===
Mandela National Stadium is the largest stadium in Uganda, with a sitting capacity of 45,202 people. It is at Namboole, in Bweyogerere Ward.

== Infrastructure ==
=== Kampala Northern Bypass Highway ===
The Kampala Northern Bypass Highway, also referred to as the Northern Bypass, is the first dual-carriage interstate highway to be built in Uganda. It forms an incomplete circle around the north-east, north, and north-west of the city of Kampala. The northern and eastern portion of the highway traverses Bweyogerere and Kireka wards, in Kira Town.

=== Umeme electricity substation ===
In 2015, the electricity distribution company Umeme built a 40 megaVolt-ampere substation in the Nsasa neighborhood of Kira Town, at a cost of US$7 million (UGX:24 billion). This substation is expected to stabilize the electricity grid and reduce power losses in this fast-growing urban area. Constructing the substation cost US$5 million, while US$2 million was spent on the erection of feeder lines.

=== Other public health issues ===
The Public Health Department of Kira Municipality is determined to improve the living conditions of its citizens, through detailed attention to sanitation, provision of safe drinking water, safe disposal of human and other waste, and the maintenance of hygiene in schools, markets, and other public places. Plans are underway to formulate minimum acceptable hygiene standards for private and public buildings and open spaces.

=== Poverty eradication ===
Efforts are underway to assist citizens in starting income-producing activities, including growing mushrooms.

=== Education ===
In January 2011, the Shimoni Core Primary Teachers' College opened at Kitikifumba village in Kira Town. The college, formerly located on Nakasero Hill in Kampala, was established by the British government in 1952. In 2006, the former location was sold to an investor to construct the Kampala Intercontinental Hotel. The new location occupies 25 acres (10 ha). The facilities can accommodate approximately 450 students, costing approximately UGX:8 billion to build.

In 2011, St. Augustine International University (SAIU), a private, multi-campus university, received a provisional license from the Uganda National Council for Higher Education. SAIU is one of a number of private universities accredited between 2010 and 2014. It maintains a campus at Namugongo, where it hosts its College of Agriculture and Veterinary Medicine.

== Notable people ==
- Arthur Sserwanga – Professor, accountant, entrepreneur, and academic administrator, is a native son. Vice chancellor of Muteesa I Royal University.
- Hakim Sendagire – Professor, physician, microbiologist, biochemist, and academic administrator. Dean of Habib Medical School.

== See also ==
- List of cities and towns in Uganda

== Photos ==
- Photo of Mandela National Stadium
- Photo of Kampala Northern Bypass Highway
