= Wakiso District =

- District
- District location in Uganda
- Coordinates: 00°24′N 32°29′E
- Country: Uganda
- Region: Central Uganda
- Capital: Wakiso

Area
  - Total: 1,906.7 km^{2} (736.2 sq mi)
  - Land: 1,906.7 km^{2} (736.2 sq mi)
- Elevation: 1,200 m (3,900 ft)

Population (2020 Estimate)
  - Total: 2,915,200
  - Density: 1,528.9/km^{2} (3,959.9/sq mi)
- Time zone: UTC+3 (EAT)
- Website: www.wakiso.go.ug

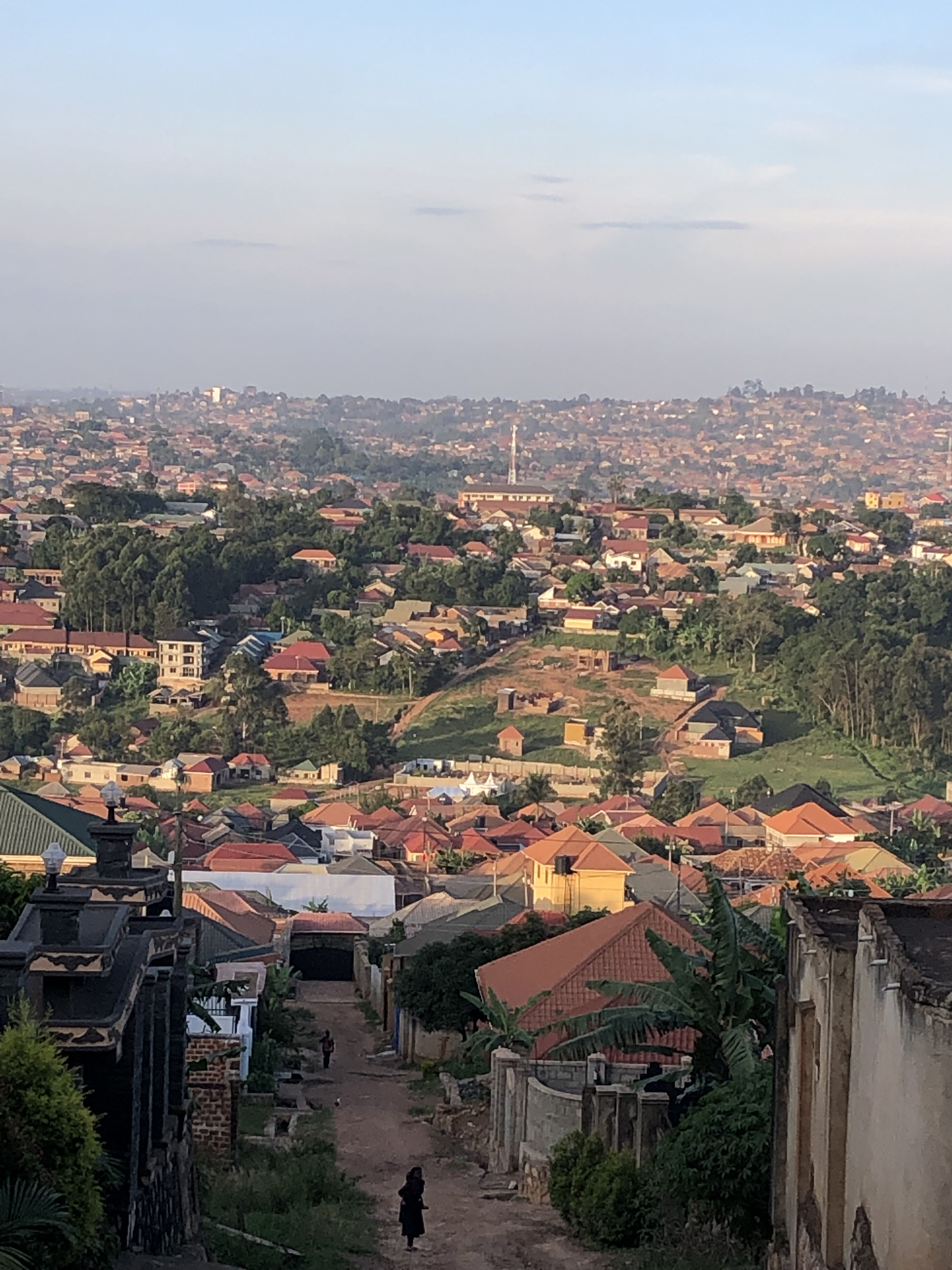
A view of Nansana from Kabulengwa Hill in Wakiso district, Uganda.

Wakiso District is a district in the Central Region of Uganda that partly encircles Kampala, Uganda's capital city. Formed in 2000 out of Mpigi District, the district was created after merging the six major counties of Busiro, Kyaddondo, Entebbe Municipality, Nansana Municipality, Kira Municipality and Makindye-Sabagabo Municipality. The town of Wakiso is the site of the district headquarters. Kira, the country's second largest city and suburb of Kampala, is in the district.

The district was first governed by Eng. Ian Kyeyune who was later succeeded by Dr. Matia Lwanga Bwanika.

== Location ==
Wakiso District lies in the Central Region of the country, bordering Nakaseke District and Luweero District to the north, Mukono District to the east, Kalangala District in Lake Victoria to the south, Mpigi District to the southwest and Mityana District to the northwest. The town of Wakiso, where the district headquarters are located, lies approximately 20 kilometres (12 mi) northwest of Kampala, the capital of Uganda and the largest city in the country. The coordinates of the district are: 00 24N, 32 29E.

== Demographics ==
In 1991, the national population census estimated the district population at 562,887. According to the 2002 national census figures, Wakiso District had a population of 907,988, making it the second-most populated district in the country. At that time, 53 percent of the population were children below the age of 18 years and 17 percent of the population were orphans. The national census and household survey of 2014 enumerated 1,997,418 people in the district. The Uganda Bureau of Statistics (UBOS) estimated the total population in the district, as of mid-year 2020 at 2,915,000. UBOS also calculated that the district population increased at an average annual rate of 6.7 percent, between 2014 and 2020.

Historical population
Year	Pop.	±%
1991	562,887	—
2002	907,988	+61.3%
2014	1,997,418	+120.0%
2020	2,915,200	+45.9%

According to the preliminary 2024 Census results, the population is approximately 3.3 million people, comprising about 51% females and 49% males, thus making the district almost the dormitory of the Metropolitan areas.

== Administrative units ==
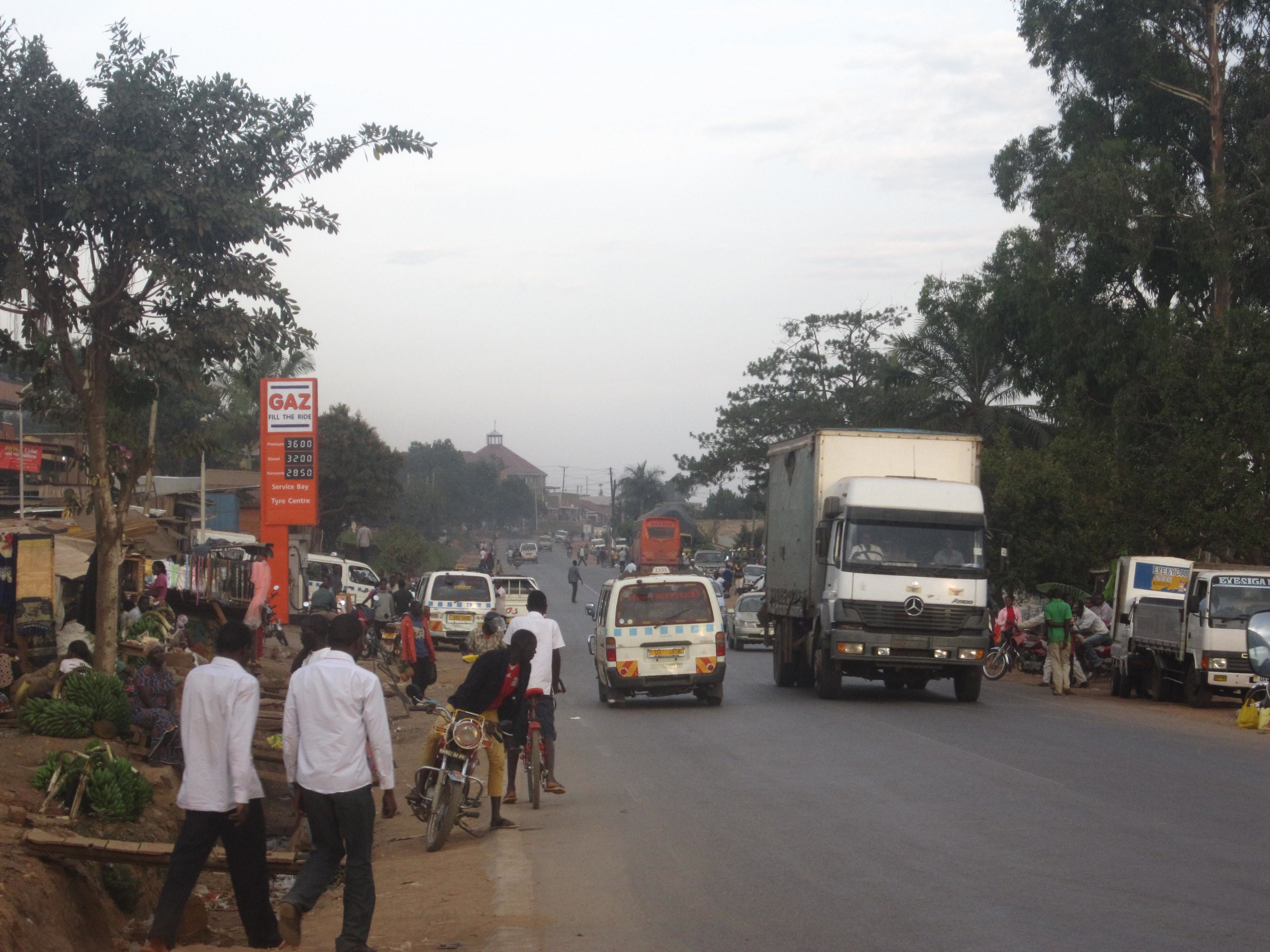
Bombo road in Matugga - Mabanda (Wakiso District)

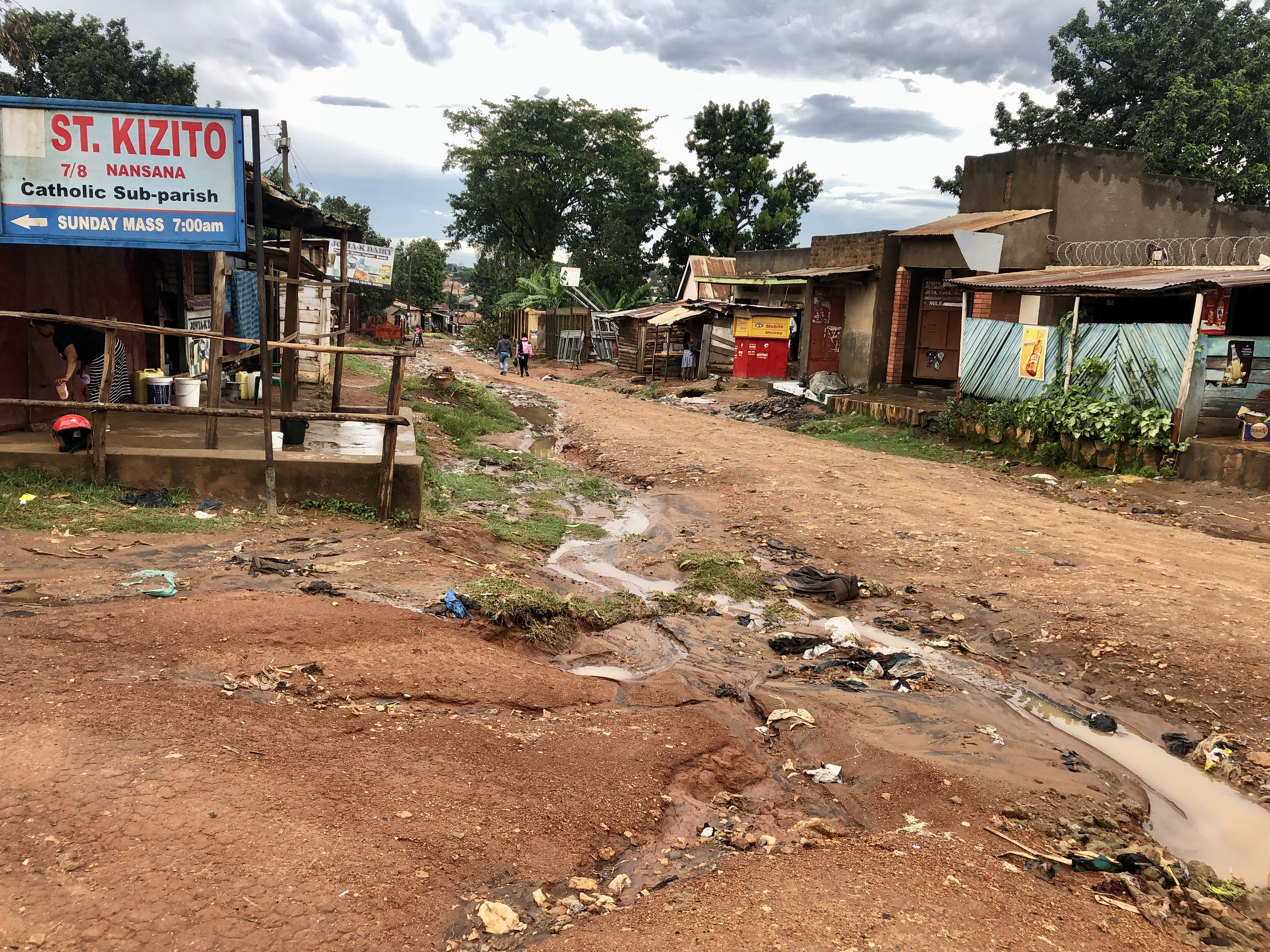
Drainage in Nansana Yesu Amala - Wakiso district

Wakiso District comprises two counties, Kyadondo and Busiro Counties, and four municipalities: Entebbe, Makindye-Ssabagabo, Nansana and Kira. Entebbe City was split off and granted city status in 2020 after the 10th Parliamentary resolution but has never been operationalised. The district is further subdivided into 27 lower administrative units:

1. Masulita Subcounty
2. Namayumba Subcounty
3. Kakiri Town
4. Katabi Town
5. Kasanje Town
6. Kira Municipal Council
7. Makindye Ssabagabo Municipal Council
8. Masuliita Town Council
9. Mende Subcounty
10. Namayumba Subcounty
11. Kasangati (includes Gayaza and Kasangati)
12. Nansana Municipal Council
13. Kyengera Town Council
14. Bussi SubCounty
15. Wakiso Town Council
16. Entebbe Municipal Council
17. Kajjansi Town Council
18. Busukumu Subcounty
19. Ssisa Subcounty
20. Gombe Subcounty
21. Nabweru Subcounty
22. Nangabo Subcounty
23. Nsangi Subcounty
24. Wakiso Town
25. Wakiso Subcounty

The district headquarters are located in Wakiso Town, Wakiso Subcounty approximately 20 kilometres (12 mi) northwest of Kampala on the highway to Hoima. Wakiso District has a total area of 2,704 square kilometres (1,044 mi^{2}).

== District leadership ==
The leadership is entrusted in the District Executive Council, composed of:

- District Chairman - Dr. Matia Lwanga Bwanika
- District Vice Chairman - Betinah Nantege
- District Secretary for Finance -
- District Secretary for Production & Natural Resources
- District Secretary for Works & Technical Services
- District secretary Gender
- Resident District Commissioner - Justine Mbabazi
- Deputy Resident District Commissioner

== Tourist attractions ==
The tourist attractions in the district include:

- Buganda Cultural Sites and Kabaka's Palaces
- Old Entebbe Town
- Entebbe Botanical Gardens
- Uganda Wildlife Education Center (UWEC) - Entebbe
- Entebbe International Airport
- State House - Entebbe (the Official Residence of the President of Uganda)
- Ngamba Island Chimpanzee Sanctuary on Lake Victoria - Sanctuary for chimpanzees
- Bulago Resort Island
- Lake Victoria - the largest lake in Africa and the second largest fresh-water lake in the world
- Uganda Martyrs Shrine Basilica - Namugongo
- Mandela National Stadium - Namboole
- Entebbe International Airport
- Kasubi Tombs
- Ngamba Island Chimpanzee Sanctuary
- State House in Entebbe
- The Lake Victoria

== Economic activity ==
- Fishing
- Transport and Communication
- Poultry
- Cattle Raring
- Wholesale and Retail sales

== See also ==
- Districts of Uganda
- Lake Victoria
