= Kampala–Bombo Expressway =

Road in Uganda

Route information
- Length: 20.1 mi (32.3 km)
- History: Expected designation TBD; Expected completion TBD

Major junctions
- South end: Wandegeya
- Bwaise, Kawempe, Kawanda; Matugga 00°28′28″N 32°31′06″E
- North end: Bombo

Location
- Country: Uganda

Highway system
- Roads in Uganda

The Kampala–Bombo Expressway is a proposed four-lane, dual carriage highway in the Central Region of Uganda, connecting, Kampala, the capital city, and Bombo, in Luweero District.

== Location ==
The road starts at Wandegeya in the Kawempe Division of Kampala, Uganda's capital city. It continues north through Bwaise, Kawempe, and Matugga to end at Bombo, in Luweero District, a distance of approximately 32 kilometres (20 mi).

== Overview ==
The government of Uganda plans to widen the current bitumen-surfaced road to a four-lane dual carriage highway, as part of efforts to decongest Kampala. It is planned to fund the road construction under a public-private partnership (PPP) arrangement.

== Construction costs ==
As at February 2016, the construction budget for the highway has not been developed, pending finalization of road design.

== See also ==
- List of roads in Uganda
