= Kikaaya =

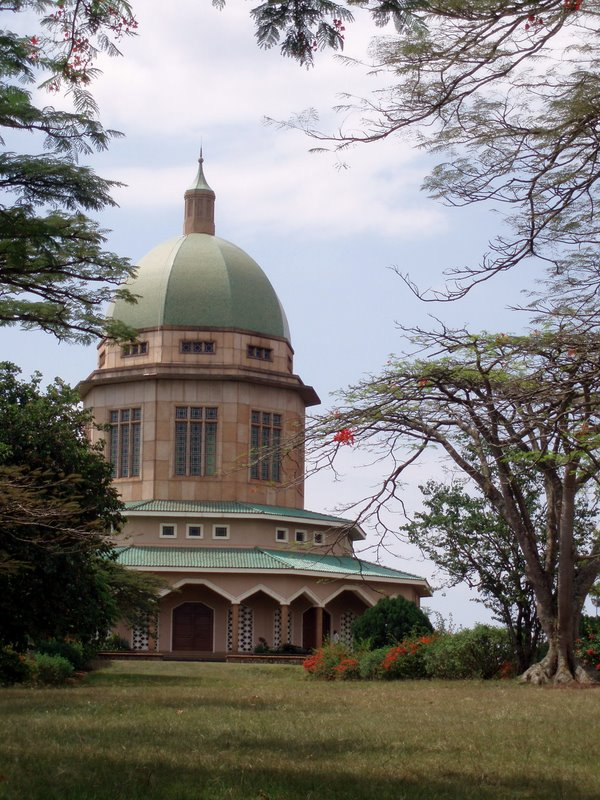
- Bahá'í Temple, Kikaaya

- Map of Kampala showing the location of Kikaaya.
- Coordinates: 00°21′54″N 32°35′24″E
- Country: Uganda
- Region: Central Uganda
- District: Kampala Capital City Authority
- Division: Kawempe Division
- Elevation: 1,240 m (4,070 ft)
- Time zone: UTC+3 (EAT)

Kikaaya is a neighborhood in the city of Kampala, Uganda's capital city. The correct phonetic spelling is with two 'a's after the second 'k'.

== Location ==
Kikaaya is located in Kawempe Division, in northern Kampala. It is bordered by Kisaasi to the north, Kulambiro to the northeast, Kigoowa to the east, Bukoto to the southeast, Kyebando to the southwest, Kanyanya to the west and Mpererwe to the northwest. This location lies approximately 7.5 kilometres (4.7 mi), by road, north of Kampala's central business district. The coordinates of Kikaaya are:0°21'54.0"N,32°35'24.0"E (Latitude:0.3650; Longitude:32.5900).

Kikaaya is situated on a hill that raises to a height of 1,240 metres (4,070 ft), above sea level. Most of the hill is occupied by the expanse of the Bahá’í Temple in Uganda. The temple, one of the existing seven continental Houses of Worship of the Baháʼí Faith in the world, sits on 50 acres (20 ha) which include the House of Worship, manicured gardens, a guest house, and an administrative center.

== Demographics ==
The neighborhood on the slopes of the hill is predominantly middle class and upscale. Large homes sit on large lots and gated communities with upper middle class housing estates occupy the slopes in between the large homes. The neighborhood is clean, with low crime rates.

== See also ==
- Kampala
- Kampala District
- Kawempe
- Kawempe Division
- Central Uganda
