= Aziz Kalungi Kasujja =

Ugandan civil servant (1939–2016)

Chairman of the Uganda Electoral Commission
- In office 1997–2002

Uganda's Ambassador to Saudi Arabia
- In office 2002–2011
- President: Yoweri Museveni

Personal details
- Born: 1939 Uganda
- Died: 17 April 2016 (aged 76–77) Kampala, Uganda
- Education: University of Dhaka
- Occupation: Civil servant, diplomat

Aziz Kalungi Kasujja (1939 – 17 April 2016) was a Ugandan who served as chairman of the Uganda Electoral Commission and later as Uganda's ambassador to Saudi Arabia.

== Education ==
Kasujja holds a bachelor's degree in Political Science from the University of Dacca (Dhaka University) in Pakistan.

== Career ==
After his university education, Kasujja entered public service and worked in Uganda's Ministry of Finance. From there, he served as a general manager at Libyan Arab Bank before becoming a commissioner on Uganda's Interim Electoral Commission (IEC), chaired by Stephen Akabway in 1996.

From 1997 and 2002, Kasujja served as the Electoral Commission chairperson. After retiring from the Commission in 2002, President Yoweri Museveni appointed him as Uganda's ambassador to Saudi Arabia, a role he filled until 2011, when he retired.

Kasujja was appointed by President Yoweri Museveni as one of the presidential nominees to Uganda's Constituent Assembly (CA), which debated and adopted the 1995 Constitution. He was also a presidential nominee to the National Resistance Council (NRC).

== Death ==
Kasujja died on 17 April 2016 after collapsing during a school meeting in Kawempe, Kampala. He was taken to Platinum Hospital in Wandegeya, where he died and was laid to rest at Mbulire village in Bigasa Sub County in Bukomansimbi District.
