= Katanga Slum =

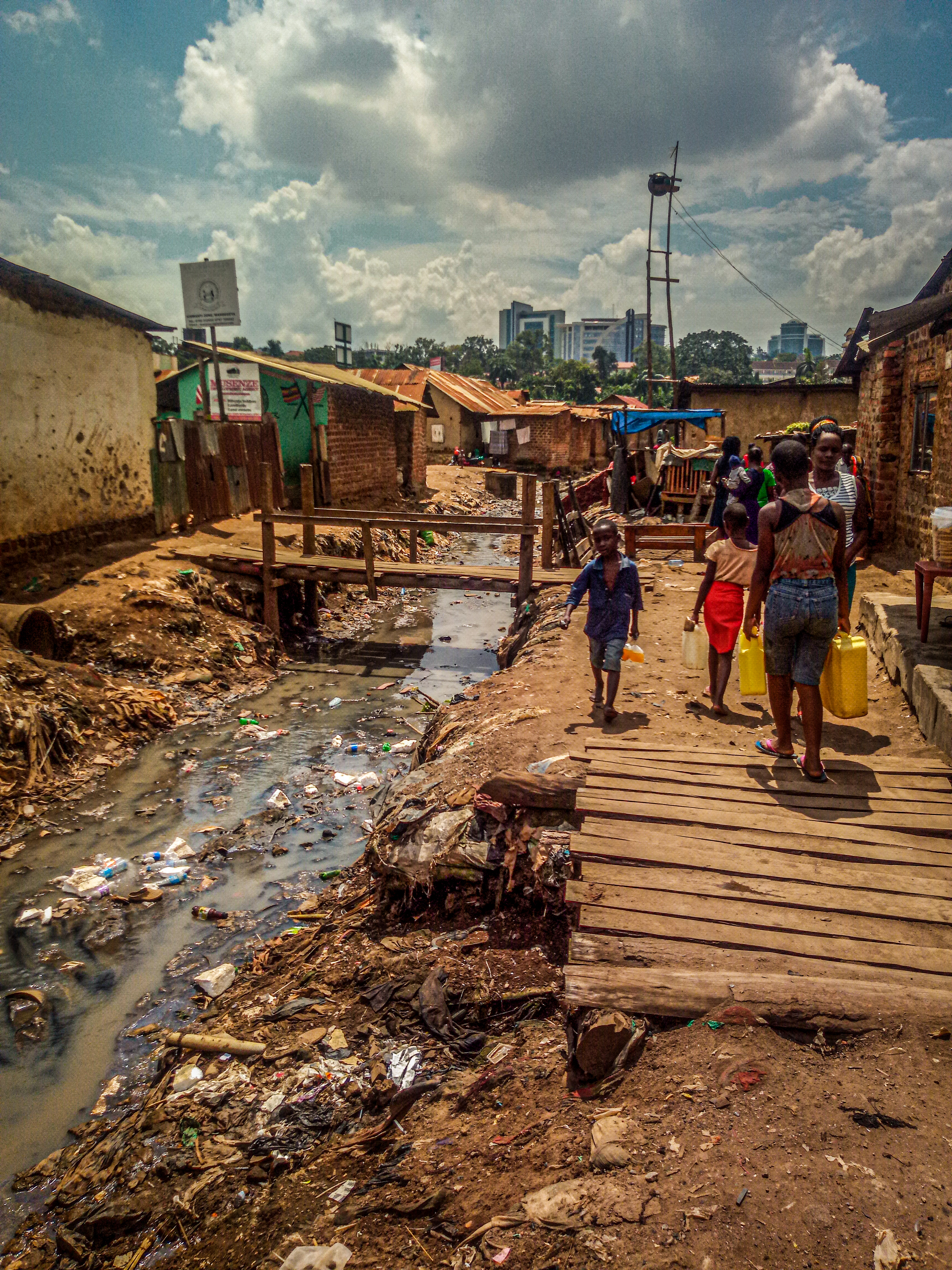
- Interactive map of Katanga Slum
- Coordinates: 0°20′10″N 32°34′27″E
- Country: Uganda
- Region: Central Uganda
- District: Kampala District
- Division: Kampala Central Division
- Time zone: EAT

Katanga Slum is a settlement located in the valley between Mulago Hospital and Makerere University, in Uganda's capital city, Kampala.

== Location ==
Katanga slum is located in Kawempe Division. It is bordered by Bwaise to the north, Mulago to the east, Wandegeya to the west, and Nakasero to the south.

== Overview ==
Katanga slum stretches about 1.5 kilometres from Wandegeya to Kubiri, near Bwaise. Katanga is divided into two administrative Local Council 1 zone, "Busia zone" and "Kimwanyi zone". It is developed with students hostels as viewed from Wandegeya, and temporary structures built with timber or mud and bricks. The temporary structures are mostly close to Mulago hospital.

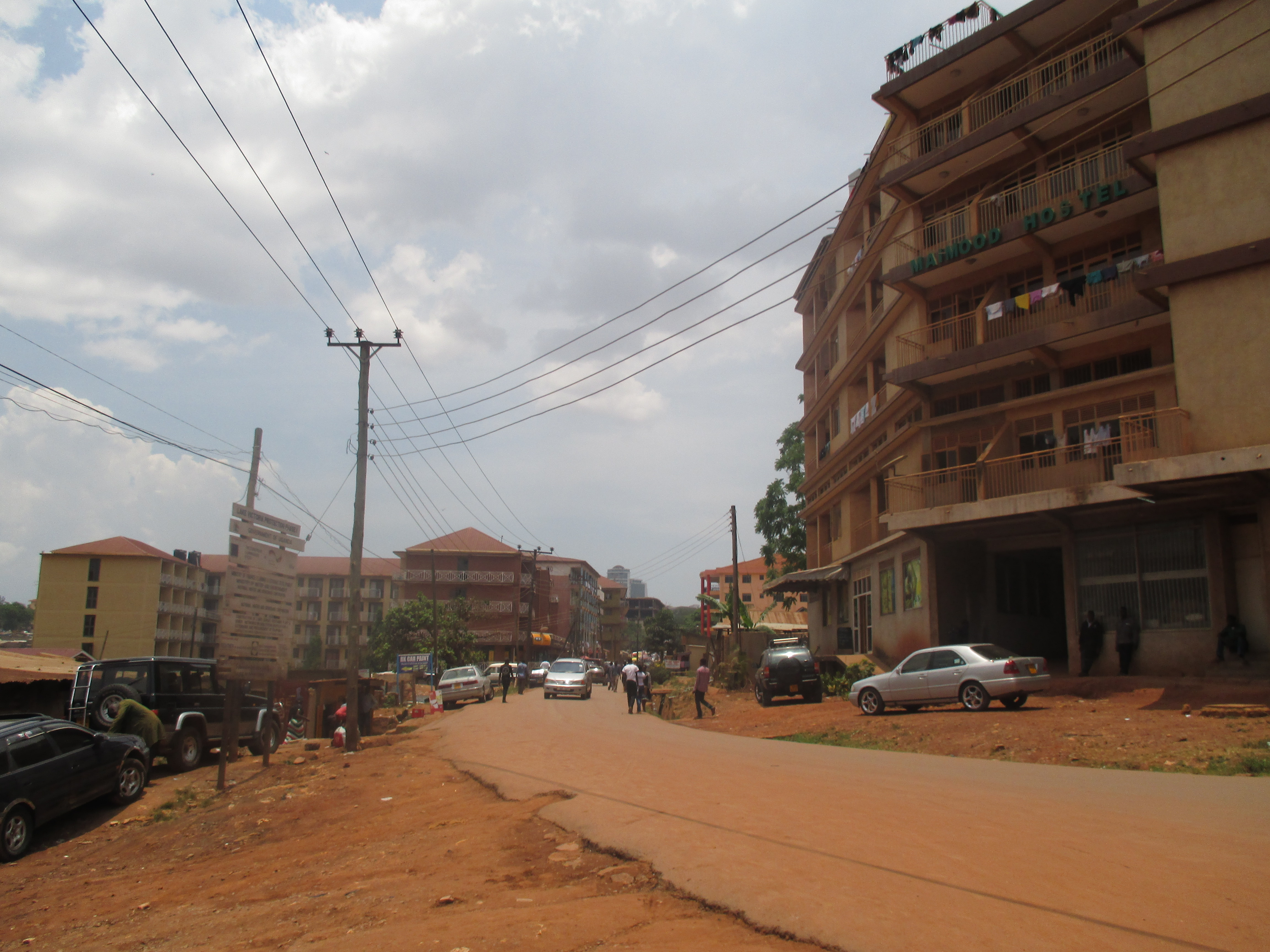
Hostels in Katanga

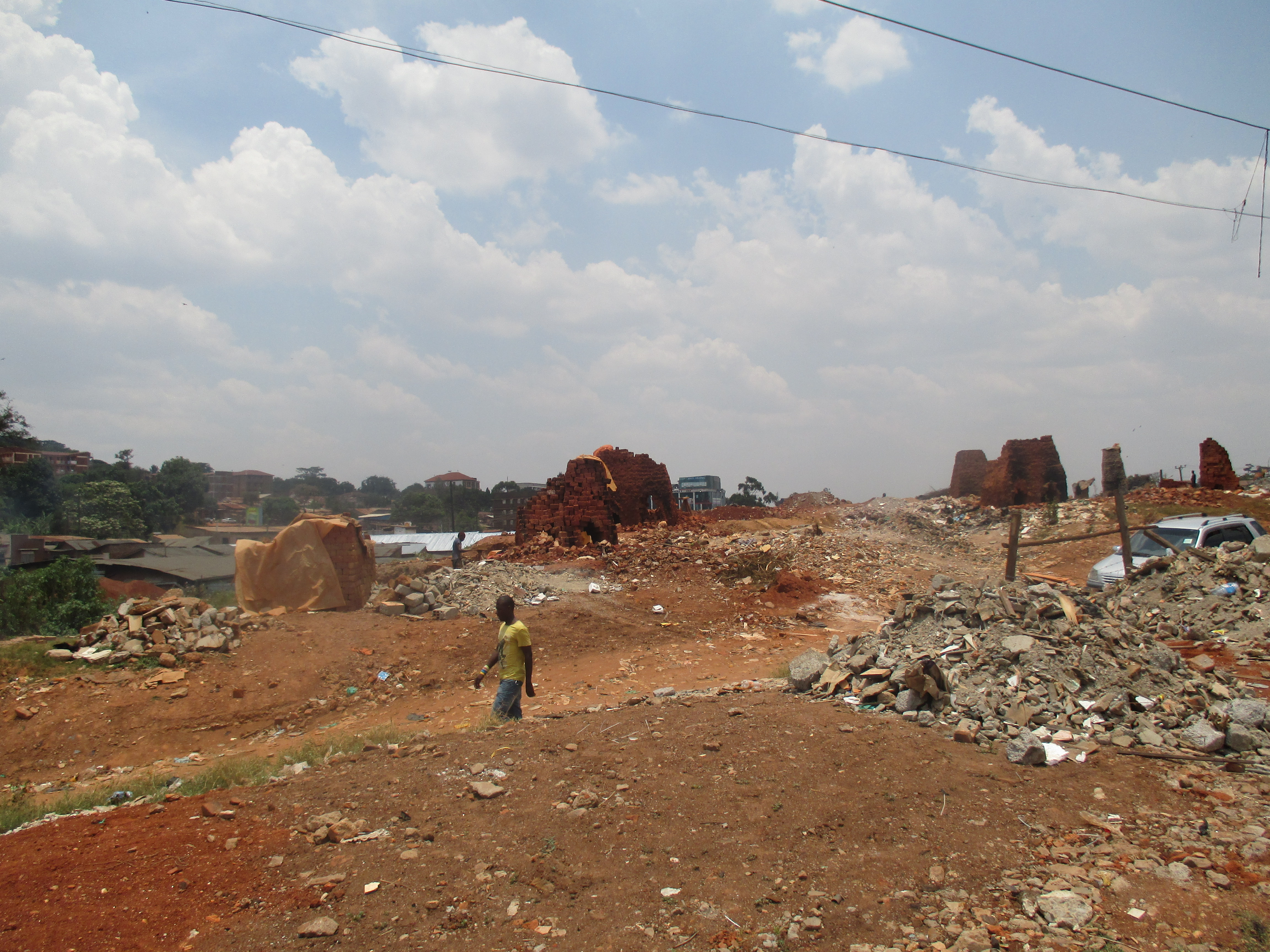
Brick making in Katanga

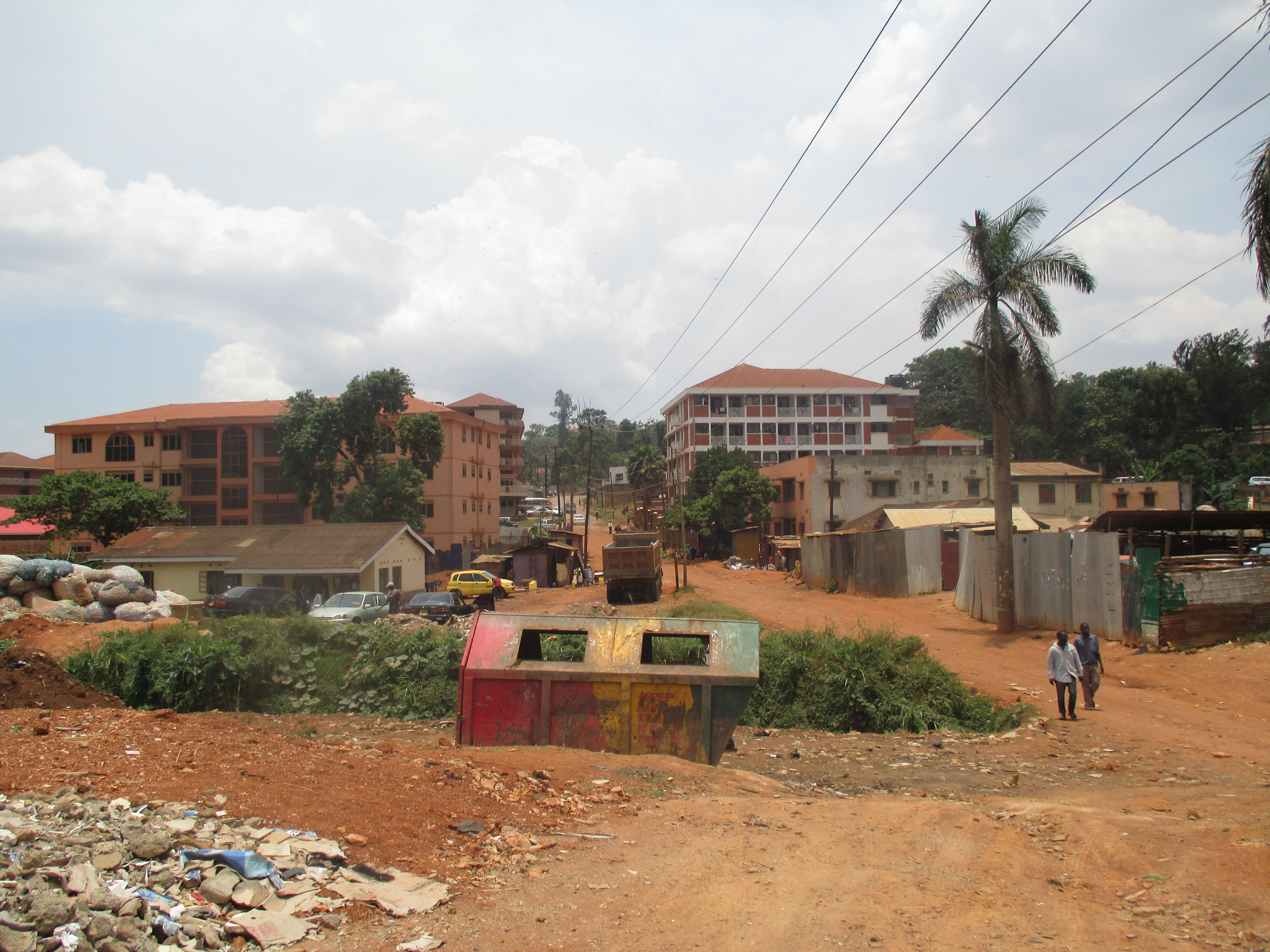
Katanga 2

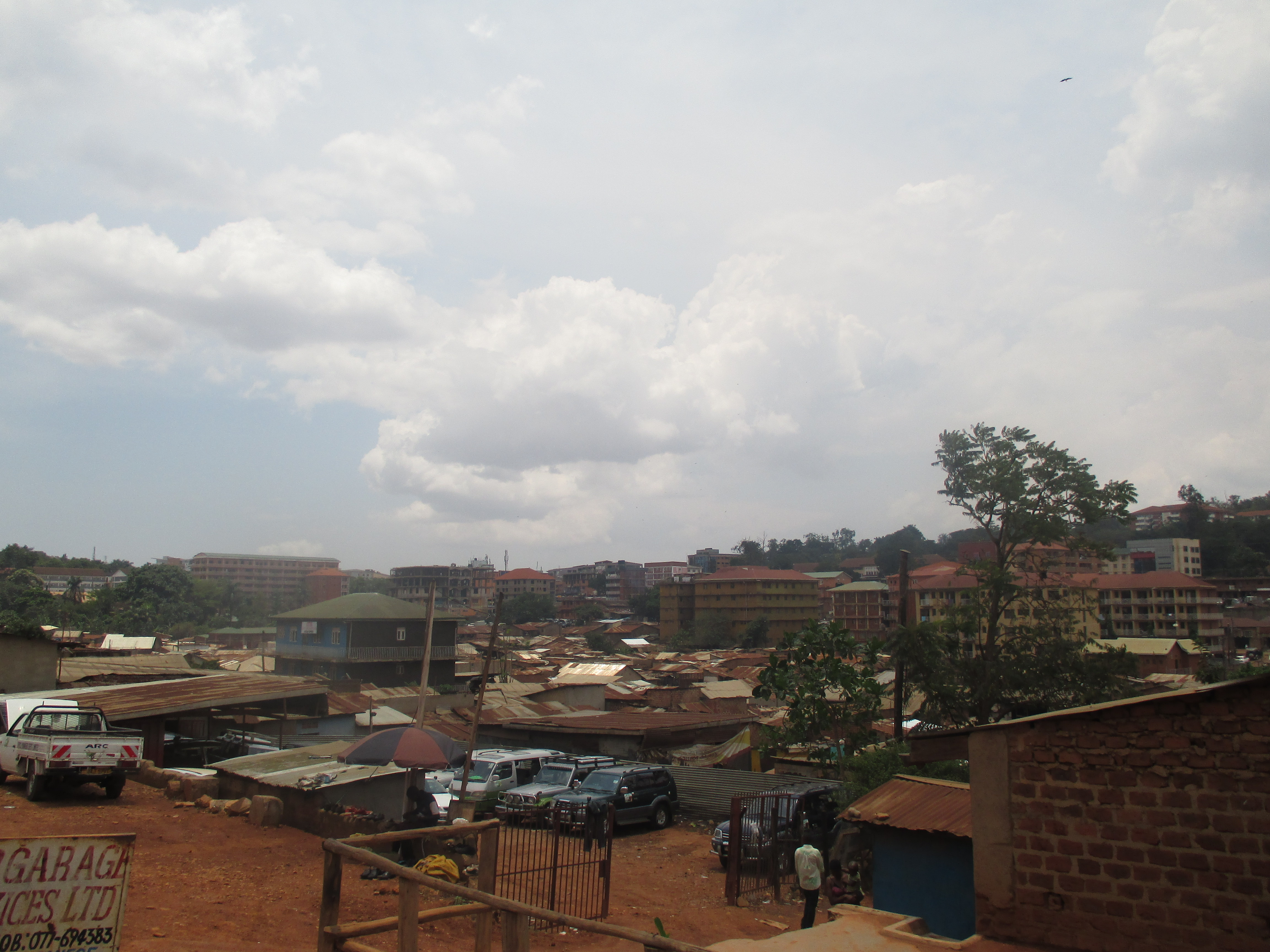
Katanga 3

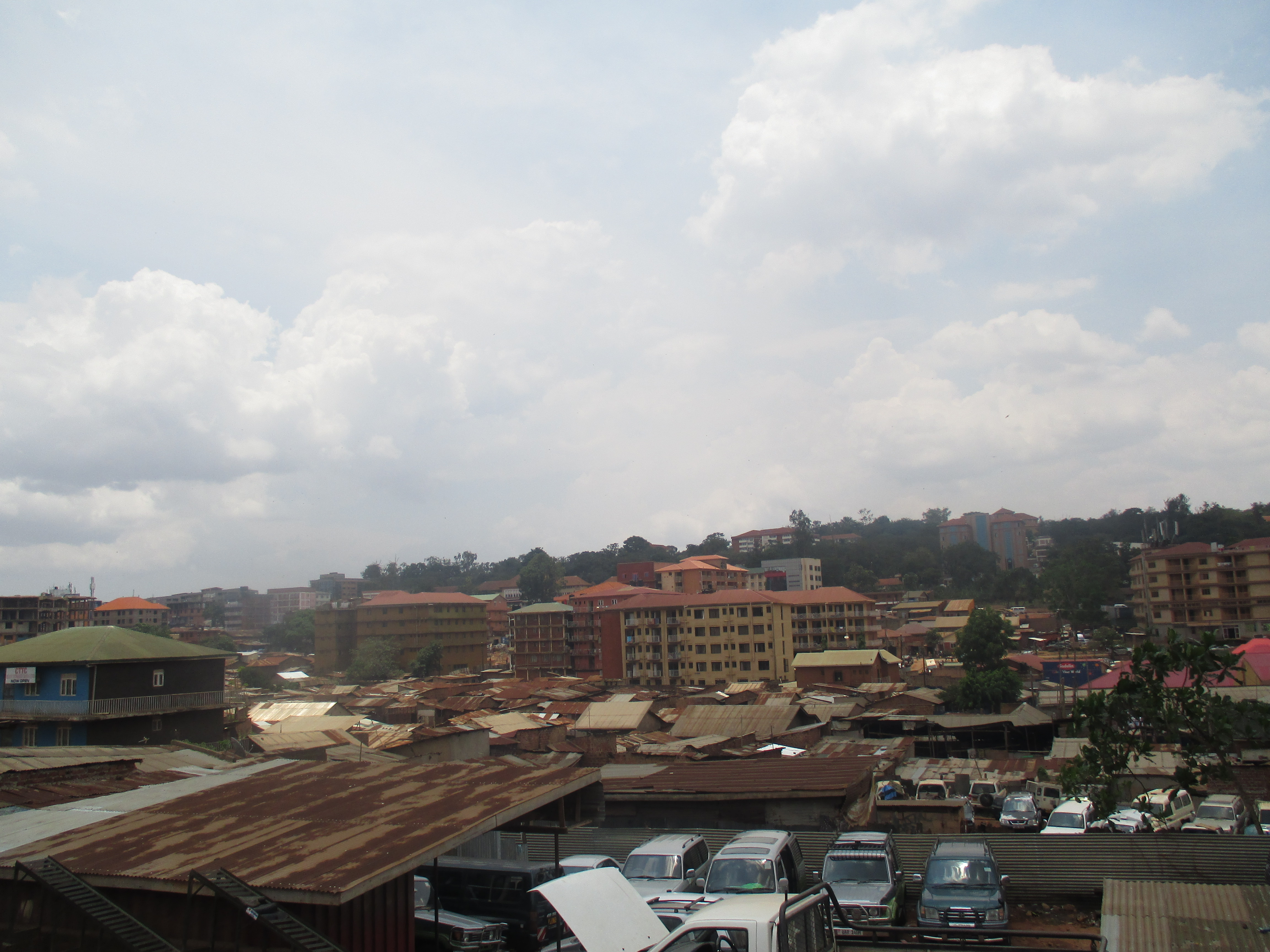
Katanga from Mulago

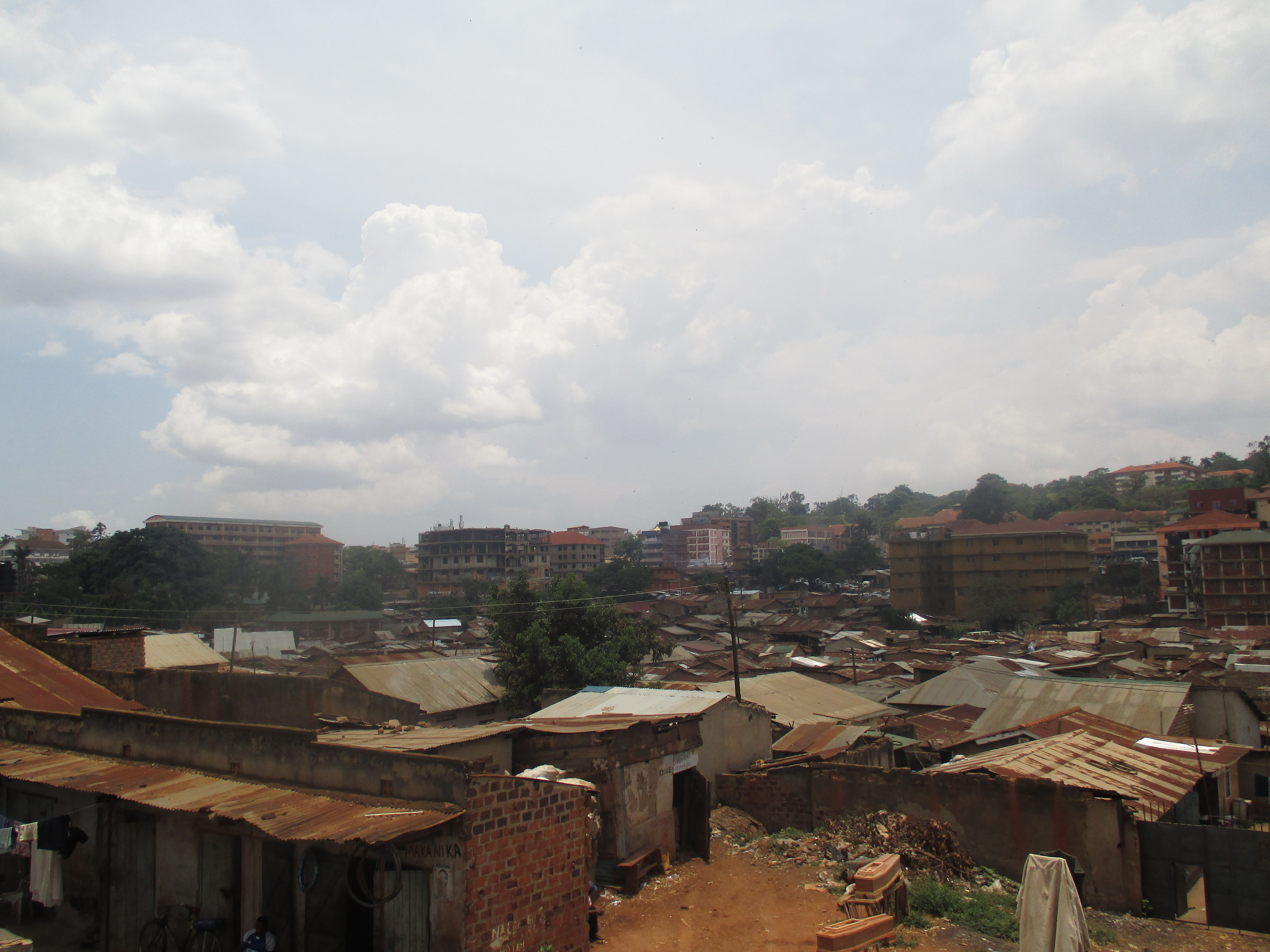
Katanga from Mulago

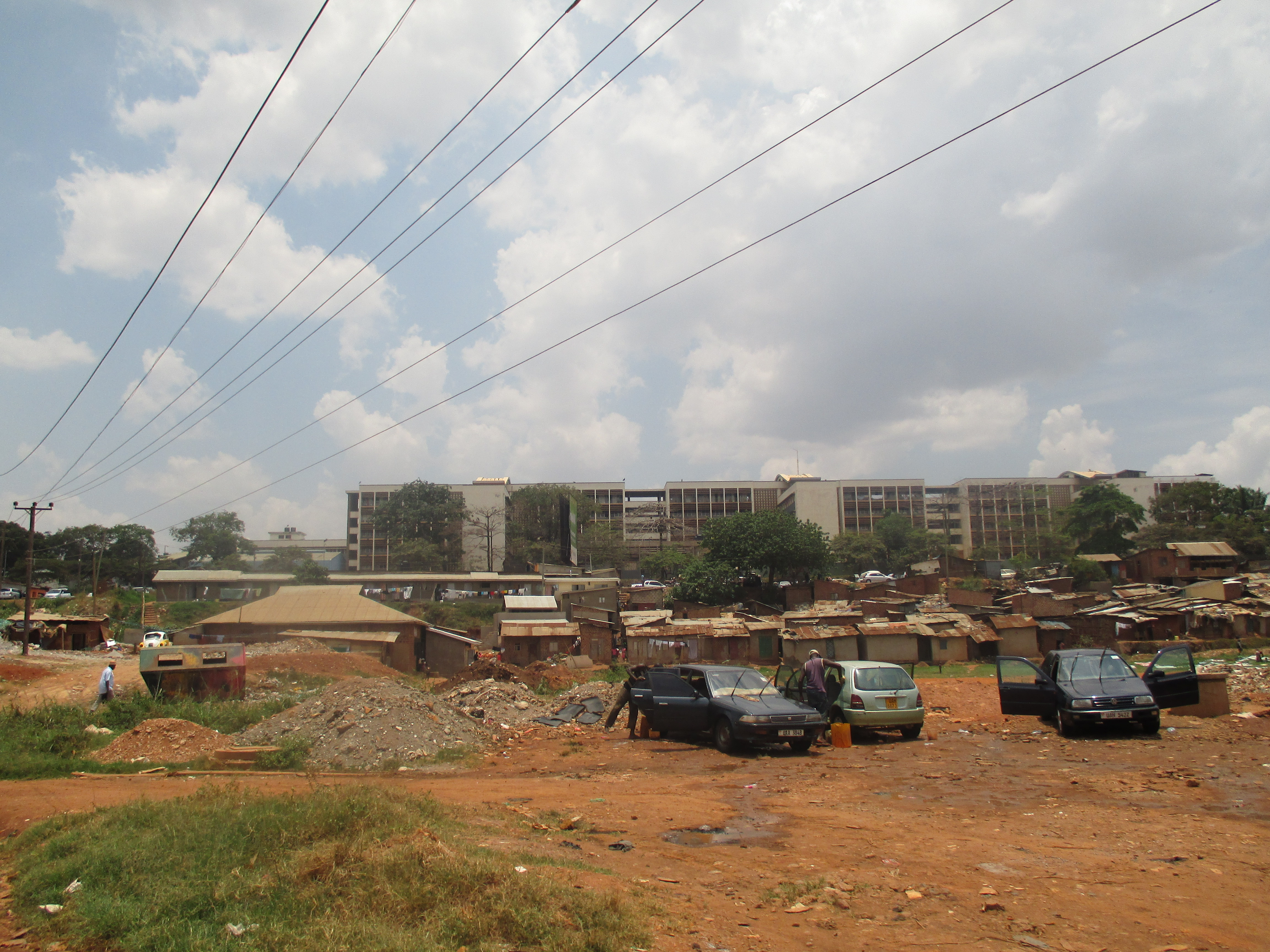
Katanga near Mulago

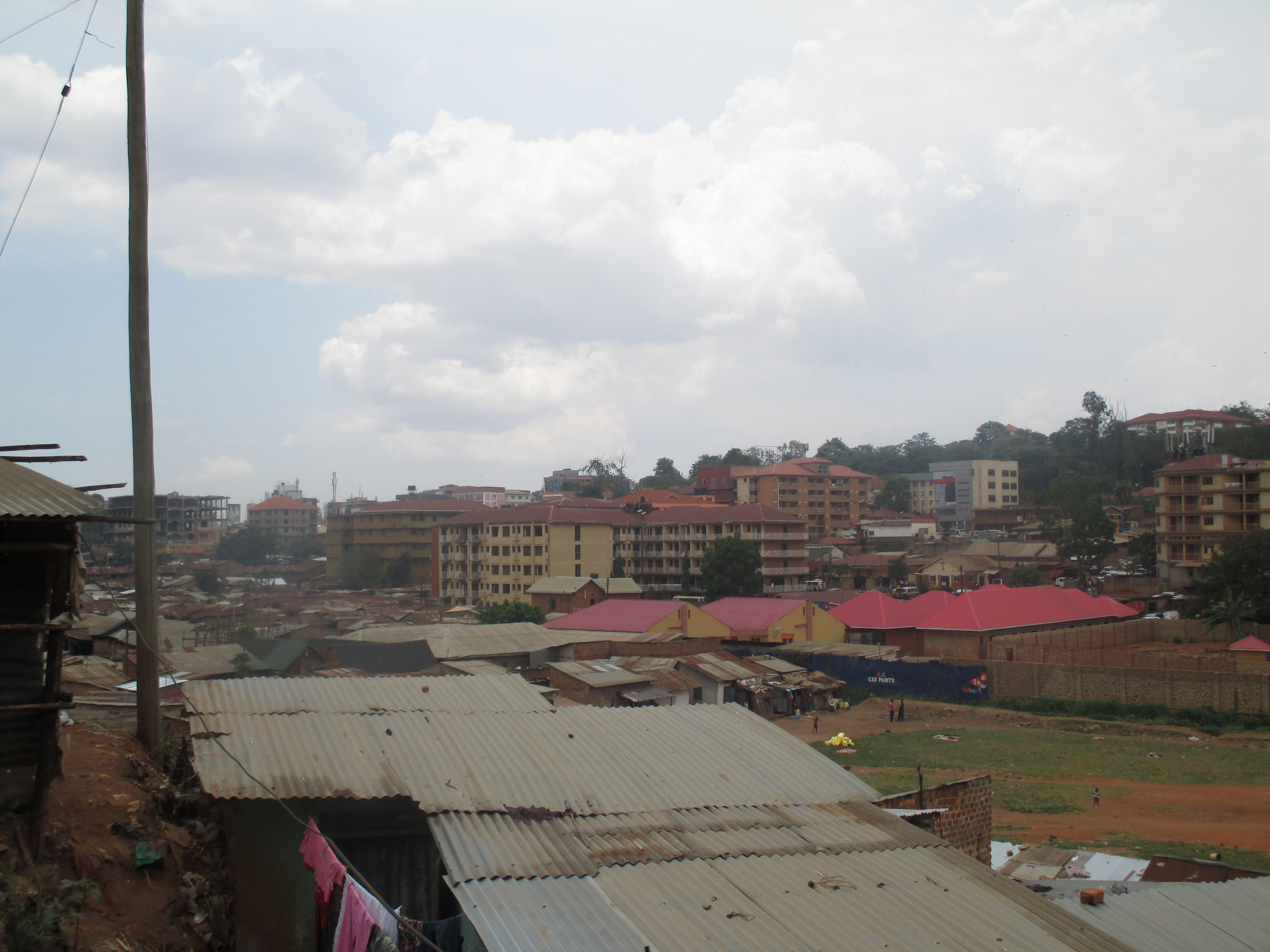
Katanga showing hostels and mud houses

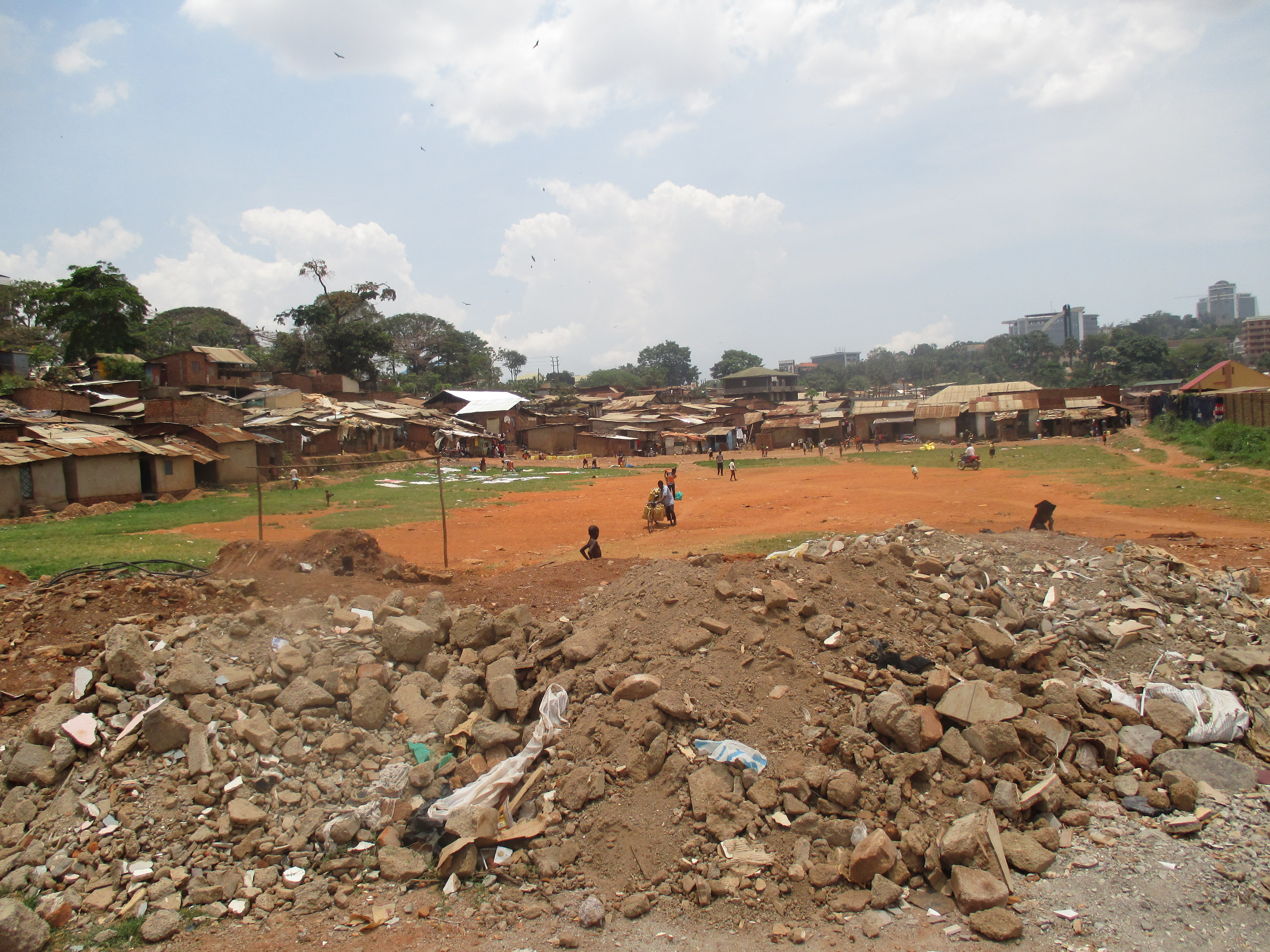
Katanga with a playground

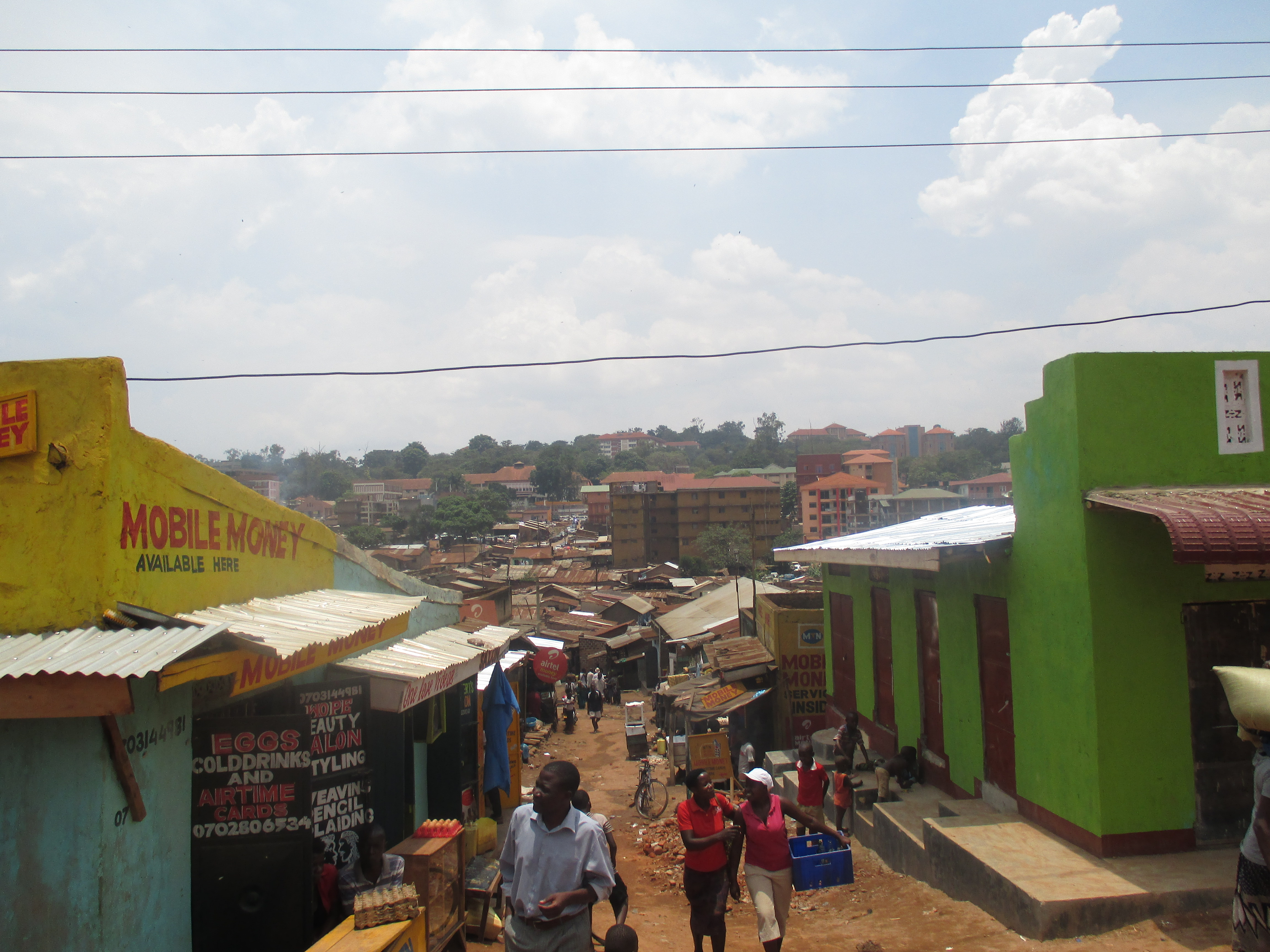
Shops in katanga near Mulago

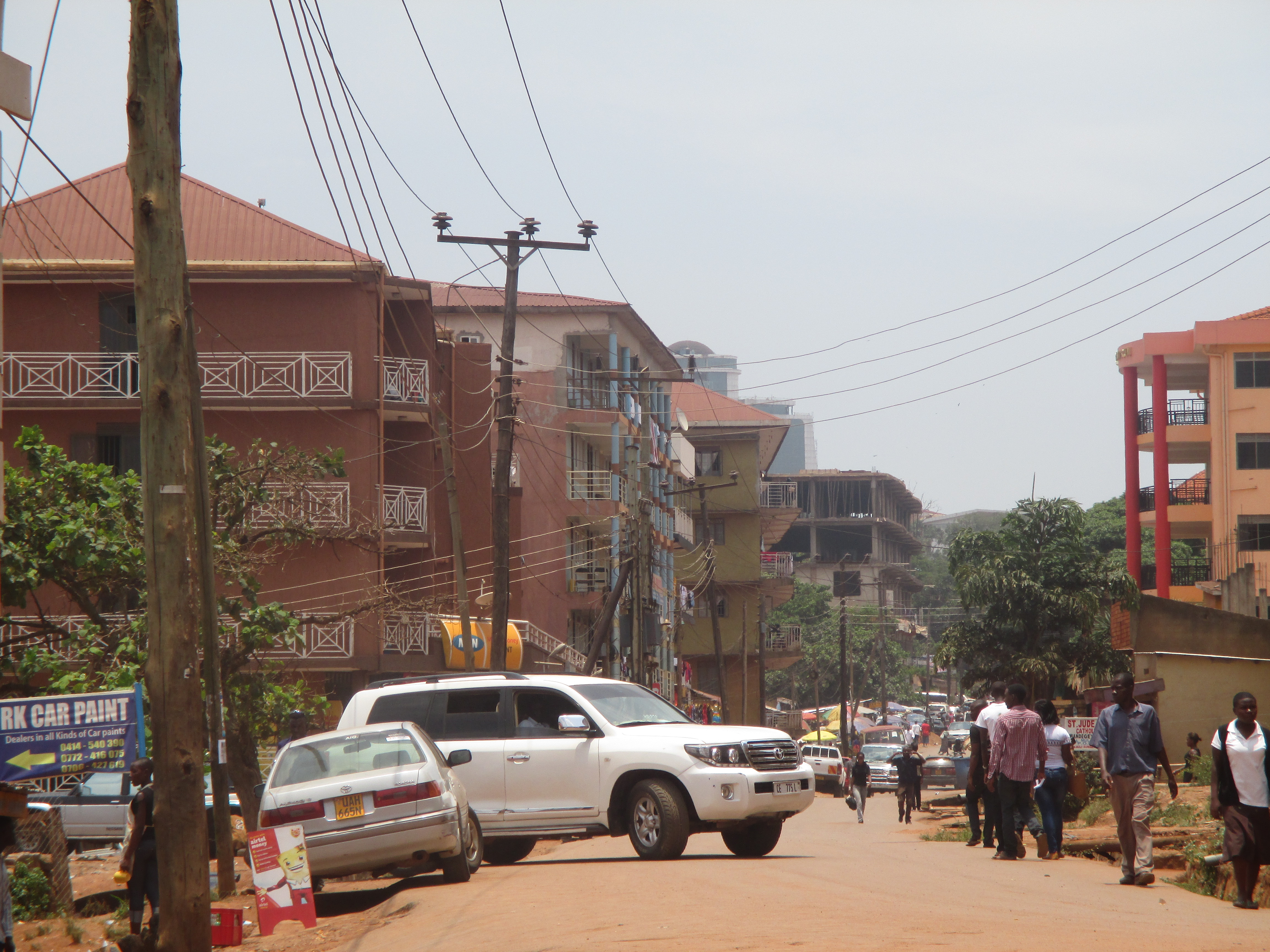
Students hostels in Katanga

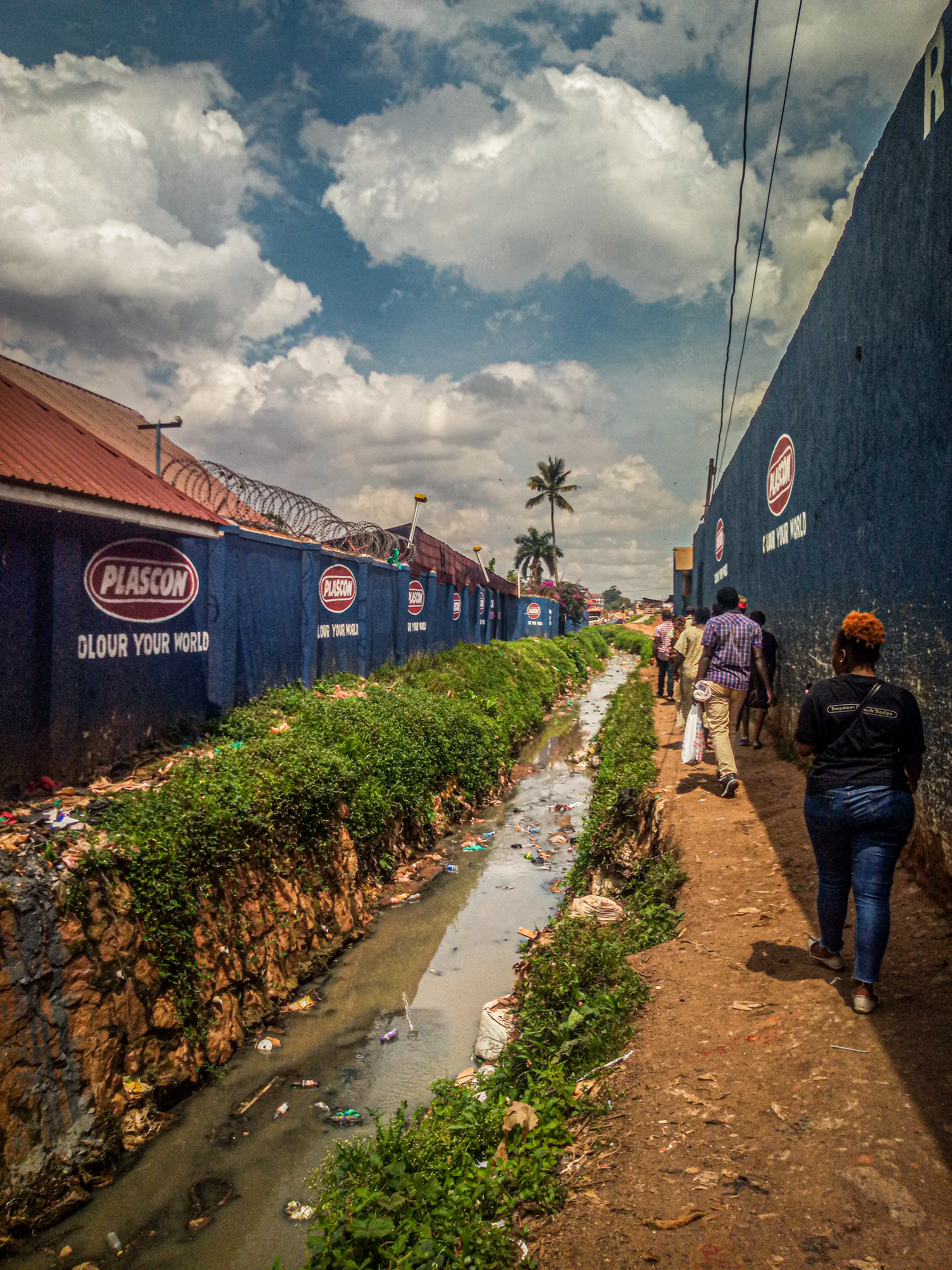
Access road with drainage channel

Malaria and public health activist Precious Baba organized a clean up exercise in both Busia and Kimwanyi zones of Katanga which occurred on the 27th and 28th of May respectively. She emphasized the need for cleanliness and malaria mitigation strategies. She donated mosquito nets, repellents and sanitary pads to the community. Many media houses were present including Bukedde TV, New Vision, Pml daily, The observer newspaper, Top tv, Salt tv and CBS FM Buganda.
