= Katalemwa =

- Location in Uganda
- Coordinates: 00°24′27″N 32°35′06″E
- Country: Uganda
- Region: Central Region
- District: Wakiso District
- County: Kyaddondo
- Constituency: Kyaddondo North
- Elevation: 3,900 ft (1,200 m)

Katalemwa is a neighborhood in Wakiso District in the Central Region of Uganda.

== Location ==
Katalemwa is on the Kampala–Gayaza Road, approximately 10 kilometres (6 mi), north of Kampala, the capital and largest city of Uganda.

Katalemwa is to the immediate north of Mpererwe, with Kasangati to the north, Wampeewo to the north-east, Kisaasi to the south-east, and Kawanda to the west. The coordinates of the township are 0° 24' 27.0"N, 32° 35' 6.0"N (Latitude:0.4075; Longitude:32.5850).

== Overview ==
In the 1900s, Makerere University maintained a residential estate in this neighborhood, for some of the university senior staff members. In 2020 the university plans to construct an upscale teaching hospital on the 30 acres (12 ha) that it owns in Katalemwa. The private 200-bed teaching hospital will serve as a teaching hospital for the Makerere University College of Health Sciences and as an internship hospital where new medical school graduates can serve the mandatory one year of supervised practice before attaining an unrestricted licence to practice.

One of the facilities in the neighborhood is the Katalemwa Cheshire Home, a facility catering to the needs of children with orthopedic, spinal, and mental developmental abnormalities and injuries. The Katalemwa Cheshire Home of Rehabilitation Services (KCH) is a registered non-governmental development organization in Uganda that was established in 1970. KCH is involved in the rehabilitation of children living with disabilities and the protection of their rights. KCH works with over 75 partner organizations in Uganda and neighboring countries.

== Points of interest ==
The following points of interest lie within Katalemwa or close to its borders:

- Katelemwa Housing Estate: The residential development belongs to Makerere University, and contains residences for some of the university's senior staff.
- Clays & Allied Industries Limited: A private factory that manufactures clay products.
- Makerere University Teaching Hospital: A planned 200-bed private hospital owned and operated by Makerere University.
