= Kyaliwajjala–Kira–Kasangati–Matugga Road =

Ugandan road

Coordinates: 00°26′49″N 32°34′50″E

Route information
- Length: 12.4 mi (20.0 km)

Major junctions
- South end: Kyaliwajjala
- Kira; Kasangati
- North end: Matugga

Location
- Country: Uganda

Highway system
- Roads in Uganda

The Kyaliwajjala–Kira–Kasangati–Matugga Road, also Kyaliwajjala–Matugga Road or Kira–Matugga Road, is a road in the Central Region of Uganda, connecting the neighborhood of Kyaliwajjala, in Kira Municipality in Wakiso District, to the town of Matugga, also in Wakiso District. This road is part of the 101 kilometres (63 mi) Kampala Outer Beltway Project.

== Location ==
The road starts at Kyaliwajjala, along the Kireka–Namugongo Road. It proceeds in a northwesterly direction to Downtown Kira. From there it continues northwestwards to Kasangati. At Kasangati, it crosses the Kampala–Gayaza Road and continues through Nangabo and Kiti, to end at Matugga, on the Kampala–Gulu Highway, approximately 20 kilometres (12 mi) from where it began.

== Overview ==
The road is a busy transport corridor in northern Kyaddondo County, linking rapidly expanding residential neighborhoods and business centers. Up until August 2020, most of the road was gravel-surfaced in varying stages of disrepair. That month, the Uganda National Roads Authority signed a construction contract with a Chinese contractor to upgrade the road to class II bitumen standard with shoulders, drainage channels, and culverts.

== Upgrade ==
The construction contract was awarded to Chongqing International Construction Corporation (CICO). Work includes widening the road to single carriageway standard. Five road junctions at Kyaliwajjala, Kira, Kasangati, Kiti and Matugga will be improved and/or equipped with traffic signals. Each side of the road will get a bicycle and pedestrian lane. Automated solar security lights are to be installed along the entire 20 kilometres (12 mi) of the road. In August 2024, it was reported that the 3 kilometres (2 mi) section between Kyaliwajjala and Kira would be converted to double carriageway (two lanes on each side).

== Funding and timeline ==
The construction contract is budgeted at approximately USh200 billion (approx. US$55 million). Work is expected to start during the fourth quarter of 2020 and last 36 months. Funding is 100 percent provided by the Government of Uganda.

== See also ==
- List of roads in Uganda
