= Makerere University Teaching Hospital =

Ugandan hospital

Geography
- Location: Katalemwa, Gayaza Road,, Wakiso District, Buganda Region, Uganda
- Coordinates: 00°23′04″N 32°34′44″E

Organisation
- Care system: Private
- Type: General & Teaching
- Affiliated university: Makerere University School of Medicine

Services
- Emergency department: 1
- Beds: 200

History
- Founded: 2023 (Expected)

Links
- Other links: Hospitals in Uganda; Medical education in Uganda

Makerere University Teaching Hospital, (MUTH), is a planned hospital, to be constructed in Katalemwa, Wakiso District, in the northern suburbs of Kampala, Uganda's capital and largest city.

== Location ==
The hospital would be located along the Kampala–Gayaza Road in the neighborhood called Katalemwa, in Wakiso District, in the northern suburbs of the capital city of Kampala, approximately 7 kilometres (4 mi), by road, north of Mulago National Referral Hospital. This is approximately 10 kilometres (6 mi), by road, north of Kampala's city center.

== Overview ==
As of December 2019, Makerere University, Uganda's oldest and largest public university, was in advanced stages of plannings to build a private teaching hospital in the northern suburbs of Kampala, the capital city of that East African country. The 200-bed hospital is to be hosted on 30 acres (12 ha) of land that the university owns in the Katalemwa neighborhood, in Wakiso District, off of the Kampala–Gayaza Road.

The development will include the hospital, student housing, staff housing, a day-care centre and green recreational spaces. The budgeted cost for the construction of the hospital is US$400 million. Construction is expected to start in 2020.

== Medical school affiliation ==
Makerere University Teaching Hospital is affiliated with Makerere University School of Medicine. It is expected to host interns, while they practice medicine under supervision for one year, before they attain an unrestricted licence to practice medicine.

== See also ==
- Hospitals in Uganda
