= Squatting in Uganda =

Illegal land occupation

Uganda in green on globe

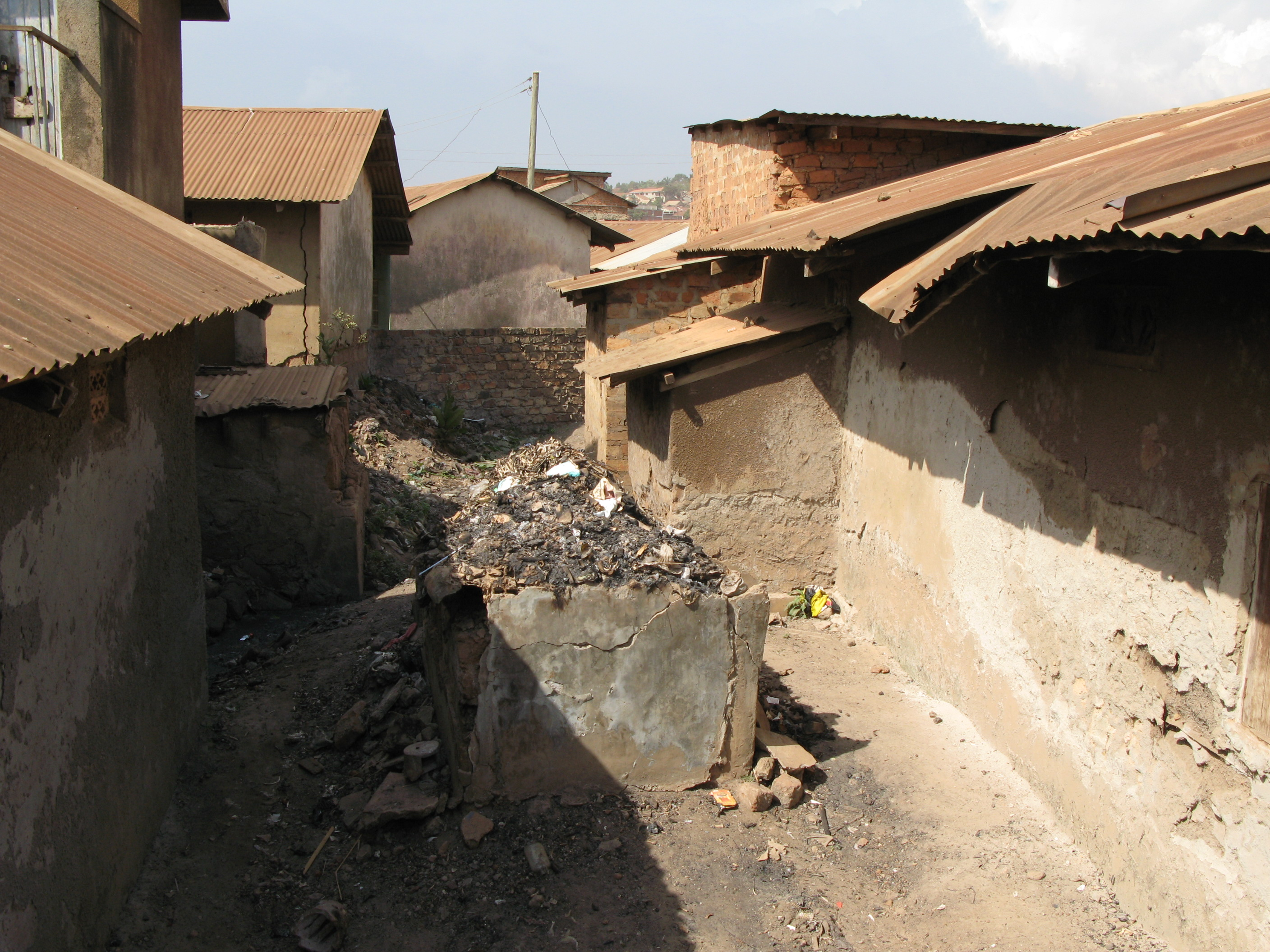
Informal settlement in Kampala

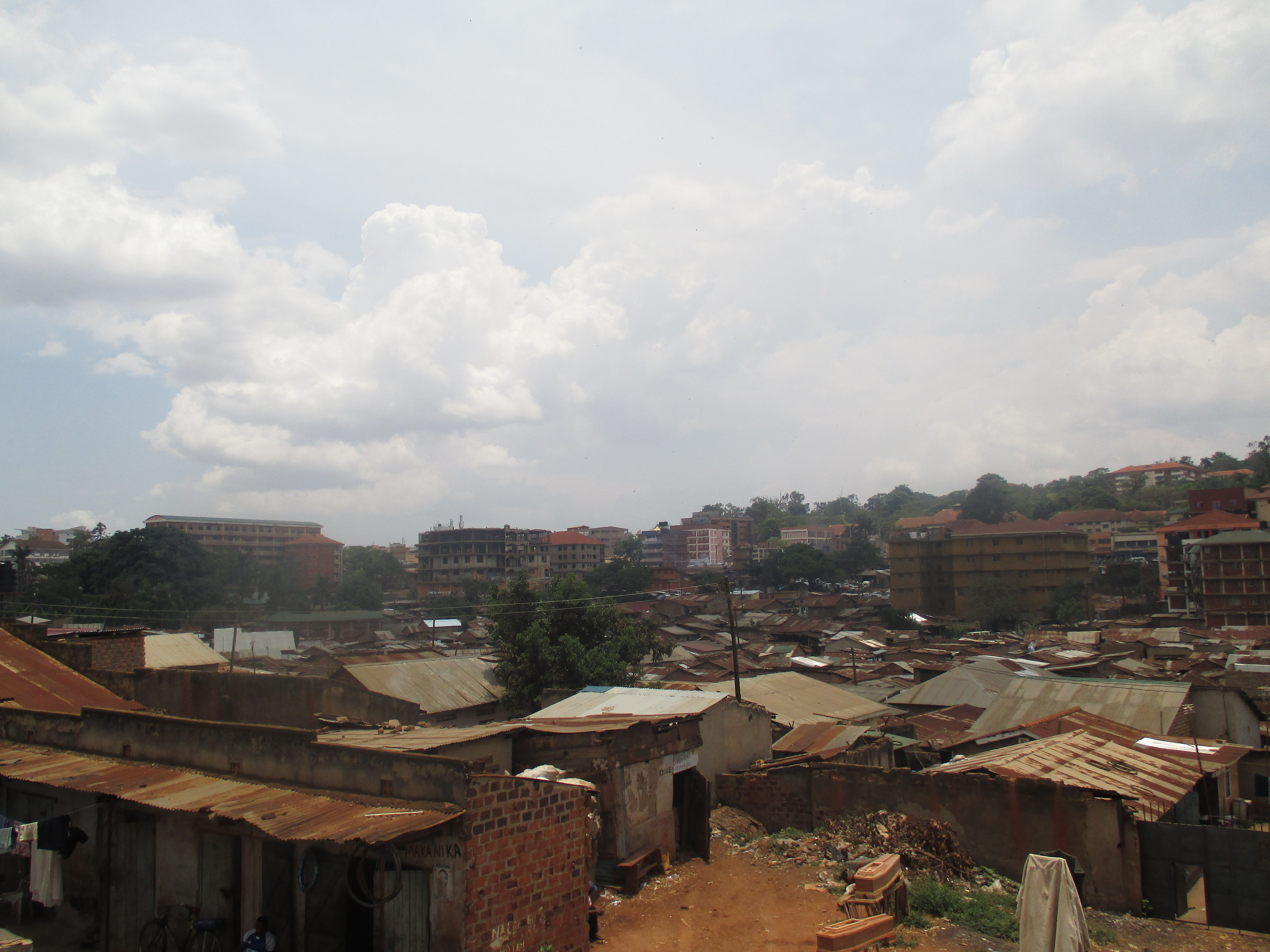
The Katanga slum

Squatting in Uganda is the occupation of derelict buildings or unused land without the permission of the owner. The complicated history of land tenure has generated conflicts between squatters and owners.

== Legality ==
In the Bugandan Kingdom (a Bantu kingdom within Uganda) as well as other areas, the 1900 Buganda Agreement assigned land to tribal leaders under the mailo system in which land is owned in perpetuity. The 1995 Constitution of Uganda mandated four forms of land ownership, namely mailo, customary, freehold and leasehold. Tenant rights were then boosted by the 1998 Land Act and its 2010 amendment. The government sought to regulate squatting amongst other things with the 2010 Land Amendment Act and the 2018 Landlord and Tenant Bill. People occupying publicly owned land are defined as squatters.

== History ==
The complicated history of land tenure has generated conflicts between squatters and owners. Pastoralists such as the Bahima were driven off their traditional lands when the government created ranches and nature reserves, thus forcing them to become squatters. This had generated a crisis by 1990.

In 2007, Makerere University in the capital Kampala began demolishing shacks in the Katanga slum. People fleeing violence in the Democratic Republic of Congo entered western Uganda in 2012 and when the refugee camps became full, they began squatting. A local administrator was killed when he went to check on the squatters. Violence broke out in 2014, when Bunyoro people evicted Congolese people squatting on their ancestral lands. President Yoweri Museveni asked land owners to stop evicting squatters in 2018. In 2019, a Wamala landlord was hacked to death. Mining companies from countries such as Spain and China have been buying up land in Karamoja for mining and thus the people living on the lands have become squatters.
