= Uganda National Records Centre and Archives =

- Location within Kampala

General information
- Type: Government Offices
- Location: 8-9 Lourdel Road, Wandegeya, Kampala, Uganda
- Coordinates: 00°19′56″N 32°34′42″E

Height
- Roof: Tile

Technical details
- Floor count: 4
- Lifts/elevators: 2

Design and construction
- Architect: China Railway Jianchang Engineering Company

The Uganda National Records Center and Archives (UNRCA), is a government building that houses the headquarters of the Uganda National Archives and Records Centre. Prior to the completion of this building, the national records were kept at the present day National Agricultural Research Organization (NARO) Secretariat, in the basement of a former colonial administration building in Entebbe.

== Location ==
The building is located at Plot 8-9 Lourdel Road in the Wandegeya neighborhood, in the Central Division of Kampala, Uganda's capital and largest city, about 2.5 kilometres (2 mi) north of the city's business district. The coordinates of the building are: 00°19'56.0"N, 32°34'42.0"E (Latitude:0.332222; Longitude:32.578333).

== Overview ==
The National Archives Center is administered by the Uganda Ministry of Public Service. Prospective researchers who intend to use the archives, require clearance from the National Council for Science and Technology. The clearance certificate costs US$300 for non-Ugandans and US$50 for Ugandan academics including postgraduate students pursuing Masters and Doctoral degrees. Undergraduates attending Ugandan universities are not charged a fee, but they require written clearance from their respective universities and from the National Council for Science and Technology.

== Construction ==
Construction of the building is progressing in phases. The construction of the first phase started in 2013 and was completed in 2015 at a cost of USh20.8 billion (US$5.8 million), using a USh20.3 billion (US$5.7 million) loan from the International Development Association (IDA) through the World Bank. The second phase is expected to cost USh28.6 billion (US$7.9 million). About USh5 billion (US$1.2 million) is needed to enable the center operate fully. The building is being developed in phases, due to insufficient funds. China Railway Jianchang Engineering Company was the main contractor for phase I, while Mutiso Menezes International were the supervising consultants.

== See also ==
- List of tallest buildings in Kampala
