= Evelyn Zalwango =

- Born: Uganda
- Education: Manipal Institute of Management
- Occupations: Businesswoman, Social entrepreneur
- Years active: 2007–present
- Employer: V Interiors Limited
- Organization(s): V Interiors Limited; American Chamber of Commerce Uganda
- Known for: Founder of V Interiors Limited; Fundi Women Initiative
- Notable work: Fundi Women Initiative
- Title: CEO, V Interiors Limited; General Manager, AmCham Uganda
- Children: 2
- Relatives: Kabaka Mutebi II (cousin)
- Awards: Women 4 Women Award (2018); Outstanding Community Social Impact Award (2023)

Evelyn Zalwango is a Ugandan businesswoman, social entrepreneur, and community development practitioner. She is the General Manager of the American Chamber of Commerce Uganda (AmCham Uganda) and the founder of V Interiors Limited and the Fundi Women Initiative.

== Early life and education ==
Evelyn Zalwango was born in Uganda to Sam Mulondo and Rachel Nakijoba. She is a member of the Buganda royal family and a first cousin to Kabaka Mutebi II. Despite her royal background, she has emphasized self-reliance and hard work from an early age.

Zalwango attended Hormisdallen Primary School and later studied at East High School, Ntinda, for both her O-Level and A-Level education. She pursued higher education at the Manipal Institute of Management in India, where she studied Information Technology.

In addition to her academic qualifications, she earned a diploma in carpentry and interior design. Her interest in carpentry was influenced by her grandfathers, who were skilled in landscaping and upholstery.

== Career ==
=== Early career ===
After returning to Uganda in 2007, Zalwango worked with Corporate Center, a German company providing virtual office services, before joining Go Lotto as a Public Affairs Manager. During this period, she also worked part-time at a furniture business(Awaka furniture) to refine her carpentry skills. In 2014, she declined an overseas job opportunity in Thailand to focus on building her career in carpentry and entrepreneurship.

=== Entrepreneurship ===
In 2016, she founded V Interiors Limited, starting from a small workshop in Kyebando, Kampala. The company later expanded to a larger facility in Namusera, Wakiso District. The business specializes in high-end furniture and interior design, serving corporate clients including hotels.

She is also the founder of the Fundi Women Initiative, a program aimed at empowering women to enter the construction and carpentry industries. The initiative focuses on marginalized and at-risk groups, including survivors of trafficking, early marriage, and teenage pregnancy.

=== Leadership and affiliations ===
Evelyn Zalwango is a Fellow of the U.S. Department of State’s Young African Leadership Initiative (YALI), having completed the program at the University of Notre Dame’s Mendoza College of Business in 2015. She later served as President of the Uganda YALI Fellows Chapter from 2016 to 2017.

She currently serves as the General Manager of the American Chamber of Commerce in Uganda (AmCham Uganda), where she oversees operations, member engagement, and inclusive business programs.

== Philanthropy and social impact ==
Evelyn Zalwango is involved in community development projects, particularly in western Uganda, where she works with landmine survivors. She has supported initiatives that enable individuals with limited mobility to earn a living, including projects involving the weaving of banana-fiber ropes. She has also launched environmental efforts, including a tree-planting initiative aimed at restoring forests and promoting sustainable use of wood resources in carpentry.

== See also ==
- Young African Leaders Initiative
