= Kampala–Gayaza Road =

Road in Uganda

Coordinates: 00°25′38″N 32°35′57″E

Route information
- Length: 9 mi (14 km)

Major junctions
- South end: Kampala
- Kaleerwe; Katalemwa; Mpererwe; Kasangati
- North end: Gayaza

Location
- Country: Uganda

Highway system
- Roads in Uganda

The Kampala–Gayaza Road is a road in the Central Region of Uganda, connecting the capital city of Kampala to the town of Gayaza in the Wakiso District. The road is part of the 44 kilometres (27 mi) Kampala–Gayaza–Ziroobwe Road Project.

== Location ==
The road starts at the roundabout on the Kampala-Bombo Road, 2 miles (3.2 km) from downtown Kampala. It continues through the Kaleerwe neighborhood, where it crosses the Kampala Northern Bypass Highway. It continues in a northeasterly direction through Kanyanya, Mpererwe, Luteete, Wampeewo, and Kasangati to end at Gayaza, about 14 kilometres (8.7 mi) from its beginning.

== Overview ==
The improvement to class II bitumen standard with shoulders, drainage channels, and culverts was commissioned in 2008.

== Points of interest ==
The following additional points of interest lie along or near the road:

- Kaleerwe, a neighborhood in the Kawempe Division of Kampala, about 7 kilometres (4 mi) from Kampala's central business district
- Kanyanya, a Kampala neighborhood, about 9 kilometres (6 mi) from Kampala
- Mpererwe, another neighborhood in Kampala, approximately 9.5 kilometres (6 mi) north of the city center
- Wampeewo, in Wampeewo Parish, Nangabo Subcounty, Wakiso District, approximately 15 kilometres (9 mi) north of Kampala City center
- Kasangati in Nangabo Subcounty, Wakiso District, about 16.5 kilometres (10 mi) north of Kampala
- Gayaza High School, an all-girls middle and high school in the town of Gayaza, about 1.2 kilometres (1 mi) north of the end of the Kampala–Gayaza Road

== See also ==
- List of roads in Uganda
