= Kampala Outer Beltway =

Road in Uganda

Coordinates: 00°27′49″N 32°33′17″E

Route information
- Length: 63 mi (101 km)
- History: Designated in 2017 (Expected); Expected completion in 2022

Major junctions
- East end: Seeta
- Namugongo; Kira; Kasangati; Matugga; Wakiso; Buloba; Nsangi; Kajjansi; Munyonyo
- South end: Ggaba

Location
- Country: Uganda

Highway system
- Roads in Uganda

The Kampala Outer Beltway, also known as the Kampala Outer Ring Road, is a planned road in Uganda. It will form a full circle around Kampala, Uganda's capital and largest city.

== Location ==
The planned road would start around Seeta in Mukono Town, approximately 16 kilometres (9.9 mi) east of Kampala, on the Kampala–Jinja Expressway. It would run north to Bukeerere in Mukono District, then turn west through Namugongo, Kira, Kasangati, Matugga, Wakiso, Buloba, to Nsangi on the Kampala–Mpigi Expressway. At Nsangi the beltway would link with the Kampala–Mpigi Expressway and to the Entebbe–Kampala Expressway and continue through Kajjansi to Munyonyo, on the northern shores of Lake Victoria. Traffic would then connect back the Kampala-Jinja Expressway via the Kampala Southern Bypass Highway. The estimated distance of the entire road is about 100 kilometres (62 mi).

== Overview ==
The objective of this road is to decongest Uganda's capital and largest city and to reduce the traffic jams on the roads and highways that run in and out of it. Advertising for qualified engineering firms to design the road, carry out feasibility studies, and perform an impact assessment were carried out in May 2014. The government of Uganda plans to develop and fund this road under a private-public partnership arrangement.

== Recent developments ==
As of January 2019, this road project was in the procurement stage, according to Allan Ssempebwa an official from UNRA. This will be followed by the tendering stage.

== See also ==
- List of roads in Uganda
