= Kyebando =

- Map of Kampala showing the location of Kyebando.
- Coordinates: 00°21′22″N 32°34′48″E
- Country: Uganda
- Region: Central Uganda
- District: Kampala Capital City Authority
- Division: Kawempe Division
- Elevation: 1,240 m (4,070 ft)
- Time zone: UTC+3 (EAT)

Kyebando is a neighborhood in Kampala, the capital and largest city in Uganda.

== Location ==
Kyebando is bordered by Kawempe to the northwest, Kikaaya to the northeast, Bukoto to the east, Mulago to the south, Bwaise to the southwest and Kaleerwe to the west. This location lies approximately 5.5 kilometres (3.4 mi), by road, northeast of Kampala's central business district.

== Overview ==
Kyebando is located on a hill that raises to 1,240 metres (4,070 ft) above sea-level. The base of the hill is a ring road, Kyebando Ring Road that makes a near-complete circle through the neighborhood. The hill and surrounding area is dotted with school, interspersed with low income residential houses. During the 2000s, numerous educational institutions have sprung up in the neighborhood. The rapid urbanization brings with it, strained public services and increased crime levels.

== See also ==
- Kampala District
- Northern Bypass
- Kampala
- Kawempe Division
- Central Uganda
