= Kaleerwe =

- Map of Kampala showing the location of Kyebando.
- Coordinates: 00°21′36″N 32°34′12″E
- Country: Uganda
- Region: Central Uganda
- District: Kampala Capital City Authority
- Division: Kawempe Division
- Time zone: UTC+3 (EAT)

Kaleerwe is a neighborhood within Kampala, Uganda's capital and largest city. Kaleerwe is a busy road-side marketplace, beyond which is a residential slum. Due to its relative low altitude, compared to the surrounding hills, and its proximity to a wetland, the area is prone to flooding. Kaleerwe merges with its immediate slum-neighborhood to the southwest, Bwaise. One may argue that Kaleerwe is part of Bwaise.

== Location ==
Kaleerwe is bordered by Kawempe to the north, Kyebando to the east, Makerere to the south, Bwaise to the southwest and Kazo to the west. It sandwiched between the Kampala-Masindi Highway to the west, the Kampala-Gayaza Highway to the east, the Kampala Northern Bypass Highway to the south. This location lies approximately 6 kilometres (3.7 mi), by road, north of Kampala's central business district. The coordinates of Kaleerwe are:0°21'07.0"N, 32°34'19.0"E (Latitude:0.351950; Longitude:32.571950).

== Points of interest ==
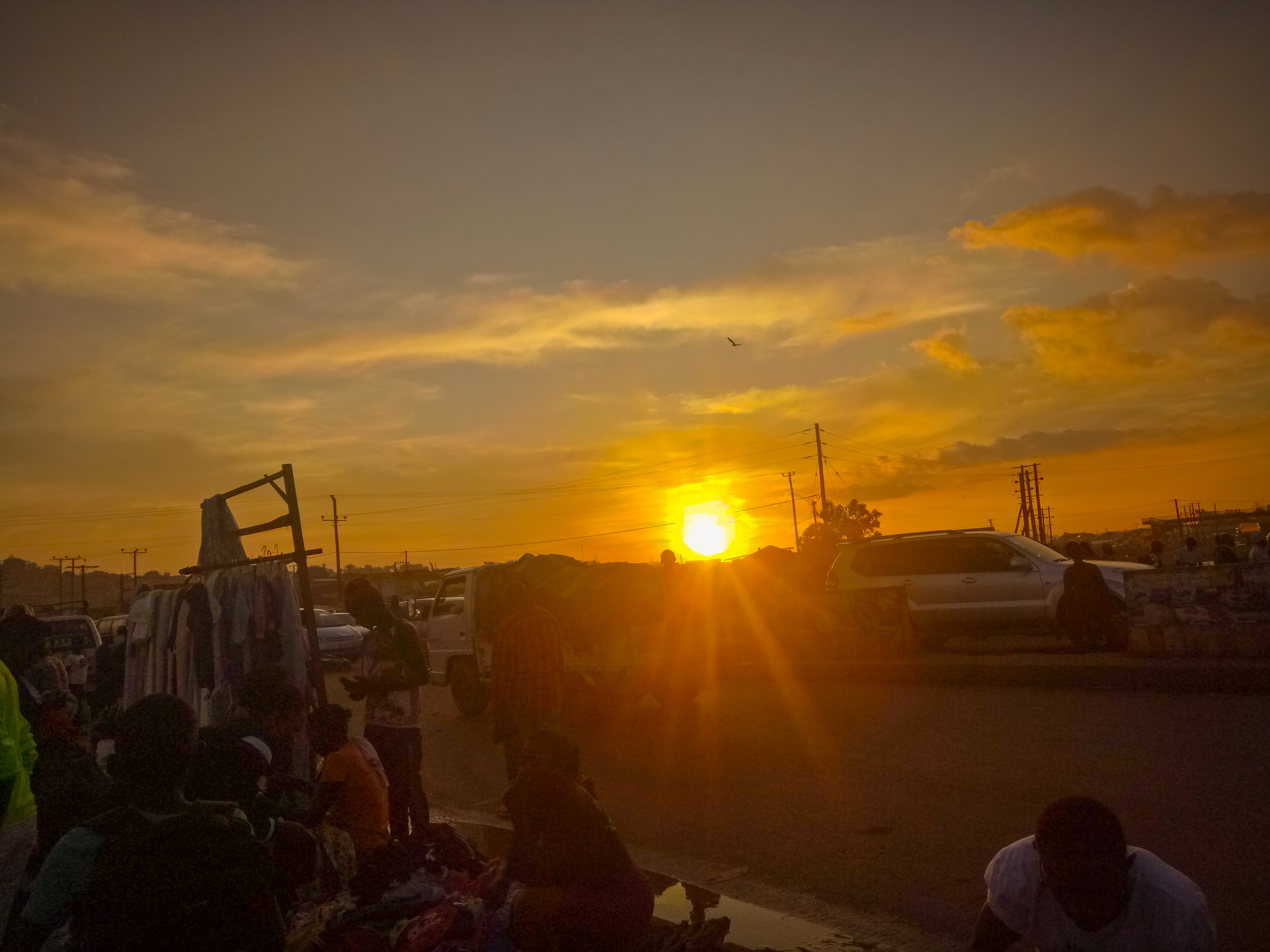
- The Kampala Northern Bypass Highway, passes through the neighborhood in a general east to west direction.
- The Kampala-Gayaza Highway passes through the neighborhood in a north to south direction.
- The Kaleerwe Central Market
- The Lubigi wetland has its origins in the streams and drainage channels in Kaleerwe.
- A branch of Equity Bank (Uganda)
- A branch of Finance Trust Bank
- Diamond Impex Supermarket - Located along Kampala-Gayaza Highway.

== See also ==
- KLA District
- Bypass Highway
- Gayaza
- Kawempe Division
- Central Uganda
