= Kanyanya =

- Map of Kampala showing the location of Bwaise.
- Coordinates: 00°22′25″N 32°34′38″E
- Country: Uganda
- Region: Central Uganda
- District: Kampala Capital City Authority
- Division: Kawempe Division
- Elevation: 1,200 m (3,900 ft)
- Time zone: UTC+3 (EAT)

Kanyanya is a neighborhood within the city of Kampala, Uganda's capital.

== Location ==
Kanyanya is bordered by Wakiso District to the north, Mpererwe to the east, Kaleerwe to the south, and Kawempe to the west. This is approximately 8 kilometres (5.0 mi), by road, north of Kampala's central business district.

== Overview ==
Kanyanya is predominantly a middle-class residential area. Small business establishments, such as petrol stations, restaurants and bars, appear at major intersections and along Kampala–Gayaza Road.

== See also ==
- Kampala Capital City Authority
- Kawempe Division
- Kampala District
- Central Region, Uganda
