= Mpererwe =

- Map of Kampala showing the location of Mpererwe.
- Coordinates: 00°22′55″N 32°34′31″E
- Country: Uganda
- Region: Central Region
- District: Kampala Capital City Authority
- Division: Kawempe Division
- Elevation: 1,200 m (3,900 ft)
- Time zone: UTC+3 (EAT)

Mpererwe is a neighborhood in the city of Kampala, Uganda's capital city. Sometimes it is spelled as Mpereerwe.

== Location ==
Mpererwe is in Kawempe Division in northern Kampala. It is bordered by Katalemwa in Wakiso District to the north, Kisaasi to the east, Kanyanya to the south, and Kawempe to the west. This location is approximately 10 kilometres (6.2 mi), by road, north of Kampala's central business district. The coordinates of Mpererwe are 0°22'55.0"N 32°34'31.0"E (Latitude:0.381950; Longitude:32.575275).

== Overview ==
Mpererwe is a trading centre that is gradually turning into a busy commercial area. Schools, gas stations, small-scale factories, hospitals, and a cinema hall are in this neighborhood. In up to 50 percent of homes, backyard urban agriculture is practiced. Because of the rapid urbanisation rate coupled with high unemployment, particularly among young people, the area is prone to crime. Despite those challenges, the neighborhood remains close-knit, with a modest cost of living compared to other areas of the city.

== Points of interest ==
These points of interest are located within Mpererwe or near its borders:

- Mpererwe Church of Uganda Primary School - A mixed, day, elementary school, affiliated with the Church of Uganda
- St. Stephen's Mpererwe Hospital - A private 100-bed community hospital affiliated with the Church of Uganda
- Katalemwa Cheshire Home - A rehabilitation center for children with severe orthopaedic, spinal and mental disabilities. Operated under contract by the Good Samaritan Sisters, under the supervision of the Roman Catholic Archdiocese of Kampala.
- Kiteezi Landfill, Kampala Capital City Authority Landfill; located at Kiteezi, near Mpererwe
- Faikha Senior Secondary School - A private, non-residential secondary school (S1-S4), affiliated with the Islamic Faith

== See also ==
- Kampala Capital City Authority
- Kampala District
- Central Region, Uganda
- Uganda National Roads Authority
- Kampala–Gayaza Road
