= Wampeewo =

- Location in Uganda
- Coordinates: 00°25′36″N 32°35′59″E
- Country: Uganda
- Region: Central Region of ganda
- District: Wakiso District
- Elevation: 3,870 ft (1,180 m)

Wampeewo is a neighborhood in Wakiso District, in the Central Region of Uganda.

== Location ==
Wampeewo is located immediately south of Kasangati on Kampala-Gayaza Road, approximately 15.5 kilometres (10 mi) north of Kampala, Uganda's capital and largest city. The coordinates of Wampeewo are 0°25'36.0"N, 32°35'59.0"E (Latitude:0.426681; Longitude:32.599737).

== Points of interest ==
- Kampala–Gayaza Road passes through the middle of Wampeewo
- Wampeewo Primary School
- Wampeewo Church of Uganda Primary School
- Wampeewo Day and Boarding Primary School
