= Bwaise =

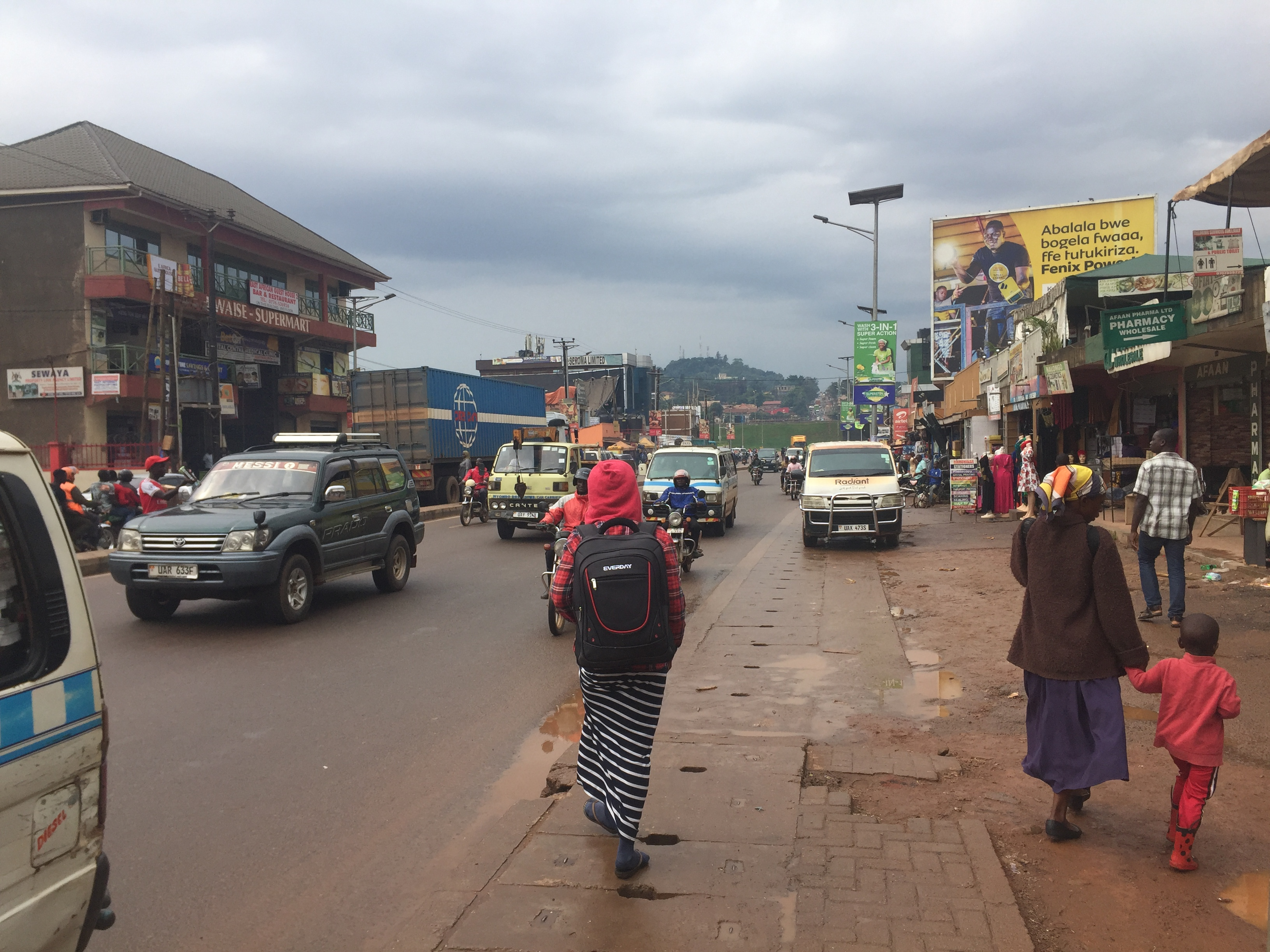
- Bombo Road

- Map of Kampala showing the location of Bwaise.
- Coordinates: 00°21′00″N 32°33′40″E
- Country: Uganda
- Region: Central Uganda
- District: Kampala Capital City Authority
- Division: Kawempe Division
- Elevation: 1,180 m (3,870 ft)
- Time zone: UTC+3 (EAT)

Bwaise is a neighborhood within Kampala, Uganda's capital, and largest city. Due to lack of proper urban planning, it has grown into a commercial, industrial and residential township with poor infrastructure. The lack of developed infrastructure and poor service provision has exposed the town dwellings and residents to several challenges including flooding and water borne diseases.

== Location ==
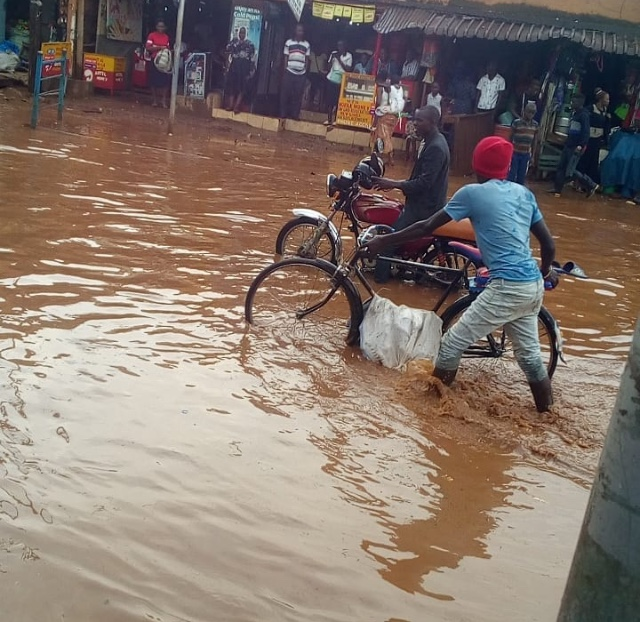
Flooded street in Bwaise

Bwaise is bordered by Kawempe to the north, Kyebando to the east, Mulago to the southeast, Makerere to the south and Kasubi to the southwest. This location lies approximately 5 kilometres (3.1 mi), by road, north of Kampala's central business district. The coordinates of Bwaise are:00 21 00N, 32 33 40E (Latitude:0.3500; Longitude:32.5610).

Bwaise is a slum, one of the poorest areas in the city of Kampala. The Uganda Scouts Association operates a school in Bwaise, called Outspan School Bwaise, with assistance from the Northamptonshire Scout Troupe in the United Kingdom. Other schools include Bilal Islamic school, Emmanuel College Kazo, Bwaise Parents primary school and Winston primary school among others.

Notable religious institutions include; St, Luke church of Uganda Kazo, Christian life church Bwaise, United Christian Church, St Kizito Catholic Church and Soul Winning and Deliverance Church.

Fast population growth has resulted in encroachment on the wetlands, the construction of unplanned buildings and poor drainage systems. These developments have made Bwaise prone to flooding.

== Points of interest ==
The following points of interest lie in or near Bwaise:

- The Kampala–Gulu Highway - The highway passes through the middle of the neighborhood in a North-South direction.
- Kawempe Division Headquarters
- The Lubigi wetland has its origins in the swamps in and around Bwaise.

== See also ==
- Kanyanya
- Kawempe
- Makerere
- Nansana
- Kawempe Division
