= Kasangati =

Town in Uganda

- Location in Uganda
- Coordinates: 00°26′16″N 32°36′09″E
- Country: Uganda
- Region: Central Region
- District: Wakiso District
- County: Kyaddondo
- Constituency: Kyaddondo East

Government
  - Mayor: Tom Muwonge
  - MP: Nkunyinji Muwada
- Elevation: 3,870 ft (1,180 m)

Population (2024 Census)
  - Total: 277,685

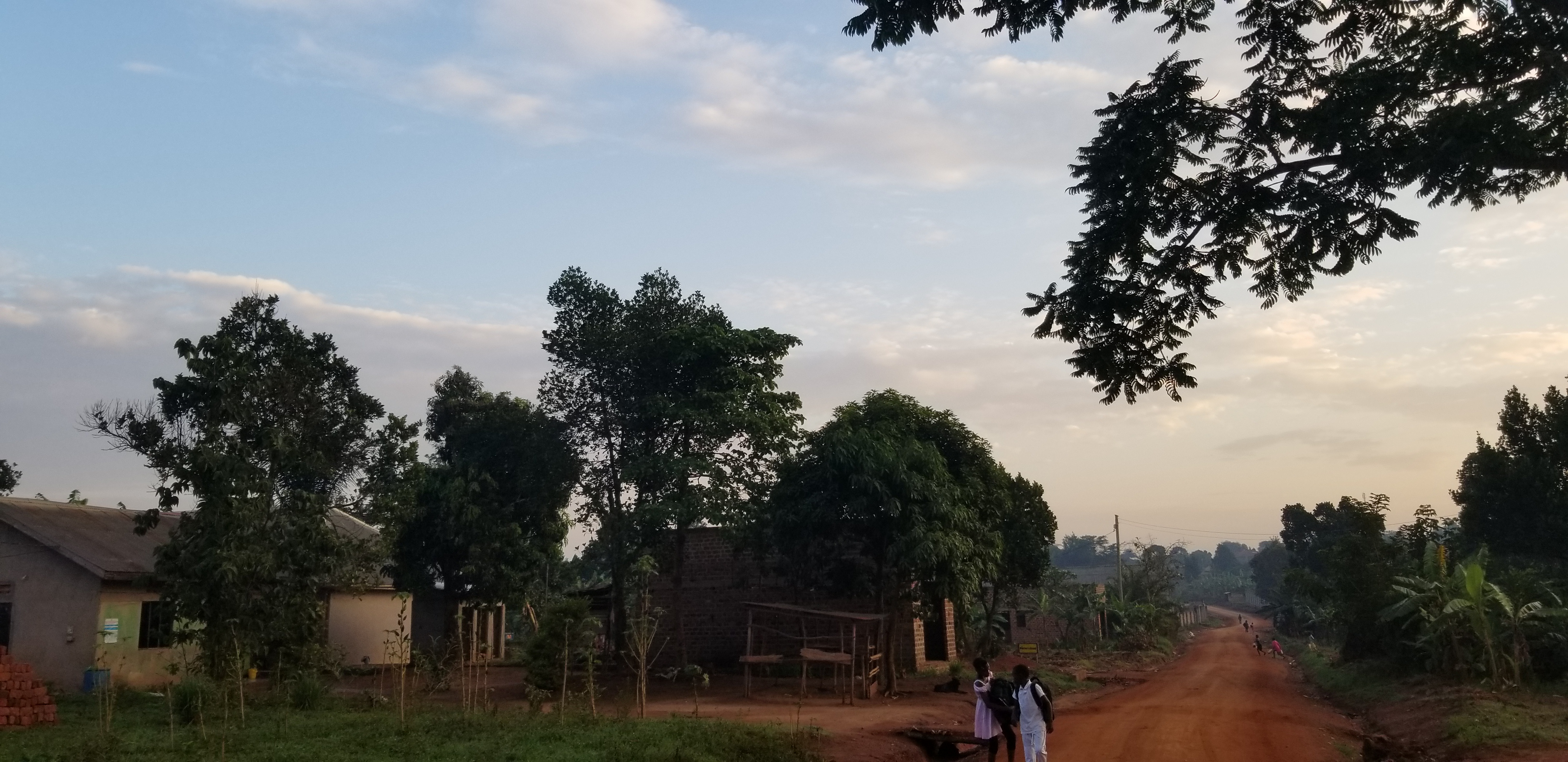
Bbamba Kasangati Area

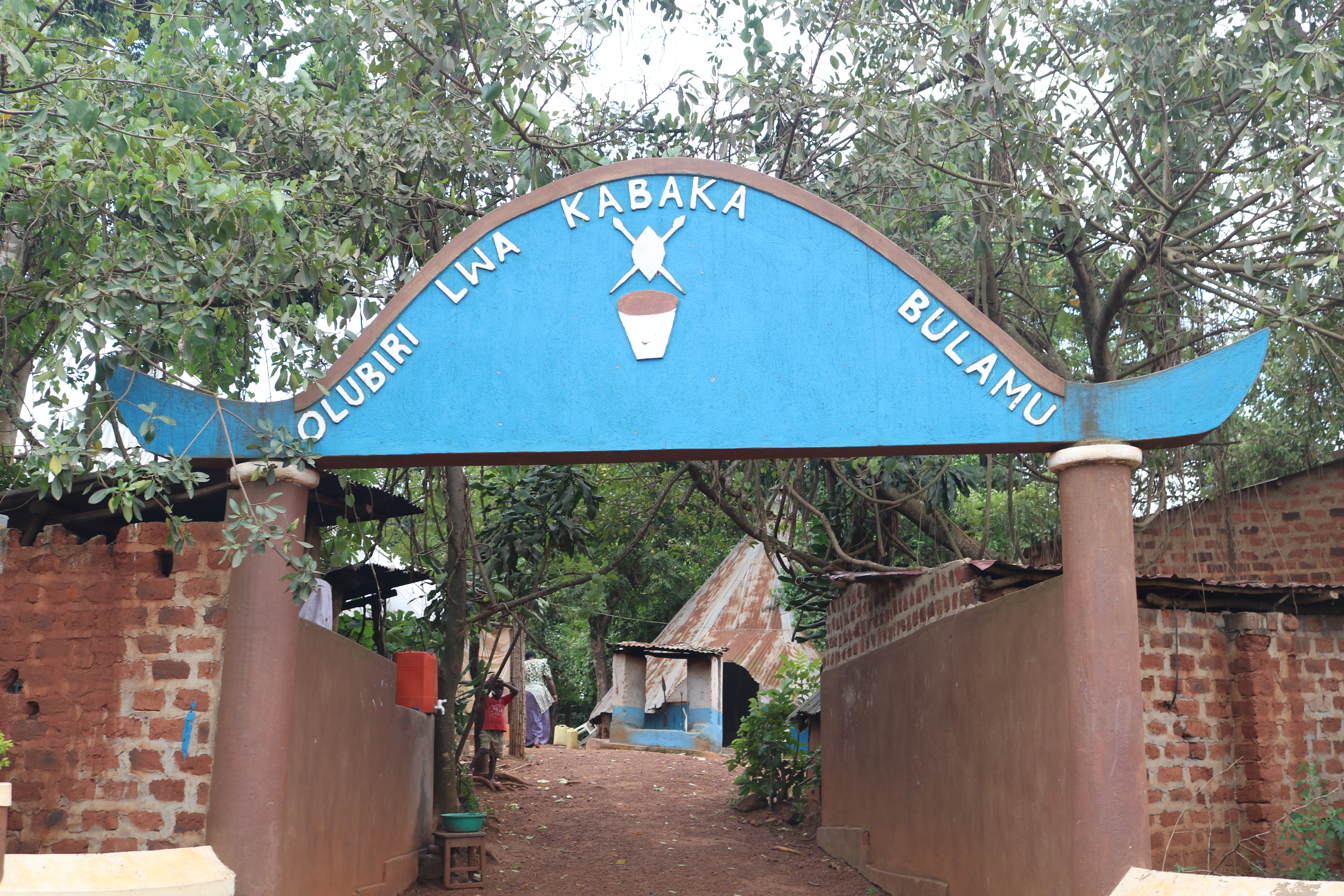
A shrine at Kasangati for Ndaula, Kiwanuka and Wanemas spirits.

Kasangati is a town in Nangabo sub-county, kyadondo East constituency Wakiso District in the Central Region of Uganda. It also serves as the headquarters for Kyadondo County. The town is multi-lingual and is a "melting pot" of diverse cultures.

== Locations ==
The town is located about 13 kilometres (8 mi) northeast of Kampala, Uganda's capital city, along the Kampala–Gayaza Road. In Kasangati, or near the town, there are several schools, including Gayaza High School, Our Lady Of Good Counsel, Kasangati High School, Kidde Primary School, Wampewo Ntakke School, and Nile College School. The town is also the location of the Afronica club. It is a "favourite hangout spot for many youth". As well as a landmark called Saza Ground." The coordinates of Kasangati are; 0°26'13.62"N, 32°36'9.87"E (Latitude: 0.437454; Longitude: 32.602706). The town lies at an average elevation of 1,178 metres (3,864 ft), above sea level.

== Population ==
The 2014 national population census, enumerated the population of Kasangati at 142,361 people.

The Uganda Bureau of Statistics (UBOS), estimated the population of Kasangati at 150,200 in 2015. In 2020, the UBOS estimated the mid-year population of the town at 207,800. The population agency calculated that the population of Kasangati Town Council grew at an average annual rate of 6.70 percent, between 2015 and 2020.

== Points of interest ==
The town has several additional points of interest, including:

1. The offices of Kasangati Town Council

2. Kasangati Health Center IV

3. Nile College Kasangati

4. Kasangati Central Market

5. The Kampala–Gayaza Road intersects with the Kyaliwajjala–Kira–Kasangati–Matugga Road, in the middle of Kasangati.

6. Retired physician, military officer and politician, four-time presidential candidate, Colonel Kiiza Besigye, maintains a home and cattle ranch on the northwestern end of Kasangati, off of the Kasangati-Matugga Road.

== See also ==
- Kira Town
- Wampeewo
