= Kawempe =

- Map of Kampala showing the location of Kawempe.
- Coordinates: 00°22′45″N 32°33′27″E
- Country: Uganda
- Region: Central Uganda
- District: Kampala Capital City Authority
- Division: Kawempe Division
- Time zone: UTC+3 (EAT)

Kawempe is an area in the city of Kampala, Uganda's capital. It is also the location of the headquarters of Kawempe Division, one of the five administrative divisions of Kampala.

== Location ==
Kawempe is located on the northwestern edge of Kampala. It is bordered by Nabweru to the north, Kisaasi to the east, Bwaise to the south, Kazo to the southwest and Nansana in Wakiso District to the west. The road distance between Kampala's central business district and Kawempe is approximately 8.5 kilometres (5.3 mi). The coordinates of Kawempe are: 0°22'45.0"N 32°33'27.0"E (Latitude:0.3792; Longitude:32.5574).

== Overview ==
Kawempe lies on the main highway between Kampala and Masindi. It began as a trading center in the 1950s but has mushroomed into a busy, albeit disorganized, metropolitan area with businesses, small industries, retail shops and a thriving farmers market. Many of the surrounding villages have been turned into low-income housing.

== Points of interest ==
Kawempe hosts the following points of interests:

- Headquarters of Kawempe Division
- Headquarters of the Juma and Zukuli Muslim groups, one of the traditional Muslim sects in Uganda Islamic history.
- Kawempe National Referral Hospital - A public hospital under the administration of the Uganda Ministry of Health.
- Mulago Referral Hospital
- Mulago Specialized Women and Neonatal Hospital (MSWNH)

== Notable Natives ==
- Joshua Baraka (born 2001), musician
- Pinky (born 2004), musician
- Nalukoola Luyimbazi
- Jose Chameleone

== See also ==
- Bwaise
- Kaleerwe
- Kanyanya
- Mpererwe
- Kawempe Division
