= Wandegeya =

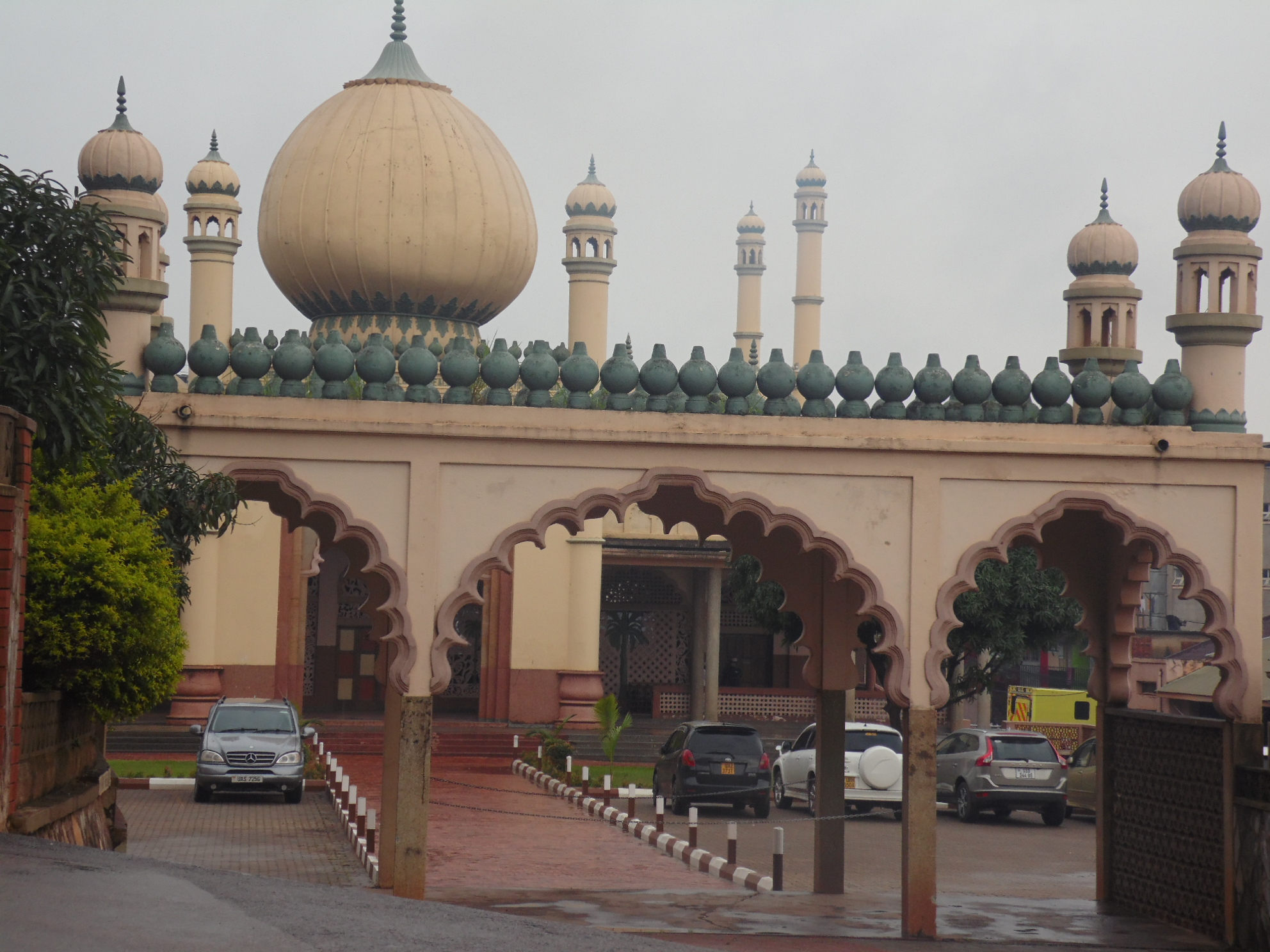
- Wandegeya Mosque

- Map of Kampala showing the location of Wandegeya.
- Coordinates: 00°19′52″N 32°34′25″E
- Country: Uganda
- Region: Central Uganda
- District: Kampala Capital City Authority
- Division: Kampala Central Division
- Elevation: 1,200 m (3,900 ft)
- Time zone: UTC+3 (EAT)

Wandegeya is a neighborhood within the city of Kampala, Uganda's capital and largest metropolitan area. The name is derived from the weaver birds, (Endegeya in Luganda), which used to inhabit the area prior to the 1990s.

== Location ==
Wandegeya lies in Kawempe Division, one of the five administrative divisions of Kampala. It is bordered by the Bombo Road/Gayaza Road Roundabout to the north, Mulago Hill to the northeast, Kamwookya to the east, Nakasero Hill to the south east and to the south, and the main campus of Makerere University to the west and northwest. This is approximately 2.5 kilometres (1.6 mi), by road, north of Kampala's central business district. The coordinates of Wandegeya are 0°19'52.0"N, 32°34'25.0"E (Latitude:0.331112; Longitude:32.573600).

== Overview ==
Wandegeya can be divided into three main sections:

(a) Area A

- The area east of Bombo Road, but south of Haji Musa Kasule Road. This is part of Nakasero Hill, Kampala's most upscale residential and commercial address. This area contains the government ministries, the diplomatic missions and the police station.

(b) Area B

- The area bounded by Bombo Road to the east, Makerere Hill Road to the south and Jjunju Road to the west and north. This is predominantly a commercial area. It houses the newly constructed Wandegeya Market, numerous shops along Bombo Road and along Makerere Hill Road, as well as a number of restaurants with local and International cuisines, Hotloaf, ATMs, Internet Cafe. However, there are several high-rise apartment buildings and some lower class rental units in this section. The Wandegeya Mosque is also located in this area.

(c) Area C

- The area bounded by Haji Musa Kasule Road to the south, Bombo Road to the west and Yusuf Lule Road to the east. Prior to the 1990s this area was largely a slum. As the number of students admitted to Makerere University increased, investors began to tear down the slum housing and erected high-rise student hostels in the area. Today, respectable businesses such as the Wandegeya Post Office, several commercial banks and an office of the Salvation Army, have relocated into the area.

== Points of interest ==
The following points of interest are located in or near Wandegeya:

- The offices and facilities of the Kampala YMCA
- Wandegeya Post Office
- Wandegeya Police Station - A station of the Uganda National Police
- ABII Clinic
- Wandegeya Farmers Market
- Wandegeya Mosque - A place of worship affiliated with the Islamic faith
- The headquarters of the Uganda Ministry of Public Service
- The offices of the Uganda National Council for Science and Technology
- The Mission of the Food and Agriculture Organization in Uganda
- The Uganda Ministry of Health Headquarters
- The offices of the Uganda Government Analytical Chemist
- Sure Travel International Office
- Africell Outlet on Makerere Hill Road before Total Petroleum Station.

== See also ==
- Kampala Capital City Authority
- Makerere
- Nakasero
- Mulago
- Kawempe Division
