= Kawempe Division =

Administrative division of Kampala, Uganda

Coordinates: 00°23′N 32°33′E

Kawempe
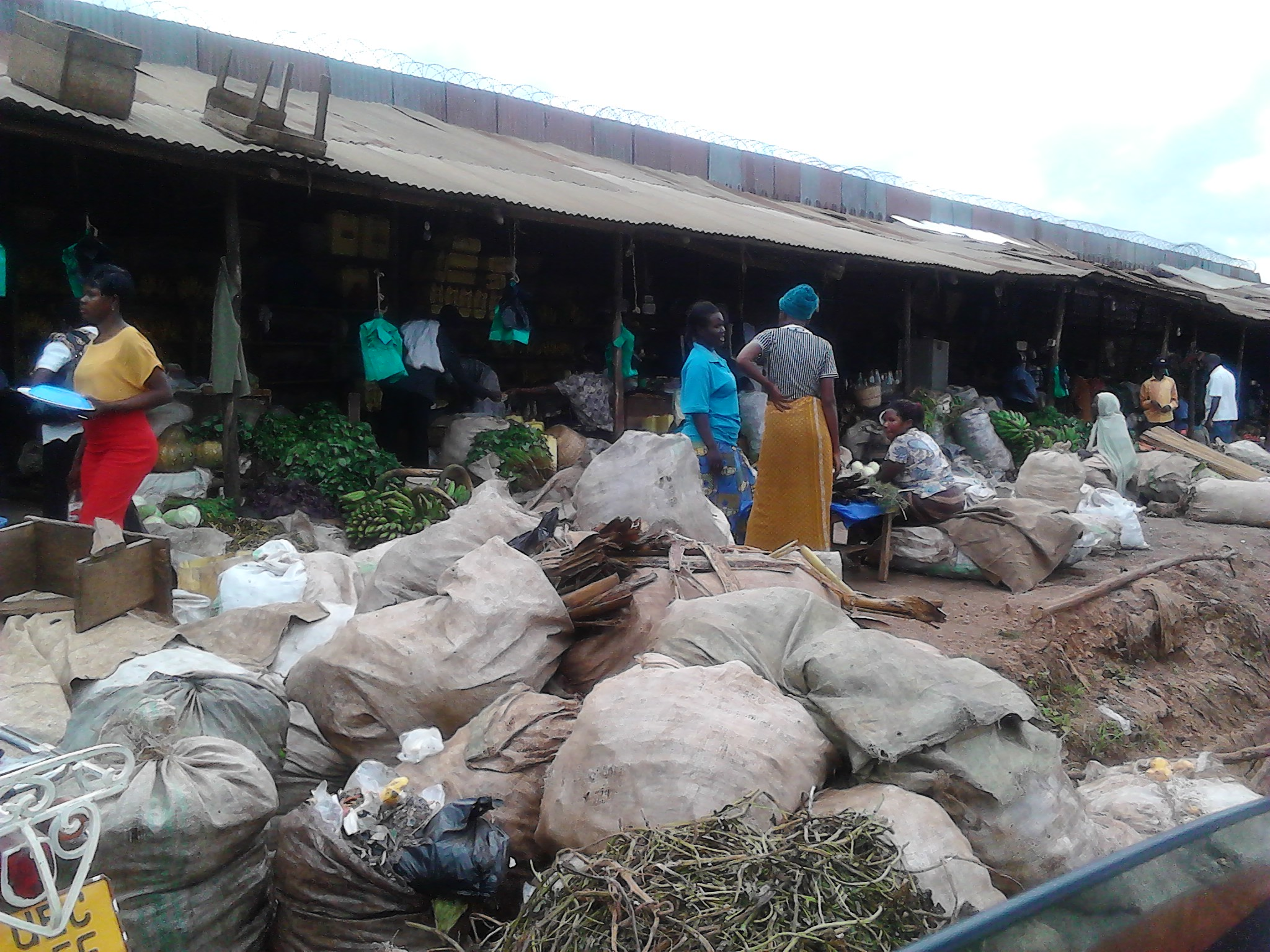
- Kawempe Market
- Interactive map of Kawempe

Kawempe Division is one of the five divisions that comprise the city of Kampala along with Makindye Division, Rubaga Division, Nakawa Division and Central Division, It has 19 parishes and 771 villages. The parishes include Bwaise I, Kanyanya, Kazo ward, Kyebando, Makerere iii, Mulago I, Bwaise ii, Kawempe I, Kikaya, Makerere I, Mpererwe, Mulago iii, Bwaise III, Kawempe ii, Komambogo, Makerere ii, Mulago i, and Makerere University. The division's current mayor is Dr. Emmanuel Serunjogi.

== Location ==
Kawempe Division is located in the northern part of Kampala. It is one of the five divisions that make up Kampala city bordering Wakiso District to the west, north and east, Nakawa Division to the southeast, Kampala Central Division to the south, and Lubaga Division to the southwest. The coordinates of the division are 00 23N, 32 33E (Latitude:0.3792; Longitude:32.5574).

The neighborhoods in Kawempe Division include Kawempe, Kanyanya, Kazo, Mpererwe, Kisaasi, Kikaya, Kyebando, Bwaise, Komamboga, Mulago, Makerere, and Wandegeya.

== Overview ==
Kawempe Division is the largest division in Kampala, with an estimated population of 388,665. Kawempe Division has a high mortality and morbidity burden compared to the other four divisions in the city. A survey in 2013 ranked it highest in HIV/AIDS transmission out of the five divisions within Kampala. Crime is also a concern.

== See also ==
- Kawempe
- Kampala Capital City Authority
- Kampala Central Division
- Nakawa Division
- Makindye Division
- Rubaga Division
