= Medical school in Uganda =

As of 2021, 11 universities in Uganda offer medical schools. Admission to medical school requires the candidate to have attained a Uganda Advanced Certificate of Education (UACE) as well as proficiency in Biology or Zoology, Chemistry and Physics at A-level standards. Training leading to the degree of Bachelor of Medicine and Bachelor of Surgery (MBChB) lasts five years. Major examinations are conducted after the first, second and fifth year, with additional evaluations after each clinical rotation. After successful completion of the fifth year, candidates complete a year of internship under the supervision of specialists. Postgraduate training is available at Makerere University School of Medicine and other Public and Private Universities in a number of medical and surgical disciplines. The training takes three to four years and leads to the Master of Medicine (MMed) degree. The East, Central and Southern Africa College of Health Sciences (ECSA CHS) is nowadays another alternative postgraduate training pathway in Uganda, such as Membership [MCS (ECSA)] and Fellowship [FCS (ECSA)] of the College of Surgeons of East, Central and Southern Africa (COSECSA); as well as in Internal Medicine through the East, Central and Southern Africa College of Physicians (ECSACOP) and the College of Obstetrics and Gynecology of East, Central and Southern Africa (ECSACOG) for Obstetricians and Gynecologists.

== Medical schools ==
As of October 2018 there are eleven recognized medical schools in Uganda.

=== Public universities ===
- Makerere University College of Health Sciences: Mulago, Kampala: Founded in 1924
- Mbarara University School of Medicine: Mbarara: Founded in 1989
- Busitema University School of Medicine: Mbale: Founded in 2013
- Gulu University School of Medicine - Gulu - Founded in 2004
- Kabale University School of Medicine: Kabale: Founded in 2015
- Soroti University School of Medicine: Soroti: Founded in 2019 (Expected).

=== Private universities ===
- Kampala International University School of Health Sciences: Ishaka, Bushenyi: Founded in 2004
- Habib Medical School - Kibuli, Kampala - Founded in 2014
- St. Augustine International University College of Health, Medical & Life Sciences: Mulago, Kampala: Founded in 2012
- Clarke International University School of Medicine: Namuwongo, Kampala: Founded In 2008
- Uganda Martyrs University School of Medicine: Nsambya, Kampala: Founded in 2010
- Uganda Christian University School of Medicine: Mengo, Kampala: Founded in 2018.

== Admission ==
Admission to medical school in Uganda requires the candidate to have attained the pre-requisite minimum score on the A-level national examinations leading to the award of the Uganda Advanced Certificate of Education or UACE, administered by the Uganda National Examinations Board (UNEB). Proficiency in Biology or Zoology, Chemistry and Physics at A-level standards are requirements for entry into Ugandan medical schools.

== Medical training ==
Training leading to the award of the degree of Bachelor of Medicine and Bachelor of Surgery (MBChB) lasts five (5) years, if there are no re-takes.

- The first year is spent on the Basic Sciences i.e. Anatomy, Physiology and Biochemistry.
- The second year is devoted to Histology, Pathology, Microbiology, Pharmacology, Psychology and Introductory Psychiatry.
- The third year is spent rotating through the four major clinical disciplines of Internal Medicine, Surgery, Pediatrics and Obstetrics and Gynecology.
- The fourth year is devoted to Public Health (including community health projects) and the surgical specialties of Otolaryngology, Orthopedics, Urology, Neurosurgery and Ophthalmology. Clinical Psychiatry, Infectious Diseases and Tropical Medicine are also covered.
- The fifth year is spent rotating through the four major clinical disciplines, similar to the third year.

== Examinations ==
There is a major examination after the first year. If the candidate does not pass, the candidate will repeat first year. Another major examination is given after second year. A failing candidate will have to repeat second year. After each clinical rotation, the candidate is examined and failing candidates are required to repeat that rotation during the next vacation period.

The last major examination is the final 5th Year MBChB examination. This is divided into three parts:

- A written Examination in each of the following disciplines: Internal Medicine, Surgery, Pediatrics and Obstetrics and Gynecology
- A bedside clinical examination with living patients, involving a "long case" and a series of "short cases" in each of the four specialties.
- An oral examination (also called a "viva"), before two clinical examiners, in each of the four subjects.

The final year clinical examinations in each of the four clinical disciplines are attended by an "External Examiner", often a professor of International or Regional repute, from a foreign medical school. The examiners arrange it so that the excelling students and those who are on the verge of failing are seen by the External Examiner in at least one of the clinical face-to-face encounters. So if you are a candidate and you go before the "External Examiner", it usually means that you are either excelling in your field or you are on the verge of failing that subject.

== Internship ==
After successfully passing the final 5th year examinations, one is awarded the degree of Bachelor of Medicine and Bachelor of Surgery (MBChB). A year of internship in a hospital designated for that purpose, under the supervision of a specialist in that discipline is required before an unrestricted license to practice medicine and surgery is granted by the Uganda Medical and Dental Practitioners Council. Six months of the internship must be spent in a medical discipline (either Internal Medicine or Pediatrics) and another six months in a surgical discipline (either Surgery or Obstetrics and Gynecology).

== Internship hospitals ==
The following hospitals are designated "Internship Hospitals" in Uganda, provided there is a specialist in the required field willing to supervise the intern at the particular hospital:

- Mulago National Referral Hospital
- Arua Regional Referral Hospital
- Fort Portal Regional Referral Hospital
- Gulu Regional Referral Hospital
- Hoima Regional Referral Hospital
- Jinja Regional Referral Hospital
- Kabale Regional Referral Hospital
- Lira Regional Referral Hospital
- Masaka Regional Referral Hospital
- Mbale Regional Referral Hospital
- Mbarara National Referral Hospital
- Mengo Hospital
- Moroto Regional Referral Hospital
- Mubende Regional Referral Hospital
- St. Francis Hospital Nsambya
- Soroti Regional Referral Hospital
- Lubaga Hospital (Formerly Rubaga Hospital)
- St. Mary's Hospital Lacor

== Postgraduate training ==
Specialization training, lasting three years, (provided there are no re-takes), leading to the award of the degree of Master of Medicine (MMed) in the particular discipline is available at Makerere University School of Medicine in the following disciplines: (both medical and surgical disciplines award the MMed)

- Anesthesiology
- Family Medicine
- Hematology
- Internal Medicine
- Medical Oncology
- Microbiology
- Neurosurgery
- Obstetrics and Gynecology
- Ophthalmology
- Otolaryngology
- Pathology
- Pediatrics
- Psychiatry
- Surgery
- Surgical Oncology
- Urology

Makerere University School of Public Health, located on Mulago Hill, offers the degree of Master of Public Health (MPH) following a 22-month period of study which includes field work.

The degree of Doctor of Philosophy (PhD) is awarded following a period of instruction, research and examination (typically three to five years), in select clinical disciplines. A recognized master's degree is required prior to admission into the PhD program.

== See also ==
- List of medical schools in Uganda
