= Moroto Hospital =

Public hospital in Uganda

Moroto Regional Referral Hospital
- Uganda Ministry of Health
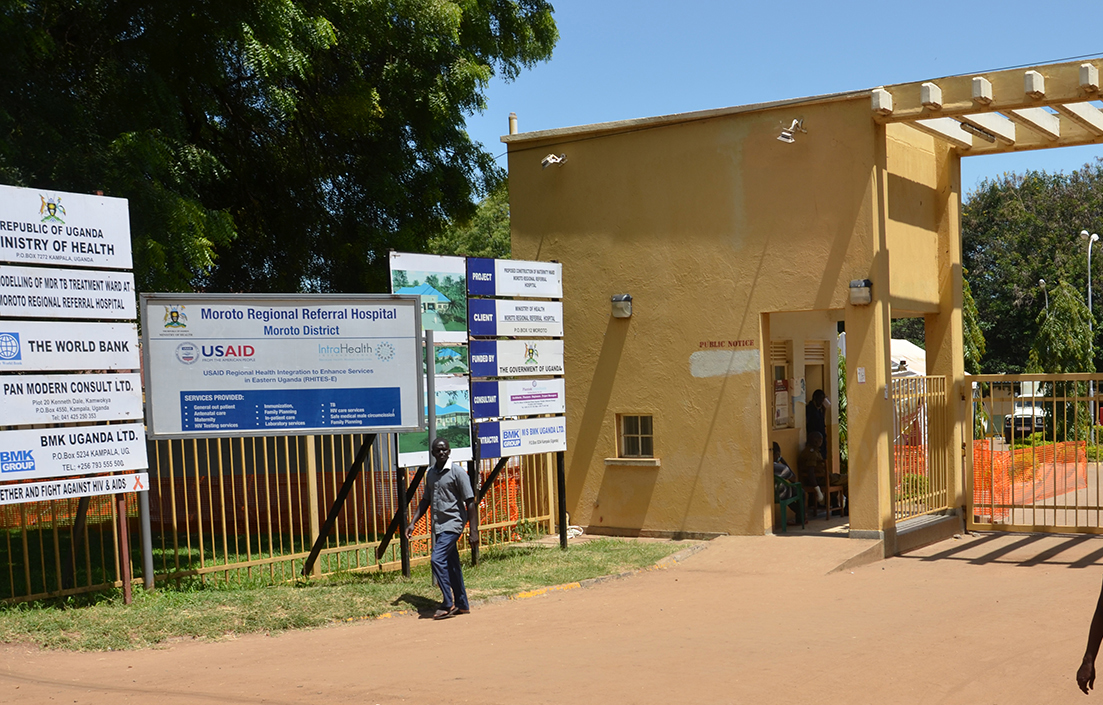

Geography
- Location: Moroto, Moroto District, Uganda
- Coordinates: 02°31′53″N 34°39′25″E

Organisation
- Care system: Public
- Type: General and Teaching

Services
- Emergency department: I
- Beds: 114

History
- Founded: 1940

Links
- Other links: Hospitals in Uganda; Medical education in Uganda

Moroto Regional Referral Hospital, commonly known as Moroto Hospital is a hospital in the town of Moroto, in Northeastern Uganda. It is the referral hospital for the districts of Abim, Kaabong, Kotido, Moroto and Nakapiripirit and Napak.

== Location ==
The hospital is located in the central business district of Moroto City, in Moroto District, approximately 272 kilometres (169 mi), by road, north of Mbale Regional Referral Hospital, in the city of Mbale. This is approximately 170 kilometres (106 mi) northeast of Soroti Regional Referral Hospital, in the city of Soroti.

Moroto Regional Referral Hospital is located approximately 462 kilometres (287 mi), by road, north-east of Mulago National Referral Hospital, in Kampala, Uganda's capital city. The coordinates of Moroto Hospital are: 02°31'53.0"N, 34°39'25.0"E (Latitude:2.531389, Longitude: 34.656944).

== Overview ==
Moroto Hospital is a public hospital funded by the Uganda Ministry of Health. General care in the hospital is free. It is one of the thirteen regional referral hospitals in Uganda. The hospital is one of the fifteen internship hospitals where graduates of Ugandan medical schools can serve one year of internship under the supervision of qualified specialists and consultants. The bed capacity of Moroto Hospital was 114 beds as of June 2010.

== Renovation ==
In 2015, the government of Uganda, using $52.6 million borrowed from the World Bank, rehabilitated and renovated seven hospitals, including Moroto Hospital. Moroto Regional Referral Hospital received (a) power houses, (b) a new out-patient department, (c) ventilated improved pit (VIP) latrines and (d) 15 new staff houses.

A new 144,000 litres (31,676 imp gal; 38,041 US gal) water-supply reservoir was constructed, supplemented with solar-powered boreholes, as water sources. A new sewage system for the hospital was also installed.

== See also ==
- List of hospitals in Uganda
- Karamoja
- Karamojong language
