= Mbale Secondary School =

Government secondary school in Uganda

Coordinates: 1.08°N 34.17°E

- Mbale, Mbale District; Uganda

Information
- Type: Public middle school and high school
- Motto: Triumph Beyond The Stars
- Established: 1949
- Athletics: Football, basketball, cricket, athletics, rugby, volleyball, lawn tennis, table tennis, field hockey

Mbale Secondary School, founded in 1949 by the British colonial government with the sole purpose of serving the Asian community, is a government-funded secondary school located in Mbale District, Uganda. It is one of the most populated schools with a population ranging between (8,000 - 20,000 students). Located in Eastern Region, Uganda, the school was initially located at present day North Road Primary School before switching to its current location in 1954, it offers both science and arts education, including information technology.

== Historically notable alumni ==
- Nandala Mafabi - Ugandan Lawyer and Politician.
- George Kirya - Ugandan Academician and Micro Biologist.
- Miriam Mukhaye - Member of Parliament (2022–2026).
- Lanie Banks - Canadian, Ugandan Rapper, Songwriter and Community Activist.
- Susan Amero - Female Ugandan Member of Parliament.
- Davinia Esther Anyakun - Ugandan Logistician and Politician.

== Historically notable administrators ==
- Connie Galiwango Nakayenze - Teacher (1995 - 2003).

== See also ==
- Nabumali High School.
- Namilyango College.
- King's College, Buddo.
