= Connie Galiwango Nakayenze =

Ugandan Member of Parliament

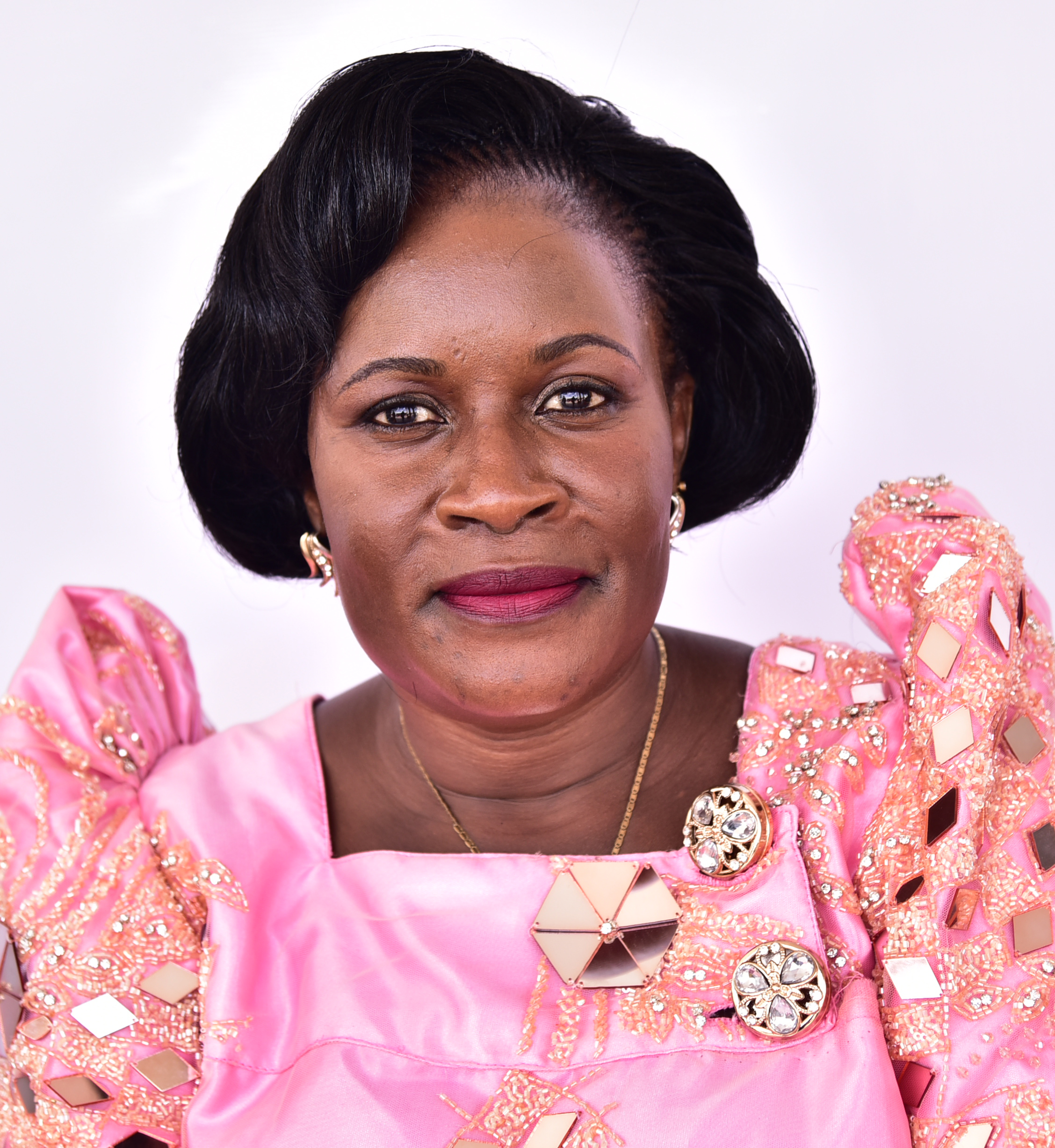
- Born: 31 August 1967 (age 58)
- Citizenship: Uganda
- Education: Gangama Primary School; Kabwangasi Primary Teachers College; Mbale Hall; National Teachers College, Nagongera; Islamic University in Uganda
- Occupations: Politician; Teacher
- Employer(s): Nabuyonga Primary School; Mbale S.S; Mbale High School; Parliament of Uganda
- Known for: Politics
- Political party: National Resistance Movement (NRM)

Connie Galiwango Nakayenze (born 31 August 1967) is a Ugandan politician and district women representative of Mbale City in Uganda's eleventh Parliament. Connie also served as a Member of Parliament in the ninth Parliament of Uganda. She is affiliated with the ruling party, the National Resistance Movement.

== Early life and education ==
Connie was born on 31 August 1967. She sat for her Primary Leaving Examinations (PLE) in 1981 at Gangama Primary School. She later attained a Grade III Teachers Certificate in 1989 from Kabwangasi Primary Teachers College and Uganda Advanced Certificate of Education (UACE) in 1992 from Mbale Hall. She also holds a Diploma in Secondary Education from National Teachers College, Nagongera (1995). In 2001, Connie was awarded a Bachelor of Arts in Social Sciences from the Islamic University in Uganda. This was followed by a Master of Arts in Education Management in 2008 from the same University.

== Personal life ==
Connie Galiwango is the widow of the late diplomat Hassan Wasswa Galiwango, who served as Uganda’s High Commissioner to Kenya and Seychelles, and Director of Finance and Administration for the National Resistance Movement (NRM). He died in January 2023 due to heart failure. They were married for over 25 years and had three children together.

== Career ==
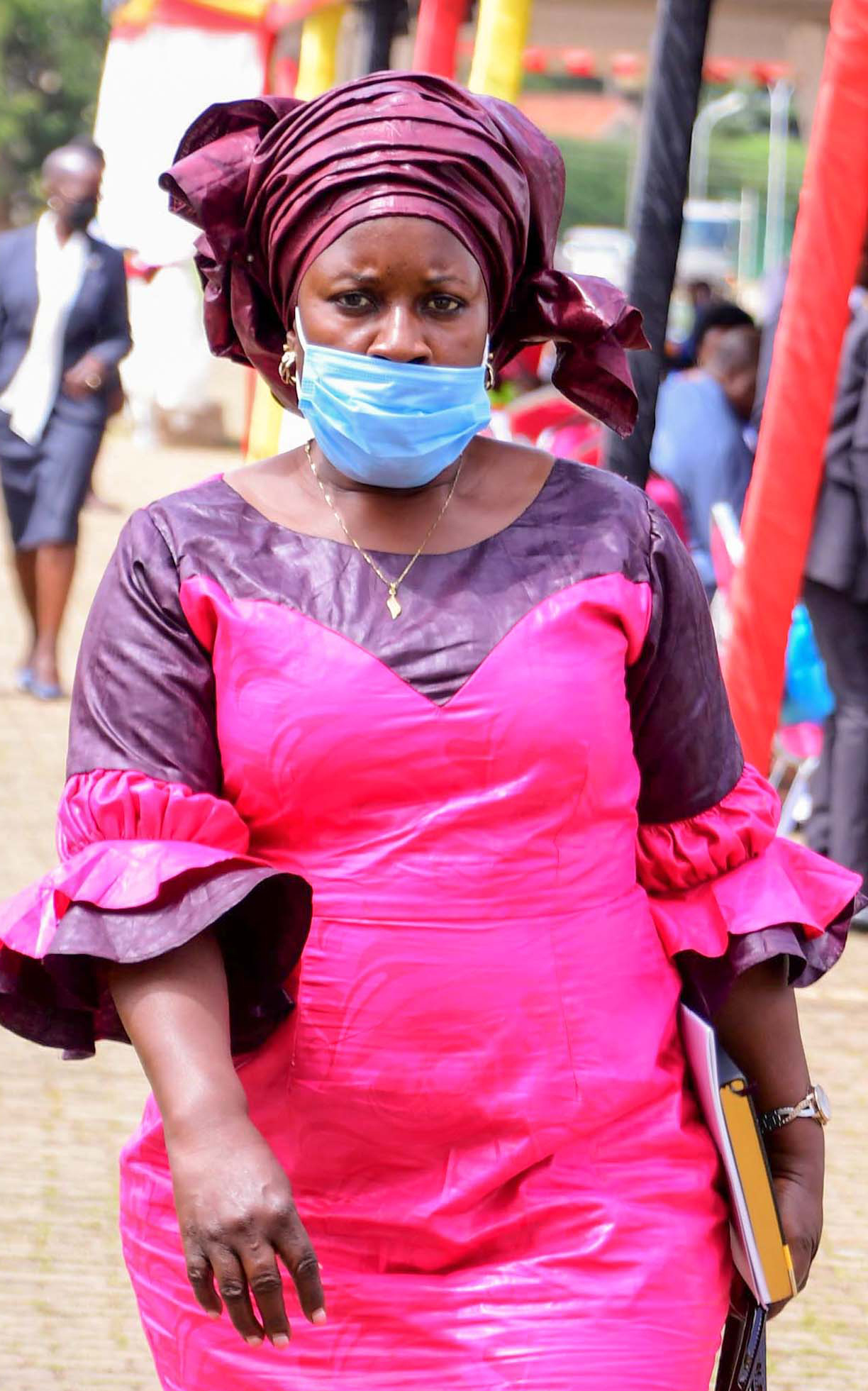
Connie Galiwango

Connie was a teacher at Nabuyonga Primary School between 1989 and 1993 before serving as a teacher at Mbale Secondary School (1995–2003) and Mbale High School (2003–2011). Between 2011 and 2016, she joined the Parliament of Uganda as a member of parliament. Connie was also voted for the eleventh parliament of Uganda during the 2021 January elections in Uganda.

In Uganda's tenth Parliament, she serves as the Chairperson of the Committee on Education & Sports. Additionally, she serves as a member of the Committee on HIV/AIDS & Related Diseases and a member of the Business Committee.

== See also ==
- Mbale District
- List of members of the eleventh Parliament of Uganda.
- List of members of the ninth Parliament of Uganda.
- List of members of the tenth Parliament of Uganda.
