= Matany Hospital =

Private hospital in Uganda

- Uganda Catholic Medical Bureau

Geography
- Location: Matany, Moroto, Moroto District, Uganda
- Coordinates: 02°26′40″N 34°23′42″E

Organisation
- Care system: Private
- Type: Community

Services
- Emergency department: I
- Beds: 226

History
- Founded: 1970

Links
- Website: Homepage
- Other links: Hospitals in Uganda

Saint Kizito Hospital Matany, commonly known as Matany Hospital is a private hospital in Matany Trading Centre, Moroto District, Karamoja sub-region, in the Northern Region of Uganda.

== Location ==
The hospital is located approximately 37 kilometres (23 mi), by road, southwest of Moroto, the nearest city and the location of the district headquarters.

Matany lies approximately 432 kilometres (268 mi), by road, northeast of Kampala, the capital of Uganda and the largest city in that East African country. The geographical coordinates of Matany Hospital are:02°26'40.0"N, 34°23'42.0"E (Latitude:2.444444; Longitude:34.395000).

== Overview ==
Matany Hospital is a private, non-profit, community hospital owned by the Roman Catholic Diocese of Moroto and is accredited by the Uganda Catholic Medical Bureau. The hospital is administered by Comboni Sisters, a religious congregation. The hospital has a capacity of 226 beds.

Matany Hospital Maintains an attached Nursing Training School, an airstrip (Matany Airstrip). Due its relatively well-maintained infrastructure, compared to nearby Moroto Regional Referral Hospital, Matany Hospital functions as a referral hospital for the Karamoja sub-region and for the nearby districts of Amuria, Kapelebyong, Katakwi and Soroti.

== History ==
St. Kizito Hospital, Matany was built in the early 1970s with assistance from MISEREOR, a German religious organization, at the invitation of the Comboni Missionaries. Construction began in 1970 and was completed in 1974. The hospital has received funding from numerous benefactors from various countries, including Germany, Italy and Denmark, among others.

== See also ==
- Hospitals in Uganda
