= Tonny Stone Luggya =

Ugandan researcher, doctor, academic administrator (born 1971)

Luggya Tonny Stone
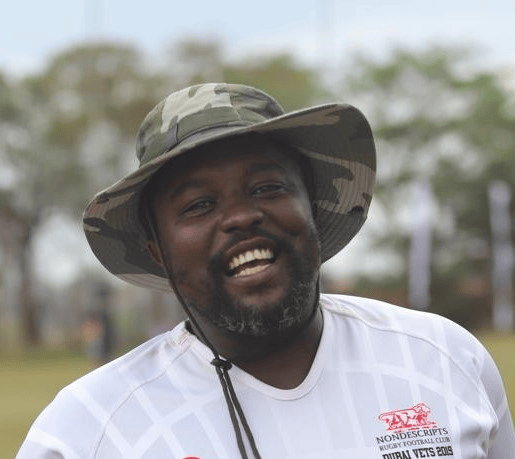
- Born: Anthony Fredrick Luggya; Mbale Hospital
- Other names: Stone Tonny Luggya, Luggya
- Education: Makerere University (Bachelor of Medicine and Surgery); Master of Medicine in Anesthesia; College of Anaesthesiologists of East, Central and Southern Africa (Fellow of College of Anaesthia); International Olympic Committee (Post Graduate Diploma in Sports Medicine)
- Occupations: researcher, Anaesthesiologist, sports administrator and academic
- Years active: 1998—present
- Known for: medical research, aneasthesia and emergency medicine
- Title: Head of Department of Anesthesia, School of Medicine, College of Health Sciences, at Makerere University

Anthony Fredrick Luggya, also known as Tonny Stone Luggya, is a Ugandan researcher, physician, anesthesiologist, academic, academic administrator, sports administrator and former rugby player. He is the head of the Department of Anesthesia and Emergency Medicine at the School of Medicine in the College of Health Sciences of Makerere University. He also is a staff anesthesiologist at the Mulago National Referral Hospital accident and emergency unit. He was an active player in the sport of rugby between 1997 and 2018. Since December 2021, he has been the chairman of Kampala Old Boys (KOBS) Rugby Football Club.

== Education ==
He attended Nakasero Primary School from where he attained his PLE certificate. For his O and A-level education certificates, he was educated at Namilyango College from 1996 to 2001. In 2002, he joined Makerere University School of Medicine where he did a Bachelor of Medicine and surgery from which he graduated in 2007. He went on to do his internship at Mulago National Specialised Hospital, after which he was admitted for his Master of Medicine degree specializing in Anesthesia focusing on Perioperative, Emergency, and Critical Care Medicine aspects.

== Career ==
He has worked in various medical organizations such as a Locum Medical Officer at Paragon Hospital (Bukoto Branch) (2009), a Medical officer at AAR Health Services Uganda (2010–2012), had an 8 weeks emergency medicine stint at Villa Somalia Medical Facility at Presidential Palace in Somalia, was Head of Department of Anaesthesia at CoRSU Rehabilitation Hospital (January 2012 – December 2012). He eventually started lecturing at the Department of Anesthesia and Critical Care at Makerere University, School of Medicine, College of Health Sciences in 2012 where he took up the Emergency Medicine Curriculum and oversaw the accreditation process to final registration by the National Council for Higher Education, that culminated in first MMED-EM class intake in the academic year 2018–2019 of Makerere University's From 2018– 2021, he was the Course Director for the new MMED Emergency Medicine program of the Department of Anesthesia. In 2018 he was promoted to senior lecturer and in May 2021 he was appointed the first substantive Chair of the Department of Anesthesia. currently promoted to level of Professor as at 4 February 2025 by the appointments committee of Makerere University.

== Athlete and sports administration ==
Between 1997 and 2018, Luggya was an active player in the sport of Rugby where he featured for KOBS Rugby Club (1998-2001) & (2007-2018), Rugaruga RFC (2001), and Makerere Impis Rugby Club (2003–2006). He made his senior debut with the Uganda 7s team in 2002 Safari 7's 7th edition and got his first full XV's cap in 2003 Vs Kenya XV's, also he was part of the Uganda national rugby union team (the Rugby Cranes) that won the Confederation of African Rugby (CAR) Africa Cup in 2007 after defeating Madagascar 42–11 in the final. He was club chairman of Makerere University Impis Rugby Club (2005–2006) and then crossed back as a player to KOBS RFC where he was players' representative to management (2011–2015) after which he was KOBS RFC Director of Rugby (2016–2021) from whence he was elected as the club's chairman.

== Research ==
He has broad interests in anesthesia, critical care, emergency medicine, and traumatology. He has published the finding of his research in Trauma, anesthesia, critical care, and emergency medicine in medical journals and other peer publications hence cited with an H-index of 17 with 88 citations. He has thus published research findings in over 17 peer-reviewed journals Scientific publications.
