= Lanie Banks =

Canadian-Ugandan rapper (born 1996)

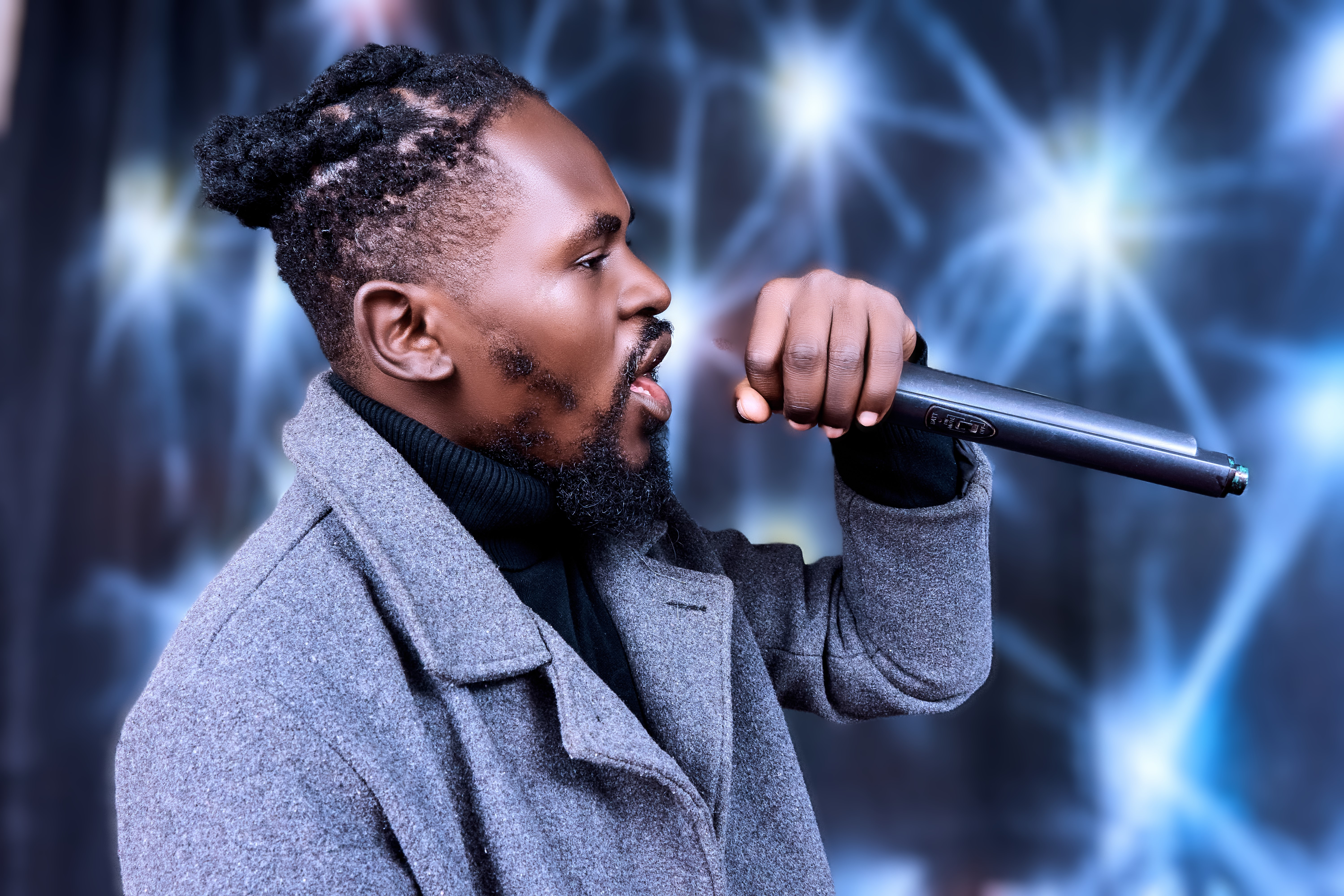
- Born: October 10, 1996 (age 29); Mbale, Uganda
- Education: Makerere University (B.S.W); St. Peter's Naalya (U.A.C.E); Mbale Secondary School (U.C.E); Nabuyonga Elementary School (P.L.E)
- Occupations: Rapper; Songwriter; Music Video Director; Community Activist
- Height: 1.75m (5 ft 9 in)
- Partner: Peace Nabududa
- Musical career
- Genres: Rap; Hip-Hop; Trap
- Instruments: Vocals; Drums
- Years active: 2015–present
- Labels: De Invincible Storm; OVO Sound
- Website: www.laniebanks.net

Lanie Banks (born Micheal Osings, October 10, 1996) is a Canadian-Ugandan rapper, songwriter, community activist and music video director. He has performed alongside Pallaso, Davido and Tory Lanez.

In December 2015, Osings began to record his songs and albums and launched his professional debut as a rapper.

== Early life and education ==
Micheal Osings was born at the Mbale Regional Referral Hospital; He grew up in Mbale City, Uganda where he almost spent half his entire childhood. He attended Nabuyonga Elementary School, Where he attained his Primary Leaving Examinations results. He proceeded to Mbale Senior Secondary School to attain his Uganda Certificate of Education; however, he later switched to St. Peters S.S.S Naalya, where he attained his Uganda Advanced Certificate of Education and Finally Makerere University Kampala at the College of Humanities and Social Sciences for his Bachelor's degree in Social Work and Social Administration.

== Musical career and awards ==
Osings got involved in multiple church and club performances during the initial phase of his musical career with an aim and objective of attracting music scout recognition but all was in vain because he had not literally recorded music at that time and solely relied on live performances.

Osingsgs later crossed paths with Kaz Kasozi and Maloui Klassien who were Jazz and Classic music teachers and the two music teachers invited Osings for music classes where he learned how to write songs and scripts.

He is the chief executive officer and owner of De Invincible Storm record label.

Osings won an award for best new rap act at the National Association of Nigerian Students Council awards.

As of May 2023, Osings is affiliated and signed to Canadian rapper Drake's label in a non 360 deal.

== Discography ==
Osings released singles like Tuna Bambika that were aimed at supporting his forthcoming albums

Free Man, The Two of Us, Good Feeling and Blow My Mind and many more.

== Family life ==
Osings is married to Peace Nabududa who is from Magale and the couple have a daughter Jedi Paris Osings. Micheal was born to Mrs. Irene Wondo (Mother) and Mr. Osings Didmus (Father). He grew up from a family of five and uncle Canon Andrew Nyote.

In late 2018, Osings immigrated to Canada where he is doing his music, focuses on hip-hop, rap, trap music, urban club music, and hence now has dual citizenship.

== Community activism ==
The Uganda Network of AIDS Support Organisations collaborated with Osings and his wife Peace to prepare and commemorate the World Tuberculosis Day that was marked on 24 March 2023. The training equipped the trainees who hailed from Eastern Uganda with Gender Based Violence, Sexual Gender Based Violence prevention skills, utilization of HIV, TB services like PEP and PrEP.

Osings also supported the homeless children in his hometown with aid.

During the COVID-19 pandemic Osings released a single titled "Coronavirus in Africa". The track featured many indigenous musicians who used multiple African languages to deliver COVID-19 related facts to the masses. Micheal Osings collaborated with Spotlight Initiative and UGANET to participate in the UNDP Elgon half marathon with Joshua Cheptegei, the event goals were to keep girls in school, protect the environment, end HIV&AIDS by 2030 and educating the community about the SASA methodology. He empathized with Rebecca Cheptegei by signing the Tororo commitment to end Gender-based Violence and supported people living with sickle cells in the 2024 sixteen days of activism.

== See also ==
- List of Canadian musicians
- List of Ugandan musicians
- Joshua Cheptegei
- Mbale District
