= Engola =

Engola is a surname. Notable people with the surname include:

- Charles Engola (born 1958), Ugandan politician and retired colonel
- Jean Jospin Engola (born 1997), Cameroonian footballer
- Sam Engola (born 1958), Ugandan businessman and politician
