= Soroti Hospital =

Public hospital in Uganda

Soroti Regional Referral Hospital
- Uganda Ministry of Health
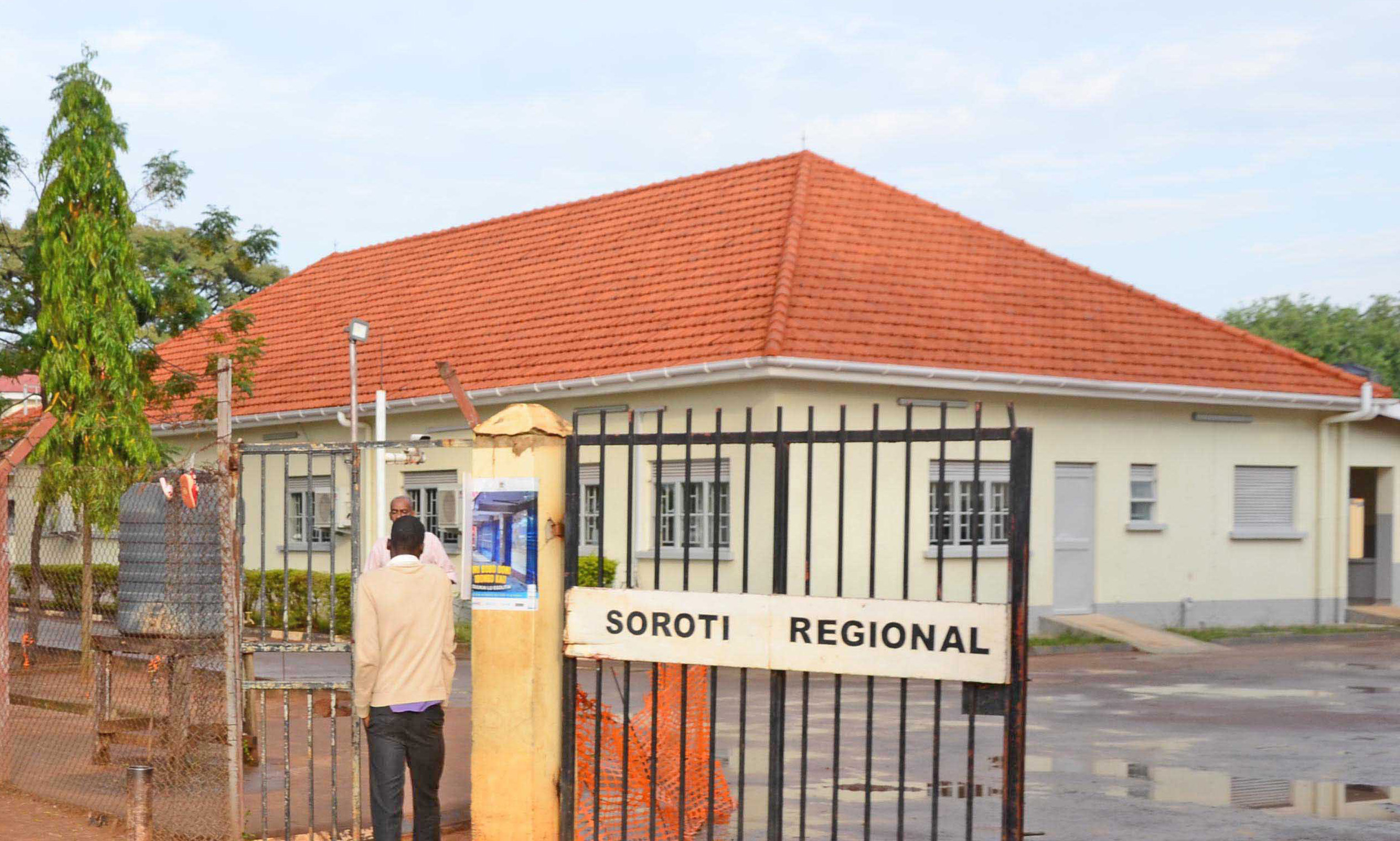

- Location within Uganda

Geography
- Location: Soroti, Soroti District, Eastern Region, Uganda
- Coordinates: 01°42′58″N 33°36′47″E

Organisation
- Care system: Public
- Type: General, Teaching

Services
- Emergency department: Level I
- Beds: 274

Links
- Other links: Hospitals in Uganda; Medical education in Uganda

Soroti Regional Referral Hospital, commonly known as Soroti Hospital is a hospital in the city of Soroti, in Soroti District, in Eastern Uganda. It is the referral hospital for the districts of Amuria, Bukedea, Kaberamaido, Kapelebyong, Katakwi, Kumi, Ngora, Serere and Soroti.

== Location ==
Soroti Hospital is located in the central business district of the city of Soroti, about 102 kilometres (63 mi), by road, northwest of Mbale Regional Referral Hospital, in the city of Mbale. This is approximately 123.5 kilometres (77 mi), southeast of Lira Regional Referral Hospital, in the city of Lira.

Soroti Regional Referral Hospital is located about 294 kilometres (183 mi), by road, northeast of Mulago National Referral Hospital, in Kampala, Uganda's capital city. The coordinates of Soroti Regional Referral Hospital are:1°42'58.0"N, 33°36'47.0"E (Latitude:1.716111; Longitude:33.613056).

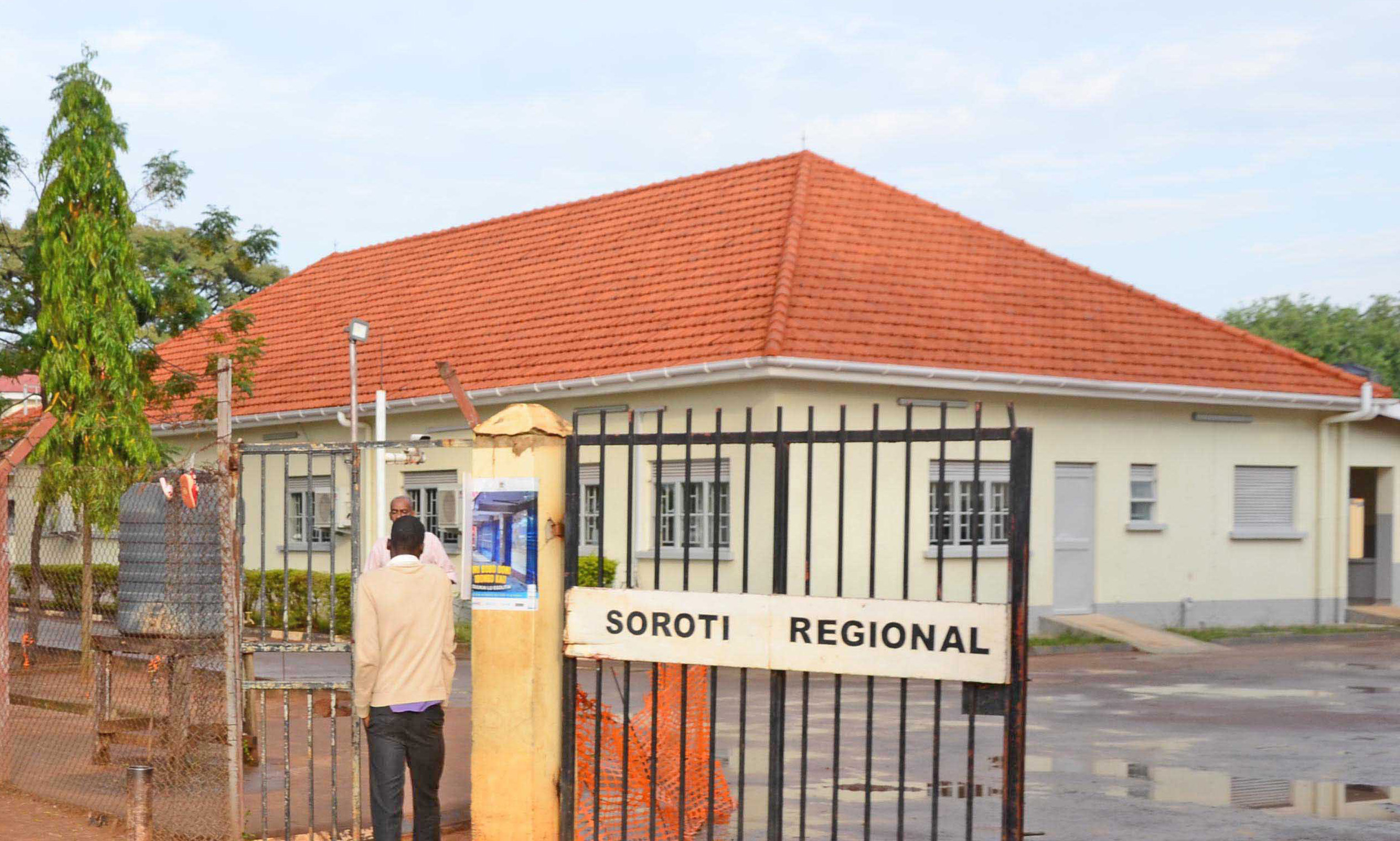

== Overview ==
Soroti Hospital is a public hospital, funded by the Uganda Ministry of Health and general care in the hospital is free. It is one of the 13 Regional Referral Hospitals in Uganda. The hospital is designated as one of the 15 Internship Hospitals in Uganda where graduates of Ugandan medical schools can serve one year of internship under the supervision of qualified specialists and consultants. The bed capacity of Soroti Hospital was quoted as 250, as of October 2000. In October 2020, the hospital's bed capacity was quoted at 274.

== Other considerations ==
The hospital was established in the mid 1920s as a treatment centre for syphilis. It was elevated to a district hospital in 1978 and it became a referral hospital in 1996.

Soroti Regional Referral Hospital is governed by a 19-person board, chaired by Dr Charles Vincent Ojoome, effective August 2019. Dr Michael Mwanga the hospital's executive director is the secretary to the hospital's board.

== See also ==
- Hospitals in Uganda
- Soroti University
- Soroti University School of Medicine and Health Sciences
