= Miriam Mukhaye =

Ugandan parliament member

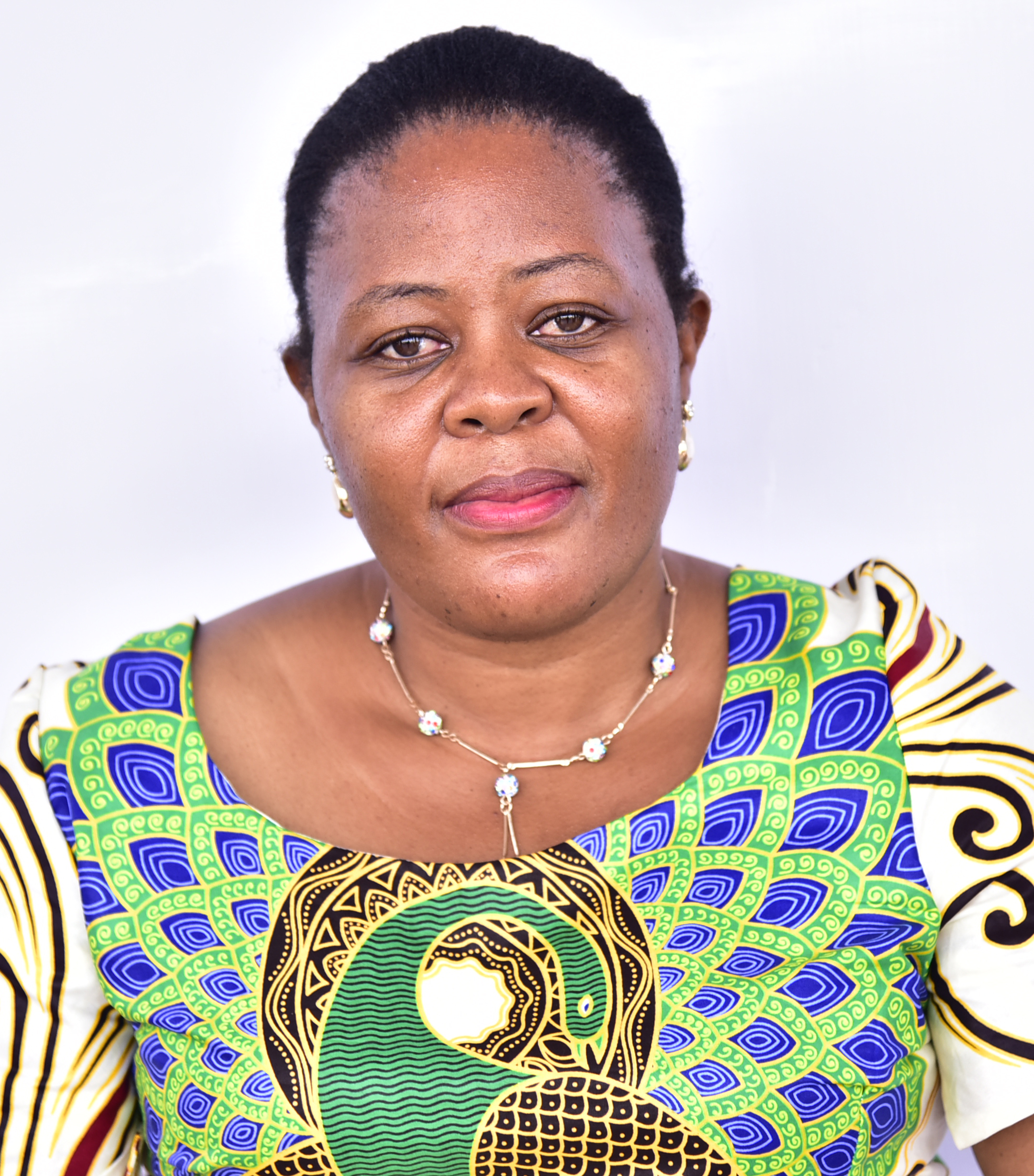

Woman Member of Parliament for Mbale District
- In office 2021–2026

Personal details
- Party: Independent
- Education: Islamic University in Uganda; Uganda Management Institute; Bubulo Girls High School; Mbale Secondary School
- Occupation: Politician
- Known for: Woman Member of Parliament for Mbale District

Miriam Mukhaye is a Ugandan politician who is an elected, independent Woman Member of Parliament for Mbale District from 2021 to 2026. She is also the CEO of Miriam Mukhaye Foundation, an initiative tasked with "mobilizing and supporting the needy grassroots community members (farmers) using personal funds".

== Early life and education ==
Mukhaye studied at the Bubulo Girls High School and Mbale Secondary School.She then received a bachelor's degree in public administration from Islamic University in Uganda, followed by a post-graduate diploma in human resource management from Uganda Management Institute in Kampala.

== Political career ==
Mukhaye came to parliament in 2021 after winning the elections as an independent. She also served in different capacities and committees, including the Equal Opportunities Committee, Gender, Labor and Social Development Committee at Parliament of Uganda. As a leader, she has participated in the Environment Parliament debates toi highling environmental concerns in her constituency.

In the 2026 General elections, she was re-elected on the National Resistance Movement ticket to the 12th parliament.

== See also ==
- Anet Anita Among
- Cecilia Atim Ogwal
- Thomas Tayebwa
- Faith Nakut
