= Francis Omaswa =

Ugandan cardiovascular surgeon, researcher and academic

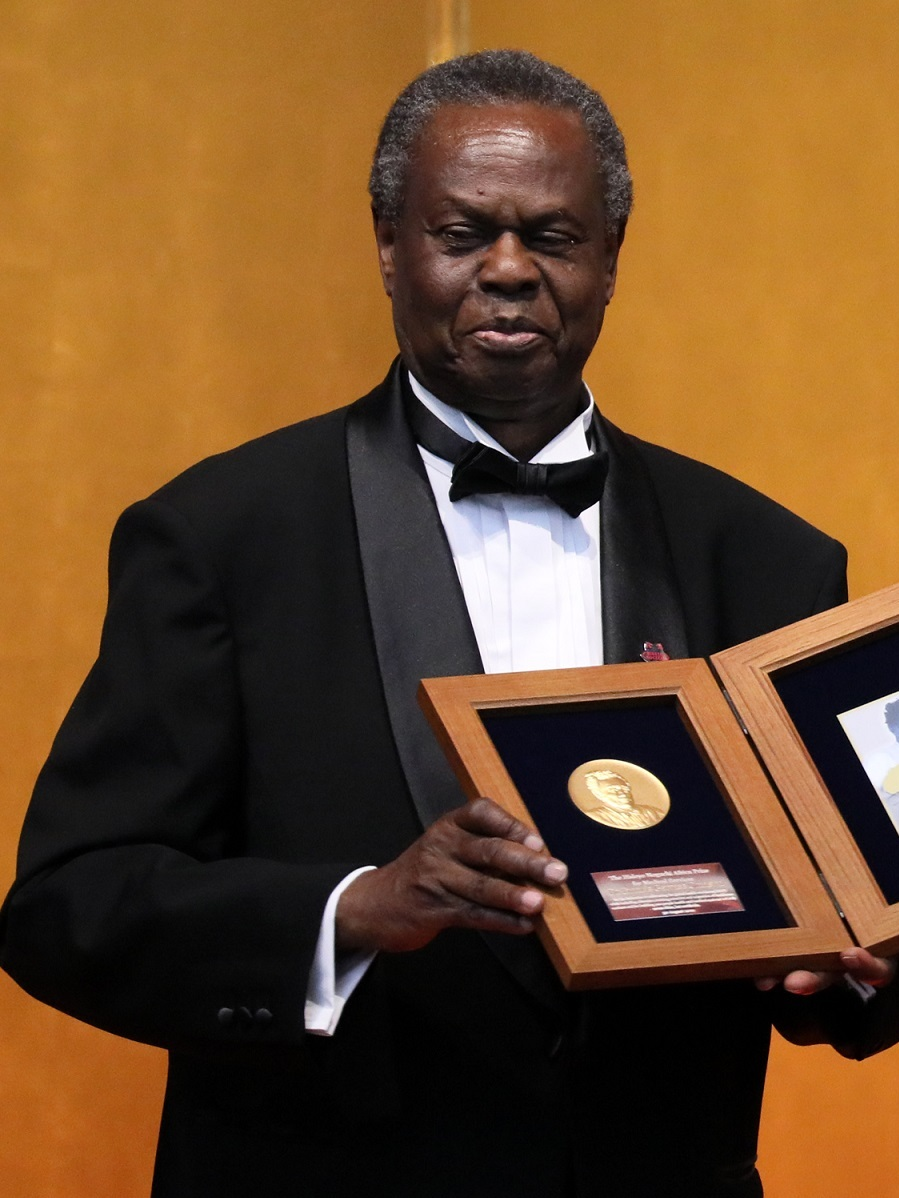
- Born: 1943 (age 82–83); Mukura, Kumi District, Uganda
- Citizenship: Uganda
- Education: Makerere University (Bachelor of Medicine and Bachelor of Surgery) (MMed in Surgery); Royal College of Surgeons of Edinburgh (Fellow of the Royal College of Surgeons); College of Surgeons of East, Central and Southern Africa (Fellow of the COSECSA)
- Occupations: Cardiothoracic surgeon, academic, academic administrator
- Years active: 1969–present
- Known for: Academics and administration
- Title: Chancellor; Soroti University
- Spouse: Catherine Nyapidi Omaswa

Francis Gervase Omaswa (born in 1943) is a Ugandan cardiovascular surgeon, academic and administrator. He was installed as the chancellor of Soroti University, one of the nine public universities in Uganda at that time, in August 2022.

He previously served as the chancellor of Busitema University, another Ugandan public university, between 2009 and 2017. He has served in that capacity since June 2009.

== Background, education, and personal life ==
Omaswa was born in Mukura Village, Kumi District, in the Eastern Region of Uganda, circa 1943. His parents were Yafesi Ijookit and Matilda Acom.

He attended Mukura Primary School from P1 to P4, then transferred to Koloin Primary School from P5 to P6. After passing his Pprimary Leaving Examinations, he joined Holy Angels Junior Secondary School in Soroti District for his Junior One and Two. He then studied at St. Mary's College Kisubi, for both his O-Level and A-Level education.

In 1964, he was admitted to the Makerere University School of Medicine, graduating in 1969 with a Bachelor of Medicine and Bachelor of Surgery degree. In 1974, he received a Master of Medicine in surgery degree from Makerere University.

He subsequently was elected a fellow of the Royal College of Surgeons of Edinburgh. He is also a fellow of the College of Surgeons of East, Central and Southern Africa, a college he helped found.

Omaswa is married to Dr. Catherine Nyapidi Omaswa, an anesthesiologist, also a graduate of Makerere.

== Career ==
Following his internship, Omaswa worked as a medical officer from 1970 until September 1974, when he left for further studies in the United Kingdom. He trained as a cardiothoracic surgeon. He then worked for the National Health Service (NHS), eventually becoming a senior registrar in cardio-thoracic surgery there.

In 1979, he accepted an invitation by the Kenyan Government to become the head of cardio-thoracic surgery at Kenyatta National Hospital and the University of Nairobi. He worked in that capacity until 1982. From 1983 until 1986, he served as the medical director and chief of surgery at Ngora Freda Carr Hospital, in Ngora, Teso sub-region. From 1987 until 1992 he served as the first medical director of Uganda Heart Institute, which he helped to establish. He concurrently served as Professor of Surgery at Makerere University School of Medicine. From 1992 until 1999, he served as the chief government surgeon and head of the Quality Assurance Program that he established at the Ministry of Health. In April 1999, he became the director general of health services at the Uganda Ministry of Health, a position he held until 2005 when the WHO director general, Dr. Margaret Chan, invited him to set up the Global Health Workforce Alliance (GHWA). He moved to Geneva, Switzerland to set up the alliance. He returned to Uganda in 2008 and was appointed chancellor at Busitema University in 2009.

== Other responsibilities ==
Omaswa has a very active professional life. In addition to the tasks outlined above, he has the following responsibilities:

- Member, Board of Directors, Uganda Heart Institute
- Member of the Institute of Medicine – elected in November 2014
- Chairman of the task force to set up Teso University, a proposed private institution of higher education, based in Soroti

== Honours and awards ==
- 2019 Hideyo Noguchi Africa Prize in the Medical Services category
- In 1991 he was knighted with the rank of Officer (Brother) of the Order of St John.

== Academic authorship ==
He has also contributed greatly toward medicine through his research which is well documented by reputable journals and other scholarly publishers and some of his work includes:

- Managing Ebola from rural to urban slum settings: experiences from Uganda. This study established that palliative care improved survival and that focusing on treatment and not just quarantine should be emphasized as it also enhanced public trust and health seeking behavior.
- The medical education partnership initiative (MEPI): innovations and lessons for health professions training and research in Africa. This study documented the implementation of MEPI which was a $130 million competitively awarded grant by the President's Emergency Plan for AIDS Relief (PEPFAR) and National Institutes of Health (NIH) to 13 medical schools in 12 Sub-Saharan African countries and a coordinating centre (CC).
- Informal health workers: to be encouraged or condemned? This paper outlined the role of informal health workers in settings where there are challenges with the formal health systems
- Global health partnerships and the Brocher Declaration: principles for ethical short-term engagements in global health. This study outlines the declaration's strategies aimed at providing guidance for effective implementation of appropriate global health efforts. Building communities of practice MEPI creates a commons.
- The next WHO Director-General's highest priority: a Global Treaty on the Human Right to Health. The article discusses the major challenges that the director general should pay attention to.
- The contribution of the medical education partnership initiative to Africa's renewal. This paper outlines the role of MEPI in transforming Africa's health sector.
- Strengthening health systems in low-income countries by enhancing organizational capacities and improving institutions. The paper established that an increasingly dynamic and interdependent post-Millennium Development Goals (post-MDG) world requires new ways of working to improve global health, underpinned by a complex adaptive systems lens and approaches that build local organizational capacity.
- Abolition of cost-sharing is pro-poor: evidence from Uganda. The study documented the effects of the abolition of user fees on utilization of health services in Uganda with emphasis on poor and vulnerable groups.
- Competency-based medical education in two Sub-Saharan African medical schools. The study found out that show that CBME can be implemented even for the low-resourced countries in Africa, supported by external investments to address the human resources gap.
- Contact tracing and the COVID-19 response in Africa: Best practices, key challenges, and lessons learned from Nigeria, Rwanda, South Africa, and Uganda.
- Medical Education Partnership Initiative gives birth to AFREhealth.

== See also ==
- Soroti University
- Specioza Kazibwe
- Mondo Kagonyera
- Frederick Kayanja
- Solomon Suubi

Preceded by None	Chancellor of Busitema University; 2009 – present	Succeeded by Incumbent
