= Busitema =

- Map of Uganda showing the location of Busitema
- Coordinates: 00°34′21″N 34°03′00″E
- Country: Uganda
- District: Busia District
- Elevation: 1,080 m (3,540 ft)
- Time zone: UTC+3 (EAT)

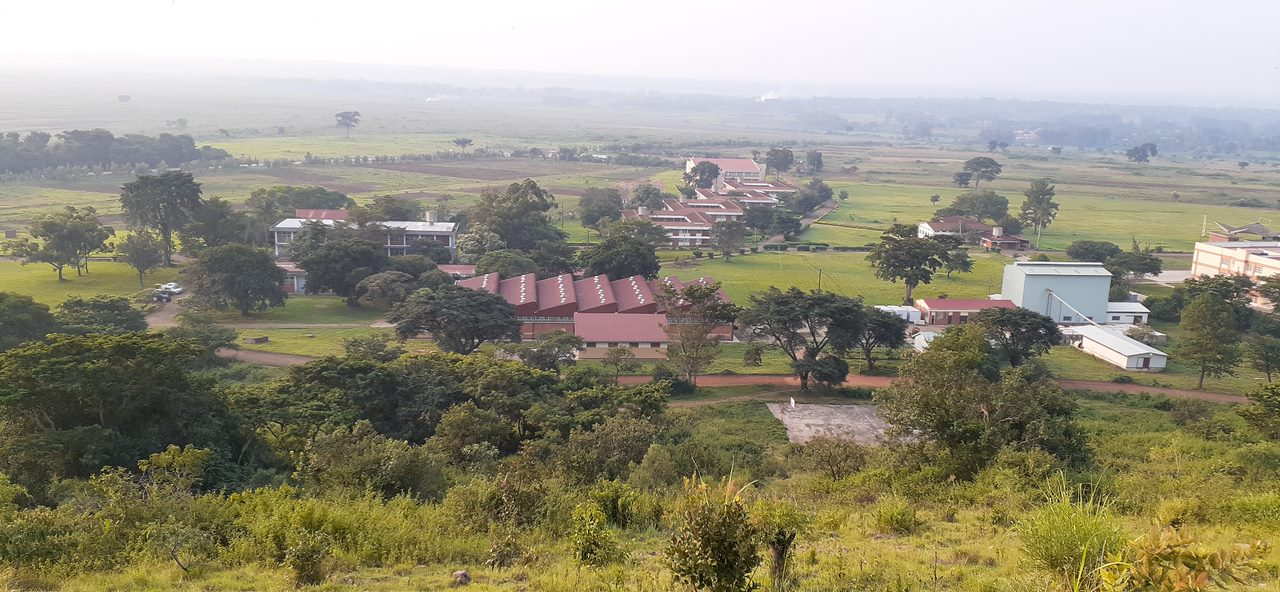
Aerial view of Busitema area taken at one of the Busitema hills in Busitema University main campus

Busitema is a settlement in eastern Uganda. It is the location of the Main Campus of Busitema University, one of the public universities in Uganda.

== Location ==
Busitema is located approximately 23 km (14 mi), by road, northwest of Busia, where the district headquarters are located. This location is approximately 26 km (16 mi), by road, southwest of Tororo, the largest town in the sub-region.

== Population ==
As of April 2010, the exact population of Busitema was not known.

== Landmarks ==
The landmarks within the town limits or close to the edges of town include:

- The main campus of Busitema University - The university maintains six other campuses in various locations in Eastern Uganda.
- The Jinja–Iganga–Bugiri–Tororo Road Road - The road passes through Busitema.
