= Bugisu Co-operative Union Limited =

Trade union in Uganda

The Bugisu Cooperative Union (BCU) is a Ugandan agricultural cooperative federation, established in July 1954 by a group of coffee farmers led by Samson Kitutu.

== Overview ==
BCU is owned by coffee farmers who are organised in primary societies. Each primary society keeps a register of its fully paid-up members who elect a committee, which manages society's affairs. Each Primary society is represented by two delegates at an Annual General Meeting. In addition to other functions the AGM elects Board members who in turn appoint and supervise the management team. BCU also operates according to International Co-operatives Principles.

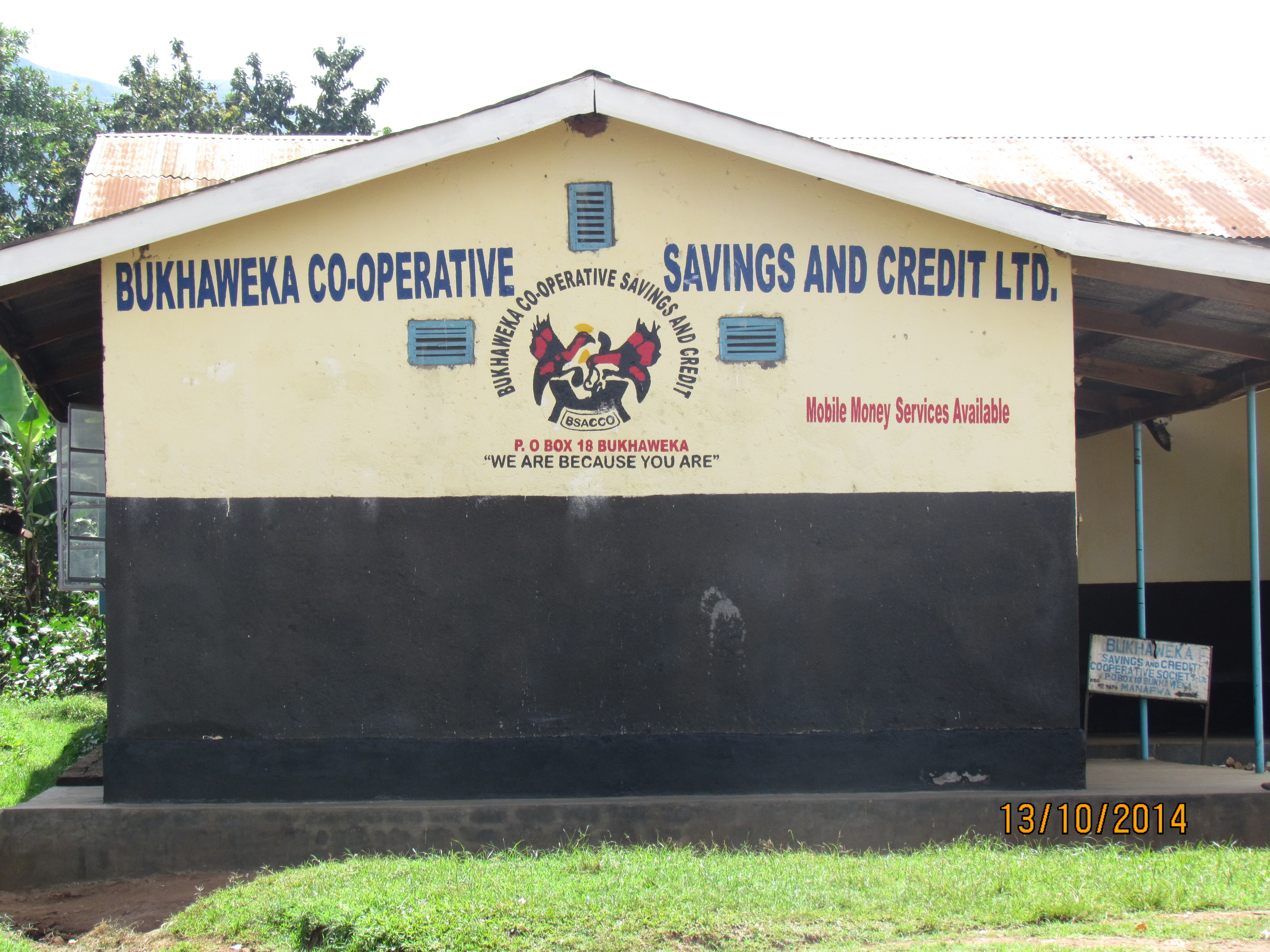
Bukaweka coffee growers society

== Methods of Farming ==
The Arabica coffee in Bugisu grows on volcanic soils at an altitude of between 3800 ft and 14700 ft above sea level. The roasted Arabica coffee beans have a mild sweet aroma and good taste. Arabica coffee is grown on small gardens owned by individual farmers . This coffee is mostly organically grown but in some cases fertilizers are applied.

Arabica coffee seedlings at bugisu cooperative union

== Processing ==
Primary Processing involves the pulping of ripe coffee cherries, the fermenting, the washing thoroughly with clean water and drying it on wire mesh placed two meters above the ground to avoid contamination.

In addition, BCU owns central pulperies where coffee berries are pulped on large scale and dried under controlled temperatures. After the coffee has dried the farmer sells it to the primary society, which in turn delivers it to BCU mill. At BCU curing works, coffee is inspected, tasted for moisture content and weighed before it is stored in the soil.

== Location ==
BCU Ltd is situated on Plot 46 Pallisa Road in Mbale town in Bugisu sub-region in Eastern Uganda. It is 256 kilometers (160 miles) from Kampala, the capital city. Bugisu is found on the slopes of Mount Elgon.
