= James Mutende =

Ugandan politician (1962–2015)

James Shinyabulo Mutende
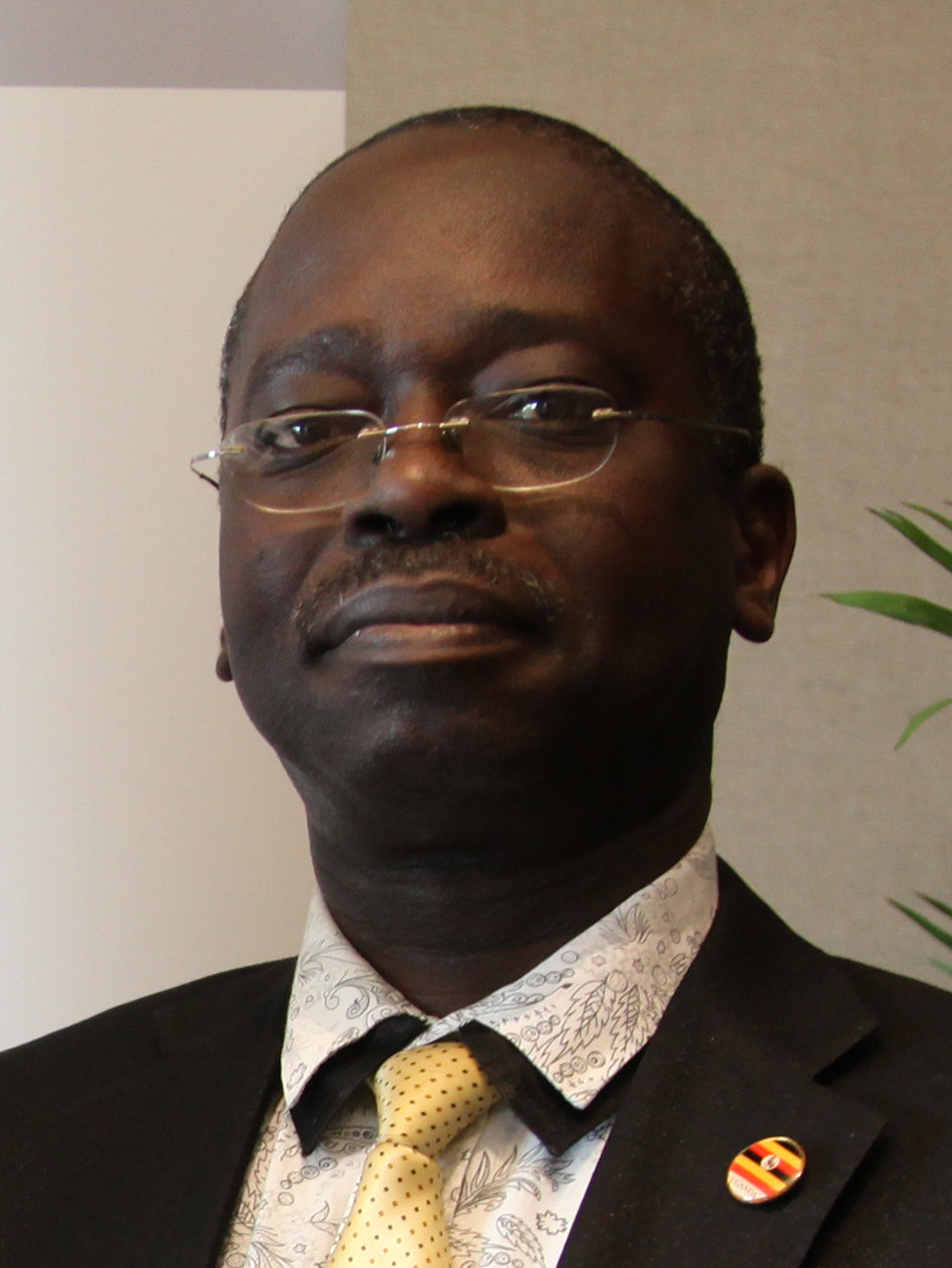
- James Mutende (2013)
- Born: 26 February 1962; Mbale, Uganda
- Died: 2 October 2015 (aged 53); Makindye, Uganda
- Citizenship: Uganda
- Education: Makerere University (Bachelor of Veterinary Medicine) (Master of Business Administration); New School University (Doctor of Philosophy in Economics)
- Occupations: Economist, Politician & Academic
- Years active: 1987 — 2015
- Known for: Politics
- Title: State Minister of Industry
- Spouse: (Lydia Wanyoto Mutende)

James Shinyabulo Mutende (26 February 1962 – 2 October 2015) was a Ugandan veterinarian, economist, academic and politician. He was the State Minister of Industry in the Ugandan Cabinet from 27 May 2011 until his death. He replaced Father Simon Lokodo, who was appointed State Minister for Ethics & Integrity in the Office of the President. On account of being a cabinet minister, James Mutende was also an ex officio Member of Parliament.

== Early life and education ==
Mutende was born in Mbale, on 26 February 1962. After attending local schools, he was admitted to Busoga College Mwiri, an all-boys boarding secondary school near Kakira in Jinja District. He graduated from Busoga College Mwiri, with the Uganda Certificate of Education in 1980 and with the Uganda Advanced Certificate of Education in 1983. In 1984, he was admitted to Makerere University to study veterinary medicine, graduating in 1988 with the degree of Bachelor of Veterinary Medicine. In 1999, he was awarded the degree of Master of Business Administration, also by Makerere University. Later, in 2005, he received the degree of Doctor of Philosophy in Economics from New School University in New York City. He died on 2 October 2015.

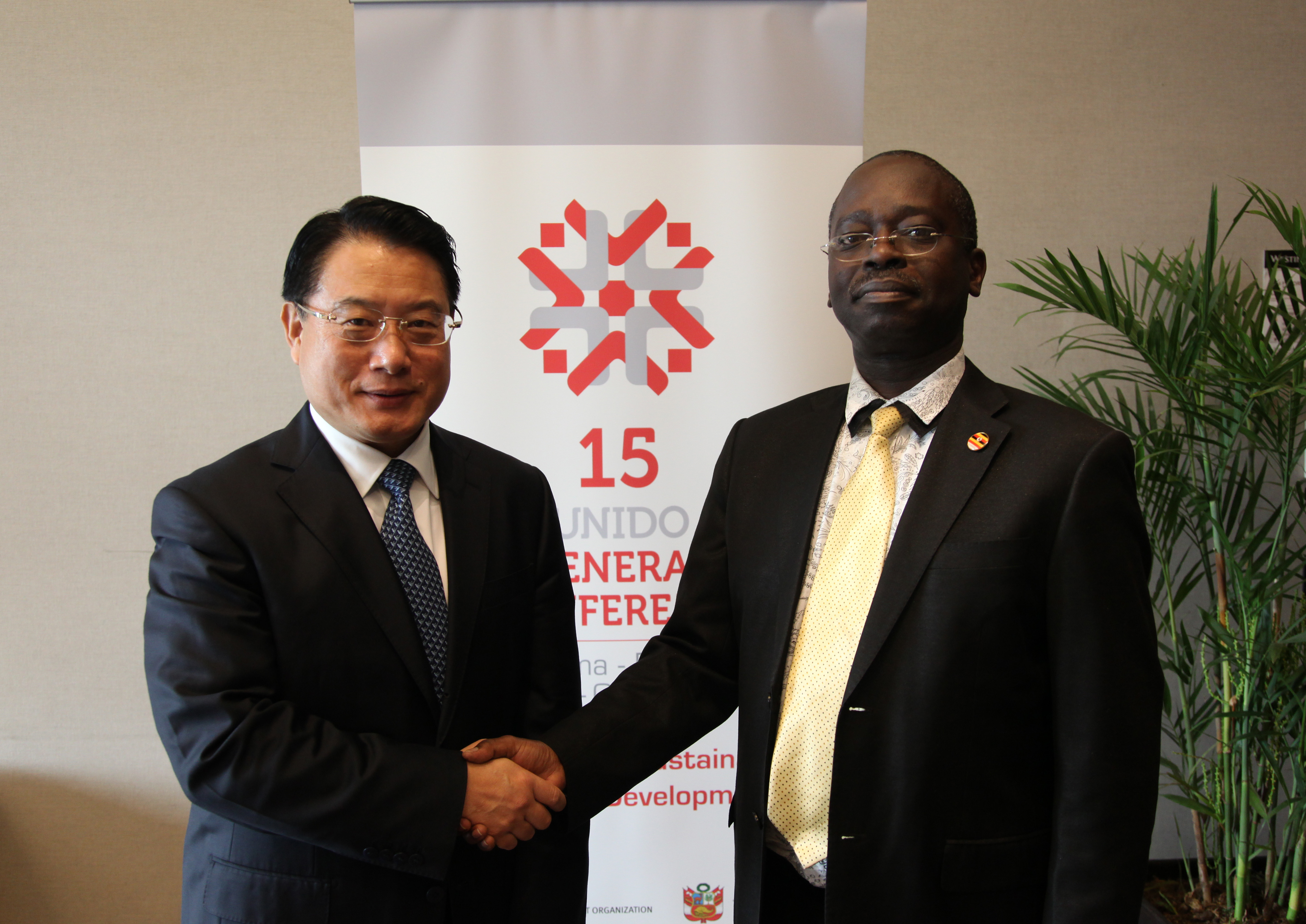
2013-DG Li and Uganda's Minister of State for Industry Shinyabulo-Mutende

== Career ==
He began his career as a teaching assistant at Makerere University in 1987, during his final undergraduate year, whereby he continued with the same role until 1989. From 1989 until 1994, he worked as a manager of one of the branches of then government-owned Uganda Commercial Bank. From 1988 until 2009, he worked with the Uganda Investment Authority as an Investment Officer. From 2003 until 2005, he pursued his doctorate in New York, while working part-time as an assistant professor of economics at The New School and concurrently carrying out financial development research at the United Nations offices in New York City. In May 2011, he was named the State Minister of Industry and Technology.

== Personal life ==
Mutende came from a family of distinguished technocrats and politicians. His father Michael Mutende was the first Ugandan Town Clerk of Mbale Municipality, from 1964 until 1974. His uncle James Francis Wapakhabulo was Uganda's foreign minister at the time of his death in 2004. Mutende, a holder of a PhD in economics, was one of the three most highly educated ministers in Museveni's current government.

He was married to Lydia Wanyoto.

== See also ==
- Cabinet of Uganda
- Parliament of Uganda
- Government of Uganda
