= Busitema University =

Public university in Uganda

Busitema University (BU)
- Busitema University logo
- Motto: Pursuing Excellence
- Type: Public
- Established: 2007
- Chancellor: Badru Kiggundu
- Vice-Chancellor: Paul Waako
- Administrative staff: 60+ (2019)
- Students: ~3000+ (2019)
- Location: Busitema, Uganda; 00°32′42″N 34°01′30″E
- Campus: Rural
- Website: www.busitema.ac.ug
- Location within Uganda

Busitema University (BU) is a university in Uganda. It is one of the public universities and degree-awarding institutions in the country. It has six different campuses around the country; all situated in the Eastern Region of Uganda. The university also has a study center in the town of Tororo, focusing on short and skill-based training courses.

BU has its main focus on the instruction of agricultural sciences, agricultural mechanization, and agribusiness. That is Engineering, Science Education, Health Sciences, Natural Resources and Environmental Sciences, Agriculture and Animal Sciences, Management Sciences and Vocational Education.

== Location ==
BU has its main campus in Busitema, Busia District on the Jinja - Tororo Highway, about 26 kilometres (16 mi), by road, southwest of Tororo, the nearest large town. This location lies approximately 186 kilometres (116 mi), by road, east of Kampala, Uganda's capital and largest city. The coordinates of the university's main campus are 0°32'42.0"N, 34°01'30.0"E (Latitude:0.5450; Longitude:34.0250).

== University campuses ==
The campuses of BU include the following:

- Main campus in Busia District - Faculty of Engineering (Busitema) - 1,300 acres (530 ha)
- Jinja campus - Non-operative - 9 acres (3.6 ha)
- Nagongera campus in Tororo District - Faculty of Science and Education - 850 acres (340 ha)
- Mbale campus in Mbale District - Faculty of Health Sciences - 30 acres (12 ha)
- Kaliro campus in Kaliro District - Non-operative - 198 acres (80 ha)
- Pallisa campus in Pallisa District 350 acres (140 ha)
- Arapai campus in Soroti District - Faculty of Agriculture and Animal Sciences - 675 acres (273 ha)
- Namasagali campus in Kamuli District - Faculty of Natural Resources and Environmental Sciences - 0 acres (0 ha)

== Academics ==
As of June 2019, the university offered the following courses:

=== Undergraduate degree courses ===
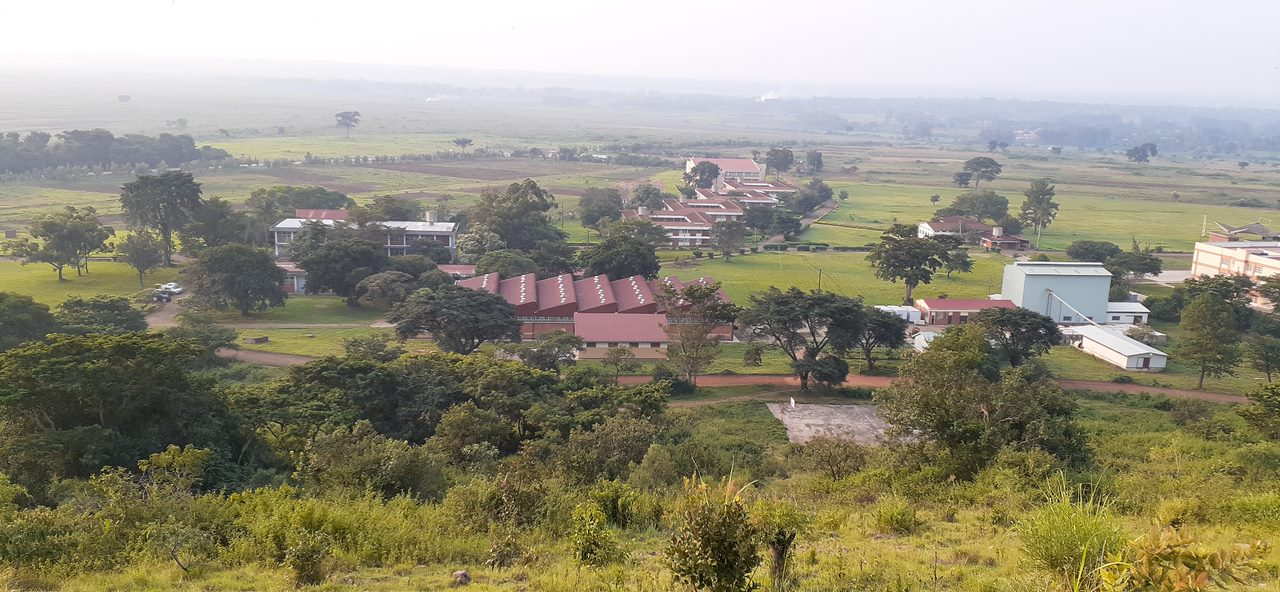
Busitema University Main Campus

==== Faculty of Science and Education ====
- Bachelor of Science Education in computer studies - 3 years - Nagongera campus
- Bachelor of Science Education in physics - 3 years - Nagongera campus
- Bachelor of Science Education in mathematics 3 years - Nagongera campus
- Bachelor of Science Education in education - 3 years - Nagongera campus

==== Faculty of Agriculture and Animal Sciences ====
- Bachelor of Animal Production and Management - 3 years - Arapai campus
- Bachelor of Science in Agriculture - 4 years - Arapai campus
- Bachelor of Agribusiness - 3 years - Arapai campus

==== Faculty of Engineering ====
- Bachelor of Science in agricultural mechanization & irrigation engineering - 4 years - Main campus
- Bachelor of Science in computer engineering - 4 years - Main campus
- Bachelor of Science in water resources engineering - 4 years - Main campus
- Bachelor of Science in Polymer, Textile and Industrial Engineering - 4 years - Main campus
- Bachelor of Science in mining engineering - 4 years - Main campus
- Bachelor of Science in Ago-processing Engineering- 4 years- main campus

==== Faculty of Natural Resources and Environmental Sciences ====
- Bachelor of Science in natural resources economics (NRE) - 3 years - Namasagali campus
- Bachelor of Science in Hydrology - 4 years - Namasagali campus
- Bachelor of Science in Fisheries and Water Resource Management (FWR) - 3 years - Namasagali campus

==== Faculty of Health Sciences ====
- Bachelor of Medicine and Bachelor of Surgery - 5 years - Mbale campus, Mbale Regional Referral Hospital
- Bachelor of Science in Nursing - 3 years - Mbale campus, Mbale Regional Referral Hospital

=== Undergraduate diploma courses ===
==== Faculty of Agriculture and Animal Sciences ====
- Diploma in Agricultural Engineering - 2 years - Busitema campus
- Diploma in Ginning Engineering - 2 years - Busitema campus
- Diploma in Animal Production and Management - 2 years - Arapai campus
- Diploma in Crop Production and Management - 2 years - Arapai campus
- Diploma in electronics and electrical engineering - 2 years - Busitema campus

=== Undergraduate certificate courses ===
- Faculty of Agriculture and Animal Sciences
  - Certificate in General Agriculture - 2 years - Arapai campus

=== Postgraduate courses ===
Busitema university currently offers eighteen (18) postgraduate programs.

- Faculty of Health Sciences (Mbale )
  - Master of Medicine in Internal Medicine - 3 years - Mbale campus, Mbale Regional Referral Hospital
  - Master of Public Health - 2 years Mbale campus, Mbale Regional Referral Hospital
- Faculty of Science and Education (Nagongera)
  - Masters of Educational Leadership and Management - 2 Years
  - Masters of Master of Science in Industrial Mathematics
  - Master of Science in Physics - 2 Years
  - Master in Educational Psychology - 2 Years
- Faculty of Natural Resources and Environmental Sciences (Namasagali)
  - Master of Science in Climate Change and Disaster Management - 2 Years
  - Master of Science in Environmental Economics - 2 Years
- Faculty of Engineering and Technology (Busitema)
  - Doctor of Philosophy in Materials Engineering - 3 Years
  - Master of Science in Materials Engineering - 2 Years
  - Doctor of Philosophy in Energy Engineering - 3 Years
  - Master of Science in Sustainable Energy Engineering
  - Postgraduate Diploma in Computer Forensics - 1 Year
  - Master of Computer Forensics
  - Master of Science in Artificial Intelligence
  - Master of Science in Irrigation and Drainage Engineering

Other Postgraduate courses at Busitema University are;

- Doctor of Philosophy in Business Administration and Management
- Master of Business Administration

== See also. ==
- Agriculture in Uganda
- Education in Uganda
- List of universities in Uganda
- List of hospitals in Uganda
