= Robert Ikoja-Odongo =

Ugandan academic and academic administrator

- Born: 1950 (age 75–76); Soroti, Uganda
- Education: Makerere University (Bachelor of Arts); University of Stirling (MPhil in Publishing Studies); University of Zululand (PhD in Library & Information Science)
- Occupations: Academic and Academic Administrator
- Years active: 1980 — present
- Known for: Academics
- Title: Vice Chancellor; Soroti University

Professor Robert Ikoja-Odongo, also Robert Ikoja Odongo or simply Robert Ikoja (born 1950), is a Ugandan academic and academic administrator. He is the current Vice Chancellor of Soroti University, a public University in Uganda.

== Background and education ==
He was born in Soroti, Uganda, circa 1950. He holds the degree of Bachelor of Arts, awarded by Makerere university, the largest and oldest public university in the country. He also holds the degree of Master of Philosophy in Publishing Studies, obtained from the University of Stirling in Scotland. His degree of Doctor of Philosophy in Library and Information Science, was obtained from the University of Zululand in South Africa.

== Career ==
Ikoja-Odongo has worked in various roles in Makerere University, including as:

- Principal of the College of Computing and Information Sciences
- Head of Makerere University Institute of Psychology
- Lecturer at the university's East African School of Library and Information Science.

In August 2012, he was named Vice-Chancellor of the then newly created Soroti University and was named to head the task-force charged with establishing the university.

== Academic Authorship ==
He has over the years of his career participated in research studies most especially in the field of library science and information science which have made him one of the top experts in the country. Some of his work includes;

Information needs and information-seeking behavior of artisan fisher folk of Uganda. This study revealed that fisher folk require different kinds of information to carry out fishing activities effectively.

Information seeking behavior of the informal sector entrepreneurs: The Uganda experience.The results suggested that modern/exotic models of information transfer based on textual media and ICT exhibit less impact on the entrepreneurs' information needs and use at macro levels because of poverty, illiteracy and poor information infrastructure.

Application of information and communication technology (ICT) in health information access and dissemination in Uganda. The study established that a number of challenges must be addressed if the full benefit of the use and application of ICT in health information access and dissemination is to be realized in Uganda.

The impact of cybercafes on information services in Uganda. The study suggested that ICT policies be instituted and computers and the Internet be made part of the school curriculum to equip Ugandans with the necessary skills and to extend these new Internet services to the Ugandan rural community as well.

Information needs and use among urban farmers in Kampala district in Uganda. This study emphasized the need to disseminate agricultural information in Kampala City to be based on the urban farmers' enterprise groups and their information needs.

A study of information needs and uses of the informal sector of Uganda. The study determined the information needs and uses of the informal sector in Uganda.

Public library politics: The Ugandan perspective. The article established the feelings of respondents on the importance of public library services and the problems affecting them.

A framework for developing a knowledge base for indigenous ecological knowledge in Uganda. This article presented a framework for documenting indigenous knowledge in Uganda and raised issues to document and use develop the framework.

An observational study of the information seeking and communicating behaviour of enterprenures in the informal sector in Uganda. The study established that entrepreneurs seek and communicate information mostly informally and orally.

Private camel library brings hope to pastoralists: the Kenyan experience. The article discusses an innovation in the Kenya National Library Service, the Camel Library Service (CLS) in North Eastern Province, Kenya.

Uganda's public library system and services from colonial times to the present. The article traced the history of the Public Library Service in Uganda from colonial times.

== Other responsibilities ==
Professor Robert Ikoja-Odongo is a married father.

== See also ==
- Uganda Medical Schools
- Uganda Universities
- UG University Leaders
- SUCHS
- Soroti District

Preceded by None	Vice Chancellor of Soroti University; 2012–present	Succeeded by Incumbent
