= Werikhe Kafabusa =

Ugandan politician

- Born: 25 August 1955 (age 71); Uganda
- Citizenship: Uganda
- Education: Makerere University (Bachelor of Arts in Social Science); University of Minnesota (Diploma in Leadership & Management; University of Nottingham (Master of Arts in Physical Planning)
- Occupations: Physical Planner & Politician
- Years active: 1980 — present
- Known for: Politics
- Title: State Minister for Trade and Member of Parliament for Bungokho County South
- Political party: National Resistance Movement

Michael Werikhe Kafabusa (born 1955), commonly known as Werikhe Kafabusa, is a Ugandan politician who currently serves as State Minister for Trade in the Cabinet of Uganda (June 2016 – present). He previously served as the State Minister for Housing from June 2006 until May 2011. In the Cabinet reshuffle of 27 May 2011, he was dropped from the cabinet, before returning as State Minister for Industry (November 2015 – June 2016). He also serves as the elected Member of Parliament representing Bungokho County South, Mbale District, having served continuously in that role since 1996.

== Background and education ==
Kafabusa was born on 25 August 1955, in Mbale District, Eastern Uganda. Kafabusa holds the degree of Bachelor of Arts in Social Science, obtained, in 1979, from Makerere University, Uganda's oldest institution of higher education, founded in 1922. In 1985, he was awarded the degree of Master of Arts in Physical Planning from the University of Nottingham, in the United Kingdom. In 1988 he received the Diploma in Leadership & Management from the University of Minnesota, in the United States. He also holds two certificates, both obtained in 1980; one in Environmental Management, from the International Institute of Technology in New Delhi, India, and the other in Environmental Information Management from the University of London.

== Career ==
Between 1980 and 1982, Kafabusa worked as a Tutorial Assistant at Makerere University. Following his Master's degree studies, he worked as the Senior Physical Planner for the Western Uganda, in the Ministry of Lands, Housing & Urban Development, from 1986 until 1987. He then returned to Makerere University and served as a Lecturer, in the Faculty of Social Sciences, from 1987 until 1988. From 1989 until 1993, he served as the Senior Physical Planner in the Ministry of Lands, Housing & Urban Development, responsible for Urban and Rural Development. From 1993 until 1995, he served as the Acting Deputy Commissioner, Department of Physical Planning in the Lands Ministry. From 1995 until 1996, he served as the Acting Commissioner, in the same ministry.

In 1996, he entered politics, and was elected to the Ugandan Parliament as Member of Parliament for Bungokho County South, Mbale District. He was re-elected for the same seat in the 2001, 2006, 2011, and 2016 General Elections.

He was appointed Minister of State for Housing in 1998. He served in that capacity until 1999 when he was appointed State Minister for Trade. In a cabinet reshuffle in 2005, he was appointed Minister of State for Energy. In June 2006, Kafabusa was appointed Minister of State for Housing, holding that position until he was dropped from the cabinet in May 2011 and replaced by Sam Engola. In 2015 he was appointed as State Minister for Industry (filling the position made vacant by the death of James Mutembe) before being shuffled back to State Minister for Trade in June 2016.

== Personal information ==
Kafabusa is married. He is a member of the National Resistance Movement political party. He enjoys African music, reading literature, physical planning and playing soccer.

== See also ==
- Parliament of Uganda
- Cabinet of Uganda
- Mbale District
