= Lydia Wanyoto =

Ugandan lawyer, politician and diplomat (born 1971)

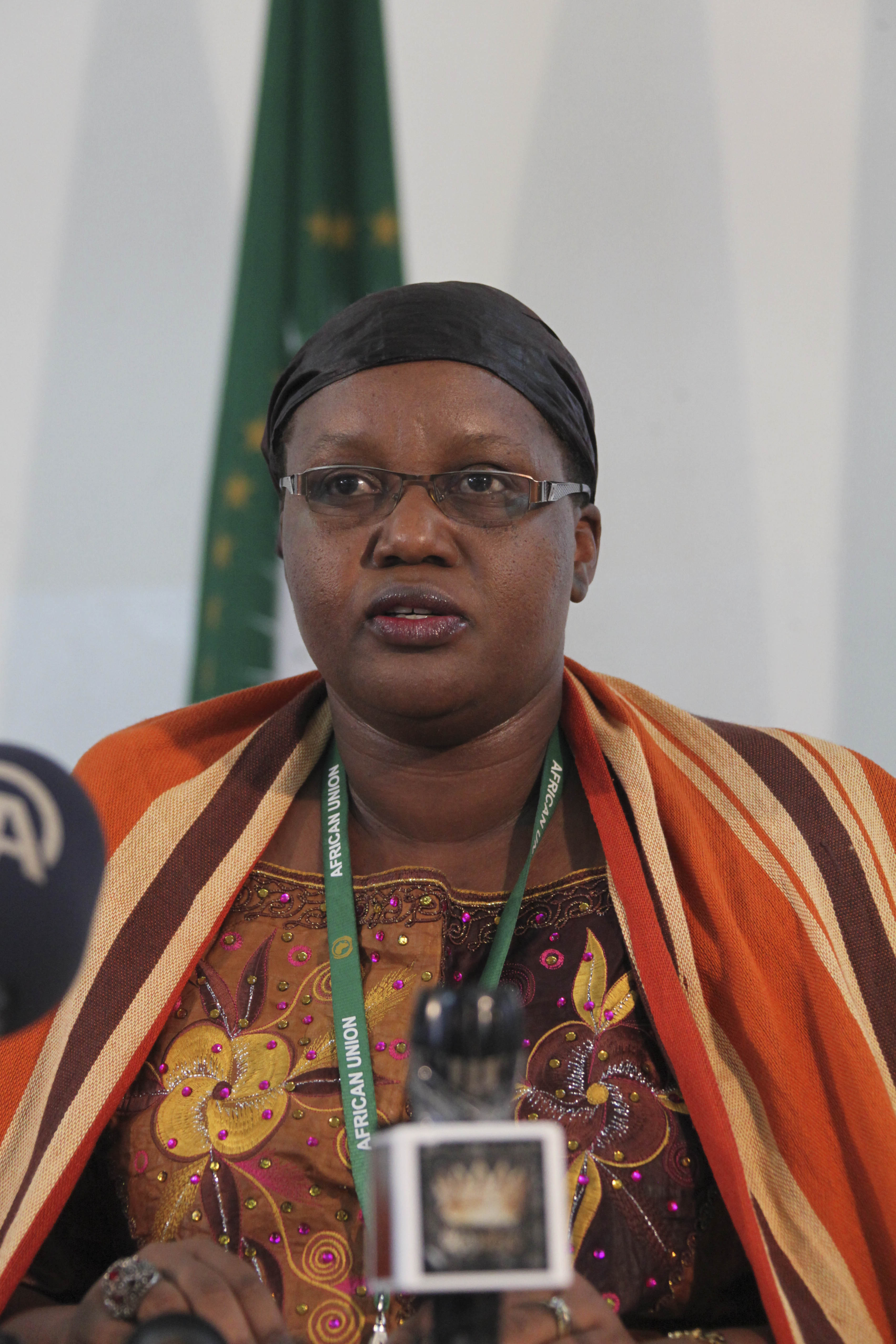
- Born: 1971 (age 54–55); Mbale, Uganda
- Education: Gayaza High School; Makerere High School; Uganda Christian University (B.Ed., LL.B.); Law Development Centre (Diploma in Legal Practice); Makerere University (M.A. Human Rights Law, M.A. Gender and Women Studies)
- Occupations: Lawyer; politician; diplomat
- Years active: 1996–present
- Title: Deputy Special Representative of the Chairperson of African Union Commission
- Spouse: James Mutende (m. 2011; died 2015)

Lydia Wanyoto Mutende (née Lydia Wanyoto), is a Ugandan lawyer, politician and diplomat, who is the Woman MP of Mbale City in the 12th parliament and serves as the Minister of State for Public Service. She served as the Deputy Special Representative of the Chairperson of African Union Commission (DSRCC), based in Addis Ababa, Ethiopia. From July 2014 until August 2014, she temporarily served as Head of the African Union Mission to Somalia.

== Early life and education ==
Wanyoto was born in Mbale, in the Eastern Region of Uganda circa 1971.

She attended Fairway Primary School, in Mbale, where she obtained her primary leaving education certificate. She transferred to Gayaza High School, in Wakiso District, where she obtained her Ordinary Level certificate (UCE). She completed high school at Makerere High School, where she obtained her High School Diploma.

She was admitted to the Uganda Christian University (UCU), where she graduated with a Bachelor of Education in Languages, specializing in English literature, English language, French language and Kiswahili. She went on to obtain a Bachelor of Laws degree, also from (UCU).

She followed that with a Diploma in Legal Practice, awarded by the Law Development Centre, in Kampala. Her first master's degree, a Master of Arts in Human Rights Law, was obtained from Makerere University, Uganda's largest and oldest public university. Her second master's degree, a Master of Arts in Gender and Women Studies, was also awarded by Makerere University.

== Career ==
In 1995, while a student at Makerere University, Wanyoto became active in campus politics and was elected as Chairperson of Marty Stuart Hall, one of the female halls of residence on campus. During the 1995 Constituent Assembly, she volunteered in the parliament chamber, helping the Assembly Chairperson with paperwork.

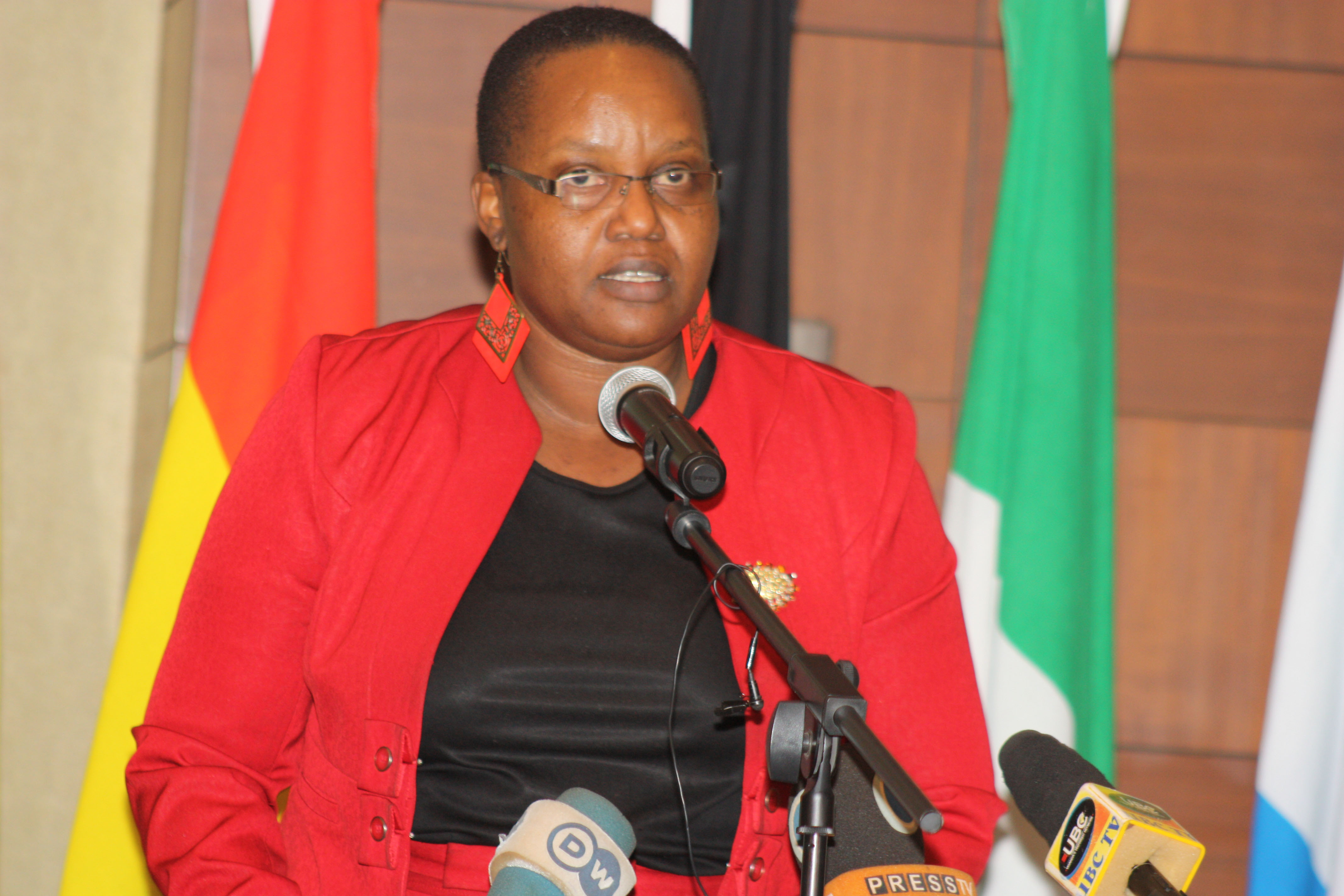
Lydia Wanyoto, Deputy Special Representative of the Chairperson African Union Commission In Somalia

In 2001, Wanyoto was elected to the first East African Legislative Assembly, because they remembered her free service during the Constituent Assembly days, despite never having served as a member of the Uganda's parliament. She served in that role from 4 February 2001 until 10 February 2006.

Wanyoto is currently the Woman MP of Mbale City in the 12th parliament where she doubles as the Minister of State for Public Service. Before her appointment in the ministerial post, she expressed her interest in running for the Speakership race.

== Personal life ==
Lydia Wanyoto was married to the late James Shinyabulo Mutende (26 February 1962 – 2 October 2015), the former State Minister of Industry from 27 May 2011 until 2 October 2015.

== Other considerations ==
Lydia Wanyoto is a member of the board of directors of Advocates Coalition for Development and Environment (ACODE), a Kampala-based think tank. She is also a member of the committee that was created to establish the National Defence College, Uganda.

In April 2019, Wanyoto was appointed to the board of directors of the National Planning Authority of Uganda, to serve a five-year term, renewable one time.
