= Busitema University Faculty of Health Sciences =

Public medical school in Uganda

Coordinates: 01°04′55″N 34°10′35″E

Busitema University Faculty of Health Sciences (BUFHS)
- Type: Public
- Established: 2013; 13 years ago
- Affiliations: Busitema University
- Dean: Julius Wandabwa
- Location: Pallisa Road, Mbale, Uganda
- Campus: Urban
- Website: www.bufhs.ac.ug

The Busitema University Faculty of Health Sciences (BUFHS), also known as the Busitema University Medical School (BUMS) and the Busitema University School of Medicine (BUSM), is the school of medicine of Busitema University, one of Uganda's public universities. The medical school is one of the newer medical schools in the country, having been part of university since 2013. The school provides medical education at undergraduate and postgraduate levels.

== Location ==
The school's campus is on the premises of the Mbale Regional Referral Hospital on Pallisa Road in the central business district of the city of Mbale, in Uganda's Eastern Region. The campus is approximately 221 kilometres (137 mi), by road, north-east of Kampala, Uganda's capital and largest city. The coordinates of the school are 1°04'55.0"N, 34°10'35.0"E (Latitude:1.081944; Longitude:34.176389).

== Overview ==
The school constitutes the Faculty of Health Sciences at Busitema University. The faculty is headed by Dean Professor Julius Wandabwa, who is deputized by Dr. Joseph Mpagi Luwaga. The teaching disciplines of the medical school are integrated with the regional referral hospital. The hospital's consultants, registrars, and interns collaborate in teaching the university's medical and nursing students.

== Undergraduate Programmes ==
The following undergraduate programmes are offered:

- 1. Bachelor of Medicine and Bachelor of Surgery (MBChB)

The degree is awarded after three years of pre-clinical instruction and examination in anatomy, physiology, biochemistry, microbiology, pathology, and pharmacology, followed by two years of clinical instruction and examination in general surgery, internal medicine, pediatrics, obstetrics & gynecology, psychiatry, otolaryngology, neurosurgery, orthopedics, anesthesiology, urology, and public health.

- 2. Bachelor of Science in Nursing (BNS)

The degree is awarded after four years of instruction and examination.

- 3. Bachelor of Science in Anaesthesia

The degree is awarded after four years of instruction and examination.

== Postgraduate Programmes ==
The following postgraduate programmes are offered:

- 1. Master of Medicine in Internal Medicine (MMed in Medicine)
- 2. Master of Public Health (MPH)
- 3. Master of Medicine in Pediatrics and Child Health (MMed in Pediatrics)

== Planned programmes ==
As of November 2016, the following academic programmes were being planned.

- 1. Bachelor of Clinical Medicine & Community Health
- 2. Bachelor of Pharmacy
- 3. Master of Medicine in Surgery
- 4. Master of Medicine in Obstetrics and Gynecology.

== See also ==
- Education in Uganda
- List of medical schools in Uganda
- List of hospitals in Uganda
