= Soroti University =

Public university in Uganda

Soroti University (SUN)
- Type: Public University
- Established: June 23, 2015; 11 years ago
- Chancellor: Professor Francis Omaswa
- Vice-Chancellor: Prof. Robert Ikoja-Odongo
- Location: Soroti, Uganda; 01°45′56″N 33°37′44″E
- Campus: Urban
- Website: www.sun.ac.ug
- Location within Uganda

Soroti University (SUN), is a public multi-campus university in Uganda. It is one of the public universities and degree-awarding institutions in the country.

== Location ==
Soroti University has its main campus in Arapai, Arapai sub-county, Soroti District, approximately 8 kilometres (5.0 mi), by road, northeast of the central business district of the city of Soroti, on the Soroti–Amuria Road. This is approximately 296 kilometres (184 mi), by road, northeast of Kampala, Uganda's capital and largest city. The campus sits on 200 acres (81 ha) of land, near the campus of Teso College, a boys-only, boarding middle (S1-S4) and high school (S5-S6). The coordinates of the campus of Soroti University are 1°45'56.0"N, 33°3'44.0"E (Latitude:1.765543; Longitude:33.628900).

== History ==
The government of Uganda, following lobbying by stakeholders from the Teso sub-region, decided in 2012 to establish a public university in Soroti District. A five-person task-force, headed by founding Vice chancellor Robert Ikoja-Odongo, was named by the Uganda minister of education in September 2012 to prepare for the opening of the university. Soroti University was expected to open in August 2013. In that month, however, the Daily Monitor, a Ugandan daily newspaper, revealed that members charged with the establishment of the public Soroti University had also been establishing Teso University, a private institution.

Construction of the university's main building began in June 2014 with completion expected 24 months later. In June 2015, the government of Uganda, officially created Soroti University as a public institution, when the minister of Education, Science and Technology and Sports, Jessica Alupo, introduced a Statutory Instrument followed by a resolution of Parliament to the same effect.On April 9, 2026, the Uganda Registration Services Bureau officially launched its 40th national Technology and Innovation Support Centre at the university campus to assist student research.

== Campus Expansion ==
In September 2024, the university administration signed a 14.3 billion Shilling contract with the National Enterprise Corporation (NEC) to complete the phase-two construction of the campus anatomy block.

== Centre for Nuclear Science and Technology (CNST) ==
In 2023, Soroti University was selected by the Ministry of Energy and Mineral Development (MEMD) from among nine public universities in Uganda to host the National Centre for Nuclear Science and Technology (CNST). The university subsequently signed a Memorandum of Understanding (MoU) with the MEMD to institutionalize the partnership.

To implement the center, the university allocated 45 acres (20 hectares) of campus land. The project layout reserves 22 acres for the core nuclear research facility and training complex, while the remaining 23 acres are earmarked for supporting infrastructure, including student hostels and a hotel facility for visiting international experts.

The center will feature Uganda’s first nuclear research reactor, whose primary objectives include:

- Education and Training
- Healthcare
- Agriculture and Industry

In January 2025, a joint working group was established to oversee the center's phased development. The university has since embarked on developing specialized academic curricula for undergraduate, postgraduate, and diploma programs in nuclear science and technology, drawing benchmarks from international nuclear training frameworks in South Korea, Russia, China, and the United Kingdom.

== Schools and Academic programs ==
As of June 2026, the university maintained the following schools and institutions:

- School of Health Sciences
- School of Engineering and Technology
- School of Applied Science & Science Education

The University Senate officially approved several new academic programs to be forwarded to the National Council for Higher Education (NCHE) for final evaluation and accreditation.

School Leadership

School of Health Sciences-Assoc. Prof. Samuel Kabwigu, Dean

School of Engineering and Technology-Dr. Excellence Favor, Deputy Dean

School of Applied Science and Science Education-Dr. Robert Entengu Oguti, Ag Dean

== Administration ==
In August 2022, Professor Francis Omaswa was officially installed as the first chancellor of Soroti University.The university's daily operations are overseen by the Vice Chancellor, Professor Robert Ikoja-Odongo, assisted by the Deputy Vice-Chancellor Lawrence Too-Okema, both serving alongside the Chancellor, Prof. Omaswa. Omaswa's official installation ceremony was presided over by Uganda's Vice President, Jessica Alupo.In July 2026, the university appointed 76 new senior academic and administrative staff members to strengthen its research and leadership capacity, which included appointing renowned pharmacologist Prof. Patrick Engeu Ogwang as the Head of the Department of Pharmacology.

== Academic courses ==
The following academic courses are on offer:

- Bachelor of Medicine and Bachelor of Surgery
- Bachelor of Nursing Science
- Bachelor of Science in Physiotherapy
- Bachelor of Medical Laboratory Sciences
- Bachelor of Engineering in Electronic & Computer Engineering
- Bachelor of Engineering in Electrical & Electronics Engineering
- Bachelor of Science in Accounting, Finance, and Computing
- Higher Education Access Certificate (HEAC)

== Achievements ==
On December 13, 2025, Soroti University marked a historic milestone by hosting its maiden graduation ceremony at the main campus pavilion. Presided over by Vice President Jessica Alupo on behalf of President Yoweri Museveni, the university conferred degrees upon its pioneer cohort of 118 students. The graduating class included 53 students with a Bachelor of Medicine and Bachelor of Surgery, 43 with a Bachelor of Nursing Sciences, and 22 with a Bachelor of Engineering in Computer and Electronics Engineering. In March 2025, Soroti University's medical school achieved nationwide academic recognition by winning the Uganda National Medical Quiz. Scoring 95 points, the host team defeated runner-up Islamic University in Uganda (IUIU) and defending champions Makerere University to secure top honors.The university secured international honors at the World Mobile Congress (WMC) in Shanghai, China, by winning the Best Operator Institution Category Award. The recognition was awarded for the institution's exceptional execution of the LEAP digital skills development framework. In March 2026, the university's student innovation group, "Team SunTech," won the Agriculture Category at the national Industry 4.0+ Hackathon. The competition was held alongside Uganda's Sovereign Cloud Launch and evaluated over 400 nationwide innovation applications. Soroti University students finished as the 1st Runners-Up at the Inter-University Innovation Challenge during Mbarara University's Innovation Week. The team was awarded for their development of "Mindset," an Android-based mobile application addressing digital health intervention and community mental wellness gaps.

Student Hostels

- Alalo Hostel
- Crown Hostel
- Deluxe Hostel
- Asak Hostel
- Camp Charles Hostel
- Prime Hostel
- Executive Hostel
- Abby Appartment Hostel
- Hostel Blue Sky
- Akiror Hostel

== See also ==
- Education in Uganda
- List of universities in Uganda
- Eastern Region, Uganda
- List of university leaders in Uganda
