= Sam Engola =

Ugandan businessman and politician

- Born: 15 June 1958 (age 68); Uganda
- Citizenship: Uganda
- Education: London School of Business and Management
- Occupations: Businessman & politician
- Years active: 1990–Present
- Known for: Politics
- Spouse: Mrs Betty Engola

Sam Engola (June 15, 1958) is a Ugandan businessman and politician. Engola was appointed on the 26th May 2026 as Minister for Disaster Preparedness and Refugees in the Office of the Prime Minister by President Yoweri Kaguta Museveni. Before that, he was the Senior Presidential Advisor from 2022 to 2026.

He also served as a member of the Central Executive Committee of NRM representing Northern Uganda, between 2010 and 2020.

Hon Sam Engola previously served as State Minister for Housing in the Cabinet of Uganda between 2011 and 2016. He was appointed to that position on 27 May 2011. He was appointed Cabinet Minister for Relief, Disaster Preparedness and Refugees in the twelfth Parliament of Uganda.

Apart from politics, Engola is the Awitong, or Clan Leader of Otikokin, a role he has held for many years due to his knowledge of cultural matters and generosity.

He is also the elected Member of Parliament for Erute County South in Lira District.

He replaced Michael Werikhe Kafabusa, who was dropped from the Cabinet. In the cabinet reshuffle of 1 March 2015, he retained his cabinet portfolio. Sam Engola is also the elected Member of Parliament for "Erute County South", Lira District.

== Background and education ==
He was born in Lira District on 15 June 1958. After attending local schools, he studied at the Institute of Shipping and Management Studies, obtaining the Diploma in Clearing & Forwarding, prior to 1996. In 1996, he was awarded the Diploma in Management & Administration from an undisclosed institution. In 2008, he obtained the Certificate in Leadership & Public Speaking from the London School of Business and Management.

== Career ==
From 1995 until 1996, he served as a member of the Constitutional Assembly that drafted and promulgated the 1995 Ugandan Constitution. He served as the Chairman of Uganda Air Cargo Limited from 1995 until 2001. He has continuously represented his constituency in the Ugandan Parliament since 2001. He has business interests in the hotel and tourism industry, dating back to 1990. He is also a member of the National Executive Committee of the ruling National Resistance Movement political party.

== See also ==
- Daudi Migereko
- Aidah Nantaba
- Ugandan Cabinet
- Ugandan Parliament
- Lira
- Ugandan Government
