= Soroti University School of Medicine and Health Sciences =

Medical and Health Science school in Uganda

Soroti University School of Medicine and Health Sciences (SUSMHS)
- Type: Public
- Established: 2015
- Affiliations: Soroti University
- Students: 70 (2017)
- Location: Soroti, Uganda; 01°42′57″N 33°36′47″E
- Campus: Urban

Soroti University School of Medicine and Health Sciences (SUSMHS), is one of the three schools of Soroti University, one of Uganda's public universities. The school houses the university's medical school, the fifth public medical school in the country.

== Location ==
The school's campus is on the premises of Soroti Regional Referral Hospital, in the central business district of the city of Soroti in Soroti District, Eastern Region. This campus is approximately 290 kilometres (180 mi), by road, northeast of Kampala, Uganda's capital and largest city. The coordinates of the school are 1°42'57.0"N, 33°36'50.0"E (Latitude:1.715833; Longitude:33.613889).

== Overview ==
The school, whose official name is Soroti University School of Medicine and Health Sciences (SUSMHS), is organised in over 20 distinct departments, each led by a departmental head. The areas of study include human medicine, nursing, dentistry, biomedical science, pharmacy, and allied health professionals. The objectives of the school include the training of competent health professionals, who will provide the required health care and relieve the disease and morbidity burden in the region and the country.

== Undergraduate courses ==
The following undergraduate courses are offered:

- Bachelor of Medicine and Bachelor of Surgery
- Bachelor of Science in Biomedical Science
- Bachelor of Science in Nursing Science
- Bachelor of Science in Biomedical Laboratory Technology
- Bachelor of Science in Biomedical Engineering
- Bachelor of Dentistry
- Bachelor of Pharmacy
- Diploma in Pharmacy.

== See also ==
- Medical Schools
- Uganda Medical Schools
- Uganda Hospitals
