= Mbale Hospital =

Mbale Regional Referral Hospital
- Uganda Ministry of Health
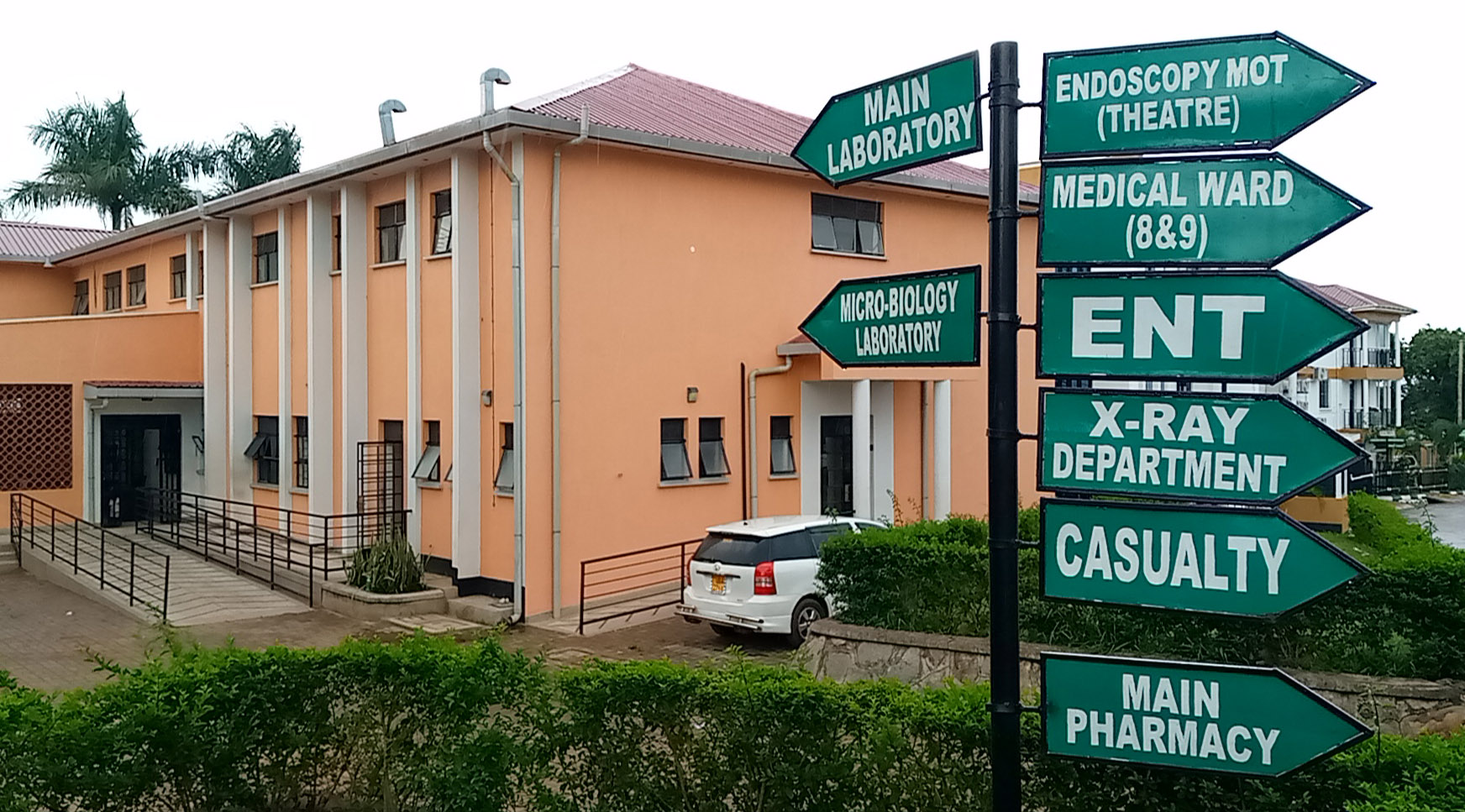
- Mbale hospital

- Location within Uganda

Geography
- Location: Mbale, Mbale District, Eastern Region, Uganda
- Coordinates: 01°04′36″N 34°10′35″E

Organisation
- Care system: Public
- Type: General and Teaching

Services
- Emergency department: I
- Beds: 400

History
- Founded: 1924

Links
- Other links: Hospitals in Uganda; Medical education in Uganda; Busitema University Medical School

Mbale Regional Referral Hospital, commonly known as Mbale Hospital is a hospital in Mbale, Eastern Uganda. It is the referral hospital for the districts of Busia, Budaka, Kibuku, Kapchorwa, Bukwa, Butaleja, Manafwa, Mbale, Pallisa, Sironko and Tororo. The hospital also serves many more patients from outside the hospital's catchment area.

== Location ==
Mbale Hospital is located on Pallisa Road, in the central business district of the city of Mbale, approximately 102 kilometres (63 mi), by road, southeast of Soroti Regional Referral Hospital, in the city of Soroti. This is about 144 kilometres (89 mi), by road, northeast of Jinja Regional Referral Hospital, in the city of Jinja.

Mbale Regional Referral Hospital is located approximately 227 kilometres (141 mi), by road, northeast of Mulago National Referral Hospital, in Kampala, Uganda's capital city. The coordinates of Mbale Regional Referral Hospital are: 01°04'36.0"N, 34°10'35.0"E (Latitude:1.076667; Longitude:34.176389).

== Overview ==
Mbale Hospital is a public hospital, funded by the Uganda Ministry of Health and general care in the hospital is free. The hospital is one of the thirteen "Regional Referral Hospitals" in Uganda. It is also designated as one of the three public clinical paramedical teaching hospitals and as one of the fifteen "Internship Hospitals" in Uganda, where graduates of Ugandan medical schools can serve a one-year internship under the supervision of qualified specialists and consultants. The hospital is the teaching hospital of Busitema University School of Medicine.

== See also ==
- UG Medical Schools
- Busitema University
- Uganda Hospitals
