= Mbale District =

- District
- District location in Uganda
- Coordinates: 1°01′N 34°11′E
- Country: Uganda
- Region: Eastern Uganda
- Sub-region: Bugisu sub-region
- Capital: Mbale

Area
  - Land: 518.8 km^{2} (200.3 sq mi)

Population (2012 Estimate)
  - Total: 441,300
  - Density: 850.6/km^{2} (2,203/sq mi)
- Time zone: UTC+3 (EAT)
- Website: www.mbale.go.ug

Mbale District is a district in Eastern Uganda. It is named after the largest city in the district, Mbale, which also serves as the main administrative and commercial center in the sub-region.

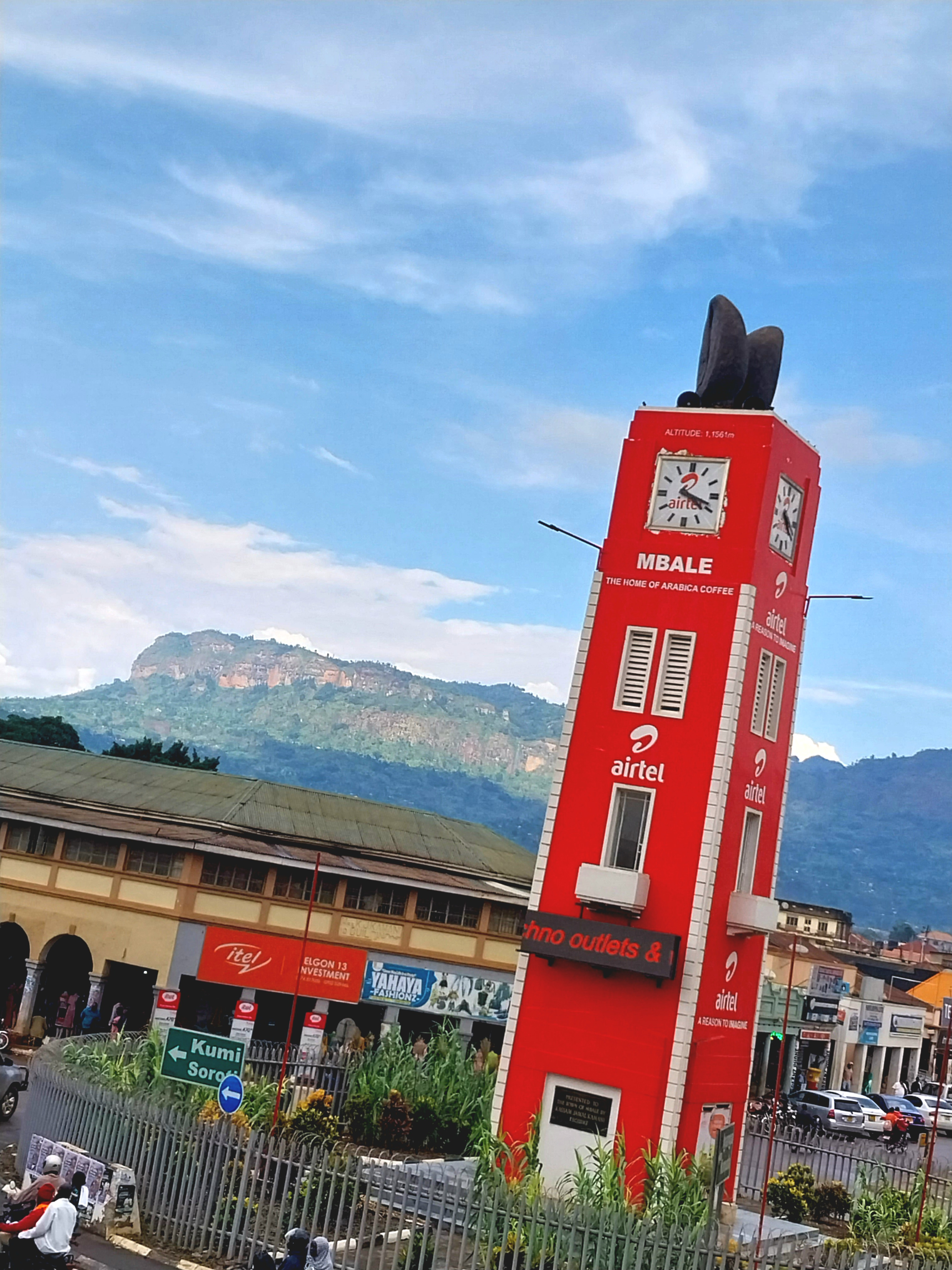
Mbale city center

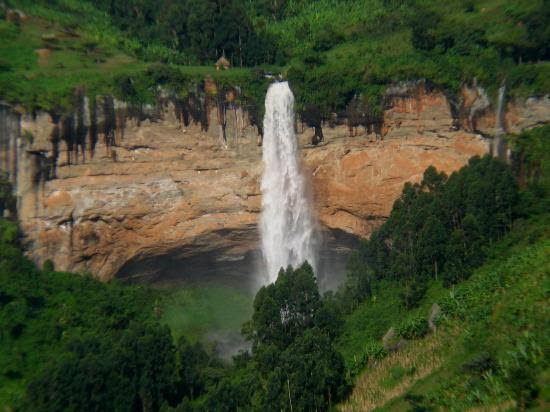
Wanale hill water falls in Mbale district

== Location ==
Mbale District is bordered by Sironko District to the north, Bududa District to the northeast, Manafwa District to the southeast, Tororo District to the south, Butaleja District to the southwest and Budaka District to the west. Pallisa District and Kumi District lie to the northwest of Mbale District. Mbale, the largest town in the district which serves as the district headquarters, is located approximately 245 kilometres (152 mi) northeast of Kampala, the capital and largest city of Uganda. The coordinates of the district are:00 57N, 34 20E. It has an area of 518.8 square kilometres (200.3 mi^{2}). The districts of Bududa, Manafwa and Sironko were part of Mbale District before they were split off as independent districts.

== Population ==
The 1991 census estimated the district population at about 240,900. The 2002 national census put the population in the district at 332,600, with an annual population growth rate of 2.5%. In 2012, the mid-year population of Mbale District was estimated at 441,300. The current population (2024), according to the citizen report is estimated to be around 586,300. The district population is 92% rural. The main ethnic group in the district are the Bamasaba or Bagisu. The main language spoken in the district is Lugisu also known as Lumasaba.

Mbale is made up of two counties and several subcounties and parishes as its administrative divisions.

=== Bungokho central county. ===
Below is a list of sub counties and their parishes.

1. Bumbobi - Bufuya, Bkhumwa, Bumbobi, and Busambe parish.
2. Bungokho - Bubirabi, Bumageni, Bushikori, Khamoto, and Lwambogo parish.
3. Busano - Bufooto, Busano, Buyaka, and bwikhonje parish.
4. Busoba - Bumasikye, Bunambutye, Bunanimi, Busoba parish.
5. Nabumali town council - Bukuwa ward, Masikye ward, Mungoma ward, Nabumali central ward, southern ward and wamwa ward.
6. Nyondo - Bubetsye, Bufukhula, Nabumali, and lastly Nyondo parish.

=== Bungokho county. ===
Below is a list of sub counties and their respective parishes.

1. Bubyangu - Bubyangu, Bukikoso, Bumadanda, Bunabigubo, Bunabuloli, Bunamoli, Bunawozi, Kirayi, Lusamenta, and Madege parish.
2. Budwale - Budwale, Bukingala, Bunamahe, and buwanagadi.
3. Bufumbo - Bukobe, Bumagira, Bunamajje, Buzalangizo, and Kama.
4. Bukhiende - Bugwanyi, Bumaena, Bumutsopa, Bunashimolo, Burukuru, Bushangi, and Isando.
5. Bumasikye - Lubaale, Lwaboba, muanda and Toma parish.
6. Bunambutye - Bunambutye, Lwaboba, Makunda, and Musese.
7. Busiu - Bufukhula, Bulusambu, Buwalasi, and Lumbuku.
8. Busiu town council - Alpha ward, Bufukhula central ward, Bufukhula ward, Buwalasi ward, Central ward, Hospital ward, Kolan wardMabanga ward, Namirembe ward and Town ward.
9. Jewa town council - Jewa ward, Kitagalu ward, Nakyanikile ward, Nalumoya ward, and Ndoko ward.
10. Lukhonge - Naweya, Namawanga, Nambwa and Waninda parish.
11. Wanale - Bubentsye, Bunatsoma, Bushiuyo, Khaukha, and Nbanyolw parish

== Economic activity ==
The primary economic activity in the district is agriculture. Some of the main crops are coffee, beans, matooke, maize, onions, potatoes, carrots, and sweet potatoes.

== Education ==
As of May 2014 there are several university campuses in Mbale, including the following:

- The Islamic University in Uganda, which was established in 1988, maintains its main campus here.
- The Uganda Christian University, with its main campus in Mukono, established its Mbale campus in 2003.
- LivingStone International University, was established in 2012 and has its main campus in Mbale as well.
- Uganda Martyrs University, with its main campus in Nkozi, established its Mbale campus in 2009.

Other institutions of learning include Mbale Secondary School, a mixed day middle and high school (grades 8 to 13), with about 4,000 students. The high school graduates about 250 students in mathematics and sciences, making it one of major science schools in Eastern Uganda. Bungokho Rural Development Centre offers vocational training and is located 3 miles (4.8 km), by road, outside of the town centre, opposite Bumageni Army Military Barracks which has Bumageni Army Children's Primary School.

== Twinning ==
Mbale was formally linked with the town Pontypridd, Wales through local and regional twinning ceremonies in 2005. The link was intended to associate professionals and organizations in Pontypridd with their counterparts in Africa, under the auspices of charity Partnerships Overseas Networking Trust.

== Notable people ==
- Werikhe Kafabusa - Uganda's State Minister for Housing, 2006–2011.
- Lydia Wanyoto - Ugandan Lawyer, Politician and Diplomat.
- Lanie Banks - Canadian, Ugandan Rapper, Songwriter and Community Activist.
- James Wapakhabulo - Ugandan Lawyer and Politician.
- Nathan Nandala Mafabi - Ugandan Accountant, Lawyer and Politician.
- John Wasikye - Ugandan Anglican Bishop.

== Economic Acrivity ==
- Maize
- Matooke
- Beans
- Communication
- Irish potatoes

== Livestock kept ==
- Cattle
- Chicken

== See also ==
- IUIU
- Mbale Secondary School
- Nabumali High
- Bugisu sub-region
- Eastern Uganda
- Districts of Uganda
