= Mbale =

- Location in Uganda
- Coordinates: 01°04′50″N 34°10′30″E
- Country: Uganda
- Regions: Eastern Uganda
- Subregion: Bugisu sub-region

Government
  - Mayor: Joyce Kidulu Matuka
- Elevation: 1,156 m (3,793 ft)

Population (2024 Census)
  - Total: 290,414

Mbale is a city in the Eastern Region of Uganda. It is the main municipal, administrative commercial center of Mbale District and the surrounding sub-region.

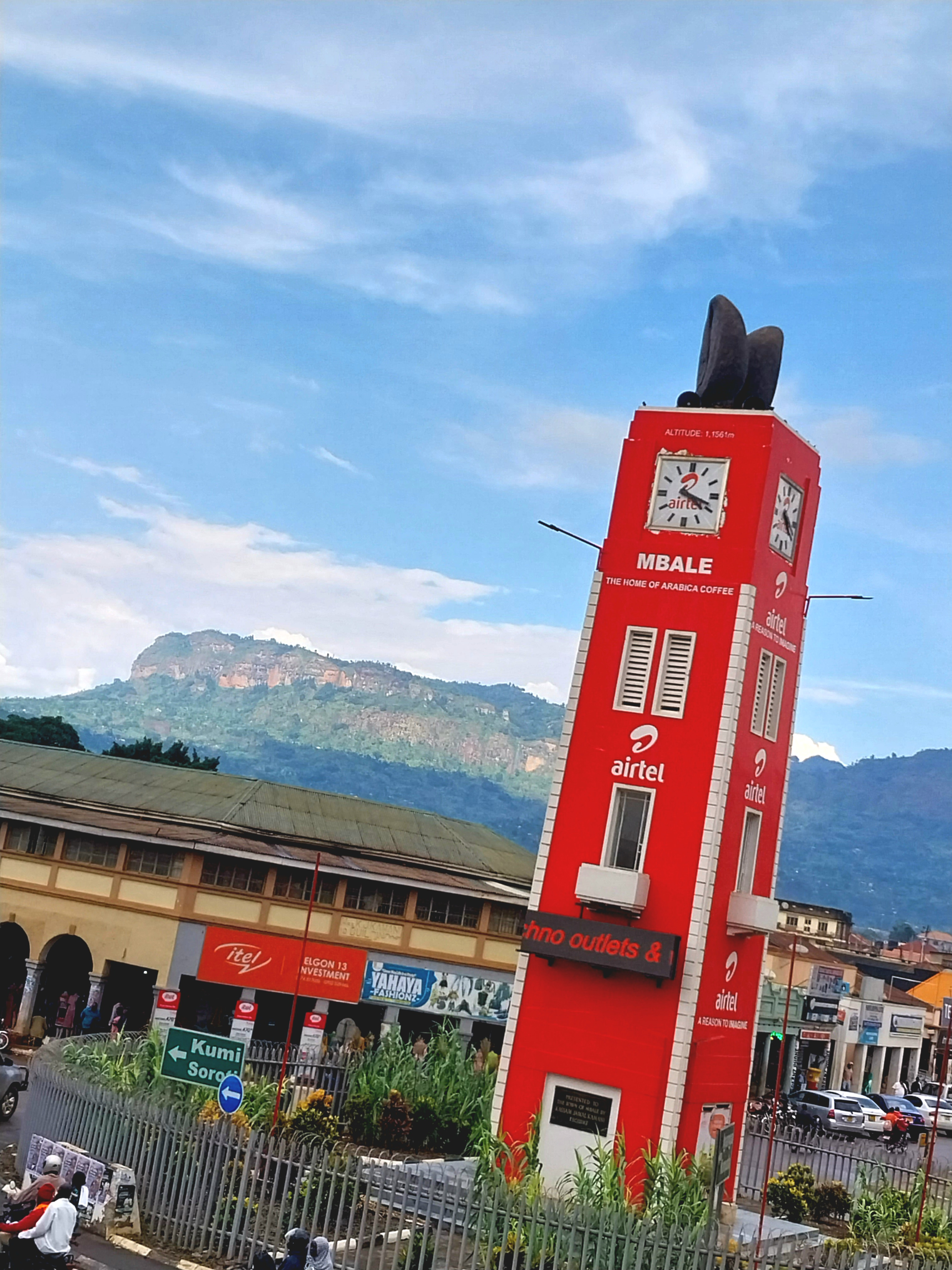
Mbale city center.

== Location ==
Mbale is approximately 225 kilometres (140 mi) northeast of Kampala, Uganda's capital city, on an all-weather tarmac highway. The city lies at an average elevation of 1,156 metres (3,793 ft) above sea level.

The coordinates of the city are 1°04'50.0"N, 34°10'30.0"E (Latitude:1.080556; Longitude:34.175000). The city is on the railway from Tororo to Pakwach. Mount Elgon, one of the highest peaks in East Africa, is approximately 48 kilometres (30 mi), north-east of Mbale, by road.

Mbale City is found in the Bugisu sub-region and is administratively divided into two divisions: Industrial Division and Northern Division.

=== Industrial Division ===
The industrial Division has one sub-county called Industrial Division and it has a number of parishes which include:

1. Boma ward
2. Bukasakya ward
3. Bumboi ward
4. Bumutoto ward
5. Busamaga East ward
6. Busamaga West ward
7. Doko ward
8. Kijja ward
9. Malukhu ward
10. Malare ward
11. Masaba ward
12. Mooni-nambale ward
13. Mooni-wanale ward
14. Mukhubu ward
15. Muyanda ward
16. Nabitiri ward
17. Namalogo ward
18. Namatala ward
19. Napooli central ward
20. Napooli lower ward
21. Napooli upper ward
22. South Central ward
23. Tsabanyanya ward
24. Wakhwaba central ward
25. Wakhwaba lower ward
26. Wakhwaba upper ward

=== Northern Division ===
The Northern division also has one sub-county namely Northern division and its parish includes:

1. Afya ward
2. Aisa ward
3. Bukikali
4. Bulweta
5. Bumuluya
6. Bumuyanga
7. Buwangolo
8. Bwana ward
9. Doko ward
10. Fika Salama ward
11. IU-IU ward
12. Kihuno ward
13. Kireka Nakaloke SC ward
14. Kireka Nakaloke TC ward
15. Kolonyi ward
16. Lwasso
17. Mukunja ward
18. Nabuyonga ward
19. Nabweya ward
20. Najja ward
21. Nakaloke ward
22. Namabasa ward
23. Namagumba ward
24. Namakwekwe ward
25. Nambulu/Kasanja ward
26. Namunsi ward
27. Nanyunza
28. Nkoma-Namanyonyi ward
29. Nkoma-Northern ward
30. North Central ward
31. Rock ward
32. Salem Ward

== Population ==
According to the 2002 census, the population of Mbale was about 71,130. In 2010, the Uganda Bureau of Statistics (UBOS) estimated the population at 81,900. In 2011, UBOS estimated the mid-year population at 91,800. The 2014 population census put the population at 96,189.

Historical population
Year	Pop.	±%
2002	71,130	—
2010	81,900	+15.1%
2011	91,800	+12.1%
2014	96,189	+4.8%

== Twinning ==
Mbale was formally linked with the town of Pontypridd, Wales through local and regional twinning ceremonies in 2005. The link was intended to associate professionals and organizations in Pontypridd with their counterparts in Africa, under the auspices of the charity known as the Partnerships Overseas Networking Trust.

== Points of interest ==
The following points of interest lie within the city limits or close to its borders:

=== Administrative ===
- The headquarters of Mbale District Administration
- The offices of Mbale City Council

=== Public facilities ===
- Mbale central market
- Mbale Municipal Stadium

=== Military ===
- The headquarters of the 3rd Division of the Uganda People's Defense Force

=== Health facilities ===
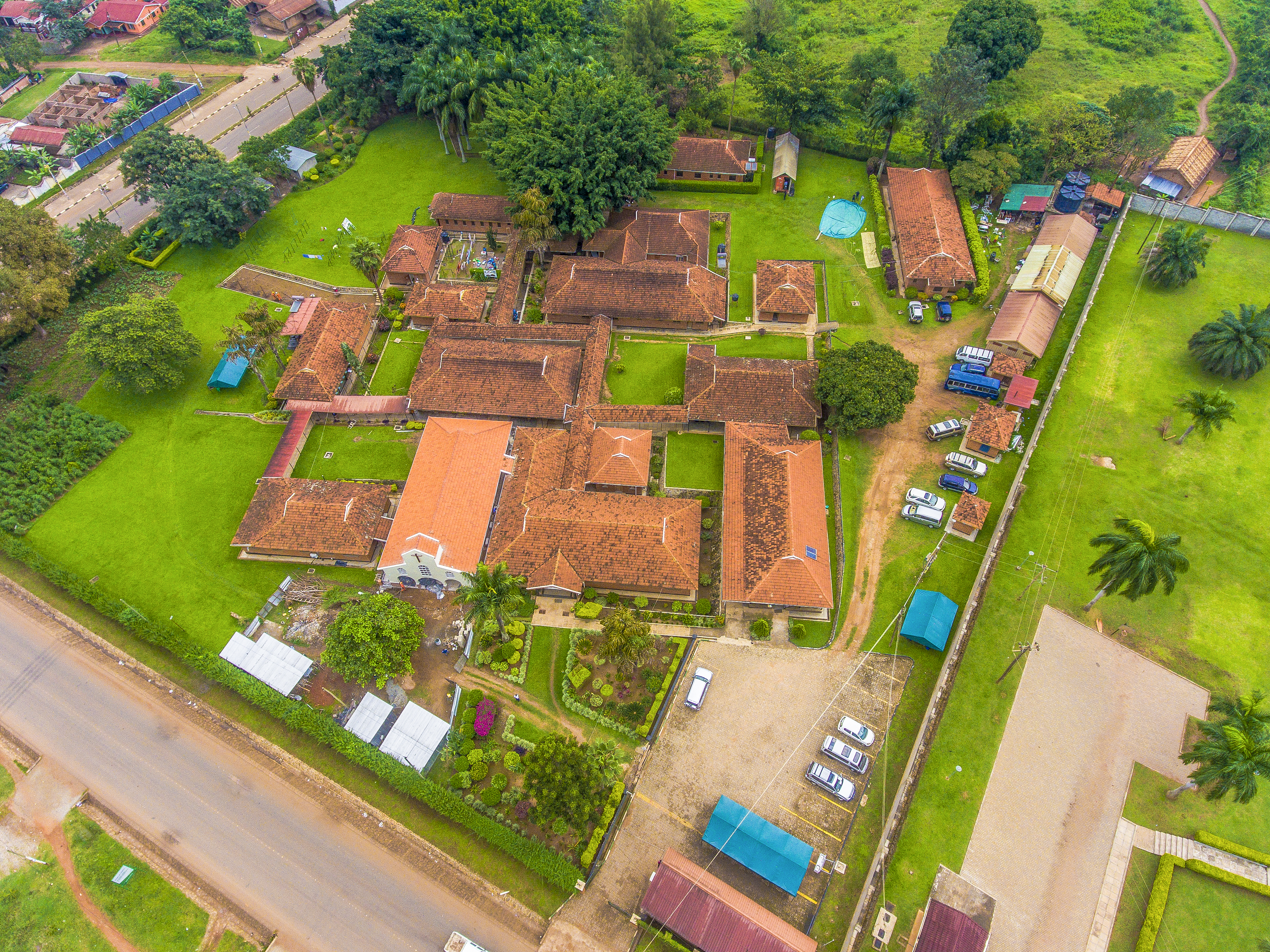
Cure Children's Hospital, Mbale

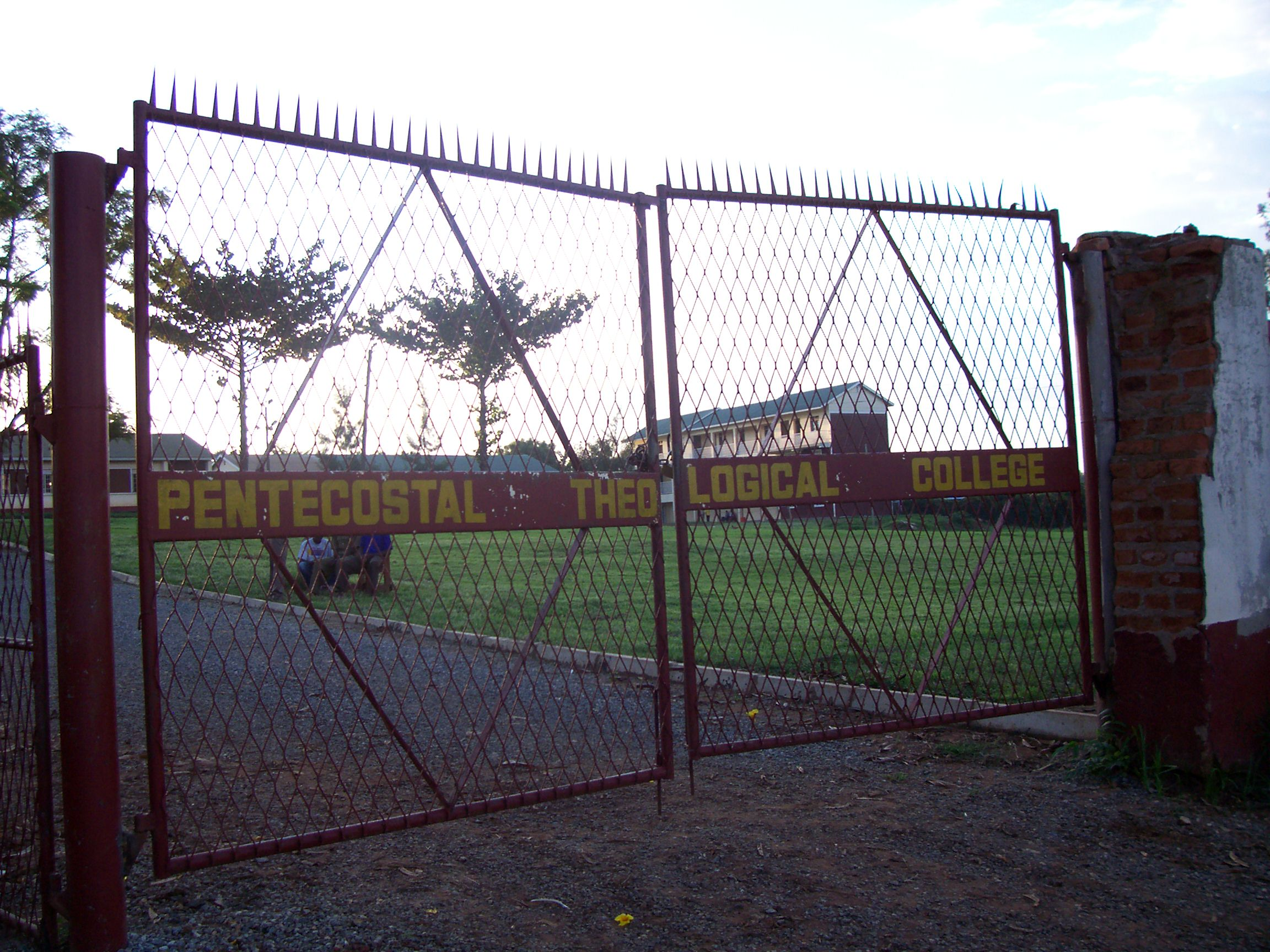
Mbale Pentecostal Theological College

- Mbale Regional Referral Hospital - a 400-bed public hospital administered by the Uganda Ministry of Health
- CURE Children's Hospital of Uganda

=== Educational institutions ===
- Uganda Christian University College - Headquartered at Mukono UCU, formerly Bishop Tucker Theological College
- Busitema University Faculty of Health Sciences - the medical school of Busitema University, a public institution of higher education
- The main campus of the Islamic University in Uganda
- The Mbale Campus of Uganda Martyrs University - a private university, whose headquarters are located in Nkozi, Mpigi District
- LivingStone International University - a private university affiliated with the fellowship of Christian Churches and Churches of Christ
- Mbale School of Clinical Officers

== City status ==
In 2019 the Cabinet of Uganda, resolved to award Mbale, city status effective July 2021. In November of the same year, Cabinet revised the date of city status to 1 July 2020.

== Notable people ==
- Semei Kakungulu: a General from Kooki, who established Mbale Town in 1903
- John Wasikye: Anglican Bishop, was Murdered After Liberation of Kampala, April 11, 1979
- James Wapakhabulo (Wapa): Politician, Chairman of the Constituent assembly (1994-1995), Speaker of Ugandan Parliament (1996-1998)
- Lydia Wanyoto: Lawyer, politician and diplomat. Mbale City Woman Member of Parliament, (2026-2031)
- Nathan Nandala Mafabi: Ugandan accountant, lawyer, and politician. He represents Budadiri County West in Sironko District in the Parliament of Uganda. From May 2011 until January 2014, he was the leader of the opposition.
- Walter de Sousa Field Hockey player for Indian hockey team. He was born in Mbale, Uganda and spent his early childhood here where his father was working under the colonial administration.
- Dani Wadada Nabudere (15 December 1932 – 9 November 2011) was a Ugandan academic, Pan-Africanist, lawyer, politician, author, political scientist, and development specialist.
- Gershom Sizomu: First chief rabbi of Uganda, from the Abayudaya community. Member of the Ugandan Parliament for the Bungokho North constituency (10th Parliament running from 2016-2021)
- Lanie Banks: Canadian-Ugandan rapper, songwriter and community activist.
- Werike Kafabusa: Ugandan politician.

== See also ==
- Gisu people
- Gisu language
- Mbale Kenya
- Railway stations in Uganda
- Bugisu Co-operative Union Limited
- List of cities and towns in Uganda
