= Kasese Municipal Health Centre III =

- Kasese District Department of Public Health
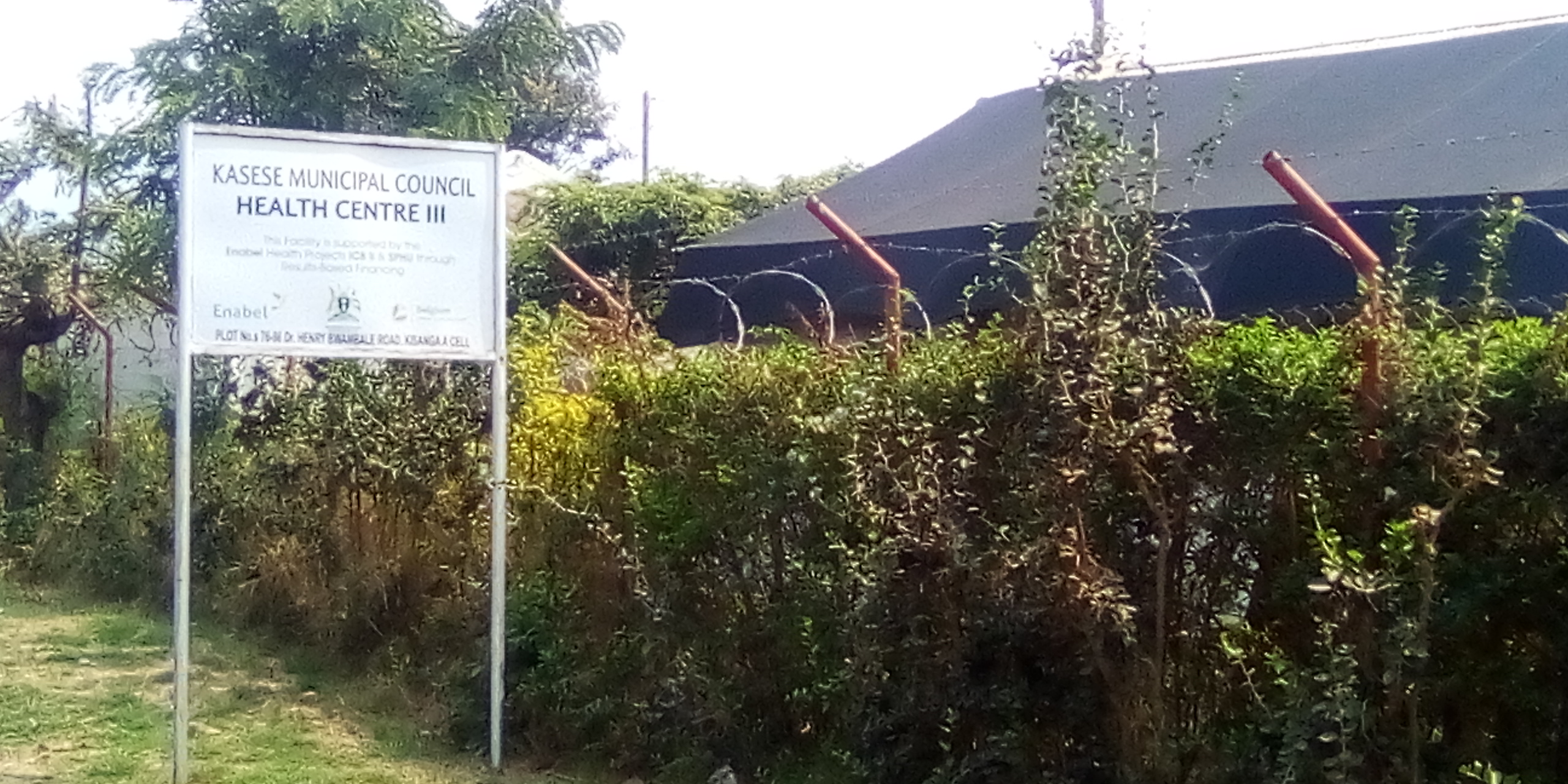

Geography
- Location: Kilembe road, Kasese Municipality,Kasese District Western Region, Uganda
- Coordinates: 0.207941°N 30.107571°E

Organisation
- Type: General

Links
- Website: demo.kasese.go.ug/departments/health
- Lists: Hospitals in Uganda

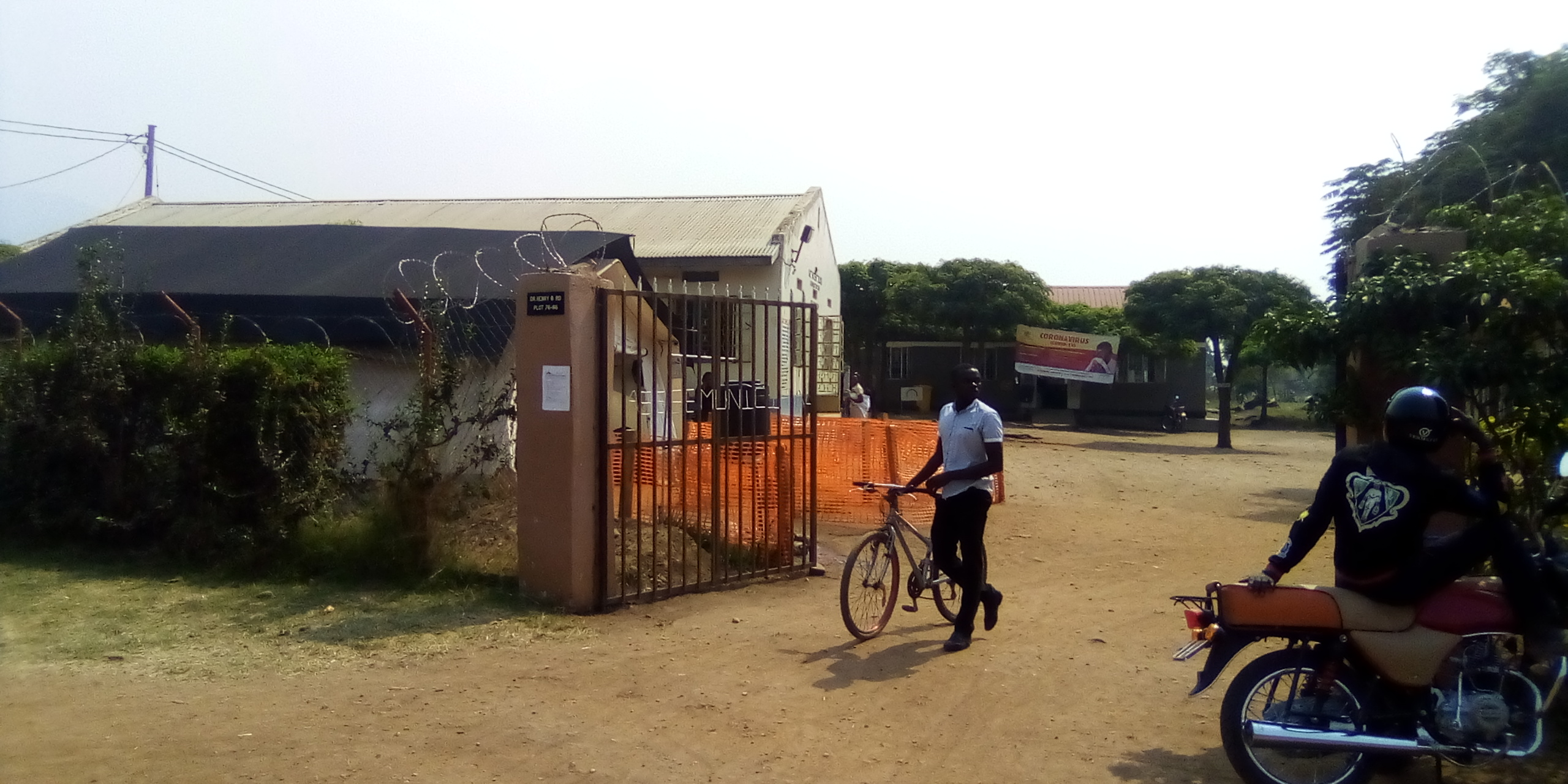
Kasese Municipal health center iii in August 2020

Kasese Municipal Health Centre III is a Ugandan health facility found in the Municipality of Kasese, at a level of health centre III, with recent plans to run as a community hospital for Ruloki Health Centre IV. It is one of the longest existing hospitals in the Kasese District and Rwenzururu Kingdom in Western Region, Uganda.

== Location ==
The health centre is located along Kilembe road, Kasese municipality, Kasese district, western region of Uganda.

== History ==
In 2011, Kasese Municipal Health Centre III was temporarily closed due to a of lack of toilets. Being the major health unit in the municipality, the administration closed the health centre after the pit latrine filled up. The Centre has been struggling with more than 87 patients who were evacuated from Kilembe Mines Hospital as a result of flooding when River Nyamwamba burst its banks.

The patients were taken to Municipal health center, St. Paul, Rukoki health center and Kagando hospital. According to James Muliwabyo of the Centre, the Kasese Municipal health Centre III lacked adequate technical resources and drugs to handle cases in need of surgery.

== Controversy ==
This Hospital in 2011 was temporarily closed due to a lack of toilets. However, the management quickly took action and the hospital was reopened with better facilities.

== See also ==
- Kitagata General Hospital
- Kitgum Hospital
- Kitojo Hospital
- Kitovu Hospital
- Kiwoko Hospital
- Kuluva Hospital
- Kyenjojo General Hospital
- Lira Hospital
- Lwala Hospital Kaberamaido
- Lyantonde General Hospital
