= Kampala International University School of Health Sciences =

Ugandan higher education institution

- Motto: Exploring the heights
- Type: Private
- Established: 2004
- Affiliations: Kampala International University
- Deputy Vice Chancellor: Professor Patrick Kyamanywa
- Location: Ishaka, Bushenyi District, Uganda; 00°32′19″S 30°08′40″E
- Campus: Urban

Kampala International University School of Health Sciences is the school of health sciences of Kampala International University, a private Ugandan university. The school provides health sciences education at the diploma, undergraduate and postgraduate levels.

== Location ==
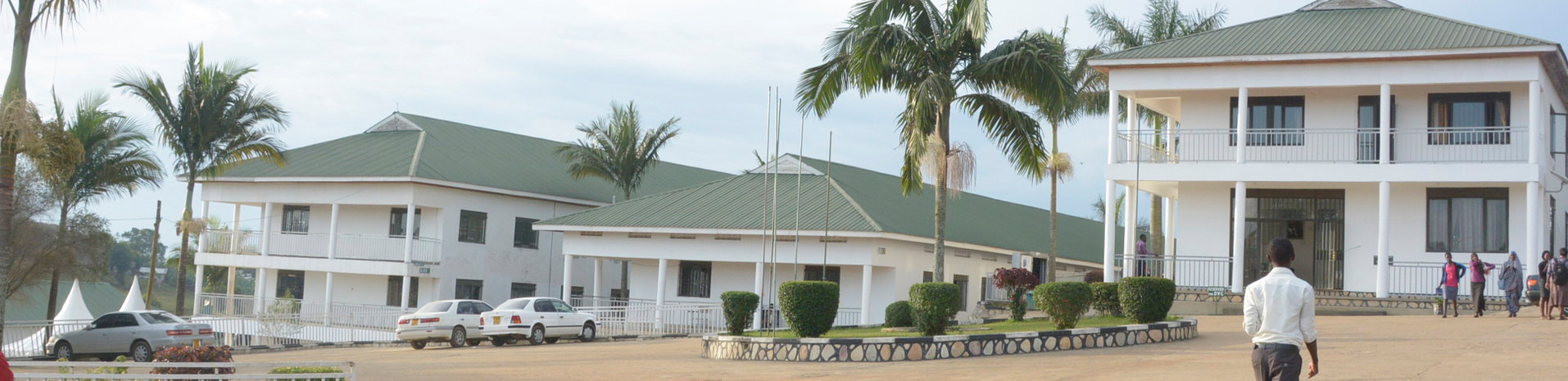
University campus at Ishaka

The school's campus is located in the town of Ishaka, in Bushenyi District, Western Uganda, approximately 330 kilometres (210 mi), by road, southwest of Kampala, Uganda's largest city and capital. The campus is also called Kampala International University Western Campus, to distinguish it from Kampala International University Main Campus located in Kansanga, Makindye Division, Kampala. The coordinates of Kampala International University's Western Campus are:0°32'19.0"S, 30°08'40.0"E (Latitude:-0.538611; Longitude:30.144444).

== Overview ==
The school was established in 2004 and admitted the first batch of students that year. Those pioneer students, numbering twenty-three, graduated in 2010. The students at the school come from Uganda and other African countries, especially Kenya. The school is licensed to teach undergraduate and postgraduate courses in Human Medicine, Dentistry, Pharmacy and Nursing. KIU School of Health Sciences is recognised by the medical and dental licensing boards in Kenya, Tanzania and Uganda. Faculty are sourced from Uganda, Cuba, Democratic Republic of the Congo, Nigeria and the Philippines.

== Teaching hospitals ==
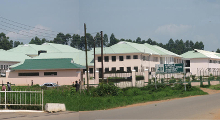
The teaching hospital in Ishaka

The school is affiliated with the following hospitals, for the purposes of teaching its students:

- KIU Teaching Hospital - Ishaka
- Fort Portal Regional Referral Hospital - Fort Portal
- Hoima Regional Referral Hospital - Hoima
- Mubende Regional Referral Hospital - Mubende
- Jinja Regional Referral Hospital -Jinja
- Kiryandongo General Hospital - Kiryandongo
- Lira Regional Referral Hospital - Lira
- Kayunga Regional Referral Hospital - Kayunga

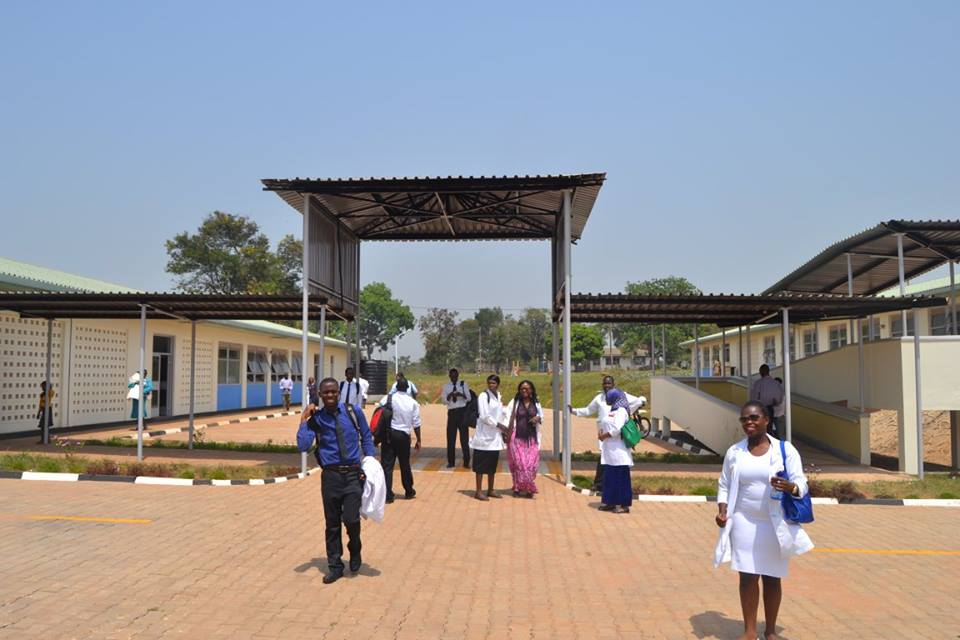
Students retire after lectures at Kiryandongo Hospital

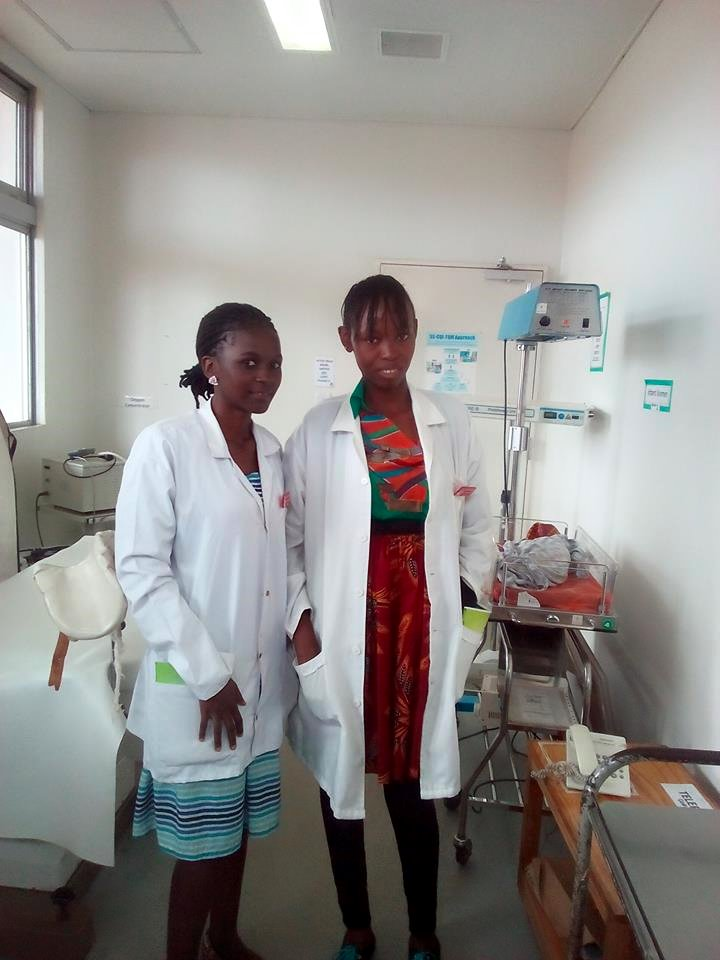
Medical students stationed at Mubende hospital

== Academic departments ==
The school maintains the following faculties:

- Faculty of Medicine
- Faculty of Pharmacy
- Faculty of Dentistry
- Faculty of Nursing
- Faculty of Social Science

== Diploma courses ==
The following diploma courses are offered at KIU Western Campus:

- Diploma in Clinical Medicine and Community Health (Dip.CM&CH
- Diploma in Nursing Science] (Dip.NS)
- Diploma in Pharmacy (Dip.Pharm)
- Diploma in Medical Laboratory Technology (DMLT)

== Undergraduate courses ==
The following degrees are offered:

- Bachelor of Medicine and Bachelor of Surgery (MBChB)
- Bachelor of Pharmacy (B.Pharm)
- Bachelor of Science in Nursing (BSN)
- Bachelor of Science in Clinical Medicine & Community Health. (BSc.CMCH)
- Bachelor of Medical Laboratory Technology (BMLT)
- Bachelor of Science in Anatomy (Bsc.Anat)
- Bachelor of Science in Physiology (BSc.Physiol)
- Bachelor of Science in Biochemistry (BSc.BC)
- Bachelor of Science in Pharmacology (BSc.Pharmcol)

== Postgraduate courses ==
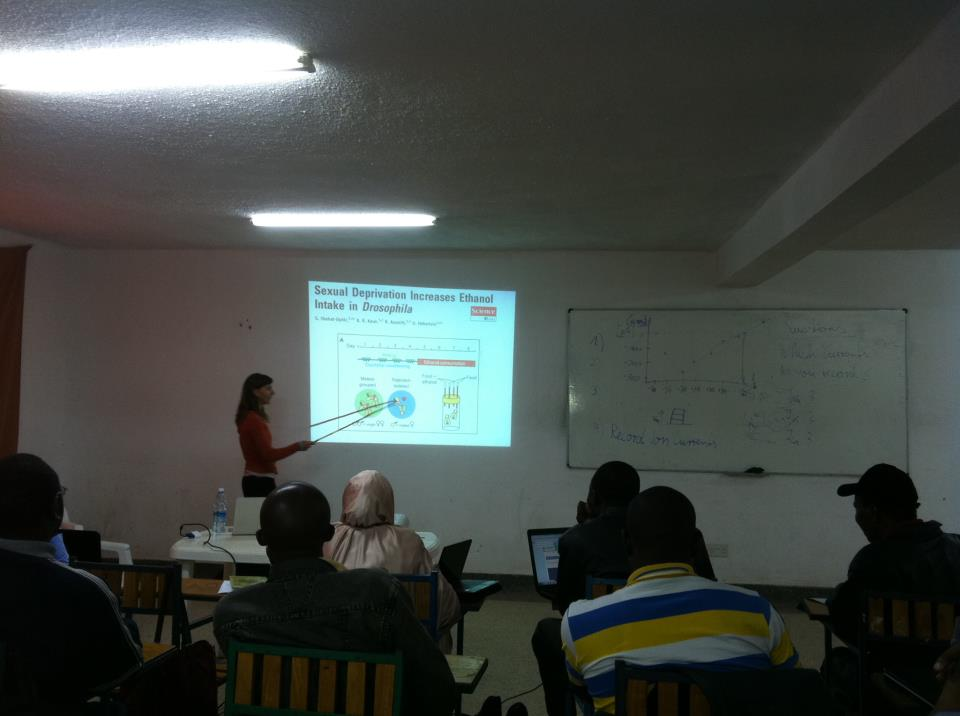
post-graduate students attending a lecture

As of June 2011, the school offers the following postgraduate courses:

- Master of Science in Microbiology (MSc.Microbiol.)
- Master of Science in Human Anatomy (MSc.Anat.)
- Master of Science in Physiology (MSc.Physiol.
- Master of Science in Biochemistry (MSc.Biochem.)
- Master of Science in Pharmacology (MSc.Pharmacol.)
- Master of Science in Public Health (MSc.Pub.Hlth.)
- Master of Medicine in Internal Medicine (M.Med.Med.)
- Master of Medicine in Surgery (M.Med.Surg.)
- Master of Medicine in Paediatrics & Child Health (M.Med.Paed.)
- Master of Medicine in Obstetrics & Gynaecology (M.Med.Obs/Gyn.)

== Photos ==
- Photo of KIU Western Campus In 2009

== See also ==
- Education in Uganda
- Uganda Universities
- Uganda University Leaders
- Uganda Medical Schools
- KIU
