= CoRSU Rehabilitation Hospital =

- CoRSU (a non-profit organization)

Geography
- Location: Kisubi, Wakiso District, Buganda Region, Uganda
- Coordinates: 00°07′58″N 32°32′08″E

Organisation
- Care system: Private
- Type: Surgical rehabilitation

History
- Founded: July 1, 2006; 19 years ago

Links
- Website: Homepage
- Other links: Hospitals in Uganda

CoRSU Rehabilitation Hospital Services for people with Disability in Uganda(CoRSU), is a specialized surgical hospital in the Buganda Region of Uganda specifically for people with disabilities. The hospital established in 2009 as a local Non- Government Organization with the main aim of providing high quality rehabilitation and surgical services to people with disabilities in Uganda which account for over 50 percent of the patients served. About 45 percent of those served, receive plastic surgery, VVF repair and burns treatment. The hospital mostly gives first priority to children with physical deterioration and diseases where it serves them with orthopeadic and plastic surgeries.

== Location ==
The hospital is located in Kisubi Entebbe road, a neighborhood in Wakiso District, in Uganda's Central Region (Buganda). This is along the Kampala–Entebbe Road, approximately 33 kilometres (21 mi), by road, south of Mulago National Referral Hospital, in Kampala, Uganda's capital city.

This is about 18 kilometres (11 mi), by road, north-east of Entebbe International Airport, Uganda's largest civilian and military airport. The coordinates of CoRSU Rehabilitation Hospital are 0°07'58.0"N, 32°32'08.0"E (Latitude:0.132778; Longitude:32.535556).

== Overview ==
At this hospital children below the age of 18 are treated at no cost to the patient or family. As of December 2017, CoRSU Hospital Uganda maintained the following departments:

- Orthopedic Surgery
- Plastic Surgery
- Rehabilitative Services
- Nursing Services
- Nutrition Services
- Dental Services
- VVF Department
- Private Patient Services
- Department of Community Outreach
- Human Resources Department
- Department of Strategic Information.

== History ==
The hospital was established in 2006, as a non-government, non-profit organization by various stakeholders. Key among the founders and financial backers of CoRSU, is the international charity, Christian Blind Mission (CBM), whose main objective is the improvement and expansion of "the medical rehabilitation services for children and people with disability in Uganda". A private wing to cater to patients with the ability to pay, has been established to increase hospital revenue. Typically these patients have been travelling to Kenya, India, South Africa, Europe and North America, to receive specialized surgical services.

== Disease profile ==
The surgical disease burden, at the hospital in 2017, is summarized in the table below:

Surgical Procedures 2017 by Condition
Rank	Disease	Numbers	Percentage
1	Fractures	258	4.86
2	Club foot	343	6.46
3	Limb deformities	530	9.98
4	Osteomyelitis	614	11.56
5	Other orthopedic procedures	1,384	26.05
6	Cosmetic surgery	22	0.41
7	Burns	355	6.68
8	Cleft palate/Cleft lip	355	6.68
9	Other plastic procedures	1,252	23.57
10	Vesicovaginal fistula	199	3.75
	Total	5,312	100.00

== Financials ==
According to the hospital's Annual Report for 2017, the hospital received funding from various international and domestic donors, amounting to USh 12,907,338,000 (approx. US$3,480,000). The biggest donor was CBM, accounting for about 43 percent of all donations. The two largest expenses were (a) staff salaries and allowances, accounting for 37 percent of total expenditure, followed by administration expenses which consumed just over 25 percent of all expenses in 2017.

== See also ==
- List of hospitals in Uganda
- CURE Children's Hospital of Uganda
- Holy Innocents Children's Hospital
- Kisubi Hospital
