= Gulu Military Hospital =

Coordinates: 02°46′57″N 32°17′04″E

Gulu Military Hospital is a hospital in Gulu, in the Northern Region of Uganda.

== Location ==
The hospital is located in the city of Gulu, in Gulu District, in the Acholi sub-region, in Northern Uganda, on the campus of the headquarters of the 4th Division of the Uganda People's Defence Force (UPDF), about 3 kilometres (2 mi) northwest of Gulu Regional Referral Hospital. The hospital caters to UPDF personnel and their families.

== See also ==
- Bombo Military Hospital
- List of hospitals in Uganda
- Mbuya Military Hospital
- Nakasongola Military Hospital
