= Kagadi General Hospital =

- Uganda Ministry of Health
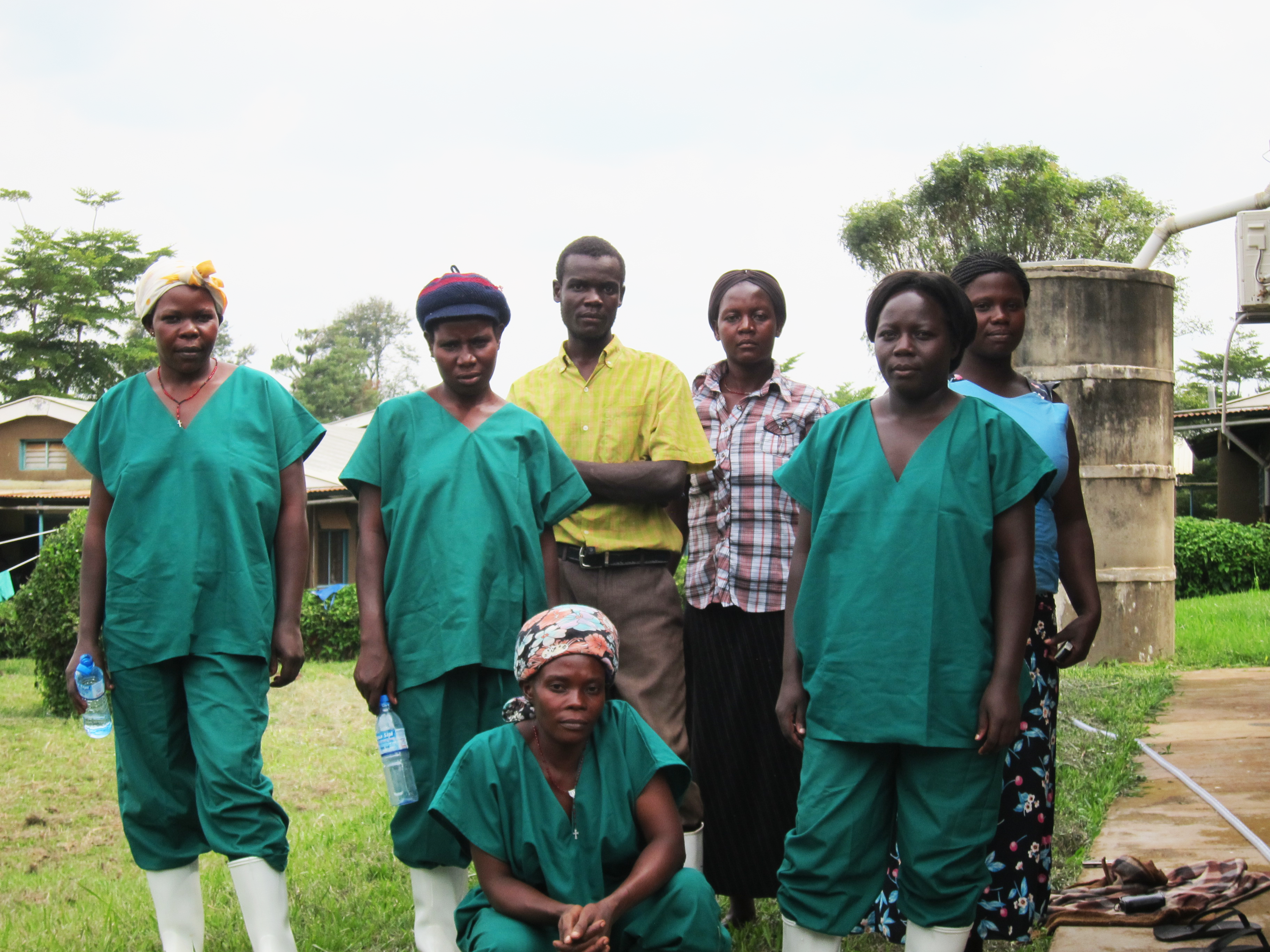
- Hospital staff during the Ebola outbreak in summer 2012

- Location within Uganda

Geography
- Location: Kagadi, Kagadi District, Western Region, Uganda
- Coordinates: 00°56′30″N 30°48′32″E

Organisation
- Care system: Public
- Type: General

Services
- Emergency department: I
- Beds: 100

History
- Founded: 1969

Links
- Other links: Hospitals in Uganda

Kagadi General Hospital is a hospital in the Western Region of Uganda.

== Location ==
The hospital is on the Kyenjojo–Kabwoya Road, in the town of Kagadi in Kagadi District, about 93 kilometres (58 mi) south-west of Hoima Regional Referral Hospital.

This is about 104 kilometres (65 mi) northwest of Mubende Regional Referral Hospital. The geographical coordinates of Kagadi General Hospital are 0°56'30.0"N, 30°48'32.0"E (Latitude:0.941661; Longitude:30.808889).

== Overview ==
Kagadi General Hospital was built and is owned by the government of Uganda. In July 2012, the hospital experienced an outbreak of Ebola Hemorrhagic Fever. Like many hospitals in Uganda, the hospital faces challenges of understaffing, poor pay, and late salary payments.

== See also ==
- List of hospitals in Uganda
