= Nyenga =

Nyenga, may refer to one of the following:

- Nyenga, Kenya, a settlement in Nyanza Province, western Kenya
- Nyenga, Uganda, a village in Buikwe District, Central Uganda
