= Kyenjojo General Hospital =

- Uganda Ministry of Health
- Location within Uganda

Geography
- Location: Kyenjojo, Kyenjojo District, Western Region, Uganda
- Coordinates: 00°37′01″N 30°38′15″E

Organisation
- Care system: Public
- Type: General

Services
- Emergency department: I
- Beds: 100

History
- Founded: 2011

Links
- Other links: Hospitals in Uganda

Kyenjojo General Hospital, also Kyenjojo District Hospital, or Kyenjojo Government Hospital, is a hospital in the Western Region of Uganda.

== Location ==
The hospital is off of the Mubende-Kyegegwa-Kyenjojo-Fort Portal Road, in the town of Kyenjojo in Kyenjojo District, approximately 50 kilometres (31 mi), by road, east of Fort Portal Regional Referral Hospital.

This is about 98 kilometres (61 mi) west of Mubende Regional Referral Hospital. The coordinates of Kyenjojo Hospital are 0°37'01.0"N, 30°38'15.0"E (Latitude:0.616942; Longitude:30.637493).

== Overview ==
Prior to attaining hospital status, Kyenjojo General Hospital was Kyenjojo Health Centre IV, the largest government health care facility in the district. The hospital attends to the general population but sees a fair number of obstetric complications, and a significant number of road accident victims. The hospital is on the list of general hospitals earmarked for renovation and expansion.

== See also ==
- List of hospitals in Uganda
