= Mayanja Memorial Hospital =

Ugandan private community hospital

- Mayanja Memorial Hospital Foundation

Geography
- Location: Mbarara, Mbarara District,, Western Region, Uganda
- Coordinates: 00°36′57″S 30°39′41″E

Organisation
- Care system: Private, Non Profit Hospital
- Type: General

Services
- Emergency department: III
- Beds: 100

History
- Founded: 2003

Links
- Other links: Hospitals in Uganda

Mayanja Memorial Hospital (MMH), is a private, not-for-profit hospital in Mbarara, the largest city in the Western Region of Uganda.

== Location ==
The hospital is located in the neighborhood of Nyamityobora, in Kakoba Division, approximately 4 kilometres (2 mi), by road, southwest of Mbarara Regional Referral Hospital, in the city's central business district. The geographical coordinates of Mayanja Memorial Hospital are: 0°36'57.0"S, 30°39'41.0"E (Latitude:-0.615833; Longitude:30.661389).

== Overview ==
MMH is an urban, private, not-for-profit, community hospital that serves the population of Mbarara and surrounding districts. The hospital aims to address the gap in healthcare delivery in the country and to serve that segment of Uganda's population that has been seeking the missing services from outside Uganda. The hospital is owned and operated by Mayanja Memorial Hospital Foundation, a Ugandan Non-governmental organization. The affairs of the hospital are directed by a Board of Directors.

== History ==
MMH is named after the late Martin Luther Mayanja, the father of the founder-proprietor, Dr Benon Mugerwa. The first phase of the hospital, with 100-bed capacity, was completed in November 2003 and cost USh5 billion (approx. US$2 million in 2003 money).

== See also ==
- Hospitals in Uganda
