= Holy Innocents Children's Hospital =

- Roman Catholic Archdiocese of Mbarara
- Holy Innocents Children's Hospital in Mbarara Uganda

- Location within Uganda

Geography
- Location: Mbarara, Mbarara District, Western Region, Uganda
- Coordinates: 00°37′23″S 30°38′50″E

Organisation
- Care system: Private, non-profit
- Type: Pediatric hospital

Services
- Emergency department: I
- Beds: 100

History
- Founded: 2009

Links
- Website: Homepage
- Other links: Hospitals in Uganda

Holy Innocents Children's Hospital (HICH) is a pediatric general hospital in the Western Region of Uganda. Founded in 2009, it is the second entirely pediatric hospital in the country, the other being CURE Children's Hospital of Uganda (CCHU), located in Mbale, in Eastern Uganda, which was founded in 2000.

== Location ==
HICH is located in the city of Mbarara, approximately 3 kilometres (2 mi) west of Mbarara Regional Referral Hospital, the largest hospital in the Western Region of Uganda, and the nearest regional referral hospital.

This location is approximately 272 kilometres (169 mi), by road southwest of Mulago National Referral Hospital in Kampala, Uganda's capital and largest city.

== Overview ==
The hospital is a collaborative effort between many stakeholders, including the following:

- Roman Catholic Archdiocese of Mbarara
- Uganda Catholic Medical Bureau
- University of San Diego School of Nursing & Health Sciences
- University of California, San Diego School of Medicine
- Children's Hospital Oakland
- Roman Catholic Diocese of San Diego
- California State University, Northridge
- Rady Children's Hospital, San Diego
- Private businesspeople and entrepreneurs
- Donors and volunteers worldwide

== Operation ==
Holy Innocents Children's Hospital is a member of the Uganda Catholic Medical Bureau. As of October 2020, its capacity was 55 beds. Annual outpatient visits were 20,468, with 3,922 annual admissions. Patient user fees accounted for 45.3 percent of the total hospital annual income.

== See also ==
- Roman Catholic Archdiocese of Mbarara
- Hospitals in Uganda
- Uganda Catholic Medical Bureau
