= Hoima Specialized Referral Hospital =

Private faith-based community hospital in Uganda

- Roman Catholic Diocese of Hoima

Geography
- Location: Bujumbura, Hoima, Western Region, Uganda
- Coordinates: 01°26′30″N 31°21′18″E

Organisation
- Care system: Private, Non-profit
- Type: Specialized Maternity, Pediatric and Gynecologic

Services
- Emergency department: I
- Beds: 272

History
- Founded: 2030 Expected

Links
- Other links: Hospitals in Uganda; Medical education in Uganda

Hoima Specialized Referral Hospital (HSRH), whose official name is St. Mary's Children and Women Specialized Hospital, is a proposed hospital in the city of Hoima, in Uganda. The community, faith-based, non-profit hospital is meant to offer specialized care that is in short supply in the city and in the sub-region and to offer relief to Hoima Regional Referral Hospital that is overwhelmed by the number of patients seeking care there. HSRH is owned and is under development by the Roman Catholic Diocese of Hoima.

== Location ==
Th hospital would sit on 7 acres (2.8 ha) of diocesan real estate, in the neighborhood called Bujumbura, on Bujumbura Hill, in the western part of Hoima City, in the Western Region of Uganda.

== Background ==
In 2020, the Uganda Bureau of Statistics (UBOS) projected the mid-year population of Hoima City at 122,000 people. Due to Uganda's nascent oil industry that is under development in the 2000s, the city of Hoima, where the industry is based, is experiencing rapid population growth. The city's population is expanding rapidly, at an average annual rate of 3.54 percent, between 2014 and 2020.

As of June 2022, Hoima City had one referral hospital, the 317-bed Hoima Regional Referral Hospital, serving the entire Bunyoro sub-region and parts of neighboring Democratic Republic of the Congo; a catchment area of nearly 3 million people in 2019.

The aim of establishing HSRH is to offer specialized health care that is in short supply and to act as the second referral hospital in the city and sub-region, easing the pressure off of Hoima Regional Referral Hospital that is currently overwhelmed.

== Overview ==
The design calls for a five-level modern hospital building with 272 in-patient beds. Major departments include (a) Emergency Room (b) Pediatrics (c) Antenatal (d) Delivery Rooms (e) Operating Theaters and others.

The cost of construction is budgeted at USh40 billion (approx. US$11 million). The developers expect to raise funding through (a) donations from parishioners (b) donations from other Ugandans (c) donations from the Roman Catholic Church (d) specific fundraising events and activities (e) contribution from the Government of Uganda. The hospital will be constructed in phases, over a seven-year period.

In August 2024, Yoweri Museveni, the Ugandan head of state, through his prime mister Robinah Nabbanja, donated USh300 million (approx. US$81,000) towards the construction of this hospital.

== See also ==
- Healthcare in Uganda
