= Pope John's Hospital Aber =

Private community hospital in Uganda

Pope John’s Hospital Aber
- Uganda Catholic Medical Bureau

Geography
- Location: Atarapa, Oyam District, Northern Region, Uganda
- Coordinates: 02°14′06″N 32°23′16″E

Organisation
- Type: Community

Services
- Emergency department: I
- Beds: 220

History
- Founded: 1953

Links
- Website: stjohnxxiiihospitalaber.org
- Lists: Hospitals in Uganda

Pope John's Hospital Aber, commonly known as Atarapa Hospital is a private hospital in Atarapa Trading Centre, Oyam District, Lango sub-region, in the Northern Region of Uganda. The hospital is named after Pope John XIII.

== Location ==
The hospital is located approximately 12 kilometres (7.5 mi), by road, southwest of Oyam, where the district headquarters are located. This is approximately 67 kilometres (42 mi) west of Lira Regional Referral Hospital, in the city of Lira.

Pope John's Hospital Aber is located approximately 72.5 kilometres (45 mi), south of Gulu Regional Referral Hospital, in the city of Gulu. The geographical coordinates of Pope John's Hospital Aber are: 02°14'06.0"N, 32°23'16.0"E (Latitude:2.235000; Longitude:32.387778).

== Overview ==
Pope John's Hospital Aber is a private, non-profit, community hospital owned by the Roman Catholic Diocese of Lira and is accredited by the Uganda Catholic Medical Bureau. The hospital is administered by Sisters of Mary, Mother of the Church, a religious congregation. The hospital has a capacity of 220 beds.

== History ==
The hospital was founded as a dispensary in 1953. In 1969, the Comboni Sisters opened a full service hospital at the site of the dispensary. In 1993 the hospital was handed over to the Roman Catholic Diocese of Lira, who entrusted its administration to the Sisters of Mary, Mother of the Church. The two major challenges include (a) a high number of HIV/AIDS patients, accounting for 6 percent of prenatal patients and 9 percent of the adult Oyam District adults and (b) a Radiology Department that is poorly equipped and poorly resourced.

== Hospital operations ==
As of December 2019, the hospital attended to 27,827 outpatients annually, on average. It admitted 6,800 inpatients every year, on average, with a bed occupancy ratio of approximately 40 percent, on average. There were 1,700 maternal deliveries every year, on average, with a caesarian section rate of 21 percent. Patient user fees accounted for about 20.2 percent of total hospital income at that time.

== Recent developments ==
In May 2021, the hospital maneuvered their own way and installed a new CT scanner, valued at USh1.3 billion (approx. US$369,000), at this hospital without government injecting a single cent. As of that time, it was the only working CT scanner in the Northern Region of Uganda.

== See also ==
- Hospitals in Uganda
