= Entebbe Military Hospital =

Coordinates: 00°05′01″N 32°28′50″E

- Uganda Ministry of Defence and Uganda People's Defence Force
- Map of Uganda showing the location of Entebbe.

Geography
- Location: Entebbe, Wakiso District, Central Region, Uganda

Organisation
- Care system: Private
- Type: General
- Affiliated university: UPDF Special Forces Command

Services
- Emergency department: I
- Beds: 100

History
- Founded: 1986

Links
- Other links: Hospitals in Uganda

Entebbe Military Hospital, also Katabi Military Hospital or Katabi UPDAF Hospital, but whose official name is Ronald Bata Memorial Hospital, is a military hospital in Uganda.

== Location ==
The hospital is located on the premises of the Entebbe UPDF Air Force base, in the Katabi neighborhood, in the city of Entebbe, about 40 kilometres (25 mi) south of Mulago National Referral Hospital. This is approximately 40 kilometres (25 mi) southwest of Mbuya Military Hospital, the largest military hospital in the country. The coordinates of the hospital are 0°05'01.0"N, 32°28'50.0"E (Latitude:0.083612; Longitude:32.480557).

== Overview ==
The hospital caters to the units of the UPDF stationed in Entebbe, including the Air Force and Special Forces Command.

== History ==
The hospital underwent renovations and an upgrade in 2017, at an estimated cost of USh293 million (approx. US$80,000). The upgrade, carried out by the UPDF Engineering brigade took about eighteen weeks. The hospital's name was officially re-branded to Ronald Bata Memorial Hospital, in memory of the late Dr. Ronald Bata, the first medical doctor to join the National Resistance Army guerrilla outfit in 1982, during Ugandan Bush War. Approximately 75 percent of the patients are civilians from the surrounding community.

== See also ==
- List of hospitals in Uganda
