= Kiryandongo General Hospital =

Public hospital in the Western Region of Uganda

- Uganda Ministry of Health
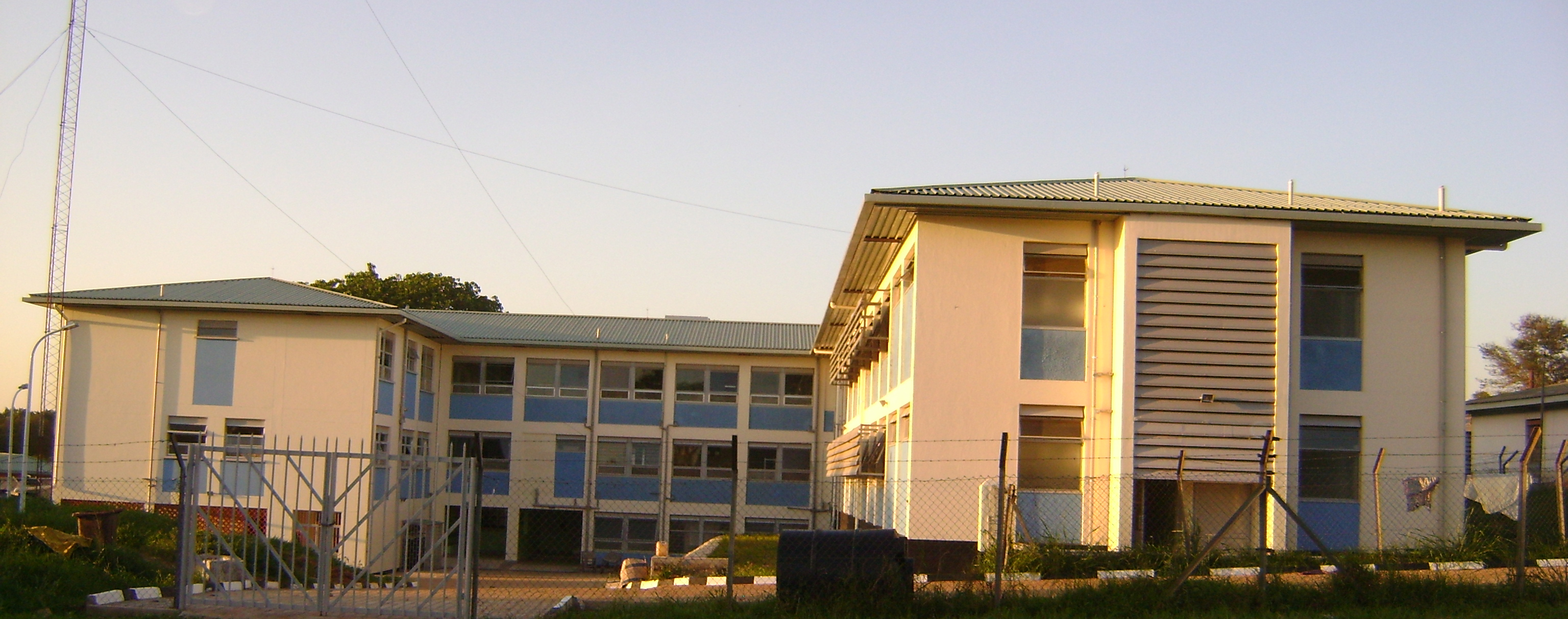
- Kiryandongo General Hospital

- Location within Uganda

Geography
- Location: Kiryandongo, Kiryandongo District, Western Region, Uganda
- Coordinates: 01°52′46″N 32°03′43″E

Organisation
- Care system: Public
- Type: General

Services
- Emergency department: I
- Beds: 109

History
- Founded: 1974

Links
- Other links: Hospitals in Uganda

Kiryandongo General Hospital, is a public hospital in the Western Region of Uganda.

== Location ==
The hospital is on the Kampala–Gulu highway, in Kikube Parish, Kiryandongo sub-county, Kibanda County, in Kiryandongo District, about 50 kilometres (31 mi) north-east of Masindi General Hospital, in the town of Masindi. This is approximately 101 kilometres (63 mi), northeast of Hoima Regional Referral Hospital, in the city of Hoima.

Kiryandongo General Hospital is located approximately 209 kilometres (130 mi) northwest of Mulago National Referral Hospital, the largest hospital in the country.

== Overview ==
Kiryandongo General Hospital is a 109-bed, government-owned hospital. It serves Kiryandongo District and parts of the districts of Masindi, Nakasongola, Oyam, Apac, Amuru, and Nwoya.

Beginning in December 2013, the government of Uganda, using a loan from the World Bank, began renovating this hospital at a cost of US$5,654,229. The renovations included the following: 1. New and bigger Outpatients Department 2. A new Emergency Room (Casualty Department) 3. Laundry facilities for family members of patients 4. Kitchen facilities for family members of patients 5. A new incinerator 6. Disposal facilities for placentas and other biohazard waste 7. Twelve new staff houses 8. Replacement of broken glass in windows and doors 9. Internal and external whitewash 10. Replace old 50kVA transformer with new 500kVA unit 11. Upgrade the water supply including a new 144,000 litres (31,676 imp gal; 38,041 US gal) reservoir 12. Dig a borehole powered with a solar water pump 13. Upgrade and repair internal and external plumbing.

== See also ==
- List of hospitals in Uganda
