= Nile International Hospital =

- Location in Uganda

Geography
- Location: Masese Division -Jinja District, Eastern Region, Uganda, Uganda
- Coordinates: 0°26′24″N 33°13′07″E

Organisation
- Care system: Private
- Type: General

Services
- Beds: 35

History
- Founded: 2015

Links
- Website: Website

Nile International Hospital is one of the biggest hospitals in Uganda and specifically the biggest in the Eastern Region Eastern Region, Uganda. It is located in Jinja City the second largest city next to Kampala in Uganda. Other hospitals in Uganda include Mulago National Referral Hospital, International Hospital Kampala, International Specialized Hospital of Uganda and TMR International Hospital. Other large hospitals in Jinja include the Jinja Regional Referral Hospital, Al-Shafa Modern Hospital Ltd. and Rippon Medical Center located at Nile Ave, Jinja-Uganda.

The hospital provides all the basic medical services and also the basic medical specialties such as gynecology, cardiology, neurology, urology and pediatrics. It also provides to the people of the region basic diagnostic services such as laboratory services, cardiology and radiology services.

Other services which you will find include operation theatres, inpatient services, both (ICU) Intensive Care Unit and (NICU) Neonatal Intensive Care Unit, a physiotherapy and rehabilitation center.

The facility is also known to be exceptionally hygienic, although this is expected for a medical facility it is not usually so especially for hospitals in developing countries due to congestion, economic problems, lack of qualified personnel to supervise, manage and maintain public hygiene and sanitation, etc.

== ICU(Intensive Care Unit) and NICU(Neonatal Intensive Care Unit) ==
This development at Nile International Hospital was so crucial and vital in that these services were brought closer to people in regions such as Jinja, Iganga, Buikwe, Kayunga and other regions in or near Eastern Uganda. The people always had to travel to Kampala in order to receive these services.

== Location ==
The hospital is located on plots Plots 2-16 of Walukuba in Jinja City of Uganda.

== History ==
It was officially opened by the President of Uganda, Yoweri Kaguta Museveni, on 28 January 2015. Ever since it has been actively participating in the health of the region by providing such services which would otherwise not be found anywhere else in the Eastern Region of Uganda. For this reason many people prior to its opening entirely depended on the hospitals in Kampala(The capital city of Uganda, located in the central region).

== Medical Departments ==
- Neural Surgery
- Orthopedics
- Dental and oral health
- Emergency
- General surgery
- Gynecology and obstetrics
- Internal medicine
- Nutrition & Dietetics
- Cardiology
- Urology
- Laboratory
- Ophthalmology
- Pediatrics
- Radiology
- Physiotherapy
- Ear, Nose and Throat (ENT)

== Diagnostic Departments ==
=== Laboratory ===
- Hematology
- Parasitology
- Biochemistry
- Immunology
- Micro-biology
- Pathology

=== Radiology ===
- CT Scan
- 3D Ultrasound Scan
- X-ray
- C-Arm x-ray

=== Cardiology ===
- ECG(Electrocardiography)
- Echocardiography
- Holter monitoring

== See also ==
- Nakasero Hospital
- Paragon Hospital
- List of hospitals in Uganda
- Case Medical Centre
