= Restoration Gateway Hospital =

Hospital in Uganda

- Restoration Gateway & BaylorScott & White Healthcare Systems

Geography
- Location: Karuma Township, Kiryandongo District, Western Region, Uganda
- Coordinates: 02°13′25″N 32°17′15″E

Organisation
- Care system: Private, Missionary
- Type: General and Teaching

Services
- Beds: 180

History
- Founded: 2018

Links
- Other links: List of hospitals in Uganda; Medical education in Uganda

The Restoration Gateway Hospital (RGH), also Restoration Gateway Medical Centre, is a private, Christian-affiliated general medical facility in Uganda. The hospital, which has been under construction since 2012, is being expanded in phases.

== Location ==
The facility is located in Bedmot Village, in Karuma Township, on the western banks of the Victoria Nile, approximately 6 kilometres (4 mi), by road, east of the Kampala–Gulu Highway. The hospital is about 40 kilometres (25 mi), by road, north-east of Kiryandongo, the location of the district headquarters. The geographical coordinates of Restoration Gateway Hospital are: 02°13'25.0"N, 32°17'15.0"E (Latitude:2.2236; Longitude:32.2875).

== Overview ==
The hospital is part of a master plan to rehabilitate war-ravaged northern Uganda, that was drawn up in 2005. It encompasses, the hospital, a nursing school, a dental school and residency training programs in major medical and surgical disciplines.

Other programs include a modern agricultural farm, a radio station, homes for orphaned children, primary, secondary and tertiary educational institutions. Other planned programs include adult education, vocational education such as driver training, basic mechanics, masonry training, welding classes and computer literacy training.

As of April 2018, 140 orphans from the districts in the Acholi sub-region and the Lango sub-region attend Restoration Gateway schools.

== International collaboration ==
The Restoration Gateway Project was conceived and created by Dr. David Tim McCall and his wife Janice. Financial and developmental supervision is provided by the Restoration Gateway Organization, a Christian nongovernmental organization, based in Texas, United States, which the McCall's founded.

The hospital also receives support from the BaylorScott & White Healthcare Systems, a leading healthcare system in the United States of America.

At the commissioning ceremony on Thursday 12 April 2018, President Yoweri Museveni of Uganda, committed to extending the national electricity grid to the facility, to reduce the hospital's dependency on diesel fuel electricity generators. He also promised to tarmac the 6 kilometres (4 mi) access road to the hospital.

== See also ==
- Hospitals in Uganda
- List of medical schools in Uganda
