= Kitovu Hospital =

Private community hospital in Uganda

- Uganda Catholic Medical Bureau

Geography
- Location: Kitovu, Masaka District, Central Region, Uganda
- Coordinates: 00°20′36″S 31°45′28″E

Organisation
- Care system: Private
- Type: Community

Services
- Emergency department: I
- Beds: 250

History
- Founded: 1955

Links
- Website: Homepage
- Other links: Hospitals in Uganda; Medical education in Uganda

Kitovu Hospital is a hospital in Kitovu, a neighborhood within the city of Masaka, Masaka District, Central Uganda. It is a private, community hospital, serving the city of Masaka and surrounding communities. It runs a specialist program to repair obstetric fistulas, that was founded by Dr. Maura Lynch; one of about six centers in the country that can do so.

== Location ==
The hospital is located in the neighborhood called Kitovu, in the city of Masaka, in Masaka District, in the Central Region of Uganda. This location is approximately 7 kilometres (4 mi), by road, southeast of the Masaka Regional Referral Hospital, the nearest regional referral hospital. Kitovu Hospital is located approximately 133 kilometres (83 mi), by road, southwest of Mulago National Referral Hospital, the largest referral hospital in Uganda, that is located in Kampala, the capital city of that country. The geographical coordinates of Kitovu Hospital are:00°20'36.0"S, 31°45'28.0"E (Latitude:-0.343333; Longitude:31.757778).

== Overview ==
Kitovu Hospital is a private, non-profit, community hospital owned by the Roman Catholic Diocese of Masaka and is accredited by the Uganda Catholic Medical Bureau. The hospital is administered by the Daughters of Mary Sisters, an indigenous religious congregation. The original planned capacity was 200 in-patient beds. However, as of January 2014, the hospital has more than 250 in-patient beds.

The hospital has a comprehensive community based primary healthcare program, including an HIV/AIDS treatment center. Other specialized units include a regional blood bank, a neonatal care unit, a nutritional rehabilitation unit and a school for laboratory assistants. The hospital also serves as an Internship Hospital in collaboration with Makerere University School of Medicine. The area served by the hospital extends to the neighboring districts of Sembabule, Lyantonde, Bukomansimbi, Kalangala, Kalungu, Kyotera, Lwengo and Rakai.

Kitovu Hospital has 31 beds dedicated to the treatment of patients with obstetric fistula, also referred to as vesicovaginal fistula (VVF). There are only six or so hospitals in Uganda with the expertise to carry out the necessary surgery in these cases. Those hospitals include: (1) Kitovu Hospital (2) Mulago National Referral Hospital (3) Hoima Regional Referral Hospital (4) Nsambya Hospital (5) Kagando Hospital (6) Lacor Hospital.

== History ==
At the invitation of the late Archbishop Joseph Kiwanuka (1899 - 1966), the first African Roman Catholic Bishop in sub-Saharan Africa, the Sisters of the Medical Missionaries of Mary (MMM) founded a First Aid Post at Kitovu, Masaka, Uganda in 1955. The institution initially offered out-patient services only. Later, in-patient services were introduced. The MMM Sisters administered the hospital from 1955 until 2001 when they handed over the running of the hospital to the current administrators.

== See also ==
- Masaka District
- Hospitals in Uganda
- Obstetric fistula
