= Angal Hospital =

Ugandan private community hospital

- Uganda Catholic Medical Bureau
- Location within Uganda

Geography
- Location: Angal Village, Nyaravur sub-county, Nebbi District, Northern Region, Uganda
- Coordinates: 02°24′33″N 31°11′36″E

Organisation
- Care system: Private
- Type: Community

Services
- Emergency department: I
- Beds: 260

History
- Founded: 1940

Links
- Other links: Hospitals in Uganda

Saint Luke's Hospital, Angal, commonly known as Angal Hospital, is a private, community hospital in Angal Village, Nebbi District, West Nile sub-region, Northern Uganda.

== Location ==
The hospital is located in Angal Village, Pamora Parish, Nyaravur sub-county, Padyere County, Nebbi District, West Nile sub-region, Northern Uganda. This location lies approximately 5 kilometres (3 mi), by road, south of Nyaravur, on the road to Parombo. Angal is located approximately 22 kilometres (14 mi), by road, southeast of Nebbi, where the district headquarters are located. The geographical coordinates of Angal Hospital are: 02°24'33.0"N, 31°11'36.0"E (Latitude:2.409167; Longitude:31.193333).

== Overview ==
Angal Hospital is a private, non-profit, community hospital owned by the Roman Catholic Diocese of Nebbi. It is accredited to the Uganda Catholic Medical Bureau, and it is administered by the Comboni Missionaries, a religious congregation.

The hospital serves patients from within Nebbi District and from the neighboring districts of Arua and Zombo. Some patients come from the neighboring countries of South Sudan and the Democratic Republic of the Congo. The hospital has a bed capacity of 260. It employed 153 full-time medical and support staff, as of January 2009.

== History ==
St. Luke's Hospital, Angal was founded in the early 1940s by the Comboni Missionaries, as a maternity center. In the early 1950s, the center was upgraded to a dispensary. In 1959, the facility was granted full hospital privileges. It attained the status of a rural hospital on 13 May 1959.

== Hospital operations ==
The hospital depends on donations and subsidies from the Ugandan government in order to meet its financial obligations. A small fee is charged for patient services, but no one is turned away because of inability to pay. During the financial year 2007/2008, the hospital's total expenses were USh 1,305,503,208/= (Approx. US$524,914). Only 8.1% of the total was recovered from patient user fees. The hospital expenses that same year broke down as follows:

Angal Hospital expenses: financial year 2007/2008
Staff employment expenses	52.0
Medical goods & supplies	31.5
Transportation	8.0
Administrative costs	5.0
Capital development	3.0
Other expenses	0.5
Total	100.00

== See also ==
- List of hospitals in Uganda
