= Bududa General Hospital =

- Uganda Ministry of Health

Geography
- Location: Bududa, Bududa District, Eastern Region, Uganda
- Coordinates: 01°00′34″N 34°19′58″E

Organisation
- Care system: Public
- Type: General

Services
- Emergency department: I
- Beds: 100

History
- Founded: 1969

Links
- Other links: Hospitals in Uganda

Bududa General Hospital, also Bududa Hospital, is a hospital in the Eastern Region of Uganda.

== Location ==
The hospital is located in the town of Bududa, in Bududa District, in Bugisu sub-region, in the Eastern Region of Uganda, about 38 kilometres (24 mi) southeast of Mbale Regional Referral Hospital. The coordinates of Bududa Hospital are:01°00'34.0"N; 34°19'58.0"E (Latitude:1°00'34.0"N; Longitude:34°19'58.0"E).

== Overview ==
Bududa Hospital, with bed capacity of 100, was built in the 1960s by the government of Prime Minister Milton Obote (1962 - 1971). The hospital has not received any renovations since it was constructed. Like many of Uganda's public hospitals, Bududa General Hospital is understaffed, over-crowded, underfunded and operated with antiquated or absent equipment.

== See also ==
- List of hospitals in Uganda
