= Kawolo General Hospital =

Ugandan public hospital

- Uganda Ministry of Health

Geography
- Location: Buikwe, Buikwe District, Central Region, Uganda
- Coordinates: 00°22′05″N 32°56′44″E

Organisation
- Care system: Public
- Type: General

Services
- Emergency department: I
- Beds: 106

History
- Founded: 1967

Links
- Other links: Hospitals in Uganda

Kawolo General Hospital, also Kawolo Hospital, is a hospital in Buikwe District in the Central Region of Uganda.

== Location ==
The hospital is on the Kampala–Jinja Highway, in the town of Lugazi, in Buikwe District, about 34.5 kilometres (21 mi), west of Jinja Regional Referral Hospital. This is approximately 50 kilometres (31 mi), east of Mulago National Referral Hospital. The coordinates of Kawolo General Hospital are: 0°22'05.0"N, 32°56'44.0"E (Latitude:0.368050; Longitude:32.945553).

== Overview ==
Kawolo General Hospital was built in 1968. It has a bed capacity of 106. In 2015, it admitted 11,699 patients and delivered 3,784 babies. The hospital, which serves Buikwe District, and parts of Mukono District, Kayunga District and Buvuma District, handles a significant number of road traffic accidents on the Kampala–Jinja Highway.

== Renovations ==
In 2008, the government of Uganda and the Kingdom of Spain signed a Debt Swap Agreement, involving the creation of a Trust Fund. The resources of the Trust Fund will be used to finance the cost of a contract to finance the construction and equipping of Kawolo General Hospital. Open bidding for qualified Ugandan and Spanish firms to carry out the renovation was advertised from 29 April 2016 until 12 July 2016. The winning bidder is expected to be announced in September 2016 and contract signing is scheduled for the same month.

The contract, valued at about US$9 million includes the following works:

1. Expand the outpatients department 2. Built new operating rooms (operating theatre) 3. Build a new maternity centre, including antenatal department 4. Construct a trauma centre 5. Renovate existing staff residences 6. Build new staff houses for doctors, nurses and midwives and 7. Expand and equip existing mortuary.

== See also ==
- List of hospitals in Uganda
