= Kagando Hospital =

Ugandan private community hospital

- Location within Uganda

Geography
- Location: Kagando, Kasese District, Western Region, Uganda
- Coordinates: 00°03′47″N 29°53′53″E

Organisation
- Care system: Private
- Type: General

Services
- Beds: 250

History
- Founded: 1965

Links
- Website: Homepage
- Other links: Hospitals in Uganda; Medical education in Uganda

Kagando Hospital, also known as Kagando Mission Hospital, is a hospital in the Western Region of Uganda.

== Location ==
The hospital is located in Kagando Village, in Kasese District, Rwenzururu sub-region, at the foothills of the Rwenzori Mountains, and close to Queen Elizabeth National Park. Its location is approximately 117 kilometres (73 mi), by road, southwest of Fort Portal Regional Referral Hospital.

This is about 153 kilometres (95 mi), by road, northwest of Mbarara Regional Referral Hospital. The coordinates of Kagando Mission Hospital are 0°03'47.0"N, 29°53'53.0"E (Latitude:0.063056; Longitude:29.898069).

== Overview ==
Kagando Hospital is a rural community hospital, owned and administered by Kagando Rural Development Center (KARUDEC), a Christian missionary NGO that also owns and manages Kagando School of Nursing and Midwifery and other community outreach programs in the area. KARUDEC is affiliated with the Church of Uganda. The hospital has 250 beds and averages about 20,000 annual outpatient visits and about 18,000 annual inpatient admissions. The professional staff includes: 2 surgeons, 2 physicians, one anesthesiologist, one physiotherapist and a number of nurses and midwives.

Every morning at 8 am in the KARUDEC Chapel, there is a service for all doctors, nurses, nursing students and medical students, in which the hospital patients and local issues are prayed for. After the church service, everyone goes to do their work. Kagando hospital is a favorite choice for medical students in the Ugandan medical schools and foreign medical students who may volunteer to spend their elective (part of their training which involves work overseas) at Kagando.

In April 2018, Kagando Hospital joined the list of hospitals in Africa that have adopted Stre@mline Health for management of its hospital processes. All departments of the hospital including registration, triage, consultation, laboratory, pharmacy, stores, finance and administration will use Stre@mline. Stre@mline Health is a well suited Electronic Medical Records for Africa. The hospital is also looking forward to adopting the insurance model that is in built into Stre@mline Health. This will be great for helping very poor communities to access high quality health care.

== History ==
The hospital was established in 1965, by the African Inland Missionaries. In the beginning, it treated primarily patients afflicted with leprosy. Today, the specialty wards at the hospital include the following:

1. Pediatric Ward 2. Male Medical Ward 3. Female Medical Ward 4. Male Surgical Ward 5. Female Surgical Ward 6. Maternity Ward 7. Leprosy Ward 8. Tuberculosis Ward and 9. Neonatal Unit.

== Community Outreach ==
In response to the needs of the community, the hospital established outreach programs, including the following:

Kagando School of Nursing and Midwifery was established in 1965 to respond to the shortage of nurses and midwives in the community. Today, student capacity of nearly 250 students There was a severe outbreak of cholera in 1978, following which, a community-based healthcare project was established, which is involved in malaria control, water supply and sanitation.

Due to increasing malnutrition in the community, particularly among children, an agricultural extension program was started in 1981. Today, those activities consist of an Agriculture Extension Program, including a KARUDEC Farm on the 35 acres (14 ha) campus.

A chaplaincy at the centre of all the programmes. The Kagando Chaplainncy is under the South Rwenzori Diocese of the Church of Uganda.

A Microfinance program, a kindergarten and elementary school with nearly 700 pupils and a functional Adult Literacy Program were also established.

In 1986 Kagando Hospital (250 beds), and its outreach activities rebranded as Kagando Rural Development Center (KARUDEC), an NGO.

The community in KARUDEC's service area is intimately involved in the NGO's activities. The people in the community are generally poor, with limited means and often with limited formal education. Despite the odds, KARUDEC is slowly making a positive impact.

== See also ==
- List of hospitals in Uganda
