= Makerere University Hospital =

Private hospital in Uganda

- Makerere University
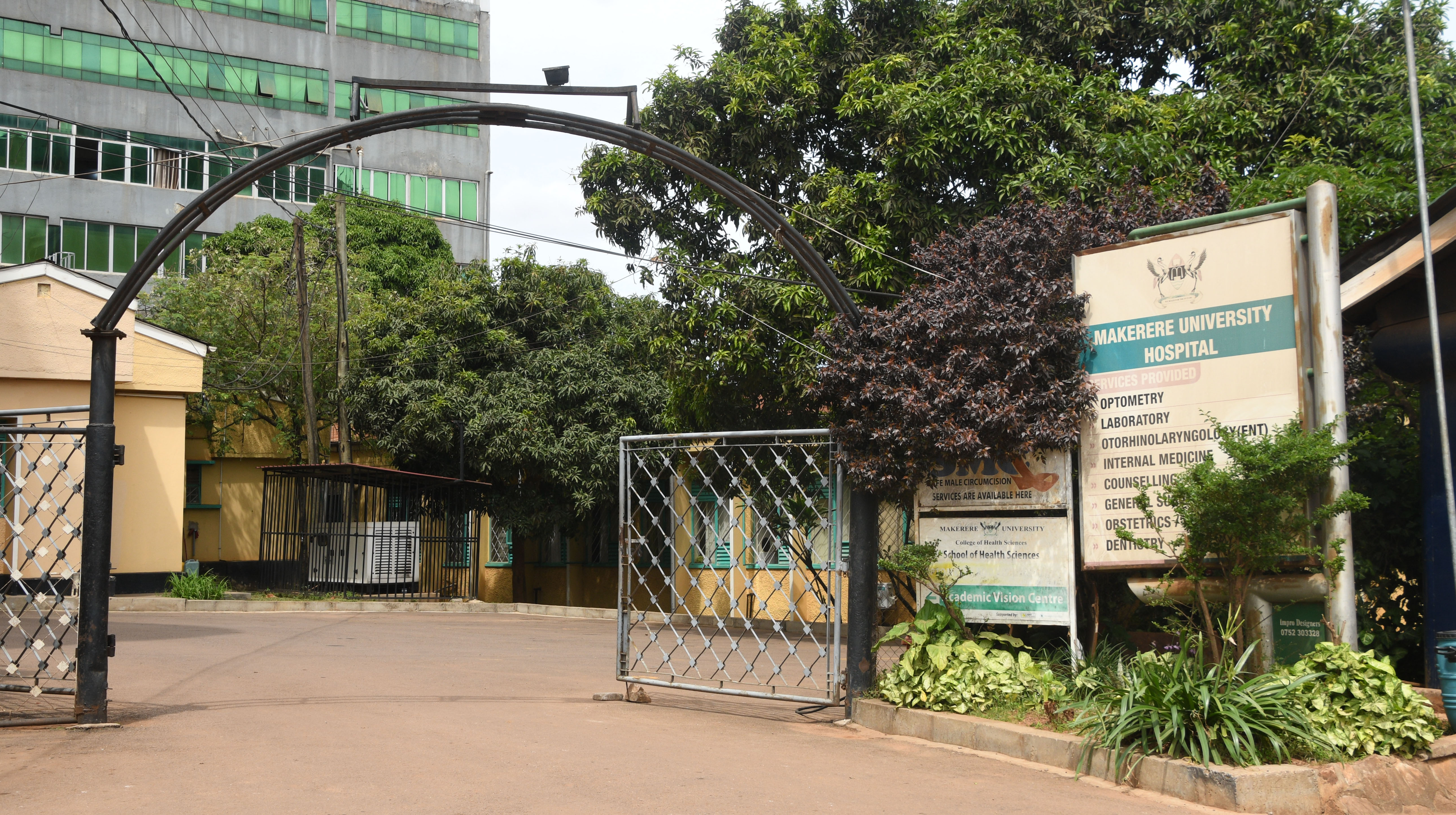

- Location within Kampala

Geography
- Location: Makerere Hill, Kampala District, Central Region, Uganda
- Coordinates: 00°19′40″N 32°34′15″E

Organisation
- Care system: Private
- Type: Community
- Affiliated university: Makerere University

Services
- Emergency department: I
- Beds: 32

History
- Founded: 1978

Links
- Website: hospital.mak.ac.ug
- Other links: Hospitals in Uganda

Makerere University Hospital, is a private community hospital, in Kampala, in the Central Region of Uganda.

== Location ==
The hospital is located on Makerere Hill, Bativa Road, off of Gaddafi Road, in Kampala Central Division, about 2.5 kilometres (2 mi), southwest of Mulago National Referral Hospital. The coordinates of Makerere University Hospital are 0°19'40.0"N, 32°34'15.0"E (Latitude:0.327771; Longitude:32.570843).

== Overview ==
The 32-bed hospital serves both outpatients and inpatients. It caters to Makerere University staff and students, and the community around.

== Departments ==
The hospital also has the following departments:

1. Clinical Medicine

2. Imaging Department

3. Laboratory Department

4. Optometry Department

5. Nursing Department

6. Medical Records Department

7. Ambulance & Evacuation

8. Dental School & Hospital

== History ==
Prior to 1972, the university maintained a health post known as Makerere University Students Health Service or Sick Bay at the current location of Makerere University Police Post. In 1972, when Idi Amin expelled the Ugandan Asians, the university acquired the premises formerly known as Nile Nursing Home. The university Sick Bay relocated to the new premises. On 16 February 1978, President Idi Amin visited the Sick Bay and he crowned it the Hospital status; thus the name Makerere University Hospital. As of October 2020, the hospital had inpatient capacity of 32 beds.

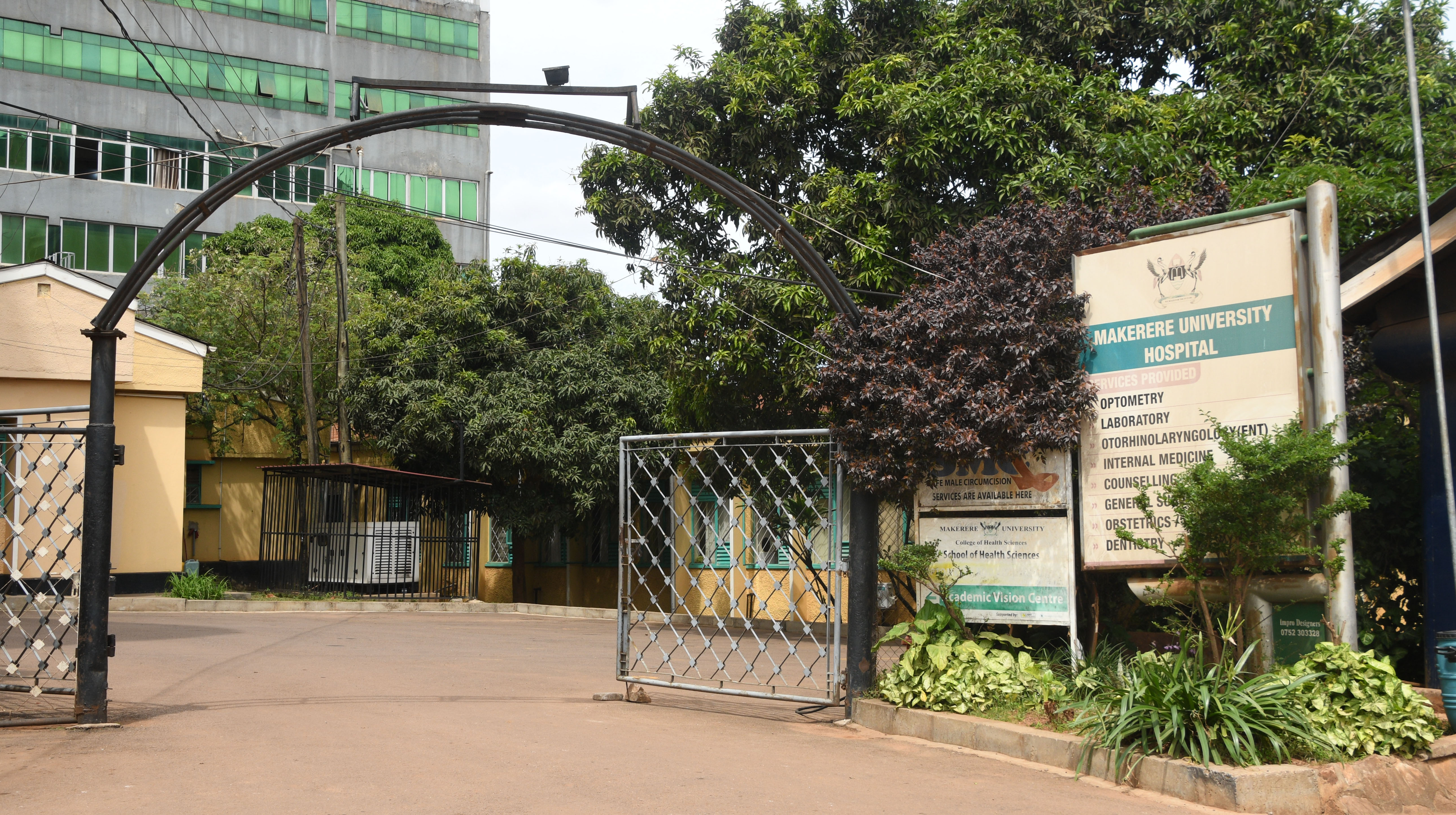
Makerere university hospital 3.jpg

== See also ==
- List of hospitals in Uganda
