= Kampala Medical Chambers Hospital =

Private hospital in Uganda

Geography
- Location: 73 Buganda Road, Kampala, Central Region, Uganda
- Coordinates: 00°19′02″N 32°34′36″E

Organisation
- Care system: Private
- Type: General

Services
- Emergency department: I

History
- Opened: 2014; 11 years ago

Links
- Other links: Hospitals in Uganda

Kampala Medical Chambers Hospital (KMCH), is a private hospital in Uganda.

== Location ==
The hospital is located at 73 Buganda Road, on Nakasero Hill, in the Central Division of Kampala, Uganda's capital city. This is approximately 3 kilometres (2 mi) south of Mulago National Referral Hospital. The coordinates of Kampala Medical Chambers Hospital are: 0°19'30.0"N 32°34'31.0"E (Latitude:0.325000; Longitude:32.575278).

== Overview ==
Prior to 2014, three specialized doctors; Romano Byaruhanga, Joseph Turyabahika and Wilson Were, established a consultation clinic at 14A Buganda Road, in the center of Kampala, which they named Kampala Medical Chambers Clinic. In 2014, following the completion of a new multi-storey building (Jowiro House) at 73 Buganda Road, the clinic relocated to the new premises and began to admit inpatients, although it continued to attend to outpatients. The new hospital complex was named Kampala Medical Chambers Hospital. Kampala Medical Chambers Hospital is a member of the International Health Network, a health maintenance organisation The hospital and clinic played a role in the introduction of the menstrual cup to Ugandan patients.

== Hospital services ==
The following services are on offer at Kampala Medical Chambers Hospital, as of November 2020: 1. Causality Department with Ambulance Services 2. Internal Medicine 3. Pediatrics 4. Endoscopy 5. Maternity and Family Planning (including Prenatal Care) 6. General Medical Care including wellness examinations 7. Obstetrics and Gynecology 8. General Surgery and 9. Dental Services.

== See also ==
- List of hospitals in Uganda
