= Galilee Community General Jewish Hospital of Uganda =

Community hospital in Kampala, Uganda

Galilee Community General Hospital

Geography
- Location: Masanafu, Sentema Road, Lubaga Division, Kampala, Uganda
- Coordinates: 00°19′54″N 32°32′09″E

Organisation
- Care system: Private
- Type: Community

Services
- Emergency department: Yes (24-hour A&E)
- Beds: 50

History
- Opened: 2009

Links
- Website: galilee-medicare.org
- Lists: Hospitals in Uganda

Galilee Community General Hospital of Uganda (also known as GCGH) is a 50-bed community hospital in the Masanafu neighborhood, in Lubaga Division, in Kampala, the capital and largest city in the country.

== Background ==
The hospital is a non-profit community institution with ties to the local communities in Uganda. It is one of several private community hospitals operating in Kampala's western suburbs, serving a predominantly low-income urban population.

== Services ==
As of 2016, the hospital offered inpatient and outpatient services across several departments including general medicine and surgery. Its 50-bed capacity places it in the category of a community-level general hospital under Uganda's health system tier classification.

== Location ==
The hospital is located in Masanafu, off Sentema Road, in northwestern Kampala, about 9 kilometres (6 mi) west of Mulago National Referral Hospital. The coordinates of Galilee Community Hospital are 0°19'54.0"N, 32°32'09.0"E (Latitude:0.331669; Longitude:32.535836).

== See also ==
- List of hospitals in Uganda
- Mulago National Specialised Hospital
- Mulago Women's Referral Hospital
- Healthcare in Uganda
- Lubaga Division
