= Nakasongola Military Hospital =

Military hospital in Uganda

- Uganda Ministry of Defence and Uganda People's Defence Force

Geography
- Location: Nakasongola, Nakasongola District, Central Region, Uganda
- Coordinates: 01°23′28″N 32°29′53″E

Organisation
- Care system: Public
- Type: General
- Affiliated university: UPDF, Makerere University Walter Reed Project

Services
- Emergency department: III

History
- Founded: 1986

Links
- Other links: Hospitals in Uganda

Nakasongola Military Hospital is a military hospital in Uganda. It is the only accredited hospital in Nakasongola District.

== Location ==
The hospital is located near the town of Nakasongola, in Nakasongola District, in the Central Region of Uganda, approximately 96 kilometres (60 mi), north of Bombo Military Hospital. This is approximately 126 kilometres (78 mi) north of Mulago National Referral Hospital.

== Overview ==
The hospital serves as the primary healthcare facility for the various units of the UPDF occupying the 20 square miles (13,000 acres) military complex in the district, including:

- Uganda Air Force Academy
- Nakasongola Air Forces Base
- Nakasongola Airport
- Uganda Special Forces Group
- Luweero Industries Limited
- Uganda Air Defense Division
- Uganda Marine Unit

Nakasongola Hospital is working in collaboration with the University of Connecticut, with funding from PEPFAR, to develop an anti-retroviral adherence intervention program.

== See also ==
- List of hospitals in Uganda
- Uganda People's Defence Force
