= Masindi General Hospital =

Hospital in Masindi in Uganda

- Uganda Ministry of Health
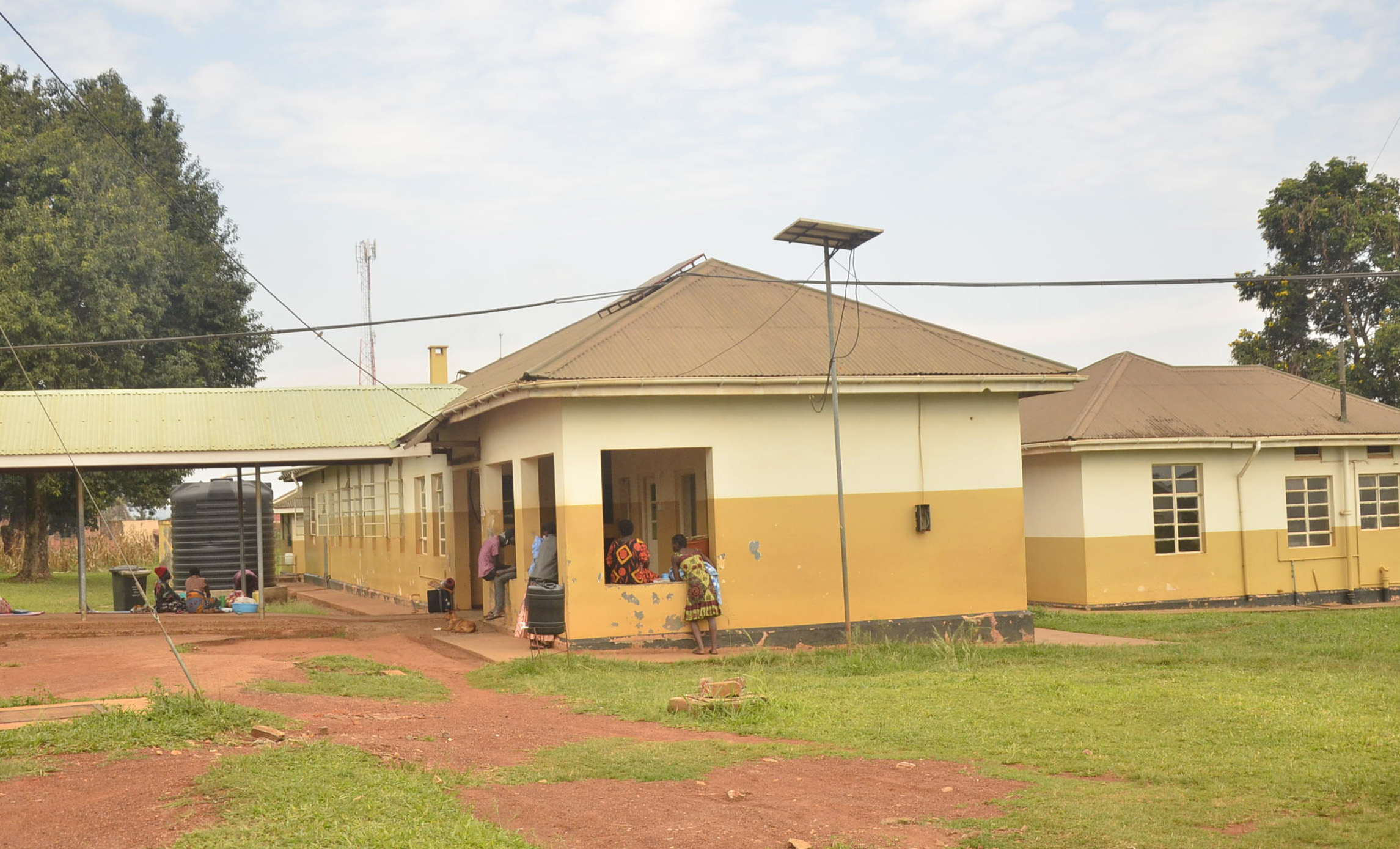
- Masindi General Hospital (2022)

- Location within Uganda

Geography
- Location: Masindi, Western Region, Uganda
- Coordinates: 01°41′07″N 31°42′48″E

Organisation
- Care system: Public
- Type: General

Services
- Emergency department: I
- Beds: 160

History
- Founded: 1922

Links
- Other links: Hospitals in Uganda

Masindi General Hospital, also Masindi Government Hospital or Masindi Hospital, is a hospital in the Western Region of Uganda.

== Location ==
The hospital is located in the town of Masindi, in Masindi District, in Bunyoro sub-region, about 56 kilometres (35 mi), by road, northeast of Hoima Regional Referral Hospital. The coordinates of Masindi General Hospital are:01°41'07.0"N, 31°42'48.0"E (Latitude:1.685282; Longitude:31.713337).

== Overview ==
The hospital was built in 1922, as a health aid post of the workers of the East African Railways. In 1935, it was acquired by the colonial government and developed into a Health Center IV facility. In 1965 it was handed over to the government of Uganda. In 1988, it was upgraded to a 100-bed general hospital. 54 gynecology beds were added in 2008, to bring the bed capacity to 154. The bed capacity as at January 2013, was given as 160.

Patients served come from the districts of Masindi, Buliisa, Nakasongola, Nakaseke, Hoima and Nebbi. Some patients come from as far away as South Sudan and eastern DR Congo.

== See also ==
- List of hospitals in Uganda
