= Nyenga Mission Hospital =

Private faith-based, non-profit, community hospital in Uganda

St. Francis Hospital Nyegaa
- Roman Catholic Diocese of Lugazi

Geography
- Location: Nyenga, Buikwe District, Central Region, Uganda
- Coordinates: 00°23′02″N 33°09′08″E

Organisation
- Care system: Community hospital
- Type: General

Services
- Beds: 75

History
- Founded: 1932; 94 years ago

Links
- Other links: Hospitals in Uganda; Medical education in Uganda

Nyenga Mission Hospital, whose formal name is St. Francis Hospital Nyenga, but is commonly referred to as Nyenga Hospital, is a non-profit, community hospital in Uganda. It is owned and operated by the Roman Catholic Diocese of Lugazi.

== Location ==
The hospital is in the town of Nyenga in Buikwe District in Uganda's Central Region. This is approximately 15 kilometres (9 mi), by road, west of the Jinja Regional Referral Hospital, in the city of Jinja.

Nyenga Hospital is located approximately 90 kilometres (56 mi) east of the Mulago National Referral Hospital, in the city of Kampala, the capital of Uganda. The geographical coordinates of Nyenga Hospital are 0°23'02.0"N 33°09'08.0"E 0.383889, 33.152222 (Latitude:0.383894; Longitude:33.152220).

== Overview ==
St. Francis Hospital Nyenga is a rural community hospital that serves Buikwe District and people from parts of the neighboring districts of Kayunga, Jinja, Buvuma, and Mukono. The hospital was founded in 1932 as a leprosy treatment hospital by Mother Kevin, a nurse who was also a nun of the Franciscan Missionary Sisters for Africa. The hospital was later turned over to the Roman Catholic Diocese of Lugazi, whereupon it began to treat other diseases. The hospital is the teaching hospital for the St. Francis Nyenga School of Nursing. According to a September 2010 published report, the hospital had challenges of under-staffing and vandalism.

== Hospital operations ==
As of December 2019, Nyenga Mission Hospital attended to an average of 20,102 outpatients annually. Inpatient admissions averaged 4,089 annually, with a bed occupancy rate of 28 percent. At the time, maternity deliveries averaged 404 annually, with a caesarian section rate of 37.7 percent.

== See also ==
- List of hospitals in Uganda
