= Murchison Bay Hospital =

Corrections facility general hospital

- Uganda Prisons Department

Geography
- Location: Luzira, Nakawa Division, Kampala, Central Region, Uganda
- Coordinates: 00°17′58″N 32°38′30″E

Organisation
- Care system: Prison
- Type: General

Services
- Emergency department: III

History
- Founded: 1962

Links
- Other links: Hospitals in Uganda

Murchison Bay Hospital is a hospital in the Central Region of Uganda. This facility serves as the national referral hospital for prisoners in the Uganda Prisons Service.

== Location ==
The hospital is located on the premises of Luzira Maximum Security Prison, in the neighborhood of Luzira, in Nakawa Division of Kampala, the capital of Uganda and its largest city, approximately 9 kilometres (6 mi) south-east of the city's central business district. This is approximately 12 kilometres (7 mi) by road, southeast of Mulago National Referral Hospital. The coordinates of the prison, where this hospital is located are 00°17'58.0"N, 32°38'30.0"E (Latitude:0.299441; Longitude:32.641658).

== Overview ==
This hospital serves the inmate population of Luzira Maximum Prison. Some of the ailments treated include HIV/AIDS, tuberculosis and mental illnesses. In January 2014, the hospital expanded services by opening a new maternity wing. Cases that cannot be handled at this hospital are referred to Mulago National Referral Hospital.

== See also ==
- List of hospitals in Uganda
