= St. Joseph's Hospital Maracha =

Community hospital in Uganda

- Uganda Catholic Medical Bureau

Geography
- Location: Ovijo Village, Nyadri sub-county, Maracha District, Northern Region , Uganda
- Coordinates: 03°14′17″N 30°55′18″E

Organisation
- Care system: Private
- Type: Community

Services
- Emergency department: I
- Beds: 204

History
- Opened: 1953

Links
- Website: www.stjosephshospitalmaracha.org
- Lists: Hospitals in Uganda

St. Joseph's Hospital Maracha, also Maracha Hospital, is a hospital in Maracha District, in the West Nile sub-region of the Northern Region of Uganda. It is a private, community hospital, serving the district of Maracha and surrounding communities.

== Location ==
The hospital is located in Nyadri sub-county, in Maracha District, off of the Vurra–Arua–Koboko–Oraba Road (Kaya Highway), approximately 31 kilometres (19 mi), north of Arua Regional Referral Hospital, in the city of Arua. Maracha Hospital is located approximately 282 kilometres (175 mi) northwest of Gulu Regional Referral Hospital, in the city of Gulu. The geographical coordinates of St. Joseph's Hospital Maracha are:03°14'17.0"N, 30°55'18.0"E (Latitude:3.238056; Longitude:30.921667).

== Overview ==
The hospital is a private, non-profit, community hospital owned by the Roman Catholic Diocese of Arua and is accredited by the Uganda Catholic Medical Bureau. The planned capacity is 204 in-patient beds.

St. Joseph's Hospital Maraca was established in 1952, as an aid post. In 1953 is converted to a dispensary, and later a maternity centre, operated by the Comboni Missionary Sisters. The institution became a fully fledged hospital in 1972. The hospital was handed over to the Roman Catholic Diocese of Arua, in 1985. The diocese manages the hospital through a Board of Governors.

== Hospital operations ==
As of December 2019, the hospital attended to 16,626 outpatients annually, on average. At that time, it admitted 6,145 inpatients, annually on average, with a bed occupancy ratio of 70.5 percent. There were 840 maternal deliveries every year on average, with a caesarian section ratio of 41.9 percent. At that time, patient user fees accounted for approximately 31.7 percent of total annual hospital income.

== See also ==
- Hospitals in Uganda
