= St. Francis Hospital Nkokonjeru =

Private non-profit community hospital in Uganda

Nkokonjeru Hospital
- Uganda Catholic Medical Bureau

Geography
- Location: Nkokonjeru, Buikwe District, Central Region, Uganda
- Coordinates: 00°13′39″N 32°55′39″E

Organisation
- Care system: Private
- Type: Community

Services
- Emergency department: I
- Beds: 100

History
- Founded: 1926

Links
- Website: www.nkokonjeruhospital.org
- Other links: Hospitals in Uganda; Medical education in Uganda

St. Francis Hospital Nkokonjeru, commonly referred to as Nkokonjeru Hospital, is a private, non-profit, community hospital in Uganda. It is owned by the Roman Catholic Diocese of Lugazi.

== Location ==
The hospital is located in the town of Nkokonjeru, in Buikwe District, in the Central Region of Uganda. It is located approximately 50 kilometres (31 mi), by road, southwest of Jinja Regional Referral Hospital, in the city of Jinja. This is about 58 kilometres (36 mi), by road, southeast of Mulago National Referral Hospital, in Kampala, the capital of Uganda and its largest city. Nkokonjeru is located about 27 kilometres (17 mi), southwest of Buikwe, the location of the district headquarters.

== Overview ==
Nkokonjeru Hospital is a private, non-profit, community hospital, owned by the Roman Catholic Diocese of Lugazi. It is administered by the Little Sisters of St. Francis. It has a bed capacity of 60. The hospital serves a rural population of approximately 200,000, in Buikwe District, and nearby parts of Mukono District.

The hospital is a member of the Uganda Catholic Medical Bureau. It attends to an average of 13,381 outpatients annually and admits an average of 2,061 patients annually. It averages 657 maternal deliveries every year, with a caesarian rate of 23.3 percent. Its bed occupancy ratio averages 26.7 percent.

== History ==
In 1926, Mother Kevin-Kearney started a dispensary which developed into the current hospital. In the beginning, emphasis was placed on educating the local population in maternal and child health. In 1932, a school of nursing was established. In 1959, the Little Sisters of St. Francis took over the management of the then maternity centre and dispensary. In 1981 the institution received full accreditation as a hospital.

== See also ==
- List of hospitals in Uganda
- Roman Catholicism in Uganda
