= Pallisa General Hospital =

Public hospital in Uganda

- Uganda Ministry of Health

Geography
- Location: Pallisa, Pallisa District, Eastern Region, Uganda
- Coordinates: 01°10′34″N 33°42′39″E

Organisation
- Care system: Public
- Type: General

Services
- Emergency department: I
- Beds: 109

History
- Founded: 1970

Links
- Lists: Hospitals in Uganda
- Other links: Hospitals in Uganda

Pallisa General Hospital, also Pallisa Hospital, is a hospital in Pallisa Town, Pallisa District, in the Eastern Region of Uganda. It is a public hospital, owned by the Ugandan Government and is administered by Pallisa District Local Government.

== Location ==
The hospital is located in the central business district of the town of Pallisa, about 55 kilometres (34 mi) northwest of Mbale Regional Referral Hospital, in the city of Mbale. The coordinates of Pallisa General Hospital are: 01°10'34.0"N, 33°42'39.0"E (Latitude:1.176111; Longitude:33.710833.

== Overview ==
The hospital was built in the second half of the 20th century. Since it was commissioned, the hospital infrastructure has not received any refurbishment or re-equipping. The buildings need renovation and remodeling. As of January 2021, the hospital is reported to have capacity of 109 beds.

As of July 2021, Pallisa General Hospital does not have an intensive care unit (ICU) or an oxygen generating unit. However the facility had treated and discharged over 60 COVID-19 patients, by the first week of July 2021.

== Renovations ==
In August 2010, the Government of Uganda signed a credit agreement, with the International Development Association, an arm of the World Bank, in the amount of US$130 million. The resources were meant to be used to construct and equip a number of General Hospitals and two Regional Referral Hospitals in Uganda. Pallisa General Hospital was on the list of hospitals to be renovated. The project, which started on 11 February 2011, was concluded on 30 June 2015. However, Pallisa Hospital was not renovated as originally planned. As of December 2019, those planned renovations had not been carried out yet.

== See also ==
- List of hospitals in Uganda
