= Lwala Hospital Kaberamaido =

Community hospital in Uganda

- Roman Catholic Diocese of Soroti

Geography
- Location: Lwala Village, Kaberamaido District Eastern Region, Uganda
- Coordinates: 01°51′33″N 33°16′42″E

Organisation
- Type: Community
- Religious affiliation: Catholic church

Services
- Standards: Uganda Catholic Medical Bureau standards
- Emergency department: Level I trauma center
- Beds: 100

History
- Founded: 1936

Links
- Lists: Hospitals in Uganda

Lwala Hospital Kaberamaido is a hospital in Lwala Village, in Kaberamaido District, in the Eastern Region of Uganda. It is a private, community hospital, serving the district of Kaberamaido and surrounding communities.

== Location ==
The hospital is located in Otuboi sub-county, in Kaberamaido District, off of the Soroti–Dokolo–Lira Road, approximately 56 kilometres (35 mi), northwest of Soroti Regional Referral Hospital, in the city of Soroti. Lwala Hospital is located about 72 kilometres (45 mi), by road, southeast of Lira Regional Referral Hospital, in the city of Lira.

== Overview ==
Lwala Hospital is a private, non-profit, community hospital owned by the Roman Catholic Diocese of Soroti and is accredited by the Uganda Catholic Medical Bureau. The original planned capacity was 100 in-patient beds.

Among the challenges that Lwala Hospital faces are the following: 1. Dilapidated infrastructure, insufficient and overworked personnel, insufficient medical supplies, demoralized staff and low remunerations, among other challenges. 2. The hospital lies in the Teso sub-region, which together with the neighboring Lango sub-region are endemic areas for Human African Trypanosomiasis, also known as sleeping sickness, a vector-borne parasitic infection that is transmitted between humans, domestic and some wild animals.

== Hospital operations ==
The hospital started as a sub-hospital health unit in 1936. In 1992, it received regulatory approval to operate as a hospital. As of December 2019, the hospital attended to 6,000 outpatients annually, on average. At that time, it admitted 3,553 inpatients, annually on average, with a bed occupancy ratio of 56.3 percent. There were 573 maternal deliveries every year on average, with a caesarian section ratio of 16.7 percent. At that time, patient user fees accounted for approximately 38.3 percent of total annual hospital income.

== See also ==
- Kaberamaido District
