= List of hospitals in Uganda =

The largest state-owned hospital in Uganda is Mulago Hospital in Kampala with around 1,500 beds. It was built in 1962.

Ian Clarke, a physician and missionary from Northern Ireland, built the 200-bed International Hospital Kampala, which was the first International Organization for Standardization-certified hospital in the country.

According to a report published in 2009, the distribution of healthcare facilities and funding heavily favored urban centers, with 70 percent of physicians and 40 percent of nurses and midwives based in urban areas, where they served only 12 percent of Uganda's population.

== National referral hospitals ==
- Butabika National Referral Hospital
- Mulago National Referral Hospital

== Specialized government hospitals ==
- Mulago National Specialised Hospital
- Mulago Women's Referral Hospital
- Uganda Cancer Institute
- Uganda Heart Institute

== Regional referral hospitals ==
- Arua Regional Referral Hospital
- Entebbe Regional Referral Hospital.
- Fort Portal Regional Referral Hospital
- Gulu Regional Referral Hospital
- Hoima Regional Referral Hospital
- Jinja Regional Referral Hospital
- Kabale Regional Referral Hospital
- Kayunga Regional Referral Hospital
- Lira Regional Referral Hospital
- Masaka Regional Referral Hospital
- Mbale Regional Referral Hospital
- Mbarara Regional Referral Hospital
- Moroto Regional Referral Hospital
- Mubende Regional Referral Hospital
- Old Mulago Hospital
- Soroti Regional Referral Hospital

== District hospitals ==
- Abim General Hospital
- Adjumani General Hospital
- Anaka General Hospital
- Apac General Hospital
- Atutur General Hospital
- Bududa General Hospital
- Bugiri General Hospital
- Bukwo General Hospital
- Bundibugyo General Hospital
- Busolwe General Hospital
- Gombe General Hospital, Gombe, Butambala District
- Iganga General Hospital
- Itojo Hospital
- Kaabong General Hospital
- Kagadi General Hospital
- Kalisizo General Hospital
- Kamuli General Hospital
- Kapchorwa General Hospital
- Kasese Municipal Health Centre III
- Katakwi General Hospital
- Kawolo General Hospital
- Kiboga General Hospital
- Kiryandongo General Hospital
- Kitagata General Hospital
- Kitgum Hospital
- Kyenjojo General Hospital
- Lyantonde General Hospital
- Masafu General Hospital
- Masindi General Hospital
- Mityana Hospital
- Moyo General Hospital
- Mpigi Hospital
- Mukono General Hospital
- Nakaseke General Hospital
- Nebbi General Hospital
- Pallisa General Hospital
- Rakai General Hospital
- Tororo General Hospital
- Yumbe General Hospital

== Other government hospitals ==
- Arua Regional Cancer Centre
- Buwenge General Hospital, Buwenge, Jinja District
- Bwera General Hospital
- Entebbe General Hospital
- Gulu Regional Cancer Centre
- Iran–Uganda Hospital
- Kawempe General Hospital, Kawempe, Kampala
- Kiruddu General Hospital, Makindye Division, Kampala
- Mbale Regional Cancer Centre
- Mbarara Regional Cancer Centre
- Naguru General Hospital, Naguru, Kampala

== Non-government non-profit hospitals ==
- Angal Hospital
- Bishop Ceaser Asili Memorial Hospital
- Buluba Hospital
- Bwindi Community Hospital
- CoRSU Rehabilitation Hospital
- CURE Children's Hospital of Uganda
- Entebbe Children's Surgical Hospital
- Galilee Community General Jewish Hospital of Uganda
- Hoima Specialized Referral Hospital (in development)
- Holy Family Hospital Nyapea
- Holy Innocents Children's Hospital
- Ishaka Adventist Hospital
- Kagando Hospital
- Kalongo Hospital
- Kamuli Mission Hospital
- Kilembe Mines Hospital
- Kisiizi Hospital
- Kisubi Hospital
- Kitojo Hospital
- Kitovu Hospital
- Kiwoko Hospital
- Kuluva Hospital
- Kumi Hospital
- Lacor Hospital
- Lubaga Hospital
- Lwala Hospital Kaberamaido
- Makerere University Hospital
- Matany Hospital
- Mayanja Memorial Hospital
- Mengo Hospital
- Mildmay Uganda Hospital
- Mutolere Hospital
- Naggalama Hospital
- Ngora Hospital
- Nkokonjeru Hospital
- Nkozi Hospital
- Nsambya Hospital
- Nyenga Mission Hospital
- Pope John’s Hospital Aber
- Restoration Gateway Hospital
- Ruharo Mission Hospital
- Rushere Community Hospital
- St. Charles Lwanga Buikwe Hospital
- St. Francis Hospital Nkokonjeru
- St. Francis Hospital Nyenga
- St. Joseph's Hospital Kitgum
- St. Joseph’s Hospital Maracha
- Uganda Martyrs’ Hospital Ibanda
- Villa Maria Hospital
- Virika Hospital
- Whisper's Magical Children's Hospital

== Private for-profit hospitals ==
- Aga Khan University Hospital, Kampala (in development)
- Bamu Hospital Limited, Mateete, Sembabule District
- Bethany Women's and Family Hospital, Luzira
- Case Medical Centre
- Healingway Diagnostic & Fertility Centre, Kololo, Kampala
- International Hospital Kampala, Namuwongo, Kampala
- International Specialized Hospital of Uganda
- Kampala Hospital, Kololo, Kampala
- Kampala International University Teaching Hospital, Bushenyi
- Kampala Medical Chambers Hospital
- Kibuli Hospital, Kibuli, Kampala
- Kumi Orthopaedic Center, Kumi
- Le Memorial Hospital, Lweza, Wakiso District
- Life Line International Hospital, Zana, Wakiso District
- Makerere University Teaching Hospital, Katalemwa, Wakiso District (in development)
- Mbarara Community Hospital, Mbarara
- Medipal International Hospital, Kololo, Kampala
- Mukwaya General Hospital, Nsambya, Kampala
- Nakasero Hospital, Nakasero, Kampala
- Nile International Hospital
- Norvik Hospital, Nakasero, Kampala
- Old Kampala Hospital, Kampala Hill, Kampala
- Paragon Hospital, Bugoloobi, Kampala
- TMR International Hospital Naalya, Kampala
- UMC Victoria Hospital, Bukoto, Kampala
- Women's Hospital International and Fertility Centre, Bukoto, Kampala

== Security forces hospitals ==
- Bombo Military Hospital, Bombo
- Entebbe Military Hospital, Entebbe
- Gulu Military Hospital, Gulu
- Mbuya Military Hospital, Mbuya
- Murchison Bay Hospital, Luzira
- Nakasongola Military Hospital, Nakasongola
