= Nyenga, Uganda =

Urban division of Njeru City, Uganda

Nyenga
- Location in Uganda
- Coordinates: 00°22′48″N 33°09′00″E
- Country: Uganda
- Region: Central Uganda
- District: Buikwe District
- Municipality: Njeru Municipality
- Elevation: 4,042 ft (1,232 m)

Population (2020 Estimate)
  - Total: 55,600

Nyenga is an urban division of one of the municipalities in Buikwe District, in the Central Region of Uganda. Nyenga Division is one of the three divisions of the city of Njeru. The other two divisions are Wakisi Division and Njeru Division.

== Location ==
Nyenga is located in Njeru Municipality, approximately 7 kilometres (4 mi), by road, south of Njeru Division, the central business district of the municipality. The coordinates of Nyenga, Uganda are:0°22'48.0"N; 33°09'00.0"E (Latitude:0.3800; Longitude:33.1500). Nyenga is situated at an average altitude of 1,232 metres (4,042 ft), above mean sea level.

== Population ==
In 2015, Uganda Bureau of Statistics (UBOS) estimated the population of Nyenga Division at 50,400. In 2020, the population agency estimated the mid-year population of Nyenga at 55,600 inhabitants. Of these, 28,200 (50.7 percent) were females and 27,400 (49.3 percent) were males. UBOS calculated that the population of Nyenga increased at an average rate of 2.0 percent annually, between 2015 and 2020.

Historical population
Year	Pop.	±%
2015	50,400	—
2020	55,600	+10.3%

== Points of interest ==
The following points of interest lie within or near Nyenga: (a) Nyenga Roman Catholic Church (b) Nyenga Mission Hospital, also St. Francis Hospital Nyenga, is a 75-bed community hospital that was founded in 1932 as a leprosarium. Owned by the Roman Catholic Diocese of Lugazi. (c) Saint Joseph Minor Seminary Nyenga (d) Saint Francis School of Nursing and Midwifery and (e) Nyenga Children’s Home In Uganda, an extended family for destitute children.

The Mukono–Kyetume–Katosi–Nyenga Road passes through Nyenga in a general southwest to northeast direction on the way to the Source of the Nile Bridge.

== See also ==
- Buikwe
- Buikwe District
- Hospitals in Uganda
- Central Region, Uganda
