= Entebbe General Hospital =

- Uganda Ministry of Health

Geography
- Location: Entebbe, Wakiso District, Central Region, Uganda
- Coordinates: 00°03′50″N 32°28′18″E

Organisation
- Care system: Public
- Type: General

Services
- Emergency department: I
- Beds: 200

History
- Founded: 2016

Links
- Other links: Hospitals in Uganda; Medical education in Uganda

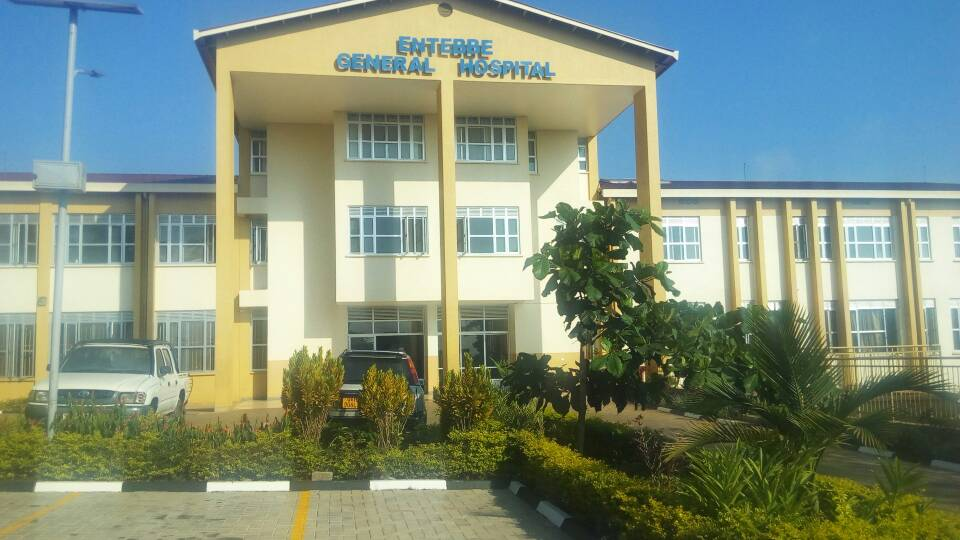

Entebbe General Hospital, commonly known as Entebbe Hospital, is a hospital in the town of Entebbe, in the Central Region of Uganda.

== Location ==
The hospital is located in the central business district of the town of Entebbe, in Wakiso District, approximately 44 kilometres (27 mi), by road, southwest of Mulago National Referral Hospital, the largest hospital in the country, located in Kampala, Uganda's capital and largest city. The coordinates of the hospital are:0°03'50.0"N, 32°28'18.0"E (Latitude:0.063874; Longitude:32.471655).

== Overview ==
Entebbe General Hospital is a public hospital funded by the Uganda Ministry of Health. Originally built by the British colonialists in the 20th century as Entebbe Grade B Hospital, the facility was closed temporarily in December 2013. Between December 2013 and May 2016, the hospital was rebuilt and expanded from 100 to 200 beds at a cost of US$7 million (about UGX:23.2 billion), donated by the World Bank. The new facility has a private fee-for-service wing and a public, free-service wing. Other services include pediatrics, radiology, laboratory, maternity, immunization, general surgery, internal medicine, orthopedics and operating rooms. Patients served come from Wakiso District, Mpigi District, Entebbe Town, and the neighboring islands in Lake Victoria.

== Recent developments ==
The hospital featured prominently during the two COVID-19 pandemic waves in Uganda, one in 2020 and another 2021. According to Dr Moses Muwanga, the medical director, at one time during the second wave, the 200-bed hospital had 160 Covid-19 inpatients. The Daily Monitor newspaper referred to the hospital as Entebbe Regional Referral Hospital.

== See also ==
- List of hospitals in Uganda
