= Bishop Ceaser Asili Memorial Hospital =

Private community hospital in Uganda

- Roman Catholic Diocese of Kasana-Luweero

Geography
- Location: Luweero, Luweero District, Central Region, Uganda
- Coordinates: 00°49′32″N 32°30′04″E

Organisation
- Care system: Community Hospital
- Type: General

Services
- Emergency department: I
- Beds: ~ 100

History
- Founded: 2006; 20 years ago

Links
- Other links: Hospitals in Uganda

Bishop Ceaser Asili Memorial Hospital, also Bishop Asili Hospital, is a community hospital in Uganda. It is owned and operated by the Roman Catholic Diocese of Kasana–Luweero.

== Location ==
The hospital is located in the town of Luweero, in Luweero District, in the Buganda Region of Uganda. This location is approximately 60 kilometres (37 mi), by road, north of Mulago National Referral Hospital, in Kampala, the capital and largest city of Uganda. The coordinates of the hospital are 0°49'32.0"N, 32°30'04.0"E (Latitude:0.825556; Longitude:32.501111).

== Overview ==
Bishop Ceaser Asili Memorial Hospital, is an urban community hospital, that serves the population of Luweero District. It is the only General Hospital in the district. Due to the good quality of services rendered, many patients travel from other parts of the country to seek services at this facility.

== History ==
The hospital was founded as Bishop Asili Health Centre, named after the late Bishop Cesare Asili (20 September 1924 – 12 October 1988), who served as the Bishop of the Roman Catholic Diocese of Lira from 20 September 1968 until his death, 20 years later.

In 2006, the clinic was affiliated with the Just Like My Child Foundation (JLMCF), a San Diego–based non-profit, which raised US$30,000 for a diesel generator. Later, a surgical theatre (operating room) was built, an autoclave (sterilizer) and other surgical equipment were procured and a doctor was made available.

Besides attending to the health needs of the community, JLMCF became active in the surrounding villages, building schools and working with families and community leaders to start self-sustaining farming businesses, and holding workshops to teach life-skills and mentor more than 1,300 adolescent girls in 12 villages.

In 2007, the Clinton Foundation gave the Just Like My Child Foundation to provide HIV pediatric testing through Bishop Asili Hospital. As of August 2018, the hospital provided medical and surgical therapeutic care, treatment for HIV/AIDS, prenatal, obstetric and postnatal care, as well as malaria treatment and prevention in nearly 80 neighboring villages.

JLMCF has been able to establish a community health insurance plan, serving over 18,000 individuals.

Bishop Asili Hospital is expanding rapidly. During the twelve months that ended in June 2013, the hospital treated 21,000 patients. One year later, that number doubled to 42,000. The Uganda Ministry health designated the facility as a "hospital" from "clinic", following the acquisition of a laboratory and refrigeration capabilities for blood storage.

== See also ==
- List of hospitals in Uganda
