= Kuluva Hospital =

Private non-profit community hospital in Uganda

- Church of Uganda Medical Bureau

Geography
- Location: Arua, Arua District, Northern Region, Uganda
- Coordinates: 02°56′48″N 30°55′57″E

Organisation
- Care system: Private
- Type: General

Services
- Beds: 200

History
- Founded: 1902; 124 years ago

Links
- Other links: Hospitals in Uganda

Kuluva Hospital, is a private, non-profit, community hospital in Uganda.

== Location ==
The hospital is located in the village of Kuluva, a suburb of the city of Arua, in Arua District, West Nile sub-region, in Northern Uganda. Kuluva is located about 11 kilometres (7 mi), by road, south of Arua's central business district, along the Arua-Pakwach Road. This location lies approximately 241 kilometres (150 mi), by road, west of Gulu, the largest city in Northern Uganda. The geographical coordinates of Kuluva Hospital are: 02°56'48.0"N, 30°55'57.0"E (Latitude:2.946667; Longitude:30.932500).

== Overview ==
Kuluva Hospital is a non-profit, private, community hospital owned and administered by the Church of Uganda. A small fee is charged for medical services provided, although no one is turned away for lack of payment. The hospital is a member of the Uganda Protestant Medical Bureau.

Available literature suggests that it was founded in the early 20th century (circa 1902). In addition to serving patients from communities in the West Nile sub-region of Uganda, a significant percentage of the hospital patients come from the neighboring countries of the Democratic Republic of the Congo and South Sudan. The hospital has a bed capacity of 200, with several well-established departments including:

1. Outpatients Department 2. Pediatrics Department 3. Internal Medicine Department 4. Surgery Department 5. Obstetrics & Gynecology Department and 6. Nutritional Education & Rehabilitation Department.

== See also ==
- Arua
- Arua District
- West Nile
- Northern Region, Uganda
- List of hospitals in Uganda
