= Kitojo Hospital =

Coordinates: 0.525000°N 30.276667°E

- Kitojo Integrated Development Association

Geography
- Location: Kijojo, Rwaihamba Town Council, Kabarole District, Western Region, Uganda

Organisation
- Care system: Private
- Type: General

Services
- Beds: 40

History
- Founded: 2011

Links
- Other links: Hospitals in Uganda

Kitojo Hospital, is a hospital in Uganda. Kitojo Hospital is located in Kitojo Village, near Rwaihamba trading center, in Toro sub-region, Western Uganda, about 8 kilometres (5 mi), west of Kibaale National Park.

== Location ==
Its location is approximately 25 kilometres (16 mi), by road, south of Fort Portal, the district headquarters and nearest large town. This location is approximately 326 kilometres (203 mi), by road, west of Kampala, the capital of Uganda and the largest city in that country.

== Overview ==
Kitojo Hospital is a rural hospital, serving Ruteete, Kasenda and Buheesi subcounties and Kiko town council of Western Uganda. The hospital was built, is owned and administered by Kitojo Integrated Development Association (KIDA), a community development NGO, headed by Reverend Ezra Musobozi. The 30-bed hospital cost approximately US$310,000 (775 M UGX) to build and equip.

== See also ==
- Hospitals in Uganda
- Health care in Uganda
- Toro sub-region
- Kibale National Park
- Ministry of Health (Uganda)
