= Kisubi Hospital =

- Uganda Catholic Medical Bureau

Geography
- Location: Kisubi, Wakiso District, Central Region, Uganda
- Coordinates: 00°07′20″N 32°32′13″E

Organisation
- Care system: Private
- Type: Community

Services
- Emergency department: I
- Beds: 132

History
- Founded: 1905

Links
- Website: kisubihospital.co.ug
- Other links: Hospitals in Uganda

Our Lady of Consolata Kisubi Hospital, also Our Lady of Consolation Kisubi Hospital, commonly referred to as Kisubi Hospital, is a private, non-profit, community hospital in the Central Region of Uganda. The hospital is in Kisubi in Katabi Town Council Wakiso District on Entebbe road. This is approximately 35 kilometres (22 mi), by road, south-west of Kampala, the capital and largest city of Uganda. The coordinates of Kisubi Hospital are 00°07′20″N 32°32′13″E.

== Overview ==
The hospital is owned by the Roman Catholic Archdiocese of Kampala and administered by the Sisters of Immaculate Heart of Mary Reparatrix. It has a bed capacity of 132. The hospital serves a peri-urban population in southern Busiro and Kyaddondo Counties. The hospital offers specialized services including cardiology, emergency department, outpatients department, general surgery, urology, neurosurgery, orthopedics, internal medicine, maternity services, pediatrics, and otolaryngology. It has three operating rooms, a Cardiac Catheterization Laboratory and a four-bed intensive care unit.

== History ==
In 1905, the Congregation of the Missionary Sisters of Our Lady of Africa established a health centre at Kisubi to help those suffering from sleeping sickness, which was prevalent in the area at that time. Over the next 110 years, the facility has expanded into a fully fledged hospital, with 132 beds. On four occasions, before March 2010, the hospital conducted free surgeries to patients who could not afford the cost.

In 2019, the hospital opened a new heart treatment centre, capable of performing a cardiac catheterization procedure. This cath-lab is one of the only two such labs in Uganda, as of January 2020. The other cardiac catheterization laboratory in the county is located at the Uganda Heart Institute in Mulago Hospital Complex, in Kampala.

== See also ==
- List of hospitals in Uganda
- Roman Catholicism in Uganda
