= Mateete =

- Map of Uganda showing the location of Mateete.
- Coordinates: 00°14′32″S 31°29′17″E
- Country: Uganda
- Region: Central Region, Uganda
- District: Sembabule District

Population (2011 Estimate)
  - Total: 5,000
- Time zone: UTC+3 (EAT)

Mateete is a town in the Central Region of Uganda.

== Location ==
Mateete is on the 38 kilometres (24 mi) Sembabule–Mateete–Lwensinga Road, about equidistant from Sembabule to the north, where the district headquarters are located, and Lwensinga, which lies on the Masaka–Mbarara Road, to the south. The coordinates of the town are 0°14'32.0"S, 31°29'17.0"E (Latitude:-0.242234; Longitude:31.488044).

== Overview ==
Mateete is a growing urban centre. One of the alarming developments is the high number of girls aged 15 to 18 years, engaged in the prostitution trade in the town.

== Population ==
The population of Mateete Municipality was estimated at 5,000 in 2011.

== Points of interest ==
- offices of Mateete Town Council
- Mateete central market
- headquarters of Mateete sub-county in Mawogola County
- Sembabule–Mateete–Lwensinga Road, passing through the middle of town in a general north/south direction.
- Bamu Hospital - a private healthcare facility

== See also ==
- Sembabule
- List of cities and towns in Uganda
