= Nyenga, Kenya =

Nyenga
- Location within Kenya
- Coordinates: 0.72°S 34.1°E
- Country: Kenya
- Province: Nyanza Province
- Time zone: UTC+3 (EAT)

Nyenga is a settlement in Kenya's Nyanza Province.

== Location ==
The settlement lies in extreme southwestern Kenya, close to the eastern shores of Lake Victoria. This location lies approximately 124 kilometres (77 mi), by road, southwest of Kisumu, the location of the provincial headquarters.
