= International Specialized Hospital of Uganda =

Hospital in Uganda

- Uganda Ministry of Health & Finasi-ISHU Construction SPV SMC Limited

Geography
- Location: Lubowa, Wakiso District, Central Region, Uganda
- Coordinates: 00°14′45″N 32°33′40″E

Organisation
- Care system: Public
- Type: Referral, Research and Teaching

Services
- Beds: 264

History
- Founded: 2025 (Expected)

Links
- Other links: List of hospitals in Uganda

The International Specialized Hospital of Uganda (ISHU) is a public-private, specialized, referral tertiary care medical facility under construction in Uganda. The hospital was expected to take two years to construct. The private developers who are constructing the hospital will operate it for ten years, then turn it over to the government of Uganda, in a public-private partnership arrangement.

== Location ==
The facility is located off of the Kampala–Entebbe Road, in Lubowa, Wakiso District, in the Central Region, of Uganda, approximately 13 kilometres (8 mi), by road, south of Mulago National Referral Hospital, in Kampala, the largest city and capital of Uganda. The hospital would sit on approximately 30 acres (12 ha), of land, formerly occupied by a coffee plantation.

== Overview ==
The ISHU is a specialized referral, tertiary treatment, research, and teaching hospital, which is intended to treat patients travelling out of the country to seek specialized medical care. In 2017, it was estimated that Ugandan patients spent approximately US$186 million on medical treatment abroad.

On 1 June 2017, the president of Uganda, Yoweri Museveni, performed the groundbreaking ceremony for the hospital. The development, designed by the architectural firm of Progetto CMR, of Milan, Italy, consists of nine buildings. These include the 260+ bed hospital, an outpatient department to handle 100 outpatients daily, housing for doctors, nurses and support staff, conference facilities, at least one hotel and a shopping centre.

The hospital is expected to cover a wide range of medical and surgical conditions, including organ transplants, neurosurgical operations, various cancers and orthopedic surgery and cardiac operations and treatments. The hospital design involves the installation of solar panels on the roofs of the buildings, to generate electricity and reduce the power purchased from the national grid. The design also involves the installation of rain-water harvesting systems, to reduce the amount of water purchased from the National Water and Sewerage Corporation.

== International collaboration ==
Following completion of construction, an 8-year operation period has been accorded to the developer. Following that, the ownership of the institution will revert to the Ugandan government. The facility is expected to attract referrals from the countries of the African Great Lakes region.

In September 2018, the Daily Monitor reported that the Ugandan Cabinet had resolved to ban the use of public funds to treat government officials and politicians at foreign medical facilities, once this hospital is completed. This will save government an estimated US$7–10 million every year.

== Parliamentary approval ==
In March 2019, the Parliament of Uganda approved a government guarantee of US$379.7 million (USh1.3 trillion) to construct this hospital. A consortium comprising Finasi of Italy and ROKO Construction Limited of Uganda, was selected to construct the hospital. The facility will include an 80-bed cancer centre. As of October 2024, construction was ongoing with partial opening to patients anticipated in calendar year 2025.

It is expected that when completed, the facility will employ 1,100 Ugandans and 30-40 medical expatriates. New construction includes a 264-bed hospital, an 82–room budget hotel, a 500-seater conference hall, a health training school and staff housing. The total built-up area is approximately 85,000 square metres (910,000 ft^{2}).

== See also ==
- Hospitals in Uganda
