= Mbuya Military Hospital =

Ugandan military hospital

- Uganda Ministry of Defence and Uganda People's Defence Force
- Map of Kampala showing the location of Mbuya.

Geography
- Location: Mbuya, Kampala, Central Region, Uganda
- Coordinates: 00°19′35″N 32°37′18″E

Organisation
- Care system: Military
- Type: Referral
- Affiliated university: UPDF

Services
- Emergency department: IV
- Beds: 275

History
- Founded: 30 April 2025

Links
- Other links: Hospitals in Uganda

Mbuya Military Hospital, also Mbuya Military Referral Hospital, is a military hospital in Uganda. The hospital is intended to serve as the referral hospital for members of Uganda's Armed Forces.

== Location ==
The hospital is located at Mbuya, Nakawa Division, in Uganda's capital city of Kampala, approximately 6.5 kilometres (4 mi), by road, east of the central business district. The coordinates of the hospital are 0°19'35.0"N, 32°37'18.0"E (Latitude:0.326389; Longitude:32.621667).

== Overview ==
The hospital is expected to cost US$35 million, funded by the Uganda People's Defence Force (UPDF). The hospital will serve as a referral hospital within the UPDF's health system. Both civilian and military personnel would be attended to.

== Construction ==
Construction of the main hospital block started in February 2018, by China National Aero-technology International Engineering Corporation (CATIC), and is expected to last three years, at a cost of USh105 billion (approx. US$30 million). The equipment to furnish this hospital is budgeted at USh30 billion (approx. US$8.5 million). The outpatient department and the dental unit has been under construction since February 2017, by the UPDF Engineering Brigade.

The outpatient department, constructed by the UPDF Engineering Brigade was completed in February 2020 and serves as the UPDF Officers Diagnostic Centre, until the completion of the main hospital. On completion, the hospital will also treat UPDF personnel injured in Somalia, as part of the AMISOM mission. Currently, those troops are treated at the Aga Khan University Hospital, Nairobi.

As of July 2020, the construction of the referral hospital was estimated at 56 percent complete, with total completion anticipated in 2021. With 93 percent of the construction completed, as of 6 March 2025, the 275-bed facility is expected to be commissioned on 30 April 2025.

== See also ==
- List of hospitals in Uganda
- Bombo Military Hospital
