= CURE Children's Hospital of Uganda =

- CURE International
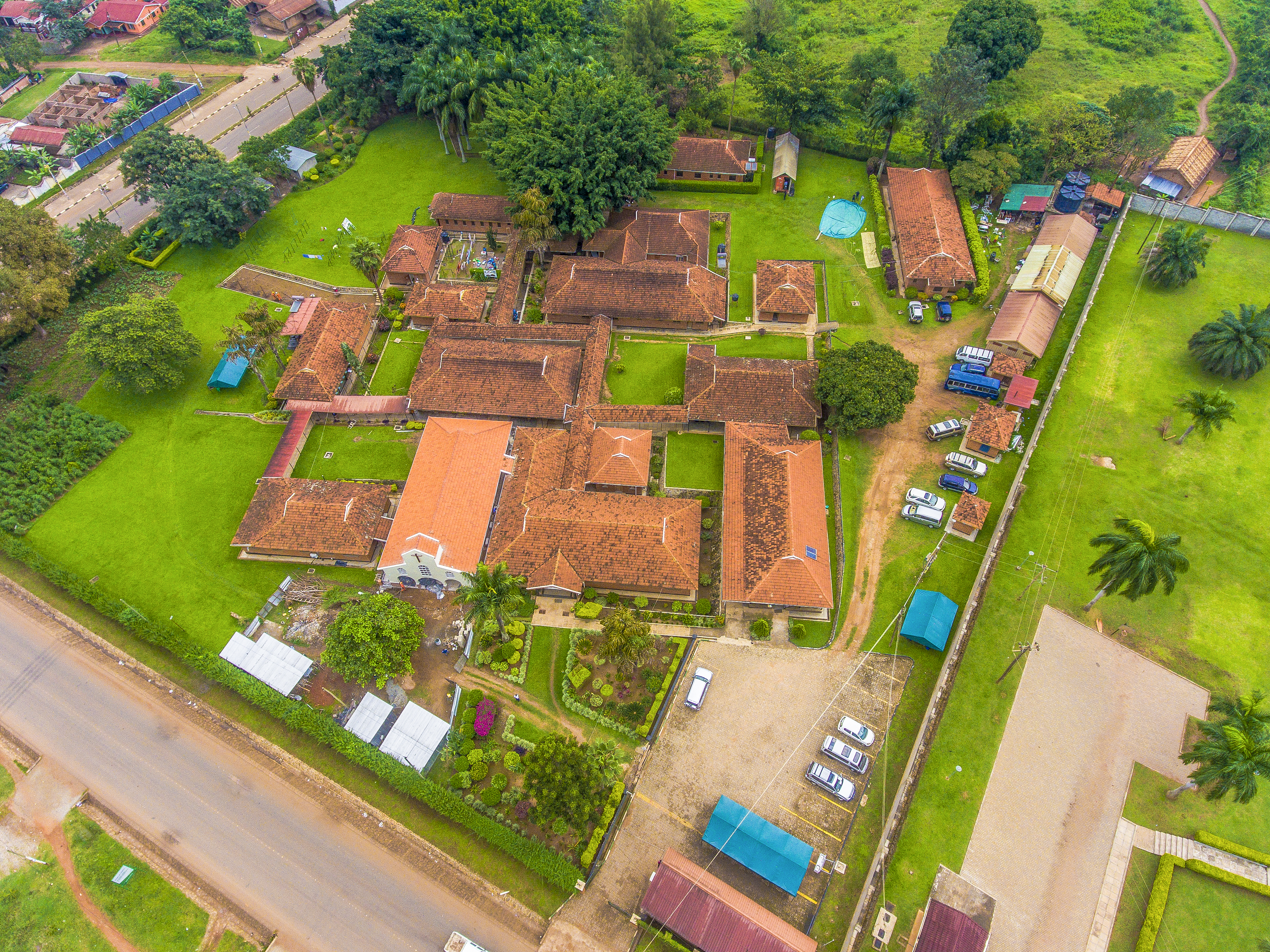

- Location within Uganda

Geography
- Location: 97 Bugwere Road, Mbale, Mbale District, Uganda
- Coordinates: 01°04′27″N 34°10′18″E

Organisation
- Care system: Private
- Type: Neurosurgery
- Affiliated university: West Virginia University School of Medicine

Services
- Emergency department: I
- Beds: 42

History
- Founded: 2000

Links
- Other links: Hospitals in Uganda

CURE Children's Hospital of Uganda (CCHU) is a specialized children's neurosurgery hospital in Uganda. It is a private hospital, owned and operated by CURE International. The hospital is also a teaching center in pediatric neurosurgery for Sub-Saharan Africa.

== Location ==
The hospital is located in the city of Mbale, in Mbale District, in Uganda's Eastern Region. This location is approximately 225 kilometres (140 mi), by road, northeast of Kampala, Uganda's capital and largest city. The coordinates of the hospital are 1°04'27.0"N, 34°10'18.0"E (Latitude:1.074167; Longitude:34.171667).

== Overview ==
CURE Children's Hospital of Uganda (CURE Uganda) is a private-not-for-profit (PNFP) Christian hospital specializing in pediatric neurosurgery and integrated spiritual ministry. The hospital was officially opened by H.E. Yoweri Kaguta Museveni, on January 19, 2001.

CURE Uganda plays a unique role as the first hospital in Sub-Saharan Africa to specialize in treating the neurological needs of children. It is a 77-bed specialty teaching hospital.In addition to providing charitable treatment for children, CURE Uganda ultimately endeavors to make advanced neurosurgical care available around the globe by training other neurosurgeons from Africa and other regions of the world.

Each year, CURE Uganda provides life-saving brain surgery for over 2,200+ patients and treats more than 10,000+ outpatients with neurological conditions.

The hospital is recognized as a center of excellence for pediatric neurosurgery. Neurosurgical diseases treated here include hydrocephalus, neural tube defects, spina bifida, epilepsy, and brain tumors. Infant hydrocephalus is one of the most common congenital abnormalities affecting the nervous system of children around the world. Since its inception, CURE Uganda has performed more life-saving surgeries for children with hydrocephalus ("accumulation of water on the brain") and spina bifida than any other hospital in the world.

== Training programs ==
CURE Neuro is a specialized program operating out of CURE Children's Hospital of Uganda (Mbale), focused on helping children with hydrocephalus and spina bifida survive and thrive. It operates across three core pillars: Treatment The program follows a comprehensive, research-informed strategy built on early detection, timely intervention, focused follow-up, and compassionate care. All treatment is provided free of charge to patients and families.

CURE Neuro has over 15 years of experience in the endoscopic treatment of hydrocephalus, performing more than 1,000 surgeries annually. The program trains neurosurgeons on-site through its fellowship, drawing on expert surgical and clinical faculty to build regional capacity across Africa.

With 25+ publications in leading journals including the New England Journal of Medicine, The Lancet, and the Journal of Neurosurgery, CURE Neuro actively informs global practice in the treatment of hydrocephalus and spina bifida. It maintains a network of fellows and research partners worldwide.

Neurosurgeons and medical institutions can engage with CURE Neuro through its fellowship program, partnership treatment locations, or research collaborations.

=== Program for advanced training in hydrocephalus ===
CCHU trains resident doctors in endoscopic third ventriculostomy (ETV), a procedure for the treatment of hydrocephalus, a condition characterized by the accumulation of fluid around the brain. CCHU offers a program to provide training and equipment to establish three new ETV Centers each year. iPATH Fellows train at CCHU for three months and, upon completion of their training, establish a center for the surgical treatment of hydrocephalus in their own country. CCHU provides approximately US$30,000 worth of equipment for each new center. CCHU has had iPATH applicants from Ghana, Zambia, Afghanistan, Rwanda, Nepal, Senegal, Honduras, and Madagascar. The first iPATH Fellow to graduate from the program practices in western Tanzania, in a CCHU-aided pediatric neurosurgery center.

=== Comprehensive epilepsy program of Uganda and East Africa ===
In collaboration with the West Virginia University School of Medicine, CCHU established in 2005 a comprehensive epilepsy program for Uganda and Eastern Africa. The program aims to identify, evaluate and treat Ugandans with epilepsy. It also trains African physicians in the evaluation and treatment of epilepsy, and conducts research on the causes of epilepsy in Africa and best practices for treatment.

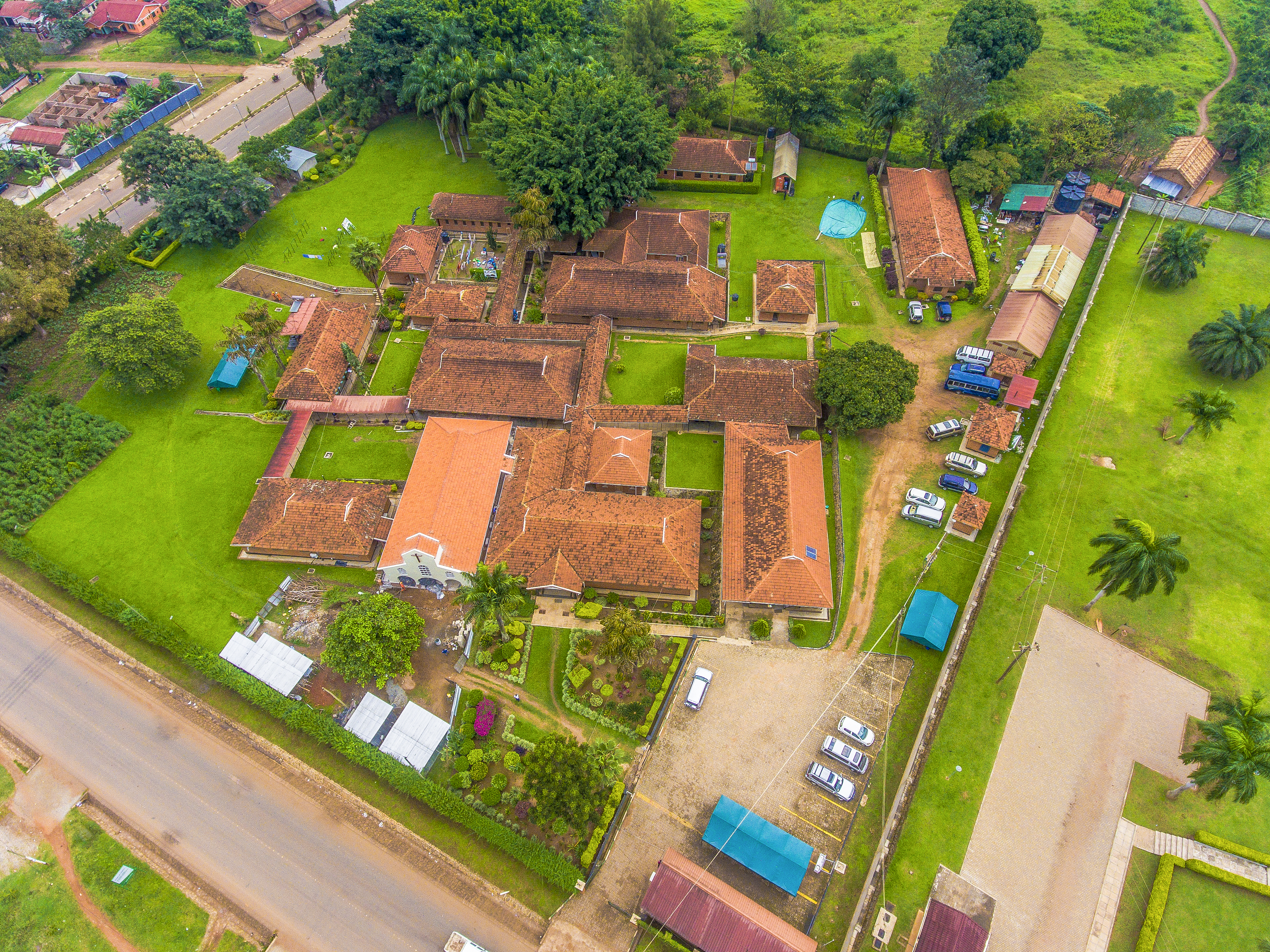
Aerial view of Cure Children's Hospital

Neurosurgeons Benjamin Warf and Warren Boling of West Virginia University performed the first three epilepsy surgeries ever done in the region. The program is ongoing and is being evaluated for further expansion.

=== Pediatric neurosurgical fellowship ===
With the encouragement and support of international neurosurgical societies, CCHU has established a fellowship program for pediatric neurosurgeons. It is the only such program in Sub-Saharan Africa. Two neurosurgeons per year will study and work at CCHU, to focus their skills on children and to concentrate on a range of afflictions of the brain and central nervous system.

== See also ==
- Hospitals in Uganda
- Entebbe Children's Surgical Hospital
