= Kiryandongo =

Kiryandongo Bweyale Kiryandongo Municipality
- Location in Uganda
- Coordinates: 01°57′09″N 32°08′20″E
- Country: Uganda
- Region: Western Region of Uganda
- Sub-region: Bunyoro sub-region
- District: Kiryandongo District
- Elevation: 3,600 ft (1,100 m)

Population (2024 Census)
  - Total: 58,489

Kiryandongo is a town in the Western Region of Uganda. It is the main municipal, administrative, and commercial center of Kiryandongo District.

== Location ==
Kiryandongo is on the main Gulu-Masindi highway, approximately 50 kilometres (31 mi), by road, north-east of Masindi, the largest town in the Bunyoro sub-region. This is approximately 225 kilometres (140 mi), by road, north-west of Kampala, Uganda's capital and largest city. The coordinates of the town are 1°57'09.0"N, 32°08'20.0"E (Latitude:1.9525; Longitude:32.1389).

== Population ==
In 2014, the national population census put the population of Kiryandongo at 31,610.

== Points of interest ==
The following points of interest lie within the town or close to its borders:

- headquarters of Kiryandongo District administration
- offices of Kiryandongo Town Council
- Kiryandongo central market
- Kiryandongo General Hospital, a 109-bed public hospital administered by the Uganda Ministry of Health

== See also ==
- Karuma Power Station
- List of cities and towns in Uganda
