= Bombo Military Hospital =

Hospital in Uganda

- Uganda Ministry of Defence and Uganda People's Defence Force

Geography
- Location: Bombo, Luweero District, Central Region, Uganda
- Coordinates: 00°35′11″N 32°32′10″E

Organisation
- Care system: Public
- Type: General & Referral
- Affiliated university: UPDF, Makerere University Walter Reed Project

Services
- Emergency department: III
- Beds: 250

History
- Founded: 1986; 40 years ago

Links
- Other links: Hospitals in Uganda

Bombo Military Hospital is the largest military hospital in Uganda.The hospital is known for its specialized doctors and equipment. It also serves civilians from the districts of Luweero, Wakiso, Kampala, and Mukono.

== Location ==
The hospital is located on the premises of Bombo Military Barracks, which is the headquarters of the Land Forces of the Uganda People's Defence Force (UPDF), approximately 32 kilometres (20 mi) by road, north of Mulago National Referral Hospital, in Kampala, Uganda's capital city.

This is approximately 41 kilometres (25 mi), by road, northwest of Mbuya Military Hospital, in Mbuya, Nakawa Division, in southeastern Kampala. The geographical coordinates of Bombo Military Hospital are 0°35'11.0"N, 32°32'10.0"E (Latitude:0.586389; Longitude:32.536111).

== Overview ==
The hospital is a military hospital that serves as a referral center for the various health units within the UPDF. However, because of the severe need from the surrounding community, the hospital attends to civilians from the surrounding communities. Beginning in September 2012, the hospital has been collaborating with Makerere University Walter Reed Project to improve laboratory services at the hospital.

== Target population ==
The hospital serves the population of Bombo Military Barracks. It also handles patient referrals from other UPDF health units in the country. Because of severe need within the community, exacerbated by the ongoing repairs to Mulago National Referral Hospital, Bombo Military Hospital attends to civilian patients from the surrounding community. In 2014, the hospital attended to 2,145 baby deliveries, averaging nearly 6 new babies daily, with the case load expected to increase in 2015.

== See also ==
- List of hospitals in Uganda
