= Fort Portal Hospital =

Fort Portal Regional Referral Hospital
- Uganda Ministry of Health
- Location within Uganda

Geography
- Location: Fort Portal, Kabarole District, Western Region, Uganda
- Coordinates: 00°39′19″N 30°16′53″E

Organisation
- Care system: Public
- Type: General & Teaching

Services
- Emergency department: I
- Beds: 333

Links
- Other links: Hospitals in Uganda; Medical education in Uganda

Fort Portal Regional Referral Hospital, commonly known as Fort Portal Hospital, sometimes referred to as Buhinga Hospital, is a hospital in the town of Fort Portal, in Fort Portal District, Western Uganda. It is the referral hospital for the districts of Bundibugyo, Kabarole, Kamwenge, Kasese, Ntoroko and Kyenjojo.

== Location ==
Fort Portal Hospital lies within the city of Fort Portal, approximately 148 kilometres (92 mi), by road, west of Mubende Regional Referral Hospital. This location is approximately 294 kilometres (183 mi), west of Mulago National Referral Hospital, in Kampala, Uganda's capital and largest city. The coordinates of the hospital are:0°39'19.0"N, 30°16'53.0"E (Latitude:0.655278; Longitude:30.281389).

== Overview ==
Fort Portal Hospital is a public hospital, funded by the Uganda Ministry of Health and general care in the hospital is free. It is one of the 13 "Regional Referral Hospitals" in Uganda. The hospital is designated as one of the 15 "Internship Hospitals" where graduates of Ugandan medical schools can serve one year of internship under the supervision of qualified specialists and consultants. The bed capacity of Fort Portal Hospital is quoted as 333.

The Olympic rower and medical missionary, Charles Sergel, worked at Fort Portal Hospital between 1938 and 1939.

== See also ==
- Hospitals in Uganda
