= Mbarara Hospital =

Mbarara Regional Referral Hospital
- Uganda Ministry of Health
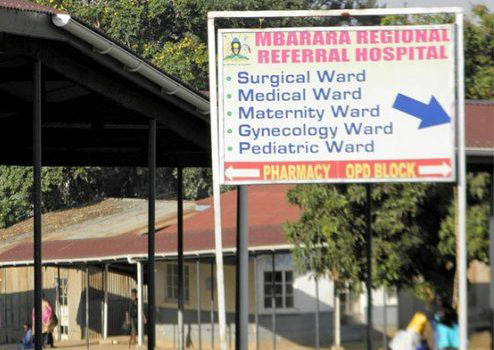

- Location within Uganda

Geography
- Location: Mbarara, Ankole sub-region Western Region, Uganda
- Coordinates: 00°36′59″S 30°39′32″E

Organisation
- Care system: Public
- Type: General and Teaching
- Affiliated university: Mbarara University

Services
- Emergency department: I
- Beds: 600+

History
- Founded: 1940

Links
- Website: mbararahospital.go.ug
- Lists: Hospitals in Uganda
- Other links: Hospitals in Uganda; Medical education in Uganda

Mbarara Regional Referral Hospital (MRRH), also known as Mbarara Hospital or Mbarara University Teaching Hospital, is a government-owned healthcare facility located in Mbarara City, in the Western Region of Uganda. It serves as a referral center for the Ankole sub-region, neighboring districts and surrounding countries, including the Democratic Republic of Congo, Rwanda, Tanzania, and Burundi. The hospital provides specialized and super-specialized services to a catchment area of twelve districts, including the City of Mbarara.

== Location ==
The hospital is in Mbarara City, Ankole sub-region and is located within the central business district of the city. This location is approximately 139 kilometres (86 mi), by road, west of Masaka Regional Referral Hospital, in the city of Masaka. This is approximately 268 kilometres (167 mi), by road, southwest of Mulago National Referral Hospital, in Kampala, the capital city of Uganda. The geographical coordinates of Mbarara Hospital are0°36'59.0"S, 30°39'32.0"E (Latitude:-0.616389; Longitude:30.658889).

== Overview ==
Mbarara Hospital is a public hospital, founded by the Uganda Ministry of Health, and general care in the hospital is free. It is affiliated with the Mbarara University School of Medicine, the medical school of Mbarara University of Science and Technology, and serves as the teaching hospital of that university. The hospital is staffed by medical students and residents. The hospital also acts as a teaching hospital for Nursing students from Bishop Stuart University.

Mbarara Hospital is one of the 15 internship Hospitals in Uganda where graduates of Ugandan medical schools can serve one year of internship under the supervision of qualified specialists and consultants.

Its bed capacity is 600, although, as is the case with many Ugandan public hospitals, many more patients are admitted, with the excess sleeping on the floors. There is an acute shortage of functioning equipment for provision of tertiary healthcare services.

== Renovations ==
In January 2011, President Yoweri Museveni laid the foundation stone at the hospital to mark the renovation, rehabilitation, and expansion of the hospital and transform it into a National Referral Hospital. The physical works were undertaken by the Excel Construction Company, a subsidiary of the Madhvani Group. The work, expected to take approximately 18 months, was anticipated to be complete by the end of 2011. The hospital's bed capacity was increased from 300 to 608.

In June 2024, construction began on a new 100-bed, stand-alone, four story, neonatal intensive care unit at a cost of US$1.9 million, donated by the World Bank.

== See also ==
- Hospitals in Uganda
- Mulago Hospital
