= Lira Hospital =

Ugandan public hospital

Lira Regional Referral Hospital
- Uganda Ministry of Health
- Location within Uganda

Geography
- Location: Lira, Lira District, Lango sub-region, Uganda
- Coordinates: 02°15′06″N 32°54′05″E

Organisation
- Care system: Public
- Type: General and teaching

Services
- Emergency department: I
- Beds: 254

History
- Founded: 1920

Links
- Lists: Hospitals in Uganda
- Other links: Hospitals in Uganda; Medical education in Uganda

Lira Regional Referral Hospital, commonly known as Lira Hospital, is a hospital in Lira in the Northern Region of Uganda. It is the referral hospital for the districts of Amolatar, Apac, Dokolo, Lira, Kole, and Oyam.

== Location ==
Lira Hospital is located along Police Road, in the central business district of the city of Lira, approximately 101 kilometres (63 mi), southeast of Gulu Regional Referral Hospital, in Gulu City. This is approximately 124 kilometres (77 mi) by road, northwest of Soroti Regional Referral Hospital, in the city of Soroti.

Lira Regional Referral Hospital is located approximately 339 kilometres (211 mi), by road, north of Mulago National Referral Hospital, in the city of Kampala, Uganda's capital. The coordinates of Lira Hospital are: 02°15'06.0"N, 32°54'07.0"E (Latitude:2.251667; Longitude:32.901944)

== Overview ==
Lira Hospital is a public hospital, funded by the Uganda Ministry of Health, and general care in the hospital is free. It is one of the regional referral hospitals in Uganda. The hospital is designated as one of the internship hospitals in Uganda, where graduates of Ugandan medical schools can serve one year of internship under the supervision of qualified specialists and consultants. The bed capacity of the hospital in 2012 was 254. Staff shortage is a concern. In 2012, of the 39 required doctors, the hospital had only 9 doctors.

In September 2017, the hospital commissioned an 8-apartment building to house some of the critically essential staff, so that they can quickly respond to emergencies. Prior to then, all staff lived off-campus, away from the hospital. Construction of the three-story building started in January 2015 and lasted 2 years and eight months, at a cost of USh1.5 billion (approx. US$430,000), fully funded by the Government of Uganda.

== See also ==
- Hospitals in Uganda
- List of universities in Uganda
- Juliet Sekabunga Nalwanga
