= Mubende Hospital =

Public hospital in Uganda

Mubende Regional Referral Hospital
- Uganda Ministry of Health

Geography
- Location: Mubende, Mubende District, Central Region, Uganda
- Coordinates: 00°34′03″N 31°23′35″E

Organisation
- Care system: Public
- Type: General, Teaching

Services
- Emergency department: I
- Beds: 175

Links
- Other links: Hospitals in Uganda; Medical education in Uganda

Mubende Regional Referral Hospital, commonly known as Mubende Hospital is a hospital in the town of Mubende, in the Central Region of Uganda. It is the referral hospital for the districts of Mubende, Mityana, Kiboga, and Kyankwanzi.

== Location ==
Mubende Regional Referral Hospital is located on Old Kampala Road, in the central business district of the municipal of Mubende, about 150 kilometres (93 mi) west of Mulago National Referral Hospital. This is approximately 148 kilometres (92 mi) east of Fort Portal Regional Referral Hospital. The coordinates of Mubende Hospital are 0°34'03.0"N, 31°23'35.0"E (Latitude:0.567496; Longitude:31.393041).

== Overview ==
Mubende Hospital is a public hospital, funded by the Uganda Ministry of Health and general care in the hospital is free. It is one of the thirteen Regional Referral Hospitals in Uganda. The hospital is designated as one of the fifteen Internship Hospitals in Uganda where graduates of Ugandan medical schools can serve one year of internship under the supervision of qualified specialists and consultants.

The hospital serves a catchment population estimated at about 610,600 people, as of July 2020. The hospital collaborates with Mildmay Uganda, in the implementation of the Accelerating Epidemic Control Project against HIV/AIDS, that covers the districts of Kiboga, Kyankwanzi, Mubende, Mityana, Luweero, Kassanda, Nakasongola and Nakaseke. The project is funded by the United States' Centers for Disease Control and by the President's Emergency Plan for AIDS Relief (PEPFAR). In July 2020, the project was in its third consecutive year of implementation.

== See also ==
- List of hospitals in Uganda
- 2022 Ebola outbreak, the hospital treated some cases of the Sudan Ebola strain
