= Hoima Hospital =

Public hospital in Uganda

Hoima Regional Referral Hospital
- Uganda Ministry of Health

Geography
- Location: Hoima, Hoima District, Western Region, Uganda
- Coordinates: 01°25′40″N 31°21′16″E

Organisation
- Care system: Public
- Type: General and teaching

Services
- Emergency department: I
- Beds: 317 (2020)

History
- Founded: 1935

Links
- Other links: Hospitals in Uganda; Medical education in Uganda

Hoima Regional Referral Hospital, commonly known as Hoima Hospital, is a hospital in the city of Hoima in Hoima District in the Western Region of Uganda. It is the referral hospital for the districts of Bulisa, Hoima, Kibaale, Kiryandongo, Kagadi, Kakumiro, Kikuube, and Masindi.

== Location ==
The hospital is approximately 110 kilometres (68 mi), by road, north-west of Mubende Regional Referral Hospital. This is approximately 198 kilometres (123 mi), by road, north-west of Mulago National Referral Hospital, in Kampala, Uganda's capital city. The coordinates of Hoima Regional Referral Hospital are 01°25'41.0"N, 31°21'16.0"E (Latitude:1.428051; Longitude:31.354451).

== Overview ==
Hoima Hospital is a public hospital, funded by the Uganda Ministry of Health, and general care in the hospital is free. It is one of the thirteen Regional Referral Hospitals in Uganda. The hospital is one of the fifteen internship hospitals in Uganda where graduates of Ugandan medical schools can serve one year of internship under the supervision of qualified specialists and consultants. The bed capacity of Hoima Hospital was reported to be 280 in 2013. Of the 337 gazetted staff positions, only 251 were filled as of March 2011, leaving 85 vacant positions.

Established in 1935, the facility initially functioned as a district hospital. In 1994, it was upgraded to Regional Referral status for the Bunyoro sub-region. It also serves patients from nearby Eastern Democratic Republic of the Congo. In 2019, the Ugandan Ministry of Health estimated the hospital's catchment population to number approximately 3 million people.

== See also ==
- List of hospitals in Uganda
