= Bryan Wooleston Langlands =

British geographer & academic (1928–1989)

- Born: 1928; Eastbourne, Sussex
- Died: 8 January 1989 (aged 60–61)
- Education: London School of Economics
- Occupations: geographer and professor
- Years active: 1950-1989
- Employer(s): Makerere University, The Uganda Society, Ulster University
- Title: Professor, President of The Uganda Society
- Term: 1970 - 1971
- Predecessor: Pio Zirimu
- Successor: Dr. F. Sempala-Ntege

Bryan Wooleston Langlands (14 October 1928 – 1989) was a British geographer and Professor of African historical geography.

He also served as the 37th president of The Uganda Society between 1970 and 1971

== Early life and education ==
Langlands was born in Eastbourne, Sussex on 14 October 1928. He graduated with honours in 1952 from the London School Economics and he pursued his academic qualifications in geography. He spend most of his time in Uganda where he made contributions in both the academic and administration arenas in colonial and post-colonial Uganda.

== Career ==
In 1953 Langlands was appointed as an Assistant Lecturer of Geography in Makerere University in Kampala where he after became the Professor and Head of the Department of Geography. In 1970-1971, Langlands was the president for The Uganda Society replacing Pio Zirimu and was replaced by Dr. Sempala Ntege. After being ordered to leave Uganda in 1976 by the Ugandan President, Idi Amin, in 1977, Bryan Langlands became Director of Studies and Head of the Department with the title of Professor in the newly established School of Environmental Sciences at Ulster Polytechnic.

== Contributions and research ==
Langlands' research was characterized by its depth and breadth. He accumulated a substantial library, exploring various aspects of African historical geography. His studies delved into topics such as migration patterns, cultural landscapes, and the impact of colonialism on African societies. Much of his work was published in the Makerere Department of Geography Series of Occasional Papers and in The Uganda Journal.

== Death ==
In January 1989, tragedy struck when Professor Bryan Wooleston Langlands died in the British Airways crash of BD092 at Kegworth, Leicestershire. His death was a impactful to the academic community, as Langlands had been a key individual in the field of geography.

== Legacy ==
In 1978, he was awarded an Order of the British Empire (OBE) for his services to Higher Education Overseas.
