= James Harvey Chaplin =

British meteorologist and anthropologist (1924–1967)

- Born: 16 September 1924; England
- Died: 31 March 1967 (aged 42); Kampala, Uganda
- Education: University of London (PgD), University of East Africa (MA)
- Occupations: archaeologist and anthropologist
- Years active: c. 1943 – 1967
- Parents: Harvey Hopper Chaplin; Evelyn Bessie Chaplin
- Honours: Fellow of the Royal Meteorological Society and the Royal Geographical Society

James "Jim" Harvey Chaplin (16 September 1924 – 31 March 1967) was a British meteorologist, archaeologist, and anthropologist who primarily studied weather, culture, and rock art in East and Central Africa.

== Career ==
Chaplin's major scientific contributions include:

- performing ethnographic research on iron and copper smelting that was useful in describing metalworking traditions from the Iron Age
- rapidly organizing an excavation to collect evidence of 15th-century trading relations involving Monomatapa, the Zambian plateau, and the coast
- undertaking foundational work on rock art in Zambia and East Africa
- serving as "the first executive officer of the Monuments Commission" in Uganda
- making "significant contributions to the study of Zambia's past"

=== Job positions ===
- [c. 1942 – 1945]: served as a seaman and meteorologist in the Royal Navy in the latter part of World War II, during which he visited Cape Town and Durban
- 1952 – c. 1957: member of the Meteorological Department of the Northern Rhodesian Government
- 1957–1962: Inspector of Monuments on the Commission for the Preservation of Natural and Historical Monuments and Relics, in close association with the Rhodes-Livingstone Museum
- c. 1964: Director of Antiquities in Uganda
- 1965–1967: Inspector of Monuments at the Department of Antiquities; Director of Ancient Monuments of the Uganda Ministry of Culture; Curator of Monuments for Uganda

=== Activities and affiliations ===
- "had been a keen Boy Scout"
- 1949–1951: participated in the Falkland Islands Dependencies Survey (FIDS), at Admiralty Bay, South Shetlands (Base G; 63° S, 58° W), where he observed snow crystals between 1949 February 6 and November 30, and Port Lockroy, Graham Land (Base A; 65° S, 63° W), 1950 February 3 – 1951 January 25 (present 1950 January 24 – 1951 February 10; serving as a meteorologist and the leader of the station), in Antarctica
- 1950 May 17: elected as a Fellow of the Royal Meteorological Society
- 1951 December 17: elected for Fellowship with the Royal Geographical Society
- 1957 December: became a member of the South African Archaeological Society
- 1957 December – 1958 January: accompanied an International Geophysical Year expedition to climb Mount Kenya with 13 other people to survey its glaciers, serving as one of two meteorologists
- c. 1960: became an Associate of Current Anthropology
- c. 1963: received a minor grant for research on East Africa from the Emslie Horniman Anthropological Scholarship Fund
- 1964: joined two research expeditions with Merrick Posnansky to Lolui Island, finding rock gongs and rock art
- c. 1965: became a Life Fellow of the Royal Anthropological Institute of Great Britain and Ireland
- c. 1966 – 1967: assisted in the editing of the Uganda Society's the Uganda Journal

=== Education ===
- c. 1947–1948: University College London
- "did not have a university education" and progressed his career through work experience instead
- 1962 – 1964 June: Post-graduate Diploma in Prehistoric Archaeology from the University of London's Institute of Archaeology
- c. 1964 – 1966: M.A. from the African Studies Program at the Makerere University College of the University of East Africa, studying the symbolism of Central African rock art, supervised by Professor Merrick Posnansky

=== Publications ===
Chaplin's publications include academic articles and letters, poetry, and more:

- Chaplin, J. H. (13 August 1950). "Rime and the reason" (Photograph). Royal Meteorological Society. Published in: "Weather Photographic Competition Results". Weather. 8 (1): 27, plate 3. January 1953. Bibcode:1953Wthr....8...27.. doi:10.1002/j.1477-8696.1953.tb02582.x. ISSN 0043-1656. (Note: The actual photograph is included in 10.1002/j.1477-8696.1953.tb02580.x.)
- Chaplin, J.H. (February 1951). "The gravestones of Deception Island, South Shetlands, Antarctica" [Copy of inscriptions on gravestones] (5 leaves, typescript (carbon)). Cambridge, England: Scott Polar Research Institute. MS 135; Archives (*726.1) : 93.
- Chaplin, J. H. (June 1952). "Leonardo the Florentine". Weather. 7 (6): 170–171. Bibcode:1952Wthr....7..170C. doi:10.1002/j.1477-8696.1952.tb01481.x. ISSN 0043-1656.
- Chaplin, J. H. (1954). "On some aspects of rainfall in Northern Rhodesia : Part I ; Part II". The Northern Rhodesia Journal. 2 (IV; VI): 32–38; 16–23, table I. Google Books 7B8OAQAAMAAJ. NRZam V2N4, V2N6.
  - Part I corrected in: Chaplin, James H. (1954). "Corrigenda: Rainfall in Northern Rhodesia". Correspondence. The Northern Rhodesia Journal. II (5): 88–89. NRZam V2N5.
- Chaplin, J. H. (September 1954). "On the Wet Season in Northern Rhodesia". Weather. 9 (9): 272–275. Bibcode:1954Wthr....9..272C. doi:10.1002/j.1477-8696.1954.tb01818.x. ISSN 0043-1656.
- Chaplin, J. H. (January–February 1955). "On the Reliability of Rainfall in Northern Rhodesia". Rhodesia Agricultural Journal. 52 (1): 33–34. Google Books WckmAQAAIAAJ.
- Chaplin, J. H. (November 1955). "A Dorset Cloudburst". Letters to the Editors. Weather. 10 (11): 395–396 (see p. 396). doi:10.1002/j.1477-8696.1955.tb00120.x. eISSN 1477-8696. ISSN 0043-1656.
- Chaplin, J. H. (October 1956) [MS. received 3 January 1954]. "A Note on Snow Crystal Types in the Falkland Islands Dependencies". Journal of Glaciology. 2 (20): 733–734. doi:10.3189/S0022143000024990. ISSN 0022-1430.
- Chaplin, J. H., ed. (1956). "The Cost of Exploring the Zambezi: 1859". The Northern Rhodesia Journal. 3 (2): 164–170. Google Books QCAOAQAAMAAJ. NRZam V3N2.
- Chaplin, J. H. (December 1956). "A Note on Mancala Games in Northern Rhodesia". Man. 56 193: 168–170. doi:10.2307/2793414. ISSN 0025-1496. JSTOR 2793414.
- Chaplin, James H. (December 1956). "African Weather-Lore". The South African Archaeological Bulletin. 11 (44): 111–112. doi:10.2307/3886589. ISSN 0038-1969. JSTOR 3886589.
- Chaplin, J. H. (1957). "A Note on the Brother-Sister Relationship in Northern Rhodesia". Ethnos. 22 (1–2): 15–19. doi:10.1080/00141844.1957.9980831. eISSN 1469-588X. ISSN 0014-1844. AfricaBib P00011550.
- Chaplin, J. H. (May–June 1957). "Sunshine in Northern Rhodesia". Rhodesia Agricultural Journal. 54 (3): 264–272. Google Books pK4mAQAAIAAJ.
- Chaplin, J. H. (October 1957). "On the Making of a Chitumwa: A Northern Rhodesian Protective Amulet". Man. 57 184: 148–150. doi:10.2307/2793847. ISSN 0025-1496. JSTOR 2793847.
- Chaplin, J. H. (June 1958). "A Note on Central African Dream Concepts". Man. 58 119: 90–92. doi:10.2307/2795427. ISSN 0025-1496. JSTOR 2795427.
- Chaplin, James H. (1950s) [c. 1957–1959]. Antarctic Songs. An International Publication. Cambridge: P. R. Macmillan.
- Chaplin, J. H. (March 1959). "The Munwa Stream Rock-Engravings". The South African Archaeological Bulletin. 14 (53): 28–34. doi:10.2307/3886743. ISSN 0038-1969. JSTOR 3886743.
- Chaplin, J. H. (1959). "A preliminary note on the rainbow in Africa South of the Sahara". Ethnos. 24 (3–4): 151–171. doi:10.1080/00141844.1959.9980870. ISSN 0014-1844.
- Chaplin, J. H. (October 1959). "A Note on Some Central African Forenames". Africa: Journal of the International African Institute. 29 (4): 384–390. doi:10.2307/1157927. ISSN 0001-9720. JSTOR 1157927.
- Chaplin, J. H. (May 18–22, 1960). Boughey, A. S. (ed.). A preliminary account of Iron Age burials with gold in the Gwembe Valley, Northern Rhodesia. First Federal Science Congress. Salisbury (published 1962). pp. 397–406. Google Books m66BbQIXgncC. Google Scholar 16805270365908513201.
  - Reproduced in "Notes and correspondence RE: analysis of cotton fabrics found at Ingombe Illede, Gurembe Valley, N. Rhodesia", AR3/1/2, FM:137453, at the Museum of Archaeology and Anthropology.
- Chaplin, J. H. (June 1960). "Some Unpublished Rock-Paintings of Northern Rhodesia". The South African Archaeological Bulletin. 15 (58): 45–49. doi:10.2307/3886721. ISSN 0038-1969. JSTOR 3886721.
  - Corrections in: "Corrigenda". The South African Archaeological Bulletin. 15 (59): 124. September 1960. doi:10.2307/3886572. ISSN 0038-1969. JSTOR 3886572.
- Chaplin, J. H. (June 1961). "Notes on Traditional Smelting in Northern Rhodesia". The South African Archaeological Bulletin. 16 (62): 53–60, plates I–II. doi:10.2307/3886869. ISSN 0038-1969. JSTOR 3886869.
- Roux, Edward; Rijswijck, O. van; Cole-Beuchat, P-D.; Sansom, Basil L.; Birkinshaw, P. C.; Rita-Ferreira, A.; Malan, B. D.; Chaplin, J. H. (1961). "Book reviews". African Studies. 20 (2): 133–144. doi:10.1080/00020186108707136. ISSN 0002-0184.
- Chaplin, J. H. (1961). "Suicide in Northern Rhodesia". African Studies. 20 (3): 145–174. doi:10.1080/00020186108707137. ISSN 0002-0184.
- Chaplin, J. H. (1961). "A Note on African Taxes and Tax Stamps". The Northern Rhodesia Journal. 4: 443–445. Google Books yCAOAQAAMAAJ. NRZam V4N5.
- Chaplin, J. H. (1961). "A Note on the Forts of the Eastern Province". The Northern Rhodesia Journal. 4: 462–468. Google Books yCAOAQAAMAAJ. NRZam V4N5.
- Chaplin, J. H. (December 1961). "Diffusion and Invention". Discussion and Criticism. Current Anthropology. 2 (5): 501. doi:10.1086/200231. ISSN 0011-3204. JSTOR 2739790.
- Chaplin, J. H. (December 1961). "A Note on Rock Grooves in Northern Rhodesia". The South African Archaeological Bulletin. 16 (64): 149, plate I. doi:10.2307/3887305. ISSN 0038-1969. JSTOR 3887305.
- Chaplin, J. H. (March 1962). "Further Unpublished Examples of Rock-Art from Northern Rhodesia". The South African Archaeological Bulletin. 17 (65): 5–13. doi:10.2307/3886929. ISSN 0038-1969. JSTOR 3886929.
- Chaplin, J. H. (April 1962). "Wiving and Thriving in Northern Rhodesia". Africa: Journal of the International African Institute. 32 (2): 111–122. doi:10.2307/1158179. ISSN 0001-9720. JSTOR 1158179.
  - Reproduced as: Chaplin, J. H. (1973). "Wiving and Thriving in Northern Rhodesia". In Turnbull, Colin M. (ed.). Africa and Change (First ed.). New York, NY: Alfred A. Knopf, Inc.; distributed by Random House. pp. 170–184 (see also metadata on pp. v, ix, and abstract/commentary on pp. 146–148). ISBN 978-0-394-31520-1. LCCN 70-39817. Internet Archive africachange0000turn.
- Chaplin, J. H. (1962). "Notes on Some Sites in Soli History". The Northern Rhodesia Journal. 5 (1): 50–55. Google Books MyEOAQAAMAAJ. NRZam V5N1.
- Chaplin, J. H. (December 1962). "[Review of] Rock Engravings from Driekops Eiland and Other Sites South-West of Johannesburg. Lina M. Slack. Centaur Press, London, 1962. £8 8s. (R16.80).". The South African Archaeological Bulletin. 17 (68): 243. doi:10.2307/3887439. ISSN 0038-1969. JSTOR 3887439.
- Chaplin, James H. (December 1962). "The problem raised in the December 1961 number of CA (2:406) as to whether you are publishing in English or American is a difficult one. [...]". Our Readers Write. Current Anthropology. 3 (5): 449–450 (see p. 449). doi:10.1086/200312. JSTOR 2739687.
- Chaplin, J. H. (April 1963). "I am firmly against editorial interference with comment, but [...]". Our Readers Write. Current Anthropology. 4 (2): 137, 154 (see p. 137). doi:10.1086/200353. ISSN 0011-3204. JSTOR 2739836.
- Chaplin, J. H. (May 1963). "Some Aspects of Folk Art in Northern Rhodesia". Man. 63 (4) 81: 69–72. doi:10.2307/2797966. ISSN 0025-1496. JSTOR 2797966.
- Chaplin, J. H. (June 1963). "In regard to a comment R. F. G. Adams makes on learning ability (CA 3:298) [...] Rudolph's letter (CA 3:1) is very important. [...]". Our Readers Write. Current Anthropology. 4 (3): 233–234, 328–329 (see p. 233). doi:10.1086/200372. ISSN 0011-3204. JSTOR 2739607.
- Chaplin, James H. (October 1963). "A Report on Sexual Behavior: Six Case Histories from Northern Rhodesia". Advances in Sex Research. 1 Chapter 2: 13–26. ISSN 1934-5984. JSTOR 3811190.
- Chaplin, J. H. (October 1963). "Moslem Prayer Places". Correspondence. Man. 63 (9) 198: 162. ISSN 0025-1496. JSTOR 2795707.
- Chaplin, J(ames) H. (December 1963). "I realize that CA February 1963 was the first of the Dutch printings [...] [and] May I again raise the question of a house rule for dates? [...]". Our Readers Write. Current Anthropology. 4 (5): 477–478, 531–532 (see p. 532). doi:10.1086/200418. JSTOR 2739649.
- Chaplin, J. H. (April 1964). "Rock-Engravings at Nyambwezu, Northern Rhodesia". The South African Archaeological Bulletin. 19 (73): 13–14. doi:10.2307/3888110. ISSN 0038-1969. JSTOR 3888110. Google Books NhrTAAAAMAAJ.
- Chaplin, Jim (1964). "Headline Epitaph: Nakulabye". Poetry. Transition. Vol. 4, no. 17. p. 40. JSTOR 2934144.
- Chaplin, J. H. (October 1964). ""Identifications Wanted": Could a brief note appear [...] David Brokensha's "A Study of Larteth, Ghana" (CA 4:533-4) was an admirable essay [...]". Our Readers Write. Current Anthropology. 5 (4): 281–282 (see p. 282). doi:10.1086/200500. ISSN 0011-3204. JSTOR 2740255.
- Chaplin, James H. (December 1964). "I do not really think that the "Research Grants" item [...]". Our Readers Write. Current Anthropology. 5 (5): 357–358, 454–457 (see p. 358). doi:10.1086/200524. JSTOR 2739986.
- Chaplin, J. H. (March 1965). "[Review of] The Rock Paintings of Tassili. Jean-Dominique Lajoux. Thames & Hudson, London 1963. £3.15s (204 pp. 164 plates, 23 in colour).". The South African Archaeological Bulletin. 20 (77): 37. doi:10.2307/3887902. ISSN 0038-1969. JSTOR 3887902.
- Chaplin, Jim (March 1965). "Poems from the South: [review of] SJAMBOK : AND OTHER POEMS FROM AFRICA Douglas Livingstone, Oxford University Press, London, 1964, pp 56 16/- U.K.". Transition. Vol. 5(i), no. 20. p. 53. doi:10.2307/2934394. JSTOR 2934394.
- Chaplin, Jim (March 1965). "The Assimilating Giraffe: [review of] WHEN WE BECOME MEN Naomi Mitchison Collins pp. 255. 1965 18s.". Transition. Vol. 5(i), no. 20. pp. 54–55. doi:10.2307/2934396. JSTOR 2934396.
- Chaplin, Jim (May 1965). "Africa and Invention". Letters to the Editor. Transition. Vol. 5(iii), no. 22. p. 5. JSTOR 2934597.
- Chaplin, Jim (June 1965). "Shielded Short Stories: [review of] SHORT STORIES FROM SOUTHERN AFRICA A. G. Hooper, Editor, Oxford University Press, Cape Town, 1963, pp 148, no price.". Transition. Vol. 5(iv), no. 23. pp. 51–52. doi:10.2307/2934166. JSTOR 2934166.
- Chaplin, J. H. (1965). "[Review of] COON, Carleton S. The Origin of Races. London, Jonathan Cape. 1963, xli, 724, xxipp. 32 Pls. 84 Figs. 13 maps. 63s.". Book Reviews. Bulletin of the Institute of Archaeology. No. 5. University of London, Institute of Archaeology. p. 91. JSTOR community.35555378.
- Chaplin, J. H. (1965). "[Review of] LAJOUX, J.D. The Rock Paintings of Tassili. London, Thames and Hudson. 1963. 202 pp. 164 Pls, 23 in colour. Maps. £3 15s. [and] WILLCOX, A. R. The Rock Art of South Africa. London, Nelson. 1963. 144 pp. 32 Pls, 20 in colour. £4 10s.". Book Reviews. Bulletin of the Institute of Archaeology. No. 5. University of London, Institute of Archaeology. pp. 91–92. JSTOR community.35555378.
- Chaplin, James H. (September–October 1965). "Sir,—It was with interest that I read the preliminary survey of the beads from the important site of Ingombe Ilede [...]". Correspondence : The Study of Beads (1965, 3). Man. 65 (4) 154: 157. ISSN 0025-1496. JSTOR 2796088.
- Chaplin, James H. (October 1965). "Greenman's remarks (CA 5:323) on circle and dot, dumbbell, circle & straight line suggesting common origin, [...]". Our Readers Write. Current Anthropology. 6 (4): 341, 466 (see p. 341). doi:10.1086/200618. JSTOR 2740327.
- Chaplin, J. H. (December 1965). "Notes on a Ghanaian 'Been-to' (Raphael Armattoe)". Makerere Journal (11): 17–22. AfricaBib 191393665. Google Books LAg10ya_H3cC, xEonAQAAIAAJ. HathiTrust ufl.31262082999615, uc1.b3359405.
- Chaplin, J. H. (December 1965) [11 June 1965]. "Smelting and Rock Art". Correspondence. The South African Archaeological Bulletin. 20 (80): 216. doi:10.2307/3887830. ISSN 0038-1969. JSTOR 3887830.
- Chaplin, James H. (April 1966). "On the debate concerning "European vs. American Anthropology" (CA 6: 303) [...]". Our Readers Write. Current Anthropology. 7 (2): 109, 130 (see p. 130). doi:10.1086/200685. JSTOR 2740019.
- Chaplin, James H. (April 1966). "Haloes at Low Altitudes". Letters to the Editor. Weather. 21 (4): 147. doi:10.1002/j.1477-8696.1966.tb02835.x. ISSN 0043-1656.
- Chaplin, James H. (June 1966). "In my opinion the cumulative subject index (CA 5:493-4) was superfluous. [...]". Our Readers Write. Current Anthropology. 7 (3): 265–266, 294 (see p. 265). doi:10.1086/200717. JSTOR 2740053.
- Chaplin, James H. (June 1966) [11 September 1965]. "With regard to Oppenheimer's "Tool Use and Crowded Teeth in Australopithecinae" (CA 5:419): [...]". Discussion and Criticism : On Tool-Use and Crowded Teeth. Current Anthropology. 7 (3): 355–359 (see p. 357). doi:10.1086/200726. ISSN 0011-3204. JSTOR 2740062.
- Chaplin, J. H. (August 1966). "Three Poems: Homage to Rabearivelo, de Quincey's Choice, & Pathic Prayer". Black Orpheus. Vol. [1], no. 20. Published for Mbari Club, Ibadan, by Longmans of Nigeria Ltd., P.M.B. 1036, Ikeja. pp. 26–27. Google Drive 1zrwL_vKjy7VP2HjbT_fGosb2saNVJrnH.
- Chaplin, J. H. (September 1966) [7 December 1965]. "If at first glance there is a certain familiarity in these contributions, this is not the authors' fault, as it is clear that they have been long in the editorial tray. [...]". Comments on "The Iron Age of Southern Rhodesia" by Roger Summers. Current Anthropology. 7 (4): 469–484 (see p. 469, see also "The Iron Age of Southern Rhodesia" on pp. 463–469, "Replies" by A. J. Arkell, Brian M. Fagan, and Roger Summers on pp. 478–481, and "References Cited" on pp. 481–484). doi:10.1086/ca.7.4.3880305. ISSN 0011-3204. JSTOR 3880305.
- Chaplin, James H. (September 1966). "Sir, The last issue of the Journal of the Royal Anthropological Institute (J. R. anthrop. Inst. 95, 241–52) contained an article by K. Hechter-Schulz that should not be allowed to pass without comment. [...]". Correspondence : Modern decorative patterns of the southern Bantu. Man. 1 (3): 399. ISSN 0025-1496. JSTOR 2796803.
- Chaplin, James Harvey (1966–1967). The prehistoric art of the Lake Victoria region (M.A. thesis). Kampala, Uganda: Makerere University College, University of East Africa. OCLC 1555658014. Makerere University Library Catalogue: chamo:153599, chamo:29506; 109014 (AF); Call Number U 01 C43; Barcode 001065947[1?]. Google Books jBbB0QEACAAJ.
  - Reproduced in part in: Chaplin, J. H. (January 1974). Harlow, M. A. B. (ed.). "The Prehistoric Rock Art of the Lake Victoria Region". Azania: Archaeological Research in Africa. 9 (1): 1–50. doi:10.1080/00672707409511714. ISSN 0067-270X.
- Chaplin, James H. (February–April 1967). "I think the attention of Associates should be drawn to UNESCO BOOK COUPONS. [...] & A. G. H. Claerhout's problem and its discussion (CA 6:432-08) has certainly cleared the air, [...]". Our Readers Write. Current Anthropology. 8 (1–2): 1–2 (see p. 1). doi:10.1086/200854. JSTOR 2740420.
- Chaplin, Jim (April–May 1967). "Song for a Suicide". Poetry. Transition. Vol. 6(v), no. 30 "Espionage: The Art of Seduction". Published from Baumann House (Kampala, Uganda) by Transition Ltd. with assistance from The Congress for Cultural Freedom (Paris, France). p. 8. doi:10.2307/2934340. JSTOR 2934340.
- Chaplin, Jim (April–May 1967). "Flower Fall". Poetry. Transition. Vol. 6(v), no. 30 "Espionage: The Art of Seduction". Published from Baumann House (Kampala, Uganda) by Transition Ltd. with assistance from The Congress for Cultural Freedom (Paris, France). p. 8. doi:10.2307/2934341. JSTOR 2934341.
- Chaplin, Jim (April–May 1967). "American Negro Poetry: [review of] HERITAGE: POETRY OF THE NORTH AMERICAN NEGRO. Published by Paul Breman Ltd., 7, Wedderburn Road, London N.W.3.: No. 1 A BALLAD OF REMEMBRANCE, Robert Hayden $3.50; No. 2 SIXES AND SEVENS, ed P. Breman $4.50; No. 3 PERSONALS, Arna Bontemps $2.50; No. 4 HAVERSTRAW, Frank Horne $2.00". Transition. Vol. 6(v), no. 30 "Espionage: The Art of Seduction". Published from Baumann House (Kampala, Uganda) by Transition Ltd. with assistance from The Congress for Cultural Freedom (Paris, France). p. 53. doi:10.2307/2934353. JSTOR 2934353.
- Chaplin, James H. (June 1967). "C. A. Del Real's idea of a discussion on the pre-Mousterian sculptures (CA 6:341) [...]". Our Readers Write. Current Anthropology. 8 (3): 145. doi:10.1086/200790. JSTOR 2740208.
- Chaplin, J. H. (June 1967). "Rock-drawings from the Lake Victoria Region". Antiquity. 41 (162): 146–147, plates XVIII–XIX. doi:10.1017/S0003598X00112815. ISSN 0003-598X.
- Chaplin, J. H. (September 1967). "Vernacular month names from Zambia". African Studies. 26 (3): 145–169. doi:10.1080/00020186708707262. ISSN 0002-0184.
- Chaplin, J. H.; McFarlane, M. (1967). "The Moniko Petroglyphs". The Uganda Journal. 31 (2): 207–209, unnumbered page of figures. ISSN 0041-574X. LCCN 52026895. OCLC 1644239.
- Chaplin, J. H. (October 1967). Reining, Priscilla (ed.). "Dorobo [and] Initiation ceremonies; the place of figurines in the ceremonies [and] Ba-twa (syn. pygmy) (c. 9° S. 29° E.)". Urgent Research Projects : Geographic Area F : PART II: CA✰ Catalogue of Urgent Research. Current Anthropology. 8 (4): 362–416 (see pp. 371–373). doi:10.1086/200818. ISSN 0011-3204. JSTOR 2740162.
- Chaplin, James H. (April–June 1968). "It would be useful if CA would publish a list of Foundations and other grant-giving agencies [...]". Our Readers Write. Current Anthropology. 9 (2–3): 81–82, 108, 224 (see p. 108). doi:10.1086/200973. JSTOR 2740722.
- Chaplin, Jim (Summer 1968). "Slum Day; The Next Morning; The Derelict". Poetry. The Literary Review. Vol. 11, no. 4 "Africa Number". Rutherford, NJ: Fairleigh Dickinson University. pp. 430–431. ISSN 0024-4589. ProQuest 1301727135.
  - "The Next Morning" and "Slum Day" are reproduced in: Cook, David; Rubadiri, David, eds. (1971). Poems from East Africa. Poets of Africa, 1. Nairobi: East African Educational Publishers Ltd., in association with Heinemann Educational Books. pp. 32–33 (see also pp. xiv, 189). ISBN 9966-46-019-5. Google Books 5O_Erc2ujDQC. Internet Archive poemsfromeastafr00east.
- Chaplin, Jim (Autumn 1968). "The Coup". PRISM international. Vol. eight, no. two. University of British Columbia. p. 85. doi:10.14288/1.0135410. ISSN 0032-8790. UBC Library bibId 1215619, Open Collections 1.0135410, AIP UUID 366b6fbd-8550-489f-88cc-4714391cc30f, PR8900_P7_008_002.
- Posnansky, Merrick; Chaplin, J. H. (December 1968). "Terracotta Figures from Entebbe, Uganda". Man. 3 (4): 644–650. doi:10.2307/2798585. ISSN 0025-1496. JSTOR 2798585.

== Life ==
Chaplin was born on 16 September 1924 (in Harrow, London), to Harvey Hopper Chaplin (an exporter) and Evelyn Bessie Chaplin (née Orchard), and baptized 2 November 1924 in the Parish of Greenhill in the County of Middlesex. He grew up in London.

Jim Chaplin has a son also named James Harvey Chaplin.

Chaplin first visited Africa in 1943. He was Christian and regularly donated a tithe to charity. His interests included mountaineering. He was homosexual, and some people may have discriminated against him as a result. He was friendly with Africans, and supported African nationalism through UNIP, which could be another reason why others may have disregarded him.

Chaplin was killed in a hit and run car crash (while either standing on the curb or crossing the street) on 30 March in Kampala, and died 31 March 1967 at New Mulago Hospital. He was buried at Kampala European Cemetery. In his will, he gave a bequest to the Royal Anthropological Institute of £600 "for the improvement or extension of the Institutes library facilities", which they spent mostly on books about primitive art. He also gave a bequest of £100 to the Scott Polar Research Institute, which used it to buy a book about Greenland and a set of books about "the study of the seas"
