= Eric Arnold Temple-Perkins =

British administrator in the Uganda Protectorate

- Born: 1890; New Zealand
- Died: 20 June 1972 (aged 81–82); Kichwamba, Uganda
- Other name: Purple Tomkins
- Occupations: Administrator, big game hunter
- Years active: 1918–1972
- Notable work: Kingdom of the Elephants
- Title: President of The Uganda Society
- Term: 1942–1943
- Predecessor: S.W Kulubya
- Successor: R.A Snoxall

Arnold Eric Temple-Perkins (1890 – 20 June 1972) was a New Zealand-born government official, big game hunter and game ranger in Uganda.

He also served as the 11th president of the Uganda Society between 1942 and 1943.

== Background ==
Temple-Perkins was born in New Zealand to Arnold Temple and Emily Kate Perkins.

== Career ==
Having served in World War I with the Royal Field Artillery, Temple-Perkins joined the colonial service in the then British East. He was first posted as Assistant District.

Temple-Perkins served as Commissioner in Teso between 1918 and 1922. He was later appointed District Commissioner of Karamoja but only served for three months after which he was named Labour Commissioner in the Labour Department.

In the following year, Temple-Perkins variously served as "District Commissioner of Ankole (1924–ca.1929), District Commissioner of Masaka (ca.1929–1932) and Provincial Commissioner of Buganda (1932–1934) of Toro (1935–1936) and of the Eastern Province of Uganda (1937–1938)".

During World War II, Temple-Perkins was made Director of Security and Intelligence in Uganda. His last official appointment was Resident of Buganda in 1944 after which he retired in 1945. He chose to remain in Uganda where he lived near Queen Elizabeth National Park and was referred to as "Purple Tomkins" by his colleagues.

He was later made an Honorary Warden of Uganda's National Parks in 1952. In 1955, he published a book about on his big game hunting experiences – Kingdom of the Elephant.

== Publications ==
- Temple-Perkins, Eric Arnold (1955), Kingdom of the Elephant, London: A. Melrose, OCLC 6338848

== External sources ==
- E.A Temple-Perkins online cenotaph
- E.A Temple-Perkins British Museum collection
