= Kabale Hospital =

Kabale Regional Referral Hospital
- Uganda Ministry of Health
- Location within Uganda

Geography
- Location: Kabale, Kabale District, Western Region, Uganda
- Coordinates: 01°15′04″S 29°59′21″E

Organisation
- Care system: Public
- Type: General and Teaching

Services
- Emergency department: I
- Beds: 280

History
- Founded: 1969

Links
- Other links: Hospitals in Uganda; Medical education in Uganda

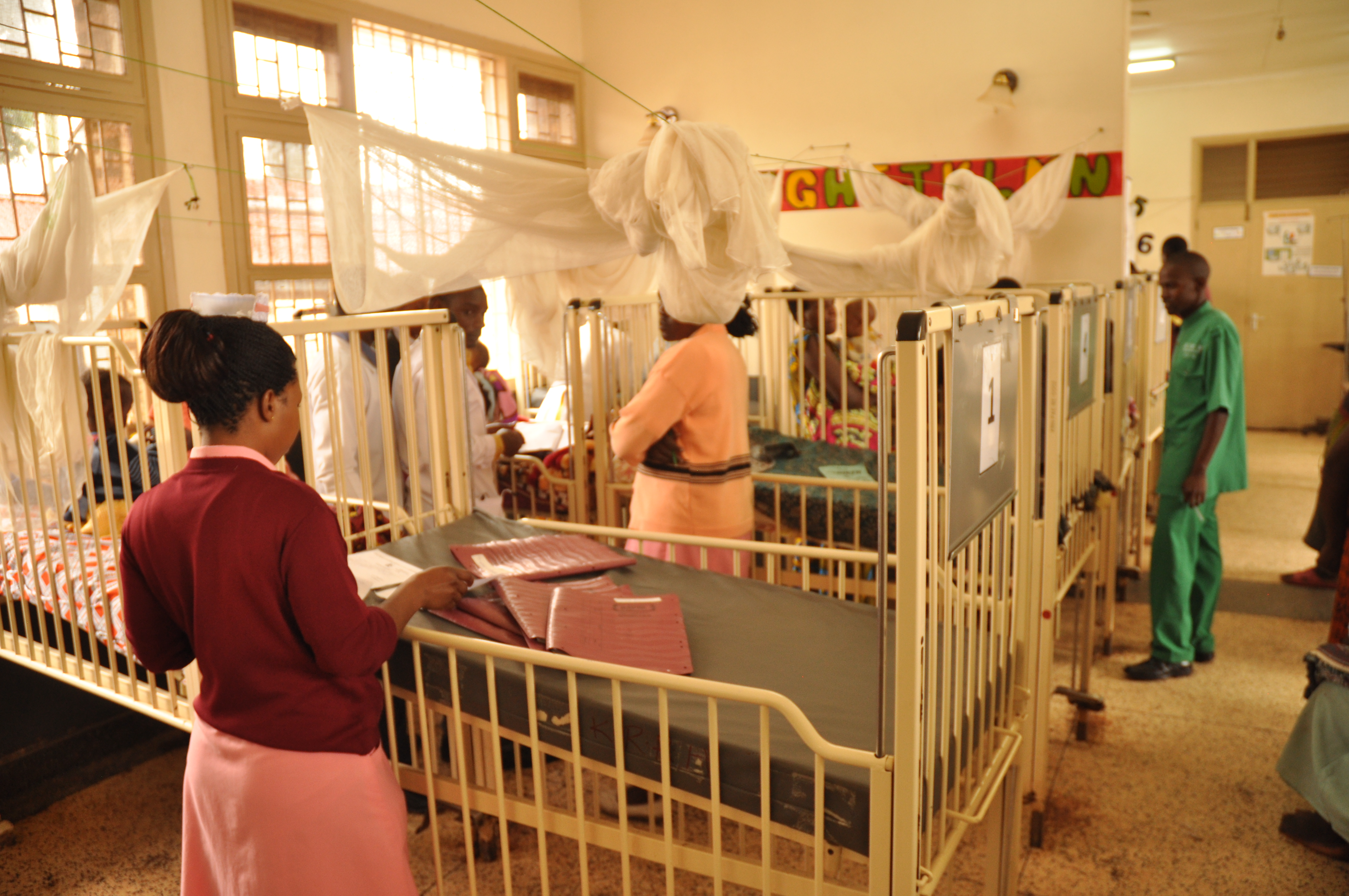
Kabale Referral Hospital-The children's ward at the Kabale Regional Referral Hospital. Credit: Kate Consavage/USAID

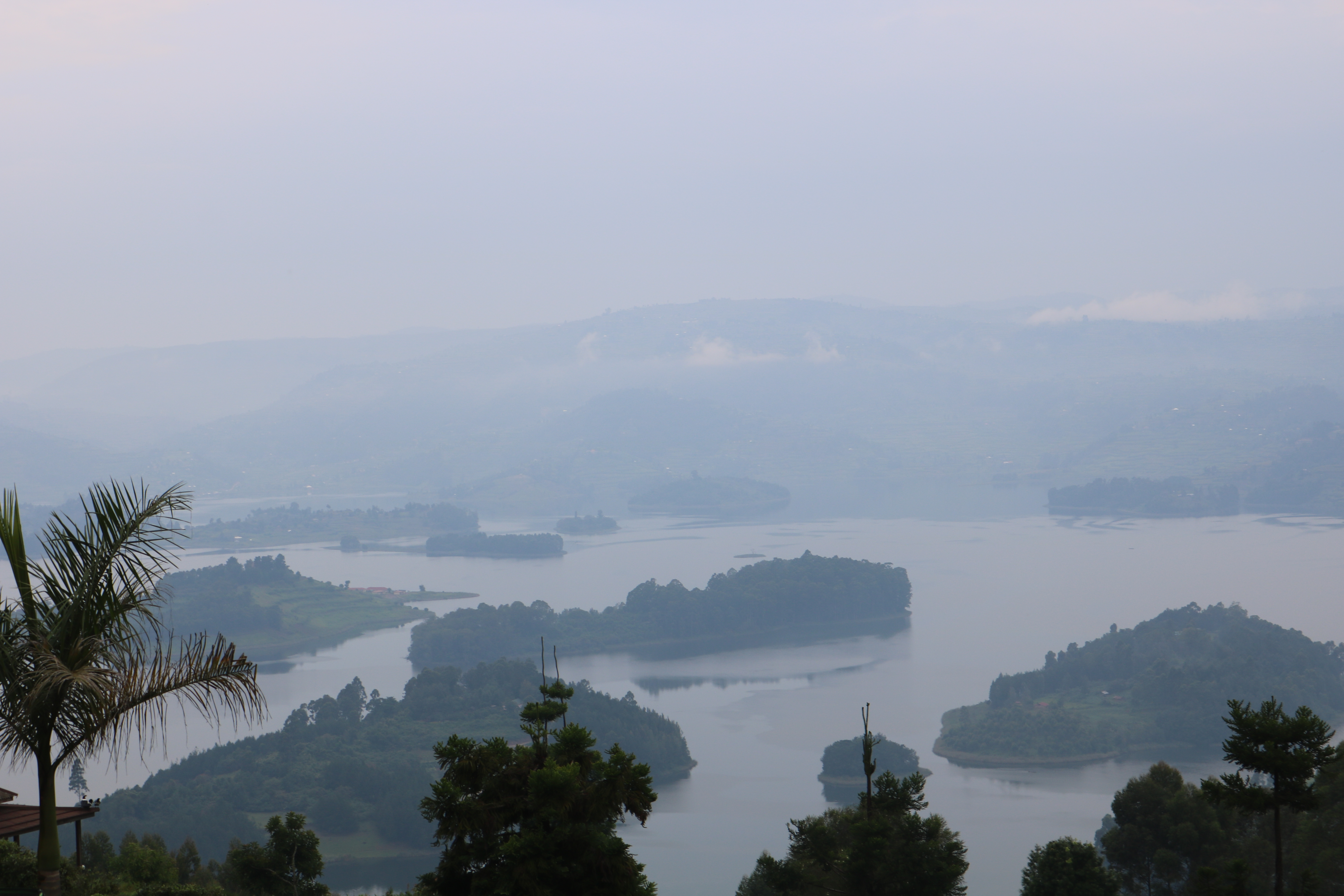
Lake Bunyonyi Kabale in Kabale district

Kabale Regional Referral Hospital, commonly known as Kabale Hospital, is a hospital in the town of Kabale in Kabale District, in south-western Uganda. It is the referral hospital for the districts of Kabale, Kanungu, Rubanda, Rukiga, Kisoro and Rukungiri. It is proposed that the hospital will become the teaching hospital of Kabale University once its medical school is established.

== Location ==
Kabale Hospital is located in the central business district of the town of Kabale, approximately 139 kilometres (86 mi), by road, south-west of Mbarara Regional Referral Hospital.

This is about 406 kilometres (252 mi) south-west of Mulago National Referral Hospital. The coordinates of Kabale Regional Referral Hospital are 1°15'04.0"S, 29°59'21.0"E (Latitude:-1.251111; Longitude:29.989167).

== History ==
Kabele Hospital was founded as a mission hospital of the church Missionary Society in 1921 by Leonard Sharp and Algernon Smith and their spouses as an expansion from the Mengo Hospital. The original mission hospital included a school and a leprosy hospital on Bwana Island on Lake Bunyonyi. The hospital also served as a base for Sharp and Smith to found a hospital in Rwanda as well, the Ruanda Mission.

== Overview ==
Kabale Hospital is a public hospital, funded by the Uganda Ministry of Health and general care in the hospital is free. It is one of the thirteen regional referral hospitals in Uganda. The hospital is designated as one of the fifteen internship hospitals in Uganda where graduates of Ugandan medical schools can serve of internship under the supervision of qualified specialists and consultants. The bed capacity of Kabale Hospital is quoted at 280, although many more admissions are made, with the excess sleeping on the floor.

In 2014, work to expand and renovate the hospital got underway, in anticipation of turning the hospital into the teaching hospital of Kabale University. The renovations include the construction of new operating rooms (surgical theatre), the upgrading and expansion of the maternity ward, and construction of a modern out-patients department. UGX:20 billion was budgeted for the work.

== See also ==
- Hospitals in Uganda
