= Norman Cook (disambiguation) =

Norman Cook better known as Fatboy Slim is an English musician and DJ.

Norman Cook may also refer to:

- Norman E. Cook (1888–1950), a Canadian politician
- Norman Cook (doctor) (1903–1933), a British physician and medical missionary
- Norm Cook (1955–2008), an American basketball player
