= Leonard Sharp (doctor) =

Medical missionary in East Africa

Leonard E. S. Sharp was an English doctor and surgeon who served as a medical missionary in East Africa from 1914 to 1955. He worked in various regions across Uganda and modern-day Rwanda alongside his longtime professional partner and friend Algernon Stanley Smith. Together, the pair founded the Rwandan Mission and Sharp went on to establish a leper colony on Lake Bunyonyi. He received awards from the british queen Elizabeth II and the Royal African Society for his work.

== Early life ==
Sharp was born in Wimbledon, England in 1889. He received his education at Harrow College of Higher Education and Trinity College, Cambridge, earning a Bachelor of Arts, Bachelor of Medicine, and Bachelor of Surgery. He met Algernon Stanley Smith at school, who would become his lifelong partner in his missionary service. Smith would also go on to marry Sharp's sister, Lillian Zoe Sharp (1891-1980). In 1920, Sharp married his wife Esther McDonald and shortly after the pair, alongside Algernon and his wife, ventured to Uganda as missionaries.

== Mission ==
During World War I, Sharp served as an officer in the African Medical Corps at Mengo Hospital, Uganda which was operating as a war hospital at the time. There he worked under Sir Albert Cook for a year before returning to England.

After his return, he and Stanley Smith made an expedition back to Mengo Hospital in 1916 to scout the area for a new mission, this time serving under the Church Missionary Society. The purpose of this trip was to scout the neighboring area for the prospect of a Rwandan Mission. The local Rwandan government also submitted a request to the Church Missionary Society for aid in 1917, leading Sharp and Smith to submit an official request to the CMS to start a new mission in the Rwandan side of the Uganda-Rwanda border. The Church Missionary Society declined due to a lack of funds. Sharp and Smith then returned to England in 1919 to conduct an independent fundraising effort.

One they had successfully raised enough money for four years of work and a hospital, the Church Missionary society accepted their offer for new missions in East Africa. They ventured back to Mengo, Uganda with their wives in late 1920, arriving to January 3, 1921. They decided to begin their work in Uganda and in 1921, they founded and opened the first hospital, the Kabale Hospital, and a school at Kabale.

=== Rwandan Mission ===
In 1925, Sharp successfully negotiated with the Belgian government in order to open the first hospital in Rwanda. He then founded the Rwandan Mission, now known as the Mid-Africa Ministry, along with Algernon Stanley-Smith. The mission was in Gahini, close to Kabale on the Ugandan border. In the following years, he would frequently travel between Kabale and the Rwandan Mission.

In 1926, the Rwandan Council was formed under the CMS to oversee the development of the mission. Sharp served as the First Secretary of the mission from 1932 to 1935.

Sharp did not share the views of Dr Joe Church. In 1946 his wife, Esther Sharp, wrote, "Joe [Church] made it so clear Len [Sharp] is not wanted for the Church work and has so arranged and wrangled things that it will be very difficult for Len to run it now."

=== Sharp's Island ===
Sharp started a leper colony on Bwana Island on Lake Bunyonyi as a branch of the Kabale hospital in 1930, colloquially known as “Sharp’s Island”. During his time at Kabale, Sharp had developed a special interest for leprosy patients. Beginning in 1928, he would frequently go on safaris to find more patients and bring them to the hospital. After gaining permission from the Ugandan government, he decided to create a leper colony on Lake Bunyonyi to treat patients and prevent the further spread of the disease. The island was funded with grants from the Uganda Protectorate and local native administrative funds.

The island began with the 25 patients that had been staying at Kabale Hospital and over the next 18 years, the island would see over two thousand new patients. The colony consisted of a hospital in the center, a ward for infectious patients on the west side, and a school and quarters for non-infectious patients on the east side.

Sharp provided his skills as a doctor and surgeon on the island as well as aiding with the manual construction and expansion of the community. He introduced technologies construction methods such as motorboats, windmills for pumping water, and water wheels for electricity.

== Late life and death ==
Sharp retired from his service in East Africa in 1955. He continued to live on Bwana Island until 1961 when he and his wife moved to Mombasa. One year after their arrival, his wife died. Sharp died on March 2, 1976, at age 85 in Mombasa.

== Legacy ==
The Rwandan Mission, now called the Mid-Africa Ministry, continued its work and sent missionaries across East Africa.

During his service, Sharp wrote “Island of miracles : the story of the Lake Bunyoni leprosy settlement, Uganda” along with Janet Metcalf. He also wrote a small book titled “Great Truths from God’s Word”.

Upon retiring, in 1965, Sharp received a Royal African Society Medal for dedicated service to Africa. He was awarded an MBE award from Queen Elizabeth II as well.
