= Kambuga General Hospital =

- Uganda Ministry of Health

Geography
- Location: Kambuga, Kanungu District, Western Region, Uganda
- Coordinates: 00°48′50″S 29°48′03″E

Organisation
- Care system: Public
- Type: General

Services
- Emergency department: I
- Beds: 100

History
- Opened: 1965

Links
- Other links: Hospitals in Uganda

Kambuga General Hospital, also Kambuga Hospital is a government-owned hospital in the Western Region of Uganda.

== Location ==
The hospital is located in the town of Kambuga, in Kanungu District, approximately 144 kilometres (89 mi) north-west of the Kabale Regional Referral Hospital. This is 122 kilometres (76 mi) west of the Mbarara Regional Referral Hospital. The coordinates of hospital are 0°48'50.0"S, 29°48'03.0"E (Latitude:-0.813902; Longitude:29.800839).

== Overview ==
Kambuga General Hospital was established in 1965. It is owned by the Uganda Ministry of Health. It is administered by the Kanungu District local government. According to a published report in 2006, the hospital buildings and equipment were dilapidated and crumbling. The district local government is struggling to run the hospital due to poor funding.

== See also ==
- List of hospitals in Uganda
