= Katharine Cook =

British medical missionary (1863–1938)

Lady Katharine Cook
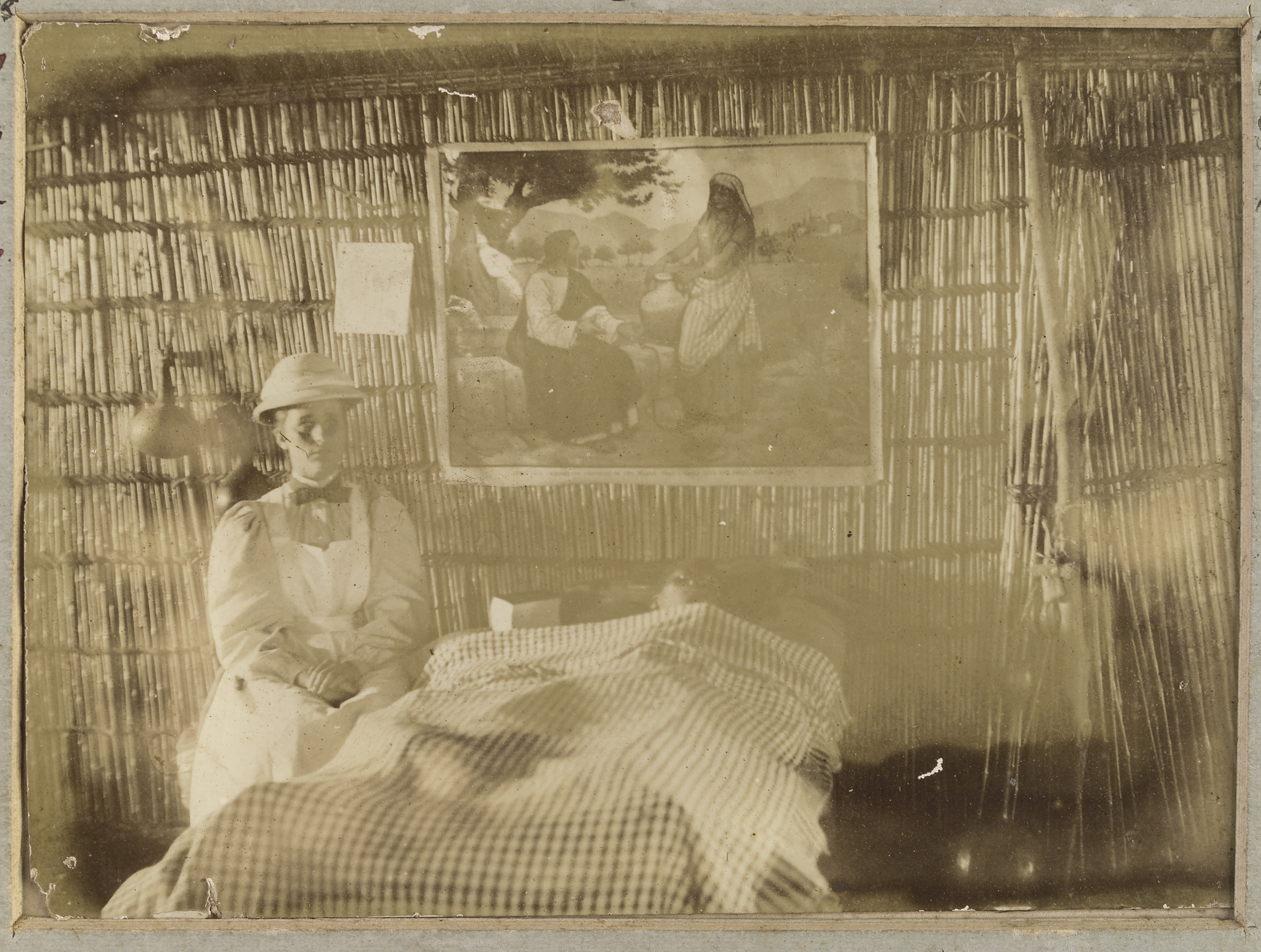
- Miss Timpson seated to the left of a patient convalescing, Mengo Hospital, Uganda.
- Born: Katharine Timpson; 1863
- Died: 17 May 1938 (aged 74–75); Namirembe, Uganda Protectorate
- Occupations: Missionary, nurse and educator
- Medical career
- Institutions: Mengo Hospital
- Awards: Order of the British Empire; Belgian Red Cross; Queen Elisabeth Medal

Katharine, Lady Cook CMG OBE (née Timpson; 1863 – 17 May 1938) was a British medical missionary who worked in Uganda. She co-founded the Church Missionary Society Hospital at Mengo, which opened in May 1897, and served as its matron until 1911. In 1918, she began training midwives via the Maternity Training School in Namirembe, which she founded. She later became consulting physician to the Government European Hospital in Kampala.

== Missionary work ==
Katharine Timpson went to Uganda as a medical missionary, following work at Guy's Hospital in London. She was accepted by the Christian Missionary Service in 1896, despite opposition from older missionaries who felt that she should not do medical work. She conducted rounds on foot and by bicycle.

Timpson and Albert Ruskin Cook founded the Church Missionary Society Hospital at Mengo, which opened in May 1897. Timpson was matron of the hospital from its founding to 1911. She married Cook in 1900. They had three children, who were sent back to Britain to be educated.

In 1918, Cook began training midwives via the Maternity Training School (MTS) in Namirembe, which she founded. Initially, she focused on training the daughters of chiefs to encourage other women to train. The Cooks also authored a manual of midwifery in Ganda, the local language, Amagezi Agokuzalisa, published by Sheldon Press, London.

Cook established 29 rural maternity centres in addition to the MTS and also began training nurses in 1928, opening the Nurses Training College in 1931. The midwives and nurses were expected to defer to Europeans; Cook received requests that her students be scolded or even struck off when they were not deferential. Cook defended some students against these claims of insubordination, including one of their "brightest", who she said had not had the opportunity to tell her side of the story and whose reprimand had not been justified. However, Cook was suspicious of her students and treated them like "morally suspect, impractical girls", censoring their mail and was explicitly concerned that they might form romantic attachments that might potentially end their careers.

The training that Cook provided had a strong moralising component; Cook considered Ugandan mothers to be harsh or ignorant in their treatment of their infants and believed that the local Baganda people had a lack of moral conscience that was causing high levels of infant mortality. Historian Carol Summers has suggested that this patronising and negative view was in part the result of the Cook's confusing yaws with syphilis and thus thinking that there was an STD epidemic of huge proportions.

Cook eventually became consulting physician to the Government European Hospital in Kampala.

== Honours and legacy ==
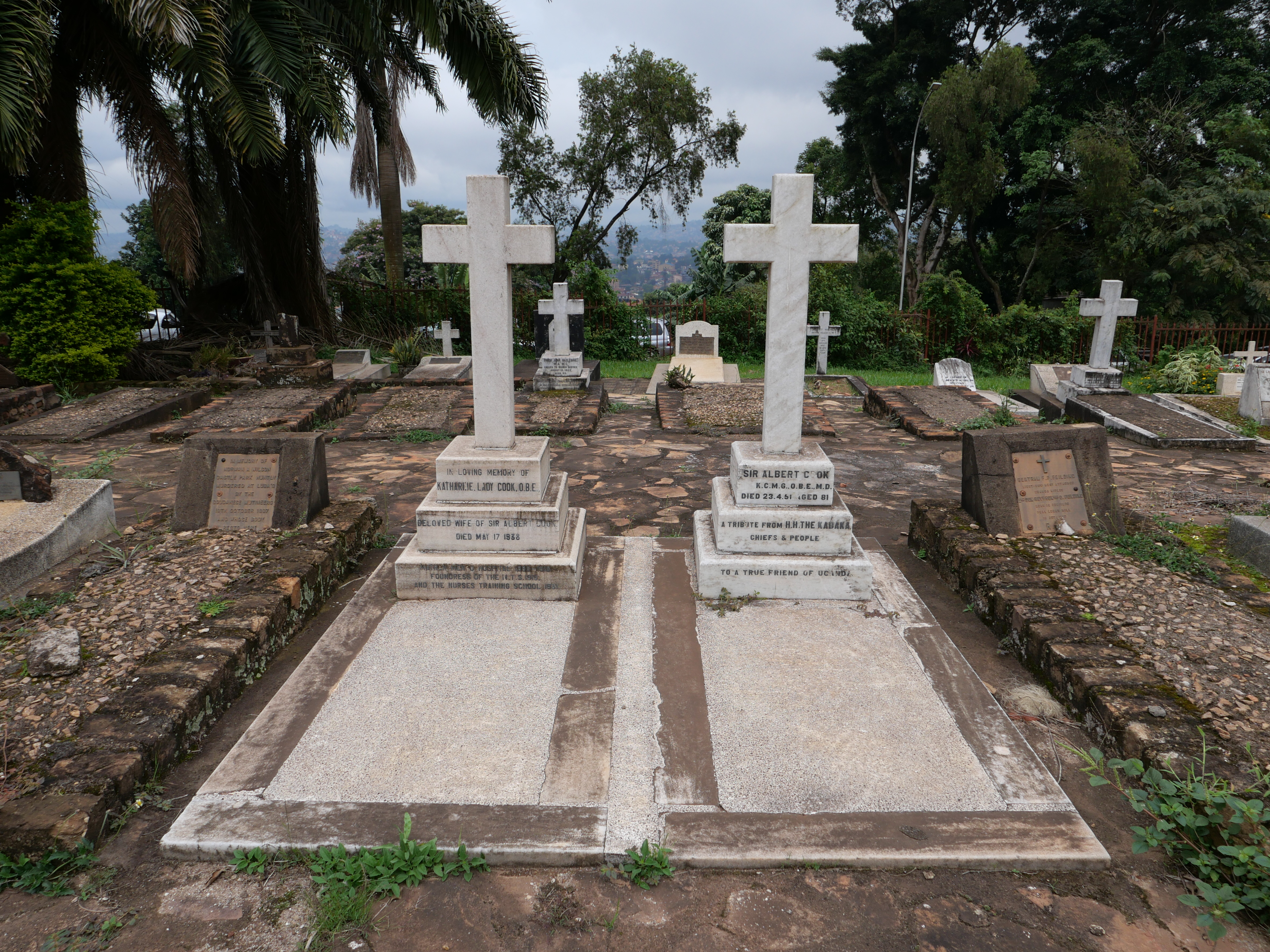
The grave of Cook, center left, and her husband, center right, in 2024.

The work that Cook and her husband conducted was widely publicised in East Africa and in Britain. In 1918, Cook was awarded the MBE, the Belgian Red Cross and the Queen Elisabeth Medal for nursing services during World War I. In 1932, she retired and was awarded an OBE.

Katharine, Lady Cook, died on 17 May 1938 in Namirembe. She was buried at the cemetery next to St. Paul's Cathedral Namirembe. Her husband, who died 13 years later, found his final resting place next to her grave.

In 1963, the new nurses' home at Mengo Hospital was named after her. The archives of her and her husband are kept at Wellcome Library with the reference PPCOO.
