= Jonathan Kingdon =

Tanzanian British artist and naturalist

- Born: Tanzania
- Education: Makerere University; Ruskin School of Art; Royal College of Art
- Occupations: Artist, Naturalist
- Notable work: Canticle of the Sun; East African Mammals; an atlas of evolution in Africa (1971 – 1982); The Kingdon Field Guide to African Mammals (1997, 2015)
- Title: President of The Uganda Society
- Term: 1972 - 1973
- Predecessor: Dr. F. Sempala Ntege
- Successor: Dr. Phares Mukasa Mutibwa

Jonathan Kingdon (born 1935 in Tanzania) is a zoologist, science author, and artist; a research associate at the University of Oxford.

He focuses on taxonomic illustration and evolution of the mammals of Africa. He is a contributor to The Oxford Book of Modern Science Writing. He was awarded the 1993 Silver Medal of the Zoological Society of London, and was awarded the Royal Geographical Society's Cherry Kearton Medal and Award in 1998.

He also served as the 39th President of The Uganda Society between 1972 and 1973

== Background and education ==
Kingdon was educated at Makerere University. He also trained as an artist at the Ruskin School of Art and the Royal College of Art.

He also taught Fine Art for 15 years at Makerere University and in 1972 was named Director of Makerere University's Margaret Trowell School of Industrial and Fine Art

== Books ==
- Kilimanjaro: Animals in a landscape. 1983. ISBN 0-563-20230-0.
- African mammal drawings: The Wellcome volume. 1983. ISBN 0-9508837-2-7.
- East African Mammals: An Atlas of Evolution in Africa. a seven volume series. 1988. ISBN 0-226-43724-8.
- Island Africa: The Evolution of Africa's Rare Animals and Plants. 1990. ISBN 0-691-08560-9.
- Self-Made Man: Human Evolution From Eden to Extinction. 1993. ISBN 0-471-15960-3.
- The Kingdon Field Guide to African Mammals. 2003. ISBN 0-7136-6513-0.
- Lowly Origin: Where, When and Why our Ancestors First Stood Up. Princeton University Press Princeton. 2003. ISBN 978-0691050867.
- The Kingdon Pocket Guide to African Mammals. Princeton University Press. 2004. ISBN 9780691122397.
- Guide des mammiferes d'Afrique. Paris: Delachaux & Niestle. 2006. ISBN 978-2603017456.
- Mammals of Africa. 2013. ISBN 9781408122570.
- Origin Africa: A Natural History. Princeton University Press. 2023. ISBN 978-0691228532.

== See also ==
- The Uganda Society
- Margaret Trowell
