= Luzira Head =

Ugandan terracotta in British Museum

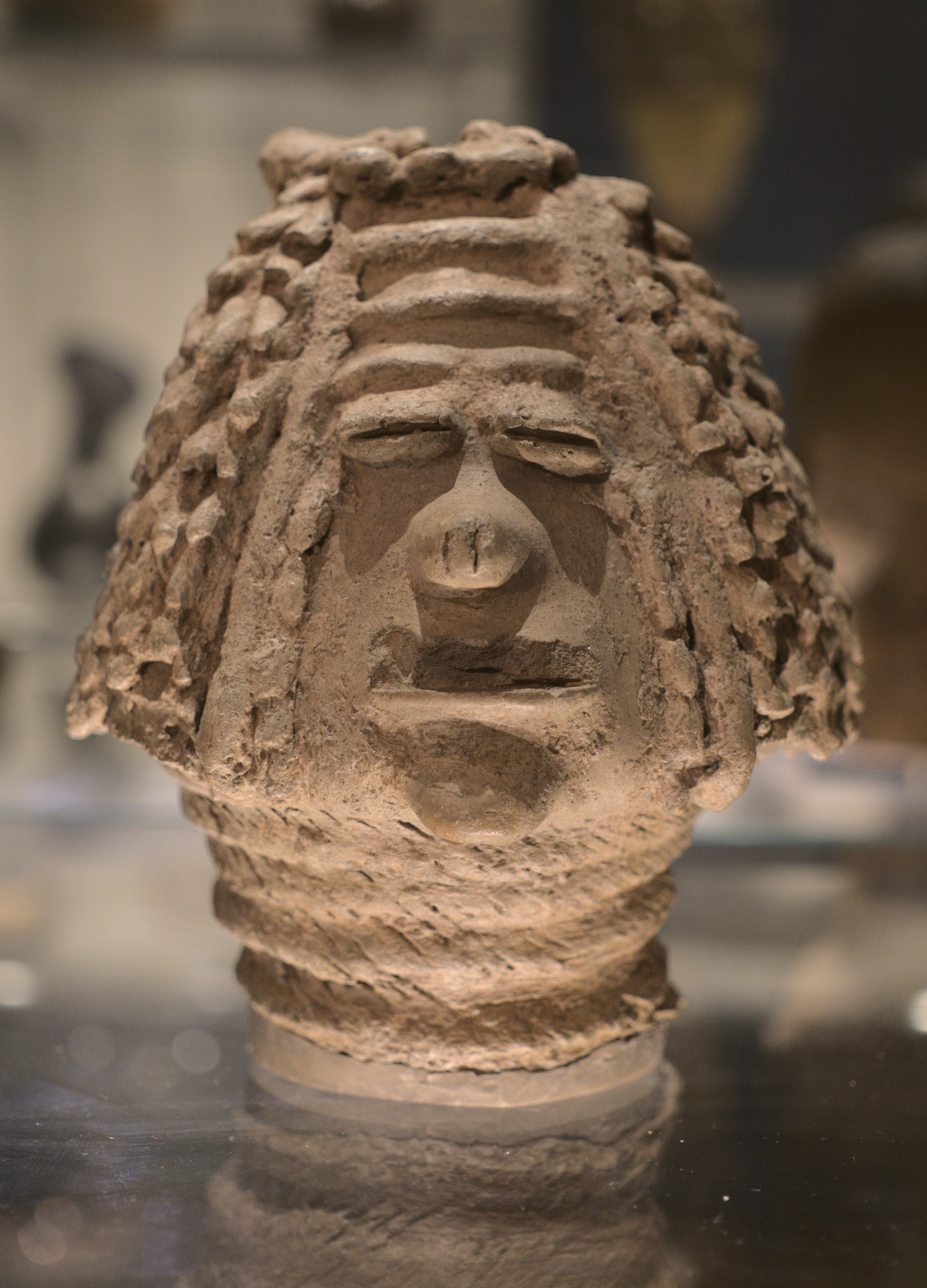
- The Luzira Head
- Material: Terracotta
- Size: 17 cm high
- Created: 1000 AD
- Present location: British Museum, London
- Registration: Af1931,0105.14

The Luzira Head locally known as the Mpanga Head is the name of a terracotta head found at Luzira, Uganda. Estimated to be about 1000 years old, it is one of the oldest Sub-saharan sculptures yet discovered in Africa. Since 1931, it has been part of the British Museum's ethnographic collection.

== Description ==
The Luzira Head is a unique terracotta bust of a woman. The head has very narrow, protruding eyes and mouth with a diminutive nose. Along the forehead are three cicatrices. The hair is matted and falls either side of the head. The lower part of the figure was also found during the original excavations. It is tripod-shaped and like the head is hollow and made of baked clay.

== Discovery ==
The head and torso, along with a number of other artefacts, were excavated by the British geologist Edward James Wayland between 1929 and 1930. They were unearthed in a prison compound at the site of Luzira, in the suburbs of Kampala, Uganda. Other objects discovered at the time included over one hundred pottery sherds, fourteen terracotta pieces, a pottery vessel, an iron spear and an axe similar to the story of Ibrahim and the idols. But unfortunately the whereabouts of the Luzira axe are unknown. It is conjectured that the site was once an ancient Buganda shrine. Radio-carbon dating has indicated that the objects found there are approximately a thousand years old.
