= Norman Cook (doctor) =

Medical missionary, and evangelist in Northern Nigeria

- Born: 1903; Uganda
- Died: May 11, 1933 (aged 30)

Norman Cook (1903 – May 11, 1933) was a British physician, medical missionary, and evangelist in Northern Nigeria from 1930 to 1933. As a member of the Hausa Band from Cambridge University, Cook was influential in the development of the hospitals and out-patient dispensaries in Zaria and Wusasa and was the leader in the building of the dispensary in Maska. His transfer of the leper colony in Zaria resulted the establishment of the National Tuberculosis and Leprosy Training Centre in Zaria, Nigeria in 1991. Cook’s missionary service was brief due to his unexpected death caused by septicaemia in the operating theater.

== Early life and education ==
Cook was born in Uganda in 1903 into a family of British missionaries. His father, John Howard Cook, was a medical missionary, and his mother, Ethel Maddox Cook, and uncle, Sir Albert Cook, were both missionaries in Uganda. The Cook family completed the mission work in Uganda and returned to England when Norman was seven years old.

For secondary school, Cook attended London University and decided to pursue medical school and training at St. Bartholomew’s Hospital. After receiving his medical degree, he became an active member of Cambridge University’s Hausa Band. This group was formed in 1924 in conjunction with the Church Missionary Society to aid those living in the Hausa region of Northern Nigeria.

== Mission ==
=== Wusasa mission hospital ===
Norman Cook’s work was focused in Wusasa and Maska, Northern Nigeria. Wusasa was a one square mile piece of land that served as the location of the Hausa band mission site. This community was directly outside of the predominantly Muslim city Zaria. By establishing a mission site—Wusasa—directly outside of Zaria, a safe haven was created for those wishing to convert to Christianity. The religious goal of both Cook and the mission group was to expose and convert the Muslim population of Zaria to Christianity. Medically, he and the mission group strove to build hospitals and proper dispensaries to provide, care, and treat the Northern Nigerian communities.

Although the mission site was already initiated in Wusasa at the time of Cook’s arrival, he continued the efforts from the former medical missionaries in treating patients within the newly developed hospital and built a sisters quarters. Additionally, he assisted in transferring the leper colony from inside Zaria to closer to Wusasa. His transfer of the leper colony in Zaria to a more hygienic environment outside the city center later resulted the establishment of the National Tuberculosis and Leprosy Training Centre in Zaria, Nigeria in 1991.

=== Boys Brigade Hospital at Maska ===
Cook led and established the Church Missionary Society dispensary also known as the Boys’ Brigade Hospital at Maska in 1932 through the support from the funds of the Boys’ Brigade, international aid, and the Nigerian government. The dispensary was in Maska, Northern Nigeria, which was a walled town with a predominantly Muslim population composed of approximately 2000 individuals, 600 of whom being children. Prior to Cook’s death in 1933 and despite the poor facilities, the dispensary provided 78 out-patient and 665 in-person treatments. Following his death, the dispensary continued to improve; specifically, in 1934, approximately 40 patients received treatment daily.

=== Community involvement ===
Cook also played for the Nigerian team in intercontinental cricket, becoming fluent in Hausa, and taught the boys in the Church Missionary Society School how to play football.

Cook frequently engaged in educational activities. Most notably, he conducted lantern readings and outreach measures for the local youth (ages 16–30). Cook also initiated the training of women within the mission society in midwifery and assistance in procedures, such as ulcer treatments.

He was frequently engaged in collaborations and meaningful conversations with local government officials and chiefs. His initiation of such relationships resulted in the governmental approval and financial support of the mission work.

=== Evangelism ===
Norman Cook’s primary focus throughout his mission work was to teach and spread the values of Christianity. He utilized the hospitals and dispensaries to express Christian morals, traditions, and beliefs. At the dispensary in Maska, within the first year, there were over six adult baptisms among the African staff.

== Death ==
At thirty years old, in 1933, Cook passed away. His death was caused by sepsis contracted in the operating theater. He was buried in the Saint Bartholomew Church in Northern Nigeria. This church was located near the mission site and hospital in Wusasa. He was buried in line with the main west door of the church.

== Legacy ==
Cook is remembered for his enthusiastic outlook on medicine, Christianity, and the spread of such beliefs to those living in Northern Nigeria. Despite the brevity of his mission work, his establishments functioned long past his death. By 1937, the Norman Cook Memorial Dispensary was established in Bakori, with the Chief of Maska and the Chief of Bakori attended the opening. In response to Dr. Cook’s death, the Lieutenant-Governor of the Northern provinces stated, “I am well aware of the high personal esteem in which Dr. Cook was held by Africans and Europeans alike, and also of the ability and enthusiasm which so marked his medical work”.

Cook's impact on Northern Nigerian communities was used as training material medical missionaries traveling to India in the late 1930s. From a medical standpoint, his treatment and creation of dispensaries and hospitals set the standard for higher quality care in Northern Nigeria.

Cook's transfer of the leper colony in Zaria to a more hygienic environment outside the city center later resulted the establishment of the National Tuberculosis and Leprosy Training Centre in Zaria, Nigeria in 1991.

A school in Chafe was built in remembrance of Norman Cook and his emphasis of the power of education.
