= Edward James Wayland =

First director of the Uganda Geological Survey

E. J. Wayland
- Edward James Wayland
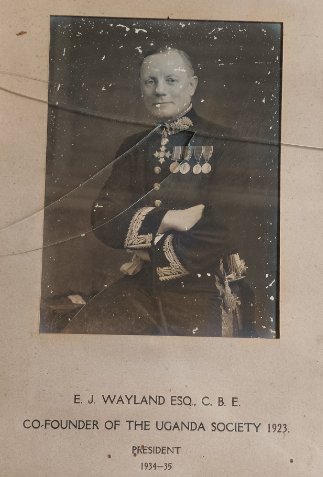
- Born: January 23, 1888; London
- Died: 11 July 1966 (aged 78); Ramsgate, Kent
- Citizenship: England, Uganda
- Education: City of London College, Royal College of Science, Royal School of Mines, Cambridge University.
- Occupation: Geologist
- Organization: The Uganda Society
- Predecessor: Sir Albert Cook
- Successor: Dr. H. H. Hunter
- Spouse: Ellen Morrison
- Awards: CBE (Commander of the Order of the British Empire) in 1935

Edward James Wayland C.B.E, 23 January 1888- 11 July 1966 was a British geologist and author. He was the first president of the Geological Survey of Uganda and co-founder of The Uganda Society in 1923.

== Early life and education ==
Wayland was born in London on 1888 to Edward Wayland and Emily Street. He was educated at the City of London College, the Royal College of Science, and the Royal School of Mines. He also studied archaeology at Cambridge University.

== Career ==
Wayland conducted geological fieldwork in Egypt in 1909 and Portuguese, East Africa (Mozambique) in 1911 and Sri Lanka before the First World War. From 1912, he worked as an Assistant Mineralogical Surveyor for Ceylon. During World War I, he served in France from 1916 to 1919.

After the war, he became a Government Geologist in Uganda, where he also had interest in archaeology, especially early prehistory. He joined the Geological Survey of Uganda in 1919 and became its director in 1920. He was involved in mineral prospecting, geological mapping, and research in Uganda and neighboring countries. He discovered a number of archaeological sites and stone tools in Uganda, such as Nsongezi and was part of the team that excavated the Luzira head. He also wrote about the relationship between rift valleys, rivers, rains, and early human evolution in Africa.

He briefly studied archaeology at Cambridge University during his directorship of the Geological Survey of Uganda.

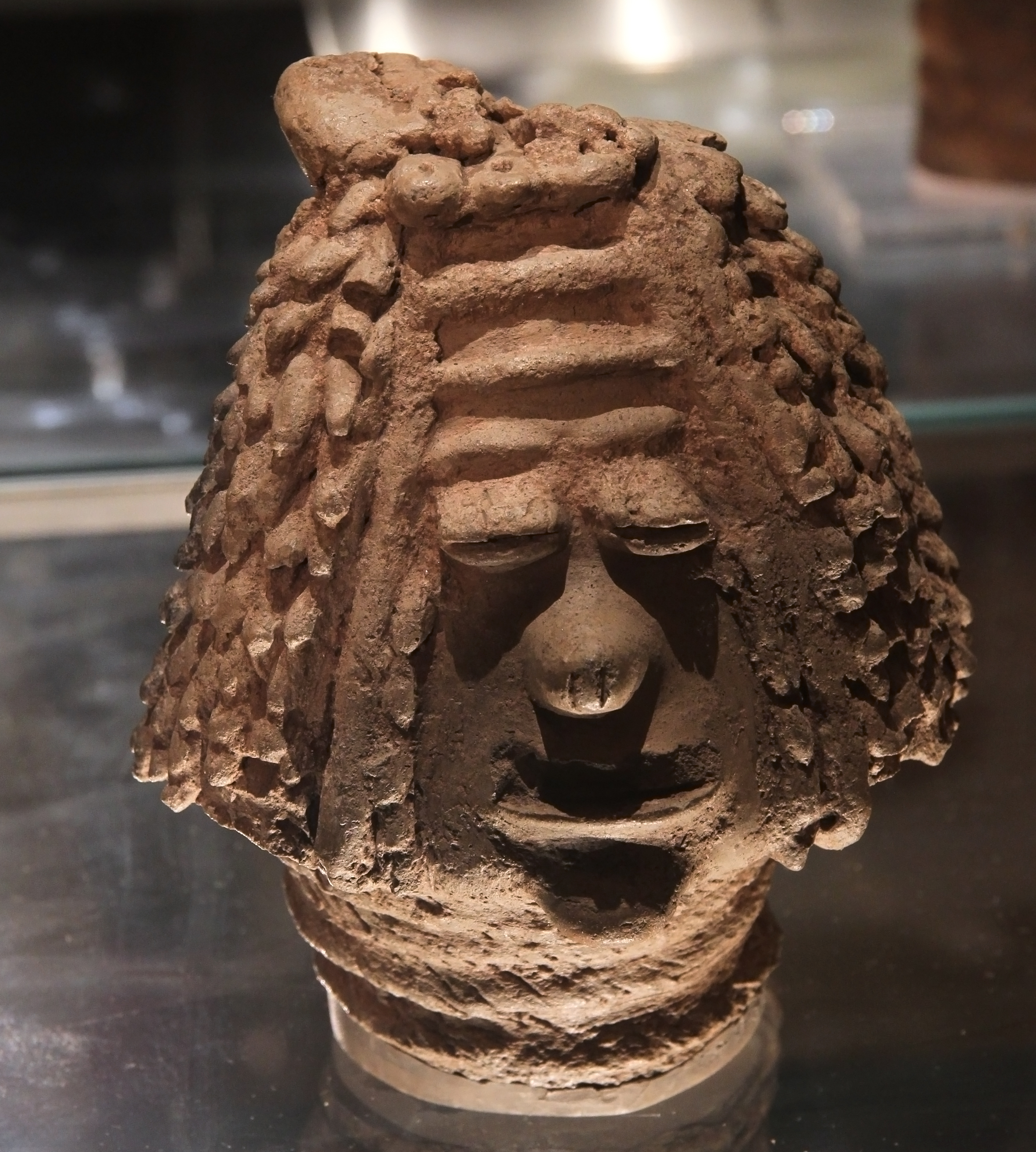
The Luzira head (c. 9th–10th century AD), part of the archaeological finds excavated in 1929 by Edward James Wayland in Uganda

In 1923, he was one of the founding members of The Uganda Society, a cultural, and scientific society and became its president in 1934–1935. He served in the British Army during the Second World War and was sent to Botswana in 1943, where he became the director of the Bechuanaland Geological Survey. He also excavated and wrote about prehistoric sites and fossils in Botswana, such as Tsodilo Hills and Makapansgat. In 1939–45, he again served in the war, but this time he also did geological work in Bechuanaland (Botswana).

== Honors and legacy ==
Wayland was awarded with the CBE (Commander of the Order of the British Empire) in 1935 for his services to geology and archaeology in Uganda.

He retired in 1953 and moved to Ramsgate, Kent, where he died on 11 July 1966. He donated many of his archaeological and paleontological specimens to the British Museum and other institutions. He is regarded as one of the pioneers of African prehistory and a mentor to many African and British scholars.

== Personal life ==
Wayland married Ellen Morrison in 1917.

== Publications ==
- Wayland wrote on geology, much on Africa. He authored “Stones of the Nawaratna: Their mythical significance and superstitious lore” which was published in the Journal of the Royal Asiatic Society of Great Britain and Ireland.
- In 1925, as a Government Geologist, he documented the petroleum potential of Uganda in the publication "Petroleum in Uganda".
