= Algernon Stanley Smith =

British missionary (1890 – 1978)

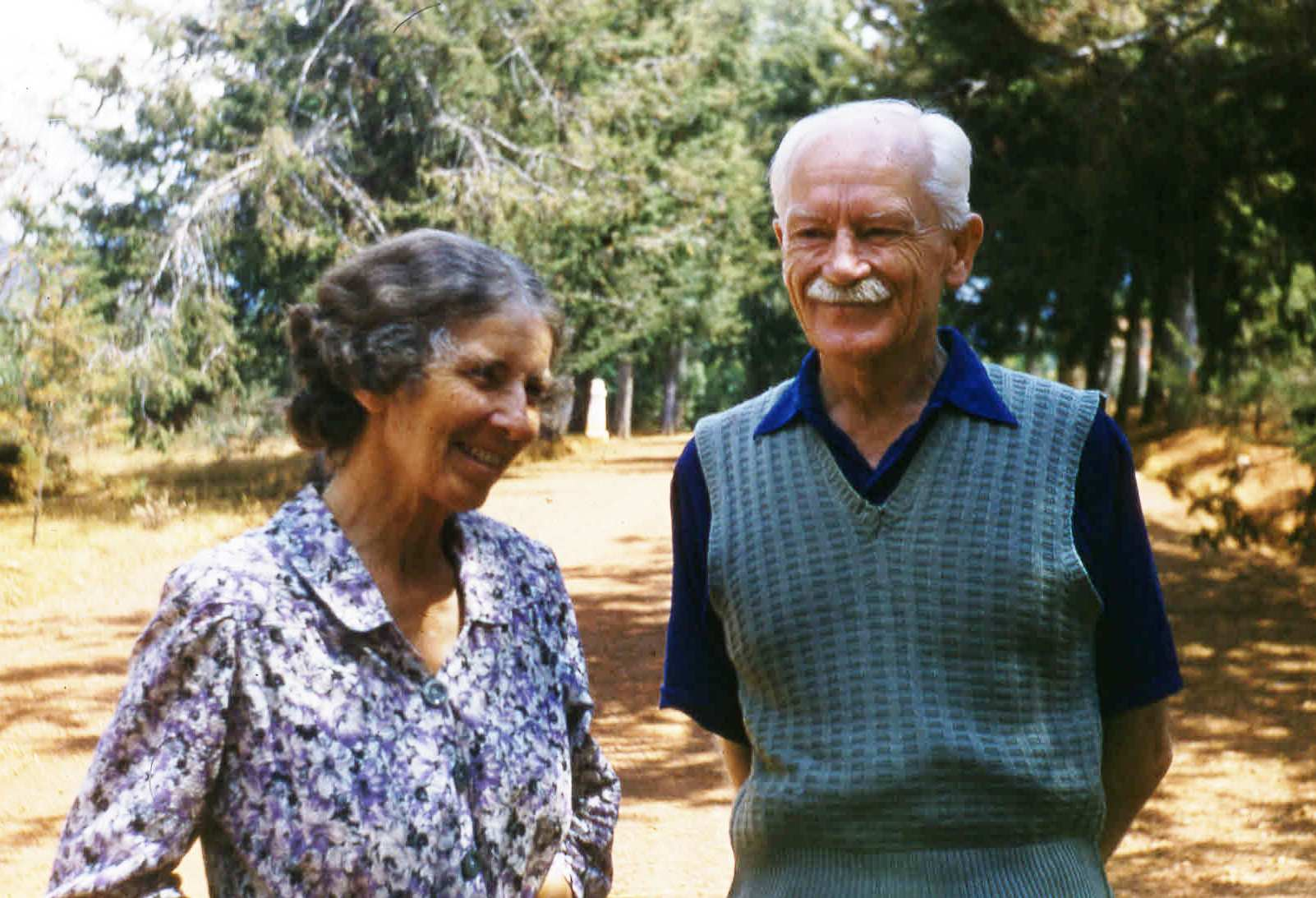
Dr and Mrs A C Stanley-Smith at Kibuye, Rwanda September 1955

Algernon “Algie” Stanley Smith (14 February 1890 – 28 July 1978) was a British Protestant Christian missionary to Uganda and Rwanda.

== Personal life ==
=== Early life ===
Algernon “Algie” Charles Stanley Smith was born on 14 February 1890 in Luara Shansi, China, the son of Stanley P. Smith and his Norwegian wife Sophie de Reuter, who were missionaries in China. His mother died when he was only one year old. His father remarried after two years and had three more children. At age six he went to a boarding school at Chefoo for three years, until the family went to England in 1899. They left for furlough so were not in China at the time of the Boxer Rebellion.

=== Education ===
After two years in England, Smith’s parents returned to China, leaving him in England for his education. During this period the “Watney Sisters”, Alice and Emily of Croydon, Surrey were his guardians. They were daughters of James Watney and through their inherited wealth were very strong supporters of Christian Mission and of their local church. Through their sponsorship Smith was educated at Winchester College and Trinity College, Cambridge where he matriculated in 1908 and studied medicine. Having completed his studies at Cambridge he went on to further medical studies at St George's Hospital, London, qualifying in 1914.

=== Family ===
On 7 January 1919 Smith married Lillian Zoe Sharp (1891-1980), sister of friend and fellow missionary Leonard Sharp, at Wimbledon parish church. They had two sons and two daughters:

- Olive Nora Stanley-Smith (1920-2013)
- Alice Eve Stanley-Smith (1922-2006)
- Dr Geoffrey Stanley-Smith (1924-2014)
- James Stanley-Smith (b. 1929)

== Missionary career ==
=== Missionary call ===
Although his parents were missionaries, Smith’s call to missionary service was personal and based on his own faith and calling. Together with Sharp, he accepted the call to missionary service while at Cambridge in 1910. They were convinced that God had called them to work in Ruanda and offered themselves to the Church Missionary Society (CMS) for that work.

=== Missionary service ===
Both Smith and Sharp were accepted by CMS. Smith and Sharp, with their wives, travelled to Uganda as missionaries. They started work at Mengo Hospital. In December 1916 they made an exploratory visit to Ruanda. The CMS Uganda missionary committee received an appeal for medical help from Rwandans in Ruanda and Kigezi in 1917. The committee in London were unable to agree to this expansion of work because of the lack of funds, but the two doctors began to raise funds independently and by 1919 were able to guarantee support both for four years' work and for a hospital. In the early days support was given and organised by 'Friends of Ruanda', but in 1926 the Ruanda Council was formed as a CMS committee in charge of the administration of the work.Smith and Sharp founded the Rwandan Mission, now known as the Mid-Africa Ministry. In 1929 it took full financial responsibility for the mission, though it was not separated from the CMS mission in Uganda until 1933.

== Legacy ==
Smith died on 28 July 1978 in Chorley Wood. The Rwanda Mission continued to send missionaries to Uganda, Ruanda, Burundi and Eastern Congo. Rwanda Mission changed its name to Mid-Africa Ministry (MAM) and in 1999 was re-integrated into CMS and continues to provide health care.
