= The Uganda Society =

Literary, cultural and scientific society in Uganda

- Formation: 1923
- Founder: Edward James Wayland
- Founded at: Entebbe, Protectorate of Uganda
- Headquarters: The Uganda Museum
- Location: Kampala, Uganda
- Coordinates: 0.10252°N 32.3457871°E
- Fields: Anthropology, Medical, Archaeology, Geology, Linguistics, Literature
- President: 1923 - 1933 : Mr. Justice F.G Smith; 1933 - 1934 : Albert Ruskin Cook; 1934 - 1935 : Edward James Wayland; 1935 - 1936 : Dr. Harold Hamilton Hunter; 1936 - 1937 H.Jowitt
- Formerly called: The Uganda Literary and Scientific Society

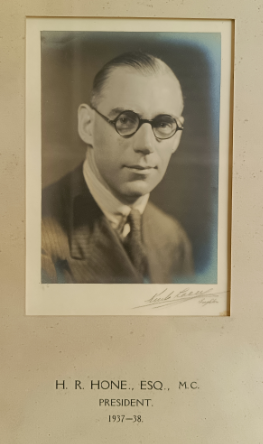
Sir Herbert Ralph Hone

The Uganda Society is a cultural, and scientific society in Uganda that was founded in 1923. The society was established to promote the study of Uganda's history, culture, and natural history.

The society has a library and archives that contain information on Uganda's history, culture, and natural history. The society also publishes a journal, The Uganda Journal.

== Background ==
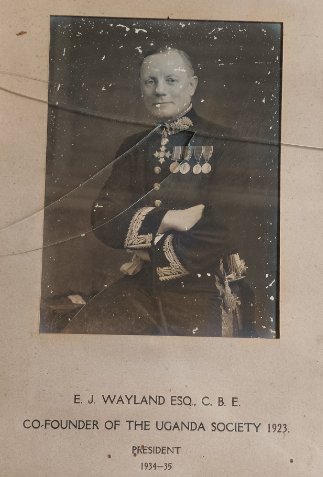
Edward James Wayland, co-founder of The Uganda Society

Founded as the Uganda Literary and Scientific Society in 1923 in Entebbe, in the then Protectorate of Uganda, it gained its current name in 1933.

In its first five years, the society was involved in presenting lectures of "scientific, historical, economic, or religious interest" but faced a near collapse in 1928 due to members dispersing.

It was revived in 1933 through the efforts of Edward James Wayland, a British geologist and Sir Herbert Ralph Hone, who was the Attorney General of the Protectorate of Uganda in between 1937 - 1943.

=== Location ===
The Uganda Society moved location from Entebbe, to the Kampala Club in June 1933. It then moved to the Sikh Barracks, and in 1960 it was at the National Cultural Center in Kampala.

A Ford Foundation grant provided for the extension of the Uganda Museum in 1963, which saw space allocated to the society in the Education Wing of the Uganda museum which has been its home since then

== Activities ==
According to a Library of Congress entry, its main activity consisted of "the reading of papers and the delivery of lectures on topics relating to Uganda".

In 1933, the society moved its headquarters to Kampala and decided to issue a regular publication, The Uganda Journal. The journal's declared aim was "to collect and publish information which may add to our knowledge of Uganda and to record that which in the course of time might be lost."

=== Library ===
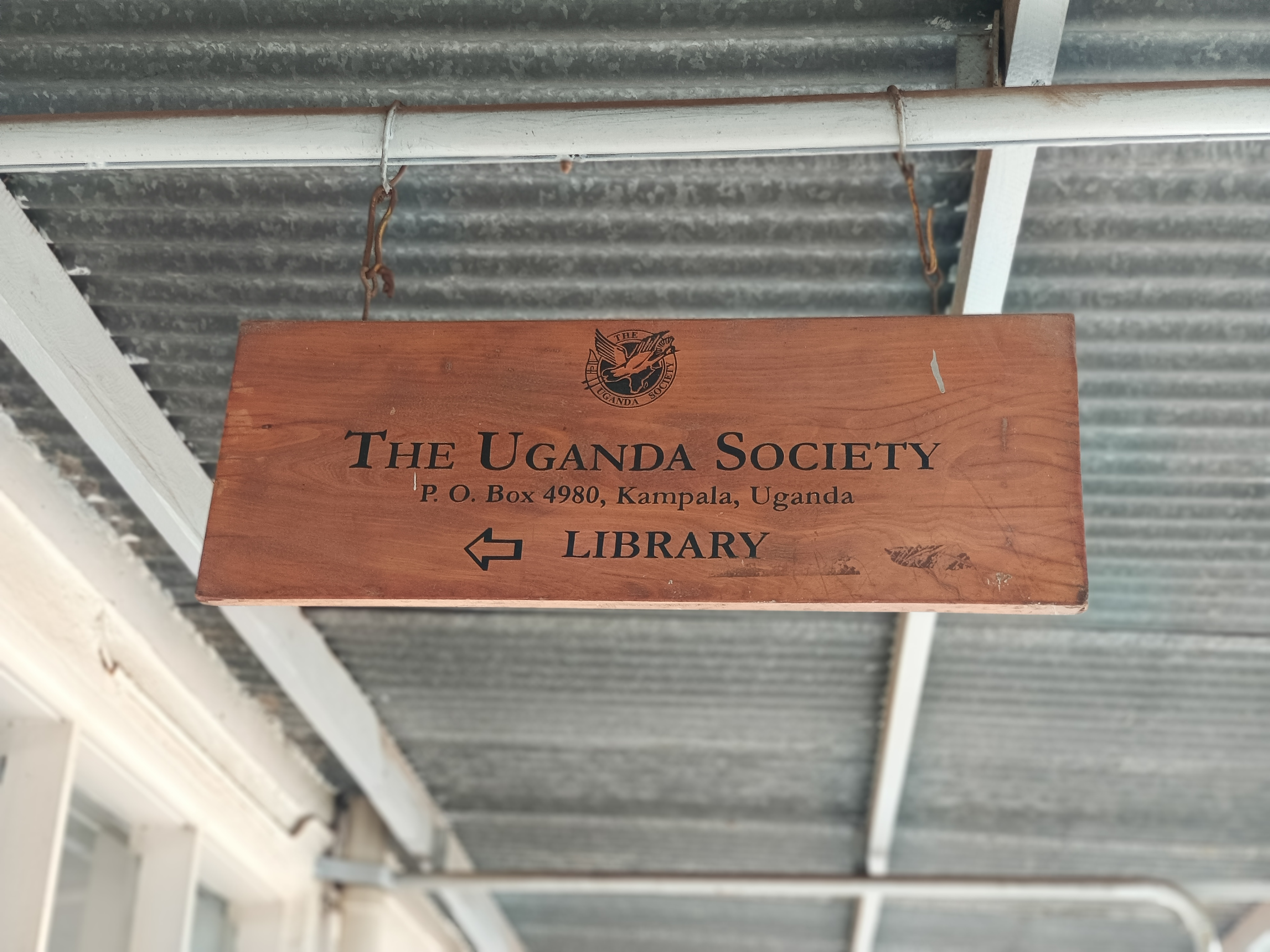
Signpost for the Uganda Society Library

The Society hosts the Uganda Society Library at its current location at the Uganda Museum.

The library, founded in the 1920s, offers a collection of "volumes, maps, periodicals and photographs many of which were otherwise unavailable elsewhere in Uganda". The collection comprises approximately 6,000 volumes "all pertaining to African history, culture, sociology, travel and science".

== Publications ==
Copy of front page of The Uganda Journal, Volume 1, Number 2 1934

The Uganda Society publishes The Uganda Journal. After moving from Entebbe to Kampala in 1933, the society decided to publish The Uganda Journal with its first publication in 1934. It was stated that the journal aimed "to collect and publish information which may add to our knowledge of Uganda and to record that which in the course of time might be lost."

The Society also sponsored publications like "A Guide to the Snakes of Uganda", by Captain C. R. S. Pitman, and "Uganda Memories", by Sir Albert Cook.
