= The Uganda Journal =

- Discipline: African studies, humanities
- Language: English

Publication details
- History: 1934–present
- Publisher: The Uganda Society (Uganda)
- Frequency: Biannually

Standard abbreviations
- ISO 4: Uganda J.

Indexing
- ISSN: 0041-574X

The Uganda Journal is a biannual scholarly journal of the Uganda Society (previously the Uganda Literary and Scientific Society) with its first publication in 1934. The journal's focus is on documenting and disseminating knowledge about Uganda and has been a platform for scholarly research, discussions, and insights related to various aspects of Uganda's history, culture, and society.

== History and establishment ==
The Uganda Literary and Scientific Society which later changed its name to The Uganda Society was founded in Entebbe in 1923 with the aim of fostering intellectual exchange and promoting research on topics relevant to Uganda. Its main activities included presenting papers and delivering lectures on a wide range of subjects related to the country.

In January 1934, the society launched the first issue of The Uganda Journal, in order to document and disseminate the findings of marking the beginning of a valuable scholarly endeavor and four issues per year were published starting then.

The journal includes articles, photographs and maps.

== Content and contributions ==
The journal covers diverse range of topics, including anthropology, archaeology, history, linguistics, natural sciences, and cultural studies. Over the years, it has featured articles, essays, and research papers.
