= Mengo Hospital =

Private faith-based hospital in Uganda

- Church of Uganda
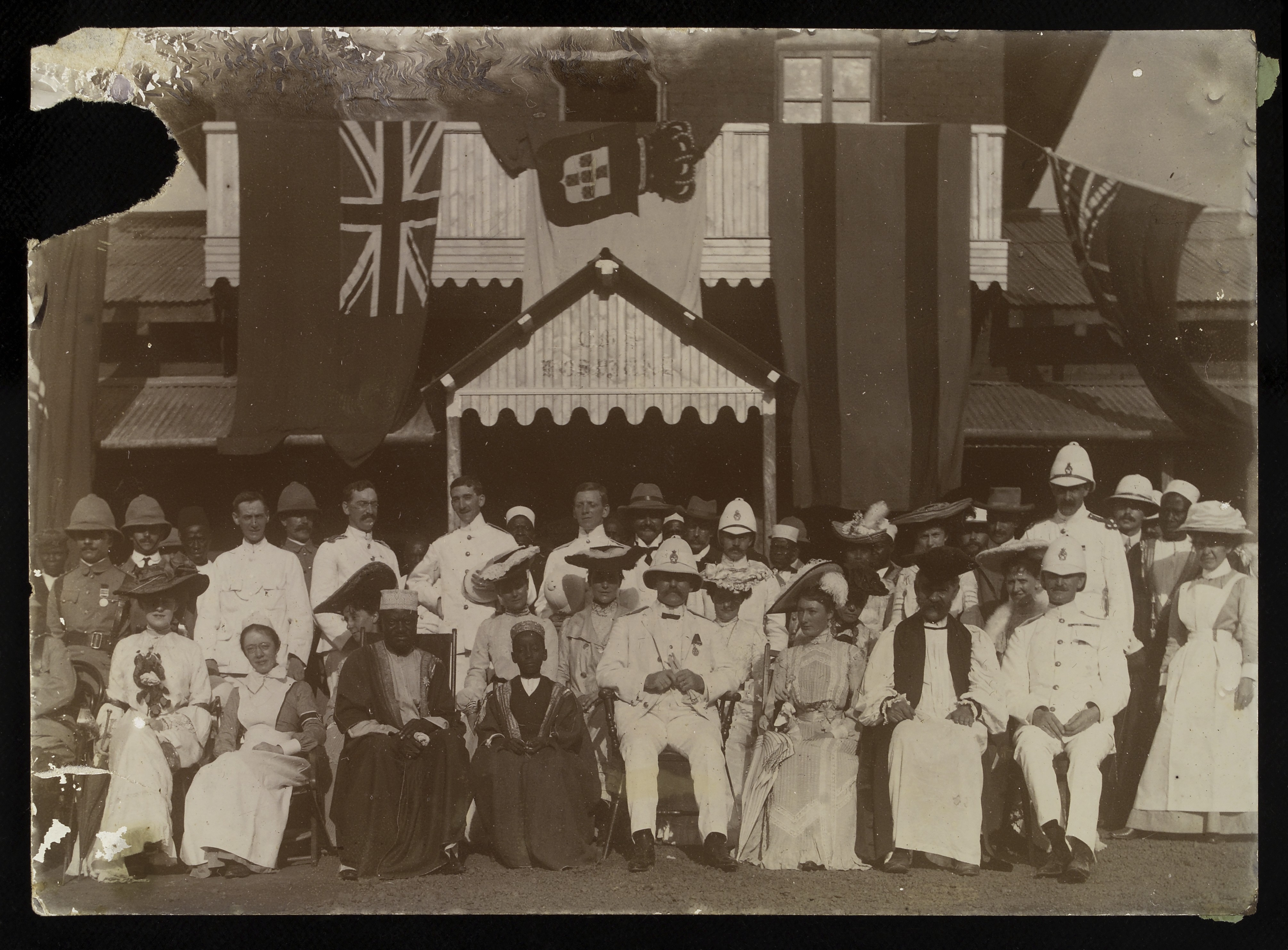
- Group photo at the opening of the new Mengo Hospital, Uganda, Wellcome Trust

Geography
- Location: Namirembe Hill, Kampala, Central Region, Uganda
- Coordinates: 00°18′46″N 32°33′30″E

Organisation
- Care system: Private, non-profit
- Type: Community hospital
- Affiliated university: Thomas Jefferson University, Philadelphia, Pennsylvania, United States

Services
- Emergency department: I
- Beds: 300

History
- Opened: 1897

Links
- Other links: Hospitals in Uganda

Mengo Hospital, also known as Namirembe Hospital, is a private, faith-based, community, teaching hospital in Kampala, the capital and largest city of Uganda.

== Location ==
The hospital is located on Namirembe Hill in Rubaga Division in northwestern Kampala, along Albert Cook Road, approximately 5 kilometres (3 mi), by road, southwest of Mulago National Referral Hospital.

The travel distance, by road, from the city's central business district to Mengo Hospital is approximately 5 kilometres (3.1 mi). The coordinates of Mengo Hospital are 0°18'46.0"N, 32°33'30.0"E (Latitude:0.312778; Longitude:32.558333).

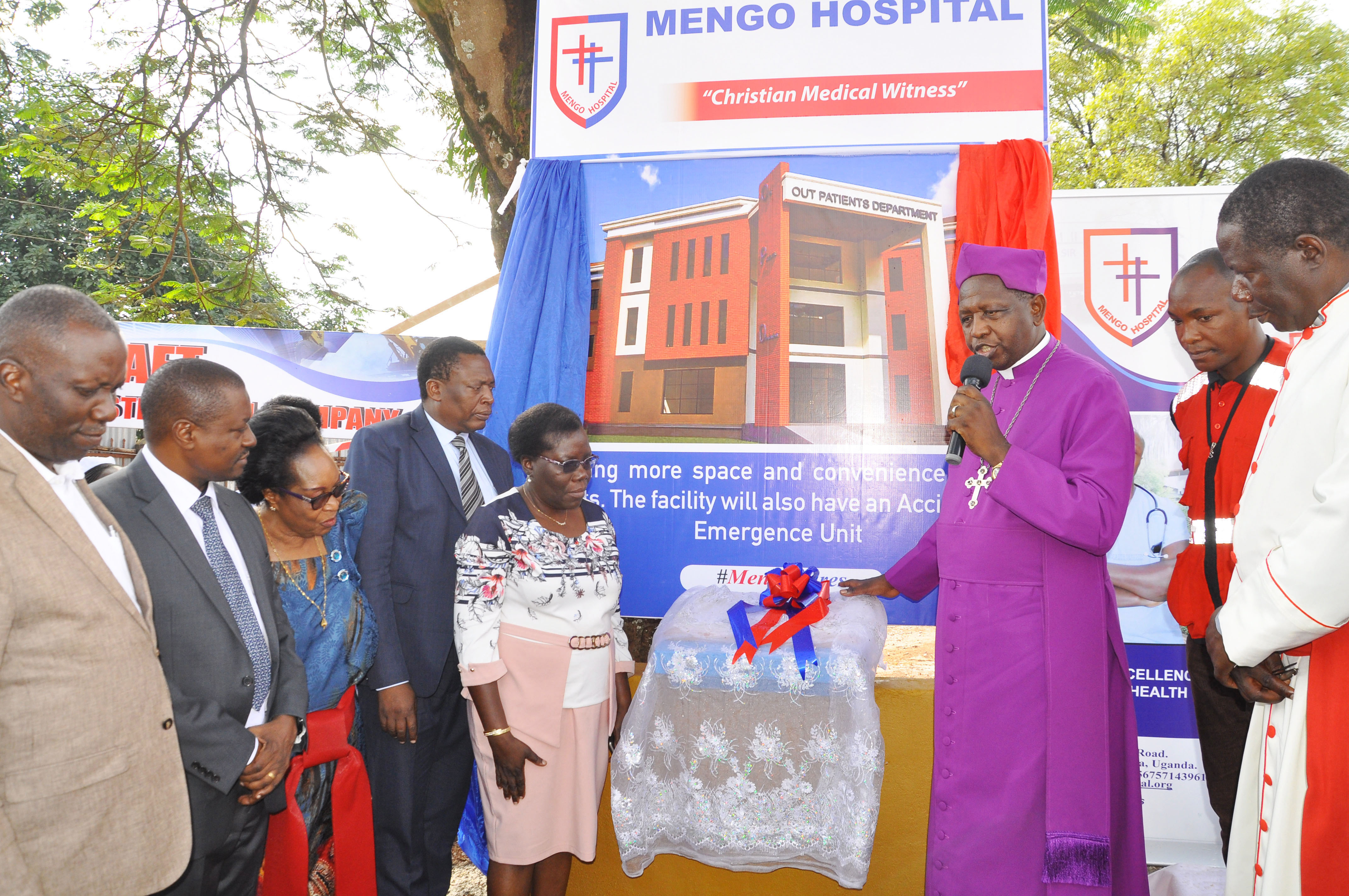
Mengo hospital 2.jpg

== Overview ==
Mengo Hospital is the oldest hospital in Uganda. It was established by Albert Ruskin Cook in 1897. In the beginning, the hospital belonged to the Church Missionary Society. During this time, the hospital saw many medical missionaries, including Algernon Smith and Leonard Sharp, who aided in medical care and its expansion. During World War I, the African Medical Corps helped staff the hospital. In 1958, the hospital was handed over by the Church Missionary Society to an independent and autonomous Board of Governors and Registered Trustees.

Today, the hospital is an urban community hospital with all the amenities of a modern hospital in sub-Saharan Africa. It houses the Ernest Cook Radiology Department, named after Ernest Cook, the nephew of Albert Cook, who brought the first X-Ray machine to East Africa in 1907 and installed it at Mengo Hospital. The X-Ray department is located within the Sr. Albert Cook Building. The Department houses the Ernest Cook Ultrasound Research and Education Institute (ECUREI). ECUREI offers ordinary and advanced diploma courses in ultrasonography and degrees in medical imaging. The institute is affiliated with Thomas Jefferson University in Philadelphia, Pennsylvania, United States. It also collaborates with Fontys University in the Netherlands in its training programs.

== Medical school ==
In March 2016, the Daily Monitor newspaper reported that Mengo Hospital was negotiating with Uganda Christian University, in Mukono to establish a medical school at the hospital. No time-frame was disclosed.

== See also ==
- Kampala Capital City Authority
- Mengo Palace
- Hospitals in Uganda
- Church of Uganda
