= Albert Ruskin Cook =

19/20th-century British physician and missionary in colonial Uganda

Sir Albert Cook
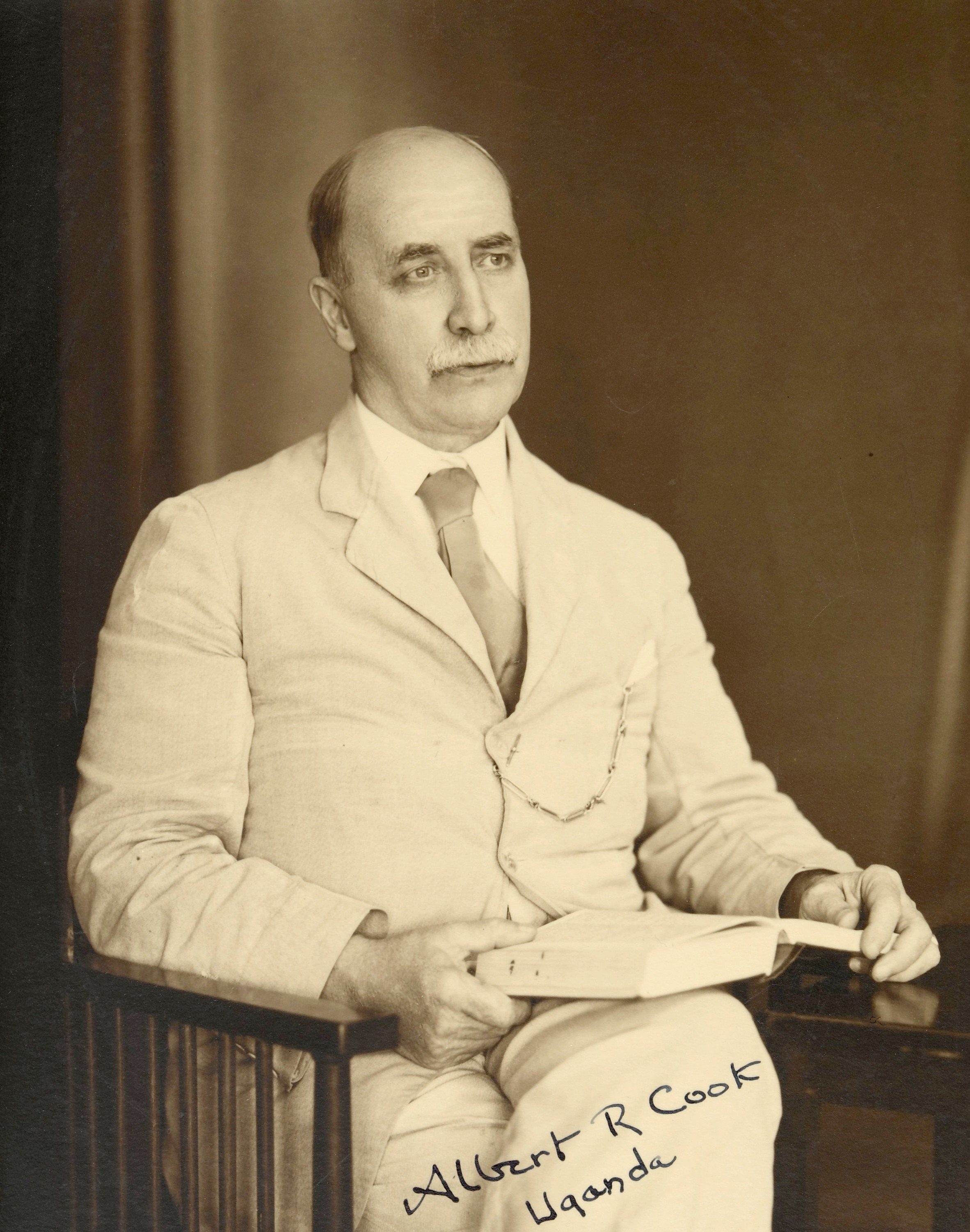
- Cook in c.1930
- Born: Albert Ruskin Cook; 22 March 1870; Hampstead, London, England
- Died: 23 April 1951 (aged 81); Kampala, Uganda
- Education: Trinity College, Cambridge (BA); St Bartholomew's Hospital (MBBS, MD)
- Occupations: Doctor and missionary
- Years active: 1896–1951
- Known for: Missionary/humanitarian work
- Spouse: Katharine Cook
- Medical career
- Institutions: Mulago Hospital; Mengo Hospital
- Awards: Order of the British Empire; Order of St Michael and St George

Sir Albert Ruskin Cook, CMG, OBE (22 March 1870 – 23 April 1951) was a British medical missionary in Uganda, and the founder of Mulago Hospital and Mengo Hospital. Together with his wife, Katharine Cook (1863–1938). He established a maternity training school in Uganda.

== Medical and missionary career ==
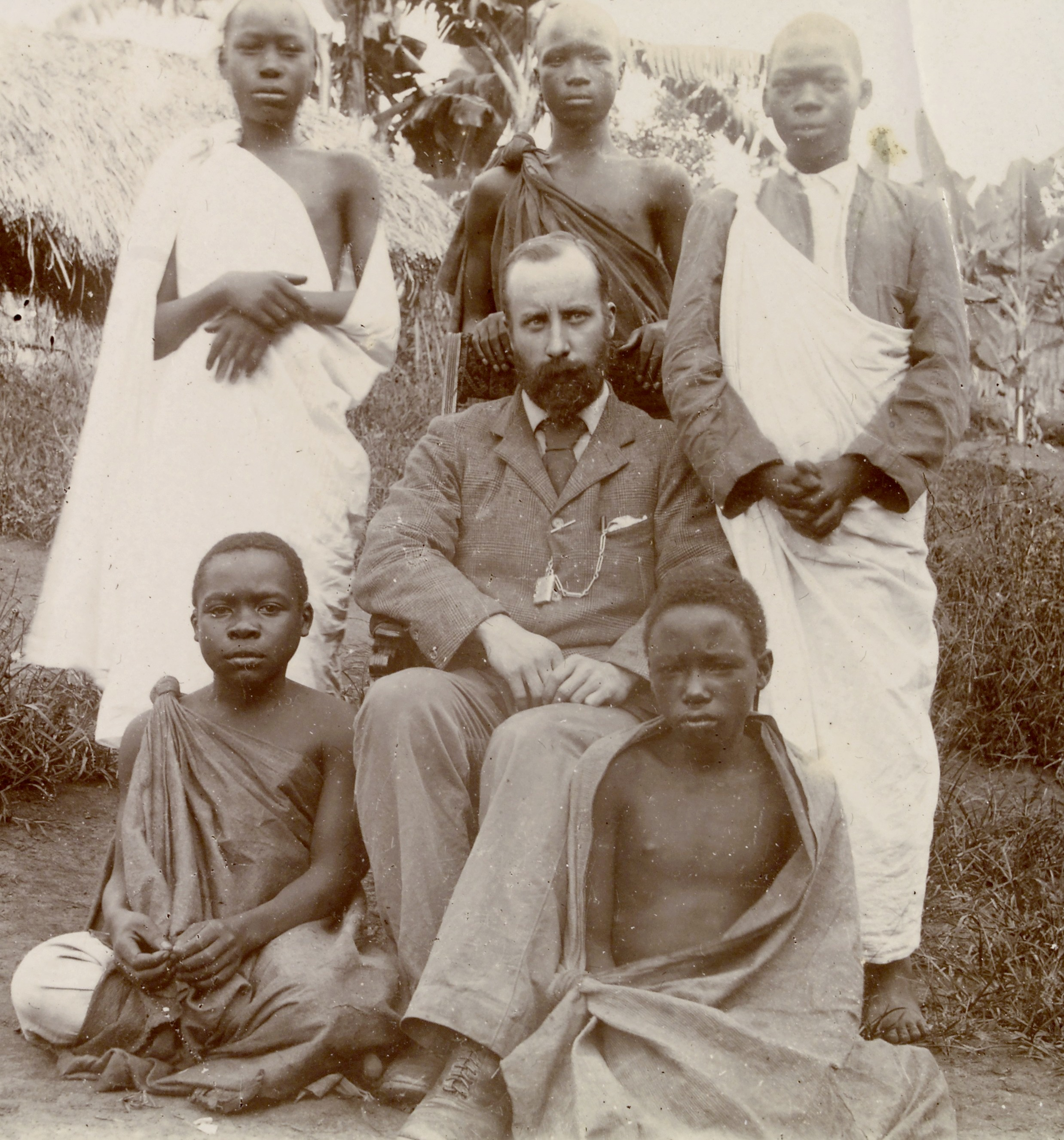
Albert Ruskin Cook in Uganda, 1897

Albert Ruskin Cook was born in Hampstead, London in 1870. His parents were Dr. W.H. Cook and Harriet Bickersteth Cook. He graduated from Trinity College, Cambridge in 1893 with a bachelor's degree, and from St Bartholomew's Hospital in 1895 as a bachelor of medicine. He became a doctor of medicine in 1901.

In 1896, Albert Cook went to Uganda with a Church Missionary Society mission, and in 1897 he established Mengo Hospital, the oldest hospital in East Africa. In 1899 he was joined by his older brother John Howard Cook, a surgeon and ophthalmologist. Albert Cook married Katharine Timpson, a missionary nurse, in 1900, with whom he had two daughters and a son.

Sir Albert Cook was unusual among medical missionaries because of his efforts to train Africans to become skilled medical workers. He and his wife opened a school for midwives at Mengo and authored a manual of midwifery in Ganda, the local language (Amagezi Agokuzalisa; published by Sheldon Press, London). Albert Cook started training African medical assistants at Mulago during the First World War, and in the 1920s, encouraged the opening of a medical College that initially trained Africans to the level defined by the colonial government as "Asian sub-assistant surgeon". The school grew to become a fully fledged medical school in his lifetime.

Cook established a treatment centre for the venereal diseases and sleeping sickness in 1913, which later became Mulago Hospital. He was president of the Uganda Branch of the British Medical Association (BMA) between 1914 and 1918, during which time he founded a school for African medical assistants.

He was president of The Uganda Society in 1933-1934 preceded by Justice F. G. Smith and succeeded by Edward James Wayland.

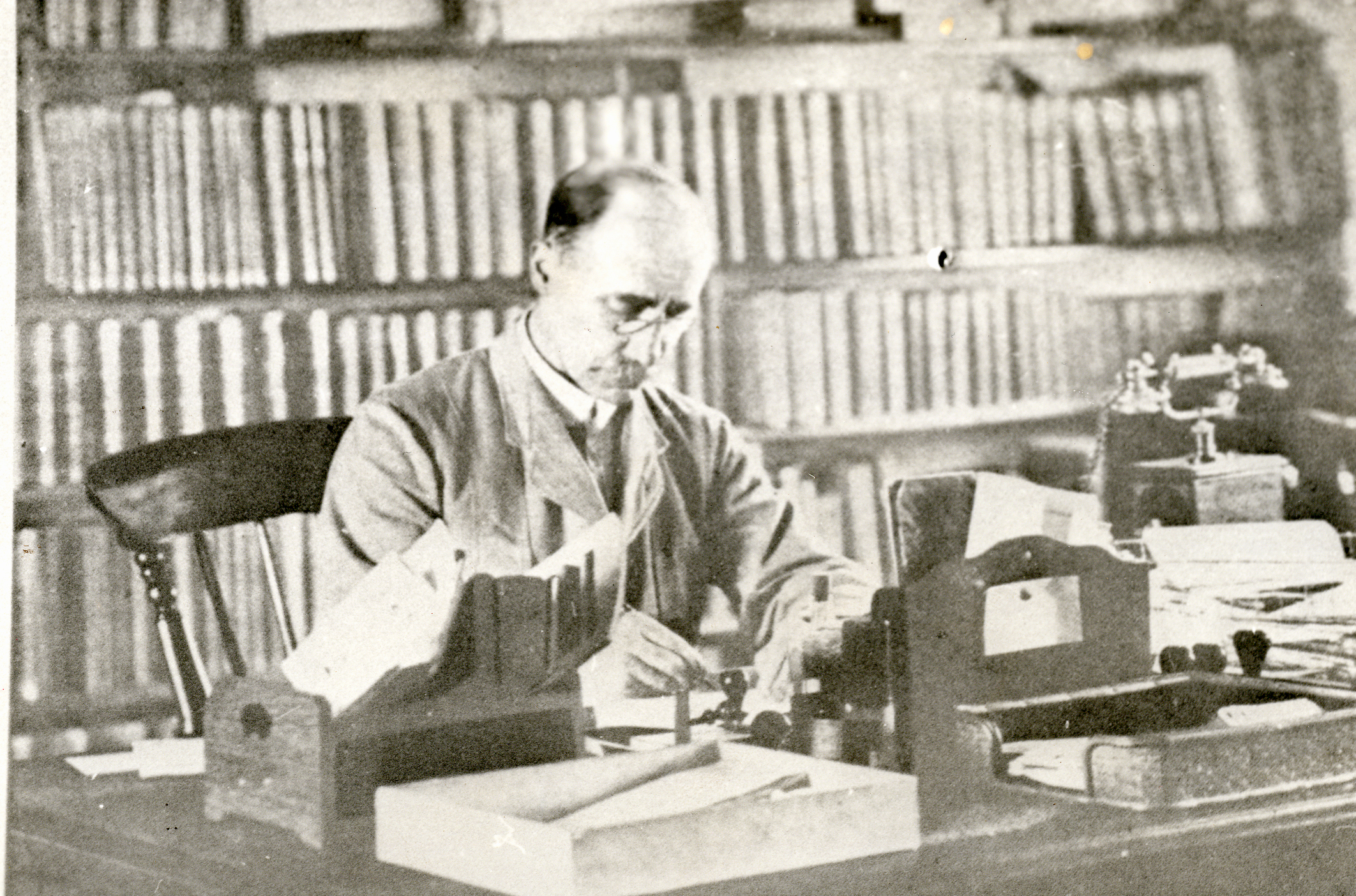
Sir Albert cook in Mengo Hospital.jpg

== Honours ==
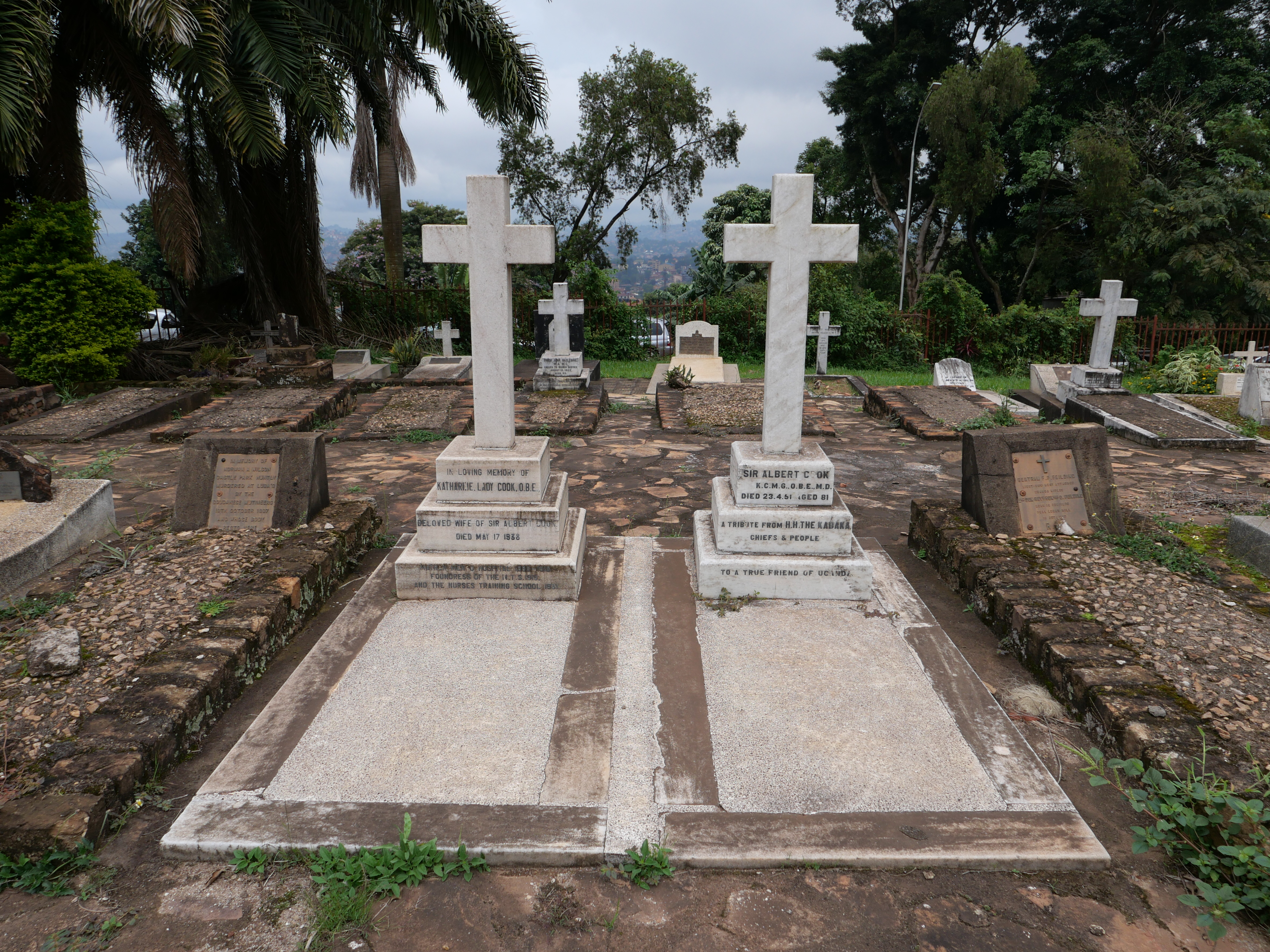
Cook's grave, center right, next to the one of his wife in 2024.

Cook was awarded the Order of the British Empire in 1918, the Companion of the Order of St Michael and St George in 1922, and received a knighthood in 1932. In 1936–37, he was again president of BMA (Uganda Branch).

Sir Albert Cook died on 23 April 1951 in Kampala, thirteen years after his wife. He found his final resting place next to her grave at the cemetery of St. Paul's Cathedral Namirembe. His tombstone bears the inscription:

"A TRIBUTE FROM H.H. THE KABAKA; CHIEFS & PEOPLE TO A TRUE FRIEND OF UGANDA"
