= Nazigo =

- Map of Uganda showing the location of Nazigo.
- Coordinates: 00°38′31″N 32°59′24″E
- Country: Uganda
- Region: Central Region of Uganda
- District: Kayunga District
- County: Ntenjeru County
- Sub-county: Nazigo Sub-county
- Elevation: 1,100 m (3,600 ft)
- Time zone: UTC+3 (EAT)

Nazigo is a town in Kayunga District in the Central Region of Uganda.

== Location ==
The town is on the main road between Kayunga in Kayunga District and Njeru in Buikwe District. Nazigo is approximately 12 kilometres (7.5 mi), by road, south of Kayunga, the site of the district headquarters, and approximately 36 kilometres (22 mi), by road, north of Njeru. The coordinates of Nazigo are 0°38'31.0"N, 32°59'24.0"E (Latitude:0.6419; Longitude:32.9900).

== Overview ==
Nazigo is the site of the headquarters of Nazigo Sub-county, one of the four sub-counties in Ntenjeru County, a constituent of Kayunga District.

The town is also the home of the Nazigo Teacher Training College, administered by the Church of Uganda. Negotiations are underway, between the church and Muteesa I Royal University for the university to take over the college and transform it into its Faculty of Education, thus creating a campus in Nazigo.

== Points of interest ==
The following additional points of interest lie within the town or close to its borders:

- offices of Nazigo Town Council
- Nazigo central market
- Nazigo police station
- Nazigo Health Centre III, a health unit administered by the Uganda Ministry of Health

== See also ==
- Ntenjeru
- Bbaale
