= Lawrence Mbwega =

Ugandan Roman Catholic priest (1912 - 2010)

Monsignor Lawrence Mbwega
- Priest of Kampala Archdiocese
- Church: Catholic Church
- Archdiocese: Roman Catholic Archdiocese of Kampala
- See: Roman Catholic Archdiocese of Kampala
- Appointed: 10 December 1939
- Term ended: 10 January 2010

Orders
- Ordination: 10 December 1939
- Rank: Priest

Personal details
- Born: Lawrence Mbwega; 5 November 1912 Lubongo Village, Nkokonjeru, Buikwe District, Uganda
- Died: 6 January 2010 (aged 97) Nsambya Hospital, Makindye Division, Kampala

Lawrence Mbwega (5 November 1912 - 6 January 2010) was a Ugandan Roman Catholic priest who was reported to be the country's longest-serving priest. At the time of his death aged 97 years and 2 months, he was still active as the caretaker priest of Queen Mother of Peace Kiwamirembe Shrine, a retirement home for Catholic priests in Lweeza in the Roman Catholic Diocese of Kampala in Uganda.

He was ordained priest on 10 December 1939 and died on 6 January 2010, having served as priest for over 70 years. He spent a considerable period of time at Namugongo Parish as the parish priest. He is credited with having designed and supervised the construction of the lake with an outside altar adjacent to the Basilica of the Uganda Martyrs, Namugongo. He was the parish priest in the late 1960s and 1970s when the old church building was erased to make room for the current cathedral structure.

== Background and education ==
He was born on 5 November 1912 in Lubongo Village, Nkokonjeru, Buikwe District, in southeast Uganda. His parents, Matayo Nandibijjo Lulume and Alistera Mbakolere hailed from the Buvuma Islands in Lake Victoria, but had relocated to the mainland during the sleeping sickness epidemic at the beginning of the 20th century.

He was baptized in the Catholic faith on 5 December 1912. In December 1925, he volunteered to his parish priest that he wanted to study to become a priest. After getting the consent of his parents, Mbwega joined Nyenga Seminary for the next six years. In 1931 he transferred to Ggaba Major Seminary, studying there for the next eight years. He was ordained priest on 10 December 1939.

== Priesthood ==
While a priest he served in various roles including as outlined below:

On 2 February 1940, he was posted to Bududa near Mbale in the Bugisu sub-region. He was rotated from there to Budadiri, in Sironko District, then back to Bududa, Nyenga, in Buikwe District and back east to Kwapa, Tororo County, Tororo District, Eastern Region, Uganda. After serving in Pallisa, Nyondo (near Mbale) and Kwapa a second time, his service in the Eastern Region of Uganda came to an end in 1948.

He was then transferred to the Buganda Region of Uganda, starting at Namagunga Catholic Parish, then to Namilyango Catholic Parish. He then worked at Namugongo Catholic Parish, where he spent 25 years as the parish priest. While there, he is credited with the design and construction of the artificial lake outside the Uganda's Minor Basilica located there. He also co-founded Uganda Martyrs' Secondary School Namugongo, a mixed boarding middle and high school.

After Namugongo, he worked in Malongwe, Buikwe, Buikwe District, Central Region, Uganda and finally Kiwamirembe, Lweeza, Wakiso District.

== Illness and death ==
On Christmas day 2009, Father Mbwega celebrated Mass at Kiwamirembe. Afterwards he felt unwell. He was admitted to St. Francis Hospital Nsambya, in Kampala, the county's capital city. He died there on the morning of Wednesday, 6 January 2010, at the age of 97 years and two months. He was the longest-serving priest in Uganda at that time. He was buried at Kiwamirembe on Monday, 10 January 2010.

== See also ==
- Catholic Church in Uganda
- Christopher Kakooza
- John Baptist Kakubi
