= Ntenjeru =

- Map of Uganda showing the location of Ntenjeru.
- Coordinates: 00°44′42″N 32°53′24″E
- District: Kayunga District
- Elevation: 1,070 m (3,510 ft)
- Time zone: UTC+3 (EAT)

Ntenjeru is a town in Kayunga District in Uganda. It is the location of the headquarters of Ntenjeru County.

== Location ==
Ntenjeru is located in Kayunga District, approximately 7 kilometres (4.3 mi), by road, north of Kayunga, the largest town in the district and the location of the district headquarters. This location lies of the main road that runs from Kayunga, in the south of the district to Galiraya, in the extreme north of the district, a distance of approximately 82 kilometres (51 mi). The coordinates of Ntenjeru are:00 44 42N, 32 53 24E (Latitude:0.7450; Longitude:32.8900).

== Overview ==
Ntenjeru is a small town in Kayunga District. It is the location of the headquarters of Ntenjeru County, one of the counties that constitute the district; the other county being Bbaale County.

== Population ==
As of January 2010, the exact population of Ntenjeru is not known.

== Landmarks ==
The landmarks within Ntenjeru or near its borders include:

- The headquarters of Ntenjeru County - Ntenjeru County is one of the two counties that constitute Kayunga District
- Ntenjeru Central Market - The largest fresh produce market in town
- The town of Kayunga (pop. 23,600 in 2011), where the headquarters of Kayunga District are located, is situated 7 kilometres (4.3 mi), by road, south of Ntenjeru

== See also ==
- Ntenjeru County
- Bbaale
- Bbaale County
- Kayunga
- Nazigo
- Kayunga District
