= Lwajjali River =

River in Uganda

Lwajjali
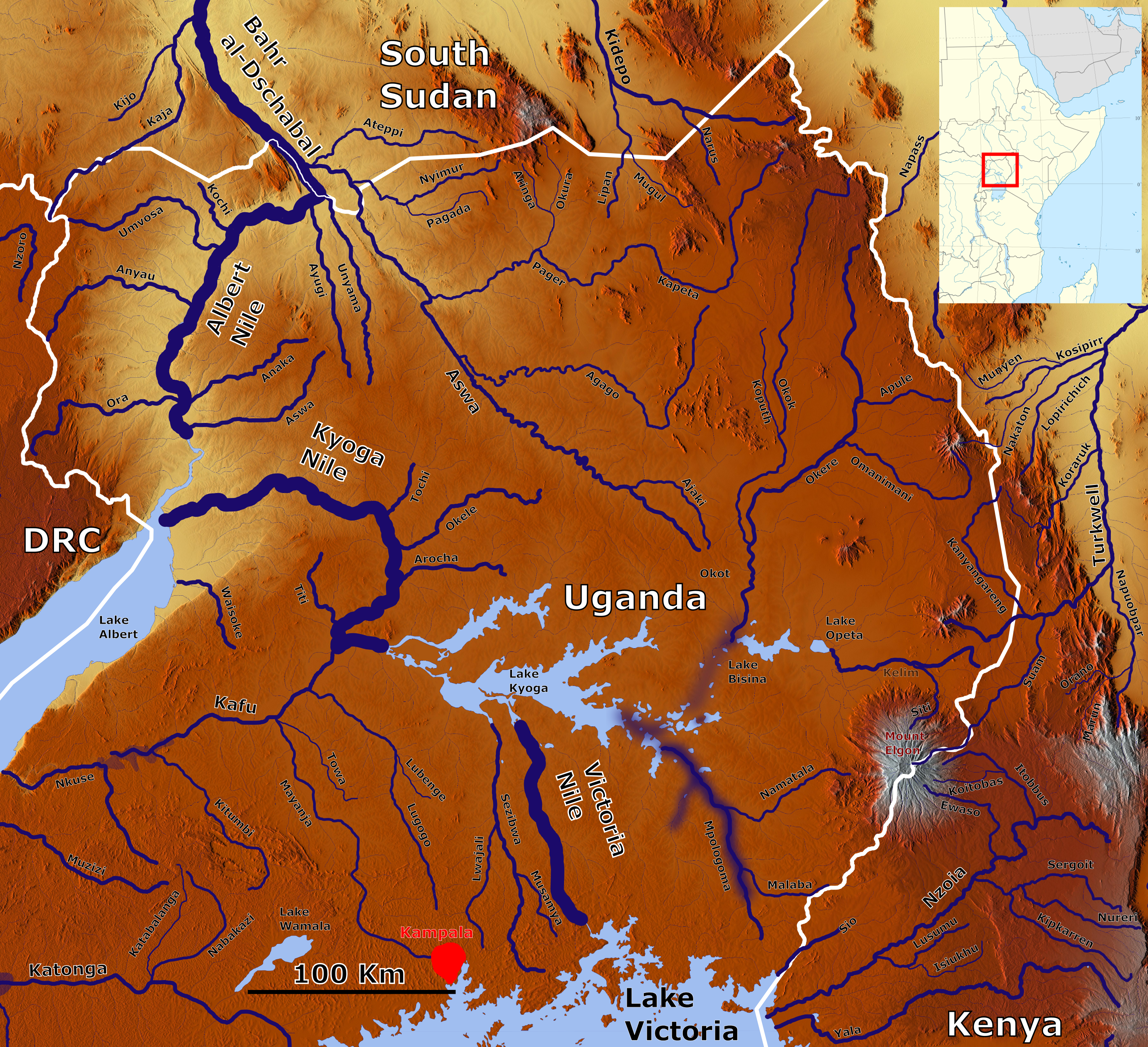
- The rivers of northern Uganda with the Lwajjali River (bottom center)

Location
- Country: Uganda

Physical characteristics
- Source: Kisweera Swamp, Mukono District
  - location: Kisweera, Central Region, Uganda
  - coordinates: 00°24′50″N 32°45′03″E
  - elevation: 1,200 m (3,900 ft)
- Mouth: Sezibwa River, Kayunga District
  - location: Kiziba Swamp, Central Region, Uganda
  - coordinates: 00°51′27″N 32°47′28.50″E
  - elevation: 1,150 m (3,770 ft)
- Length: 65 km (40 mi)

River Lwajjali is a river in Uganda, in East Africa.

== Location ==
The Lwajjali River is located in Central Uganda. It starts from the swamp, west of the village of Kisweera, in Mukono District, the Central Region of Uganda. It flows in a northwestern direction at first, then turns north and then northeast to empty into River Sezibwa in Kayunga District at its border with Luweero District, east of the village of Kiziba. The source of River Lwajjali is located in Kisweera, with coordinates:0°24'50.0"N, 32°45'03.0"E (Latitude:0.413889; Longitude:32.750833). River Lwajjali empties into River Sezibwa in the swamps north of Kayunga, in Kayunga District, with coordinates:0°51'27.0"N, 32°47'29.0"E (Latitude:0.857500; Longitude:32.791389).

== Course ==
Out of its source, the river flows northwest and crosses the Gayaza-Kayunga Road at Nakasajja, where it forms the border between Wakiso District to the west and Mukono District to the east. The river then makes a gradual turn to flow in a northward direction. It continues to curve clockwise, now forming the boundary between Kayunga District to the east and Luweero District to the west. In the swamps north of Kayunga, approximately 25 kilometres (16 mi), north of the town, Lwajjali empties into Sezibwa River, which continues northwards to empty into Lake Kyoga.

At its source, the altitude is approximately 1,200 metres (3,900 ft). At its point of entry into River Sezibwa, the altitude is approximately 1,150 metres (3,770 ft). The length of River Lwajjali, is approximately 65 kilometres (40 mi) from source to end.

== See also ==
- Sezibwa River
- Wakiso District
- Mukono District
- Kayunga District
- Luweero District
