= Galilaya =

- Nickname: Galiraya
- Map of Uganda showing the location of Galilaya.
- Coordinates: 01°22′12″N 32°48′54″E
- Country: Uganda
- Region: Central
- District: Kayunga
- County: Bbaale
- Sub-county: Galilaya
- Elevation: 1,040 m (3,410 ft)
- Time zone: UTC+3 (EAT)

Galilaya is a town in Kayunga District of the Central Region of Uganda. The town is also known by its correct phonetic spelling, as Galiraya.

== Location ==
Galilaya is in the extreme northern Kayunga District, at the northern end of the Kayunga-Galilaya Road. This is approximately 83 kilometres (52 mi) north of Kayunga, where the district headquarters are located. The travel distance between Galilaya and Kampala, the capital of Uganda, is approximately 145 kilometres (90 mi) by road. The coordinates of Galiraya are: 1°22'12.0"N, 32°48'54.0"E (Latitude: 1.3700; Longitude: 32.8150).

== Overview ==
Galilaya is the location of the headquarters of the Galilaya sub-county, one of the four sub-counties in Bbaale County, a constituent of Kayunga District. The town is one of the northernmost urban centers in the Central Region. Galilaya is close to the point where the Victoria Nile enters Lake Kyoga, to the east of town. Not far from the town center, to the west of town, the River Sezibwa also enters Lake Kyoga after its 150 kilometres (93 mi) northward journey.

== Points of interest ==
The following points of interest lie within or close to the town:

- Offices of Galilaya Town Council
- Galilaya central market
- Galilaya police station
- Galilaya Health Centre, administered by the Uganda Ministry of Health
- The northern end of the Kayunga–Galiraya Road is located in town.

== See also ==
- Ntenjeru
- Bbaale
