= Daudi Jjingo =

Daudi Jjingo is a Ugandan Bioinformatician and a lecturer working in the department of Computer Science at Makerere University. He serves as the Director at African Center of Excellence in Bioinformatics and Data Intensive Science. His main area of focus is on computational platforms that include hardware, software and research for data intensive research including Artificial Intelligence. Dr. Daudi also serves as Program Director/PI for the Ugandan NIH H3Africa Bioinformatics Training Program as a Bioinformatics scientist who worked a Bioinformatics Consultant at the Centre for Disease Control Headquarters in Atlanta before returning to Uganda.

== Career ==
Dr. Daudi studied from Makerere University where he pursued a Bachelor of Science in Biochemistry. he then moved to study his Masters of Science in Bioinformatics and Computational Biology from the University of Leeds in United Kingdom. He earned a PhD as a FullBright Scholar at the Georgian Institute of Technology in Atlanta, United States of America where he qualified for a PhD in Bioinformatics. He has authored and published research findings on Malaria and HIV on research platforms like Research gate. Dr. Daudi is a member of the Artificial Intelligence Laboratory at Makerere University in Uganda, and is expected to lead the registry component of the Ugandan Sickle African Pan African Network program. His work covers other medical disciplines like the molecular epidemiology of Tuberculosis and HIV with regard to the application of data science to biomedical research.

Dr. Daudi co-leads the She Data Science Program at UC San Francisco Institute for Global Health Sciences to support women in data science through graduate training and mentorship.

== See also ==
- Diana Atwine
- Health in Uganda
- Jane Aceng
- Jane Fualal Odubu
