= Kayunga Hospital =

- Uganda Ministry of Health

Geography
- Location: Kayunga, Kayunga District, Buganda Region, Uganda
- Coordinates: 00°42′12″N 32°54′14″E

Organisation
- Care system: Public
- Type: General

Services
- Emergency department: I
- Beds: 100

History
- Founded: 1973; 53 years ago

Links
- Other links: Hospitals in Uganda

Kayunga Hospital is a public hospital in Uganda.

== Location ==
The hospital is located in the town of Kayunga in Kayunga District in the Buganda Region of Uganda, approximately 51 kilometres (32 mi) north-east of Mukono, the nearest large city. This is about 67.5 kilometres (42 mi) north-east of Mulago National Referral Hospital, the nation's largest referral hospital in Kampala. The coordinates of Kayunga Hospital are 0°42'12.0"N, 32°54'14.0"E (Latitude:0.703329; Longitude:32.903886).

== Overview ==
Kayunga Hospital opened in 1973 during the reign of Idi Amin. It offers services to residents from Kayunga district and neighboring districts including Kamuli, Buikwe, Mukono, Luweero and Nakasongola.

According to a 2009 news report, Kayunga Hospital had a dilapidated and crumbling infrastructure, aging equipment and machinery, under-staffing, poor staff remuneration, overwhelming patient numbers, and under-funding.

== Renovations and improvements ==
In 2016, the Government of Uganda secured loans from Middle Eastern lenders totaling USh70 billion (approx. US$19 million), to renovate the dilapidated hospital and equipment, as well as construct new staff housing. The renovations were funded by loans from the (a) Saudi Fund for Development, (b) Arab Bank for Economic Development in Africa (BADEA) and (c) OPEC Fund for International Development (OFID).

After delays blamed on "bureaucracy within the Ministry of Health", the actual work started in early 2018.

The scope of the renovations included (1) a new Emergency Department (Casualty) (2) new operating rooms (theatres) (3) new out-patient department (4) new administration office block (5) expansion of the in-patient wards (6) new staff housing (7) rehabilitation of the water supply system (8) rehabilitation of the sewerage collection and disposal system.

The expansion and renovations are expected to conclude in 2020, with a total bed capacity of 300, and the conversion of Kayunga Hospital, to Kayunga Regional Referral Hospital. The main contractor is Arab Contractors Uganda Limited.

== Regional Referral Hospital status ==
After renovations and expansion, then now 200-bed facility was upgraded to a Regional Referral Hospital, responsible for the districts of Buikwe, Jinja, Kayunga, Kamuli, Luweero, Mukono and Nakasongola.

== See also ==
- Hospitals in Uganda
