= Ngogwe =

- Map of Uganda showing the location of Ngogwe.
- Coordinates: 00°14′34″N 32°59′26″E
- Country: Uganda
- Regions of Uganda: Central Region of Uganda
- District: Buikwe District
- County: Buikwe County
- Constituency: Buikwe South

Government
  - Member of Parliament: Lulume Bayigga
- Elevation: 1,200 m (3,900 ft)
- Time zone: UTC+3 (EAT)

Ngogwe is a municipality in Buikwe District in the Central Region of Uganda.

== Location ==
Ngogwe is approximately 18.5 kilometres (11.5 mi) south of Buikwe, the site of the district headquarters and about 55 kilometres (34 mi) southeast of Kampala, the capital and largest city of Uganda. The coordinates of Ngogwe are 0°14'34.0"N, 32°59'26.0"E (Latitude:0.242778; Longitude:32.990556).

== Points of interest ==
The following points of interest lie in or near Ngogwe:

- offices of Ngogwe Town Council
- Ngogwe Baskerville Secondary School
- Ngogwe central market
- source of River Sezibwa, located just north of the town
- Mukono–Kyetume–Katosi–Nyenga Road passing through the middle of the town

== See also ==
- List of cities and towns in Uganda
- List of roads in Uganda
