= Stephen Sserubula =

Ugandan politician

Honourable Stephen Sserubula
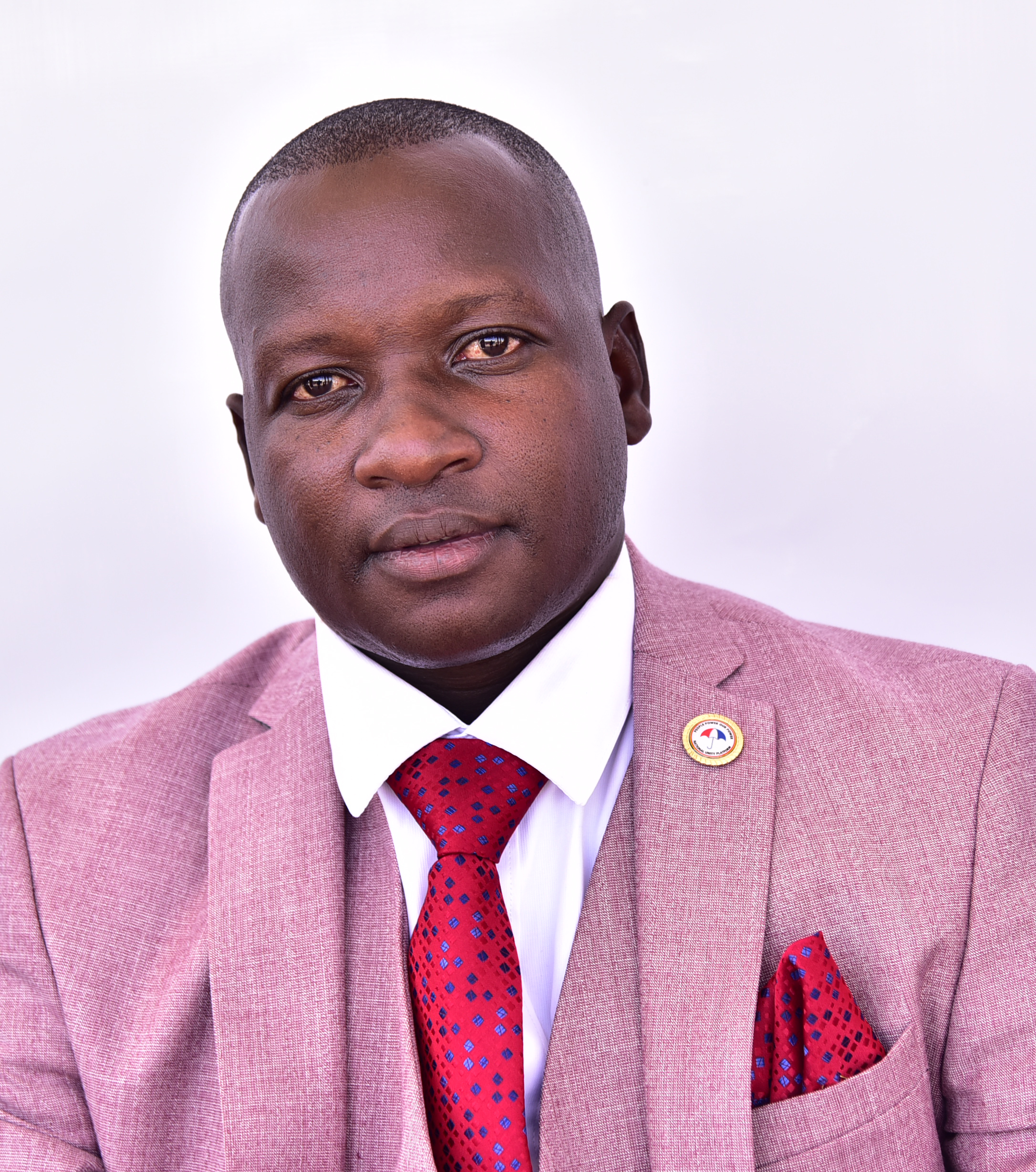
- Stephen Sserubula

Member of the Parliament of Uganda
- Incumbent
- Assumed office 24 May 2021
- Preceded by: Isaac Mulindwa
- Constituency: Lugazi Municipality, Buikwe District

Personal details
- Born: February 9, 1981 (age 45)
- Party: Democratic Party (2016), National Unity Platform (2021)

Stephen Sserubula (born 9 February 1981) is a Ugandan politician who served as an MP of Uganda.

== Electoral history ==
Sserubula ran for parliament as a member of the Democratic Party in the 2016 Ugandan general election, but lost to Isaac Mulindwa. He beat Mulindwa in the 2021 Ugandan general election, and is a member of the 11th parliament as a National Unity Platform member.He lost the Lugazi municipality parliamentary seat in the 2026 Ugandan general elections to Senteza Richard who contested as an independent candidate.

== Career ==
Before entering politics, Sserubula worked as a teacher. Sserubula has criticized the Parish Development Model, a new development plan that allocates funds to local communities (parishes), arguing that it is susceptible to corruption. He has also criticized negative environmental impacts of factories in his district, saying: “Much as they give our people jobs, the factories must be mindful of the health of our people”.
