= Sulaiman Madada =

Ugandan politician

- Born: 11 November 1961 (age 64); Kayunga, Uganda
- Citizenship: Uganda
- Education: Kampala International University (BA), (MA)
- Occupations: Journalist & Politician
- Years active: 1986–present
- Known for: Civil Service
- Title: State Minister for the Elderly & Disabled

Sulaiman Kyebakoze Madada is a Ugandan journalist and politician. He is the State Minister for the Elderly and the Disabled in the Ugandan Cabinet. He was appointed to that position on 1 June 2006. In the cabinet reshuffle of 16 February 2009, and that of 27 May 2011, he retained his cabinet post. He is also the elected Member of Parliament, representing Bbaale County, Kayunga District. He has represented that constituency continuously since 2001.

== Background and education ==
He was born in Kayunga District on 11 November 1961. Sulaiman Madada holds a Bachelor of Arts in Mass Communication degree, obtained in 2009, from Kampala International University (KIU). His degree of Master of Arts in Development Administration & Management was awarded in 2011, also by KIU.

== Work experience ==
From 1986 until 1992, he worked as a Broadcast Executive at a radio station. Sometime between 1992 and 2001, he joined politics and was elected to represent Bbaale County, Kayunga District, in the parliamentary elections of 2001, serving in that capacity until 2006. In 2006, he was re-elected to Parliament unopposed. On 1 June 2006, he was appointed State Minister for Disabilities. He maintains that post as of February 2015.

== Personal information ==
He is married. He belongs to the National Resistance Movement political party. He is reported to have a special interest in volunteering, and the arts.

== See also ==
- Parliament of Uganda
- Cabinet of Uganda
- Kayunga District
