= Kayunga–Galiraya Road =

Road in Uganda

Coordinates: 00°50′49″N 32°52′44″E

Route information
- Length: 54 mi (87 km)
- History: Designation in 2025; Expected completion in 2028

Major junctions
- South end: Kayunga
- Bbaale
- North end: Galiraya

Location
- Country: Uganda

Highway system
- Roads in Uganda

Kayunga–Galiraya Road is a road in the Central Region of Uganda connecting the town of Kayunga to the towns of Bbaale and Galilaya (Galiraya) on the shores of Lake Kyoga.

== Location ==
The road starts at Kayunga, continues north through Bbaale, and ends in Galiraya on the shores of Lake Kyoga, a distance of approximately 85 kilometres (53 mi). The road connects the southern part of Kayunga District to its northern part and is the main road in the area. It runs in a south to north direction, with River Sezibwa to its west and the Victoria Nile to the road's east.

== Upgrading to bitumen ==
The government of Uganda has earmarked this road for upgrading from gravel to bitumen surface and the building of bridges and drainage channels. In July 2009, the government received funding from the African Development Bank, to engage consulting engineering firms to conduct detailed feasibility studies. The following consulting engineering firms have been shortlisted:

- Aurecon of South Africa
- JBG Gauff Ingeniure of Germany
- TECNIC Consulting Engineers of Spain
- Aarvee Associates of India
- Coda & Partners

M As of November 2014, project preparation was ongoing. The engineering, procurement and construction (EPC) contract was awarded to China Road and Bridge Corporation (CRBC). CRBC will fund the construction upfront and will grant a grace period of two years from commencing of works. The owner's engineer is the Uganda's Ministry of Works and Transport.

In December 2025, the Parliament of Uganda approved a package of UShs313.2 billion (approximately US$87.6 million) to fund the tarmacking and widening of this to class II bitumen standard, with construction of drainage channels and insertion of culverts.

== See also ==
- Kayunga District
- Ugandan Towns
- Economy of Uganda
- Uganda National Roads Authority
- List of roads in Uganda
