= Ntenjeru County =

County in Kayunga District in Uganda

Coordinates: 00°40′N 32°57′E

Ntenjeru County is a county in the Kayunga District in Uganda. It occupies the southern half of the district. It contains four sub-counties and one municipality:

== Location ==
Ntenjeru County is located in Kayunga District, Central Uganda, bordering Kayunga County. The county is predominantly rural, with agriculture as the main economic activity. Its strategic location supports local trade and connects communities within the district.

== Population ==
According to the Uganda Bureau of Statistics (2014 National Census), Ntenjeru County had a total population of about 125,331 people.

== Sub-Counties ==
- Kayunga Sub-county
- Busaana Sub-county
- Nazigo Sub-county
- Kangulumira Sub-county
- Kayunga Municipality

== See also ==
- Bbaale County
- Bbaale
- Ntenjeru
- Nazigo
