= RASD =

RASD may refer to:

- RasD, a protein
- Sahrawi Arab Democratic Republic (Spanish: República Árabe Saharaui Democrática), a partially recognized state of Western Sahara
- Rural Agency for Sustainable Development, an NGO located in the Mukono District of Uganda
- Ridgway Area School District A rural school district in Northwestern Pennsylvania along the Allegany National Forest and the Clarion River.
