= Richard Sebamala =

Ugandan politician

Richard Sebamala Honorable
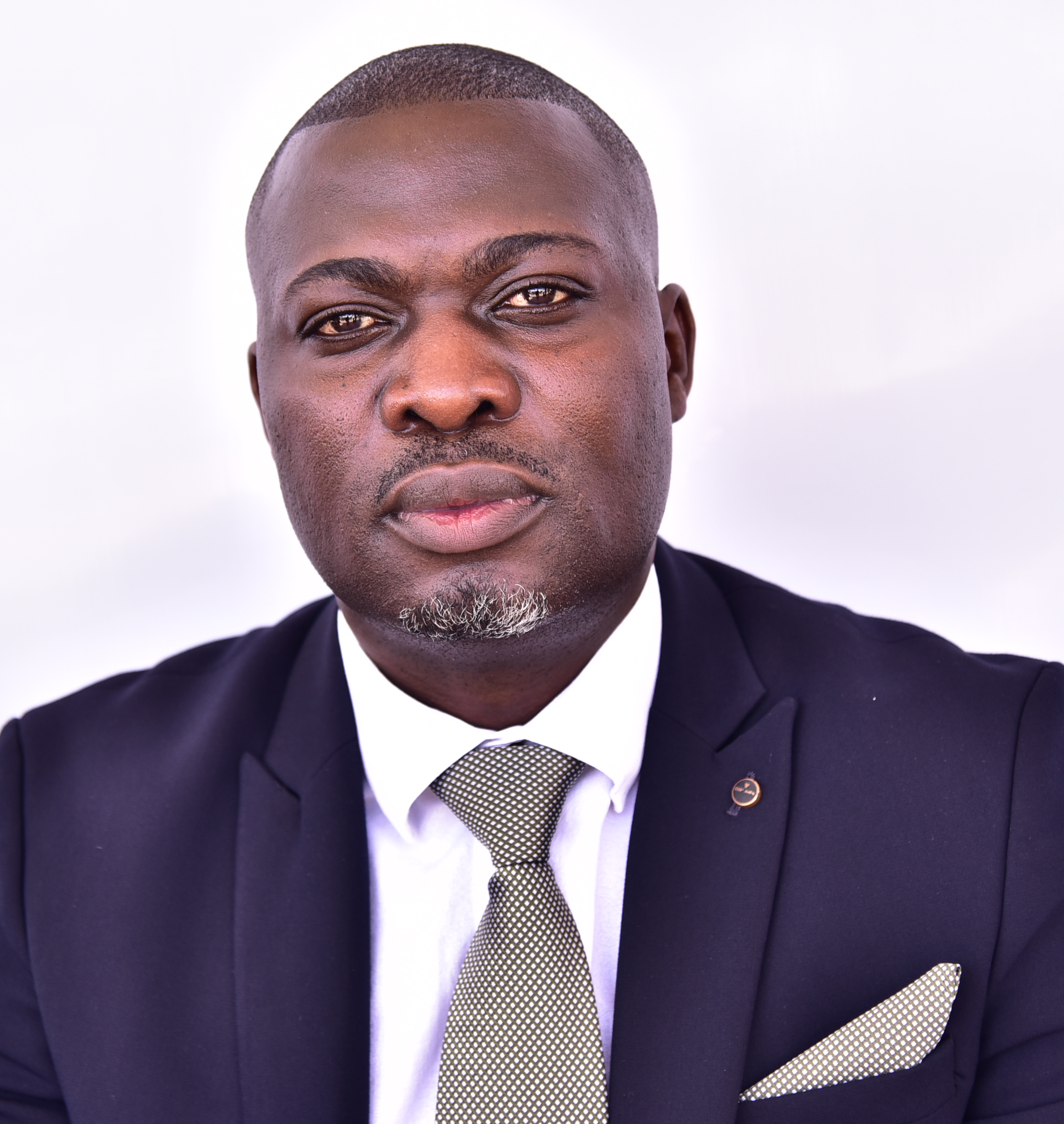
- Richard Sebamala

Member of Parliament for Bukoto Central Constituency Masaka District
- Incumbent
- Assumed office May 20, 2021

Personal details
- Born: 22 January 1979 (age 47) Masaka District
- Party: Democratic Party
- Spouse: Mbabazi Joanitah Sebamala (since 2011)
- Education: Kyambogo University (Bachelor's degree in Engineering); Uganda Management Institute (Bachelor's Degree of Engineering in Civil and Building)
- Occupation: Civil engingeer, politician, public administrator
- Known for: Engineering, Politics, Public Administration, leadership
- Website: https://sebamala.com/

Richard Sebamala (born 22 January 1979) is a Ugandan civil engineer, businessman and politician who is a Member of Parliament representing Bukoto Central constituency in the 11th Ugandan Parliament (2021 to date in 2026). He was first elected in this seat on 14 January 2021 during the 2021 Uganda general elections.

He is a member of the Democratic Party of Uganda. In the Parliament of Uganda he serves as a member on the Committee of Infrastructure which supervises both the Ministry of Land & Housing and also Ministry of Works and Transport as well as he is a member of the Public Account Committee for COSASE.

== Early life and education ==
Sebamala was born on 22 January 1979 in Bisanje in Buddu County, Masaka Distri to thct in the central region of Uganda to Mr. Cyrus Ndawula an electrician and Ms Betty Elizabeth Nannyonga a midwife. He finished his primary education at Nazareth Boarding Primary School, Bukalasa Seminary for Ordinary level and sat for his UACE at Namilyango College in 2000. In 2001, he joined Kyambogo University and he graduated in 2005 with a Bachelor's Degree of Engineering in Civil and Building. He also holds a Master's in Leadership and management from the Uganda Management Institute.

== Career ==
Before his graduation from Kyambogo University in 2004, Sebamala served as an internee at Zzimwe Construction Company, a Ugandan road construction firm. He has served in various position of engineering in different companies such as a Director at Ddaki Technical Services (2006), as a Contract Manager at Multiplex Uganda Limited (September 2009 – February 2010), as a Director at Multix Limited (an engineering company) 2010–2013 before joining Iganga District Local Government as a principal executive engineer (2013–2019). Currently, Sebamala is engaged in an import and export business in Kampala city.

=== Political ===
On 14 January 2021 he was elected as a member of parliament representing Bukoto County Central constituency in Masaka District in the eleventh Parliament of Uganda (2021 to 2026) in the 2021 Ugandan general election and on 20 May 2021 he sworn in as the Member of Parliament.

Sebamala garnered 9916 votes hence defeating the former Vice President Edward Kiwanuka Ssekandi who had served as the Member of Ugandan Parliament for Bukoto County Central constituency since 1996. He was one of the four Democratic Party members in 2022 who distanced themselves from the signed working cooperation agreement between the ruling National Resistance Movement-NRM party and DP which resulted into the Democratic Party president Nobert Mao being appointed by President Museveni as the minister of Justice and Constitutional affairs. After that Ssebamala expressed interest to contest Mao in the Democratic Party presidential race that was coming but was disqualified on grounds of not meeting the party requirements including the stipulation of having been a party member for at least ten years before the time someone contest for that party president position. The other three include Mityana South's Richard Lumu, Buikwe South's Lulume Bayiga, and Kyotera County's MP, John Paul Mpalanyi. He contested again for the Bukoto Central Constituency parliamentary seat in greater Masaka District, in the 2026 general election and won.

== Personal life ==
Sebamala is married to Joanitah Mbabazi and the couple has five children. He is a member of the Democratic Party of Uganda.

== See also ==
- Parliament of Uganda
- Members of the eleventh Parliament of Uganda
- 2021 Uganda general elections

== External references ==
- Biography
- Richard Sebamala
