= Kayunga–Busaana–Nabuganyi Road =

Road in Uganda

Coordinates: 00°46′37″N 32°59′23″E

Route information
- Length: 13 mi (21 km)
- History: Designation in 2020; Expected completion in 2021

Major junctions
- West end: Kayunga
- Busaana
- East end: Nabuganyi

Location
- Country: Uganda

Highway system
- Roads in Uganda

Kayunga–Busaana–Nabuganyi Road in the Central Region of Uganda connects the town of Kayunga to the town of Nabuganyi, on the western bank of the Victoria Nile, adjacent to the Isimba Hydroelectric Power Station.

== Location ==
The road starts at Kayunga, the headquarters of Kayunga District. The road continues in a general north-easterly direction to Busaana and continues in the same direction to Nabuganyi, adjacent to Isimba Power Station, a distance of approximately 20.5 kilometres (13 mi).

== Overview ==
This road is intended to ease travel from Kayunga District in the Buganda Region to Kamuli District in the Eastern Region of Uganda. A bridge, also under construction, about 0.5 miles (1 km) downstream of the Isimba Dam, will connect to Mbulamuti and ultimately to Kamuli.

The bridge, known as the Isimba Bridge, also Nabuganyi–Mbulamuti Bridge measures 2.126 kilometres (1 mi). It traverses 433 metres (1,421 ft) of the western channel of the Victoria Nile, 301 metres (988 ft) on Koova Island, in the middle of the river and 457 metres (1,499 ft) across the eastern channel of the river. Additional real estate is covered on each river bank to make up the total bridge distance. Completion is expected in December 2020.

On 29 December 2020, according to the Daily Monitor, Uganda National Roads Authority, carried out load stress tests on the Isimba Bridge and found the structure suitable for public use. Commissioning is anticipated later in January 2021. The completed bridge reduces the travel distance between Kayunga and Kamuli, from 115 kilometres (71 mi) to only 27 kilometres (17 mi).

== Upgrading to bitumen ==
Prior to the construction of the Isimba Dam, the entire road from Kayunga to the Nile River was murram-surfaced in poor condition. In January 2020, work began on tarmacking this road to class 2 bitumen with shoulders, culverts and drainage channels. The construction contract was awarded to Abubaker Technical Services Limited, a Ugandan company in collaboration with Malaysian company that will manufacture, supply and supervise the probase used in stabilizing the soil on this project. The tarmacking is funded by the Ugandan government.

== Other considerations ==
Besides the tarmacking of this road and the construction of the Isimba Bridge over the Nile, two other infrastructure developments are either ongoing or in the planning stages. The first one is a water purification system to supply potable water to the towns of Kayunga and Kamuli and the communities in between, using water drawn from the River Nile. The project, funded by the government of Uganda, was ongoing, as of November 2018. In August 2020, it was reported that the African Development Bank (AfDB) had lent US$6.5 million (USh24 billion at that time) to the government of Uganda to complete construction of a potable water pipeline in Busaana Sub-county, in Kayunga District. The work includes erection of storage reservoirs in several rural locations throughout Busaana Sub-county. The EPC contract for this work has been awarded to Vambeco Limited, a Ugandan engineering and construction company.

The second related project, is the tarmacking of the 16 kilometres (10 mi) Mbulamuti-Kamuli Road. According to the New Vision newspaper, the work is to be performed by China International Water & Electric Corporation, the same company that built the Isimba Dam and is building the 2.2 kilometres (1 mi) Isimba Bridge.
