= St. Charles Lwanga Buikwe Hospital =

Private faith-based community, hospital in Uganda

- Uganda Catholic Medical Bureau

Geography
- Location: Buikwe, Buikwe District, Central Region, Uganda
- Coordinates: 00°20′21″N 33°01′56″E

Organisation
- Care system: Community Hospital
- Type: General

Services
- Emergency department: I
- Beds: 80

History
- Founded: 2007; 19 years ago

Links
- Other links: Hospitals in Uganda; Medical education in Uganda

St. Charles Lwanga Buikwe Hospital, also Czech–Slovak–Ugandan Hospital, is a community hospital in the Central Region of Uganda. It is affiliated with the Uganda Catholic Medical Bureau.

== Location ==
The hospital is located in the town of Buikwe, in Buikwe District, about 32 kilometres (20 mi) southwest of Jinja Regional Referral Hospital, in the city of Jinja. This is approximately 78.5 kilometres (49 mi) east of Mulago National Referral Hospital, in the city of Kampala, Uganda's capital. The coordinates of the hospital are 0°20'21.0"N, 33°01'56.0"E (Latitude:0.339170; Longitude:33.032229).

== Overview ==
The hospital is a joint venture between the Roman Catholic Archdiocese of Prague in the Czech Republic and the Roman Catholic Diocese of Lugazi in Uganda. The hospital opened in February 2007, following two years of construction. It has several departments including pediatrics, surgery, internal medicine, gynecology and maternity. It is majority funded by donations from the Czech Republic. The hospital also serves as the teaching hospital for the Johnass International College of Health Sciences located in the town of Njeru.

== Hospital operations ==
As of December 2019, the hospital attended to 19,491 outpatients annually on average. There were 5,579 inpatient admissions annually, on average, with a bed occupancy ratio of 80 percent. St. Charles Lwanga Buikwe Hospital averaged 804 maternal deliveries every year with a caesarean section rate of 20.7 percent. At that time, patient user fees accounted for 11.5 percent of total hospital income, on average.

== See also ==
- List of hospitals in Uganda
