= Isaac Mulindwa (politician) =

Ugandan politician

- A Uganda politician

Isaac Mulindwa
- Mulindwa in 2016

Honorable

Personal details
- Born: Isaac Ssozi Mulindwa; 26 January 1983 (age 43) Buikwe, Uganda
- Education: Makerere University (Bachelor of Social Science); Chartered Institute of Procurement & Supply (Certificate in Procurement and Supply Operations)
- Occupation: Procurement specialist, politician
- Known for: Procurement & logistics, politics

Isaac Mulindwa Ssozi (born 26 January 1983) is a Ugandan procurement specialist, logistician and politician. He was a member of parliament representing Lugazi Municipality, Buikwe District, and a representative for NRM, the ruling political party in Uganda. He is a member of the NRM Parliamentary Caucus and serves on the Committee on Equal Opportunities and the Committee on Finance, Planning and Economic Development in the 10th Parliament of Uganda.

Prior to his political career, Mulindwa worked as procurement consultant for Crown Group Inc and as a physical resources manager, a procurement clerk and deputy accountant for Makerere University. He began his professional career as a computer lab assistant for the Institute of Computer Science at the Ivory Tower.

== Early life and education ==
Mulindwa was born on 26 January 1983 in Nsenya-Namaliga Village, Lugazi Municipality, Buikwe District, in an Anglican family of the Baganda. He is the third-born of five children and the son of the late Emmanuel Mulindwa, a former banker and owner of New Kyaggwe Bus Company, and Sarah Namazzi Mulindwa, a caterer. He's the brother to Faridah Namulindwa, Ediriisa Mulindwa, Mariam Namulindwa and Moses mulindwa.

He had his primary education at Nkoyoyo Boarding Primary School Matale, where he was a dormitory prefect, and Lugazi East Primary School, where he attained his PLE certification in 1995.

He then attended Lugazi Progressive College School and 3Rs Secondary School Kasokoso for his O-Level education and Crane High School, Kampala for his A-Level education, attaining a UCE certification in 1999 and a UACE certification in 2001. He was a time keeper, a class monitor and a member of the Scripture Union at Lugazi Progressive College School.

Mulindwa further advanced to Makerere University, graduating in 2006 with a Bachelor's degree in Social Sciences: majoring in political science, social administration as well as gender & economics. He also attended the Chartered Institute of Procurement & Supply (CIPS), attaining full membership and a Certificate in Procurement and Supply Operations (MCIPS) in 2009.

Additionally, Mulindwa has a Certificate in Strategic Procurement and Logistics Management (SPLM), a Certificate in Computer Applications and a Certificate in Information Technology Essentials I & II from Makerere University as well as a Certificate in Local Government & Decentralization from Uganda Management Institute.

== Career and politics ==
Mulindwa started his professional career in 2002 as a computer lab assistant for the Institute of Computer Science at the Makerere University. He then went on to work as a deputy accountant in 2003, a procurement clerk in 2004 and finally as a physical resources manager in 2005 and 2006 at the same institution of higher education. From 2008 to 2015, Mulindwa founded Crown Group Inc. where he worked as a procurement consultant among other capacities and did consultancy for German Development Service (DED), Mercy Corps, Save the Children International, The Carter Center, Handicap International, Oxfam Great Britain, UNWFP (South Sudan), UNOPS (South Sudan) to mention.

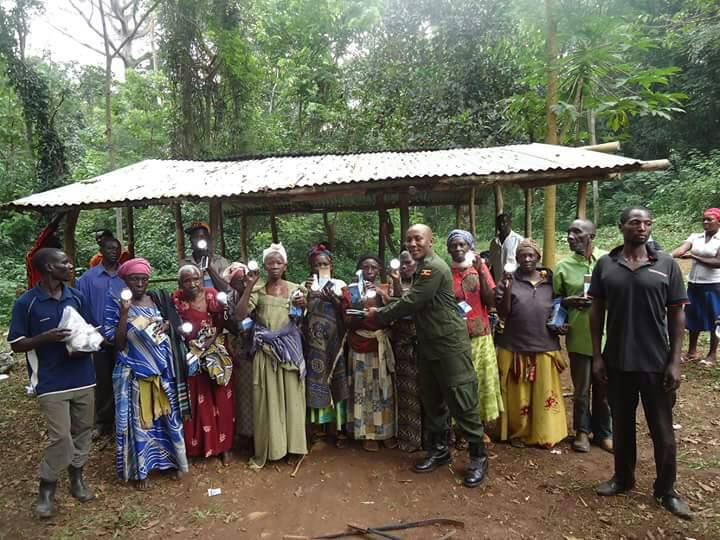
Mulindwa at a community cleanup event in 2017

In 2015, Mulindwa joined elective politics on the National Resistance Movement ticket and strategized for the 2016 polls a move that saw him win both the party's 2015 primary elections and the 2016 general elections thereby becoming a member of the 10th Parliament for the Pearl of Africa representing Lugazi Municipality in Buikwe District. In the 10th Parliament, Mulindwa serves on the Committee on Equal Opportunities and the Committee on Finance, Planning and Economic Development. He is also a member of the NRM Parliamentary Caucus, the Uganda Women's Parliamentary Association (UWOPA), the Uganda Parliamentary Forum for Children (UPFC), the Network for African Women Ministers and Parliamentarians (NAWMP), the Uganda Parliamentarians Forum on Food Security, Population and Development, the Uganda Parliamentary Forum on Youth Affairs (UPFYA), the Parliamentary Forum on Nutrition (PFN) and the Uganda Parliamentary Forum on Disaster Risk Reduction (UPFDRR).

== Personal life ==
Mulindwa is married to Annet Nankya Mulindwa and they have four children. He is the founding director for Crown Group Inc, a procurement and logistics consultancy firm in Uganda. He is also the director for Lugazi Vocational Institute.

== See also ==
- Buikwe District
- National Resistance Movement
- Parliament of Uganda
