= Diana Atwine =

Medical doctor and civil servant

Diana Kanzira Atwine
- Born: 1973 (age 52–53); Galiraya, Kayunga District; Uganda
- Citizenship: Uganda
- Education: Mbarara University (MBChB), (MMed in Internal Medicine)
- Occupations: Physician, Consultant Physician, Medical Administrator
- Years active: 1996 – present
- Known for: Medical knowledge Administrative skills
- Title: Permanent Secretary; Uganda Ministry of Health
- Spouse: Mr. Kanzira

Diana Kanzira Atwine (born in 1973), also Diana Atwiine, is a Ugandan medical doctor and civil servant. She is the incumbent Permanent Secretary of the Uganda Ministry of Health. She was appointed to that position on 4 November 2016 by Yoweri Museveni, the president of Uganda. She replaced Dr. Asumani Lukwago, who was transferred as Permanent Secretary to the Education Services Commission.

== Background and education ==
Atwine was born in 1973, in Galiraya, a small community on the southern shores of Lake Kyoga, in Kayunga District, in the Central Region of Uganda. She is the daughter of Ernest Rujundira and Joy Kensheka Rujundira, being their third-born.

She attended Bweranyangi Girls' Senior Secondary School for her middle school (O-Level) and Mount Saint Mary's College Namagunga for her high school (A-Level) education, graduating with a High School Diploma, from there. She was admitted to Mbarara University School of Medicine, where she pursued a Bachelor of Medicine and Bachelor of Surgery degree. Following that, she specialized in Internal Medicine and was awarded a Master of Medicine degree by the same university.

== Career ==
Dr Atwine worked for a brief period at St. Francis Hospital Nsambya, before she joined the Joint Clinical Research Centre (JCRC). From there she went to the State House of Uganda, where she was given the title of the President's Private Secretary in Charge of Medical Affairs. In that capacity, she served as one of President Museveni's personal physicians. In 2009, she was tasked to head what was officially known as the Medicine and Health Services Delivery Monitoring Unit, specifically tasked to investigate corruption in Uganda's Ministry of Health.

By June 2010, the unit that she headed had (a) uncovered an illegal racket by Ugandan and Kenyan officials who sell drugs across their common border (b) brought 78 cases to court (c) recovered stolen drugs worth more than Shs200 million (US$60,000) and (d) arrested at least 12 impostors, pretending to be qualified health workers, when not. Then in August 2010, she revealed nearly 300 ghost workers on the payroll of Mulago National Referral Hospital. In a reshuffle of permanent secretaries cabinet-wide, she was appointed to her current position, on 4 November 2016.

== Personal ==
Diana Atwine is married and is the mother of three children.

== See also ==
- Health in Uganda
- List of hospitals in Uganda
- Jane Aceng
