= Bayigga =

Bayigga is a surname. Notable people with the surname include:

- Justine Bayigga (born 1979), Ugandan sprinter
- Michael Lulume Bayigga, Ugandan physician
