= Isimba Hydroelectric Power Station =

Ugandan power station

- Map of Uganda showing the location of Isimba. Isimba Hydroelectric Power Station (Africa) Isimba Hydroelectric Power Station (Earth)
- Country: Uganda
- Location: Isimba, Kamuli District
- Coordinates: 00°46′18″N 33°02′32″E
- Purpose: Power
- Status: Operational
- Opening date: 21 March 2019
- Construction cost: US$567.7 million
- Owner: Government of Uganda
- Operator: Uganda Electricity Generation Company Limited

Dam and spillways
- Impounds: Victoria Nile

Power Station
- Commission date: 21 March 2019
- Turbines: 4 x 45.8 MW
- Installed capacity: 183.2 megawatts (245,700 hp)
- Annual generation: 1,039 GWh

Isimba Hydroelectric Power Station is a 183.2 megawatts (245,700 hp) hydroelectric power station commissioned on 21 March 2019 in Uganda. Construction of this dam began in April 2015 and was completed in January 2019. Commercial operations began on 21 March 2019.

== Location ==
The power station is located at the village of Isimba on the Victoria Nile, in Kamuli District. It is approximately 44 kilometres (27 mi) north of the Bujagali Hydroelectric Power Station. The geographical coordinates of Isimba Power Station are: 00°46'18.0"N, 33°02'32.0"E (Latitude:0.771667; Longitude:33.042222).

== Overview ==
The contract for a feasibility study and preparation of tender documents, worth US$3.8 million, was awarded to a consortium consisting of the engineering firms Fichtner (lead) and Norplan. A local Ugandan company, Kagga & Partners, was a sub-consultant to the consortium. Initial planned capacity at Isimba was to be at least 100 megawatts (130,000 hp).

In July 2013, Ugandan media reported that the construction contract had been awarded to the China International Water & Electric Corporation, a Chinese government-owned power company. The generation capacity had been increased to 183.2 megawatts. Construction was expected to last 34 months. In January 2018, following the expiry of their 40-month contract, Energy Infratech Private Limited, from India, handed over to a new supervising engineering consortium. The consortium comprises Artelia EAU & Environment from France and local company KKATT Consult Limited. Completion is now expected in August 2018. As of April 2018, according to the Uganda Electricity Generation Company Limited, the project was 86 percent complete, with total cost quoted at US$567.7 million.

The most recent design includes a 0.5 kilometres (1,600 ft) bridge on top of the power station that will span the Victoria Nile and provide another crossing across the river. However, the road over the dam was one lane instead of the two lanes in the design, and was deemed unusable. The contractor was instructed by the government of Uganda, to construct a 3.5 kilometres (2 mi) public bridge, downstream of Isimba Dam, at a cost of USh24 billion (US$6.7 million). Work on the public bridge is expected to conclude in December 2020.

== Construction costs ==
The total project cost was originally estimated at US$350 million. In 2008, the Ugandan government secured a loan from the Export-Import Bank of India to fund the construction. In April 2013, Ugandan print media reported that the government of India had extended a credit line worth US$450 million (about UGX:1.1 trillion) for construction of the dam.

In July 2013, media reports indicated that the cost of the dam had risen to US$570 million (about UGX:1.4 trillion), funded by a loan from the Export-Import Bank of China. In March 2015, the Ugandan Parliament authorized the Ugandan government to borrow US$482.5 million (about UGX:1.4 trillion) from China Exim Bank at 2 percent annual interest repayable over 20 years, with a five-year grace period. Uganda will contribute the remaining US$107 million to the project, for a total cost of US$589.5 million. A new 132 kilovolt transmission line was constructed to evacuate the generated power and integrate it into the national grid at the Bujagali Power Station.

== Funding ==
The table below illustrates the funding sources for the power station alone, without the related power line, road and other infrastructure.

Sources of Funding for Isimba Hydroelectric Power Station
Rank	Name of Development Partner	Funding in USD (Millions)	Percentage
1	Exim Bank of China	482.5	85.0
2	Government of Uganda	85.2	15.0
	Total	567.7	100.00

== Operations ==
The power station is operated by the Uganda Electricity Generation Company Limited, a government-owned electricity generating company.

== See also ==
- List of power stations in Uganda
- Kayunga–Busaana–Nabuganyi Road
- Kayunga District
