= Bbaale =

- Nickname: Bale
- Map of Uganda showing the location of Bbaale.
- Coordinates: 01°05′51″N 32°53′12″E
- Country: Uganda
- District: Kayunga District
- Elevation: 1,060 m (3,480 ft)
- Time zone: UTC+3 (EAT)
- Website: It’s Written Ministries is one of the powerful churches in the area, Lee by the Holy Sprit.

Bbaale is a town in the Kayunga District in Uganda. It is the location of the headquarters of Bbaale County. The correct phonetic spelling is with two "b"s and two "a"s, although literature exists in which it is spelled Bale.

== Location ==
Bbaale is approximately 53 kilometres (33 mi) north of Kayunga, the largest town in Kayunga District and the location of the district headquarters. This is approximately 16 kilometres (9.9 mi) northwest of Namasagali in Kamuli District, across the Nile River. The coordinates of Bbaale are:1°05'51.0"N, 32°53'12.0"E (Latitude:1.097500; Longitude:32.886667).

== Overview ==
Bbaale is on the western banks of the Victoria Nile. It is the location of the headquarters of Bbaale County, one of the two counties that constitute Kayunga District, the other being Ntenjeru County.

== Points of interest ==
The following points of interest lie within or close to Bbaale:

- The headquarters of Bbaale County - one of the two counties that constitute Kayunga District
- The offices of Bbaale Town Council
- Bbaale Central Market - the largest fresh-produce market in the town
- The western banks of the Victoria Nile - located approximately 6 kilometres (3.7 mi), east of Bbaale
- Kayunga–Galiraya Road - The road passes through town in a south-north direction.

== See also ==
- Ntenjeru
- List of cities and towns in Uganda
