= Sezibwa River =

Sezibwa
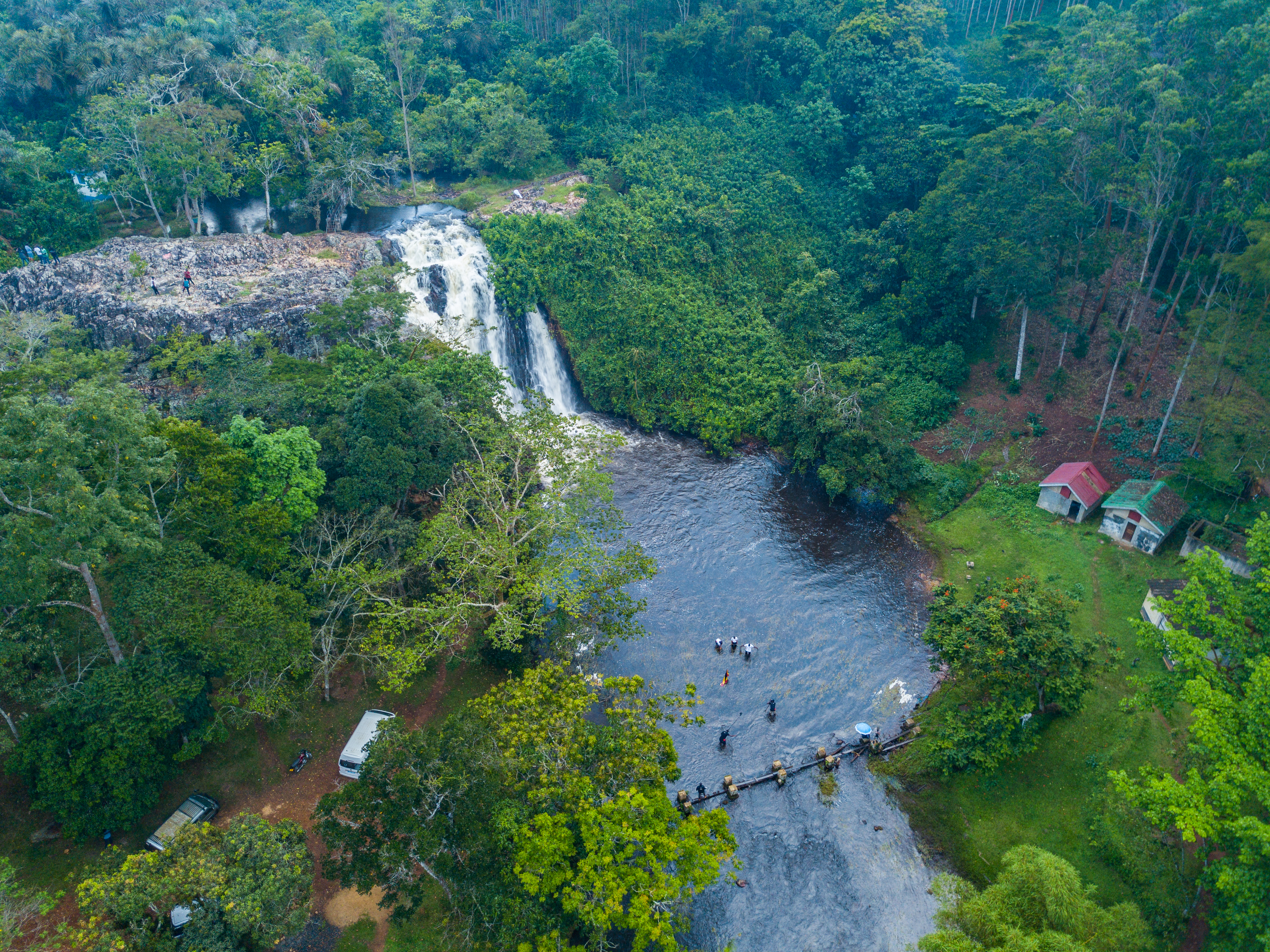
- Etymology: "Sizibwa" (Luganda):..my path cannot be blocked..

Location
- Country: Uganda
- Cities: Ngogwe, Kayunga, Galiraya

Physical characteristics
- Source: Ngogwe, Buikwe District
  - location: Uganda
  - coordinates: 00°16′12″N 33°00′18″E
  - elevation: 1,200 m (3,900 ft)
- Mouth
  - location: Lake Kyoga, Kayunga District, Uganda
  - coordinates: 01°24′00″N 32°44′06″E
  - elevation: 1,140 m (3,740 ft)
- Length: 150 km (93 mi)

The Sezibwa River is a river in Central Uganda, in East Africa. The name is derived from the Luganda phrase "sizibirwa kkubo", which translates into "my path cannot be blocked".

== Location ==
River Sezibwa is located in the south-central part of Uganda. It starts from the wetlands between Lake Victoria and Lake Kyoga, west of the Victoria Nile and flows in a general northerly direction to empty into Lake Kyoga. The source of River Sezibwa is located in Buikwe District, near the town of Ngogwe, with coordinates: Latitude:0.2700; Longitude:33.0050. The Sezibwa enters Lake Kyoga in Kayunga District, near the town of Galilaya, with coordinates: Latitude:1.3700; Longitude:32.8150. The length of River Sezibwa is approximately 150 kilometres (93 mi) from source to mouth. Between its source in Buikwe District, but before it enters Kayunga District, the river flows through Mukono District.

== Legend ==
According to legend, the Ssezibwa River is not a natural phenomenon, but the progeny of a pregnant woman called Nakangu, who lived many hundreds of years ago and belonged to the Kibe (fox) clan. She was expected to give birth to twins, but instead what poured from her womb were twin rivers. The spirits of Nakangu's unborn children - Ssezibwa and Mubeeya are believed to inhibit the twin rivers for which reason it used to be customary for any Muganda passing the river's source at Namukono, some 20 km further east, to throw a handful of grass or stones into the river for good luck. Even today, a thanksgiving sacrifice of barkcloth, beer and a cockerel is made at the river's source every year, usually led by a Ssalongo (father of twins).

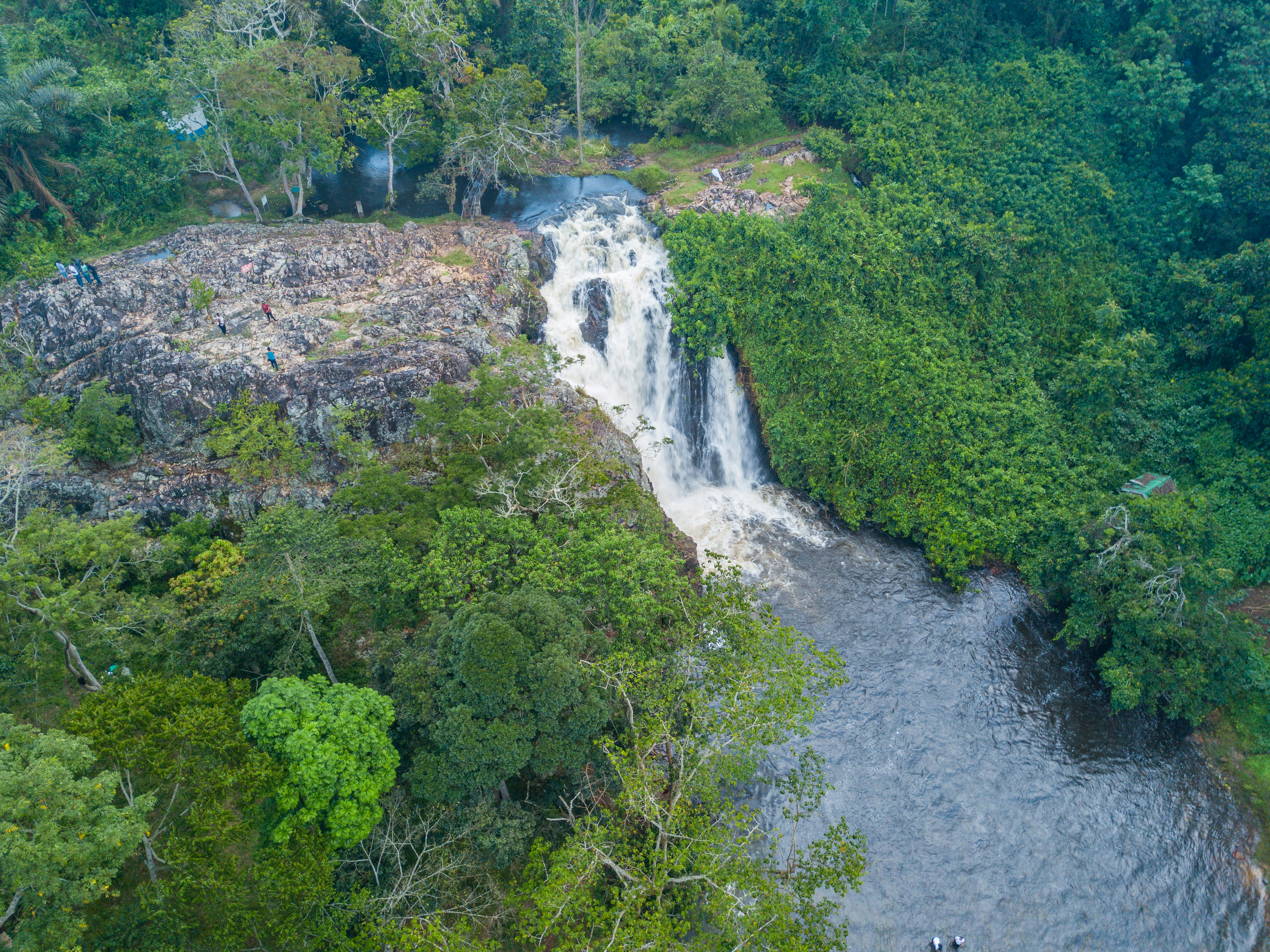
ssezibwa falls

== Sezibwa Falls ==
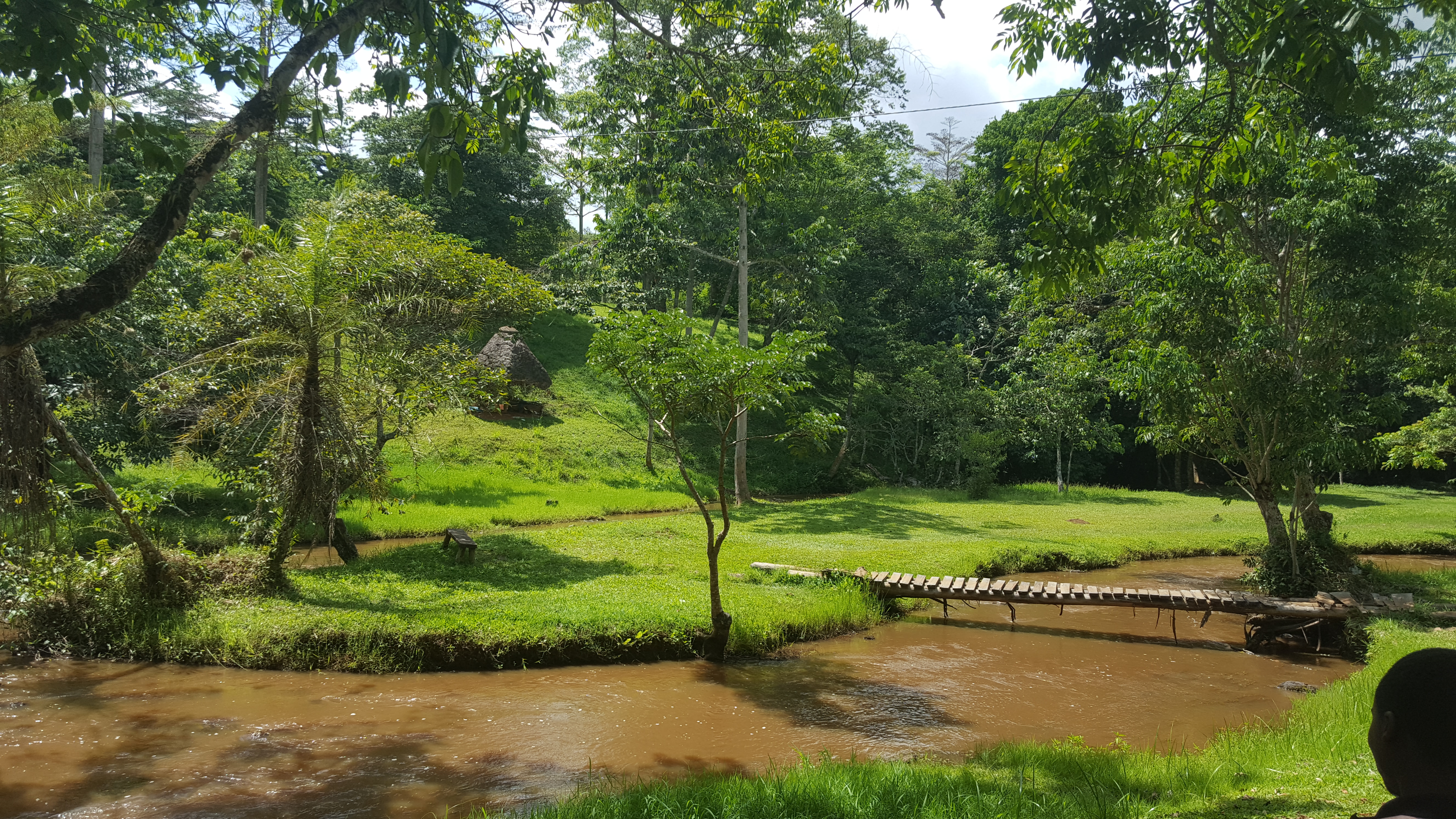
River Sezibwa

The Sezibwa Falls are approximately 20 miles (32 km), east of Kampala, Uganda's capital, along the Kampala-Jinja Highway. The site is a Buganda Heritage Site. It is marked with an out-span of sharp-edged rocks and the magnificent sound of soothing waters flowing down the steep ridged stones. The Falls are located in Mukono District.

According to traditional legend, the two rivers named Ssezibwa and its brother Bwanda, were born by a woman on her way to Kavuma Bukunja. The woman, Nakangu Tebateesa, whose husband was called Nsubuga Ssebwaato, gave birth to twins in form of water, whereupon Sezibwa flowed west, passing many obstacles and deriving its name, while Bwanda flowed east, toward Nyenga. Many people come to the place for miracles as they believe the site has supernatural powers.

The falls are 7 metres (23 ft) high. Rock climbing and bird watching are the main activities at the site. Geologists and other scientists also frequent the site. Wildlife in the surrounding forest includes bush monkeys, red-tailed monkeys and other primates and birds.

== See also ==
- Lake Victoria
- Lake Kyoga
- Victoria Nile
- Kayunga
