= Buikwe =

Buikwe Buyikwe
- Town
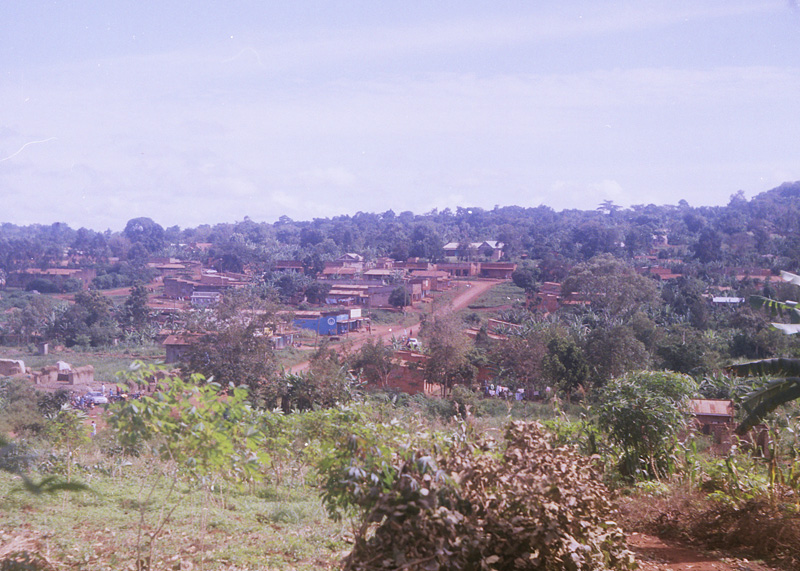
- Buikwe, Buikwe District, Uganda

- Location in Uganda
- Coordinates: 00°20′39″N 33°01′48″E
- Country: Uganda
- Region: Central Region
- District: Buikwe District
- County: Buikwe County
- Constituency: Buikwe South

Government
  - Member of Parliament: Lulume Bayigga
- Elevation: 4,049 ft (1,234 m)

Population (2014 Census)
  - Total: 18,500
- Website: Homepage

Buikwe, sometimes spelled Buyikwe, is a town in Buikwe District, Uganda. It is the administrative center of the district and the location of the district headquarters.

== Location ==
Buikwe is approximately 67 kilometres (42 mi) east of Kampala, Uganda's capital and largest city and 11 kilometres (7 mi) south-east of Lugazi, the nearest large town. The coordinates of Buikwe Town Council are 0°20'36.0"N, 33°01'44.0"E (Latitude:0.343333; Longitude:33.028889).

== Overview ==
Buikwe is a small town in the south-east of the Central Region. It is the home base of the Nalubaale Football Club.

== Population ==
On 27 August 2014, the national population census put Buikwe's population at 16,633. In 2015, the Uganda Bureau of Statistics (UBOS), estimated the population of Buikwe at 16,800 people. In 2020, he population agency estimated the mid-year population of the town at 18,500, of whom 9,700 (52.4 percent) were female and 8,800 (47.6 percent) were male. UBOS calculated the annual rate of population growth of the town to average 1.95 percent annually, between 2015 and 2020.

Historical population
Year	Pop.	±%
2014	16,633	—
2015	16,800	+1.0%
2020	18,500	+10.1%

== Points of interest ==
The following points of interest are found in or near Buikwe Town Council.

The offices of Buikwe District Administration, the offices of Buikwe Town Council and Buikwe Central Market. Also found here is St. Charles Lwanga Buikwe Hospital, an 80-bed community hospital founded by missionaries from the Czech Republic.

The town also hosts a number of places of worship; including Buikwe Full Gospel Church, affiliated with the Pentecostal Movement, Buikwe Church of Uganda, Buikwe Seventh Day Adventist Church and Buikwe Roman Catholic Church.

== See also ==
- Lugazi
- Ngogwe
- Njeru
- Nkokonjeru
- List of cities and towns in Uganda
