= Jane Fualal Odubu =

Jane Fualal Odubu is a Ugandan medical doctor and civil servant working in Mulago National Referral Hospital in Kampala. She was born in Westnile region in Zombo district. She is the head of Breast and Endocrine Unit at Mulago Hospital. Odubu is a Honorary Senior lecturer at Makerere University College of Health Sciences. in her medical careers, she has performed successful surgeries in her 26 years of service in the medical practice.

== Education and background ==
Jane Odubu was born in Westnile region, Zombo district to Bertha Cege who lived in Muhagi district in Democratic Republic of Congo. Odubu's father, Micheal Bipenjonga worked in the police force to educate his children. She served for 3 years in Northern Uganda after completing medical school at Makerere University. She then enrolled for her postgraduate Masters of Medicine (Surgery) program at Makerere University from 1993 to 1996. from 1996 to 2002, she served at Mulago Hospital as the Medical Officer Special Grade where she became a Consultant Surgeon from 2002 to 2012 and now currently a Senior Consultant Surgeon.

In October 2002, she pioneered the Endocrine specialty in Uganda which led to its establishment as a unit at Mulago National Referral and Teaching Hospital to handle Breast Cancer care in Uganda.

== Career ==
Odubu serves as the patron for Women in Surgery Africa (WiSA). She was the first female president of the Association of Surgeons of Uganda, and also the first female president of College of Surgeons for East Central and Southern Africa (COSECSA). Also, she is the chairperson of Uganda Medical Board and the International Students' coordinator at the college of Health Sciences at the department of surgery. In this role, she coordinates students around the world.

In her career, as a thyroid specialist, she has treated patients in rural areas while working with Africa Medical Research and Education Foundation (AMREF). She is a board council member at Kampala International University.

== Personal life ==
Odubu is a mother to three children. She raised her children alone after their father died in 2004. Her children nicknamed her "The lion of Zombo."

== Awards ==
- In 2016, His Excellency President Yoweri Museveni, president of the republic of Uganda awarded her a medal in recognition of her work.
- An Honorary Fellowship by the Royal College of Physicians and Surgeons of Glasgow.
