= Rural Agency for Sustainable Development =

The Rural Agency for Sustainable Development (RASD) is an NGO based in the Ugandan town of Nkokonjeru. It was first established as a CBO in 2000 before gaining NGO status in 2005, serving communities in the wider Buikwe, Kayunga and Mukono District around Nkokonjeru. RASD has received broad support from the community through private donations and volunteer efforts as well as from the local government of the Nkokonjeru Town Council and Mayor. Engineers Without Borders groups from the University of California, Davis and Duke University have assisted RASD with new technology implementation. EWB-UK have recently started sending students on 3 month placements to help with ongoing RASD projects.

== Mission ==
In coordination with local government and other motivated organizations, RASD strives to alleviate poverty in the Buikwe, Mukono and Kayunga districts by improving the health and economic opportunities of the communities. The focus of accomplishing this mission resolution is through development and coordination of programs for the benefit of the communities. The various programs encompass general health improvement, assistance for orphans, water quality and availability, sanitation, vocational training, and agricultural needs.

== Programs ==
Notable programs at RASD include:

- Vocational education

There are schools for hairdressing, carpentry, catering and nursery offered at RASD. Volunteer-taught classes provide students who do not have enough money for university-level education an alternative way to learn skills that will let them earn a successful living.

2013 Update: None of these projects are currently funded or staffed. There is currently no vocational education occurring at RASD.

- Water Treatment

From the initial visit by Engineers Without Borders from the University of California, Davis, point-of-use water treatment was expressed as a priority of RASD. Following extensive trials of four treatment technologies, a biosand filter mold and training to build biosand filters was provided to RASD. The biosand filters are now an ongoing program of RASD in building and marketing the filters to the local community members. RASD marketing program includes micro-financing through their community backed finance institution.

2013 Update: Biosand filter production and distribution is currently not happening. Filters were initially distributed free of charge to recipients, which has now made it impossible to move this program into a sustainable business-oriented model where the organization is able to sell filters rather than distribute them. There are no funds to continue to distribute them free of charge, which means the project is virtually defunct.

- Internet café

In 2008 students from Duke University brought two computers and established an Internet router at RASD. For a nominal fee, members of the community can use these computers for web access.

2013 Update: The Internet cafe started by Duke students was not operational and computers are currently out of use. In 2013 another student group from Miami of Ohio University was recommended by RASD to fund an internet cafe where computer classes would be taught and community members would pay to use the internet services. Five computers and an Internet package were purchased from funds raised by Miami students. Since the departure of the Miami students, no classes have been held and no funds devoted to maintaining Internet services for community use.

Another priority of RASD was improved sanitation. Students from University of California, Davis designed and constructed an un-reinforced dome slab toilet. Further funding allowed twenty to thirty of these latrines to be constructed at households in the community. The dome slab design has been updated with an improved ventilated unit. EcoSan urine-diversion toilets have also been designed, and a working model is at RASD.

2013 Update: RASD continues to promote the dome-slab technology if student groups are available to fund and construct the toilets. Dome-slab toilet construction is currently not an ongoing part of RASD's activities.

- Hand Washing Stations

Students from University of California, Davis also introduced hand-washing stations and developed hygiene training programs for RASD which have been held with community children in local schools and at RASD.

2013 Update: RASD has no on-going program promoting hand washing stations.

- Fuel Efficient Stoves

Most cooking is still done balancing a pot on three rocks with firewood below. The open cook fires produce excessive smoke and require ample firewood. Students from the University of California, Davis introduced more efficient wood-burning stoves which are made cheaply from local materials. RASD has taught a number of local youth to build these stoves for community member, providing minimal employment.

2013 Update: The fuel efficient stoves promoted by University of California, Davis was found to be too expensive for local residents to purchase. No fuel efficient stoves have been made or distributed.

- Solar power

The Internet café runs off a solar power generator. This also allows residents to charge cell phones and other small appliances without having to depend on power from the local grid.

2013 Update: Solar power is still operating at RASD. Residents can still charge their cell phones and small appliances using solar power.

- Rainwater harvesting

To assist RASD in keeping students in school and healthy, students from University of California, Davis helped RASD acquire Interlocking Soil Stabilized Brick (ISSB) making equipment from Makerere University in Kampala. The ISSB technology provides RASD with the ability to produce institutional sized water tanks for schools and clinics. Further research is underway to find economical household scale harvesting tanks.

2013: RASD is not currently constructing any ISSB tanks.

== Notable Projects ==
Notable projects by RASD include:

- Peace Corp Assistance

When a Peace Corp Volunteer recognized that she was not getting very good coverage of her education program through the school due to low attendance, she enlisted RASD to reach out and develop community-based education programs.

- US Embassy Grant

Recognizing the abilities of RASD, the US Embassy provided a small grant to enable RASD to provide biosand filters and dome-slab toilets to 50 families impacted by HIV/AIDS.

- USAID

Another NGO with funding from USAID enlisted the abilities of RASD to help them establish a dome-slab toilet production project in the Tororo District in eastern Uganda.

- Engineers Without Borders

RASD initiated and coordinated an arrangement with the Nkokonjeru Town Council and students from University of California, Davis to provide training, tools and spare parts for the repair of local borehole pumps. The Town Council provided a plumber to be trained and to provide future routine maintenance and repairs, students from University of California, Davis provided tools and training, while RASD provided the coordination and the creation of local water pump committees to ensure future maintenance schedules are maintained and pumps receive appropriate protection and treatment. Only 2 of 13 local pumps were operational when the program started and all were repaired and have since been maintained operational.

The Horticultural Collaborative Support Programme (HortCRSP) is a USAID funded project through the University of California Davis that is currently going on at RASD. It kicked off in October 2010 and will end in September 2013, and its objective is to promote production and marketing of Indigenous leafy greens among small holder farmers in Buikwe and Mukono districts-Central Uganda. This project involves multiple partners that include;University of California Davis, Makerere University, Mukono Zonal Agricultural and Development Institute (MUZARDI) and Uganda Christian University Mukono. The project is using two participatory agricultural development models that are increasingly gaining popularity worldwide in agricultural research and development work. These are the Farmer Field Schools and Participatory Market Chain Approaches that help farmers in addressing production and marketing constraints respectively. RASD's role in the project has been to mobilize farmers to participate in the project activities as well as providing technical back-stopping to farmers. RASD has also helped in coordinating the research activities of the different partners in this project. These include providing research assistance to the graduate students (PhD and Masters) attached to the project, through mobilizing farmers for surveys and interviews as well as providing internship placements for Undergraduate students in fields of Social work, Agriculture and Community Development.

2013 Update: Hort CRSP project activities ended in 2013.

== See also ==
- Website
