= Bbaale County =

- County and parliamentary constituency
- Interactive map of Bbaale County
- Coordinates: 1°06′N 32°54′E
- Country: Uganda
- Region: Central Region
- District: Kayunga District

Population (2024)
  - Total: 185,341
- Time zone: UTC+3 (EAT)

Bbaale County is a county in the Kayunga District in Uganda. It occupies the northern half of the district. It contains four sub-counties. It is represented in the Uganda Parliament by Charles Tebandeke who succeeded Sulaiman Madada, who served as the State Minister for the Elderly and the Disabled.

== Location ==
Bbaale is located about 45 km from Kayunga Town.

== Administration ==
Bbaale County includes four rural sub-counties: Bbaale, Galiraya, Kayonza, and Kitimbwa.

=== Sub-Counties ===
- Bbaale Sub-county
- Garilaya Sub-county
- Kayonza Sub-county
- Kitimbwa Sub-county

== Population ==
According to 2024 estimates from the Uganda Bureau of Statistics, Bbaale County's total population is about 185,341 people and it accommodates the most Banyala. This includes all four sub‑counties: Bbaale, Galiraya, Kayonza, and Kitimbwa.The county is affected by land grabbing where almost 40 percent of the population is under threat to be evicted. on 9th October 2023, some political leaders staged a peaceful demonstration which was named "Black independence" over unfullfiled presidential pledges which includes the failure to tarmac Kayunga - Galilaaya road which was promised in 2001.

== Geography ==
The Kayunga–Bbaale–Galiraya road corridor ends at Kawongo Landing Site on the shores of Lake Kyoga in Galiraya. The corridor links communities in Kayunga District with lake transport routes and districts across Lake Kyoga.

== Economy and livelihoods ==
The 2014 census profile for Bbaale County Constituency reported high involvement in household agriculture:

- Households engaged in crop growing: 26,607 (90.1%).
- Households engaged in maize growing: 24,453 (82.8%).
- Households engaged in sweet potato growing: 13,928 (47.1%).
- Households engaged in livestock farming: 17,855 (60.4%).

== Education and literacy ==
In the 2014 census profile for Bbaale County Constituency:

- Primary school attendance (ages 6–12): 84.6%.
- Secondary school attendance (ages 13–18): 34.3%.
- Adult literacy (ages 10+): 65.7%.
- Adult illiteracy (ages 10+): 34.3%.

== Housing and energy ==
In the 2014 census profile for Bbaale County Constituency:

- Households with access to electricity for lighting: 2,353 (8.0%).
- Households using tadooba for lighting: 22,226 (75.2%).

== Transport ==
Bbaale County lies on the Kayunga–Bbaale–Galiraya Road, an 87 km route planned for upgrading from gravel to paved standard under a prefinancing arrangement, with an estimated cost of UGX 313.2 billion (inclusive of taxes). The project scope includes a ferry landing site at Kawongo on Lake Kyoga for future ferry routes (including links to Zengebe and Namasale), plus tarmacking of selected urban roads and street lighting in selected centres.

== Politics ==
Bbaale County elects a Member of Parliament. Hon. Charles Tebandeke (National Unity Platform) serves as the constituency MP. A 2022 Court of Appeal decision upheld Tebandeke’s 2021 election win; the report cited 12,753 votes for Tebandeke and 4,840 votes for Ronald Mukasa Maiteki.

== See also ==
- Kayunga District
- Central Region, Uganda
- Parliament of Uganda
- Kayunga–Galiraya Road
