= Nkokonjeru =

- Location in Uganda
- Coordinates: 00°14′22″N 32°55′23″E
- Country: Uganda
- Region: Central Region of Uganda
- District: Buikwe District
- Elevation: 3,900 ft (1,200 m)

Population (2020 Estimate)
  - Total: 10,100

Nkokonjeru is a town council in Buikwe District in the Central Region of Uganda with villages such as: Namaliiri, Kigulu, Mulajje, Naziwanga, Ndolwa, Buira, Bukasa, Wabiduuku, Nsuube and Nkokonjeru Central. The town's name means "White Chicken".

== Geography ==
Nkokonjeru is approximately 16 kilometres (9.9 mi) southwest of Buikwe, the location of the district headquarters. The town is approximately 44 kilometres (27 mi), by road, southwest of Njeru, the largest urban centre in the district.

This is approximately 55 kilometres (34 mi), by road, southeast of Kampala, the capital and largest city of Uganda. The coordinates of Nkokonjeru are 0°14'22.0"N, 32°55'23.0"E (Latitude:0.239444; Longitude:32.923056).

== Overview ==
Nkokonjeru was the location of a traditional shrine where the Baganda used to sacrifice white chicken prior to 1890. In 1891, the Mill Hill Fathers established a Catholic Parish in the area. When lightning felled the sacrifice tree, the missionaries used the wood to burn bricks and build the Parish Church. Subsequently, they built schools, a hospital and a teacher's college. The Catholic Parish of Nkonkonjeru had over 45,000 registered parishioners, as of August 2009.

== Population ==
In 2015, the Uganda Bureau of Statistics (UBOS), estimated the mid-year population of Nkokonjeru at 9,200. In 2020, the population agency estimated the population of the town at 10,100. Of these, an estimated 5,400 (53.5 percent) were females and an estimated 4,700 (46.5 percent) were males. UBOS calculated the average annual population growth rate of the town at 1.88 percent, between 2015 and 2020.

== Points of interest ==
The following points of interest lie within or near Nkokonjeru:

1. The offices of Nkokonjeru Town Council

2. Nkokonjeru Church of Uganda Primary School

3. St. Paul's Primary School, Nkokonjeru

4. St. Peter's Secondary School, Nkokonjeru

5. Nkokonjeru Teacher Training College

6. Nkokonjeru Technical College

7. Nkokonjeru Roman Catholic Church

8. Stella Maris Boarding Primary School, Nsuube

9. Stella Maris College, Nsuube

10. St. Alphonsus Demonstration School

11. St. Anthony Convent Secondary School

12. Rural Agency for Sustainable Development, a Non-governmental organization

13. Nkokonjeru Savings and Credit Co-operative

14. Mother Kevin Vocation Institute

15. The Mukono–Kyetume–Katosi–Nyenga Road, passes through the middle of town in a general east to west direction

16. St. Francis Hospital Nkokonjeru, a 60-bed community hospital administered by the Roman Catholic Diocese of Lugazi

== See also ==
- Hospitals in Uganda
- List of roads in Uganda
- List of cities and towns in Uganda
