= Michael Lulume Bayigga =

Ugandan physician and politician (born 1970)

Michael Phillip Lulume Bayigga
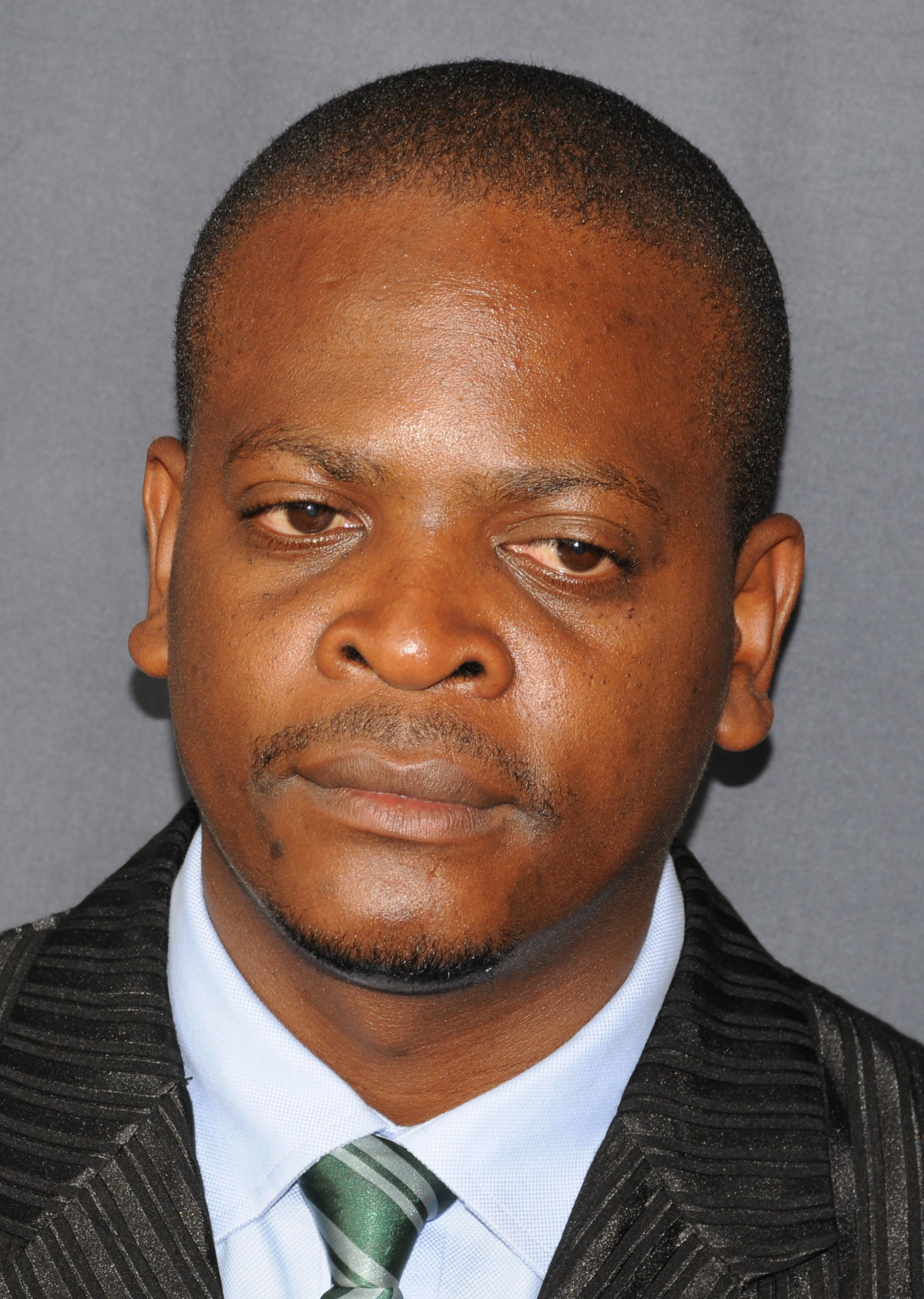
- Born: 1 May 1970 (age 56); Uganda
- Citizenship: Uganda
- Education: Makerere University (Bachelor of Medicine and Bachelor of Surgery); University of Zimbabwe (Master of Arts in Policy Studies)
- Occupations: Physician, politician
- Years active: 2004–present
- Known for: Politics
- Spouse: Dr. Esther Bayigga

Michael Phillip Lulume Bayigga (born 1 May 1970) is a Ugandan physician and politician. He served as the Acting Secretary General of the Democratic Party from 2007 to 2010.He is also a Member of Parliament representing Buikwe South Constituency in Buikwe District. and Director of Kampala International Medical Centre, Kansanga, Kampala.

== Early life and education ==
Michael was born on 1 May 1970. He attended St.. Paul's Boys Primary School in Nkokonjeru, for his elementary education. He studied at Kyambogo College School in Kyambogo, Kampala, for both his O-Level and A-Level studies. In 1991, he joined Makerere University School of Medicine, graduating in 1996 with the degrees of Bachelor of Medicine and Bachelor of Surgery (MBChB). In 2004, he joined the Southern African Regional Institute for Policy Studies, at the University of Zimbabwe, and graduated with a Master of Policy Studies.

== Career ==
In 1997, he began to work at "Nsambya General Clinic", a private medical practice, as the deputy director, a position he still holds today. That same year, he was elected executive director of the Uganda Medical Volunteers' Association, an NGO, a position he still serves in today. He first entered politics in 2006 when he unsuccessfully contested for the Buikwe County South constituency seat against one Anthony Mukasa of the National Resistance Movement (NRM) party. Bayiga, however, petitioned the courts and the Uganda Supreme Court nullified the results on account of Mukasa having bribed voters. In the by-elections held in May 2008, Bayigga trounced his opponent and was sworn in as the Member of Parliament (MP) for the constituency on Wednesday, May 7, 2007. He was re-elected in 2011. He lost the seat to David Mutebi and petitioned the high court; however, justice David Butema overruled Dr Bayiga, saying he had presented forged evidence to support his petition.

In 2026 Bayiga made a surprise move as a member of parliament for Buikwe left the Democratic Party (DP) and joined the People's Front for Freedom (PFF). While addressing a small crowd of supporters, he made the announcement. Bayiga said his decision was based on his belief that Uganda needs a stronger and more united opposition.

== Other considerations ==
Dr. Lulume Bayiga is married to Dr. Esther Bayigga. He is reported to enjoy debating, table tennis and practising medicine. He sits on the parliamentary committee on foreign affairs and on the committee for the budget. Dr. Lulume is an advocate for good health services.

== See also ==
- List of political parties in Uganda
- List of hospitals in Uganda
- Parliament of Uganda
