= Kayunga =

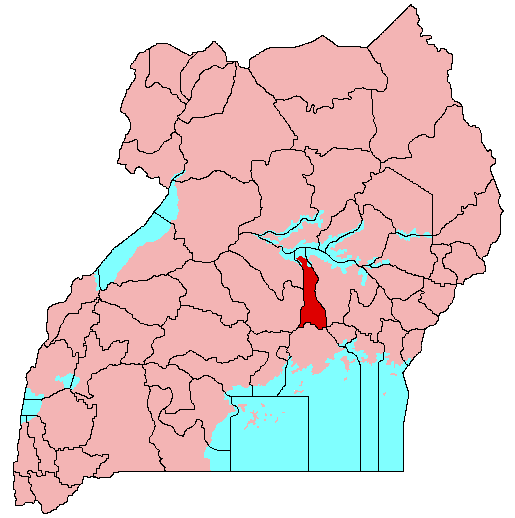
- Kayunga

- Map of Uganda showing the location of Kayunga.
- Coordinates: 00°42′12″N 32°54′13″E
- Country: Uganda
- Region: Central Region of Uganda
- District: Kayunga District
- County: Ntenjeru County
- Elevation: 1,063 m (3,488 ft)

Population (2020 Estimate)
  - Total: 30,000
- Time zone: UTC+3 (EAT)

Kayunga is a town in the Central Region of Uganda. It is the main municipal, administrative, and commercial center of Kayunga District.

== Location ==
Kayunga is approximately 72 kilometres (45 mi) northeast of Kampala, Uganda's capital and largest city, on an all-weather tarmac highway. It lies 49 kilometres (30 mi) northwest of the city of Jinja, Uganda's second industrial city, also on an all-weather tarmac highway.

The coordinates of the town are 0°42'12.0"N, 32°54'13.0"E (Latitude:0.703333; Longitude:32.903611). Kayunga Town sits at an average elevation of 1,063 metres (3,488 ft) above average sea level.

== Population ==
According to the last national population census of 2002, Kayunga town had a population of about 19,800. In 2010, the Uganda Bureau of Statistics (UBOS) estimated the population at 23,100. According to UBOS, the mid-year population was estimated at 23,600 in 2011. In 2014, the national population census put the population at 26,588.

In 2015 UBOS estimated the population of Kayunga Town at 27,400. In 2020, he population agency estimated the id-year population at 30,000 people. Of these, 15,600 (52 percent) were females and 14,400 (48 percent) were males. UBOS calculated the growth rate of Kayunga's population to average 1.8 percent every year, between 2015 and 2020.

Historical population
Year	Pop.	±%
2002	19,800	—
2010	23,100	+16.7%
2011	23,600	+2.2%
2014	26,588	+12.7%
2015	27,400	+3.1%
2020	30,000	+9.5%

== Points of interest ==
The following points of interest are located within or close to the town limits:

The offices of Kayunga Town Council and Kayunga District Administration are located in the center of town. Also located here are the head office of Kayunga Journalists Association and the headquarters of Rural Initiative for Development and Empowerment (RIDE-UGANDA), a non-government organisation, as well as Kayunga Central Market.

In the middle of town, is the 200-bed Kayunga Regional Referral Hospital. The facility was renovated and expanded between 2018 and 2021, at a cost of USh70 billion (approx. US$20 million at that time).

The southern end of the Kayunga–Galiraya Road is located in the centre of town. Also, the western end of Kayunga–Busaana–Nabuganyi Road is located in Kayunga. The 183 megawatts Isimba Hydroelectric Power Station is located 21 kilometres (13 mi), by road, northeast of the town of Kayunga.
