= Buikwe District =

- District
- District location in Uganda
- Coordinates: 00°21′N 33°02′E
- Country: Uganda
- Region: Central Uganda
- Capital: Buikwe

Area
  - Land: 1,244.7 km^{2} (480.6 sq mi)

Population (2012 Estimate)
  - Total: 429,600
  - Density: 345.1/km^{2} (894/sq mi)
- Time zone: UTC+3 (EAT)
- Website: www.buikwe.go.ug

Buikwe District is a district in the Central Region of Uganda. It is named after its 'chief town', Buikwe, where the district headquarters are located.

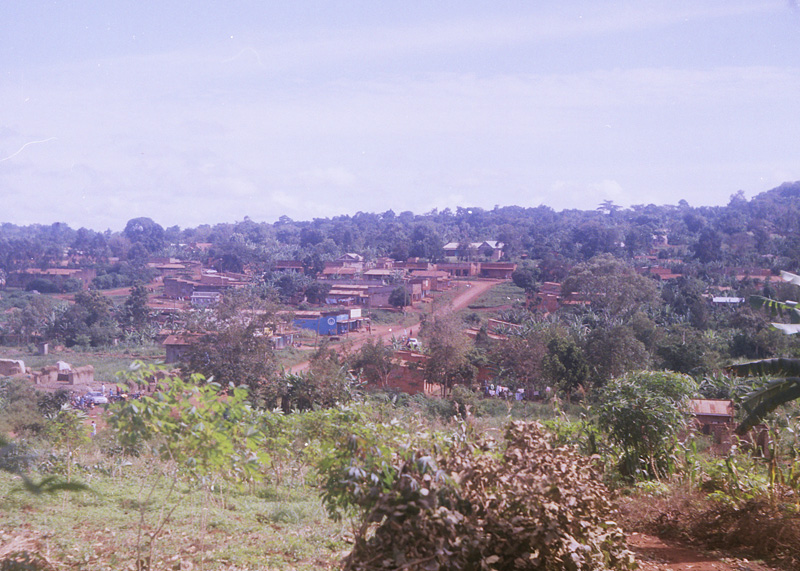
Buikwe.

== Location ==
Buikwe District is bordered by Kayunga District to the north, Jinja District to the east, Buvuma District to the southeast, the Republic of Tanzania to the south and Mukono District to the west. The district headquarters at Buikwe are located approximately 60 kilometres (37 mi), by road, east of Kampala, the capital of Uganda and the country's largest city. This location is approximately 14 kilometres (8.7 mi), by road, southeast of Lugazi, the nearest large town. The coordinates of the district are:00 21N, 33 02E.

== Overview ==
Buikwe District was created by an Act of Parliament and it commenced operations on 1 July 2009. Prior to that, it was part of Mukono District.

== Population ==
The 1991 national population census estimated the district population at about 250,500. The national census in 2002 estimated the population of Buikwe District at approximately 329,900. In 2012, the population of the district was estimated at 429,600. As of the year 2024 the estimated population was 520,158.

== Tourist attractions ==
Mabira Forest Reserve

Mabira forest is located in the tropics north of the shoreline of Lake Victoria, immediately to the west of the River Nile. Mabira covers an area of 306 square kilometres (118 mi^{2}). It is the biggest forest reserve in central Uganda and one of the few surviving rainforests remaining in Uganda.

Mabira is well known for Ecotourism which started in the early 1980s. The forest harbors in excess of 300 species of birds, many of which are rare; including the pied hornbill, superb sunbird, grey parrot, crowned eagle, black-billed turacos and the endangered Nahan's Frankolin. There are over 300 plant species, some of which are of medicinal value.

Among the services offered to tourists are guided forest walks, camping sites, picnic sites and environmental education and entertainment with local drama groups. There is a network of trails to facilitate the exploration of the forest.

River Nile

The Nile is the world's second-longest river, measuring an estimated 4,000 miles (6,400 km) in length. It starts its journey on the outskirts of Jinja and traverses Uganda, southern Sudan, Sudan and Egypt to empty into the Mediterranean Sea at Alexandria. The river is of great geographical and historical importance locally and internationally.

In Uganda, the Nile has cultural importance as well as economic significance. Many communities along its shores derive their livelihood from fishing its waters. At its point of origin, Uganda has built three hydroelectric dams which provide electricity to many citizens in Uganda and neighboring countries. Uganda plans three other dams further upstream later in the present decade. In Sudan and Egypt, the river is considered to be the 'source of life' as its waters are used for irrigation and the support of agriculture for multitudes of people living along the river since time immemorial.

The Source of the Nile

River Nile forms the border between Njeru in Buikwe District on the west and Jinja, Uganda in Jinja District on the east. At this point, the river flows from Lake Victoria to begin its three-months journey to the Mediterranean Sea. This point, viewed from Njeru, is visited by tourists and holidaymakers for its scenery. The 32 metres (105 ft) deep waterfalls that John Hanning Speke saw in 1862 and named "Ripon Falls" were submerged when construction on Nalubaale Dam began in 1947. The dam was completed in 1954.

== See also ==
- Buikwe
- Central Uganda
- Uganda Districts
- River Nile
- Lake Victoria
- River Sezibwa
