= Kayunga District =

- District
- District location in Uganda
- Coordinates: 01°00′N 32°52′E
- Country: Uganda
- Region: Central Uganda
- Capital: Kayunga

Area
  - Land: 1,587.8 km^{2} (613.1 sq mi)

Population (2012 Estimate)
  - Total: 358,700
  - Density: 225.9/km^{2} (585/sq mi)
- Time zone: UTC+3 (EAT)
- Website: www.kayunga.go.ug

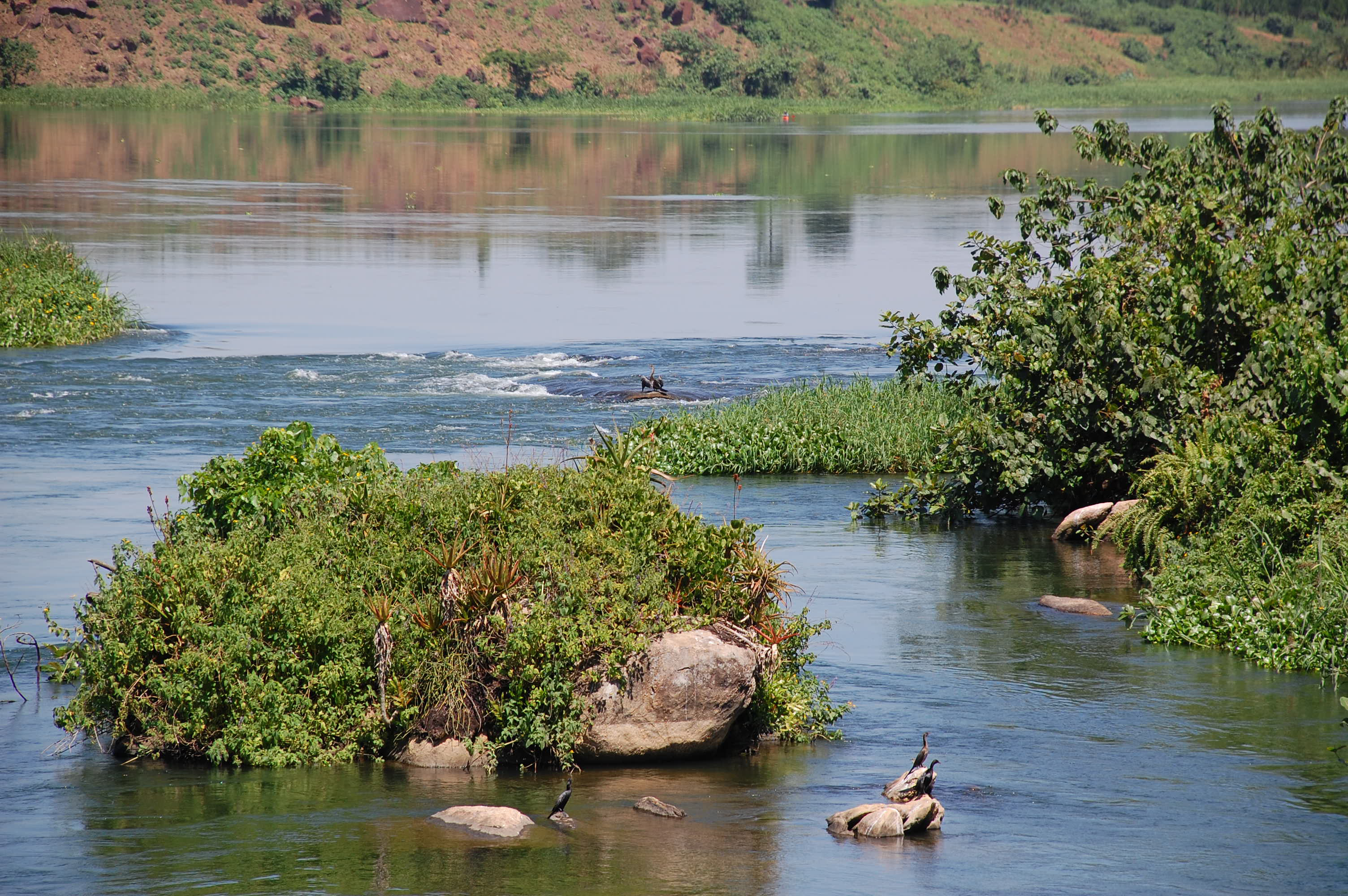
Kalagala-Itanda Offset Falls in Kangulumira, Kayunga District.

Kayunga District is a district in Central Uganda. It is named after its chief town, Kayunga.

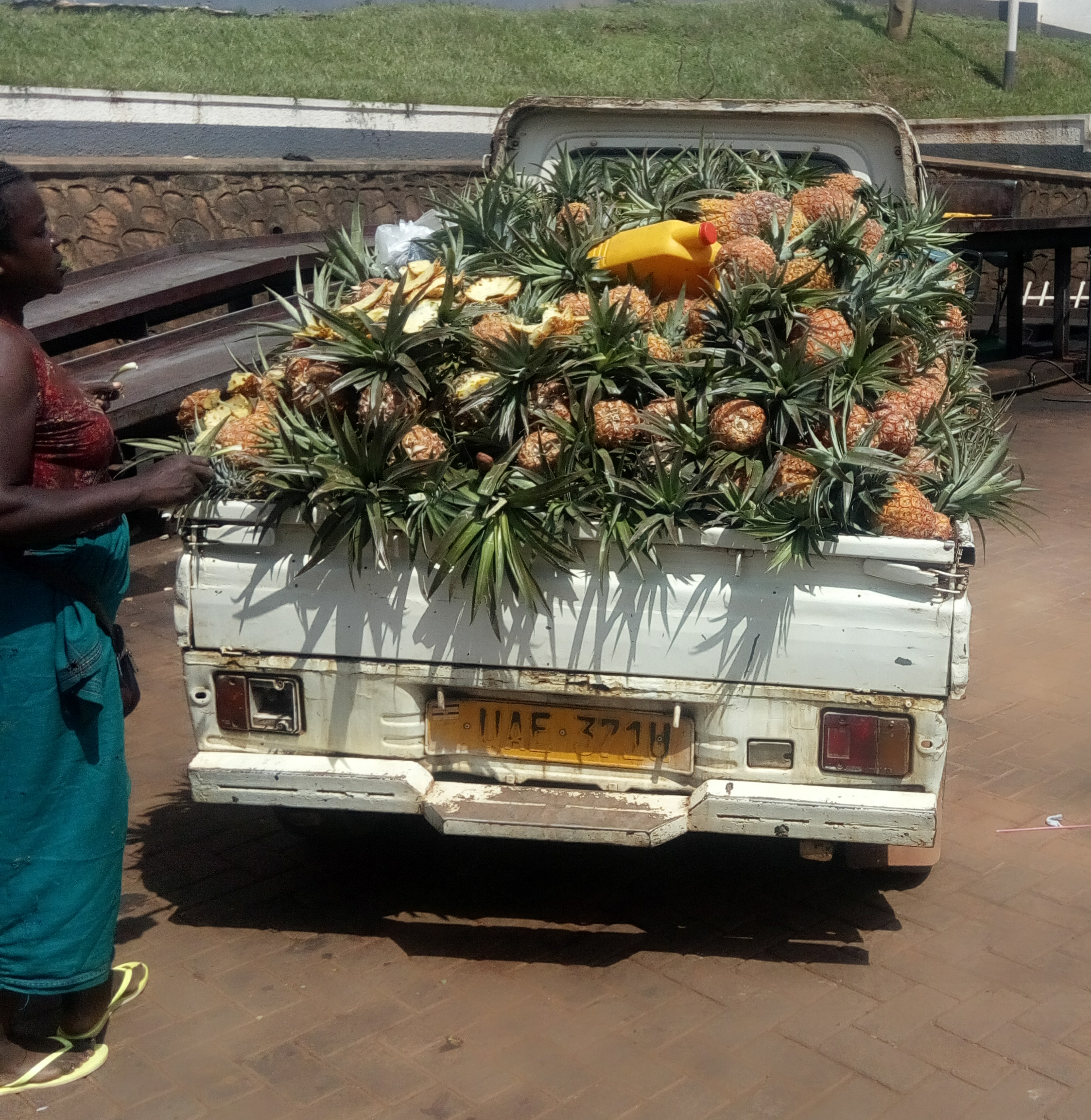
These pineapples are much grown in Bugerere-Kayunga District.

== Geography ==
Kayunga District is bordered by Amolatar District to the north, Buyende District to the northeast, Kamuli District to the east, Jinja District to the southeast, Buikwe District to the south, Mukono District to the southwest, Luweero District to the west, and Nakasongola District to the northwest. District headquarters Kayunga lies approximately 74 kilometres (46 mi) northeast of Kampala, on an all-weather tarmac highway.

== Overview ==
Kayunga District was carved out of Mukono District in December 2000. The district consists of two counties, Bbaale County and Ntenjeru County. It covers 1,587.8 square kilometres (613.1 mi^{2}).

== Population ==
In 2012, the district population was estimated at 358,700, up from 236,200 in 1991 and 294,600 in 2002. According to 2014 National Housing and Population census, the Kayunga population was about 368,064 with 181,920 (49%) males and 186,142 (51%) females. At that time the population density was 231 persons per km^{2}.

Members of over 75% of the tribes of Uganda reside in the district.

== Economic activity ==
Agriculture is the main economic activity and represents 90% of total employment. Kayunga practices animal husbandry and crop husbandry, primarily as subsistence agriculture. Crops include:

- Vanilla
- Cassava
- Matooke
- Pineapples
- Maize
- Millet
- Watermelon
- Passion fruit

About 30% of the arable land of Kayunga district is used for commercial sugar cane, led by the Mehta and Madhvani families.These investors acquired large chunks of land leaving some residents landless. Media covered land wrangles that involve some members of district administration, politicians and locals.

== History ==
In September 2009, Kayunga attempted to secede from the traditional Kingdom of Buganda. The King attempted to visit the district, but was banned by the Ugandan government, provoking riots in Kampala. Thirty people were killed.

== See also ==
- Central Region, Uganda
- Districts of Uganda
