= Umar Kakumba =

- Born: Uganda
- Citizenship: Ugandan
- Education: Makerere University (Bachelor of Arts in Social Sciences) (Diploma in Business Administration) (Masters in Public Administration & Management); University of Pretoria (Doctor of Philosophy in Public Affairs); Wolfson College, Cambridge (Post-doctoral fellowship)
- Occupations: Management Consultant, Academic, Academic Administrator
- Title: Deputy Vice Chancellor for Academic Affairs at Makerere University

Umar Kakumba, is a Ugandan management consultant and academic administrator who, since 15 November 2018, serves as the Deputy Vice Chancellor for Academic Affairs (DVCAA) at Makerere University, Uganda's oldest and largest public university.

== Background and education ==
He was born in Uganda in the 1970s. After attending local primary and secondary schools, he was admitted to Makerere University, graduating with a Bachelor of Arts degree in Social Sciences. He followed that with a Diploma in Business Administration and a Masters in Public Administration & Management, all from Makerere University.

His Doctor of Philosophy in Public Affairs degree was awarded by the University of Pretoria in South Africa. In 2014, he completed a post-doctoral fellowship at Wolfson College, Cambridge, in the United Kingdom.

== Work experience ==
Kakumba has spent most of his academic career at the School of Business, in the College of Business and Management (CoBAMS), of Makerere University. At the time he was appointed Deputy Vice Chancellor, he had risen to the rank of Associate Professor and Dean of the School of Business. On 2nd August 2024, he handed over the office as the DVCAA to Bunyiza Mukadasi, the academic registrar at that time.

== Scholarly work ==
As of March 2026, he has been featured in many publications.

=== Journal articles ===
- Enhancing public–private partnership operating environment for tourism development in Uganda.
- Optimizing public–private partnerships in Uganda’s tourism sector: critical success factors and best practices for sustainable project outcomes.
- Gendered Participation in Water Governance: Implications for Successful Communitybased Water Management and Women Empowerment.
- Perceptions of Youths on Government Venture Capital Fund (The Accrued Empowerment Benefits).
- Assessing the Institutional Capacity of External Agencies in Holding Local Government Accountable in Uganda.
- Assessing the Institutional Capacity of External Agencies in Holding Local Government Accountable in Uganda.
- Local government citizen participation and rural development: Reflections on Uganda's decentralization system

== See also ==
- John Ddumba Ssentamu
- William Bazeyo
- Sylvia Tamale
- John Ruganda
