= Aidan Southall =

British cultural anthropologist

Aidan William Southall
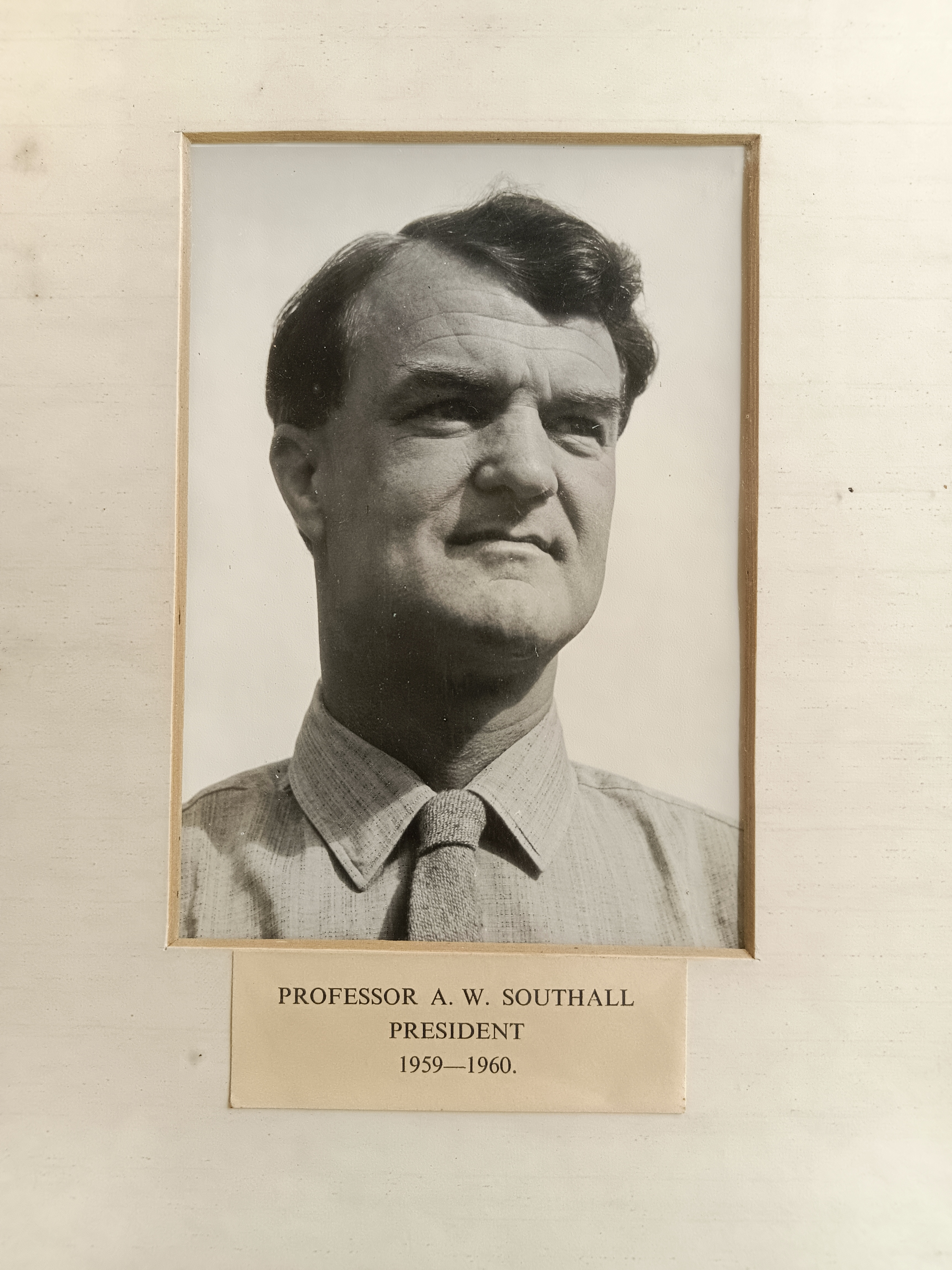
- Born: 11 September 1920; Warwickshire, England
- Died: 17 May 2009 (aged 88); France
- Education: Perse School, Cambridge Cambridge University University of London
- Occupation: Cultural anthropologist
- Employer(s): Makerere University; University of Wisconsin, Madison
- Notable work: Alur Society: A Study in Processes and Types of Domination
- Title: President of The Uganda Society
- Term: 1959 - 1960
- Predecessor: Dr. H.F Morris
- Successor: Mr. J.C.D Lawrance
- Spouse(s): Betty Stogdon (1945 - 1966) Isis Ragheb (1966 - 1973) Christine Obbo

Aidan William Southall (11 September 1920 – 17 May 2009) was a British cultural anthropologist recognised for his fieldwork in urban settings in post-war Africa. Often identified as a pioneer in the study of African cities, Southall is said to have played a significant role in the development of urban anthropology. In 2009, Aidan Southall died. He was married to Betty Stogdon (1945-1966), Isis Ragheb (1966-1973) and Christine Obbo who survived him together with his children with Betty: daughter Lucinda; and son Mark and his wife Madeline with their children Christopher, Catherine and Andrew.

== Early life and education ==
Southall, the son of a Church of England parson, was born in Warwickshire, England. Having been born into an impoverished family, Southall was unable to attend boarding school with his friends. He attended a preparatory school, The Perse School in Cambridge, England, at the age of 8 years old. At the age of 11, Southall began his secondary education and eventually worked his way up to Cambridge University where he initially studied classics. During his last year at Cambridge, at the age of 18, Southall had the opportunity to travel to Jamaica—his first exotic experience. Shortly after this, Southall switched over to anthropology after having been persuaded by one of his professors. At Cambridge University, he gained his bachelor's degree in social and cultural anthropology. After graduating in 1942, Southall followed his colleagues to Uganda with the interest of pursuing social anthropology as a career. He eventually attended the University of London where he gained his PhD.

== Career ==
Southall was given the opportunity to apply for a position at Makerere University in Uganda, and in 1945 he became a professor of social studies at this institution. He had the opportunity to carry out research in that particular area among others in Africa, and eventually conducted fieldwork in Nyanza with a Luo student in Kenya. In Karachuonyo, South Nyanza, being restricted to a short-term study over the span of his vacation, Southall found it difficult to conduct long-term fieldwork and therefore focused on food and lineages. While researching the Luo People, Southall made a short visit to Alur, which became one of his most significant life changing experiences from which he published his first written work called Alur Society. He returned to Alur in 1948 and spent two years there conducting doctoral fieldwork. In the 1950s, Southall became more interested in urban anthropology, and some his work focused on the complexity of developing urban areas. Unlike most anthropologists of his time, Southall was generally interested in urbanisation and the development of African cities in particular.

After completing his PhD in 1952 in London, he returned to Makerere as a member of East African Institute of Social Research. During his years at Makerere, he obtained a UNESCO fellowship which slowly contributed to the expansion of his notability and connection through a visit to the United States. There, he encountered other influential researchers, including sociologist Talcott Parsons, who influenced Southall in developing an appreciation for Max Weber's work. As it reflected in his publications, there was a gradual shift in Southall's theoretical position as he began adopting more Marxist views.

Southall became professor of Sociology and Social Anthropology a department he designed from the Social Studies courses, was Social Sciences Faculty Dean (1963-4), and Chairman of the East African Institute of Social Research (1957–64) at Makarere University college which became part of the University of East Africa in 1963 and independent in 1970. He taught briefly at the University of Chicago and University of California, before moving to Syracuse University (1964-69). From 1969 to 1991 he was at the University of Wisconsin-Madison with periodic teaching and research breaks at Makerere University, University of Cape Town and Semester at Sea. He became professor emeritus in 1990.

His extensive fieldwork and research, enabled Southall to become fluent in French, East Africa western Nilotic languages and several Bantu languages of Uganda and the trade language Kiswahili widely used in The Congo, Kenya, and Tanzania (where it was adopted as the national language).

He was a founder member of the East African Academy, and served as 27th president of The Uganda Society and editor its journal (1959-1960).

His association memberships included: the Royal Anthropological Institute of Great Britain and Ireland, the International African Institute, the American Anthropological Association, the Association of Social Anthropologist of the Commonwealth, the African Studies Association (UK), the International Commission of Urban Anthropology and served on the editorial board of Urban Anthropology journal, and the African Studies Association (USA) serving as Board of Director member and President. He was a member of the editorial boards of the Journal of Colonial HIstory (1992-2000).

== Work ==
For his doctoral dissertation, Aidan Southall wrote Alur Society: A Study in Processes and Types of Domination (1956), which dealt with political structures among the Alur people of Northwest Uganda. He carried out anthropological fieldwork among the Alur people for approximately two years between 1949 and 1952. Southall described a continuous process of political and cultural domination, done almost entirely without the use of force.

His next publication was Townsmen in the Making: Kampala and its Suburbs (1957), featuring two specific reports that were developed as part of a general study of African life in greater Kampala, Uganda. Examining such issues as land, housing, economic activity, and marriage, Southall drew upon the survey results for specific information while also supplementing quantitative data with qualitative material and anecdotes.

As Aidan Southall grew more experienced in observing urban systems, he released Social Change in Modern Africa (1961), which contained the proceedings of the First International African Institute Seminar at Makarere, a Kampala school where he taught. This seminar and publication speculated about how complex social systems should be studied.

"The Illusion of the Tribe" was published in 1970 in The Passing of Tribal Man, edited by P.C.W. Gutkind, and reprinted in 2010 in Perspectives on Africa: A Reader in Culture, History, and Representation.

Southall later published a collection of papers, originally presented at the Wenner-Gren seminar of 1964, about cross cultural similarities in the urbanisation process. This collection of papers was titled Urban Anthropology: Cross Cultural Studies of Urbanization (1973) and attempted to identify and characterise significant issues in urban anthropology.

Later that decade, Southall published a collection of essays entitled Small Urban Centers in Rural Development in Africa (1979). His essays are broken down in different categories, the first of which represented the social and anthropological perspective. Other essays took historical or political viewpoints, followed by economic case studies, and finished with an argument about whether their findings are conceptual or theoretical in nature.

Southall coedited with Peter j. M. Nas and Ghaus Ansar City and Society: Studies in Urban Ethnicity, Life- style and Class in 1985. Papers expressed the diversity, hetergeneity and vitality of urban research.

In 1986 with Conrad Philip Kottak, Jean-Aimé Rakotoarisoa and Pierre Vérin, southall coedited Madagascar: Society and History. It was a collection of sympsium papers on Human Adjustment in Time and Space in Madagascar supported by the Wenner-Gren Foundation for Anthropological Research.

Aidan Southall's next big published work, in conjunction with Greg Gulin, was entitled Urban Anthropology in China (1993). This text originated at the First International Urban Anthropology Conference in China in December 1989, after being postponed and put on hold many times. This collection of essays involves Chinese urban ethnicity, finished off by Chinese urban culture and life cycles.

His final book was The City in Time and Space (2000), written about cities on a grand scale. Having studied urbanisation his entire life, this book was an overview of what he believed the life process to encompass. The book starts off as a survey of implications, varying across time and space, of demographic, social, cultural, political, and economic concentration for society as a whole.

According to social anthropologist Ray Abrahams:

Despite the range and undoubted importance of so many of his works, Aidan's impact on his fellow anthropologists was more diffuse than that of some more prominent British figures, partly because he worked outside the boundaries of major "schools" in Cambridge, Manchester and Oxford. The Marxist theoretical position he adopted became less fashionable, and the grand scope of his last book was almost "an impossible act to follow".
