= Wasswa =

Wasswa is both a surname and a given name. Notable people with the name include:

- Brian Wasswa, Ugandan activist
- Denis Ssebuggwawo Wasswa (1870–1886), Ugandan Catholic martyr and saint
- Hassan Wasswa (born 1988), Ugandan footballer
- Herman Wasswa (born 1993), Ugandan footballer
- Wasswa Serwanga (born 1976), American football player
- William Wasswa (born 1988), Ugandan physician, academician, and a medical researcher
