= Fred Enanga =

Ugandan police officer

SCP Fred Enanga
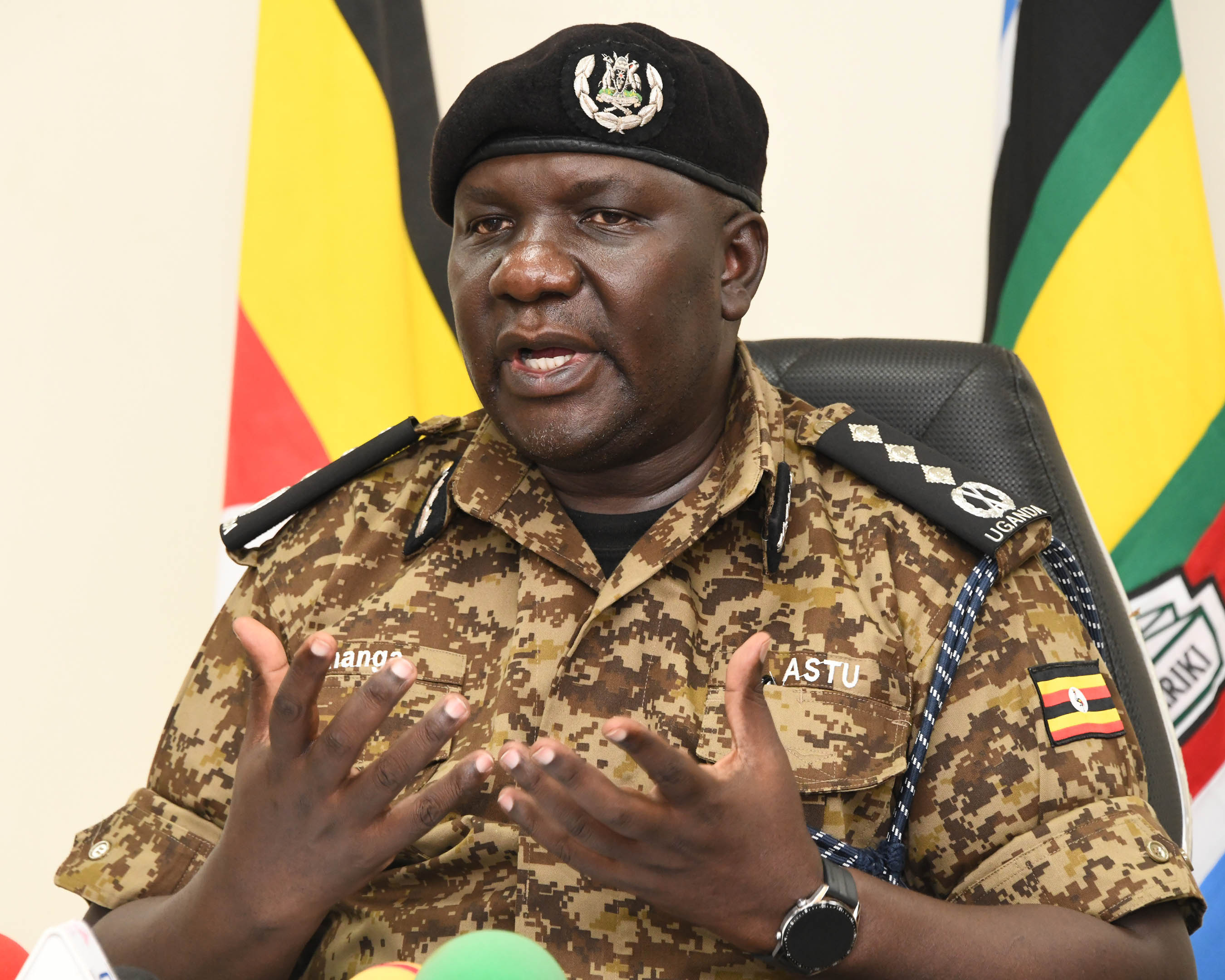
- Enanga in Uganda Police Force uniform

Deputy Director of Interpol and International Relations, Uganda Police Force
- Incumbent
- Assumed office July 2024
- President: Yoweri Museveni

Spokesperson of the Uganda Police Force
- In office 2019 – June 2024
- Preceded by: Emilian Kayima
- Succeeded by: Kituuma Rusoke

Spokesperson of the Uganda Police Force
- In office 2014–2016
- Preceded by: Judith Nabakooba
- Succeeded by: Emilian Kayima

Personal details
- Born: June 23, 1973 (age 53) Kampala, Uganda
- Citizenship: Ugandan
- Education: Makerere University
- Occupation: Police officer, public servant, economist
- Awards: Golden Jubilee Medal (2022)

Fred Enanga ( born June 23, 1973 ) is a Ugandan police officer, civil servant, and economist. He served as Police Spokesperson, Senior Commissioner of Police (SCP) and currently serves as deputy director of Interpol and International Relations for the Uganda Police Force.

== Early life and education ==
Enanga was born on June 23, 1973, to George Echonga who was also a police officer and Christine Echonga. He grew up in Kampala alongside his parents and nine siblings. His ancestral roots trace back to Ayago village, Akokoro sub-county in the Apac District of Northern Uganda, and Luo by ethnicity.

Enanga started his education from Peter Piper Nursery School, Mugwanya Preparatory School then St Savio from where he completed his primary education. He then joined Lango College, Kololo SSS and Kitante Hill from where he completed his secondary education. He then joined Makerere University from where he graduated with a bachelor's degree in Social Sciences majoring in economics. In 2022, he was promoted to the senior commissioner of police rank.

== Career ==
Enanga joined the Uganda Police Force in 2001 as a cadet officer and underwent training at the Police Training School in Kibuli, Kampala. After two years, he was promoted to the rank of Assistant Superintendent of Police (ASP). His early deployments included serving as the Officer in Charge (OC) of Operations in Entebbe (2002) and a brief stint as OC CID in Nateete.

He also severed as CID officer for Ssembabule district and Lira municipality before being transferred to CID headquarters as a staff officer. In 2018, Enanga was made the Ugandan police's spokesperson, a position he served in twice (2014–2016, 2019–2024).

In 2024, Enanga was appointed deputy director of Interpol-Uganda working under Assistant Inspector General of Police (AIGP) Grace Akullo.

== Awards ==
In June 2022, Enanga was decorated with the prestigious Golden Jubilee Medal by President Museveni during the Heroes Day celebrations.

== See also ==
- Uganda Police Force
- Interpol
- Judith Nabakooba
- Kale Kayihura
- Kituuma Rusoke
- Ministry of Internal Affairs (Uganda)
