= William Bazeyo =

Ugandan physician, public health consultant and academic (born 1957)

Professor William Bazeyo
- Born: 1957 (age 68–69); Uganda
- Education: Makerere University School of Medicine (Bachelor of Medicine and Bachelor of Surgery); Yong Loo Lin School of Medicine at the National University of Singapore (Master of Medicine in Occupational Health); Atlantic International University (Doctor of Public Health); Tufts University (Doctor of Science-Honorary)
- Occupations: Physician; public health specialist; researcher; academic administrator
- Years active: Since 1992
- Known for: Academics, research, and leadership
- Title: Professor of Public Health & Deputy Vice Chancellor for Finance and Administration at Makerere University
- Spouse: (Alice Bazeyo d. 8 January 2019)

William Bazeyo is a Ugandan physician, public health specialist, academic, researcher, and academic administrator. From September 2017 until October 2020, he was the deputy vice chancellor in charge of finance and administration at Makerere University. During the preceding eight years, he was the dean of the Makerere University School of Public Health.

== Background and education ==
Bazeyo was born in Uganda circa 1957. After attending local schools, he attended and graduated from the Makerere University School of Medicine with Bachelor of Medicine and Bachelor of Surgery degrees. He then earned a Master of Medicine in occupational health from the Yong Loo Lin School of Medicine at the National University of Singapore. Later, in 2014, he graduated with a Doctor of Public Health degree from Atlantic International University. Atlantic International University has been characterized as a degree mill, and its degrees have been widely dismissed as "fake."

== Career ==
Bazeyo has been active in general practice and public health for two decades. He was a principal actor in the formation in 2005 of the Higher Education Alliance for Leadership Training for Health, which brings together seven schools of public health in six countries. He also serves as the director of the Centre for Tobacco Control in Africa, which supports government efforts to build and sustain the capacity to regulate tobacco in Africa.

In addition to his university assignments, Bazeyo serves as the chief-of-party at the ResilientAfrica Network, which is composed of 20 universities in 16 African countries and whose mission is to strengthen the resilience of communities through education and innovative technologies and approaches.

== Research ==
Besides his administrative work at the university, he has been involved in several research studies which have been published in peer reviewed journals. Some of these publications include; Prevalence, knowledge and practices of shisha smoking among youth in Kampala City, Uganda. This study found a high prevalence of shisha smoking among the youth with three in ten youths smoking shisha yet their knowledge about the health effects associated with shisha smoking was low. Operationalizing the one health approach in Uganda: challenges and opportunities. Reflecting on one Health in action during the COVID-19 response. Lessons from a community based interdisciplinary learning exposure: benefits for both students and communities in Uganda. The study established that through the OHI, students gained One Health competencies including communication, teamwork, and collaboration. Adherence to anti diabetic medication among patients with diabetes in eastern Uganda; a cross sectional study. It was found that about four in five patients adhere to anti-diabetic treatment. Characteristics and outcomes of admitted patients infected with SARS-CoV-2 in Uganda. This article discovered that most of the patients with COVID-19 presented with mild disease and exhibited a clinical trajectory not similar to other countries. Efficacy of convalescent plasma for treatment of COVID-19 in Uganda. Lowland grazing and Marburg virus disease (MVD) outbreak in Kween district, Eastern Uganda. The study concluded that there is need to integrate One Health concepts within agricultural extension service provision in Uganda so as to enhance the management of such infectious diseases. Building capacity for HIV/AIDS program leadership and management in Uganda through mentored Fellowships. Strengthening health workforce capacity through work-based training. An exploration of caregiver burden for children with nodding syndrome (lucluc) in Northern Uganda. Coping strategies for landslide and flood disasters: A qualitative study of Mt. Elgon region, Uganda. Ebola a reality of modern Public Health; need for Surveillance, Preparedness and Response Training for Health Workers and other multidisciplinary teams: a case for Uganda. and Employment status of AFROHUN-Uganda one health alumni, and facilitators and barriers to application of the one health approach: a tracer study.

== Recognition ==
In April 2021, Professor Bazeyo was awarded an honorary Doctor of Science degree by Tufts University, in recognition of his body of work, specifically his efforts to promote cessation of smoking among humans.

== See also ==
- Umar Kakumba
- Barnabas Nawangwe
