= Uganda Martyrs' Hospital Ibanda =

Community hospital in Uganda

Uganda Martyrs’ Hospital Ibanda
- Uganda Catholic Medical Bureau

Geography
- Location: Ibanda, Ibanda District, Western Region, Uganda
- Coordinates: 00°07′47″S 30°26′55″E

Organisation
- Care system: Public
- Type: General

Services
- Emergency department: I
- Beds: 178

History
- Founded: 1968

Links
- Other links: Hospitals in Uganda; Medical education in Uganda

Uganda Martyrs' Hospital Ibanda, is a non-profit, community hospital, in the town of Ibanda, in the Western Region of Uganda. It is affiliated with the Roman Catholic Archdiocese of Mbarara and is accredited by the Uganda Catholic Medical Bureau.

== Location ==
The hospital is located west of the municipality of Ibanda, about 9 kilometres (6 mi) from the central business district of the town. This is approximately 73 kilometres (45 mi) northwest of Mbarara Regional Referral Hospital, in the city of Mbarara.

Uganda Martyrs' Hospital Ibanda is located about 115 kilometres (71 mi) southeast of Fort Portal Regional Referral Hospital, in the city of Fort Portal. The geographical coordinates of Uganda Martyrs’ Hospital Ibanda are: 0°07'47.0"S, 30°26'55.0"E (Latitude:-0.129722; Longitude:30.448611).

== Overview ==
Uganda Martyrs' Hospital Ibanda is a Roman Catholic, faith-based community hospital that serves patients in Ibanda District and surrounding communities. A small payment is expected at the time of service, although no one is turned away, because of lack of money. The hospital was established in 1968. It has a bed capacity of 178.

== Hospital operations ==
As of December 2019, the hospital attended to 19,097 outpatients annually, on average. At the same time, 14,715 inpatients were admitted every year, on average, with a bed occupancy ratio of 58.2 percent. The annual maternal deliveries at the hospital averaged 2,663, with a caesarian section rate of 30.62 percent. Patient user fees accounted for 68.1 percent of annual hospital income.

== Other considerations ==
The hospital owns, manages and maintains Uganda Martyrs' Nurses' and Midwifery Training School Ibanda. The school which was established in 1995, admits between 60 and 70 students annually.

== See also ==
- List of hospitals in Uganda
