= Ssentamu =

Ssentamu is a surname. Notable people with the surname include:

- John Ddumba Ssentamu (born 1953), Ugandan economist, academic, and banker
- Robert Kyagulanyi Ssentamu (born 1982), also known as Bobi Wine, Ugandan politician, singer, actor, and businessman
- Ssentamu Churchill James, a Ugandan Youth Leader
