= Ibanda University =

Private university in Uganda

Ibanda University (IU)
- Motto: Hard Work for Excellence
- Type: Private
- Established: 2014
- Chancellor: Venansius Baryamureeba
- Vice-Chancellor: Samson James Opolot
- Administrative staff: 60+ (2022)
- Students: 3000+
- Location: Ibanda, Ibanda District, Uganda; 00°07′24″S 30°29′54″E
- Campus: Ibanda Main Campus, Directorate of Graduate Studies
- Website: ibandauniversity.ac.ug
- Location in Uganda

Ibanda University (IU) is a private, co-educational Ugandan university in the Western Region of Uganda.

== Location ==
The campus of the university is located in Bubaare Cell, Bufunda Ward, Bufunda Division in the Municipality of Ibanda (pop.31,316), in Ibanda District, Western Uganda. This is approximately 72 kilometres (45 mi), by road, north of Mbarara, the largest city in the sub-region. Ibanda University is approximately 308 kilometres (191 mi), by road, southwest of Kampala, the largest city and capital of Uganda. The geographical coordinates of the campus of Ibanda University are:0°07'24.0"S, 30°29'54.0"E (Latitude:-0.123333; Longitude:30.498333).

== Overview ==
The university was established in 2014 by private Ugandan individuals. It is accredited by the Uganda National Council for Higher Education. It is a co-educational institution that offers certificate, diploma, bachelors, postgraduate diploma and masters degree courses.

The highest supervisory body of the university is the board of trustees. Below the board is the university council. Below the council, is the university senate. The day-to-day activities of the university are supervised by the vice chancellor, assisted by the university secretary, the university bursar, the academic registrar and the deans of schools of the university. Currently, the chairman of the board of trustees is Jeeb Rwomushana, the university chancellor is Venansius Baryamureeba and the vice-chancellor is Professor Samson James Opolot.

== See also ==
- Education in Uganda
- List of universities in Uganda
