= Christine Obbo =

Ugandan socio-cultural anthropologist

- Born: 1947 (age 78–79)
- Education: Makerere University; University of Wisconsin
- Occupation: socio-cultural anthropologist
- Known for: politics
- Spouse: Aidan Southall (died 2009)

Christine Obbo (born in 1947) is an Ugandan socio-cultural anthropologist. She attended school at Makerere University in Uganda, earning her BA and MA there and went on to receive a doctorate at the University of Wisconsin, with a scholarship from Rockefeller Foundation. She was then a professor at Wheaton College and then Wayne State University, later becoming involved in activities with HIV/AIDS, gender, and policy issues.

== Career ==
As an anthropologist, Obbo focuses on Ugandan ethnography. She is the author of the book African Women. Later, she focuses on investigating both social and cultural impacts of African HIV/AIDS crisis as she is interested in examining the links between economic system and sex-gender dynamic in Uganda and how it could slow the spread of HIV in Uganda socially. Many of her work can be dated back to 1980s and Obbo is still active in early 2000. She had contributed her expertise in many areas, including but not limited to participating in various UN-sponsored conferences to highlight the social issues of HIV/AIDS in Uganda to the international community, as well as writing for CODESRIA (Council for the Development of Social Science Research in Africa) publication.

== Personal life ==
In 1975 Obbo married anthropologist Aidan Southall. He died in 2009 at their home in France.

== Publications ==
1. Obbo, Christine (2022). Freedom of One's Feet: A Passion for Journeying. iUniverse. ISBN 978-1-6632-3843-6.
2. Obbo, Christine (2020). Personal Educational Strivings and Accommodations in pre and Colonial Uganda. Trenton: Africa World Press. ISBN 978-1-56902-672-4.
3. Obbo, Christine (2019). The Inexorable Weeping. Christine Obbo. ISBN 979-8-2151-7632-0.
4. Obbo, Christine (1981). African Women: Their Struggle for Economic Independence. London: Zed Press. ISBN 978-0-905762-48-7.
