= Aloikin Praise Opoloje =

Ugandan human rights activist (born 1999)

- Born: 1999 (age 26–27); Kampala, Uganda
- Education: Makerere University
- Occupation: Human rights activist
- Years active: 2024–present
- Organization: WeThePeople
- Known for: Protesting against corruption in Uganda

Aloikin Praise Opoloje (born 1999) is a Ugandan human rights activist. She became known in 2024 for leading a series of protests against corruption in Uganda, for which she was arrested and detained on three separate occasions. In 2025, Opoloje received the European Union Human Rights Defenders' Award in recognition of her activism, and was a finalist for the Martin Ennals Award for Human Rights Defenders.

== Biography ==
Opoloje was born and raised in Paliisa, a district in Eastern Uganda. She later said her inspiration to become an activist was based on growing up in Paliisa, where she could see the impacts of state corruption, including failing health and education institutions. In 2023, while studying law at Makerere University, Opoloje almost died while giving birth to her daughter; the ward was crowded and understaffed, and Opoloje's mother was forced to pay a 5000 UGX bribe in order for Opoloje to receive life-saving sutures.

Opoloje subsequently began posting videos on social media in which she discussed corruption, most notably on X. She created WeThePeople, a community group that aimed to inform young Ugandans of their civil rights, as well as about non-violent resistance.

On 23 July 2024, Opoloje organised the March on Parliament, an anti-corruption protest that called for the resignation of Anita Among, the Speaker of the Parliament of Uganda, due to allegations of corruption and misuse of public funds. Planned to march through central Kampala to the Ugandan parliament, protesters were quickly stopped and arrested by police. Opoloje was detained until early August at Luzira Maximum Security Prison; during this time, she reported being sexually and physically assaulted by police officers.

Shortly after Opoloje's release from prison, a landslide occurred at the Kiteezi Landfill, causing 35 deaths and destroying hundreds of homes. Inspired by traditional African cursing ceremonies, Opoloje and two other activists decided to organise the Nude Protest to Parliament, during which they would march naked except for a covering over their genitals, with "no corruption" painted on their bodies. The protest was held on 2 September 2024; Opoloje and her two fellow marches were quickly arrested and detained at Luzira for 10 days before being granted bail by Buganda Road Magistrates Court.

Opoloje has since arranged other marches, including the March to the Supreme Court to protest the use of court-martials to trial civilians, primarily political dissidents and human rights activists. As of 2025, Opoloje has been arrested and detained three times, and has three separate ongoing court proceedings against her. Critics of Opoloje have accused her of "misusing" the female body, "attention-seeking" and of being funded by "foreign countries", as was alleged by the President of Uganda, Yoweri Museveni.

In September 2026, Opoloje was arrested following viral videos on TikTok in which she referred to Chief of Defence Forces General Muhoozi Kainerugaba as a "cabbage". When brought before the Buganda Road Chief Magistrate's Court, she was formally charged with unlawfully using a mobile phone SIM card registered in her mother's name. Human rights defenders criticized the charge as a pretext for political persecution. She pleaded not guilty and was remanded to Luzira Prison.

On 14 October 2026, Opoloje was released after posting a 500, 000 UGX bail. She was also prohibited from leaving Uganda without permission of the court.

== Recognition ==
Opoloje won the 2025 EU Human Rights Defenders' Award in recognition of "her courageous activism for civil liberties, accountability, social justice and anti-corruption in Uganda". That same year, she was a finalist for the Martin Ennals Award for Human Rights Defenders, ultimately placing as runner-up to Brazilian activist Ana Paula Gomes de Oliveira.
