= Katherine Namuddu =

Ugandan educationist and author

- Citizenship: Uganda
- Education: Makerere University
- Occupation: Author
- Known for: Working with RockFeller Foundation
- Title: Dr
- Awards: Women of Distinction Award.
- Honours: Legacy of Leadership Award

Katherine Namuddu is a Ugandan educationist, academician, researcher, author and advisor on African higher education who worked with the Rockefeller Foundation of New York and Makerere University.

== Career ==
She taught at Nairobi, Kenyatta and Makerere University where she was deputy chair of the University Council. She worked for the Rockefeller Foundation of New York and an advisor on African higher education. She is one of the founding members of Diaspora Girls' Senior High School and she was the Director of Studies at Uganda Martyrs SS Namugongo.She was awarded with the Women of Distinction Award by Forum for African Women Educationalists(FAWE) for helping and inspiring the girl-child.She was also honored by Makerere University when it was honoring its former leaders at the event titled "A Legacy of Leadership".

She has published a number of articles which include; Systemic Curricular Change, Strengthening Educational Research in Developing Countries, Educational research priorities in Sub-Saharan Africa among others which are intended to promote the quality of education in higher institutions. She has also published books like Her Husband's Crown and Never a Dull Moment which narrates the barriers of modern schools in a rural village in Uganda to a girl child.

== Publications ==
- Systemic Curricular Change.
- Strengthening Educational Research in Developing Countries.
- Educational research priorities in Sub-Saharan Africa.
- Educational research priorities in Sub-Saharan Africa

== Books ==
- Never a Dull Moment: 1950S Village Schooling in Uganda.
- Her Husband's Crown.

== Awards ==
- Women of Distinction Award.
- Legacy of Leadership Award

== See also ==
- Joy Kwesiga
- Miria Matembe
