= Jones Kyazze =

Ugandan retired international civil servant and author

Dr Jones Yosiya Kyazze PHF
- Yosiya Kyazze
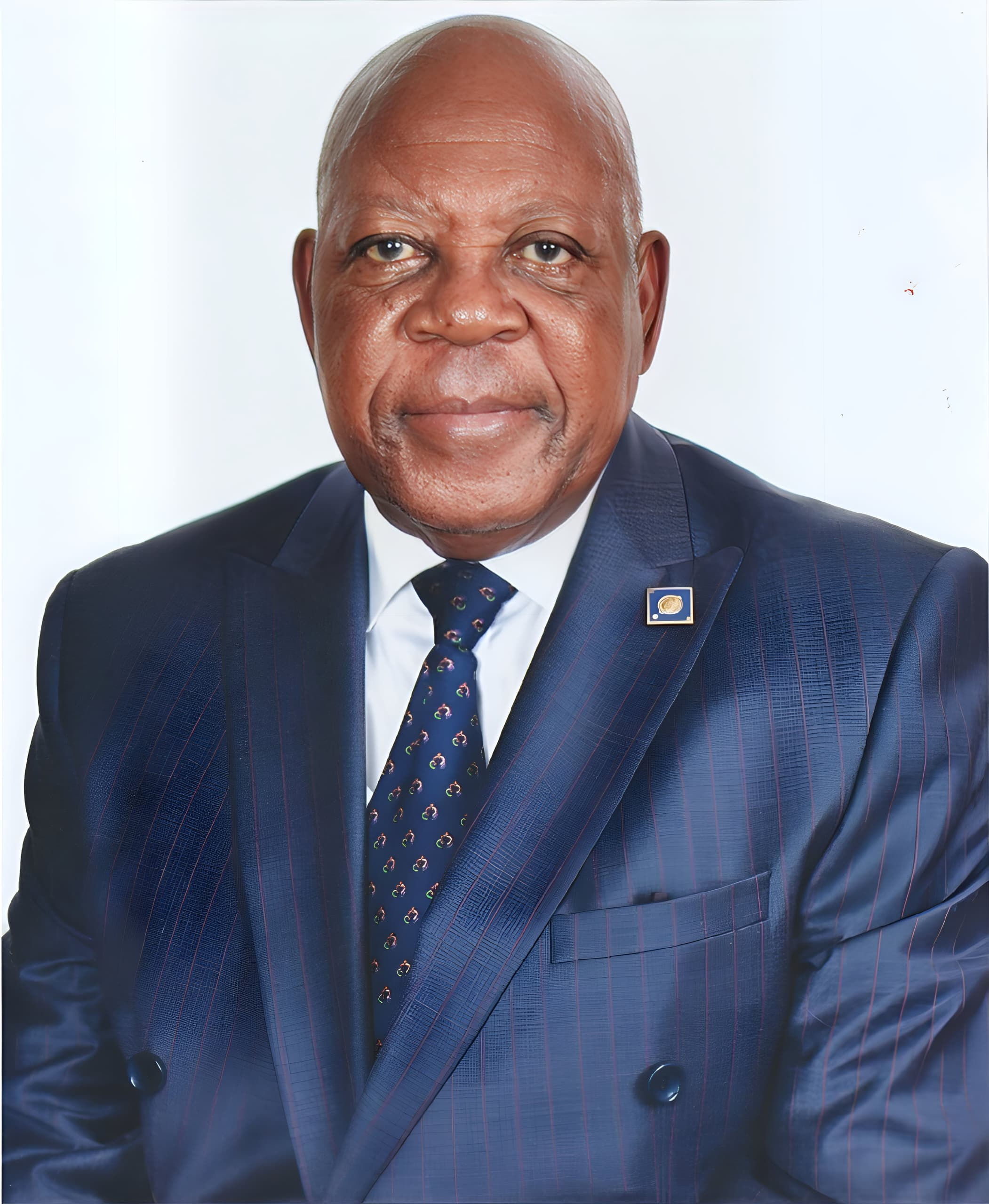
- Jones Kyazze in 2022
- Born: 4 November 1943 (age 82); Uganda
- Other name: Jones Kyazze
- Citizenship: Uganda
- Education: Makerere University; University of London; University of Sussex; University of Besançon
- Occupation: International civil servant
- Years active: 1970–Present
- Employer: UNESCO (1972–2003)
- Title: Director of the UNESCO

Jones Yosiya Kyazze, also known as Jones Kyazze, is a Ugandan retired international civil servant, author, and Rotarian. He has also worked in the fields of culture and heritage, and served as a minister in the Buganda government. He worked for the United Nations Educational, Scientific and Cultural Organization (UNESCO), holding several senior positions, including Director of the UNESCO Liaison Office in New York City and UNESCO Representative to the United Nations. According to the Lobid Organization, he spent 32 years working for UNESCO before joining the Buganda Government as Minister for Tourism and Wildlife.He also served as UNESCO's Representative to the United Nations.

In January 2005, he was appointed by the Kabaka as Minister of State for Heritage, Royal Tombs and Tourism in the Buganda Government.

Kyazze has written on education, international public service, culture, love and fiction. His publications include the Making of an International Civil Servant: My Incredible Journey and Omutuba Ndogoobukaba n'omukululo gwagwo, a Luganda-language book about the history and genealogy of the Ndogoobukaba sub-clan, among others.

== Early life and education ==
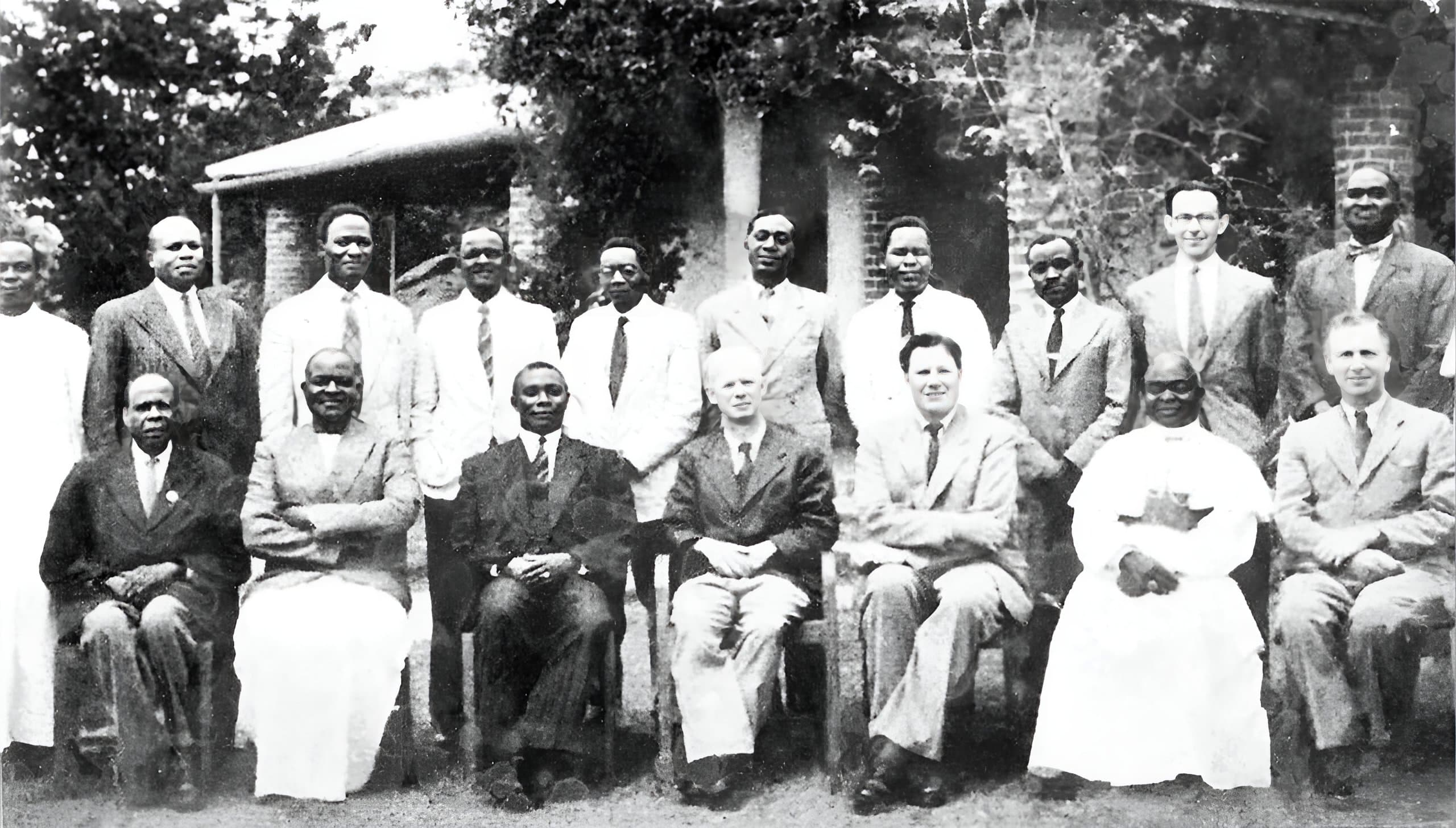
Delegates to the 1954 Namirembe Conference pose for a group Photograph in Kampala, Uganda. Yosia Kyazze is Pictured at far left, while Sir Keith Hancock, chair of the conference is pictured at the far right.

Jones Yosiya Kyazze was born on 4 November 1943 at Mulago Hospital in Kampala, Uganda. He grew up in Nateete, near Mengo, in an extended family compound shared by his father, Yake Yekoniya Siki Musoke Kyazze, and his grandfather, Yosiya Kyazze. His grandfather served as Minister of Finance in the Buganda Government during the reigns of Kabaka Daudi Chwa and Kabaka Edward Muteesa II, and later acted as Muteesa II's guardian while the Kabaka studied at the University of Cambridge in the United Kingdom. He also participated in the 1954 Namirembe Conference, chaired by Professor Keith Hancock, whose discussions contributed to the 1955 Buganda Agreement and the return of Muteesa II from exile. Kyazze's father later served as Speaker of the Buganda Lukiiko.

Kyazze began his education in Nateete before transferring to Aggrey Memorial School. He later attended Makerere College School for his junior secondary education and Old Kampala Senior Secondary School, where he completed his secondary education from Senior One to Senior Six. During his school years, he took part in student leadership, scouting, athletics, boxing, and drama. He served as both head prefect and sports captain.

After completing secondary school, Kyazze briefly enrolled at the University of Dar es Salaam to study law, but left after a short period. He later joined Makerere University, then part of the University of East Africa, where he studied history and French. He graduated with distinction in French and received a scholarship to pursue postgraduate studies in France.

He subsequently studied at the University of Besançon in France, where he obtained a Licence-ès-Lettres. He later earned a postgraduate diploma in education from the University of London and a doctorate from the University of Sussex.

== Career ==
Kyazze joined the United Nations Educational, Scientific and Cultural Organization (UNESCO) in 1972 through its Young Professionals Programme. He began his career in the Education Sector at UNESCO Headquarters.

In 1979, he was posted to the UNESCO Regional Office for Education in Dakar, Senegal, where he worked until 1988.

He later worked on a joint UNDP–UNESCO education project in Sierra Leone. From 1992 to 1995, he served at the UNESCO Office in Lagos, Nigeria, first as Education Adviser and, from 1994, as Head of Office and UNESCO Representative.

From June 1996, Kyazze worked in UNESCO's Priority Africa Department, where he was responsible for relations with member states. Between July and December 1998, he also served as Acting Director of the department. In 1999, he was appointed Director of the Africa Section in UNESCO's Bureau of External Relations. In April 2001, he became Director of the UNESCO Liaison Office in New York.

As Director of the Liaison Office, Kyazze represented UNESCO at the United Nations, where he spoke on issues including the United Nations Literacy Decade, Education for All, adult education, universal primary education, lifelong learning, and international cooperation in education and literacy programmes.

A 2002 United Nations press release states that Kyazze addressed the Third Committee of the United Nations General Assembly on behalf of UNESCO. During his career with the organization, he worked across 54 African countries.

=== Cultural heritage work ===
Kyazze has also been involved in cultural heritage work in Uganda. From January 2005 to February 2007, he served as Minister of State for Heritage, Royal Tombs and Tourism in the Buganda Government.

In 2016, he spoke at the 15th Congress of the International Society of Ethnobiology in Kampala on the Baganda clan system.

=== Rotary work ===
Kyazze has also been active in Rotary International, particularly in the areas of education and literacy. In 2013, a Rotary International presentation identified him as a member of the Basic Education and Literacy Cadre and a member of the Rotary Club of Nateete-Kampala in Uganda.

=== Literary works ===
After retiring from UNESCO, Kyazze focused more on writing. In a 2025 interview with NBS Television, he said that his work with the United Nations had not given him enough time to write, and that retirement gave him the opportunity to write books and novels.

Kyazze has written on culture, education, international public service, fiction, and personal memory. His publications include: The Ganda Clan System, The Place of Culture in Africa (2003), Thirty-Six Years Later: A Unique Love Story (2018), the Making of an International Civil Servant: My Incredible Journey (2020), and Omutuba Ndogoobukaba n'omukululo gwagwo (2022), a Luganda-language book on the history and genealogy of the Ndogoobukaba sub-clan.

In 2024, he published Prof. William Senteza Kajubi: The Man and His Legacy, a biography of Ugandan educationist and former Makerere University vice-chancellor William Senteza Kajubi.

== Legal proceedings ==
In November 2025, the High Court of Uganda, Family Division, dismissed a divorce petition filed by Judith Bakabulindi against Kyazze. The court held that the alleged customary marriage, said to have taken place in 2018, was not legally valid because Kyazze was already in a monogamous marriage at the time.
