= Thereza Piloya =

Ugandan paediatrician

- Occupation: Paediatrician
- Awards: Fellow of the Uganda National Academy of Sciences

Academic background
- Education: Makerere University

Academic work
- Discipline: Paediatrics
- Sub-discipline: Paediatric endocrinology; Paediatric HIV/AIDS
- Institutions: Makerere University

Thereza Piloya-Were (also known as Thereza Piloya and Terry Piloya) is an Ugandan paediatrician who specialises in endocrinology and HIV/AIDS. She is Senior Lecturer at the Makerere University Department of Paediatrics and Child Health.

== Biography ==
Thereza Piloya was educated at Makerere University, where she got her Bachelor of Medicine and Surgery degree, before getting her Master of Medicine degree in paediatrics in 2010. She started working in the Makerere University Department of Paediatrics and Child Health, where she has worked as a lecturer and a paediatric endocrinologist, and has directed both the Paediatric Endocrinology & Diabetes Unit and the undergraduate programme. She was originally Assistant Lecturer at the department before she was promoted to Senior Lecturer at sometime after 2021. She also was part of the staff at Mulago National Specialised Hospital's Paediatric Endocrinology Clinic when it was founded in 2013.

As an academic, she specialises in paediatric endocrinology and paediatric HIV/AIDS. She has also worked as a John E. Fogarty International Center Global Health Fellow, with her research project on the relationship between vitamin D deficiency and paediatric HIV; her mentors were Sarah Cusick, Richard Idro, and Sabrina Kitaka. Among her achievements include improvements on the treatment of paediatric diabetes, including the provision of clinical mentorship. In August 2021, Piloya told the Nile Post about the increase of precocious puberty due to lockdowns caused by the COVID-19 pandemic in Uganda and recommended medical attention for precocious puberty.

She is a fellow of the Uganda National Academy of Sciences.
