= Atlantic International University =

United States degree mill

- Type: Unaccredited private for-profit distance learning university
- Established: 1998; 28 years ago
- Accreditation: None, widely considered a degree mill
- President: Jose M. Atri
- Location: Honolulu, Hawaii, United States; 21.3091601°N 157.8627071°W
- Website: www.aiu.edu

Atlantic International University, Inc. (AIU) is an unaccredited private for-profit distance learning university based in Honolulu, Hawaii. It offers undergraduate and graduate degrees including doctorates. It has been widely described as a degree mill. Atlantic International University degrees are unrecognized in Oregon, illegal to use in Texas, and unsatisfactory for fulfilling civil service requirements in Michigan as such are considered substandard or fraudulent.

== Accreditation ==
Although it is based in the United States, Atlantic International University is not accredited by any recognized United States accreditation agency. It is accredited by the Accreditation Service for International Schools, Colleges and Universities, but this is only for visa purposes; degrees offered by Atlantic International University are not officially recognized in the United Kingdom.

Atlantic International University was formerly accredited by Accrediting Commission International. Accrediting Commission International is an accreditation mill and was established after the International Accrediting Commission, another accreditation mill, was shut down by the State of Missouri for fraud.

Atlantic International University degrees have also been listed as substandard or fraudulent in countries outside the United States, including Ghana, Nigeria (in relation to a branch in Okija), and Oman. It has been characterized as a degree mill, and its degrees have been widely dismissed as "fake."

It has been prosecuted by the Office of Consumer Protection of the State of Hawaii for fraudulently claiming to be an accredited institution. In a 2002 case, the state alleged the following:

“AIU is not now and never has been accredited by a recognized accrediting agency or association recognized by the United States Secretary of Education...AIU has failed to properly and adequately disclose in its promotional materials, specifically its agents' advertising, the fact that it is not fully accredited by any nationally recognized accrediting agency or association listed by the United States Secretary of Education in violation of Hawaii Rev. Stat. § 446E-2(a).”

== Notable alumni ==
- Hassan Ayariga
- Joyce Banda
- William Bazeyo
- Gideon Gono
- David Karpeles, founder of the Karpeles Manuscript Library Museum
- Michael Sata
- Queenstar Pokuah Sawyerr
