= Student movements in Uganda =

Student activism and politics was a significant part of Ugandan higher education in the 20th century. Beginning in the 1930s, Ugandan universities and secondary schools were a center for revolutionary movement. For three decades, most youth movements focused on independence from the British Empire. Following independence in 1962, activist groups shifted focus internally. Student leadership groups at universities around Uganda, especially Makerere University, were politically affiliated and elections for student government were closely tied to political standing. Student activist groups were key opposition against the regimes of Milton Obote and Idi Amin, and students were especially targeted for persecution during Amin's presidency. During Yoweri Musevini's presidency, students have been leading critics, participating in large protests both preceding and following Musevini's move to eliminate presidential term limits in 2006. Consistent opposition to President Yoweri Musevni culminated in three shutdowns of Makerere University.

== Twentieth-Century student movements ==
=== Under colonial British rule ===
The 1950s in Uganda showed a movement towards pan-africanism and independence, supported by the multi-national student bodies of universities like Makerere College and Uganda Christian University. In 1954, students founded the Tanganyika African Welfare Society at Makerere College, designed to promote Tanganyikan independence and fair treatment. The welfare society was considered to be one of the significant student movements of colonial Africa, along with the National Union of Ghana Students.

In the mid-1950s, Abana de Baganda, the student body of Baganda, engaged in tribal protests against the colonial government.

=== After 1962 independence from colonial rule ===
==== Early student philosophy on independent Uganda ====
In the immediate aftermath of independence, there was a divide between staff and students over the role that universities would play in the newfound regime. Senior staff, mostly expatriates and British hires, believed the universities had an obligation to be independent. Local staffers, on the other hand, saw universities as a tool to support a nationalist agenda. According to Mahmood Mamdani in University Crisis and Reform: A Reflection on the African Experience, the locals were ultimately successful and the university became politically linked. However, the educated group of young people consisted mostly of social elites. Rather than taking on the progressive movements of other student movements of the time, a survey of Ugandan university students showed political apathy.

==== Protests during 1960s Milton Obote leadership ====
Milton Obote was the political leader of Uganda from independence in 1962 until 1971. He served as Prime Minister until 1969, when he assumed absolute power following an assassination attempt. There were minor student clashes with Obote both during his leadership.

In May 1968, students protested an anti-British demonstration after three Rhodesian Africans were hanged.

Later that year, a group of students planned a protest in which they intended to parade in front of British High Commission in protest of arms sales to South Africa. The army stopped the march before it left campus, using tear gas to control them.

In 1969, the president of the student guild was arrested and jailed for inciting an illegal demonstration, resulting in Obote's General Service Unit establishing a spy network within the university.

===== Protests during 1970s Idi Amin leadership =====
In 1971, Milton Obote was overthrown by a military coup while on a trip to Singapore. One week after the coup, Idi Amin seized power to become dictator.

In 1972, early in the Amin administration, the National Union of Students of Uganda (NUSU) was banned by the government, followed by a protest against expulsion of Asian students. The President of the Student Guild of Uganda published a statement to Amin criticizing the Asian student policy as racist, and was exiled shortly afterwards. The following two Guild presidents left the country in similar, hasty circumstances. The students chose to disband the guild following the exiles, and did not re-establish it during the Amin regime. According to Bryan Langlands, this was a subtle form of protest as the government urged the students to ignore the exiles and return to normalcy, and the students refused to do so.

In 1972, following administration-supported protests against the expulsion of Asian students, the Vice-Chancellor was killed by the Amin administration. The students boycotted celebrations to commemorate the Makerere's fiftieth anniversary in protest.

In 1976, student protests accelerated to outright defiance of the Amin regime. In February, an Ugandan student named Paul Serwanga was shot directly outside the university, allegedly because a soldier was interested in his girlfriend. 3,500 students marched from Makerere to the student's home in Kibuli, in a "march of mourning." By the time the students reached the center of the city, reports put the numbers at close to 30,000. Shortly afterwards, a Kenyan student named Ester Chesire disappeared. There were speculations that she had been a witness to the Serwanga shooting, and was therefore eliminated. Theresa Nanziri Bukenya, Esther Chesire's dorm warden, subsequently refused to testify before a commission investigating Chesire's disappearance. She was beheaded and dumped in front of the Africa Dorm she monitored. She was eight months pregnant. In March, students boycotted a speech from the President and instead locked themselves in their halls. The student organizers were protected by the administration and the student body, who claimed, "we are all leaders now." Paramilitary groups were called to Makerere campus in July 1976, after students planned a demonstration demanding an investigation into Bukenya's death. To quell protests the Ugandan government allegedly limited provisions of necessities at Makerere, specifically food, electricity, and books.

In August 1976, approximately 100 students were shot by police and military forces during protests.

==== Protests during 1980s and 1990s Milton Obote leadership ====
In 1979, Idi Amin was overthrown by the Tanzanian military following the Uganda-Tanzania War. Obote returned to power.

During the second Obote regime, the Makerere student guild re-established. The guild was led by Opiyo Oloya, a political scientist at the University who encouraged opposition to Obote policies that were perceived to be exasperating ethnic tensions. In 1981 Oloya was forced out of the country.

During the 1980s, political instability, civil war, and HIV/AIDS, greatly diminished the student population in Uganda. Of the refugees fleeing the country in the 1980s, 11.9% were students whose studies were interrupted. In 1980, a large number of students refugees abroad registered to vote in the national election. Obote attempted to visit students living abroad in Koboko during this time period, and there was an attempt to kill him. The UNLA was active in the area, coercing students into voting Obote back into office.

Yoweri Musevini was first democratically elected in 1996. He had already seen the power of student movements as an organizer of strikes at Ntare School and Dar es Salaam University. When he was elected (in a contested election), there was tenuous support from the youth population. Musevini was seen as a unifier, and a member of a "new generation of African leaders."

== Twenty-first century student movements ==
=== 2006 ecological protests against Museveni ===
Over time the Ugandan public has become increasingly disillusioned with the Musevini administration. In 2005, the legislature amended the constitution to allow Musevini to run for a third term. Additionally, right after the elections in 2006, Musevini deeded acres of the Mabira Forest to the Sugar Corporation of Ugandan Limited. There were allegations that Musevini and his administration received direct payments from the SCOUL to fund their 2006 presidential campaign. In one of the first examples of the internet being used to mobilize in Uganda, thousands of people protested in Kampala against the ecological violation. An estimated 300 students were involved in these protests, which also contributed to a buildup of grievances. The government under Musevini's guidance also cut funding, withheld allowances, and refused salary increases at Makerere University. These issues combined to contribute to a mass student and teacher strike. On November 12, 2006 Musevini closed down Makerere University, using his authority granted by Makerere's semi-nationalized funding structure. The last time the government shut down a university was 1989, during the civil war. The university was re-opened in January 2007.

=== 2013 closing of Makerere University protest ===
In 2013, teachers and students went on strike to protest the university and government's failure to pay promised salary increases. The government released a statement saying the "demand of 100% salary increase is not affordable in the short term."

=== 2016 Kasese Massacre ===
In November 2016, protests erupted in the Rwenzururu region of Uganda, most violently in the city of Kasese. Historically the Rwenzururu region was unstable, especially in the early 1960s culminating in the massacre of Kongo and Amba civilians by Tooro military forces. In 2008, Rwenzururu was officially recognized as a kingdom in the eyes of the Ugandan government. However, following recognition by the government inter-kingdom conflict between the Kongo and Amba groups accelerated. In early 2016, there were conflicts over politics and local election results and approximately 30 people died.

In November 2016, according to the Human Rights watch, "the military and police attacked the kingdom's administration offices and the palace compound." Popular protests erupted through Kasese, and according to the Human Rights Watch over 100 people were killed by the Ugandan government. Among the victims were a 17-year-old student working at the government building. Students throughout Uganda protested the massacre, and it was added to a bill of grievances brought by students and teachers at Makerere during strikes in the summer of 2016.

=== 2016 closing of Makerere University protest ===
On November 2, Musevini closed Makerere University in response to a teacher and student led strike. The main reason for the strike was back payment of allowances over the 2016 year, and budget cuts in the department of education. There were also tensions between students and the government over the 2016 Kasese Massacre, and Musevini's move to eliminate the constitutional age cap to further extend his power. Mass strikes resulted in destruction of property, contributing to the decision to shut down the university.

=== 2018 social media tax protest ===
In August 2018, the Ugandan government instituted a tax on social media, SMS, and What's App. Since the 2006 protests, social media has been increasingly used as an organizing and protest tool amongst young people in Uganda. While President Musevini claimed at the time the tax was intended to improve productivity, he had a history of censoring social media. He fully shut down social networks during the 2011 and 2016 elections, and there was a growing number of people who had been arrested for posting critical statements against the administration online. The social media tax also came in the wake of the populist election of MP Bobi Wine, who communicated with his supporters via Facebook, Instagram, and Twitter. According to a statement from Amnesty International, “This is a clear attempt to silence dissent, in the guise of raising government revenues.”

Within a day, students mobilized online, using VPNs to bypass the tax and protesting with the #NoSocialMediaTax and #ThisTaxMustGo. There were also thousands of citizens who protested across Uganda, the majority of whom were under the age of 30. A group of students from Makerere University also petitioned Rebecca Kadaga over the social media tax, incentivizing her to speak out against the tax before the house. Following the public outcry, the government decreased the tax on mobile money transactions, but as of November 27, 2018, the tax on social media stands.
