= Kituuma Rusoke =

Ugandan police officer

Public Relations Officer and Spokesperson of the Uganda Police Force
- Incumbent
- Assumed office 30 June 2024
- Preceded by: Fred Enanga

Personal details
- Born: Kyenjojo District, Uganda
- Education: Makerere University: Bachelor of Arts in Social Sciences; Master of Arts in Peace and Conflict Studies
- Occupation: Police officer

Military service
- Rank: Assistant Commissioner of Police

Kituuma Rusoke is a Ugandan Assistant Commissioner of Police (ACP) currently serving as the Public Relations Officer and Spokesperson for the Uganda Police Force appointed on June 30, 2024, by the Inspector General of Police, Abbas Byakagaba.

== Early life and education ==
Rusoke was born in Kyenjojo District in Tooro Sub-region to Kajabagu Karusoke (father). He graduated from Makerere University with a Bachelors of Arts in Social Sciences majoring in economics and political science. He also holds a Master of Arts in Peace and Conflict Studies from the same institution.

== Career ==
Rusoke joined police force as a Cadet on September 1, 2007, he was first in an acting position as the Officer-in-Charge of Operations in Entebbe then promoted to an Officer in Charge. He was then transferred to Police Training School in Kabalye, Masindi District where he served as an administration officer before being transferred to Kampala where he served as the District Police Commander at Old Kampala. He also severed as the District Police Commander of several districts including; Mitooma District, Kiboga District, Kampala Metropolitan Area, Wamala Region and later with Kampala Capital City Authority (KCCA) as the manager security and enforcement operations.

He was then transferred to East Kyoga region where he served as deputy Regional Police Commander (RPC) and then full Regional Police Commander (RPC). He also served as Regional Police Commander (RPC) for the Rwizi Region. In 2023, Rusoke was appointed as a member of the Police Council, replacing Fred Enanga.

== See also ==
- Fred Enanga
- Kale Kayihura
