= Ibanda =

Town in Uganda

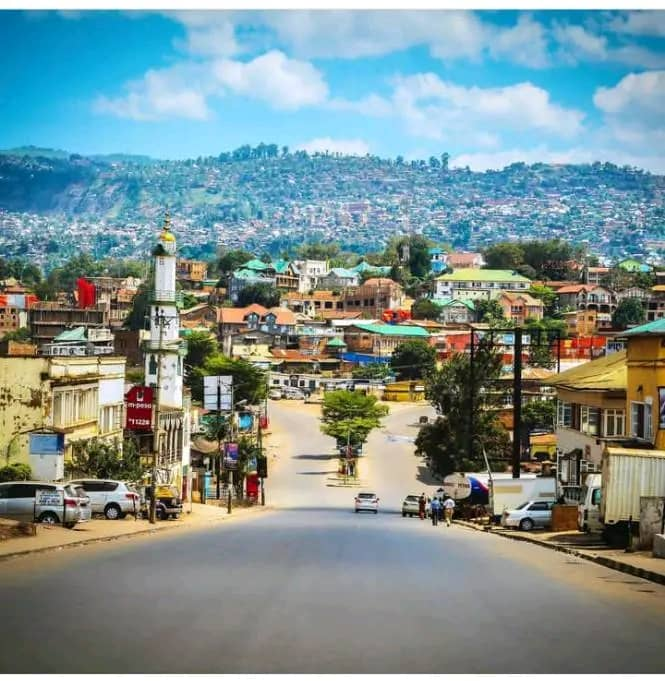
- Ibanda

- Map of Uganda showing the location of Ibanda.
- Coordinates: 00°08′05″S 30°29′42″E
- District: Ibanda District
- Elevation: 1,400 m (4,600 ft)

Population (2024 Census)
  - Total: 126,088
- Time zone: UTC+3 (EAT)
- Climate: Aw

Ibanda is a town in the Western Region of Uganda. It is the main political, administrative, and commercial centre of Ibanda District and the site of the district headquarters. It started way back in the 1990s and was elevated from a trading centre to a town board, town council and in 2016 it was granted the municipality status. The Municipal Council has three Divisions of Kagongo, Bisheshe and Bufunda with 21 wards of Kyaruhanga, Bufunda, Nyamirima, Nsasi, Kayenje, Kashangura, Rwenshuri, Kigarama, Rugazi, Rwobuzizi, Kakatsi, Bugarama, Karangara, Kabaare, Kanyansheko, Nyakatookye, Kyeikucu, Kikoni, Kagongo, Ruyonza and Katongore ward. Ibanda Municipal Council has over 230 villages. Ibanda Municipal council commenced its operations on 1 July 2016 after being elevated from a Town Council and other sub counties that were annexed to. (Bisheshe Sub County, Nsasi, Part of Nyabuhikye Sub County and Kashangura).

== Location ==
Ibanda is located approximately 70 kilometres (43 mi), by road, northwest of Mbarara, the largest city in the Ankole sub-region. This is about 290 kilometres (180 mi), by road, southwest of Kampala, the capital of and largest city in Uganda. The coordinates of the town are 0°08'05.0"S, 30°29'42.0"E (Latitude:-0.134712; Longitude:30.495000).

Ibanda Municipal Council is located in Ibanda South Constituency of Ibanda District, south western part of Uganda. It borders with Igorora Town Council, Kikyenkye, Kijongo and Ishongororo sub-counties of Ibanda District, Kinoni s/c in Kiruhura District and Kicheche Sub-County of Kamwenge district and it hosts the Ibanda District headquarters. The total geographical area of the council is about 372.21 square kilometres (143.71 sq mi), both dry land (built environment and open land) wetlands and open water area. The former town council started back in 1994 with two wards of Bufunda and Kagongo and during the physical development plan process in 2010, three more wards were created i.e. Rugazi, Kigarama and Kyaruhanga, covering a total area of 51.49 km^{2} (19.88 sq mi).

== History ==
Ibanda is known for the killing of Harry George Galt, a British sub-commissioner for the western province of the Uganda Protectorate, on 19 May 1905. Its name came from a native word Ibandwa where the local people used to climb the hill to settle their misfortunes with their gods hence translated as ibandwa hill.

== Population ==
The 2002 national census estimated the population of Ibanda at 22,730. In 2010, the Uganda Bureau of Statistics (UBOS) estimated the population at 27,800. In 2011, UBOS estimated the mid-year population at 28,500. In 2014, the national population census put the population at 31,316.

== Points of interest ==
The following additional points of interest lie in Ibanda town or close to its borders:

- offices of Ibanda Town Council
- the headquarters of Ibanda District Administration
- Ibanda University, a private co-educational institution of higher learning, established in 2014.
- Uganda Martyrs' Hospital Ibanda, a community hospital administered by the Roman Catholic Archdiocese of Mbarara

== Photos ==
- Another View of Ibanda Town

== See also ==
- Patrick Bitature
- List of cities and towns in Uganda
