= Robert Kezaala =

Ugandan public health doctor

Dr. Robert Kezaala is a medical doctor, epidemiologist, scholar and public health leader in the field of immunization and health emergencies. Currently he is serving as a Senior Health Advisor and team lead for Accelerated Immunization Initiatives: measles, rubella, epidemic meningitis and yellow fever control and Immunization in Emergencies at the United Nations Children’s Fund.

== Education ==
Kezaala received his medical degree from Makerere University in Kampala, Uganda. He also holds an MPH from the Royal Tropical Institute (KIT) in Amsterdam, Netherlands majoring in epidemiology and health planning.

== Career ==
Kezaala has over 30 years of professional experience in public health including 24 years at international level. In the late 1980s, Dr. Kezaala practiced as Medical Officer in Karamoja province in the northeast of Uganda with recognized work in immunization and Tuberculosis control. From 1992 to 1993, Dr Kezaala worked with UNDP in multi-sectoral HIV/AIDS control where he managed the collaborative program that supported Uganda government efforts to address the AIDS epidemic. Thereafter, until 1998, he worked with the International Federation of Red Cross and Red Crescent Societies (IFRC) as Regional Health Delegate for Eastern and Southern Africa, managing a variety of health interventions including HIV/AIDS control, community water and sanitation and refugee health and emergency response when he led IFRC's initial health response in Goma during the 1994 Rwanda crisis. Subsequently, he joined the World Health Organization (WHO), where he worked for 14 years, first as epidemiologist and Team Lead for WHO-EPI in Ethiopia. From 2001 to 2005, Kezaala headed Measles Control for the Africa Region of WHO, when the Africa region registered a reduction in measles mortality by 70%. He spent the next seven years serving as a medical officer with the Polio Eradication Initiative at the WHO headquarters in Geneva, Switzerland. While here, he worked in country support across the globe, including Chad, Pakistan, the Horn of Africa and served as the outbreak response manager for the 2010 Polio outbreak that affected Tajikistan, Kazakhstan and Russia. During the stint in GPEI, Dr Kezaala developed the Short Interval Additional Dose (SIAD) tactical approach that has since become a standard for Polio outbreak response. In 2012, Dr Kezaala served as WHO liaison officer to the US Centers for Disease Control (CDC) in setting up the Emergency Operations Centre (EOC) for CDC's global Polio Eradication Initiative. Since June 2012, Dr Kezaala has served as Senior Health Advisor at the UNICEF headquarters in New York in charge of the Accelerated Immunization Initiatives - responsible for Measles and Rubella control, Yellow Fever, epidemic Meningitis and immunization in emergency settings. In 2016, he was instrumental as liaison officer to WHO in the response to the central Africa Yellow Fever outbreak that affected Angola and the Democratic Republic of Congo.

Numerous news outlets, such as U.S. News, CNN, TV2Africa, and allAfrica, have quoted Dr. Kezaala. He is also a thought leader in topics related to public health, vaccines, health diplomacy and on Uganda.
