= Barnabas Nawangwe =

Ugandan architect (born 1956)

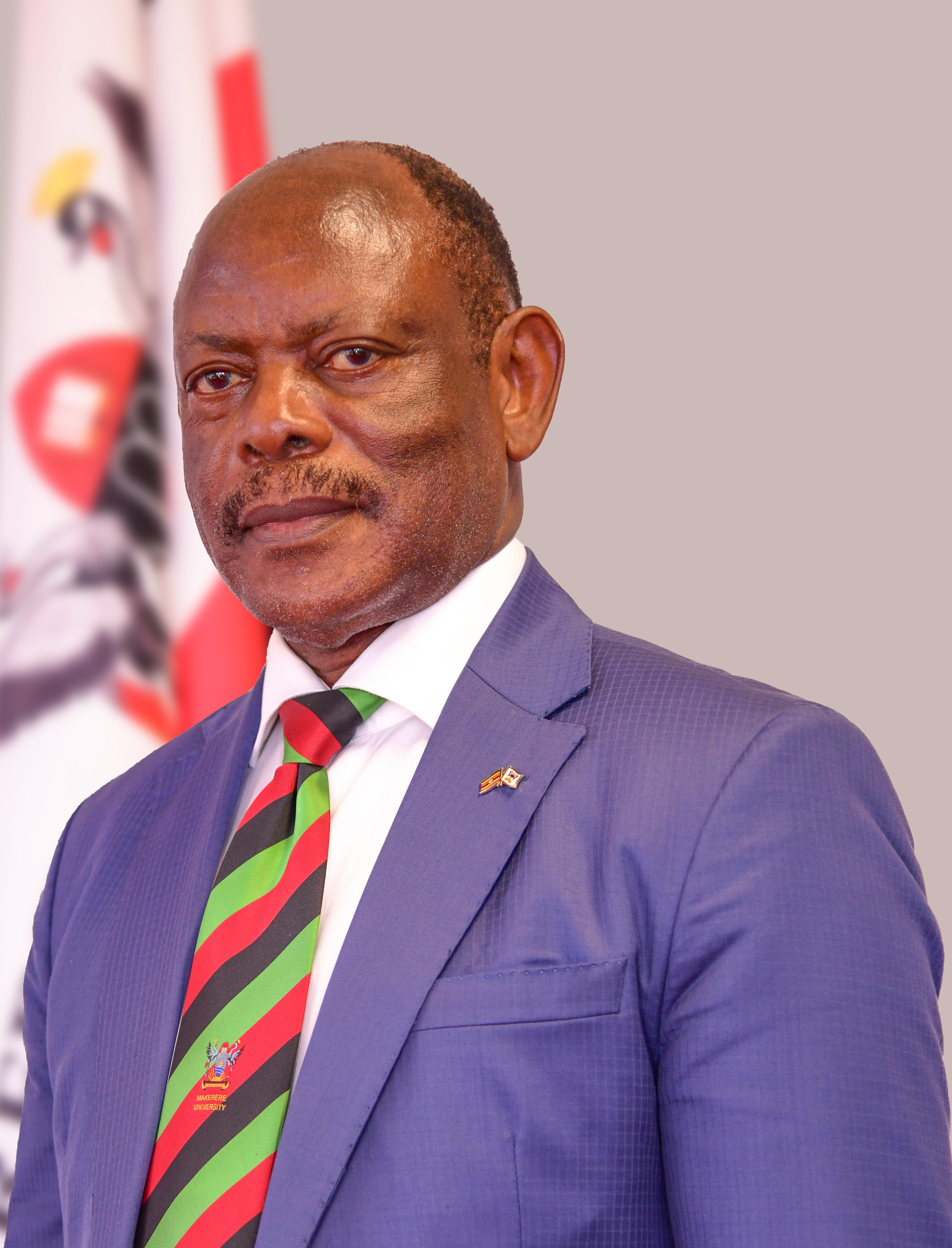
- Official portrait, 2024
- Born: 17 January 1956 (age 70); Busia, Uganda
- Citizenship: Uganda
- Education: Busoga College Mwiri (East African Certificate of Education) (East African Advanced Certificate of Education); Kiev Institute of Building Technology (Master of Science in architecture) (Doctor of Philosophy)
- Occupations: Architect, academic, university administrator
- Years active: 1987–present
- Title: Vice chancellor,Makerere University

Barnabas Nawangwe (born 17 January 1956) is a Ugandan architect, academic and the current vice chancellor of the Makerere University (the largest public university of Uganda). He served his first five-year term from 2017 until August 2022. On 12 August 2022, the Makerere University Council re-appointed him for a second term of five years.

== Background and education ==
He was born in Busia District, Uganda, in the Eastern Region of the country. He attended Busoga College Mwiri for both his O-Level and A-Level education. He holds a specialist diploma equivalent to a Msc in architecture and a Candidate of Sciences, both from the Kiev Institute of Civil Engineering.

== Career ==
Nawangwe was a lecturer and head of the Department of Architecture, from the time the department was founded in 1987 until 2002. He became senior lecturer in 1996. In 2002, he was appointed associate dean, Faculty of Technology. The following year, he became dean, Faculty of Technology, Makerere University, serving in that capacity from 2003 until 2010. In 2004, he became a professor. From 2010 to 2013, he served as the principal of the College of Engineering, Design, Art and Technology.

At the time of his election as vice chancellor, he served as deputy vice chancellor for Finance and Administration, "responsible for the planning, budgeting and development of the university".

Prof. Nawangwe was installed as vice chancellor of Makerere University on 14 September 2017, at a ceremony at which the president of Uganda was the chief guest.

== Membership in professional and academic organizations ==
- Past chairman, Architects Registration Board
- Member of the board of trustees of the Uganda Society of Architects
- Chairman of the Steering Committee of the Centre for Tobacco Control in Africa (CTCA)
- Member of the board of trustees of Uganda Gatsby Trust
- Patron of Resilient Africa Network (RAN)
- Third board chairman of African Research Universities Alliance
- Member of the Executive Committee of the Association of Commonwealth Universities

== Scholarly work ==
Nawangwe has participated in extensive research work and has presented numerous papers at local and international conferences and published several articles in internationally reviewed journals and books.

=== Journal articles ===
- "Repositioning Africa in global knowledge production", published in The Lancet Volume 392 issue 10153 page 1163–1166 on 29 September 2018
- "User Participation in the Eyes of an Architect and Gendered Spaces", published in Second International Conference on Advances in Engineering and Technology volume 1 issue 1 pages 57–63
- "The Architectural transformation of Makerere University neighbourhoods during the Period 1990–2010 in Second International Conference on Advances in Engineering and Technology", published in 2011
- "The evolution of the Kibuga into Kampala's city centre - analysis of the transformation of an African city in African Perspectives Conference Proceedings", published in 2010
- "Development and Promotion of Bamboo Housing Technology in East Africa", published in 2011
- "Between Global and Regional Visions: The Way Forward for Uganda's Cities", published in 2013
- "Globalization and Regionalism: Complimentary or Antagonistic Paradigms", published in 2012
- "Architectural modernism: in post-independence Uganda" in conference proceedings Modern Architecture in East Africa around Independence page 149 published in 2005

== Awards ==
Nawangwe was named African Educationist of the Year by the African Leadership Magazine.

== Other considerations ==
Nawangwe serves as a consultant architect and has been involved in many architectural projects at the university for a period stretching back at least 20 years. He is also an external examiner at the University of Nairobi, the Royal Institute of Technology in Stockholm and the Oslo School of Architecture.

== Succession table as vice-chancellor of Makerere University ==
Preceded by John Ddumba Ssentamu; 2012 – 2017	Vice Chancellor of Makerere University; 2017 – 2027	Succeeded by To be determined 2027 – 2032
