= Ibanda District =

District in Uganda

- District
- District location in Uganda
- Coordinates: 00°07′S 30°30′E
- Country: Uganda
- Region: Western Region
- Sub-region: Ankole sub-region
- Capital: Ibanda

Area
  - Total: 964.8 km^{2} (372.5 sq mi)

Population (2012 Estimate)
  - Total: 255,500
  - Density: 264.8/km^{2} (686/sq mi)
- Time zone: UTC+3 (EAT)
- Area code: 061
- Website: www.ibanda.go.ug

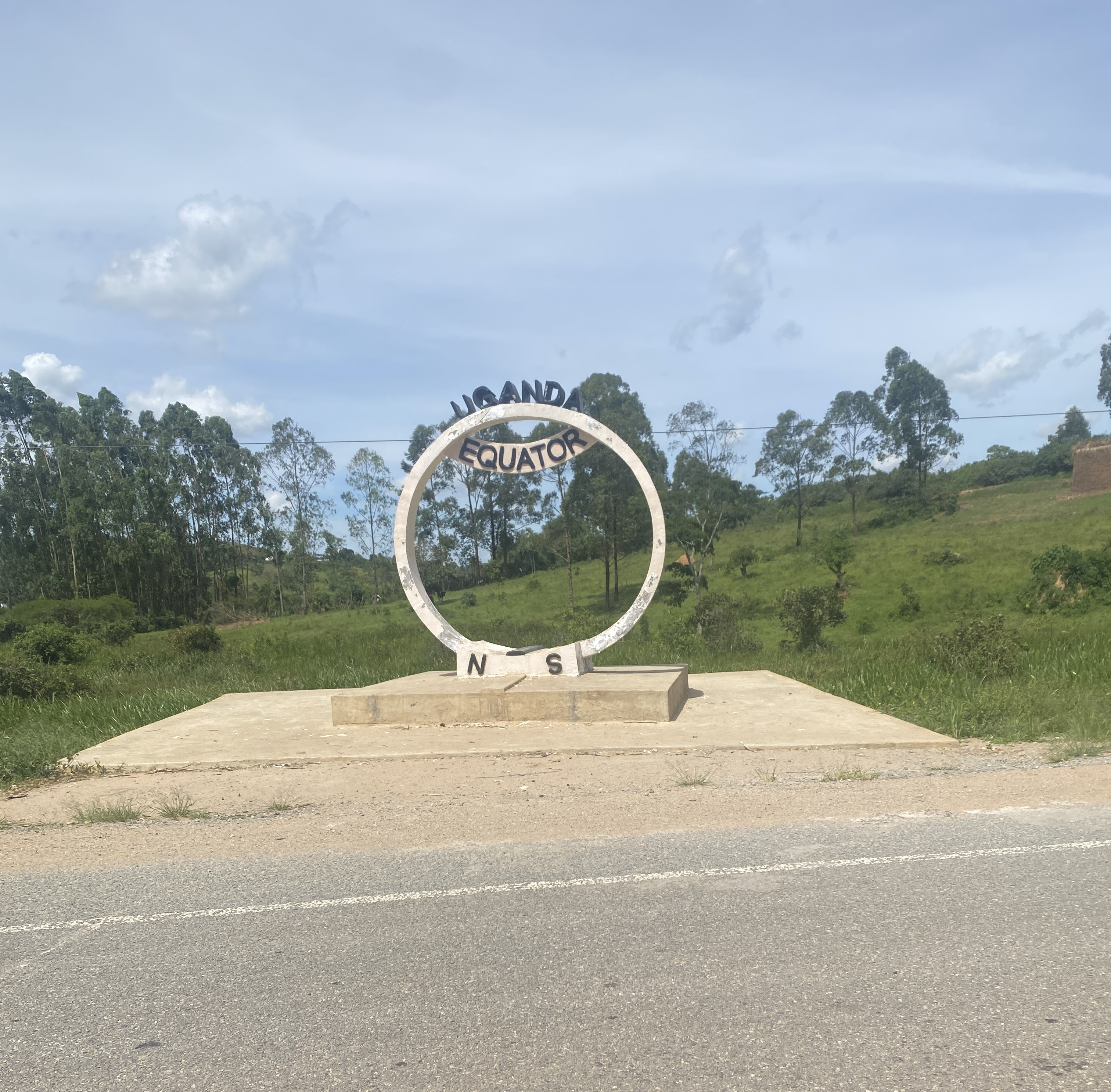
Equator monument in Ibanda District

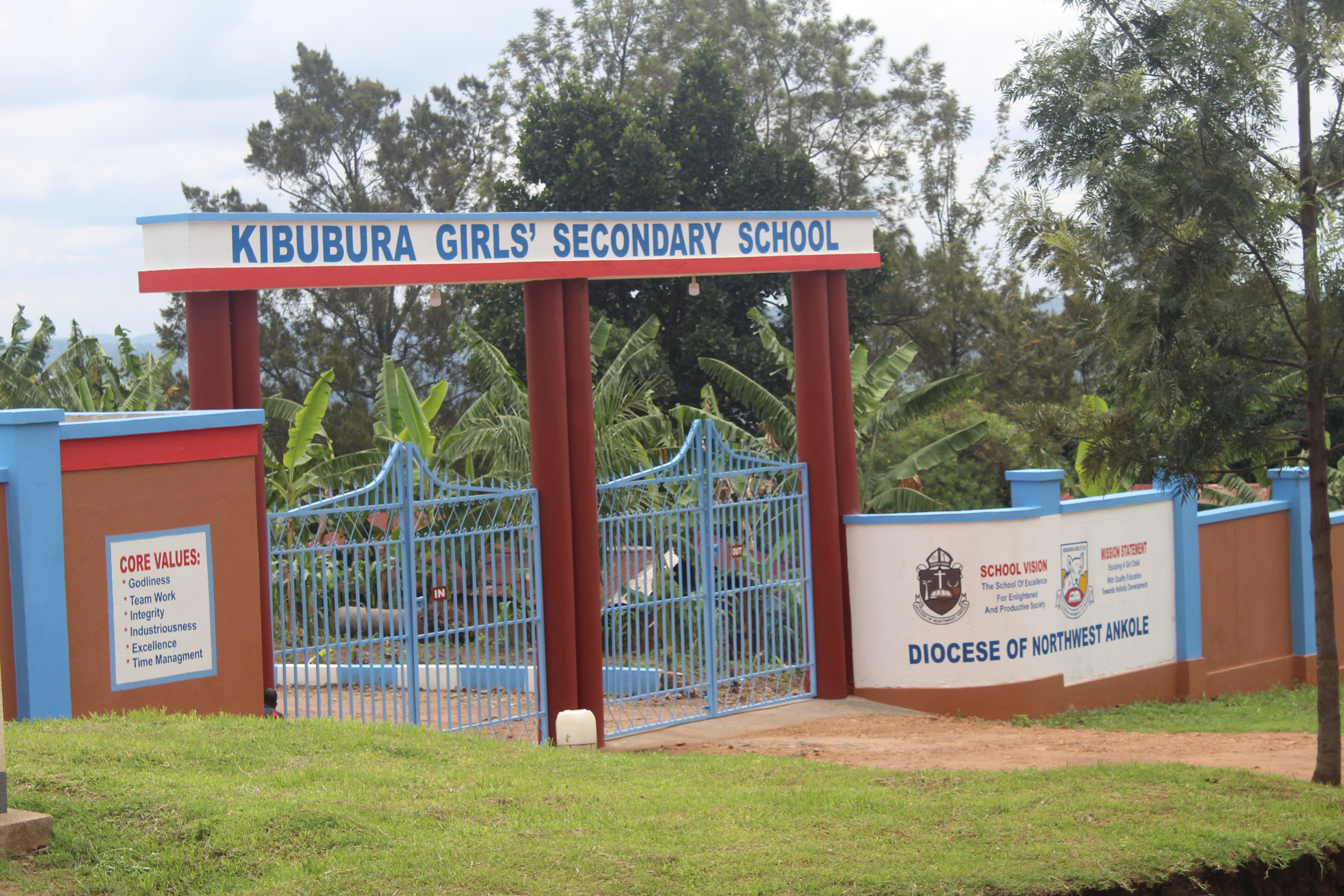
Kibubura Girls' Secondary School in Ibanda District in Western Uganda.

Ibanda District is a district in the Western Region of Uganda. The town of Ibanda is the site of the district headquarters.

== Location ==
Ibanda District is bordered by Kitagwenda District to the west, Kamwenge District to the north, Kiruhura District to the east, Mbarara District and Buhweju District to the south, and Rubirizi District to the southwest. The district headquarters at Ibanda are located approximately 75 kilometres (47 mi) northwest of Mbarara, the largest city in the Ankole sub-region.

== Overview ==
Ibanda District was created on 1 July 2005, by elevating Ibanda County, formerly part of Mbarara District, to full district status.

Ibanda is connected to the national electricity grid with a sub-station 4 miles (6.4 km) outside Mbarara town. A tarmac road connects via Mbarara to the capital Kampala.

There is one major hospital, Ibanda Hospital, administered by the Roman Catholic Archdiocese of Mbarara. The hospital has an affiliated school for enrolled midwives and nurses.

== Population ==
In 1991, the national population census estimated the district population at 148,000. The 2002 census estimated the population at 198,700. The population has a calculated annual growth rate of 2.6 percent. The population in 2012 was about 255,500.

== Economic activities ==
Agriculture forms the backbone of the economy of the district. Most of the agriculture is on the subsistence level. The largest farm in the district is the Kiburara Prison Farm, located at Kiburara Prison. The crops grown in the district include the following:

- Coffee
- Bananas
- Matooke
- Mangoes
- Beans
- Maize
- Groundnuts
- Passion fruit
- Jack fruit
- Water melon
- sweet potato
- irish potato

== Prominent people ==
Prominent people from the district include the following:

- Patrick Bitature, businessman, entrepreneur, and industrialist. He is one of the wealthiest people in Uganda. Chairman of Umeme.
- Venansius Baryamureeba Ugandan mathematician, computer scientist, academic, and academic administrator. Chancellor of Ibanda University.

== Livestock ==
- Cattle
- Goats
- Pigs
- Chicken

== See also ==
- Districts of Uganda
- Western Region, Uganda
