= John Ddumba Ssentamu =

Ugandan economist, academic and banker (born 1953 - death 2021)

- Born: 1953 (age 72–73); Masaka, Uganda
- Education: Makerere University (Bachelor of Arts in Economics) (Doctor of Philosophy in Economics); University of Waterloo (Master of Arts in Economics)
- Occupations: Economist, academic, banker, academic administrator
- Years active: 1979 – present
- Title: Former Vice-Chancellor, Makerere University & Professor of Economics

John Ddumba Ssentamu (born 1953) is a Ugandan economist, academic and banker. He is a professor of economics and former Vice-Chancellor (2012-2017) at Makerere University, Uganda's oldest university, founded in 1922. He is chairman of Centenary Bank, the second-largest indigenous commercial bank in the country.

== Background ==
He was born in 1953, in Masaka District, Buddu County, Central Uganda.

== Education ==
Professor Ddumba Ssentamu attended St. Mary's College Kisubi for his 0-Level and A-Level classes (S1-S6). He then entered Makerere University in 1974, to study Economics, graduating with the degree of Bachelor of Arts in Economics, in 1977. He then left Makerere to pursue further studies in Canada.

He obtained the degree of Master of Arts in Economics, from the University of Waterloo, in Waterloo, Ontario, Canada in 1979. He then returned to Makerere to pursue his doctorate degree, graduating with the degree of Doctor of Philosophy (PhD), also in Economics.

== Professional career ==
For over 35 years, he has served as lecturer, senior lecturer, associate professor and professor at Makerere University. At the time of his appointment to his current post, he was the Principal of the College of Business and Management Science at Makerere University. He is reported to have about 30 publications to his name. He has served as chairman of the board at Centenary Bank for over 10 years. During that period, the bank has grown from a small microfinance institution into the second-largest indigenous commercial bank in Uganda. Over the years, Professor Ddumba Ssentamu has served as an external examiner, part-time lecturer or external vetter for staff promotions at one of the following institutions:

- The University of Waterloo in Waterloo, Ontario, Canada.
- Nelson Mandela Metropolitan University in Port Elizabeth, South Africa
- The University of Ghana in Legon, Ghana
- The University of Swaziland in Mbabane, Swaziland
- Kwame Nkrumah University of Science and Technology in Kumasi, Ghana and
- The University of Dar es Salaam in Tanzania

He has also served as a consultant for various United Nations agencies including UNDP, FAO, WHO, WFP, and others like USAID and the Swedish Government.

== Personal details ==
Ssentamu is married. He is of the Roman Catholic faith.

== Succession table as Vice-Chancellor of Makerere University ==
Preceded by Venansius Baryamureeba; 2009 – 2012	Vice Chancellor of Makerere University; 2012 – 2017	Succeeded by Barnabas Nawangwe

== See also ==
- List of universities in Uganda
- List of Ugandan university leaders
- List of banks in Uganda
