= William Wasswa =

Ugandan physician, academician, and a medical researcher (born 1988)

- Born: 1988 (age 37–38); Mulago Hospital, Uganda
- Citizenship: Uganda
- Education: Mbarara University (Bachelor in Computer Engineering), (Master of Biomedical Engineering), University of Cape Town (PhD in Biomedical Imaging)
- Occupations: lecturer, physician, researcher, academic administrator
- Years active: 2004— present
- Known for: Lecturer, researcher, academic administration
- Title: Head of Department Biomedical Sciences and Engineering at Mbarara University

William Wasswa is a Ugandan lecturer, engineer and researcher. He serves as a senior lecturer in the Department of Biomedical Sciences and Engineering at Mbarara University of Science and Technology in Uganda.

== Background ==
He was born at Mulago Hospital, in Kampala, Uganda's capital city, in 1988.

== Education ==
Wasswa holds a bachelor's degree in Computer Engineering from Mbarara University, a master's degree in Biomedical Engineering from University of Cape Town and a PhD in Biomedical Engineering from Mbarara University. His PhD research was on the application of A1 for Cervical Cancer diagnosis. He is an AfyaBora Global Health Leader Postdoctoral Fellow.

== Work experience ==
He is the CEO of Global Auto Systems Ltd Uganda, a startup revolutionizing service delivery with use of AI, Data analytics, Block chain and Robotics. and cloud Computing technologies to improve patient outcomes while reducing the total cost of care. He works on a digital platform called Papsi A1 for automated diagnosis and management of cervical cancer in low and middle income countries. Currently he is the head of the Department of Biomedical sciences and Engineering at Mbarara University of Science and Technology.

== Other Considerations ==
In 2020, he was amongst the shortlisted candidates for the UK Royal Academy of Engineering Africa Prize for Innovation 2020 where he won a grant of $13000. He has expertise knowledge in Artificial Intelligence, Medical Imaging and Robotics. He is a technical member of the expert panel on drafting the AU High level on Artificial Intelligence for Africa by AUDA-NEPAD and also a member of the ITU-WHO Focus Group on Artificial Intelligence for Health. He was among the WHO Top Africa Innovations at second WHO Africa Health Forum which took place in Cape Verde (2019) and he showcased in African Innovation at Commonwealth Health Ministers meeting in Geneva Switzerland 2019. He is a member of Mbarara University Quality Assurance Committee and Research Ethics Committee and also leads the Biomedical Engineering student’s community engagement program in the department of Biomedical Sciences and Engineering.

== Research ==
He has published the finding of his research on Artificial Intelligence, Medical Imaging, Microfluidics, Cancer genesis diagnosis and treatment, Biomechanics, in medical journals and other peer publications hence cited with an H-Index of 9 with 487 citations in over 9 peer-reviewed journal in scientific publications.

== Selected publications ==
- William, Wasswa; Ware, Andrew; Basaza-Ejiri, Annabella Habinka; Obungoloch, Johnes (2019). "Cervical cancer classification from Pap-smears using an enhanced fuzzy C-means algorithm". Informatics in Medicine Unlocked. 14: 23–33. doi:10.1016/j.imu.2019.02.001.
- William, Wasswa; Ware, Andrew; Basaza-Ejiri, Annabella Habinka; Obungoloch, Johnes (December 2019). "A pap-smear analysis tool (PAT) for detection of cervical cancer from pap-smear images". BioMedical Engineering OnLine. 18 (1): 16. doi:10.1186/s12938-019-0634-5. PMC 6373062. PMID 30755214.
- William, Wasswa; Ware, Andrew; Basaza-Ejiri, Annabella Habinka; Obungoloch, Johnes (October 2018). "A review of image analysis and machine learning techniques for automated cervical cancer screening from pap-smear images". Computer Methods and Programs in Biomedicine. 164: 15–22. doi:10.1016/j.cmpb.2018.05.034. PMID 30195423. S2CID 52177467.
- William, Wasswa; Basaza-Ejiri, Annabella Habinka; Obungoloch, Johnes; Ware, Andrew (May 2018). "A Review of Applications of Image Analysis and Machine Learning Techniques in Automated Diagnosis and Classification of Cervical Cancer from Pap-smear Images". 2018 IST-Africa Week Conference (IST-Africa): Page 1 of 11–Page 11 of 11.
- Mutsvangwa, T.; Wasswa, W.; Burdin, V.; Borotikar, B.; Douglas, T.S. (2017). "Interactive patient-specific 3D approximation of scapula bone shape from 2D X-ray images using landmark-constrained statistical shape model fitting". 2017 39th Annual International Conference of the IEEE Engineering in Medicine and Biology Society (EMBC). Annual International Conference of the IEEE Engineering in Medicine and Biology Society. IEEE Engineering in Medicine and Biology Society. Annual International Conference. Vol. 2017. pp. 1816–1819. doi:10.1109/EMBC.2017.8037198. ISBN 978-1-5090-2809-2. PMID 29060242. S2CID 12169815.
- William, Wasswa; de Jager, Kylie; John, Lester; Steiner, Stefan (1 June 2016). "X-Ray Beam-Width Limiting Device1". Journal of Medical Devices. 10 (2): 020917. doi:10.1115/1.4033208.

== Conferences ==
Wasswa has attended several conferences such as;

- Next Einstein Forum
- Commonwealth Health Ministers Meeting in Geneva, Switzerland, 19 May 2019.
- Expert Consultations on Artificial Intelligence Workshop in Johannesburg, South Africa from May 29–31, 2019.
- Second WHO Africa Health Forum 26–28 March 2019, Praia, Cabo Verde.
- IST-Africa 2019 Conference, Laico Regency Hotel, Nairobi, 08 - 10 May 2019.
- IST-Africa 2018 Conference, Gaborone International Conference Centre, Botswana, 09 - 11 May 2018.
- Innovations Tech Summit for Africa, May 2019, Mbarara Uganda. Technical program committee member.
- The 6th East African Healthcare Engineering Regional Conference and Exhibition (EARC 2018) 28–29 November 2018 Kampala, Uganda.
- Health Innovations Conference, 19–20 March 2019, Kampala Serena Hotel.
- 15th International Congress on American Pathology & Oncology Research (2018).
- National Cancer Research Institute, UK. Partners in Cancer Research Conference Glasgow, 2018.

== Awards ==
In 2020, he was among the finalists of the UK Royal Academy of Engineering Africa Prize for Engineering Innovation
