= Makerere University =

Public university in Kampala, Uganda

- Motto: "We build for the future"
- Type: Public
- Established: 1922; 104 years ago
- Parent institution: Formerly the University of London and the University of East Africa
- Chancellor: Crispus Kiyonga
- Vice-Chancellor: Barnabas Nawangwe
- Administrative staff: 3,174 (2018)
- Students: 35,000+ (2018)
- Location: Kampala, Uganda; 00°20′06″N 32°34′03″E
- Campus: 300 acres; Urban
- Website: www.mak.ac.ug
- Location within Kampala

Makerere University (/məˈkɛrəri/; Mak, also MUK) is Uganda's largest and oldest institution of higher learning, first established as a technical school in 1922, and the oldest currently active university in East Africa. It became an independent national university in 1970. Today, Makerere University is composed of nine colleges and one school, offering programmes for about 36,000 undergraduates and 4,000 postgraduates. Its main campus is in the Makerere neighborhood in Kampala. In addition, Makerere has another campus in Jinja, Uganda.

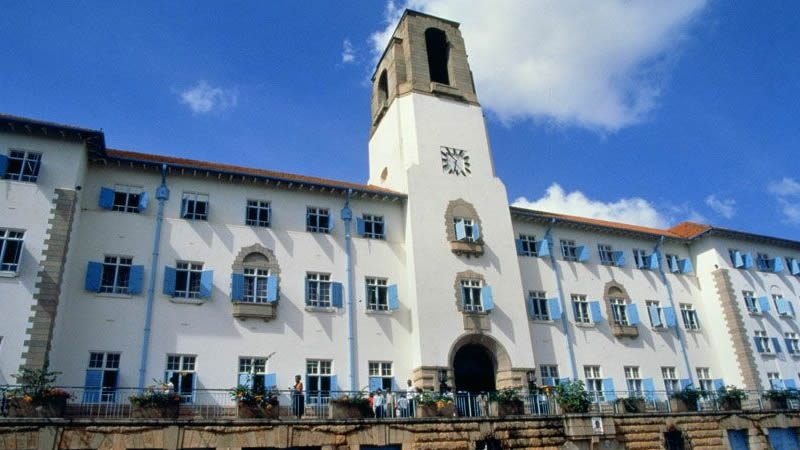
The Main Administration block for Makerere University, normally called the Main Building

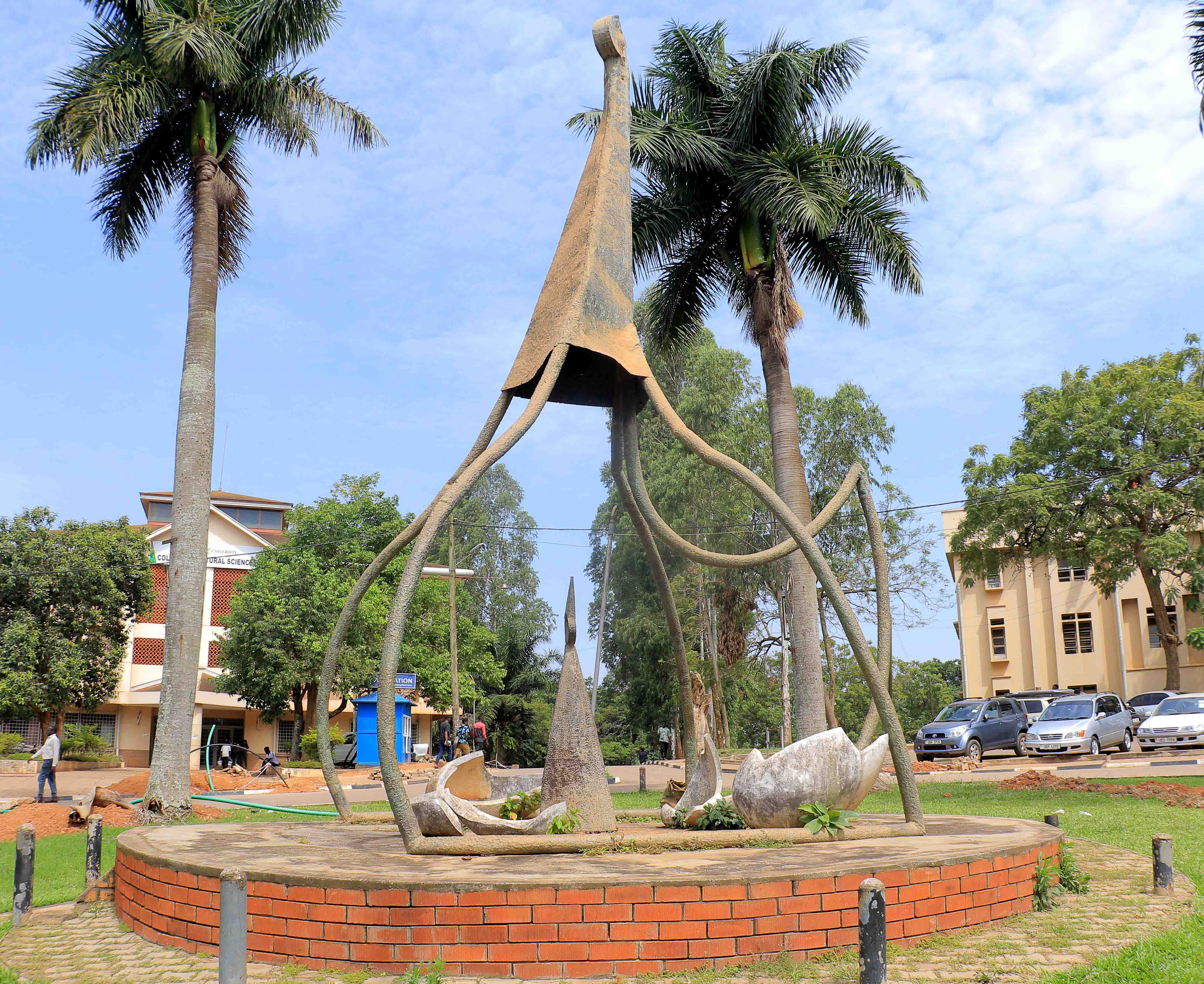
Jubilee Monument

Makerere University is the alma mater of many post-independence African leaders, including Ugandan president Milton Obote and Tanzanian presidents Julius Nyerere and Benjamin Mkapa. The former president of the Democratic Republic of the Congo, Joseph Kabila, and former Kenyan president the late Mwai Kibaki are also Makerere alumni.

In the years immediately after Uganda's independence, Makerere University was a focal point for the literary activity that was central to African nationalist culture. Many prominent writers, including Nuruddin Farah, Ali Mazrui, David Rubadiri, Okello Oculi, Ngũgĩ wa Thiong'o, John Ruganda, Paul Theroux, Nobel Prize laureate V. S. Naipaul, and Peter Nazareth, were at Makerere University at one point in their writing and academic careers.

Because of student unrest and faculty disenchantment, the university was closed three times between 2006 and 2016. After the third closing, it was reopened in January 2017. The main administrative block was gutted by fire in September 2020 and reconstructed.

== History ==
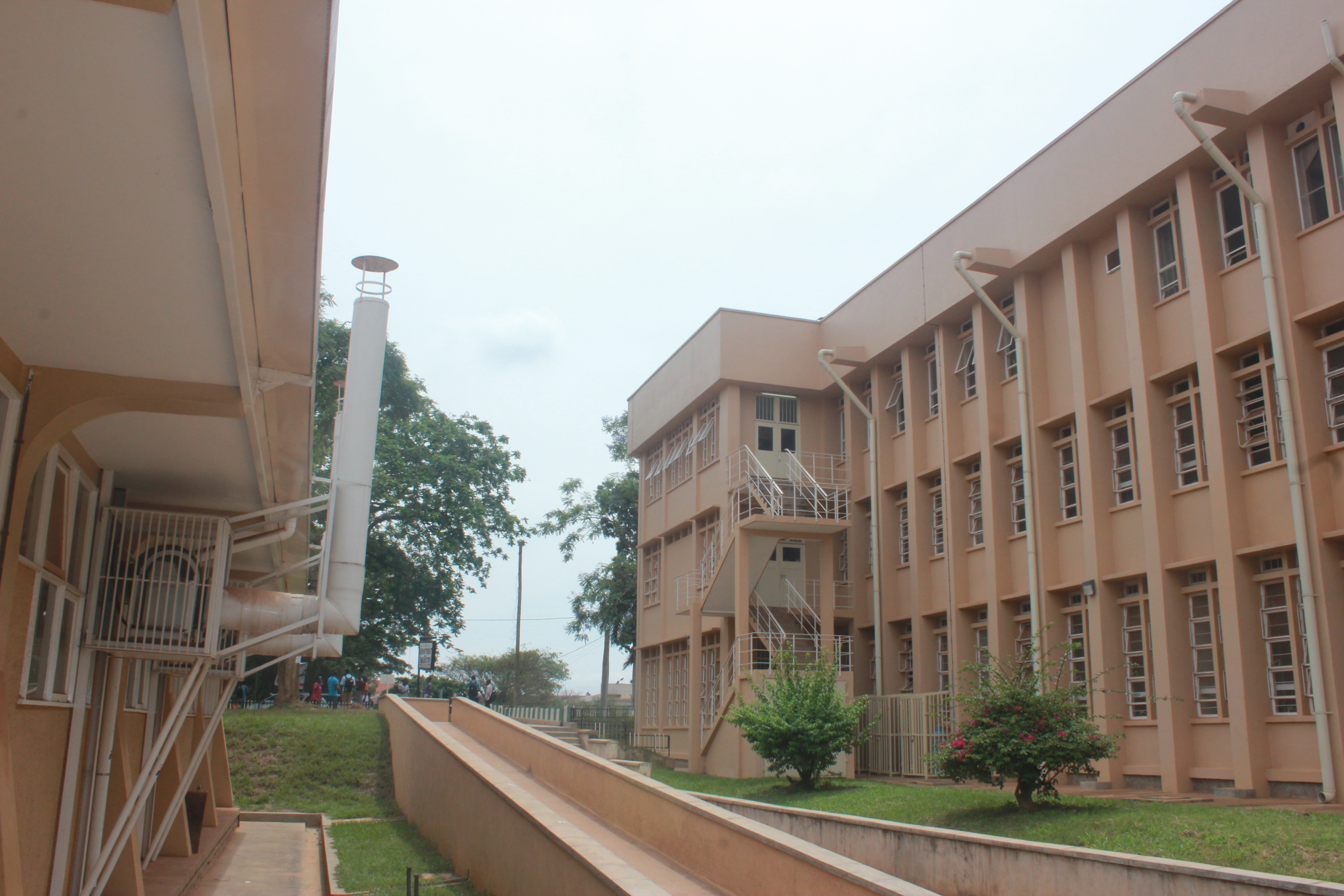
Department of Chemistry

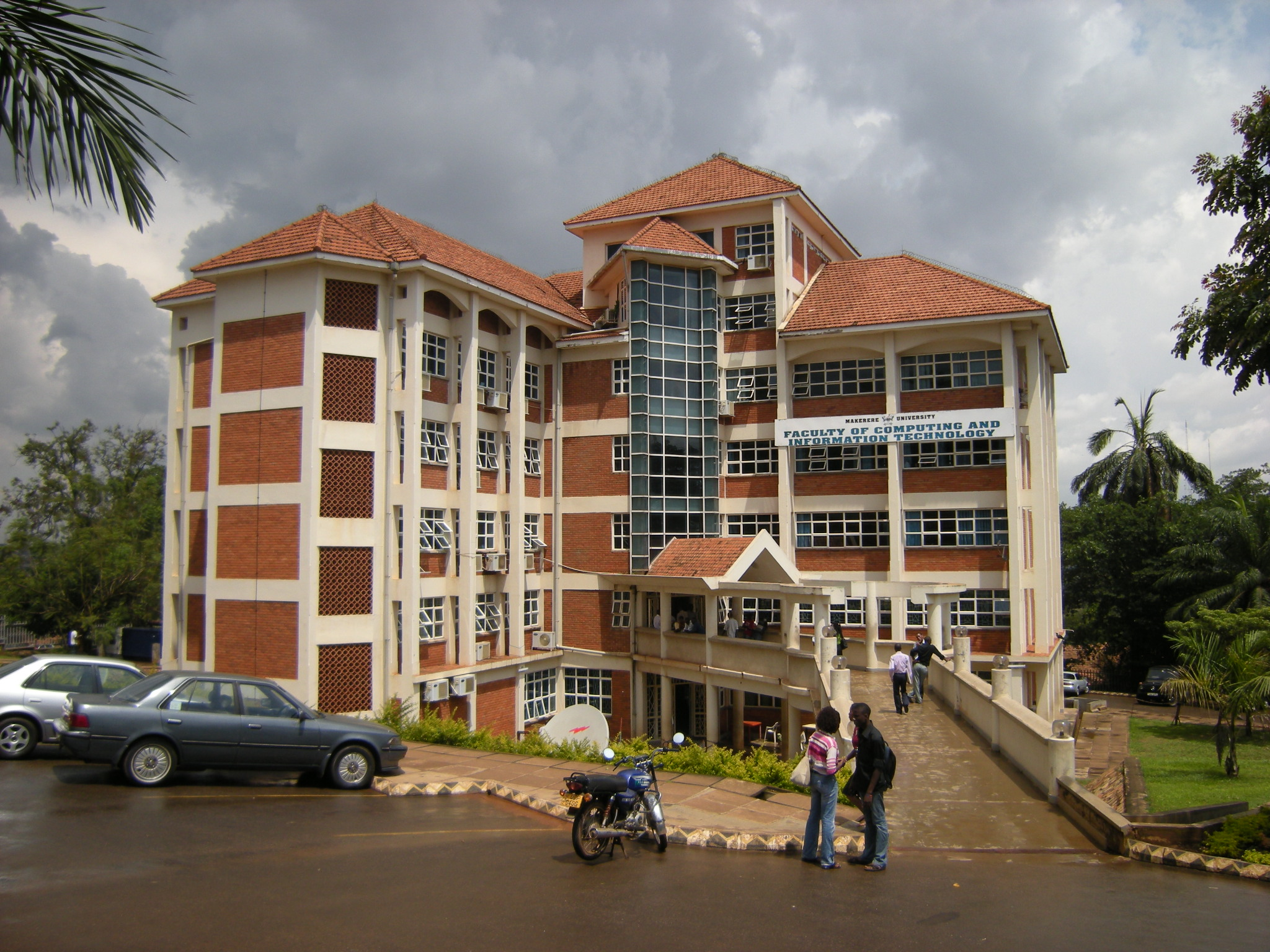
Faculty of Information Technology Building

=== Founding of the technical school ===
The trade school that became Makerere University began operating in 1921 with the first classes in carpentry, building construction and mechanics. In 1922, it was founded as the "Uganda Technical College" with additional courses in the arts, education, agriculture and medicine. That same year it was again renamed as Makerere College. In 1928, the vocational classes were separated from the college and renamed Kampala Technical School. In 1937 the college began offering post-secondary education certificate courses. These courses were as yet awarding diplomas, not full degrees.

=== University ===
The Asquith Commission - established by the British Government in 1943 and reporting in 1945 - considered the future of tertiary level education throughout the British Empire, and made recommendations for the development of new or upgraded institutions in a number of British colonial territories. Among these was Makerere. The Commission noted that there had been moves to upgrade the College starting in 1937, but that these had been delayed by the World War, and by 1943 the student roll was still modest, with 114 resident and 24 in associated schools.The Commission's final report strongly supported the raising of Makerere to full university level, while cautioning that granting the Empire's various new colleges full degree-giving powers before they were ready would be counter-productive, as the qualifications would not be respected elsewhere.

In 1943, the British protectorate government had proposed the university, which led to a controversial struggle. It was described as "a plot to steal African soil for European settlement," by the Bataka Party. In response to this campaign, there was rioting in the capital of Kampala.

In 1949, Makerere College was granted university status and its name became Makerere College, University of East Africa. In the same year, the Bataka Party had been banned by the British Protectorate government, because of acts of riot and arson committed after a Bataka protest gathering.

=== Wildlife field studies ===
Makere University has been cited as playing a "crucial" role in the development of primatology, particularly field studies. Researchers such as Niels Bolwing, Alexander John Haddow, Vernon Reynolds, Alison Jolly, and Thelma Rowell studied and conducted research through the university. Makerere helped bridge medical tropical research on human diseases such as Yellow Fever to field studies.

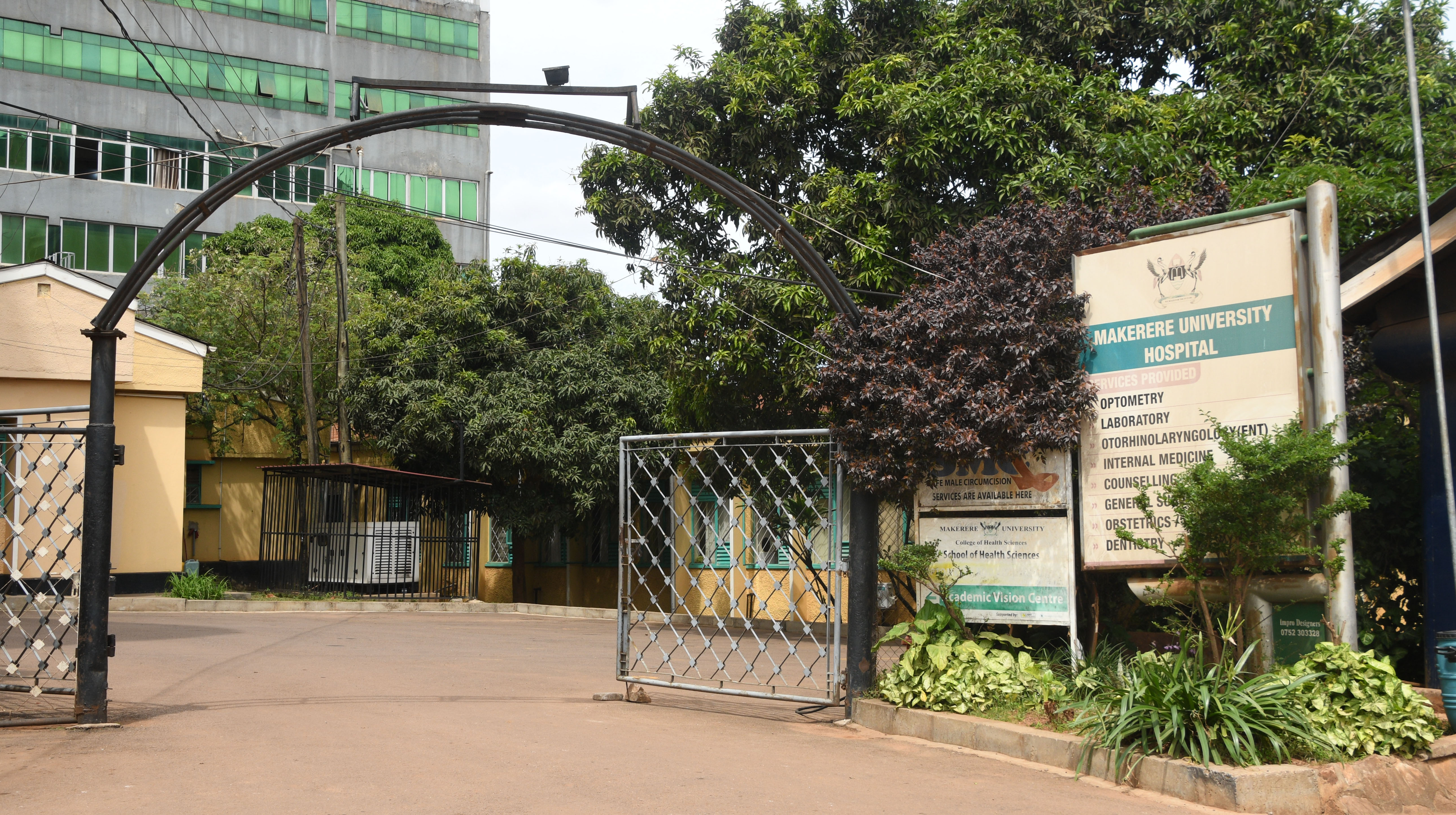
Makerere University Hospital 3

=== Unrest in the 2000s ===
The university was closed three times between 2006 and 2016.

Beginning on 1 August 2016, the non-teaching staff went on strike demanding back pay. The strike lasted three weeks and the government agreed to pay them by the end of October; however, the government failed to make the payment. This was but one more broken promise in a cycle of failed promises, strikes and more promises. That strike was followed by a strike of the lecturers over unpaid incentive pay, and that strike was joined by students in solidarity. This led to President Yoweri Museveni closing the university "indefinitely". Additional protests, including from parents whose children were left hanging in mid-semester, led to Museveni appointing a special commission to try to rectify the situation but with no promises of reopening. The commission's report was due in late February 2017. The University was actually closed for two months.

On 20 September 2020, the main building of Makerere University (the Ivory Tower) was severely damaged by fire, allegedly following a probe by the Ugandan parliament into financial mismanagement by university authorities.

=== 100-year anniversary ===
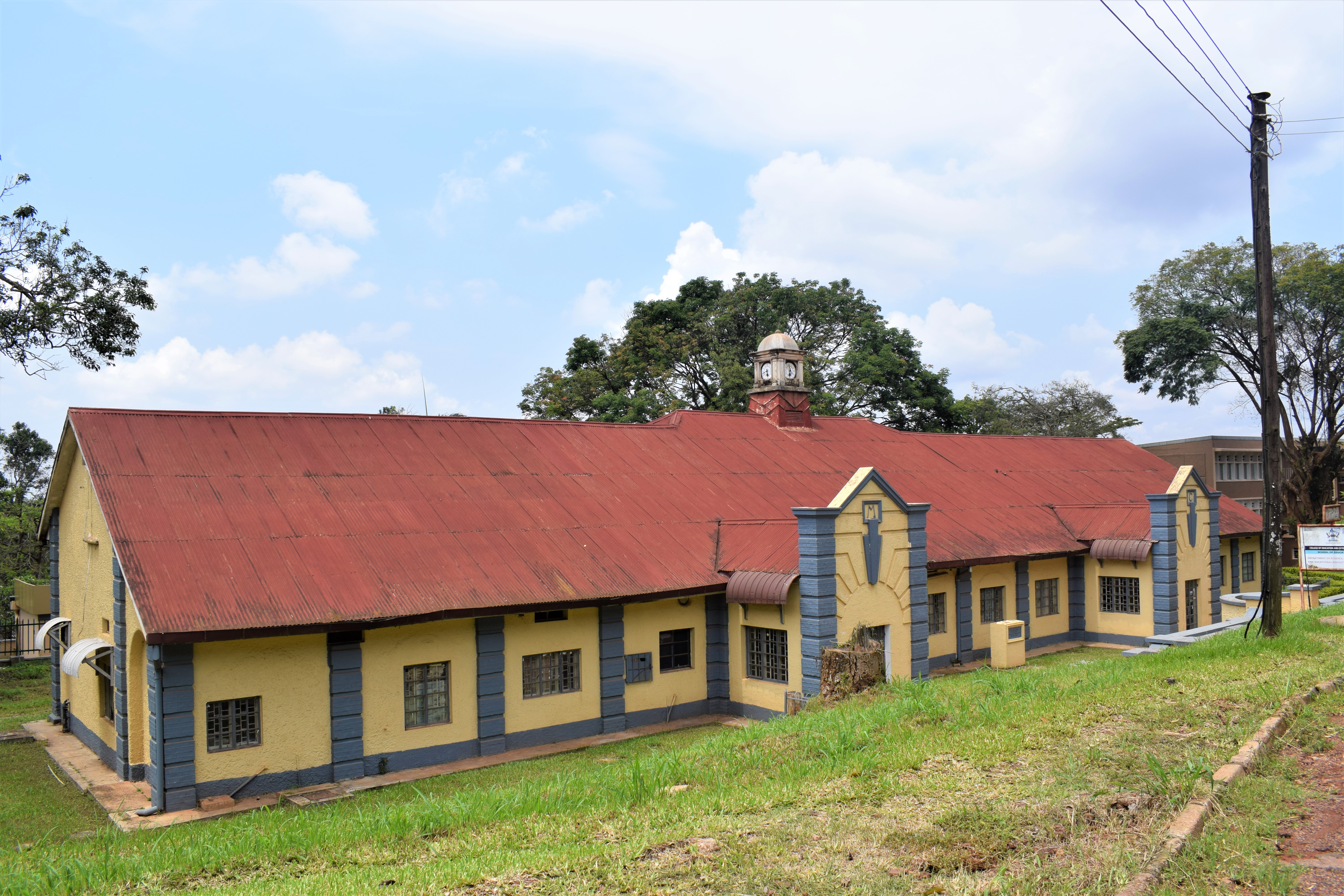
Makerere University's first administrative building

In 2022, the university celebrated its centenary since its establishment as Makerere College in 1922. The institution was granted additional land for expansion into a university by Nsibirwa, a former prime minister of the Buganda Kingdom, in 1945. Despite facing numerous challenges in Uganda's political, social, and academic history, the institution has persevered for a century.

On October 7, 2022, a ceremony commemorating the centenary was held at Freedom Square, with Ugandan President Yoweri Museveni in attendance. A statue monument was unveiled at the entrance of the university's Freedom Square to mark this significant milestone in Uganda's educational sector.

University rankings

Global – Overall
- CWUR World: 923 (2020-2021)
- CWTS World: 1159 (2020)
- QS World: 951–1000 (2024)
- THE World: 801–1000 (2024)
- USNWR Global: =757 (2023)

Regional – Overall
- THE Africa: =5 (2021)
- USNWR Africa: 14 (2021)

National – Overall
- CWTS National: 1 (2020)
- CWUR National: 1 (2020-21)
- THE National: 1 (2021)

== Colleges ==
Makerere University is composed of nine colleges and one school, offering programmes for about 36,000 undergraduates and 4,000 postgraduates.

The colleges include the following:

- College of Natural Sciences (CONAS)
- College of Health Sciences (CHS)
- College of Engineering Art & Design (CEDAT)
- College of Agriculture and Environmental Studies (CAES)
- College Of Business and Management Sciences (CoBAMS)
- College of Humanities & Social Sciences (CHUSS)
- College of Computing and Information Sciences (COCIS)
- College of Veterinary Medicine, Animal Resources & Bio-security (COVAB)
- College of Education and External Studies (CEES)

Additionally, there is the Makerere University Business School (MUBS).

== Organization ==
The University Council is the supreme governing body of the university while the Senate is the chief academic organ of the university.

=== Subcommittees of the University Council ===
- Appointments Board
- Finance, Planning and Administration
- Quality Assurance, Gender and ICT
- Estates and Works
- Staff Development, Welfare and Retirement Benefits
- Students Affairs and Disciplinary
- Honorary Awards
- Audit

== Notable former and current faculty administrators ==
- Venansius Baryamureeba, computer scientist, former vice chancellor
- Brian Semujju, Ugandan journalist, media theorist and senior lecturer in journalism and communication
- William Bazeyo, former dean of Makerere University School of Public Health (2009–2017); deputy vice chancellor of Makerere University, responsible for finance and administration, since September 2017
- Winnie Byanyima, aeronautical engineer, politician, activist
- Hugh Dinwiddy, lecturer in literature, warden of Northcote Hall
- George Kirya, microbiologist, diplomat, academic, former vice chancellor at Makerere and former chairman of Uganda Health Services Commission
- Mahmood Mamdani, political scientist and historian
- Harriet Mayanja-Kizza, former dean of students, Makerere University School of Medicine
- Ali Mazrui, academic, historian and political scientist
- Barnabas Nawangwe, architect, academic and current vice chancellor
- Apolo Nsibambi, former prime minister of Uganda and former chancellor of Makerere University
- Julius Kambarage Nyerere, Bachelor of Arts in Economics, first president of the United Republic of Tanzania
- Joe Oloka-Onyango, former dean of law and human rights expert
- Okot p'Bitek, poet
- David Serwadda, former dean, School of Public Health
- Nelson Sewankambo, former principal, College of Health Sciences
- John Ssebuwufu, chemist, former vice chancellor of Makerere University, current chancellor of Kyambogo University
- John Ddumba Ssentamu, economist, academic and banker, former vice chancellor
- Jones Kyazze, author, academic, former member of the Guild Council, Makerere's student government.
- Sylvia Tamale, lawyer, academic, women's rights activist
- Ngũgĩ wa Thiong'o, novelist
- Timothy Wangusa, author, poet, former minister of education
- David Wasawo, zoologist and educationist, former vice principal

== Other academics ==
- Catherine Abbo, medical doctor and researcher
- Paul D'Arbela, physician, cardiologist, academic; dean of the Mother Kevin Postgraduate Medical School, Nsambya
- Rose Mbowa, theatre academic, playwright and actress; former head of Department of Music, Dance and Drama
- Celestino Obua, physician, pharmacologist, academic; former vice chancellor of Mbarara University
- Charles Olweny, physician, oncologist, medical researcher; former vice chancellor of Uganda Martyrs University; former chancellor of Mbarara University
- Raphael Owor, medical doctor, former chancellor of Mbarara University, former professor of pathology at Makerere University School of Medicine
- Hakim Sendagire, physician, biochemist and microbiologist; dean of Habib Medical School

== Notable alumni ==
=== Political figures and government employees ===
- Lucy Akello, Ugandan politician, elected member of parliament for the Amuru District Women's Constituency, in the 10th Parliament
- Anita Annet Among, speaker of the 11th Parliament of Uganda (2021–2026); deputy speaker 2021–2022
- Samuel Awich (1973), justice of the Supreme Court of Belize
- Aisha Naluzze Batala, Ugandan lawyer and judge
- Kizza Besigye, physician, retired colonel in the Uganda People's Defence Force; opposition politician; former leader of the Forum for Democratic Change party; presidential candidate in 2001, 2006, and 2011
- Godfrey Binaisa, former president of Uganda
- Gilbert Bukenya, former vice president of Uganda
- Dora Byamukama, former member of parliament for Mwenge South, former member of the East African Legislative Assembly
- Kanyama Chiume, Malawian who worked for the independence of Nyasaland (now Malawi)
- Moses Ebuk, physician, neurophyiologist, former lecturer and tutor in the department of physiology at the Makerere University College of Health Sciences, diplomat; ambassador of Uganda to the Russian Federation
- Daphrosa Gahakwa, Rwandan education minister
- Aloisea Inyumba, Rwandan minister for gender and family promotion
- Filemona F. Indire, former Kenyan ambassador, leading educator and member of parliament
- Joseph Kabila, Congolese politician and president of the Democratic Republic of the Congo
- Paul Kagame, president of Rwanda
- Allen Kagina, public administrator
- Patrick Karegeya, former Rwandan head of intelligence
- Andrew Felix Kaweesi, assistant inspector general of police (AIGP) Uganda, military officer and policeman; spokesperson of Uganda Police Force, 2016–2017
- Specioza Kazibwe, former vice president of Uganda
- Mwai Kibaki, third president of Kenya, 2002–2013; graduated at the top of his class (summa cum laude) in 1955 with a Bachelor of Arts in economics
- Samson Kisekka, former vice president of Uganda
- Benedicto Kiwanuka, first prime minister and first chief justice of Uganda
- Crispus Kiyonga, physician, former minister of defense of Uganda; chancellor of Makerere University since 2024
- Sam Kutesa, Uganda's foreign affairs minister; president of the 69th session of the United Nations General Assembly
- Henry Kyemba, minister of health under Idi Amin
- Catherine Kyobutungi, executive director of the African Population and Health Research Center
- Peter Lokeris, Ugandan cabinet member from 2009 to 2026 and member of parliament since 1996
- Erias Lukwago, lawyer, former Lord Mayor of Kampala City
- Yusuf Lule, former president of Uganda
- Norbert Mao, former guild president of Makerere University and current president of Democratic Party
- Amama Mbabazi, former secretary general of the National Resistance Movement and former prime minister of Uganda
- Benjamin Mkapa, former Tanzanian politician and former president of Tanzania
- Jennifer Musisi, lawyer and public administrator
- Shamim Nambassa, former guild president of Makerere University and Woman Lord Councilor LC5 elect for Kawempe South
- Jehoash Mayanja Nkangi, government minister and former Katikkiro of Buganda (1964–1966, 1993–1994)
- Apolo Nsibambi, former prime minister of Uganda and former chancellor of Makerere University
- Kayumba Nyamwasa, former Rwandan Army chief of staff and ambassador to India
- Stella Nyanzi, human rights activist
- Julius Nyerere, Tanzanian politician and the first president of Tanzania
- Milton Obote, two-time former president of Uganda
- Anthony Ochaya, Ugandan Minister of Planning and Economic Development under the UNLF regime, World Bank official
- Oginga Odinga, Kenyan politician, first vice president of Kenya
- Joe Powell, Labour party MP, UK
- Ruhakana Rugunda, former prime minister of Uganda, physician, and former permanent representative of Uganda to the United Nations
- Emmanuel Tumusiime-Mutebile, former governor, Bank of Uganda
- Bobi Wine (Robert Kyagulanyi Ssentamu), Ugandan politician, businessman, entrepreneur, philanthropist, musician, freedom fighter and actor
- Jane Aceng, government chief whip, woman member of parliament, former Minister of Health
- Kituuma Rusoke, public relations officer and spokesperson for Uganda Police Force.

=== Film, television and radio ===
- Akite Agnes, Ugandan comedian and actress
- Lanie Banks, Canadian-Ugandan rapper, songwriter and community activist
- Hannington Bugingo, Ugandan comedian and actor
- Anne Kansiime, Ugandan comedian and actress
- Cleopatra Koheirwe, Ugandan actress, singer and media personality
- Teacher Mpamire, aka Herbert Mendo Ssegujja, Ugandan comedian and actor
- Morris Mugisha, actor, producer and director
- Alex Muhangi, Ugandan comedian and actor
- Housen Mushema, Ugandan actor and model
- Leila Nakabira, actress and screenwriter
- Rehema Nanfuka, Ugandan actress, director and producer
- Crystal Newman, Ugandan media personality, MC and motivational speaker
- Simon Kaggwa Njala, Ugandan journalist and media personality
- Gladys Oyenbot, Ugandan actress and producer
- Mowzey Radio, aka Moses Nakintije Ssekibogo, Ugandan singer

=== Sports people ===
- Moses Muhangi, president of Uganda Boxing Federation
- Henry Osinde, Ugandan born cricketer, currently Canadian fast bowler

=== Writers and journalists ===
- Christopher Henry Muwanga Barlow
- Jane Kaberuka, novelist
- Daniel Kalinaki, journalist
- Barbie Kyagulanyi, writer and activist
- Micere Githae Mugo, Kenyan novelist, poet, activist
- John Nagenda, writer, political commentator and adviser to the president of Uganda, Yoweri Museveni
- Peter Nazareth, author, critic
- Michael Nsimbi, "father of Ganda literature"
- Okello Oculi, author, poet
- Charles Onyango-Obbo, journalist and political commentator
- Mark Ouma, athletics journalist and former philosophy lecturer at Makerere
- David Rubadiri, poet, novelist, diplomat
- Newton Isaac, author & entrepreneur
- Ngũgĩ wa Thiong'o, Kenyan novelist
- Hilda Twongyeirwe, editor, poet, short story writer
- Timothy Wangusa, author, poet, former minister of education
- Elvania Namukwaya Zirimu, poet and dramatist

=== Scientists ===
- Andrew Kambugu, physician, Sande-McKinnell executive director at the Uganda Infectious Disease Institute
- Robert Kezaala, physician, senior health advisor at UNICEF
- John William Kibukamusoke, medical academic and researcher, and one-time personal physician to Idi Amin
- Matthew Lukwiya, physician in Gulu during the 2000 Ebola outbreak
- Rose Nakasi, computer scientist
- Etheldreda Nakimuli-Mpungu, psychiatrist and epidemiologist
- Christine Obbo, socio-cultural anthropologist
- Joshua Sikhu Okonya, agronomist and entomologist.
- Thereza Piloya, pediatrician and medical academic, specializing in pediatric endocrinology and HIV/AIDS
- Jane Aceng, pediatrician during Covid-19
- Annet Karabo, researcher at the Vanderbilt University Medical Center
- Lynnette Tumwine Kyokunda, pathologist

=== Others ===
- Iddah Asin, lawyer and Johnson & Johnson executive
- Nkulanga Enock, children's rights activist
- Busingye Kabumba, poet, lawyer and lecturer at law
- Laeticia Kikonyogo, lawyer and judge
- Betty Manyolo, artist
- Patrick Mazimhaka, deputy chairperson of the African Union's African Commission
- Yvonne Mpambara, lawyer and politician
- Andrew Mwenda, managing director of the Independent newspaper in Uganda
- Lilian Mary Nabulime, sculptor
- Katherine Namuddu, educationist, academician, researcher, author and advisor on African higher education
- Harry Nkumbula, leader during Zambia's struggle for independence
- Aloikin Praise Opoloje, anti-corruption activist
- Olara Otunnu, former United Nations under-secretary general and special representative for children and armed conflict
- John Sentamu, Anglican archbishop of York, England, first black archbishop of the Church of England
- Martin Ssempa, controversial Ugandan pastor and AIDS activist
- Hannah Karema Tumukunde, miss Uganda 2023/24

== Halls of residence ==
As of September 2015, the halls of residence at Makerere University included the following:

=== For men ===
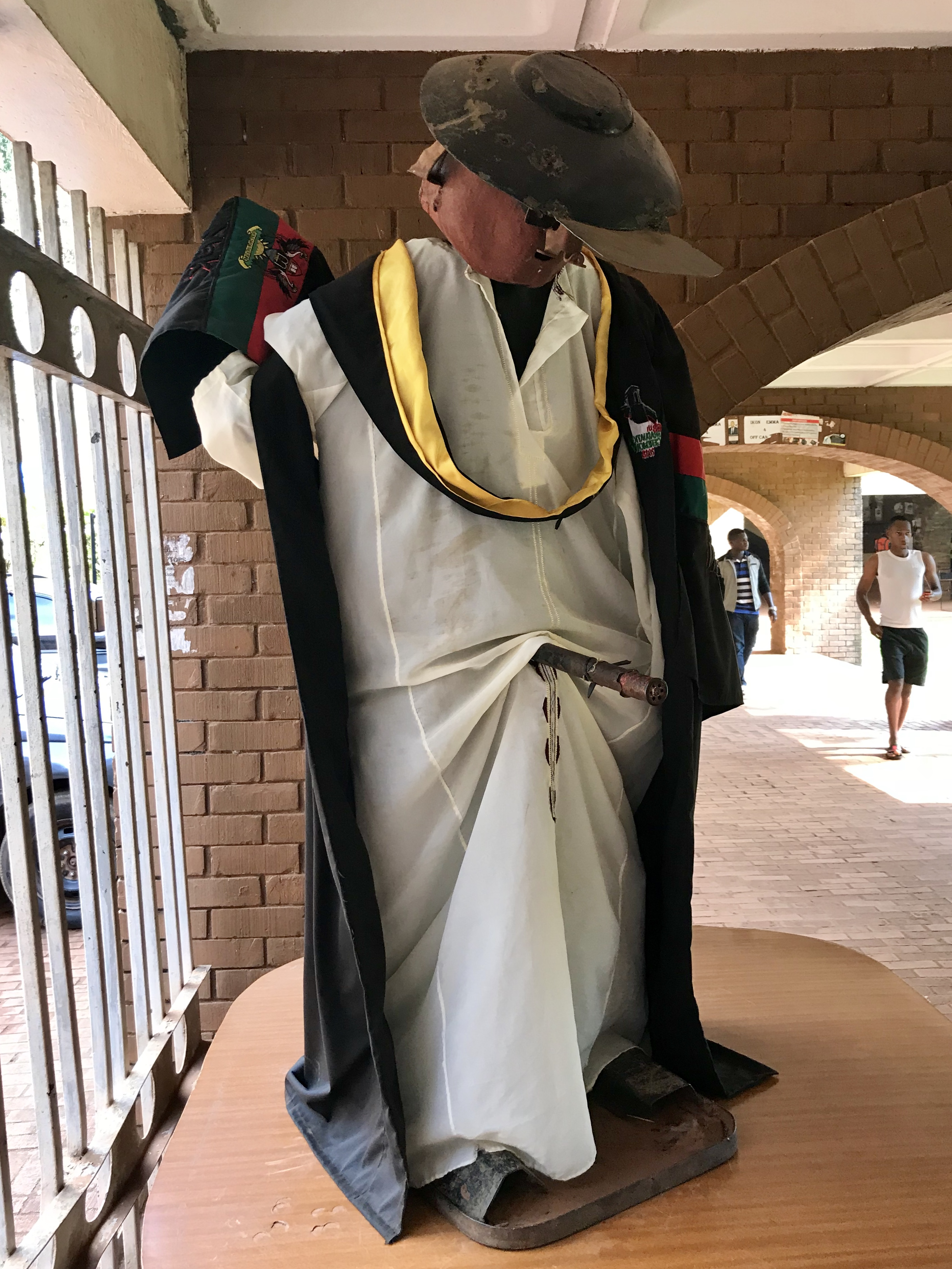
The Gongom monument at Lumumba Hall

- Livingstone Hall
- Lumumba Hall (defunct 2022)
- Mitchell Hall
- Nkrumah Hall
- Nsibirwa Hall
- University Hall

=== For women ===
- Africa Hall
- Mary Stuart Hall
- Complex Hall

=== For students of medicine in their final years ===
- Galloway House

=== Postgraduate Hall ===
- Dag Hammarskjöld Hostel

== Upcountry campuses ==
In January 2010, the university announced the opening of two new campuses, one in the city of Fort Portal, approximately 310 kilometres (190 mi), by road, west of Kampala, and another one in the city of Jinja, approximately 85 kilometres (53 mi), by road, east of Kampala. The following courses are offered at the upcountry campuses:

=== Eastern Campus, Jinja ===
- Bachelor of Science in Computer Science
- Bachelor of Information Technology
- Bachelor of Development Studies
- Bachelor of Tourism

== Replacement of main building ==
In September 2020, a fire gutted the Main Building of Makerere University, destroying university records and the building structure. A subsequent investigation by an eleven-person team could not establish a definite cause of the fire, but pointed to an electric fault as a likely cause.

In August 2021, the Cabinet of Uganda resolved to break down what remained of the Main Building after the fire. A new building, which will be designed to look like the original structure, will be erected at the same location, at a budgeted cost of UGX:21 billion (approx. US$6 million).

The engineering, procurement and construction (EPC) contract was awarded to Excel Construction Company Limited, a Ugandan company and a subsidiary of the Madhvani Group. The reconstruction process began in April 2022, starting with tearing down the structurally unsound original building, built in the 1930s and commissioned in 1941.

== See also ==
- African Geographical Review
- African Writers Conference
- East African Geographical Review
- List of universities in Uganda
- Makerere College School
- Makerere University College of Health Sciences
- Student movements in Uganda
- Islamic University In Uganda
- Makerere University Business School
- East African School of Library and Information Science
