= Venansius Baryamureeba =

Ugandan computer scientist and academic administrator

- Born: 18 May 1969 (age 57); Ibanda District, Uganda
- Citizenship: Uganda
- Education: Makerere University (Bachelor of Science); University of Bergen (Master of Science), (Doctor of Philosophy); University of Trondheim (Diploma in Computer Program Analysis)
- Occupations: Computer Scientist, academic, academic administrator
- Years active: 2001 — present
- Known for: Academics and academic Administration

Venansius Baryamureeba (born 18 May 1969) is a Ugandan mathematician, computer scientist, academic, and academic administrator. He was the Acting vice chancellor of the Uganda Technology and Management University, a private university in Uganda, from September 2013 until 28 September 2015. He left the position to join the presidential race in Uganda to take place in 2016. Before that, he served as the vice chancellor of Makerere University from November 2009 until August 2012.

== Background and education ==
He was born in Kasharara Village, Kagongo Parish, Ibanda District, in the Western Region of Uganda. He holds a Bachelor of Science in mathematics, obtained in 1994 from Makerere University. He also holds a Master of Science and a Doctor of Philosophy, both in computer science and both from Bergen University in Norway, awarded in 1996 and in 2000, respectively. In 1997, he was awarded the postgraduate Diploma in the Analysis of Linear Programming Models by the University of Trondheim, also in Norway.

== Career ==
His career in academia began soon after his first degree, when he worked as a teaching assistant in the Institute of Statistics and Applied Economics at Makerere University, from 1994 until 1998. He then worked as an assistant lecturer at the Institute of Teacher Education Kyambogo, which now is part of Kyambogo University, from 1995 until 1996. While pursuing graduate study in Norway, he worked as a teaching assistant in the Department of Informatics at Bergen University from 1997 until 2000. He also worked as a research fellow, in the same department and institution, from 1995 until 2000.

Beginning in 1998 until 2000, he worked as a lecturer in the Department of Mathematics at Makerere University. He was a senior lecturer in the Institute of Computer Science at Makerere University, from 2001 until 2006 (which was transformed into the Department of Computer Science, Faculty of Computing and IT (FCI)). He then became an associate professor, and, in November 2006, he was made a professor, continuing to teach until August 2012 at FCI. From October 2005 until June 2010, he served as the dean of FCI.

From November 2009 until August 2012, he was vice chancellor of Makerere University.

At Uganda Technology and Management University, he has served since September 2012 as the vice chancellor and as a professor of computer science in the School of Computing and Engineering.

== Works ==
- The enhanced digital investigation process model
- Extraction of interesting association rules using genetic algorithms
- Cyber crime in Uganda: Myth or reality?
- The role of ICTs and their sustainability in developing countries
- Mining High Quality Association Rules Using Genetic Algorithms.
- Optimized association rule mining with genetic algorithms
- ICT as an engine for Uganda's economic growth: The role of and opportunities for Makerere University
- ICT-enabled services: a critical analysis of the opportunities and challenges in Uganda
- Towards domain independent named entity recognition
- Baryamureeba, Venansius; Steihaug, Trond; Zhang, Yin (April 1999). Properties of A Class of Preconditioners for Weighted Least Squares Problems (Report). hdl:1911/101921.
- Kitoogo, Fredrick Edward; Baryamureeba, Venansius (2007). A methodology for feature selection in named entity recognition. Fountain Publishers Kampala. hdl:10570/702. ISBN 978-9970-02-730-9.
- Baryamureeba, Venansius; Steihaug, Trond (2006). "On the Convergence of an Inexact Primal-Dual Interior Point Method for Linear Programming". Large-Scale Scientific Computing. Lecture Notes in Computer Science. Vol. 3743. pp. 629–637. doi:10.1007/11666806_72. ISBN 978-3-540-31994-8.
- Lowu, Francis; Baryamureeba, Venansius (2006). "On Efficient Distribution of Data in Multicast Networks: QoS in Scalable Networks". Large-Scale Scientific Computing. Lecture Notes in Computer Science. Vol. 3743. pp. 518–525. doi:10.1007/11666806_59. ISBN 978-3-540-31994-8.
- Baryamureeba, Venansius (March 2002). "Solution of large-scale weighted least-squares problems". Numerical Linear Algebra with Applications. 9 (2): 93–106. CiteSeerX 10.1.1.33.6217. doi:10.1002/nla.232. S2CID 18869972.
- Computational issues for a new class of preconditioners
- Mwebesa, Theodora Mondo T.; Baryamureeba, Venansius; Williams, Ddembe (2007). "Collaborative framework for supporting indigenous knowledge management". Proceedings of the ACM first Ph.D. Workshop in CIKM on - PIKM '07. p. 163. doi:10.1145/1316874.1316900. ISBN 978-1-59593-832-9. S2CID 14753623.
- The role of TVET in building regional economies
- Computer forensics for cyberspace crimes
- On the properties of preconditioners for robust linear regression
- On a class of preconditioners for interior point methods
- Wakabi-Waiswa, Peter P.; Baryamureeba, Venansius; Sarukesi, K. (2008). "Generalized association rule mining using genetic algorithms" (Document). Fountain Publisher Kampala. hdl:10570/1901.
- Logit analysis of socioeconomic factors influencing famine in Uganda.
- Solution of robust linear regression problems by preconditioned conjugate gradient type methods
- Baryamureeba, Venansius; Steihaug, Trond (1999). Properties and computational issues of a preconditioner for interior point methods. Dept. of Informatics, University of Bergen. OCLC 692263578.
- Baryamureeba, Venansius; Steihaug, Trond; Zhang, Yin (1999). Properties of A Class of Preconditioners for Weighted Least Squares Problems (Report). hdl:1911/101921.
- A new function for robust linear regression: An iterative approach
- Approaches towards effective knowledge management for small and medium enterprises in developing countries-Uganda
- Tushabe, Florence; Baryamureeba, Venansius; Bagyenda, Paul; Ogwang, Cyprian; Jehopio, Peter (2008). "The Status of Software Usability in Uganda". In Aisbett, Janet; Gibbon, Greg; Rodrigues, Anthony J.; Migga, Joseph Kizza; Nath, Ravi; Renardel, Gerald R (eds.). Strengthening the Role of ICT in Development. pp. 1–11. CiteSeerX 10.1.1.940.489.
- Baryamureeba, Venansius (1 December 2001). "The Impact of Equal Weighting of Low- and High-Confidence Observations on Robust Linear Regression Computations". BIT Numerical Mathematics. 41 (5): 847–855. doi:10.1023/A:1021912522498. ISSN 1572-9125. S2CID 118054436.
- Williams, Ddembe; Baryamureeba, Venansius, eds. (2006). Measuring Computing Research Excellence and Vitality. CiteSeerX 10.1.1.615.8916. ISBN 978-9970-02-592-3.
- Baryamureeba, Venansius; Steihaug, Trond; Zhang, Yin (1999). "Application of a Class of Preconditioners to Large Scale Linear Programming Problems". Euro-Par'99 Parallel Processing. Lecture Notes in Computer Science. Vol. 1685. pp. 1044–1048. doi:10.1007/3-540-48311-X_146. ISBN 978-3-540-66443-7.
- Kitoogo, Fredrick Edward; Baryamureeba, Venansius. "Meta-Knowledge as an engine in Classifier Combination". International Journal of Computing and ICT Research. 1 (2): 74–86. CiteSeerX 10.1.1.133.1815.
- Baryamureeba, Venansius (2004). "Solution of Robust Linear Regression Problems by Krylov Subspace Methods". Large-Scale Scientific Computing. Lecture Notes in Computer Science. Vol. 2907. pp. 67–75. doi:10.1007/978-3-540-24588-9_6. ISBN 978-3-540-21090-0.
- Tushabe, Florence; Venansius, Baryamureeba; Katushemererwe, Frida. "Translation of the Google Interface into Runyakitara" (PDF). Makerere University. S2CID 210706862.
- The role of academia in fostering private sector competitiveness in ICT development
- Angyeyo, Jennifer S.; Baryamureeba, Venansius; Jehopio, Peter (2006). "A Dynamic Framework for the Protection of Intellectual Property Rights in the Cyberspace". In Williams, Ddembe; Baryamureeba, Venansius (eds.). Measuring Computing Research Excellence and Vitality. pp. 228–245. CiteSeerX 10.1.1.615.8916. ISBN 978-9970-02-592-3.

== See also ==
- Education in Uganda
- Ugandan university leaders
- List of universities in Uganda
- Makerere University
