= List of Ugandan women writers =

This is a list of Ugandan women writers, including writers either from or associated with Uganda.

== A ==
- Judith Adong (living)
- Grace Akello (born 1950)
- Regina Amollo (born c. 1954)
- Harriet Anena
- Lillian Aujo

== B ==
- Doreen Baingana (born 1966)
- Evangeline Barongo
- Violet Barungi (born 1943)
- Mildred Barya
- Jackee Budesta Batanda

== E ==
- Angella Emurwon

== G ==
- Asiimwe Deborah GKashugi

== H ==
- Jessica Horn (born 1979)

== K ==
- Jane Kaberuka (born 1956)
- Barbara Kaija (born 1964)
- Nyana Kakoma
- Keturah Kamugasa (died 2017)
- Catherine Samali Kavuma (born 1960)
- China Keitetsi (born 1976)
- Susan Nalugwa Kiguli (born 1969)
- Barbara Kimenye (1929–2012)
- Goretti Kyomuhendo (born 1965)

== L ==
- Beatrice Lamwaka

== M ==
- Jennifer Nansubuga Makumbi
- Irshad Manji (born 1968)
- Rose Mbowa (1943–1999)

== N ==
- Rose Namayanja (born 1975)
- Beverley Nambozo
- Glaydah Namukasa
- Victoria Nalongo Namusisi (born 1956)
- Philippa Namutebi Kabali-Kagwa (born 1964)
- Monica Arac de Nyeko (born 1979)

== O ==
- Otoniya J. Okot Bitek (born 1966)
- Mary Karooro Okurut (born 1954)

== P ==
- Ife Piankhi

== R ==
- Rose Rwakasisi (born 1945)

== S ==
- Nakisanze Segawa

== T ==
- Lillian Tindyebwa
- Hilda Twongyeirwe

== W ==
- Ayeta Anne Wangusa (born 1971)
- Anne Nasimiyu Wasike (died 2018)

== Z ==
- Elvania Namukwaya Zirimu (1938–1979)

== See also ==
- List of women writers
- List of Ugandan women artists
