= List of Ugandan writers =

This is a list of noted Ugandan writers, born or raised in Uganda, whether living there or overseas, and writing in one of the languages of Uganda.

== A ==
- Abraham Luzzi (born 1982), businessman, politician, author on governance and leadership
- Adong Judith (born 1977), playwright
- Grace Akello (born 1950), poet, essayist, folklorist and politician
- Harriet Anena, short story writer, poet, journalist
- Apolo Kagwa (1864–1927), prime minister of Buganda
- Monica Arac de Nyeko (born 1979), short story writer, poet and essayist
- Asiimwe Deborah GKashugi, playwright
- Lillian Aujo, poet, short story writer

== B ==
- Doreen Baingana (born 1966), short story writer
- Bake Robert Tumuhaise (born 1981), novelist
- Evangeline Barongo, children's writer
- Violet Barungi (born 1943), novelist and editor
- Mildred Barya, poet
- Jackee Budesta Batanda, short story writer, novelist
- Austin Bukenya (born 1944), poet, literary theorist, actor and playwright^{[Gikandi & Mwangi]} ^{[Killam & Rowe]}
- Busingye Kabumba (born 1982), lawyer, poet
- Bwesigye bwa Mwesigire (born 1987), lawyer, poet, short story writer
- Ernest Bazanye, journalist, author

== D-K ==
- Hamis Kiggundu (born 1984), Investor, Entrepreneur, philanthropist, lawyer
- Dilman Dila (born 1977), novelist, short story writer, filmmaker
- Ivan Edwards, doctor, flight surgeon, minister, poet
- Angella Emurwon, playwright
- Arthur Gakwandi (born 1943), novelist, academic, short story writer
- Jessica horn-Uganda (born 1979), poet
- Ife Piankhi, poet
- Moses Isegawa (born 1963), novelist^{[Gikandi & Mwangi]}
- Kabubi Herman, poet
- Peter Kagayi, poet
- Kakwenza Rukirabashaija (born 1988), novelist
- Keturah Kamugasa (1967–2015), writer and journalist
- Catherine Samali Kavuma (born 1960), novelist
- China Keitetsi (born 1967), autobiographical writer
- Susan Nalugwa Kiguli (born 1969), poet, academic
- Barbara Kimenye (1929–2012), children's writer^{[Gikandi & Mwangi]} ^{[Killam & Rowe]}
- Wycliffe Kiyingi (1929–2014), playwright
- Henry Kyemba (1939–2023), politician and writer
- Goretti Kyomuhendo (born 1965), novelist
- Hope Keshubi (1961-1999), novelist

== L-M ==
- Beatrice Lamwaka, short story writer
- Bonnie Lubega (born 1929), novelist, children's writer and lexicographer^{[Gikandi & Mwangi]} ^{[Killam & Rowe]}
- Lubwa p'Chong (1946–1997), playwright. ^{[Killam & Rowe]}
- Jennifer Nansubuga Makumbi, poet, novelist, short story writer
- Irshad Manji (born 1968), author, professor and advocate
- Charles Mayiga (born 1962), lawyer, prime minister of Buganda (born 2013)
- Rose Mbowa (1943–1999), playwright, actress and educator
- Mutesa II of Buganda (1942–1969), Kabaka of Buganda
- Christopher Henry Muwanga Barlow (1929–2006), poet
- Mahmood Mamdani (born 1933), academic and political writer
- Patrick Mangeni, academic and writer
- Mulumba Ivan Matthias (born 1987), poet, short story writer, novelist

== N-O ==
- John Nagenda (1938–2023), writer and presidential adviser^{[Killam & Rowe]}
- Newton Isaac, author and entrepreneur
- Nakisanze Segawa, poet
- Beverley Nambozo, poet, short story writer
- Glaydha Namukasa, novelist
- Philippa Namutebi Kabali-Kagwa (born 1964), poet
- Peter Nazareth (born 1940), novelist, playwright, poet and critic^{[Gikandi & Mwangi]} ^{[Killam & Rowe]}
- Rajat Neogy (1938–1995), writer and editor^{[Gikandi & Mwangi]}
- Jason Ntaro, poet
- Richard Carl Ntiru (born 1946), poet^{[Gikandi & Mwangi]} ^{[Killam & Rowe]}
- Michael B. Nsimbi (1910–1994), Luganda writer
- Nyana Kakoma, short story writer
- Julius Ocwinyo (born 1961), editor, poet and novelist
- James Munange Ogoola (born 1945), poet, judge
- Okello Oculi (1942–2025), novelist, poet and academic^{[Killam & Rowe]}
- Okot p'Bitek (1931–1982), poet^{[Gikandi & Mwangi]} ^{[Killam & Rowe]}
- Mary Karooro Okurut (born 1954), novelist, academic, politician
- Charles Onyango-Obbo (born 1958), journalist

== R–Z ==
- John Ruganda (1941–2007), playwright
- Andrew Rugasira, author, businessman
- Rose Rwakasisi (born 1945), children's writer, short story writer
- Eneriko Seruma (born 1944), poet, novelist and short story writer^{[Gikandi & Mwangi]} ^{[Killam & Rowe]}
- Robert Serumaga (1939–1980), playwright, director and novelist^{[Gikandi & Mwangi]} ^{[Killam & Rowe]}
- Taban Lo Liyong (born 1939), Sudan-born poet and critic^{[Gikandi & Mwangi]} ^{[Killam & Rowe]}
- Bahadur Tejani (born 1942), Kenyan-born poet, dramatist and literary critic^{[Gikandi & Mwangi]} ^{[Killam & Rowe]}
- Lillian Tindyebwa, novelist, short story writer
- Tumusiime Rushedge (1941–2008), novelist, cartoonist, surgeon
- Nick Twinamatsiko, engineer, novelist, poet
- Hilda Twongyeirwe, editor, poet, short story writer
- Ayeta Anne Wangusa (born 1971), activist, novelist, short story writer
- Timothy Wangusa (born 1942),^{[Gikandi & Mwangi]}^{[Killam & Rowe]} poet, novelist
- Yoweri Museveni (born 1944), politician, president
- Samuel Iga Zinunula, poet
- Elvania Namukwaya Zirimu (1938–1979),^{[Gikandi & Mwangi]} poet, dramatist
- Pio Zirimu (died 1977), linguist and literary theorist^{[Gikandi & Mwangi]}

== See also ==
- List of African writers by country
