= Goretti Kyomuhendo =

Ugandan novelist and literary activist (born 1965)

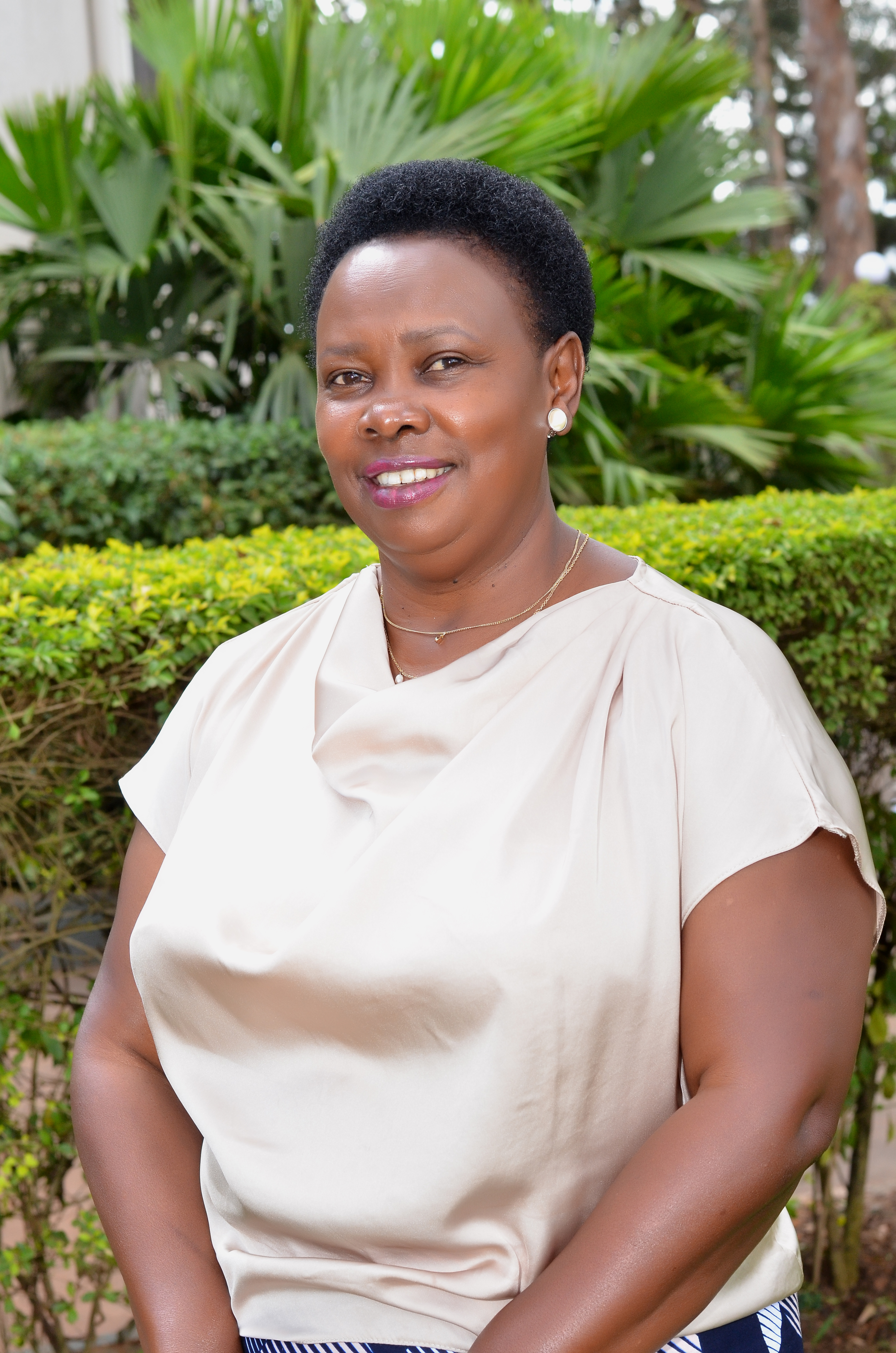
- Born: Maria Goretti Kyomuhendo; 1 August 1965 (age 61); Hoima, Uganda
- Education: University of Natal; University of KwaZulu-Natal
- Occupation: Writer
- Known for: Founder of African Writers Trust and Tubaze African Books; former Programmes Co-ordinator FEMRITE
- Notable work: The First Daughter (1996); Secrets No More (1999); Waiting (2007); Whispers From Vera (2023); Promises (2025)

Goretti Kyomuhendo is a Ugandan novelist and the founding director of the African Writers Trust and TUBAZE African Books. She is the author of five novels: The First Daughter (1996); Secrets No More (1999), which won the Uganda National Literary Award for Best Novel; Waiting (2007), published by The Feminist Press in New York and later translated into Spanish; Whispers from Vera (2023); and Promises (2025), published by Catalyst Press in the United States.

In 2014, she published The Essential Handbook for African Creative Writers. She has also written several children’s books and short stories.

Kyomuhendo holds a master's degree in Creative Writing from the University of KwaZulu-Natal in South Africa, where she also taught Creative Writing. She was the first Ugandan woman to receive an International Writing Program fellowship from the University of Iowa. Her work as a writer and literary activist has received international recognition. She has chaired the judging panel for the Caine Prize and served as a judge for the Commonwealth Book Prize.

In 2019, she was named one of the 100 Most Influential Africans by New African magazine.

She is one of the founding members of FEMRITE, the Uganda Women Writers Association, and served as its first director for ten years. She was the first Programmes Coordinator for FEMRITE—Uganda Women Writers Association, from 1997 to 2007. She also founded the African Writers Trust in 2009, after her relocation to London, Great Britain, in 2008.

== Education ==
Maria Goretti Kyomuhendo was born and raised in Hoima, a city in Western Uganda. She obtained a Bachelor of Arts degree (Hons) in English Studies (2003) from the University of Natal, Durban, South Africa, and a Master of Arts degree in Creative Writing (2005) from the University of KwaZulu-Natal in Durban. In 2003, Kyomuhendo was awarded a Graduate Scholarship for academic excellence by the University of KwaZulu-Natal. She was the first Ugandan woman writer to be declared an Honorary Fellow in Writing at the University of Iowa, in 1997 after participating in the International Writing Program of Iowa.

== Writing and critical reception ==
Kyomuhendo's first novel, The First Daughter (published in 1996), was well received in Uganda, earning some regional (East African) attention as well. Her second novel, Secrets No More (1999), won the National Book Trust of Uganda Award for 1999.

Kyomuhendo's third novel, Waiting: A Novel of Uganda's Hidden War (2007), has garnered the most international recognition to date. Publishers Weekly described it as "a sensitive, slowly unraveling observation of daily life in a remote Ugandan village as Amin's marauding soldiers approach on their retreat north." A reviewer for BookLoons praised Waiting as "a complex and disturbing story told with almost a touch of sweetness to it, through the eyes of a young girl forced to grow up before her time." Kirkus Reviews, the New Statesman, Pambazuka News, and the Mail & Guardian Online (South Africa) were among other publications that also gave favourable notice.

In March 2009, the Poetry Café in Covent Garden, London, featured Kyomuhendo reading a selection from Waiting for African Writers' Evening.

Kyomuhendo's first graphic novel, Sara and the Boy Soldier (2001), written for UNICEF-ESARO about child soldiers in Africa, received a middling review by GoodReads. Kyomuhendo has written a number of children's books and stories, but these have not been widely reviewed yet.

She is a contributor to the 2019 anthology New Daughters of Africa, edited by Margaret Busby, participating in a British Library event, alongside Anni Domingo, Ade Solanke and Zukiswa Wanner, to mark the 2020 publication of the paperback edition.

== Service with FEMRITE – Uganda Women Writers Association ==
As a founding member and the first Programmes Coordinator for FEMRITE from 1997 to 2007, Kyomuhendo has been cited by some younger FEMRITE members as being instrumental in their development and success. Ayeta Anne Wangusa, in an interview with Peter Nazareth of Iowa University, affectionately remembers Kyomuhendo as "a tough lady" who would not take no for an answer until she got Wangusa's first novel Memoirs of a Mother (1998) published. Mildred Barya, who joined FEMRITE in 1997 and later won the Ugandan National Book Trust Award in 2002 for her poetry collection Men Love Chocolates But They Don't Say (2002), has claimed: "from her (Kyomuhendo), I did not only acquire knowledge in publishing dynamics, but my writing improved, my poetry soared to the skies, I was set free, so I flew."

Kyomuhendo was joined by another and already established Ugandan author, Violet Barungi, who served as the FEMRITE editor from 1997 to 2007. During the Kyomuhendo/Barungi period of service from 1997 to 2007, FEMRITE members Doreen Baingana and Monica Arac de Nyeko would be nominated for the Caine Prize, with Monica Arac de Nyeko eventually winning the award in 2007. Additionally, other FEMRITE members during this time were shortlisted for or won various other prestigious literary awards.

Regarding FEMRITE in general during the period when Kyomuhendo was Programmes Coordinator, Monica Arac de Nyeko in her 2007 interview with the BBC declared: "FEMRITE has definitely had a positive impact on the Ugandan literary scene, particularly in forging a space for women’s voices to be heard. Perhaps as recently as the mid nineties there was a clear absence of women’s writing. FEMRITE came in, stormed the writing scene and is now a remarkable addition to our literary landscape."

Based upon both Kyomuhendo's FEMRITE service and published works as of 2009, the USA-based UTNE Reader nominated Kyomuhendo as one of "50 Visionaries Who Are Changing Your World", while describing FEMRITE as a "dynamic association for indigenous female writers."

== African Writers Trust ==
In 2009, Kyomuhendo founded African Writers Trust (AWT) in an effort to "coordinate and bring together African writers in the Diaspora and writers on the continent to promote sharing of skills and other resources, and to foster knowledge and learning between the two groups." Kyomuhendo has since served as the Director, joined by the following African writers as Advisory Board members: Zakes Mda, Susan Nalugwa Kiguli, Aminatta Forna, Mildred Barya, Helon Habila, and Ayeta Anne Wangusa. Although the Advisory Board includes members from various nations and regions in African, African Writers Trust as of 2011 is primarily operational in Uganda and headquartered in London.

The activities of African Writers Trust under Kyomuhendo have included writing workshops and conferences, with these receiving favourable attention from African journalists – albeit so far primarily from East African journalists.

== Tubaze African Books ==
In addition to her literary work, Kyomuhendo is the founder of TUBAZE African Books, a Ugandan-based literary platform that promotes African literature through book distribution, reading promotion, and literary engagement. The initiative focuses on making African-authored books more accessible, nurturing a reading culture, and supporting independent publishing across the continent. TUBAZE also operates a physical bookshop and organizes community-based literary activities such as book clubs, school outreach, and author events.

Kyomuhendo has also written The Essential Handbook For African Creative Writers, published by African Writers Press in 2013.

== Bibliography ==
=== Novels ===
- The First Daughter. Fountain Pub Ltd. 1996. ISBN 978-9970021192.
- Secrets No More. FEMRITE Publications Ltd. 1999. ISBN 978-9970901050.
- Sara and the Boy Soldier. Maskew Miller Longman, South Africa. 2001. ISBN 978-0636048157.
- Whispers from Vera. African Writers Trust. 2023.
- Waiting: A Novel of Uganda's Hidden War. New York: The Feminist Press. 2007. ISBN 978-1558615397.
- Promises. Catalyst Press. 2025. ISBN 978-1-960803-22-1.

=== Children's books ===
- Justus Saves His Uncle. Macmillan Publishers, UK. 2008. ISBN 978-0-230-53319-6.
- A Chance to Survive. Macmillan Publishers, UK. 2008. ISBN 978-0-230-53312-7.

== Non-fiction ==
- The Essential Handbook for African Creative Writers, African Writers Press, 2013, ISBN 9789970280025.

== See also ==
- African Writers Trust
- Femrite
