= Lillian Aujo =

Ugandan author

- Born: Lilian Akampurira Aujo; Uganda
- Education: University of East Anglia
- Occupation: writer
- Writing career
- Genres: Fiction, poetry
- Website: lillianakampuriraaujo.blogspot.com

Lillian Akampurira Aujo is a Ugandan author. In 2009, she was the winner of the Babishai Niwe (BN) Poetry Foundation's inaugural BN poetry prize. In 2015, she was longlisted for, and won the Inaugural Jalada Prize for Literature for her story "Where pumpkin leaves dwell".

== Education ==
She holds an MA in Creative Writing (Poetry) with distinction from the University of East Anglia, where she was a Global Voices Scholar.

== Writing ==
Aujo is a member of Femrite. Her works "The Eye of Poetry" and "Getting Nowhere" were published in Suubi, a publication of the African Writers Trust. She attended the Caine Prize workshop 2013, and her story "Red" was published in the anthology A Memory This Size and Other Stories: The Caine Prize for African Writing 2013. Her work has appeared in anthologies by Femrite, "Talking tales" and "Summoning the rains".

== Published works ==
=== Short stories ===
- "Red" in A Memory This Size and Other Stories: The Caine Prize for African Writing 2013. Jakana Media. 2013. ISBN 9781431408382.
- "My big toe", in Twongyeirwe, Hilda; Ellen Banda-Aaku, eds. (2012). Summoning the Rains. Femrite Publications. ISBN 9789970700257.
- "Where pumpkin leaves dwell"
- "Getting Somewhere" in The Suubi Collection (2013)

=== Poetry ===
- "Soft Tonight", in Beverley Nambozo Nsengiyunva, ed. (2014). A thousand voices rising: An anthology of contemporary African poetry. BN Poetry Foundation. ISBN 978-9970-9234-0-3.
- "Soft Tonight", in Violet Barungi, ed. (2009). Talking Tales. Femrite Publications. ISBN 9789970700219.
- "Born in these Times" in Bakwa, 2013
- "The eye of poetry" in The Suubi Collection (2013)
- "Fresh Coat of Paint" in the revelatormagazine
