= Recipe for Disaster =

Recipe(s) for Disaster may refer to:

- Recipe for Disaster (album), 2005 album by Brand New Sin
- Recipe for Disaster (book), 1994 novel by Lillian Tindyebwa
- Recipes for Disaster, 2004 book by CrimethInc.
- Recipe for Disaster (TV series), 2023 television series airing on The CW
- "Recipe for Disaster", an episode from season one of The Grim Adventures of Billy & Mandy
- "Recipe for Disaster", episode 17 from Season 1 of Masha and the Bear
- "Recipe for Disaster", a season 4 episode of The Loud House
