= Wangusa =

Wangusa is a surname. Notable people with the surname include:

- Ayeta Anne Wangusa (born 1971), Ugandan writer
- Timothy Wangusa (born 1942), Ugandan poet
