= NWFF =

NWFF can stand for:

- Ndiva Women's Film Festival, an African women's film festival
- New World First Ferry, a Hong Kong ferry service company
