= Gachagua =

Gachagua is a surname. Notable people with the surname include:

- Clifton Gachagua (born 1987), Kenyan poet and writer
- Nderitu Gachagua (1952–2017), Kenyan politician
- Rigathi Gachagua (born 1965), Kenyan politician
