= Hawa Jande Golakai =

Liberian writer and clinical scientist (born 1979)

- Born: June 1, 1979 (age 47); Frankfurt, Germany
- Education: University of Cape Town; Stellenbosch University
- Occupations: Writer and clinical scientist

Hawa Jande Golakai (born June 1, 1979) is a Liberian writer and clinical scientist. In 2014, she was chosen as one of 39 of Sub-Saharan Africa's most promising writers under the age of 40, showcased in the Africa39 project and included in the anthology Africa39: New Writing from Africa South of the Sahara (edited by Ellah Allfrey).

== Early life ==
Golakai was born in Frankfurt, Germany, and lived in Liberia during her childhood. She fled the country as a refugee during the First Liberian Civil War. After moving, she lived in Cape Town, South Africa, and pursued a medical career.

== Education ==
Golakai received a Bachelor of Science degree at the University of Cape Town in 2005, specializing in cell and molecular biology. She wrote her Master of Science dissertation at Stellenbosch University in 2008.

== Career ==
=== Immunology ===
Upon graduating from Stellenbosch University, Golakai began working at the university's Department of Biomedical Sciences. She works as a clinical immunologist and studies diseases, such as tuberculosis and HIV.

=== Writing ===
Golakai's debut novel The Lazarus Effect (Kwela Books) was shortlisted for the 2011 Sunday Times Fiction Prize and the University of Johannesburg Debut Prize, and was longlisted for the Wole Soyinka Prize for Literature in Africa. On the strength of the book, in 2012 Zukiswa Wanner in The Guardian rated Golakai as one of the "top five African writers". The Lazarus Effect was published in 2016 by Cassava Republic Press in the UK.

Golakai's second novel, The Score (Kwela Books) will be released in the UK in 2017. She won critical acclaim for her 2016 essay "Fugee", a personal account of the Ebola crisis in Liberia, commissioned for the anthology Safe House: Explorations in Creative Nonfiction, edited by Ellah Wakatama Allfrey, in partnership with Commonwealth Writers and published by Cassava Republic Press. Golokai is also a contributor to the 2019 anthology New Daughters of Africa, edited by Margaret Busby.

== Judging ==
Golakai was a mentor for the 2015 Writivism programme, a judge for the Etisalat Flash Fiction Prize 2015 and is a judge for the 2016 Short Story Day Africa prize.

== Honours ==
In April 2014, Golakai was named on the Hay Festival's Africa39 list of 39 of the most promising sub-Saharan African writers aged under 40 with potential and talent to define trends in African literature, and was included in the subsequent anthology edited by Ellah Allfrey, Africa39: New Writing from Africa South of the Sahara.

== Published works ==
- The Lazarus Effect (Kwela Books, South Africa, 2011; Cassava Republic Press, UK & Nigeria, 2016) ISBN 978-1-911115-08-3
- "Fugee" in Safe House: Explorations in Creative Nonfiction (Cassava Republic Press, 2016) ISBN 978-1-911115-16-8
- "Candy Girl" in Valentine's Day Anthology 2015 (Ankara Press, 2015)
- The Score (Kwela Books, South Africa, 2015)
