= Nana Ekua Brew-Hammond =

American poet

- Born: Plattsburgh, New York, United States
- Education: Mfantsiman Girls' Secondary School; Vassar College
- Occupation: Writer
- Writing career
- Genres: Fiction, poetry
- Website: www.nanabrewhammond.com

Nana Ekua Brew-Hammond (born October 5) is an American-Ghanaian writer of novels, short stories and a poet. She has written for AOL, Parenting Magazine, the Village Voice, Metro and Trace Magazine. Her short story "Bush Girl" was published in the May 2008 issues of African Writing and her poem "The Whinings of a Seven Sister Cum Laude Graduate Working Board as an Assistant" was published in 2006's Growing up Girl Anthology.

A graduate of Vassar College in the United States, Brew-Hammond attended secondary school in Ghana, and her 2010 young-adult book Powder Necklace is loosely based on that experience. In 2014, she was chosen as one of 39 of Sub-Saharan Africa's most promising writers under the age of 40, showcased in the Africa39 project and included in the anthology Africa39: New Writing from Africa South of the Sahara (edited by Ellah Wakatama Allfrey). She is also a contributor to the 2019 anthology New Daughters of Africa, edited by Margaret Busby.

== Personal life and education ==
She was born in the United States in Plattsburgh, New York, but her parents moved the family to Queens, where Brew-Hammond grew up before, at the age of 12, being sent back to Ghana, with her siblings, to attend secondary school by her parents. She went to one of the more prestigious girls secondary school in Ghana, Mfantsiman Girls' Secondary School in the Central Region. She is a cum laude graduate of Vassar College, Poughkeepsie, NY.

== Writing career ==
In 2010, Brew-Hammond's young adult novel Powder Necklace was published, a coming-of-age story that draws on some of her own experiences. She is also the author of Blue: A History of the Color As Deep As the Sea and as Wide as the Sky, a children's picture book, illustrated by Daniel Minter, that was published in 2022, as was Relations: An Anthology of African and Diaspora Voices, of which she was editor. Her debut novel for adults, entitled My Parents' Marriage, was published in 2024.

In 2014, Brew-Hammond was selected as one of the most promising African authors under 39 featured in the Hay Festival-Rainbow Book Club Project Africa39, in celebration of UNESCO's designation of Port Harcourt, Nigeria, as 2014 World Book Capital, and her story "Mama's Future" was included in the associated anthology edited by Ellah Wakatama Allfrey, Africa39: New Writing from Africa South of the Sahara (Bloomsbury). Brew-Hammond was shortlisted for the 2014 Miles Morland Writing Scholarship.

Also a style and culture writer, Brew-Hammond has been featured on MSNBC, NY1, SaharaTV, and ARISE TV, and has been published in Ebony Magazine, Ethiopian Airlines' Selamata Magazine, EBONY.com, The Village Voice, on NBC's thegrio.com, and MadameNoire.com, among other outlets". Her short story "After Edwin" is included in the 2019 anthology New Daughters of Africa, edited by Margaret Busby.

== Selected writings ==
=== Books ===
- Powder Necklace (YA novel), 2010
- Blue: A History of the Color As Deep As the Sea and as Wide as the Sky (for children; illustrated by Daniel Minter), 2022
- (As editor) Relations: An Anthology of African and Diaspora Voices, 2022
- My Parents' Marriage (novel), 2024

=== Shorter writings ===
- "Bush Girl"
- "The Whinings of a Seven Sister Cum Laude Graduate Working Bored as an Assistant"
- "The African Renaissance", Mosaic magazine, 18 May 2015
- "That Dudley in winter", Jaedyn Produces, 8 July 2024

== Interviews ==
- "Author Nana Ekua Brew-Hammond speaks to WomenWerk on advocacy, inspirations and keeping a day job"
- "An Interview with Nana Ekua Brew-Hammond, author of Powder Necklace"
- "Author Nana Ekua Brew-Hammond Discusses the Inspiration for Her Debut Novel, Powder Necklace". YouTube video.
- "Nana Ekua Brew-Hammond - Activism and Art: Personal Journeys in the Diaspora - Full Interview", AfricanFilmFest. YouTube, August 13, 2015.
- "Reading the Africa39 anthology: 'Mama's Future' by Nana Ekua Brew-Hammond", Africa39 Blog, 2015.
