= Angela Wamai =

Kenyan film editor

Angela Wanjiku Wamai
- Born: Nairobi
- Occupation: film director

Angela Wanjiku Wamai is a Kenyan film editor. Her first film, Shimoni, won awards including the Golden Film Award at the Luxor African film festival.

== Life ==
Wamai was born and raised in Nairobi. She studied Communications and Media at Kenya's Daystar University from 2002 to 2006. In 2010 she was in Cuba at the International School of Film and Television in Havana. She was there until 2013. She is an alumna of Talents Durban, a joint development program with the Berlin International Film Festival.

Wamai worked for a decade as an editor including New Moon directed by Philippa Ndisi-Herrmann and the documentary No Simple Way Home by Akuol de Mabior. Her first feature film, Shimoni premiered at the Toronto International Film Festival. It was selected for the 2023 edition of "They Are Cinema" organised by the Women for Africa Foundation .

=== Shimoni ===
Her first film had a male protagonist but it told the story of the women in his life. In 2024 it was the opening film at the Ndiva Women's Film Festival in Ghana.

=== Enkop ===
In 2025 her film Enkop (The Soil) was being shown at the film festival in Rotterdam. The film was described as led by women, neo-western and set in Kenya’s ranch land.

=== Films ===
- "I Had to Bury Dad" (2018, Writer / Editor / Co-producer),
- "No Simple Way Home" (2021, Editor), (2020),
- "Dad, Are You Ok?" (short film in 2020, Director),
- Shimoni (2022, Director).
- Enkop

== Awards ==
- Bronze Stallion at FESPACO for Shimoni
- Golden Film Award at the Luxor African Film Festival for Shimoni
