= Mary Watson (author) =

South African author (born 1975)

- Born: 31 May 1975 (age 51); Cape Town, South Africa
- Education: University of Cape Town

Mary Watson (born 31 May 1975) is a South African author. In 2006 she won the Caine Prize for African Writing and in 2014 was named on the Africa39 list of writers from sub-Saharan Africa aged under 40 with potential and talent to define trends in African literature.

== Biography ==
Born in Cape Town, Watson completed her master's degree in creative writing under André Brink at the University of Cape Town. After receiving a second master's degree at the University of Bristol in 2003, she returned to Cape Town where she completed her PhD. She worked as a lecturer in Film Studies at the University of Cape Town between 2004 and 2008.

Watson has lived in Galway, Ireland, since 2009.

== Career ==
Watson is the author of Moss, a collection of short stories published in 2004. In 2013, her novel The Cutting Room was published by Penguin South Africa. Her short stories have appeared in several anthologies.

In 2006, she won the Caine Prize for her short story "Jungfrau". She was a finalist in the Rolex Protege and Mentorship programme in 2012.

In April 2014, Watson was named in the Hay Festival's Africa39 project as one of 39 writers from sub-Saharan Africa aged under 40 with potential and talent to define trends in African literature.

== Works ==
- Moss, Kwela, Cape Town, 2004
- The Cutting Room, Penguin, Johannesburg, 2013
- The Wren Hunt, Bloomsbury, 2018
- The Wickerlight, Bloomsbury, 2019
- Blood to Poison, Bloomsbury, 2022
