= Sophie Alal =

Ugandan writer

- Born: Sophie Alal; Uganda
- Occupations: Lawyer, writer
- Writing career
- Genres: Fiction, poetry
- Website: deyuafrican.com

Sophie Alal is a Ugandan writer, lawyer, poet, journalist and cultural critic. She publishes at Deyu African, a cultural heritage initiative. She won the 2010 Beverley Nambozo Poetry Award with Making Modern Love. Her short stories have been published in the Kalahari Review, Lawino Magazine, AfricanColours and START journal. She has worked as a freelance correspondent for The EastAfrican, African Colours magazine and the Global Press Institute. She holds a law degree from Makerere University.

== Published works ==
=== Short stories ===
- "Here are the children" inJames Woodhouse, ed. (2017). Moonscapes: short stories and poetry. Africa Writers Trust. ISBN 978-9970-28-001-8.
- "Making Modern Love" inBeverley Nambozo Nsengiyunva, ed. (2014). A Thousand Voices Rising: An anthology of contemporary African poetry. BN Poetry Foundation. ISBN 978-9970-9234-0-3.
- "Partaking "
- "Debris"

=== Poetry ===
- "The rebel fell"
- "Making modern love"
