= Nyana Kakoma =

Ugandan writer, editor, blogger and publisher

- Born: Nyana Kakoma; Kampala, Uganda
- Other name: Hellen Nyana
- Education: Makerere University
- Occupations: Author, editor, blogger, publisher
- Website: somanystories.ug

Nyana Kakoma is a Ugandan writer, editor, blogger, and publisher from Kampala.

Career

She created the online platform Sooo Many Stories that promotes Ugandan literature. She formerly wrote under her maiden name Hellen Nyana. She is one of the facilitators of Writivism in Kampala 2015.

She took part in "Bremen & Kampala – Spaces of Transcultural Writing", a collaboration between writers from Uganda and Bremen. She is a member of Femrite. In February 2015, she was awarded an editorial fellowship at Modjaji Books by the African Writers Trust and Commonwealth Writers. A number of her articles have appeared in newspapers. She attended the Caine Prize workshop 2013, and her story "Chief Mourner" was published in the Caine Prize anthology A Memory This Size and Other Stories: The Caine Prize for African Writing 2013.

== Early life and education ==
Nyana attended Gayaza High School for secondary education. She graduated from Makerere University with a Bachelor of Arts degree, majoring in Literature and Communication Skills.

== Published works ==
=== Short stories ===
- "Chief Mourner" in A Memory This Size and Other Stories: The Caine Prize for African Writing 2013. Jakana media. 2013. ISBN 9781431408382.
- "Just because you didn't win"
- "Fringes" in Storymoja blog, 2014
- "Waiting" in The Suubi Collection (2013)
