= Babishai Niwe Poetry Foundation =

Babishai Niwe (BN) Poetry Foundation
- Awarded for: Poetry award for African poets
- Location: Uganda
- Country: Uganda
- Presented by: Beverley Nambozo
- First award: 2008
- Website: www.bnpoetryaward.co.ug

Babishai Niwe (BN) Poetry Foundation, formerly "The Beverley Nambozo Poetry Award", is a poetry foundation that coordinates annual poetry competitions for African poets. It was started by Beverley Nambozo in 2008 as a prize for Ugandan women. But in 2014, it opened its doors to men and the entire Africa continent. The first Beverley Nambozo Poetry Award was held in 2009.

== Entry and prize ==
The BN poetry award begun in 2009, as a prize for short, unpublished poems in English by Ugandan women. Entries must be written on an annual theme. There was no theme in 2009. The theme for 2010 was "money and culture". The one for 2011 was "hope". In 2012 the theme was "music". The theme for 2013 was "Innovation". The cash prizes for the top three poems were $250, $150, and $100. The prizes and the prize money have since increased, with the winner in 2014 receiving $1000. The winning poems from 2009 to 2013 were published in an anthology, A Thousand Voices Rising: An anthology of contemporary African poetry.

== Award winners ==
- Orimoloye Moyosore and Sanya Noel Lima, (joint winners, 2016)
- Adeeko Ibukun, 2015
- Tom Jalio, 2014
- Rashida Namulondo, 2013
- Susan Piwang, 2012
- Sanyu Kisaka, 2011
- Sophie Alal Brenda, 2010
- Lillian Aujo, 2009

== Publications ==
- Beverley Nambozo Nsengiyunva, ed. (2014). A Thousand Voices Rising: An anthology of contemporary African poetry. BN Poetry Foundation. ISBN 978-9970-9234-0-3.
