= Jackee Budesta Batanda =

Ugandan writer

- Born: Jackee Budesta Batanda; Uganda
- Education: Makerere University; University of the Witwatersrand
- Occupations: Journalist, writer and entrepreneur
- Website: jackeebatanda.com

Jackee Budesta Batanda is a Ugandan journalist, writer and entrepreneur. She is a senior managing partner with Success Spark Brand Limited, a communications and educational company, and a co-founder of Mastermind Africa Group Limited, a business-networking group. In 2006, Batanda worked as a peace writer at the Joan B. Kroc Institute for Peace and Justice at the University of San Diego. She was later awarded a research fellowship at the highly competitive Justice in Africa fellowship Programme with the Institute for Justice and Reconciliation in Cape Town, South Africa, in 2008. In 2010, Batanda was International Writer-in-Residence at the Housing Authors and Literature Denmark, where she commenced work on her novel, A Lesson in Forgetting. In 2012, she was also featured in The Times alongside 19 young women shaping the future of Africa. That same year she was also a finalist in the 2012 Trust Women journalism Awards. She has been writer-in-residence at Lancaster University in the UK. She was selected by the International Women's Media Foundation as the 2011–12 Elizabeth Neuffer Fellow. During the fellowship, she studied at the Massachusetts Institute of Technology's Center for International Studies and other Boston-area universities, and worked at The New York Times and The Boston Globe.

She is a recipient of the 2010 Uganda Young Achievers Awards in the Corporate and Professionals category and a Justice in Africa program fellowship. She has worked as a freelance journalist with the Global Press Institute, an online newswire, and was previously a senior Communications Officer with the Refugee Law Project of the Faculty of Law at Makerere University, Kampala, Uganda. She is one of the 39 African writers announced as part of the Africa39 project unveiled by Rainbow, Hay Festival and Bloomsbury Publishing at the London Book Fair in April 2014. It is a list of 39 of Sub-Saharan Africa's most promising writers under the age of 40.

== Early life and education ==
Batanda is a Samia from the eastern part of Uganda. She studied at Mary Hill High School in Mbarara, Bweranyangi Girls' Secondary School in Bushenyi and St. Paul's College in Mbale. She holds a master's degree in forced migration studies from the University of the Witwatersrand in South Africa and an undergraduate degree in communications from Makerere University in Uganda.

== Writing ==
Batanda has been writing professionally for over ten years both as a freelance journalist for national papers–The Sunday Vision and Sunday Monitor–and as a writer of fiction. Among her numerous awards for fiction writing is winning the Commonwealth Short Story Competition, 2003, and being shortlisted for the Macmillan Writers Prize for Africa, 2003. Her work has been performed on the BBC World Service, BBC 3 and other radio stations around the Commonwealth. Batanda has written numerous short stories that have been published in various anthologies, including the titles "The Thing That Ate Your Brain", "Holding onto the Memories" and "Dora's Turn", among others. She has written for Transitions on the Foreign Policy magazine website, the New York Times, Boston Globe, Latitude News, the Global Post, The Star, the Mail&Guardian, the Sunday Vision and Sunday Monitor.

Batanda is a member of the Uganda Women Writers Association FEMRITE, and she has been Writer-in-Residence at Lancaster University, where she worked on The Big Picture, a collaborative book with three writers from the north west. She has been fellow on the British Council's Crossing Borders programme.

She was regional winner of the 2003 Commonwealth Short Story Competition and has been highly commended for the Caine Prize for African Writing and shortlisted for the Macmillan Writer's Prize for Africa. She has published a children's book, The Blue Marble, in conjunction with UNESCO-Paris and Sub-Saharan Publishers (Ghana). Her stories have been published in various journals and short story anthologies, including Farafina, Edinburgh Review, Moving Worlds, Gifts of Harvest, The Spirit of the Commonwealth, Wasafiri, Jazz, Miracles and Dreams, among places, and she is a contributor to Margaret Busby's 2019 anthology New Daughters of Africa. She has completed two projects, Everyday People, a collection of short stories, and Our Time of Sorrow, a novel.

== Published works ==
=== Non fiction ===
- "Seeking Freedom Among the Ruins: A Narrative of the Life and Work of Shukrije Gashi", Joan B. Kroc Institute for Peace and Justice, March 2007.
- "For Our Children", in Violet Barungi and Ayeta Anne Wangusa, ed. (2003). Tears of Hope, a Collection of Short Stories by Ugandan Rural Women. Femrite Publications. ISBN 978-9970700028.

=== Short stories ===
- "The Thing That Ate Your breakfast", in Rohin Chowdhury and Zukiswa Wanner, ed. (2012). Behind The Shadows. Contemporary Stories from Africa and Asia.
- "My Mother Dances in the Dark", in Dike Okoro, ed. (2010). Speaking for the Generations: An Anthology of Contemporary African Short Stories. Africa World Press. ISBN 978-1592217199.
- "1 4 the Road…till 4am", in Emma Dawson, ed. (2010). Butterfly Dreams and Other Stories from Uganda. Typhon media. ISBN 9789881516589.
- "Remember Atita", in Jennifer Bassett, ed. (2008). Dancing with Strangers: Stories from Africa. Oxford University Press. ISBN 9780194791977.
- "A Pocket Full of Dreams", in Helon Habila, Kadija George, ed. (2008). Dreams, Miracles and Jazz. Picador Africa. ISBN 9781770100251.
- "Dora's Turn", in Jennifer Bassett, ed. (2008). Cries from the Heart: Stories from Around the World. Oxford University Press. ISBN 978-0194790840.
- "Dance with Me", in Violet Barungi, ed. (2006). Gifts of Harvest. Femrite Publications. ISBN 978-9970700042.
- "Stella", in Annie Clarkson and Chris Fittock, ed. (2005). The Big Picture. Lancaster Litfest Publications. ISBN 978-0954088095.
- "Life Sucks…Sometimes", in Seventh Street Alchemy. Jacana Media (Pty) Ltd. 2005. ISBN 978-1770091450.
- "Dance with me", in Raoul J. Granqvist, ed. (2005). Michael's Eyes: The War Against the Ugandan Child. Umea, Sweden: Institutionen for moderna sprak Umea universitet. ISBN 9173059897.
- "A Job for Mundu", in Violet Barungi, ed. (2001). Words from a Granary. Femrite Publications. ISBN 9789970700011.
- "Waiting on the frangipani tree", in Per Contra, 2012
- "Doing nothing"
- "Remember Atita "
- "The Rule of the Game", in Forma Fluens, October 2010
- "Holding on to the Memories", in Feminist and Online Scholar Journal, 2009
- "Aciro's Song", in Wasafiri, June 2007, and Edinburgh Review, August 2006
- "The Rule of the Game" in Crossing Borders Magazine, October 2006
- "I Took her a Hibiscus", in The Sunday Monitor, December 2005
- "City Link", in Moving Worlds journal, December 2005
- "Dora's Turn", Commonwealth Broadcasting Association (CBA) CD, October 2004
- "Bahati from Bunia", in World View, June–August, 2004
- "It was Eden", in Masscom Online, 2002
- "Four Sweets Please", in Dhana, March 2002
- "Tears of Sky", in New Era Magazine, 2002
- "Radio Africa", in Win Magazine, September 2001

== Awards and recognition ==
- Listed among 39 top writers from Africa – Africa39, April 2014
- April winner of the Real Wealth & Success for Real People Scholarship, Loral Langemeier Millionaire Maker, April 2014
- 2012 finalist, Trust Women Journalist Award, October 2012, Thomson Reuters Foundation and International Herald Tribune
- London Times "20 women shaping the future of Africa", 19 March 2012
- 2011–2012 Elizabeth Neuffer Fellow, September 2011 – March 2012, Boston and New York City
- Young Achievers Award 2010 – Corporate and Professionals, 3 December 2010
- Global Press Institute Online Photo Essay Training Award, October 2010 – March 2011
- International Writer-in-Residence, Housing Authors and Literature Denmark (H.A.L.D), Viborg, Denmark, July–August 2010
- Fellow in Transitional Justice in Africa Programme, Institute for Justice and Reconciliation, Cape Town, South Africa, October–November 2008
- Scholarship to attend "Crafting Human Security in an Insecure World Conference", Joan B. Kroc Institute for Peace and Justice, University of San Diego, USA, September 2008
- Post-graduate Merit Award, University of the Witwatersrand, Johannesburg, South Africa, 2006.
- Forced Migration Studies Departmental Grant, University of Witwatersrand, Johannesburg, South Africa, 2006
- Appointed writer-in-residence, Lancaster University and Litfest, Lancaster, UK, January–March 2005
- Highly commended for the Commonwealth Short Story Competition, 2004
- Highly commended for the Caine Prize for African Writing, 2004
- Shortlisted for Macmillan Writer's Prize for Africa, 2004
- Africa Regional Winner of the Commonwealth Short Story Competition, 2003
- Thrice selected as fellow on the Crossing Borders an African Writers' Mentoring Scheme run by British Council 2002/2003, 2003/2004, 2004
