= Africa39 =

Collaborative literature project by the Hay Festival and Rainbow Book Club

Africa39 was a collaborative project initiated by the Hay Festival in partnership with Rainbow Book Club, celebrating Port Harcourt: UNESCO World Book Capital 2014 by identifying 39 of the most promising writers under the age of 40 with the potential and talent to define trends in the development of literature from Africa and the African diaspora. Launched in 2014, Africa39 followed the success of two previous Hay Festival initiatives linked to World Book Capital cities, Bogotá39 (2007) and Beirut39 (2009).

The judges for Africa39 were Margaret Busby, Osonye Tess Onwueme and Elechi Amadi, selecting from submissions researched by Binyavanga Wainaina. The writers' names were announced at the London Book Fair on 8 April 2014.

An anthology entitled Africa39: New Writing from Africa South of the Sahara, featuring work by the 39 selected writers, was published by Bloomsbury in October 2014, edited by Ellah Wakatama Allfrey and with a preface by Nobel Laureate Wole Soyinka. Containing excerpts from published novels and works-in-progress as well as complete short stories, according to Stephanie Santana's review: "It is an anthology that refuses to be a thematic container for, or a survey of, new African writing. Instead, it is a truly 'plural text' with many entrances, exits, and detours."

== The list ==
- Chimamanda Ngozi Adichie (Nigeria)
- Richard Ali A Mutu (Democratic Republic of Congo)
- Monica Arac de Nyeko (Uganda)
- Rotimi Babatunde (Nigeria)
- Eileen Barbosa (Cape Verde)
- A. Igoni Barrett (Nigeria)
- Jackee Budesta Batanda (Uganda)
- Recaredo Silevo Boturu (Equatorial Guinea)
- Nana Brew-Hammond (Ghana/US)
- Shadreck Chikoti (Malawi)
- Edwige-Renée Dro (Ivory Coast)
- Tope Folarin (Nigeria/US)
- Clifton Gachagua (Kenya)
- Stanley Gazemba (Kenya)
- Mehul Gohil (Kenya)
- Hawa Jande Golakai (Liberia)
- Shafinaaz Hassim (South Africa)
- Abubakar Adam Ibrahim (Nigeria)
- Stanley Onjezani Kenani (Malawi/Switzerland)
- Dinaw Mengestu (Ethiopia/US)
- Nadifa Mohamed (Somalia/UK)
- Nthikeng Mohlele (South Africa)
- Linda Musita (Kenya)
- Sifiso Mzobe (South Africa)
- Glaydah Namukasa (Uganda)
- Kioko Ndinda (Kenya)
- Okwiri Oduor (Kenya)
- Ukamaka Olisakwe (Nigeria)
- Ondjaki (Luanda, Angola/Rio de Janeiro, Brazil)
- Chibundu Onuzo (Nigeria)
- Nii Ayikwei Parkes (Ghana/UK)
- Taiye Selasi (Ghana/Nigeria/UK/Italy)
- Namwali Serpell (Zambia/US)
- Lola Shoneyin (Nigeria)
- Novuyo Rosa Tshuma (Zimbabwe/South Africa)
- Chika Unigwe (Nigeria/Belgium/US)
- Zukiswa Wanner (Zambia/South Africa/Zimbabwe/Kenya)
- Mary Watson (South Africa/Ireland)
- Mohamed Yunus Rafiq (Tanzania)
