= Lillian Tindyebwa =

Ugandan writer living in Kampala

- Born: Lillian Tindyebwa; Uganda
- Education: Makerere University
- Occupation: Writer
- Writing career
- Genre: Fiction
- Notable work: Recipe for Disaster (1994)

Lillian Tindyebwa is a Ugandan writer living in Kampala. She is the author of numerous books, notably the novel Recipe for Disaster, published in 1994 as part of the Fountain youth series. She is a founding member of FEMRITE, and the founder of Uganda Faith Writers Association.

== Early life and education ==
Lillian Tindyebwa has said: "I was influenced through reading, and I grew up reading many books at home. My late father was a teacher of English and, although he never wrote, he read a lot. When I was in primary school, I particularly remember coming across an old copy of Bunyan's Pilgrims Progress among his things and reading it. I had often thought that I could be a writer, especially during my secondary school. For some unknown reason, possibly due to lack of role models, I did not get around to putting pen on paper until much later in my life."

She holds an MA in literature from Makerere University, Kampala, Uganda.

== Writing career ==
Tindyebwa's novel Recipe for Disaster (1994), published by Fountain Publishers, is used as a reader in secondary schools in Uganda. It is part of the Fountain youth series. She has written three children stories: A Day to Remember (2008), A Will to Win (2008) and Maggie’s Friends (2008). They are all published by Macmillan Publishers. Her short story "Looking for my Mother" is published in a FEMRITE anthology, A Woman’s Voice. Other short stories in FEMRITE anthologies are: "Hard Truth" in Words from a Granary, "Endless Distance" in World of their Own, "Just a Note" and "Gift of a Letter", included in Talking Tales. True life stories of women, also published in FEMRITE anthologies are "Betrayed by Fate", "Beyond the Dance and the Music", which are about FGM in Kapchorwa, Eastern Uganda, and "Dance with a Wolf" in I Dare to Say. She facilitated a writing workshop at Littworld 2012, in Nairobi.

== Other activities ==
From 2009 she was a member of the jury committee of the Burt Award for African Literature for Children's Book Project for Tanzania, sponsored by CODE Canada. She also assisted in training the participating writers in creative writing skills. She is the Director of Uganda Faith Writers Association, an organisation that trains and develops Christian writing and publishing.

She works as a lecturer in Literature and Linguistics at Kabale University in South-Western Uganda.

She is married to Stephen and they have five children. She lives in Kampala, Uganda.

== Published works ==
=== Novels ===
- Recipe for Disaster. Fountain Publishers. June 1994. ISBN 978-9970020331.

=== Children's books ===
- A Time to Remember, Macmillan Publishers, 2008.
- Maggie's Friends, Macmillan Publishers, 2008.
- A Will to Win, Macmillan Publishers, 2008.

=== Short stories ===
- "Endless Distance", in Hilda Twongyeirwe, ed. (2012). Word of Our Own and other stories. Femrite Publications. ISBN 9789970700257.
- "Beyond the Music and the Dance", in Hilda Twongyeirwe, ed. (2012). I Dare Say: African Women Share Their Stories of Hope and Survival. Chicago: Lawrence Hill Books. ISBN 978-1-56976-842-6.
- "Life Goes On", and "The Second family", in Hilda Twongyeirwe and Aaron Mushengyezi, ed. (2011). Never Too Late. Femrite Publications. ISBN 9789970700233.
- "The Hard Truth", in Peter Wasamba, Harriet Mugambi and Jane Bwoya, ed. (2010). Tales from my Motherland. The Jomo Kenyatta Foundation, Nairobi, Kenya. ISBN 9789966228451.
- "One Day in the Classroom", in Okaka Dokatum and Rose Rwakasisi, ed. (2009). The Butterfly Dance: words and sounds of colour. Femrite Publications. ISBN 978-9970-700-18-9.
- "Mocked by Fate", in Violet Barungi and Hilda Twongyeirwe, ed. (2009). Beyond the Dance: Voices of women on female genital mutilation. Femrite Publications. ISBN 9789970700196.
- "Just a Note", in Violet Barungi, ed. (2009). Talking Tales. Femrite Publications. ISBN 9789970700219.
- "Hard Truth", in Violet Barungi, ed. (2001). Words from a Granary. Femrite Publications. ISBN 9789970700011.
- "Looking for My Mother", in Mary Karooro Okurut, ed. (1998). A Woman's Voice. Femrite Publications. ISBN 9789970901036.
- "Wind under my sails"

=== Poems ===
- Peace, in Painted Voices: A collage of art and Poetry Volume II. Femrite Publications. 2009. ISBN 9789970700189.
- "God is here"
