= The African Saga =

1998 book by Susan Nalugwa Kiguli

- The African Saga by Susan Kiguli
- Author: Susan Nalugwa Kiguli
- Language: English
- Publisher: Femrite Publications
- Publication date: 1998
- Publication place: Uganda
- Pages: 61
- ISBN: 9789970901005

The African Saga is a collection of poems by Ugandan poet Susan Nalugwa Kiguli. Published in 1998, it won the National Book Trust of Uganda Poetry Award (1999), It is a collection of 95 poems in four sections: “Poems of Protest”, “Relational Poems”, “Poems of Nature” and “Existential Poems”.

== Awards and recognition ==
- Won the National Book Trust of Uganda Poetry Award, 1999.
