= Glaydah Namukasa =

Ugandan writer and midwife

- Born: Glaydah Namukasa; Entebbe, Uganda
- Occupations: Midwife, writer
- Writing career
- Genre: Fiction
- Notable works: Deadly Ambition; Voice of a Dream

Glaydah Namukasa is a Ugandan writer and midwife. She is the author of two novels, Voice of a Dream and Deadly Ambition. She is a member of FEMRITE, the Ugandan Women Writer's Association, and was the Chairperson in 2014 for 2 terms. She is one of the 39 African writers announced as part of the Africa39 project unveiled by Rainbow, Hay Festival and Bloomsbury Publishing at the London Book Fair 2014. It is a list of 39 of Sub-Saharan Africa's most promising writers under the age of 40.

== Early life and education ==
Glaydah was born in Entebbe, Uganda. Bereaved of her father as a child, she grew up in Entebbe with her mother, three sisters and two brothers. She studied in Nkumba Primary School, then Entebbe Secondary School. She graduated as a midwife in June 2000 at Kabale Nursing School. Currently, she is working with Wakiso District. She joined the Uganda Women Writers Association, FEMRITE in 2002. Later she joined the British Council Crossing Borders creative writing scheme.

She started her writing career by telling stories to fellow students at Nkumba Primary and Entebbe Secondary School. She used to ask herself why she could not write the stories instead. She would use exercise books to record her stories and later request friends to read through the work. One of her enthusiastic friends, Andrew Byogi, who read them over and over again, recommended her to FEMRITE, where she became an activist and active writer.

== Writing ==
Namukasa’s young adult novel, Voice of a Dream, won the 2005–2006 Macmillan Writers’ Prize for Africa (Senior Prize). In 2006, she was awarded the Michael and Marylee Fairbanks International Fellowship, which enabled her to attend the Bread Loaf Writers’ Conference in Ripton, Vermont, United States.

Her second novel, The Deadly Ambition, was published in 2006 as part of the Crossing Borders creative writing project. In the fall of 2008, Namukasa was awarded the title of Honorary Fellow by the International Writing Program (IWP) at the University of Iowa.

She has also been a visiting writer in residence at City of Asylum Pittsburgh and at Ledig House International Writers’ Residency in Hudson, New York, where she began drafting her second novel. As a participant in the Friends of Writing project, she worked on her novel Crossing the Bramble Field with mentor Angela Barry.

In 2012, her short story “My New Home” was part of a project highlighting African women writing in indigenous languages.

Namukasa’s short fiction has appeared in anthologies published in Uganda, South Africa, Sweden, and the United Kingdom, including in New Daughters of Africa (2019), edited by Margaret Busby. In addition to fiction for adult audiences, she has written three books for children, all published under the Pan African imprint of Macmillan.

== Published works ==
=== Novels ===
- Voice of a Dream. Macmillan Education. 2006. ISBN 978-1-4050-9592-1.
- The Deadly Ambition. Mallory International Limited (Verlag). 2006. ISBN 978-1-85657-103-6.

=== Short stories ===
- "And Still Hope Survives", in Helon Habila, Kadija George, ed. (2008). Dreams, Miracles and Jazz. Picador Africa. ISBN 9781770100251.
- "Then Now and Tomorrow", in Jungfrau and other short stories: The Caine Prize for African Writing, 7th Annual Collection. New Internationalist Publications Ltd. 2007. ISBN 978-1-904456-62-9.
- "The Naked Bones", in Violet Barungi, ed. (2006). Gifts of Harvest. FEMRITE publications. ISBN 9789970700042.
- "Ojera's Final Hope", in Raoul J. Granqvist, ed. (2005). Michael's Eyes: The War against the Ugandan Child. Umea, Sweden : Institutionen for moderna sprak Umea universitet. ISBN 9173059897.
- "The Second Twin", in Hilda Twongyeirwe, ed. (2004). I Dare to Say. FEMRITE publications. ISBN 978-1-56976-842-6.
- "My New Home", Words Without Borders, 2013
- "Dreams dreams and dreams!", authorme.com

=== Poems ===
- "Yet Hope Survives", Sable Magazine, UK (shortlisted for the Ken Sarowiwa Legacy) 2004
- "That Place", FEMRITE Word Write Journal, 2004, republished in Poetry Poster Project, 2008
