= Monica Arac de Nyeko =

Ugandan writer (born 1979)

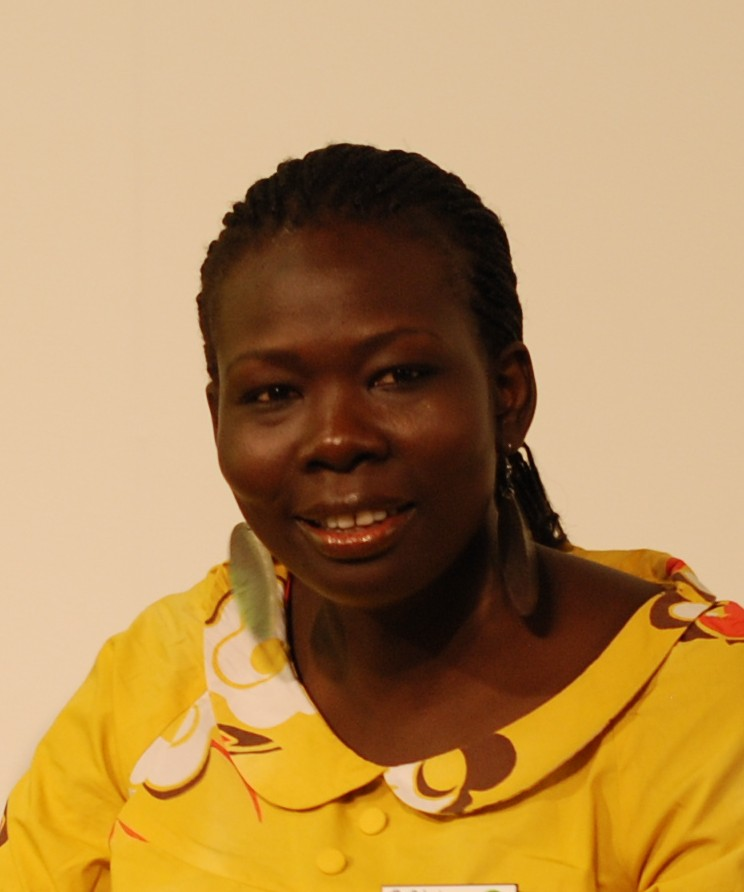
- Born: Monica Arac de Nyeko; 1979 (age 46–47); Kitgum, Uganda
- Education: Makerere University
- Occupation: Writer
- Writing career
- Genre: Fiction
- Notable work: "Jambula Tree"
- Notable awards: Caine Prize

Monica Arac de Nyeko (born 1979) is a Ugandan writer of short fiction, poetry, and essays, living in Nairobi, Kenya. In 2007, she became the first Ugandan to win the Caine Prize for African Writing, with her story "Jambula Tree". She had previously been shortlisted for the prize in 2004 for "Strange Fruit", a story about child soldiers in Gulu, Northern Uganda. She is a member of FEMRITE – Uganda Women Writers Association and the chief editor of T:AP Voices. She taught literature and English at St. Mary's College Kisubi, before proceeding to pursue a master's degree in Humanitarian Assistance at the University of Groningen. Her personal essay "In the Stars" won first prize in the Women's World, Women in War Zones essay writing competition. She has been published in Memories of Sun, The Nation, IS magazine, Poetry International and several other publications. She was one of the writers chosen as part of the Africa39 project unveiled by Rainbow, Hay Festival and Bloomsbury Publishing at the London Book Fair 2014, featuring a list of 39 of Sub-Saharan Africa's most promising writers under the age of 40.

== Early life and education ==
Arac de Nyeko comes from Kitgum district in northern Uganda. She grew up mostly in Kampala, but attended high school in Gulu, northern Uganda, for some years. She has a degree in education from Makerere University, and a master's degree in Humanitarian Assistance from the University of Groningen in The Netherlands. While at Makerere she was an active member of FEMRITE – Uganda Women Writers Association, which she has credited for giving her "a place and space to write with a network of support and mentorship—handy when you are starting out." She is a contributor to the 2019 anthology New Daughters of Africa, edited by Margaret Busby.

== Writing ==
In 2007, Arac de Nyeko won the Caine Prize for her short story "Jambula Tree", which is about two teenage girls falling in love and facing an unforgiving community as a result. One of Arac de Nyeko's other notable stories is "Strange Fruit", which contains an allusion to the song of the same name, and was shortlisted for the Caine Prize in 2004.

== Published works ==
=== Essays ===
- "Pastor Love", in Helon Habila, Kadija George, ed. (2012). Space: Currencies in Contemporary African Art. Unisa Press. ISBN 978-1868886807.

=== Short stories ===
- "Jambula Tree", in Karen Martin and Makhosazana Xaba, ed. (2013). Queer Africa: New and Collected Fiction. MaThhoko's books. ISBN 9781920590338.
- "Back Home", in Helon Habila, Kadija George, ed. (2008). Dreams, Miracles and Jazz. Picador Africa. ISBN 9781770100251.
- "Jambula Tree", in Jambula Tree and other stories: The Caine Prize for African Writing 8th Annual Collection. New Internationalist. 2008. ISBN 978-1904456735.
- "Jambula Tree", in Ama Ata Aidoo, ed. (2007). African Love Stories: An Anthology. Lynne Rienner Publishers. ISBN 978-0954702366.
- "Strange Fruit", in Seventh Street Alchemy. Jacana Media (Pty) Ltd. 2005. ISBN 978-1770091450.
- "Grasshopper Redness", in Seventh Street Alchemy. Jacana Media (Pty) Ltd. 2005. ISBN 978-1770091450.
- "October Sunrise", in Jane Kurtz, ed. (2003). Memories of Sun: Stories of Africa and America. Amistad. ISBN 978-0060510503.
- "Bride Price for my Daughter", in Violet Barungi and Ayeta Anne Wangusa, ed. (2003). Tears of Hope. a Collection of Short Stories by Ugandan Rural Women. Femrite Publications. ISBN 978-9970700028.
- "Chained", in Violet Barungi, ed. (2001). Words from a Granary. Femrite Publications. ISBN 9789970700011.
- "Jambula tree"
- "The Banana Eater" in AGNI online, 2008
- "Strange Fruit" in author-me, 2004
