= Victoria Nalongo Namusisi =

Ugandan journalist, political administrator and philanthropist

- Born: 1956 (age 69–70)
- Citizenship: Uganda
- Education: Kisubi Girls School
- Occupation: Political Journalist

Victoria Nalongo Namusisi (sometimes styled as Victoria Okoth Nalongo Namusisi) (born 19 January 1956) is a Ugandan Sports and Political journalist, political administrator and philanthropist. Namusisi is considered the first Ugandan female sports journalist, and she served as a Resident District Commissioner for Mpigi District between 1991 and 1997. In 2010, she was a recipient of the Nalubaale Medal.

== Background and education ==
Namusisi was born to the late Paul Mukasa, a farmer and fisherman and Miriam Nalunga on 19 January 1956. For her formative years, Namusisi studied at Kisubi Girls School in Entebbe and Old Kampala Senior Secondary School. She later joined the Institute of Public Administration (IPA) for journalism in 1975 and completed the course in 1977.

== Career ==
=== Sports journalism ===
In 1976, Namusisi was the only female sports journalist at the Uganda Times. She also worked at the Voice of Uganda in 1984 after returning from exile in Kenya. In 1988, while working at Ngabo newspaper, Namusisi then covered the 1988 Olympics in Seoul as a sports journalist in addition to being the team's female chaperone

=== Political reporting ===
In 1986, Namusisi made a switch to political reporting and was assigned to the Parliament and State House. It is from this position that she was then appointed Resident District Commissioner (RDC) for Mpigi District.

=== Political administration ===
Between 1991 and 1998, Namusisi was appointed and served as Resident District Commissioner (RDC) for the then Mpigi District. She was also a member of the National Steering Committee in 1998 by virtue of her position in local government.

== Philanthropy ==
After resigning as a Presidential Advisor in 2003, Namusisi co-founded an orphanage with Manuel Pinto, Bright Kids Uganda

== Awards ==
On 1 April 2023, Nalongo Victoria Namusisi received the African Humanitarian Award at the African Heritage Concert and Awards in Kigali Rwanda. In 2010, Namusisi was a recipient of the Nalubaale Medal – a medal "awarded to all civilian activists who have contributed towards the political development of Uganda either through armed struggle or civil disobedience and otherwise right from colonial times to date". Later on in May 2019, she received an Honorary Degree of Doctor of Humane Letters at Carlow University, Pittsburgh, Pennsylvania, which according to her organization's website was in "recognition of her humanitarian work with the vulnerable people in Uganda".

== Personal life ==
Namusisi was married to the former General Secretary of the National Council of Sports, Martin Okoth, until 1984 when they separated. Together they had three biological children.
