= Recipe for Disaster (book) =

1994 novel by Lillian Tindyebwa

- Author: Lillian Tindyebwa
- Language: English
- Publisher: Fountain Publishers
- Publication date: 1994
- Publication place: Uganda
- Media type: Print (hardback & paperback)
- Pages: 148
- ISBN: 978-9970020331

Recipe for Disaster is a 1994 novel by Ugandan author Lillian Tindyebwa. The novel is used as a supplementary reader in secondary schools in Uganda.

== Plot ==
Recipe for Disaster is a story about Hellen Ntale that follows the life choices she makes, how she gets expelled from St. Joseph's Girls School, and how she leaves school three months before her high school final exams.

She has a relationship with Kevin, a 42-year-old man, against her parents' approval. Hellen goes on to form other relationships with men outside her marriage. One of these is with Kevin's partner's son, Trevor Kendall, a twenty-five-year-old man nearly her age.

After a fight on Christmas Eve with Kevin over his soon-to-be fourth wife Cindy, a student at the university, Kevin beats her up and Hellen runs to London. There, she intends to give Trevor a child in order to make Kevin jealous. However, once she has conceived, Trevor announces that he is engaged, much to Hellen's surprise. She attempts to kill Trevor's fiancée, Diane.

Hellen ends up in the hospital. When she is released, Trevor and Diane are already married and long gone. Hellen return home to Uganda, where Kevin welcomes her, tells her about the death of his first wife, and asks if they should be tested for AIDS. It is discovered that Hellen has it, and so does her child.

Hellen gives birth. Kevin is distressed to see the baby is blond, and demands to know who is the father. Discovering it is Trevor, he decides to kill Hellen. With the help of a nurse and bodyguard, Hellen escapes and finds herself in a slum. Kevin is admitted into a hospital for the mentally ill.

Hellen is discovered by her parents, whom she is ashamed and happy to see. She narrates her story to them before dying, leaving her child to cry.
