= Beatrice Lamwaka =

Ugandan writer

- Born: Beatrice Lamwaka; Alokolum, Gulu, Uganda
- Education: Uganda Martyrs Secondary School, Namugongo<Makerere University (Bachelor of Arts with Education) (Master's degree in human rights)
- Occupations: Writer, writing teacher
- Writing career
- Genre: Short stories
- Notable work: "Butterfly Dreams"
- Notable awards: Nominee for 2011 Caine Prize for story "Butterfly Dreams": Janzi Awards 2021 ("Butterfly Dreams"); Young Achievers Award 2011; Laureate for Council for the Development of Social Science Democratic Governance Institute 2012; Harry Frank Guggenheim Foundation Fellow, 2009

Beatrice Lamwaka (born and raised in Alokolum, Gulu) is a Ugandan writer. She was shortlisted for the 2011 Caine Prize for her story "Butterfly Dreams".

== Other works ==
She is the founder and director of the Arts Therapy Foundation, a non-profit organisation that provides psychological and emotional support through creative arts therapies. She is the general secretary of PEN Uganda Chapter and an executive member of the Uganda Reproduction Rights Organisation (URRO). She has served on the executive board of the Uganda Women Writers Association (FEMRITE), where she has been a member since 1998. She formerly wrote articles for the Global Press Institute about issues affecting women, including HIV/AIDS, the impact of war on women, and social justice. Her short stories and novel also focus on these issues.

In 2009, she was a writer in residence at Château de Lavingny, Switzerland. In November 2013, she was a resident working on her novel, Sunflowers, at the Rockefeller Foundation's Bellagio Center. She was a recipient of 2011 Young Achievers Award in the category of Art, Culture and Fashion. She received a grant from the HF Guggenheim Foundation to research land disputes in post-conflict northern Uganda.

She was shortlisted for the 2011 Caine Prize for African Writing and was a finalist for the PEN/Studzinski Literary Award 2009.

== Early life and education ==
Lamwaka was born and raised in Alokolum, Gulu, Uganda. She attended Uganda Martyrs Secondary School, Namugongo, before joining Makerere University to study for a Bachelor of Arts with Education degree. She specialised in literature and English. She went on to pursue a master's degree in human rights from Makerere University.

== Writing career ==
In her third year at Makerere University, she joined FEMRITE, an organisation aimed at developing and promoting women writers. By 2001, her first short story, "Vengeance of the Gods", was published in the anthology Words From A Granary. Later, she penned "Queen of Tobacco", a story of a lady who idolised tobacco smoking. This story was picked up by the British Council after Lamwaka submitted it to Gowanus Books online in the ongoing project "Crossing Borders".

She was shortlisted for the 2011 Caine Prize for her story "Butterfly Dreams". Her short stories have been published in various anthologies, including the Caine Prize anthologies, To See the Mountain and other stories and African Violet and Other Stories (2011). She is also a contributor to the 2019 anthology New Daughters of Africa, edited by Margaret Busby. Among other publications in which Lamwaka's work has appeared are Butterfly Dreams and Other Stories from Uganda, New Writing from Africa 2009, Words from A Granary (2001), World of Our Own, Farming Ashes, Summoning the Rains, Queer Africa: New and Collected Fiction (2013), and PMS poemmemoirstory journal. She is working on her first novel, Sunflowers, and a number of short stories.

== Published works ==
=== Story books ===
- Anena's Victory. Fountain Publishers. 2003. ISBN 9970021893.

=== Short stories ===
- "Chief of the Home", in Karen Martin; Makhosazana Xaba, eds. (2013). Queer Africa: New and Collected Fiction. MaThoko's books. ISBN 9781920590338.
- "Butterfly Dreams", in Hilda Twongyeirwe, ed. (2012). Word of our own and other stories. Femrite Publications. ISBN 9789970700257.
- "Bonding Ceremony", in Hilda Twongyeirwe; Ellen Banda-Aaku, eds. (2012). Summoning the rains. Femrite Publications. ISBN 9789970700257.
- "Butterfly Dreams" and "Bottled Memory", in To See the Mountain and other stories. New Internationalist Publications LTD. 2011. ISBN 9781906523862.
- "Pillar of Love", in African Violet and Other Stories. New Internationalist Publications LTD. 2011. ISBN 9781780260747.
- "Butterfly Dreams", in Emma Dawson, ed. (2010). Butterfly Dreams and Other Stories from Uganda. Typhon Media. ISBN 9789881516589.
- "The Garden of Mushrooms", in Violet Barungi; Hilda Twongyeirwe, eds. (2009). Farming Ashes: Tales of Agony and Resilience. Femrite Publications. ISBN 9789970700202.
- "Village Queen", in Violet Barungi, ed. (2009). Talking Tales. Femrite Publications. ISBN 9789970700219.
- "The Family of Three"; "The Bully"; and "The Garden of Mushrooms", in Women in Warzone Experiences. Femrite Publications. 2009.
- "The Star in My Camp", in Robin Malan, ed. (2009). Writing from Africa 2009. Johnson and Kingjames Books. ISBN 9780620434287.
- "I Always Know", in Painted Voices: A collage of art and poetry, volume II. Femrite Publications. 2009. ISBN 978-9970-700-18-9.
- "Vengeance of Gods", in Violet Barungi, ed. (2001). Words from a Granary. Femrite Publications. ISBN 9789970700011.
- "Butterfly Dreams"
- "Queen of Tobacco", Gowanus Books, 2002

=== Poems ===
- "Mwoc Acoli", "Nyeri", in Beverley Nambozo Nsengiyunva, ed. (2014). A Thousand Voices Rising: An anthology of contemporary African poetry. BN Poetry Foundation. ISBN 978-9970-9234-0-3.
- "The Stars in Gulu", in Painted Voices: A collage of art and poetry, volume II. Femrite Publications. 2009. ISBN 978-9970-700-18-9.

== Awards and recognition ==
- Janzi Awards 2021 (Butterfly Dreams)
- Young Achievers Award 2011 (Art, Culture and Fashion category.
- Laureate for the Council for the Development of Social Science Democratic Governance Institute 2012
- Shortlisted for the Caine Prize for African Writing, 2011.
- Finalist for the PEN/Studzinski Literary Award 2009.
- Fellow for the Harry Frank Guggenheim Foundation, 2009.
