= Beverley Nambozo =

Ugandan writer

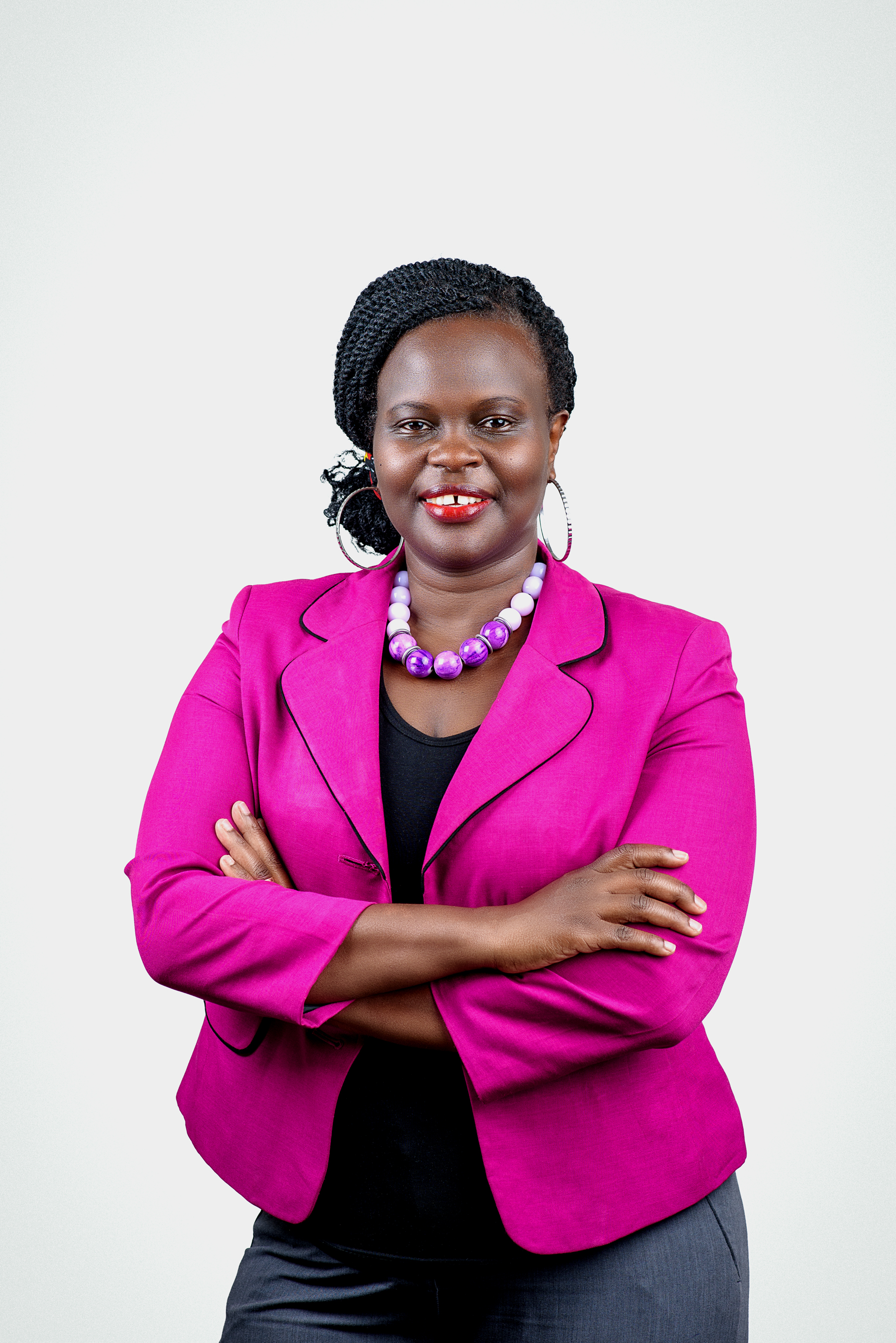
- Born: Uganda
- Education: Kampala parents school, Gayaza High School and Makerere College School
- Alma mater: Lancaster University (Master's degree in creative writing); Makerere University (Bachelor of Education (literature, English)); Alliance Française de Kampala
- Occupation: Writer
- Writing career
- Genres: Poetry, fiction
- Notable work: Unjumping
- Website: walkingdiplomat.blogspot.com

Beverley Nambozo Nsengiyunva is a Ugandan writer, poet, actress, literary activist, and biographer. She is the founder of the Babishai Niwe (BN) Poetry Foundation formerly The Beverley Nambozo Poetry Award for Ugandan women, which began in 2008 as a platform for promoting poetry. It has since grown to include all African poets and runs as an annual poetry award. In 2014, the award will extend to the entire continent, targeting both men and women. The same year, the foundation will also publish an anthology of poetry from poets of Africa. She is also the founder of the Babishai Niwe Women's Leadership Academy. Nambozo joined the Crossing Borders Scheme British Council Uganda in 2003 under the short stories genre. She was nominated for the August 2009 Arts Press Association (APA) Awards for revitalising poetry in Uganda after initiating the Beverley Nambozo Poetry Award, the first poetry award for Ugandan women.

Nambozo has worked at the Eastern African Sub-Regional Support Institute for The Advancement of Women (EASSI), British Council, as a radio show morning host of two years at 104.1 Power FM in Kampala. She also served as an Audience Relations Manager, conducting regular market surveys. Before that she was a teacher and dance instructor at Rainbow International School in Kampala. Since 1999, she has been in an active dance group that usually holds concerts in and around church and the community. Nambozo has also been involved in several HIV/AIDS sensitisation campaigns amongst youth in secondary schools and universities.

== Early life and education ==
Nambozo was born to Herbert Mugoya and Betty Mugoya. Her father was a diplomat and so she lived in the UK for about eight years of her childhood. She studied at Kampala parents school, Gayaza High School and Makerere College School, before joining Makerere University where she received a Bachelor of Education (literature, English) degree. She has a Certificate in French from Alliance Française de Kampala and a master's degree (Distinction) in creative writing from Lancaster University.

Nambozo was a child when she became interested in poetry. Her father was very artistic, being a diplomat who was very well-traveled. He translated his explorations into the home, which influenced her. The schools she attended also supported writing and reciting during assembly, in class and even in the dormitories. She often composed raps or poems for her dormitory or class and weaved them into dance routines.

== Writing ==
Nambozo is a member of FEMRITE and is the author of Unjumping, a chapbook collection of poetry that was published by erbacce-press in 2010 after she emerged a joint first runner-up in their annual poetry competition. Her hybrid play entitled GA-ad, which she wrote collaboratively with Ugandan playwright Judith Adong, featured as the play of the month at the New York National Black Theater in August 2013. Her story "The Best Non-crier on Purley Avenue" was published at postcolonial.org. She participated in the Caine Blogathon.

Her short stories, poetry and articles have been published in Drumvoices Review, Femrite, Kwani?, Enkare Review, Copperfield Review, Postcolonial text, Feast, Famine and Potluck anthology and other local and international journals. Many of her travel articles on visits to Mexico, Lamu, Kenya, Egypt, Lake Mburo National Park, Kingfisher Resort, Queen Elizabeth National Park, and other places have been published in UGPulse and the New Vision newspaper. In 2013, she was shortlisted for the Poetry Foundation Ghana prize for her poem "I Baptise You with My Child's Blood", and longlisted for Short Story Day Africa prize. Her work has been featured on the Pan-African poetry platform Badilisha Poetry Radio. In 2013, she appeared on BBC Radio 3's Cabaret of the Word. Her poem "Lake Nalubaale. Lake she Uganda" was selected as the Uganda poem for the 2014 Commonwealth Games.

== Published works ==
=== Poetry collections ===
- Dress me in Disobedience, Kampala, Babishai Niwe Poetry Foundation.

ISBN 9789913641005

- Unjumping. Liverpool, UK: Embracce-Press Publications. 2010. ISBN 9781906588908.

=== Poems ===
- "I baptize you with my child's blood", "Sseebo gwe Wange", "Lamu", in Beverley Nambozo Nsengiyunva, ed. (2014). A thousand voices rising: An anthology of contemporary African poetry. BN Poetry Foundation. ISBN 978-9970-9234-0-3.
- "Microwave", "I will never be you", in Anthonia C. Kalu; Juliana Makuchi Nfah-Abbenyi; Omofolabo Ajayi-Soyinka, eds. (2013). Reflections: An Anthology of New Work by African women poets. Lynne Rienner Publications. ISBN 978-1-58826-868-6.
- Ha!Ha!Ha!Ha!, in Okaka Dokatum; Rose Rwakasisi, eds. (2009). The Butterfly Dance: words and sounds of colour. Femrite Publications. ISBN 978-9970-700-18-9.
- "Unjumping", in Painted Voices: A collage of art and poetry, volume II. Femrite Publications. 2009. ISBN 978-9970-700-18-9.
- "Bujumbura", Wasafiri, 2015
- "I Baptize You with my Child's Blood", shortlisted for Poetry Foundation Ghana 2013 prize and will be published in the anthology, 2014
- "Nyali Beach-Mombasa, Please Boss", in revistamododeusar.blogspot.com, 2014
- "Lake Nalubaale. Lake she Uganda", Uganda poem, commonwealth games 2014
- Ga-AD, hybrid poetry and theatre with Judith Adong, performed during the 45th reading, Black Series, New York City, 2013.
- "At the Graveyard, Nyali Beach-Mombasa", New Black Magazine, 2011
- "Al Qaeda", "Eloped", "High heels" and "Nyali Beach-Mombasa", published in Loamshire Review, a UK magazine, 2010
- "Dance Partner", "In the Restaurant" and "Crocodile Farm in Mombasa", published in Drumvoices Revue, A confluence of Literary, Cultural and Vision Arts, published by Southern Illinois University English Department, 2007
- "Al Qaeda", published in Kwani? 4, an East African literary journal, 2006

=== Short stories ===
- "Looking", in Jennings, Karen, ed. (2013). Feast, Famine and Potluck. Shortstory day Africa. ISBN 9780620588867.
- "Miss Nandutu", in Violet Barungi, ed. (2001). Words from a Granary. Femrite Publications. ISBN 9789970700011.
- Kampala Kuyiiya, upcoming US academic journal, 2014
- "The best non-crier on 50 Purley Avenue" in Postcolonial Journal, Vol. 8, no. 1 (2013)
- "A Writer is Never a Prisoner", Femrite, 2004
- "My Winter Life", in Copperfield Review, a U.S., publication, 2003
- "Splash", in a Water Anthology launched in Netherlands 2003
- "Samuka Island", in the Dawn Magazine, 2003
- "Writing From The Heart", New Writer magazine, 2003
- "My Winter Life", published in Copperfield Review, an online UK magazine, 2003
- "Splash", published in Water Stories, by the IRC International Water and Sanitation Centre, 2003
