= Angella Emurwon =

Ugandan playwright

- Occupation: Playwright
- Writing career
- Genre: Plays
- Notable works: Sunflowers Behind A Dirty Fence; The Cow Needs A Wife

Angella Emurwon is a Ugandan playwright. She is also a filmmaker, stage director, and a writing mentor.

== Career ==
She graduated from the 2011 Maisha Screenwriting Lab and has since become a mentor, teaching screenwriting across various countries, including Uganda, Kenya, Tanzania, Rwanda, Germany, and Ghana. Since 2014, she has been part of the Maisha Film Lab Mentor Team.

Angella Emurwon's first short film, Sunday (2018), received multiple accolades. It won Best East African Short Film at the 2019 Mashariki African Film Festival in Rwanda, Best National Short at the 2019 Gulu International Film Festival in Uganda, and 2nd prize in the Films by Women category at the Ndiva Women’s Film Festival in Ghana. The film was also selected for several prestigious festivals, including the Durban Film Festival, Silicon Valley African Film Festival, and Ngalabi Short Film Festival.

She won the 2012 International Playwriting Competition first prize in the English as a Second Language category for her play Sunflowers Behind A Dirty Fence, in the 23rd International Playwriting Competition held by the BBC World Service and the British Council, in partnership with Commonwealth Writers. Her play The Cow Needs A Wife came third in the 2010 BBC African Performance Play Writing Competition.

== Bibliography ==
=== Plays ===
- Sunflowers Behind A Dirty Fence, 2012
- The Cow Needs A Wife, 2010

=== Short stories ===
- "Love puzzle"
