= Ellah Wakatama Allfrey =

Zimbabwean editor and literary critic (born 1966)

Ellah Wakatama Allfrey OBE, Hon. FRSL
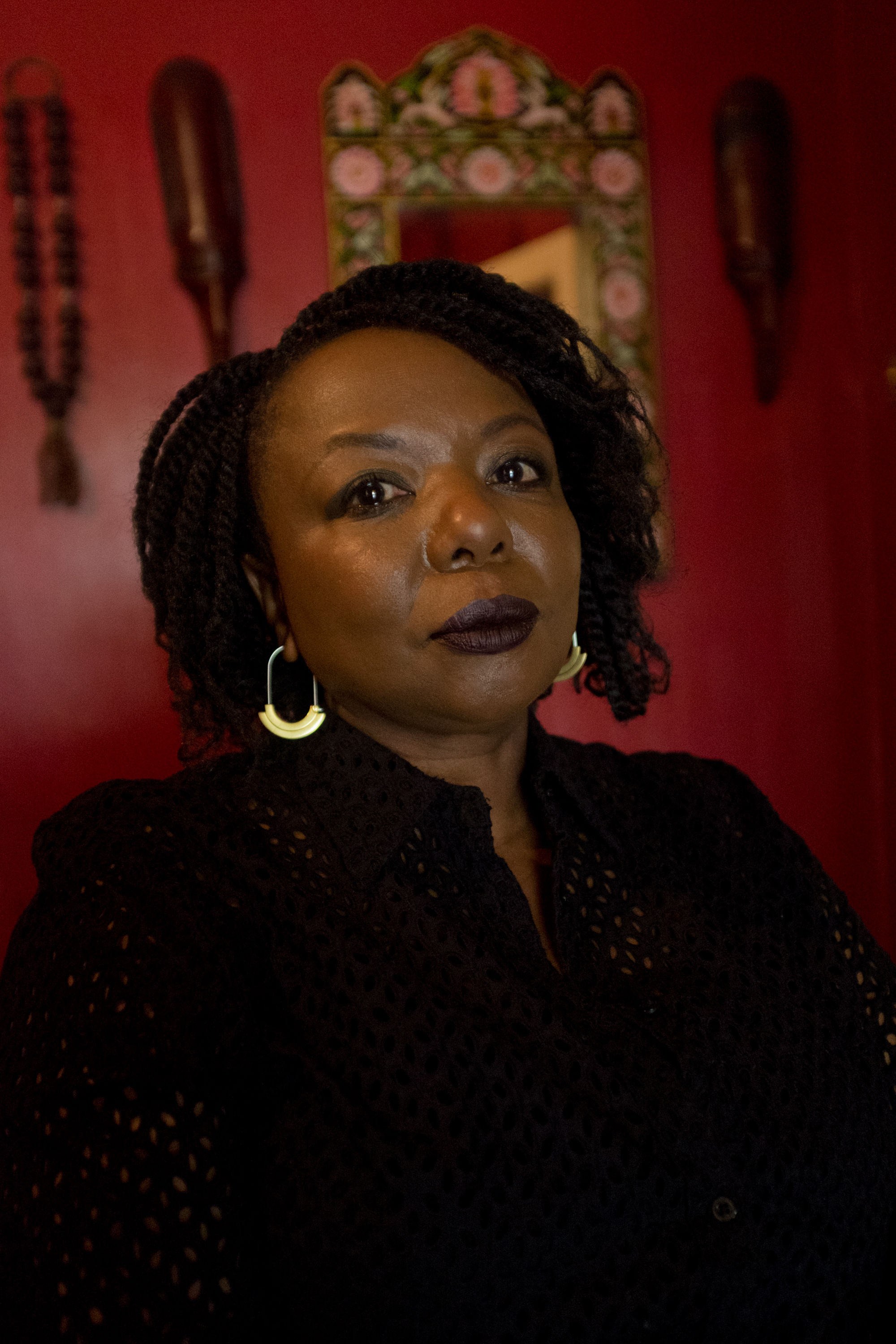
- Ellah Wakatama Allfrey (photo by Julian Knox)
- Born: Ellah Wakatama; 16 September 1966 (age 60); Salisbury, Rhodesia (now Harare, Zimbabwe)
- Other names: Ellah Allfrey; Shava, Musiyamwa (Address: vaChihera)
- Education: Arundel School; Goshen College (BA); Rutgers University (MA)
- Occupations: Literary editor and publisher
- Known for: Publishing
- Spouse: Richard Allfrey

Ellah Wakatama Allfrey, OBE, Hon. FRSL (née Wakatama; born 16 September 1966), is the Editor-at-Large at Canongate Books, a senior Research Fellow at Manchester University, and Chair of the AKO Caine Prize for African Writing. She was the founding Publishing Director of the Indigo Press. A London-based editor and critic, she was on the judging panel of the 2017 International Dublin Literary Award and the 2015 Man Booker Prize. In 2016, she was a Visiting Professor & Global Intercultural Scholar at Goshen College, Indiana, and was the Guest Master for the 2016 Gabriel Garcia Marquez Foundation international journalism fellowship in Cartagena, Colombia. The former deputy editor of Granta magazine, she was the senior editor at Jonathan Cape, Random House and an assistant editor at Penguin. She is the series editor of the Kwani? Manuscript Project and the editor of the anthologies Africa39 (Bloomsbury, 2014) and Safe House: Explorations in Creative Nonfiction (Dundurn/Cassava Republic).

Her journalism has appeared in the Telegraph, Guardian and Observer newspapers as well as in the Spectator and The Griffith Review magazines. She is also a contributor to the 2019 anthology New Daughters of Africa. She has also been a regular contributor to the book pages of NPR. Her broadcasting includes reviews for NPR’s All Things Considered and BBC Radio 4's Saturday Review. She sat on the selection panel for the Rockefeller Foundation Bellagio Fellowship for seven years and served as a literature selector for the Rolex 2014-15 Mentor & Protégée Initiative, as well as serving as chair of the Miles Morland Foundation Scholarship Selection panel for three years. She sits on the advisory board for Art for Amnesty and the Editorial Advisory Panel of The Johannesburg Review of Books and thelagosreview.ng. In 2011, she was appointed an Officer of the Order of the British Empire (OBE) for services to the publishing industry and in 2019, she was made an Honorary Fellow of the Royal Society of Literature.

== Biography ==
Born in Salisbury, Rhodesia, on 16 September 1966 to Zimbabwean novelist, journalist and publisher Pius Wakatama and entrepreneur and Christian women's rights activist Winnie Wakatama (née Ndoro), Ellah Wakatama spent her formative years between Salisbury and the midwestern USA while her father studied at the University of Iowa. She returned to Rhodesia at the age of 10, attending Arundel School. Her return to America was prompted by her college education, which began at Goshen College, where she received a BA in Journalism, ending at Rutgers University, where she earned an MA from the School of Communication, Information and Library Studies.

She now resides in London, UK, working as Editor-at-Large at Canongate Books, Research Fellow at the University of Manchester, and Chair of the Caine Prize for African Writing.

She is the sister of writer and natural-birth campaigner Mavhu Farai Wakatama Hargrove and of the late Nhamu Wakatama and Richard Wakatama. Wakatama married fellow Goshen College graduate Richard Allfrey, with whom she has a daughter.

== Awards ==
A Fellow of the Royal Society of the Arts, Allfrey was appointed an OBE in the 2011 New Year Honours for services to the publishing industry.

In 2019, she was elected an Honorary Fellow of the Royal Society of Literature.

She was named Brittle Paper's "African Literary Person of the Year 2019", an award recognizing individuals who work behind the scenes to hold up the African literary establishment.

== Selected articles and essays ==
- Review of Call It Dog by Marli Roode (The Guardian, 28 August 2013)
- "The great Chinua Achebe was the man who gave Africa a voice" (The Observer, 24 March 2013)
- "All Hail the African Renaissance" (The Telegraph, 9 September 2011)
- "The cultural battle gave us books and music of genius" (The Observer, 13 April 2013)
- "Writers need new ways of talking about Africa's past and present" (The Guardian, 4 June 2016)
- "Longchase" (New Daughters of Africa, 2019)

== Podcasts/video ==
- Guardian Books podcast: Political fiction, 5 April 2013
- Ellah Wakatama Allfrey on Behind the Headlines, 3 January 2011.
- Ellah Allfrey talks with Audible about the fourth edition of Granta's "Best of Young British Novelists".

== Opinion ==
- "The 10 best contemporary African books". The Observer, 26 August 2012.
- Quoted by Parselo Kantai, Nairobi, in "Publishing: Book ends and new beginnings", The Africa Report, 8 February 2012.
- "No Violet: From the African Booker to the Booker longlist"(quote)

== Interviews ==
- "Ellah Wakatama Allfrey OBE on Behind the Headlines", SW Radio Africa, 3 January 2011.
- "Ellah Wakatama Allfrey, Granta in Nairobi, Kenya".
- Nyana Kakoma, "Ellah Wakatama Allfrey on how she became an editor and why editing should be professionalised", African Writers Trust, 30 June 2014.
- "...Publishers themselves and Gate-Keepers need to me more creative." An Interview with Ellah Wakatama Allfrey, Short Story Day Africa, 30 November 2016.

== Collaborations ==
- African Writers Trust Literary Feast, Uganda, May 2012.
- Literary week Nairobi, judge.
- Judge for Kwani? Manuscript Project – literary prize for unpublished fiction by African writers.
- "The Trans-Atlantic, the Diaspora, and Africa" participant. – conference hosted by Oxford University Research Centre for the Humanities, to discuss the newest theoretical scholarship emerging from the interdisciplinary fields of USA-derived Diaspora Studies and British-derived Trans-Atlantic Studies, and how these fields have diverged and converged in relation to the idea of Africa.
- Patron of Etisalat Prize for Literature – pan-African prize celebrating first-time African writers of published books of fiction.
- Judge for 2014 Commonwealth Short Story Prize – award for the best piece of unpublished short fiction (2000–5000 words) in English.
- Wasafiri magazine (contributor), Volume 22, Issue 3, 2007.
- Interviewer – Binyavanga Wainaina's Book Launch
- Peter Godwin, The Fear: The Last Days of Robert Mugabe (acknowledgements).
- Judge for 2010 Caine Prize for African Writing.
- Introduction to Kojo Laing, Woman of the Aeroplanes.
- Judge 2011 for David Cohen Prize for Literature.
- Editor of Africa39: New Writing from Africa South of the Sahara (2014), with a Preface by Wole Soyinka
- Judge 2015 for Man Booker Prize
- Editor of Safe House: Explorations in Creative Nonfiction (Cassava Republic Press, 2016)
- Interview with Margaret Busby, Wasafiri, November 2017.
