= Regina Amollo =

Ugandan writer

- Born: 1954 (age 70–71); Uganda
- Occupation: Writer
- Notable work: A Season of Mirth, When Mother Leaves Home, The Pain of Borrowing

Regina Amollo (born c. 1954) is a Ugandan writer.

== Biography ==
Trained as a nurse, Amollo started writing her first novel, A Season of Mirth, in 1976. She was encouraged to complete the manuscript by one of her professors, Austin Ejiet, but it took until 1999 for the book to be published. The book, which explores male chauvinism and women's oppression in Uganda, is now required reading for Ugandan students.

Amollo retired from nursing in 2009. She has published several other books, including When Mother Leaves Home and The Pain of Borrowing. She wrote a two-volume primer for the Kumam language, Pwonyo Isoma Itabu Me Agege, and published an anthology of stories by women writers entitled Those Days in Iganga.
