= Mildred Barya =

Ugandan writer and poet

- Born: Mildred Kiconco Barya; Kabale District, Uganda
- Education: Makerere University
- Occupation: Writer
- Writing career
- Genre: Poetry
- Notable works: The Price of Memory: After the Tsunami, Give Me Room to Move My Feet
- Website: mildredbarya.com

Mildred Kiconco Barya is a writer and poet from Uganda. She was awarded the 2008 Pan African Literary Forum Prize for Africana Fiction, and earlier gained recognition for her poetry, particularly her first two collections, Men Love Chocolates But They Don't Say (2002) and The Price of Memory: After the Tsunami (2006).

Barya has also worked as journalist and travel writer. From August 2007 to August 2009, she served as Writer-in-Residence at TrustAfrica, a Pan-African foundation based in Dakar, Senegal. She graduated from MFA program at Syracuse University, New York, in 2012, a PhD in Creative Writing at the University of Denver in 2016. She had been a member of the Creative Writing Faculty at Alabama School of Fine Arts (ASFA). She has lived and worked in Germany, Botswana, Kenya and Uganda.

Besides her career as a writer, Barya has also worked as a Human Resource Advisor for Ernst & Young in Uganda, and currently teaches Creative Writing as a faculty member of the University of North Carolina at Asheville.

Barya is a founding member and serves on the advisory board of African Writers Trust, "a non-profit entity which seeks to coordinate and bring together African writers in the Diaspora and writers on the continent to promote sharing of skills and other resources, and to foster knowledge and learning between the two groups."

== Education ==
Born in Kabale District in southwest Uganda, Barya attended Mwisi Primary School and Kigezi High School. In 1996, she was awarded a full government scholarship to attend Makerere University in Uganda. She graduated in 1999 with a BA in Literature. She also while at college joined FEMRITE—Uganda Women Writers Association, where she worked closely with Goretti Kyomuhendo, then Program Coordinator, and Violet Barungi, then FEMRITE editor.

In 2000, Barya took certificate courses in Information, Communication and Globalisation at the International Women's University, Vifu, in Hamburg, Germany. In 2002, she studied Editorial Practices and Publishing Management at Moi University, Eldoret, Kenya. From 2002 to 2004, she rejoined Makerere University to earn a master's degree in Organisational Psychology.

In 2006–2007, Barya held a writer's residence fellowship at the Per Sesh Writing Program in Popenguine, Senegal, under the instruction of Ayi Kwei Armah.

== Writing and critical reception ==
Barya's first published collection of poems, Men Love Chocolates But They Don't Say, won the Ugandan National Book Trust Award for 2002. Her second collection, The Price of Memory: After the Tsunami, also received favourable critical attention as shown by the two reviews cited below.

Yusuf Serunkuma Kajura, a reviewer for The Weekly Observer (Uganda) claimed that Barya's "poetry blossoms on indigenous African imagery, rhetorical devices and ideas, easily comparable to Okot p'Bitek's long poem, Song of Lawino." But Barya's poetry "is an enthusiastic trumpet, subtly blown for the woman in society, unlike Lawino's defence of the traditional African values."

Gaaki Kigambo, a reviewer for Uganda's Sunday Monitor, claimed that "Barya's subjects are informed by the things we are used to. In this era of mobile telephony, everyone will identify with Mathematically Proven Love." Kigambo also stated that such poetry "reveals the romanticist in Barya."

Regarding Barya's third collection of poems, Give Me Room To Move My Feet (2009), Peter Nazareth, Professor of English at the University of Iowa, USA, claimed that "the poet breaks down and mends herself through spirituality, religion, and poetry, bringing back to life what seemed to be dead" and that Barya "never stops loving Mother Africa."

Barya's short fiction has appeared in FEMRITE anthologies, Commonwealth Broadcasting Association, African Love Stories, Picador Africa, and Pambazuka News. An excerpt from her novel What Was Left Behind earned her the 2008 Pan African Literary Forum Prize for Africana Fiction, as judged by Junot Díaz, the Dominican-American Pulitzer Prize-winning fiction writer and essayist. She is a contributor to the 2019 anthology New Daughters of Africa, edited by Margaret Busby.

== Awards ==
- 2008: Pan African Literary Forum Prize for Africana Fiction
- 2015: Sylt Foundation African Writer´s Residency Award
- 2020: Linda Flowers Literary Award for creative non-fiction entry "Being Here in This Body"

== Published works ==
=== Poetry ===
- Men Love Chocolates But They Don't Say. Uganda: New Vision Publications. 2002. ISBN 9970-9888-0-8.
- The Price of Memory: After the Tsunami. Devon, UK: Mallory Publishing. 2006. ISBN 1-85657-102-5.
- Give Me Room To Move My Feet. Dakar, Senegal: Amalion Publishing. 2009. ISBN 978-2-35926-001-4.
- "A fragile heart", "If I was" in Painted Voices: A collage of art and poetry, volume II. Femrite Publications. 2009. ISBN 978-9970-700-18-9.
- "Stormy heart", in Beverley Nambozo Nsengiyunva, ed. (2014). A thousand voices rising: An anthology of contemporary African poetry. BN Poetry Foundation. ISBN 978-9970-9234-0-3.
- Hands in Clay. Raleigh, NC: Serving House Books. 2026. ISBN 978-1947175990.

=== Short fiction ===
- "Raindrops", in Violet Barungi, ed. (2001). Words from a Granary. FEMRITE Publications. ISBN 9970-700-01-4.
- "Scars of Earth", in Ama Ata Aidoo, ed. (2006). African Love Stories. Oxfordshire, UK: Ayebia Clarke Publishing. ISBN 0-9547023-6-0.
- "Effigy Child", in Violet Barungi, ed. (2006). Gifts of Harvest. FEMRITE Publications. ISBN 978-9970700042.
- "Effigy Child", in Helon Habila & Kadija Sesay, ed. (2008). Dreams, Miracles & Jazz. Picador Africa. ISBN 978-1-77010-025-1.
- "What was left of us", in Pambazuka News, 2008.
- "Black Stone", in Per Contra: An International Journal of the Arts, Literature, and Ideas, 2012. Reprinted in New Daughters of Africa, Margaret Busby, ed., 2019.

=== As editor ===
- Boda Boda Anthem and Other Poems: A Kampala Poetry Anthology; a Babishai Niwe (BN) Poetry Anthology. Gilgal Media Arts, 2015. ISBN 9789970923427.
