= Rose Rwakasisi =

Ugandan writer

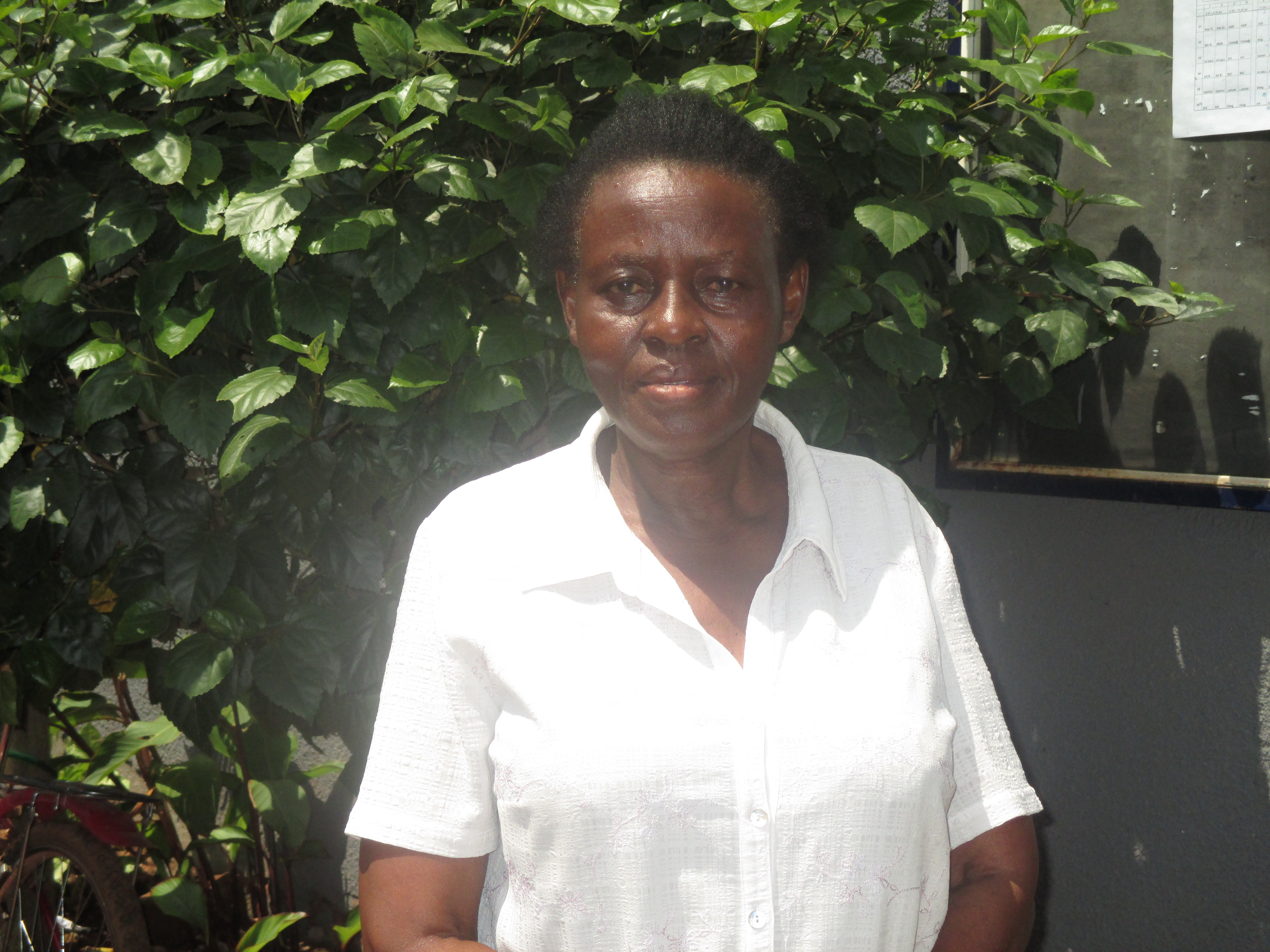
- Born: 1945 (age 80–81); Buhweju District Uganda
- Occupation: writer
- Writing career
- Genre: Fiction

Rose Rwakasisi (born 1945) is a Ugandan author, editor, short story writer, curriculum developer and educator. She was the deputy head teacher of Old Kampala Secondary school, Nakasero secondary school and Kyamate Secondary School in Ntungamo. She is the director of St. Luke secondary schools and a teacher of Biology.

== Early life and education ==
Rwakasisi was born in Buhweju District, Uganda. She holds a degree in botany and zoology and a postgraduate diploma in education. She was awarded a certificate of recognition by the National Book Trust of Uganda for her contribution to children's literature.

== Published works ==
=== Books ===
- The Great Escape. Uganda Children's Writers and Illustrators Association.
- How Rats Escaped the Trap. Fountain Publishers. 2005. ISBN 9970-02-474-4.
- How Goats Lost their Beautiful Tails (Our heritage). Fountain Publishers. 2004. ISBN 978-9970024360.
- Gift for the Singer. Fountain Publishers. 2003. ISBN 9789970022533.
- Why Mother Left Home. Fountain Publishers. 2003. ISBN 9789970023967.
- The Boy who Became King. Uganda Children's Writers and Illustrators Association. 2003. with Violet Barungi
- The Promise. Uganda Children's Writers and Illustrators Association. 2002. with Violet Barungi
- Sunshine after Rain. Fountain Publishers. 2002. ISBN 978-9970023837.
- The Old Woman and the Shell. Fountain Publishers. 1994. ISBN 978-9970020508.
- How Friends Became Enemies. Fountain Publishers. 1993. ISBN 978-9970020232.

=== Short stories ===
- "In God's palm", in Hilda Twongyeirwe, ed. (2012). I Dare Say: African Women Share Their Stories of Hope and Survival. Lawrence Hill Books/Chicago. ISBN 978-1-56976-842-6.
- "Serina", in Hilda Twongyeirwe and Aaron Mushengyezi, ed. (2011). Never Too Late. Femrite Publications. ISBN 9789970700233.
- "Yesterday's heroes", in Violet Barungi, ed. (2009). Talking Tales. Femrite Publications. ISBN 9789970700219.
- "The leopardess", in Violet Barungi, ed. (2001). Words from a granary. Femrite Publications. ISBN 9789970700011.
- "MwAna Mugimu nursing sister's child", in Your Companion in the Absence of a Doctor. Femrite Publications.

=== Educational books ===
- UCE Revision Biology: Questions & Answers. Fountain Publishers. 2003. ISBN 9970-02-406-X.

== See also ==
- Buhweju District
- List of Uganda Women Writers
