= Clifton Gachagua =

Kenyan poet and writer

Clifton Gachagua (born 1987) is a Kenyan poet and novelist.

== Biography ==
Born in 1987, Gachagua grew up in Nairobi, Kenya, and studied biotechnology at Maseno University. His books include the poetry collection The Madman at Kilifi, published by University of Nebraska Press and in Senegal by Amallion Publishers, and the novel Zephyrion. Madman at Kilifi was the winner of the inaugural Sillerman First Book Prize for African Poets, and Zephyrion was shortlisted for the Kwani? Manuscript Project. Gachagua was also chosen for Africa39, a 2014 initiative that selected 39 African writers under the age of 40 "with the potential to define the literature of the future".

Since 2013, he has worked at Kwani? as an assistant editor.
