= Femrite =

NGO based in Kampala, Uganda

FEMRITE – Uganda Women Writers' Association
- Formation: 1995
- Type: Non-governmental organization
- Headquarters: Kampala, Uganda
- Region served: Uganda, East Africa
- Website: Official website

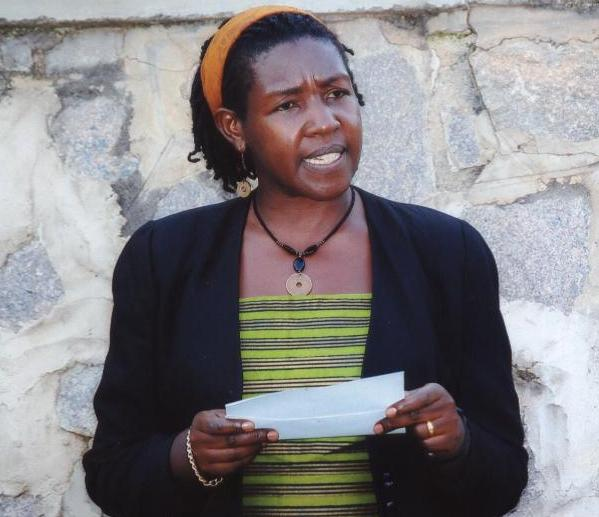
Hilda Twongyeirwe at a public reading at the Femrite regional residence for African women writers

FEMRITE – Uganda Women Writers' Association, founded in 1995, is an NGO based in Kampala, Uganda, whose programmes focus on developing and publishing women writers in Uganda and—more recently—in the East African region. FEMRITE has likewise expanded its concerns to East African issues regarding the environment, literacy, education, health, women's rights and good governance.

== History ==
FEMRITE was founded in 1995 by Mary Karooro Okurut, currently (as of 2011) a member of the 8th Parliament of Uganda, but at that time a lecturer at Makerere University. Okurut was joined by Lillian Tindyebwa, Ayeta Anne Wangusa, Susan Nalugwa Kiguli, Martha Ngabirano, Margaret Ntakalimaze, Rosemary Kyarimpa, Hilda Twongyeirwe, Philomena Rwabukuku and Judith Kakonge.

FEMRITE was officially launched as a Non-Governmental Organization on 3 May 1996. Goretti Kyomuhendo, who would later found African Writers Trust, served as FEMRITE's first coordinator. Other notable early members include Beverley Nambozo, Glaydah Namukasa, Beatrice Lamwaka, Doreen Baingana, Violet Barungi, Mildred Barya (also known as Mildred Kiconco), and Jackee Budesta Batanda. In 1998, FEMRITE joined the African Books Collective, a non-profit distribution and marketing collective owned by African publishers.

Of FEMRITE's origins and mission, Kyomuhendo, in a 2003 interview with Feminist Africa, stated: "To talk about FEMRITE is to talk about Uganda's literary scene, about Ugandan politics, and especially about the connections between women, politics and writing in Uganda."

== Major achievements of FEMRITE members and alumni ==
- Monica Arac de Nyeko won the Caine Prize in 2007; Doreen Baingana was shortlisted for the same prize in 2005; Beatrice Lamwaka was shortlisted in 2011
- Doreen Baingana won the Commonwealth Writers Prize for First Best Book, Africa Region (2006); Baingana was also shortlisted for the Hurston/Wright Legacy Award in the Debut Fiction category (2006).
- Violet Barungi won the British Council International New Play Writing Award for Africa and the Middle East (1997).
- Mildred Barya won the Pan-African Literary Forum Award for Africana Fiction (2008).
- Jackee Budesta Batanda won the Commonwealth Short Story Competition, Africa Region (2003).
- Goretti Kyomuhendo (novel: 1999), Susan Kiguli (poetry: 1999), Mary Karoro Okurut (novel: 2003), and Mildred Barya (poetry: 2003) won the National Book Trust of Uganda Literary Award.
- Beatrice Lamwaka was shortlisted for the 2009 PEN/Studzinsky Literary Award (2009).
- Glaydah Namukasa won the Macmillan Writers Prize for Africa, Senior Category (2005).

== Public response to FEMRITE programmes ==
FEMRITE, as reported by various journalists, has been active in Uganda and the greater East African region in the areas of promoting literacy, educational reform, women's rights, and good governance. These activities have generally received positive notice.

- Emmanuel Ssejjengo, as reported in AllAfrica.com for 14 July 2011, stated that "the FEMRITE Literary Week" was "one of the most celebrated events in Uganda's literary arts."
- Dennis Muhumuza, in the Daily Monitor (Uganda), 23 July 2011, discussed FEMRITE's influence on Uganda's National Curriculum Development Centre (NCDC), and the resulting inclusion of more Ugandan works of literature in the high school and college curriculum.
- Muhumuza, also for the Daily Monitor (Uganda) on 9 January 2011, reviewed the FEMRITE anthology Pumpkin Seeds and Other Gifts: Stories from the FEMRITE Regional Writers Residency, 2008 (ISBN 978-9970700226), calling it a "delicious treasure" that "you will want to take along with you on a journey, or cuddle on the sofa and read in the beauty of solitude, or even read aloud to your children around the fireplace."
- Halima Abdallah, in The East African (Kenya), 14 August 2011, reviewed the FEMRITE anthology Never Too Late (ISBN 9789970700233), concerning the AIDS/HIV epidemic, declaring it "a must read for all age groups as it raises questions and most times provides answers that require collective action" while noting that the collection was "born out of a desire by Femrite to generate literature for positive change aimed at addressing social issues facing not just the youth but society at large."
- Dora Byamukama for New Vision (Uganda) favourably reviewed the FEMRITE collection of non-fiction stories Beyond the Dance: Voices of women on female genital mutilation (ISBN 9789970700196), and stated that the testimonies presented "call for support to end the practice of female genital mutilation (FGM)."
- The American news programme Wide Angle (PBS) featured FEMRITE's collaboration with IRIN, the humanitarian news and analysis service of the United Nations Office, to produce Today You Will Understand, a collection of the personal war stories of 16 women affected by the Lord's Resistance Army rebellion.
- Also commenting on Today You Will Understand, Martyn Drakard for the Observer (Uganda) on 10 December 2008 stated that the collection is "a voice for the voiceless" and "Compulsory reading for anyone wanting to know how the LRA war has affected people’s lives".
- David Kaiza, in a 2007 editorial entitled "Women writers rule" for The East African also discussed albeit somewhat sardonically the growing regional impact of FEMRITE.

== See also ==
- African Writers Trust
- African Books Collective
- Mary Karooro Okurut
