= African Writers Trust =

Non-profit literary organization

African Writers Trust (AWT)
- Formation: 2009; 17 years ago
- Founder: Goretti Kyomuhendo
- Purpose: To bring together writers in Africa and the African diaspora in order to promote sharing of skills and other resources
- Location: Plot 819, Off Kiira Road, Kyaliwajjala – Namugongo (P.O. Box 6753), Kampala, Uganda
- Website: africanwriterstrust.org

The African Writers Trust (AWT) was established in 2009 as "a non-profit entity which seeks to coordinate and bring together African writers in the Diaspora and writers on the continent to promote sharing of skills and other resources, and to foster knowledge and learning between the two groups."

The founder and current director of AWT is Goretti Kyomuhendo, an internationally recognized novelist with a distinguished career as the first Programmers Coordinator for FEMRITE – Uganda Women Writers' Association.

African Writers Trust is governed by its advisory board, currently (as of 2017) composed of Zakes Mda, Susan Nalugwa Kiguli, Ayeta Anne Wangusa, Helon Habila, Leila Aboulela, Mildred Barya, and Aminatta Forna.

== Activities ==
Although presently headquartered in London, England, African Writers Trust has so far (as of 2011) conducted its activities primarily in East Africa based in part upon that region's perceived needs and opportunities.

Diana Nabiruma, of The Observer (Uganda), reported on the fiction workshop and competition organized by the AWT and held at the Uganda Museum in February 2010. On the same, The Standard (Uganda Christian University's community newspaper) reported on the success of the Uganda Christian University student writers who attended.

Martin Kanyegirire, also of The Observer (Uganda), reported on a follow-up one-day workshop held by AWT in January 2011 that involved 20 student-writers from three East African universities.

Since 2013, the AWT has held the biennial Uganda International Writers Conference, with participating international writers. The 2017 conference, on the theme "Contemporary Publishing Trends in Africa", featured a keynote address by Bibi Bakare-Yusuf of Cassava Republic Press, and a poetry performance by British-Ethiopian poet Lemn Sissay.

== Projections and progress assessment ==
According to the African Writers Trust website, the organization's projected activities and programmes include establishing a Creative Writing School in Uganda, holding the African Writers Trust workshop and competition on an annual basis and in a different nation each year, establishing a Writer's Fund to allow an established African Diaspora writer to spend a semester at an African university teaching students creative writing, and the like.

In regard largely to the same, Advisory Board member Mildred Barya has written a personal reflection published in Pambazuka News on the growing pains of AWT, the challenges of finding funding and support, and her assessment of what the organization can contribute.

In a 22 May 2011 interview with Caine Prize nominee Beatrice Lamwaka for AfroLit, current Director Goretti Kyomuhendo offered her own assessment of progress-to-date and future expectations for AWT: "Its mission is to build and sustain a strong supportive network for African writers in Africa and in the Diaspora. As you know, there are many hurdles that African writers have to grapple with in order to achieve their writing and publishing dream. These include lack of or limited publishing opportunities, professional writing skills development, supportive structures to develop and grow as writers and to sustain their creative processes and productions, lack of information on publishing and other resources for writers, lack of cross-border movement of books, and many others. We plan to address some of these problems, so I hope in ten years, we shall have made a difference for African writers."
