= Ndiva Women's Film Festival =

Annual film festival

Ndiva Women's Film Festival (NWFF)
- Location: Accra, Ghana
- Founded: 2017
- Website: www.ndivawff.org

The Ndiva Women's Film Festival (NWFF) is an African film festival for women filmmakers and audiences, established in Accra, Ghana in 2017. The founder and executive director of NWFF is Aseye Tamakloe. The festival distinguishes three categories: film by women, films for women by women and films by men about women.

== Editions ==
=== 2017 ===
The first NWFF, targeted at African women filmmakers and women of African descent, ran from 1–3 November 2017.

=== 2018 ===
The scope of the second NWFF, held 1–3 November 2018, was widened to include women filmmakers worldwide. The opening film was The Life of Esteban by Inés Eshun and the closing film was Potato Potahto by Shirley Frimpong Manso.

=== 2019 ===
The third edition of the NWFF took place on from 28 October to 2 November 2019. This also included a five day workshop in Screen writing and Directing for women screen writers and film directors, panel discussions and an awards ceremony.

=== 2024 ===
In 2024, the NWFF took place from 9 to 11 August at the Goethe Institut in Accra. It featured the following films:

- Shimoni by Angela Wamai (opening film)
- In Our Hearts by Kwame Addae
- Never Again by Mario Dahl
- Miraculous Weapons by Jean Pierre Bekolo
- Battle of our voices by Jennifer Mallman
- Number 1 by Kwesi Appenteng-Mensah
- Lost by Erica Owusu-Ansah
- The Last Shelter by Ousmane Samassekou
- The Gentleman by Asaye Fiagbe
- Postpartum by Henriette Rietz
- Finding Sally by Tamara Dawit
- Das Wunder Von Taipeh by John David Seidler
- Loud Silence by Cecilia Avorkliyah
- Die Unbeugsamen by Torsten Körner
- The Ghost and the House of Truth by Akin Omotose
- The Kids are not Alright by Uche Aguh and Dennis Schmitz
- Ebu by Thompson Lordson
- Chasing Lullaby by Shirley Frimpong-Manso

== See also ==
- List of women's film festivals
