= Susan Nalugwa Kiguli =

Ugandan poet and literary scholar (born 1969)

- Born: Susan Nalugwa Kiguli; 24 June 1969 (age 57); Luweero District, Uganda
- Education: Makerere University,
- Occupations: Academic, writer
- Writing career
- Genre: Poetry
- Notable work: The African Saga

Susan Nalugwa Kiguli (born 24 June 1969 in Luweero District, Uganda) is a Ugandan poet and literary scholar. She is an associate professor of literature at Makerere University. Kiguli has been an advocate for creative writing in Africa, including service as a founding member of FEMRITE, a judge for the Commonwealth Writers' Prize (African Region, 1999), and an advisory board member for the African Writers Trust. As a poet, Kiguli is best known for her 1998 collection The African Saga, as a scholar, and for her work on oral poetry and performance.

== Education ==
- 2005: Doctor of Philosophy in English, The University of Leeds, Leeds, United Kingdom
- 1996: Master of Science in literary linguistics for teaching English language and literature, University of Strathclyde, Glasgow, United Kingdom
- 1994: Master of Arts in literature, Makerere University, Kampala, Uganda
- 1991: Bachelor of Arts education, Makerere University

== Poetry and performances ==
Kiguli has participated as a poet and reader in numerous literary festivals and conferences, including the International Literature Festival Berlin (2008); the Poetry Africa Festival in Kwazulu–Natal, South Africa (2009); the World Social Forum in Nairobi, Kenya (2007); and the Leeds Centre for African Studies, University of Leeds, United Kingdom (2005).

In addition to her critically acclaimed collection The African Saga, which won the National Book Trust of Uganda Poetry Award (1999), Kiguli has also written poems for children – four of which were featured by Books LIVE, as "Animal Portraits by Susan Kiguli (Note of Affection No. 4, Love Africa Carnival)" and selected by readers as "one of the most loved Love Notes of its month." Kiguli has discussed her own childhood reading experiences in an interview with BooksLIVE.

Kiguli has also contributed poetry for children to the collection Michael's Eyes: The War against the Ugandan Child, an international collaborative effort "intended to raise the global awareness of the situation in Northern Uganda," particularly concerning the troubles caused by the Lord's Resistance Army.

Kiguli's poems were also featured in Eye of the Storm: A Photographic Journey Across Uganda, with photography by David Pluth and Pierre-Francois Didek.

Kiguli has also been featured by Ultra Violet: Indian feminists unplugged, and by Department of English & Creative Writing, Lancaster University. Her work is included in the 2019 anthology New Daughters of Africa, edited by Margaret Busby.

== Scholarship and criticism ==
Praised by the poet and critic Alex Smith as "the leading intellectually astute voice in contemporary East African poetry," Kiguli was an American Council of Learned Societies Fellow for 2010, with her research focusing on "Oral Poetry and Popular Song in South Africa and Uganda: A Study of Contemporary Performance.”

On the same general topic, Kiguli’s recent intellectual contributions include “The Symbolism of Music Festivals in Buganda: The case of Ekitoobero and Enkuuka y’omwaka,” in Performing Community (2008) and "Mapping the Dream of Cultural Continuity: Songs at Enkuuka y’omwaka” in Performing Change (2009).

Alex Smith also found noteworthy Kiguli's comments on A Hundred Silences, the third collection of poems by Gabeba Baderoon.

== Published works ==
=== Anthologies ===
- Home Floats in the Distance. Wunderhorn; Auflage. 2012. ISBN 978-3884234044.
- The African Saga. Femrite Publications. 1998. ISBN 9789970901005.

=== Poems ===
- "I laugh at Amin","My mother in three photographs" in Beverley Nambozo Nsengiyunva, ed. (2014). A thousand voices rising: An anthology of contemporary African poetry. BN Poetry Foundation. ISBN 978-9970-9234-0-3.
- "Weeping landa" in Painted Voices: A collage of art and poetry, volume II. Femrite Publications. 2009. ISBN 978-9970-700-18-9.
