= Ayeta Anne Wangusa =

Ugandan writer and activist

- Born: 9 September 1971 (age 55); Kampala, Uganda
- Education: Makerere University; University of Leicester
- Occupations: Writer and activist
- Known for: Social development, governance, and women's rights
- Notable work: Memoirs of a Mother; Tears of Hope: A Collection of Short Stories by Ugandan Rural Women

Ayeta Anne Wangusa (born 9 September 1971) is a Ugandan writer and activist. A founding member (1995) of FEMRITE, the Uganda Women Writers Association, Wangusa first achieved broader recognition in literary circles for her novel Memoirs of a Mother (1998). She was also a founding member (2009) of the African Writers Trust, currently (as of 2018) serving on the advisory board. She is a contributor to the 2019 anthology New Daughters of Africa, edited by Margaret Busby.

In addition to her literary career, which includes having co=edited with Violet BarungiTears of Hope: A Collection of Short Stories by Ugandan Rural Women (2002), Wangusa has had a parallel career in social development, governance, and women's rights.

== Professional activities ==
Since July 2009, Wangusa has worked with SNV - Netherlands Development Organization in Tanzania as Governance Advisor (Media) for the Public Accountability Tanzania Initiative. Previously, she worked with SNV in Tanzania as Civil Society Strengthening advisor, July 2006 to July 2009.

From October 2004 to March 2006, Wangusa served as Project Officer Development and Implementation, Open Knowledge Network, with the African Medical and Research Foundation (AMREF) in Tanzania.

From December 1996 to December 2003, Wangusa worked with New Vision Printing and Publishing Corporation, Uganda, as a features sub-editor, and in August – December 1996, she served as books editor with Fountain Publishers Ltd, Uganda.

== Honours, appointments and awards ==
From 2009 to 2011, Wangusa served as Coordinator of the Gender and Women's Rights Workshop of the Commonwealth Peoples' Forum, Perth, Australia, and Commonwealth Civil Society Advisory Committee Member (CSAC), representing the East African region.

Wangusa was selected by New Partnership for Africa's Development (NEPAD) to be part of the expert pool on Capacity Development and Knowledge Exchange, July 2011.

In 2005, Wangusa was a Representative of Women Writers to the PEN Uganda Chapter.

In September–October 2003, Wangusa participated in the Cheltenham Literature Festival in the UK as part of the Across Continents Project. Also in 2003, she served as a judge for the prestigious Commonwealth Writers' Prize (African Region), sponsored by the Commonwealth Foundation along with Prof. Mary Kolawole of Nigeria and Prof. Andries Oliphant of South Africa.

During August–October 1998, Wangusa participated in the prestigious International Writers Program, University of Iowa, and was awarded an Honorary Fellowship in Writing by the University of Iowa.

In March 2002, Wangusa served as a Judge for a national essay competition organised by the American Centre (Uganda) to commemorate African American History month. In June 2002, she served as deputy Chief Rapporteur for the 8th International Inter-disciplinary Congress on Women in Kampala, Uganda.

Wangusa has also served on the steering committee of Women Writing Africa, Eastern Africa project of the Feminist Press (New York, USA).

== Education ==
- Bachelor of Arts (Hons) - Literature And Sociology, Makerere University, 1990–93.
- Master of Arts in Literature, Makerere University 1994–97.
- Master of Arts in New Media, Governance and Democracy, University of Leicester, UK, 2009–11.

== Bibliography ==
- Memoirs of a Mother. Kampala, Uganda: Femrite Publications Limited, 1998. ISBN 978-9970901012
- As editor, with Violet Barungi, Tears of Hope: A Collection of Short Stories by Ugandan Rural Women, Kampala, Uganda: Femrite Publications Limited, 2002. ISBN 978-9970700028
