= Hilda Twongyeirwe =

Ugandan writer and editor

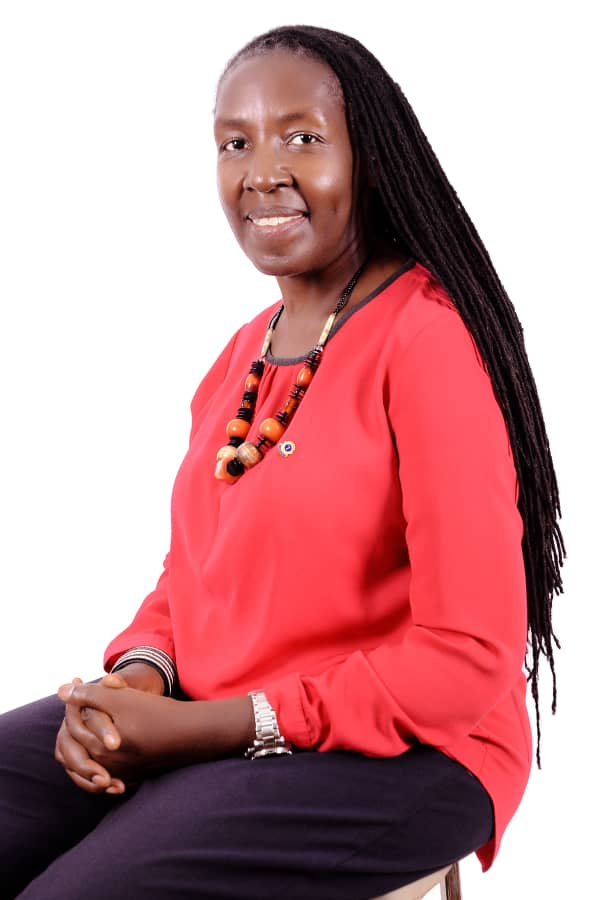
- Hilda Twongyeirwe
- Born: Hilda J Twongyeirwe; Kabale, Uganda
- Education: Makerere University
- Occupations: Editor, writer
- Writing career
- Genres: Fiction, poetry
- Notable work: Fina the Dancer (2007)

Hilda Twongyeirwe is a Ugandan writer and editor. For ten years, she taught English language and literature in secondary school, before she retired to do development work in 2003. She is an editor, a published author of short stories and poetry, and a recipient of a National Medal of the government of Uganda in recognition of her contribution to women's Empowerment through Literary arts (2018). She is also a recipient of a Certificate of Recognition (2008) from the National Book Trust of Uganda for her children's book, Fina the Dancer. She is currently the coordinator of FEMRITE, an organization she participated in founding in 1995. She has edited fiction and creative nonfiction works, the most recent one being, No Time to Mourn (2020) by South Sudanese women. She has also edited others including; I Dare to Say: African Women Share Their Stories of Hope and Survival (2012) and Taboo? Voices of Women on Female Genital Mutilation (2013).

== Early life and education ==
Twongyeirwe was born in Kabale district, south-west Uganda, in Kacerere near Lake Bunyonyi. She graduated with an honours degree in social sciences and a master's degree in public administration and management from Makerere University.

== Femrite ==
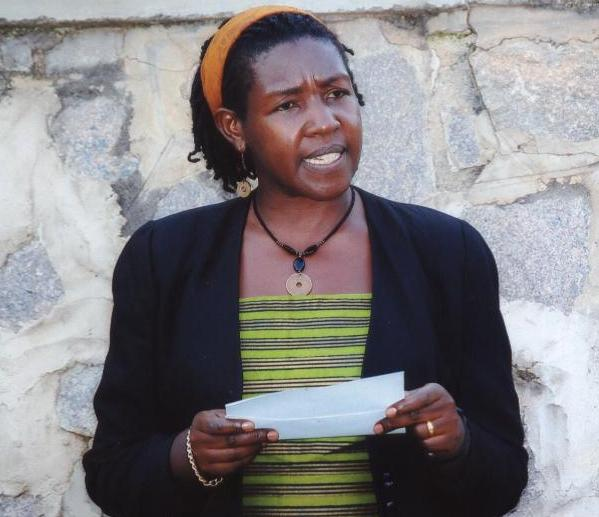
Twongyeirwe at a Public Reading at the Femrite regional residence for African women writers

She has been a member of FEMRITE since its inception, joining while still a student at Makerere University. She is currently the coordinator of FEMRITE. She has edited fiction and creative nonfiction works, the most recent ones being I Dare to Say: African Women Share Their Stories of Hope and Survival (2012) and Taboo? Voices of Women on Female Genital Mutilation (2013). She has taken part in a number of projects by FEMRITE over the years, to promote reading and writing, especially in secondary and primary schools.

== Writing career ==
Hilda has published a children's book, Fina the Dancer (2007), which was awarded a certificate of recognition as an outstanding piece of literature for children, and other books in Runyankole Rukiga for primary one and two. Her poetry has appeared in various journals and magazines, including "The Threshold by the Nile", in the Poster Poetry Project anthology. She has published a number of stories with FEMRITE: "Becoming a Woman" in 1998, "Headlines" in 2001, "The Pumpkin Seed" in Pumpkin Seeds, and many others.

She was a mentor in the 2013 Writivism workshop. Her story "Baking the National Cake" was published in October 2013 as part of the Words Without Borders project of work by women writing in indigenous African languages. She is a contributor to the 2019 anthology New Daughters of Africa, edited by Margaret Busby.

== Published works ==
=== Novels ===
- Fina, the Dancer. Sasa Sema Publications. 2007. ISBN 9789970039609.

=== Short stories ===
- "Let It Be an Angel", in Hilda Twongyeirwe; Ellen Banda-Aaku, eds. (2012). Summoning the Rains. Femrite Publications. ISBN 9789970700257.
- "And If", in Hilda Twongyeirwe, ed. (2012). World of Our Own and other stories. Femrite Publications. ISBN 9789970700257.
- "The Intrigue", in Hilda Twongyeirwe, ed. (2012). I Dare Say: African Women Share Their Stories of Hope and Survival. Lawrence Hill Books/Chicago. ISBN 978-1-56976-842-6.
- "Till we find our voices", in Hilda Twongyeirwe; Aaron Mushengyezi, eds. (2011). Never Too Late. Femrite Publications. ISBN 9789970700233.
- "Headlines", in Peter Wasamba; Harriet Mugambi and Jane Bwoya, eds. (2010). Tales from my Motherland. The Jomo Kenyatta Foundation, Nairobi Kenya. ISBN 9789966228451.
- "This Time Tomorrow", in Violet Barungi; Hilda Twongyeirwe, eds. (2009). Farming Ashes: Tales of Agony and Resilience. Femrite Publications. ISBN 9789970700202.
- "The Intrigue", in Violet Barungi; Hilda Twongyeirwe, eds. (2009). Beyond the Dance: Voices of women on female genital mutilation. Femrite Publications. ISBN 9789970700196.
- "Making Ends Meet", in Violet Barungi, ed. (2009). Talking Tales. Femrite Publications. ISBN 9789970700219.
- "The Pumpkin Seed", in Helen Moffett; Violet Barungi, eds. (2009). Pumpkin Seeds and Other Gifts:Stories from the FEMRITE Regional Writers Residency, 2008. Femrite Publications. ISBN 9789970700226.
- "Headlines", in Violet Barungi, ed. (2001). Words from a Granary. Femrite Publications. ISBN 9789970700011.
- "Becoming a Woman", in Karooro Okurut, ed. (1998). A Woman's Voice. Femrite Publications. ISBN 9789970901036.
- "Baking the National Cake", wordswithoutborders.org, 2013

=== Poetry ===
- "In conversation", "New Tarmac", in Beverley Nambozo Nsengiyunva, ed. (2014). A Thousand Voices Rising: An anthology of contemporary African poetry. BN Poetry Foundation. ISBN 978-9970-9234-0-3.
- "Sometime, I hear your Voice Mama", in Anthonia C. Kalu; Juliana Makuchi Nfah-Abbenyi; Omofolabo Ajayi-Soyinka, eds. (2013). An Anthology of New Work by African Women Poets. Lynne Rienner Publications. ISBN 978-1-58826-868-6.
- "Mama's Garden of Beans, Papa's Hands, Who Litters?" in Okaka Dokatum; Rose Rwakasisi, eds. (2009). The Butterfly Dance: Words and Sounds of Colour. Femrite Publications. ISBN 978-9970-700-18-9.
- "By the Nile, Threshold", in Painted Voices: A collage of art and poetry, volume II. Femrite Publications. 2009. ISBN 978-9970-700-18-9.
- "In Conversation, Breaking Order", in Post-colonial text Volume 8, No. 1 (2013).

== Books edited ==
- Hilda Twongyeirwe, Elizabeth Ashamu, Elizabeth Ashamu Deng, eds. (2020). No Time to Mourn. ISBN 978-9970-480-17-3
- Hilda Twongyeirwe, ed. (2013). Taboo? Voices of Women on Female Genital Mutilation.
- Hilda Twongyeirwe, ed. (2012). I Dare Say. Lawrence Hill Books/Chicago. ISBN 978-1-56976-842-6.
- Hilda Twongyeirwe; Ellen Banda-Aaku, eds. (2012). Summoning the Rains. Femrite Publications. ISBN 9789970700257.
- Hilda Twongyeirwe, ed. (2012). Word of Our Own and other stories. Femrite Publications. ISBN 9789970700257.
- Hilda Twongyeirwe; Aaron Mushengyezi, eds. (2011). Never Too Late. Femrite Publications. ISBN 9789970700233.
- Violet Barungi; Hilda Twongyeirwe, eds. (2009). Beyond the Dance: Voices of women on female genital mutilation. Femrite Publications. ISBN 9789970700196.
- Violet Barungi; Hilda Twongyeirwe, eds. (2009). Farming Ashes: Tales of Agony and Resilience. Femrite Publications. ISBN 9789970700202.
