= Violet Barungi =

Ugandan writer and editor

- Born: Violet Barungi; 18 December 1943 (age 82); Ibanda District, Uganda
- Education: Makerere University
- Occupation: writer
- Writing career
- Genre: Fiction
- Notable work: Cassandra
- Website: www.violetbarungi.com

Violet Barungi (born 18 December 1943) is a Ugandan writer and editor. She has edited several publications published by FEMRITE. Her published books include the novel Cassandra. She has worked as a book Production Officer at the East African Literature Bureau (1972–77), senior Book Production Officer at Uganda Literature Bureau (1978–94) and an editor at FEMRITE (1997 to date).

== Early life and education ==
Violet Barungi was born in Mbarara District, now Ibanda District, Western Uganda. She was educated at Bweranyangi Girls' Senior Secondary School, Gayaza High School and Makerere University in Kampala, where she graduated with an honours degree in History. She is married and has six children.

== Writing ==
Violet Barungi started writing while she was still a student. Her first short story, "Kefa Kazana", was published in Origin East Africa, an anthology of short stories edited by Prof. David Cook and broadcast on the BBC in 1964. Barungi’s play Over My Dead Body won the British Council New Playwriting Award for Africa and The Middle East in 1997, and has been subsequently anthologized in African Women Playwrights, edited by Professor Kathy Perkins, an authority on African and African Diaspora theatre.

Her publications include The Shadow and the Substance (novel) published by Lake Publishers, Kenya, 1998, Cassandra (novel) published by FEMRITE Publications Limited, Uganda, 1999, short stories for children, which include Tit for Tat and other stories (1997), The Promise (2002), Our Cousins From Abroad (2003) and The Boy Who Became King (2004). Her play Over My Dead Body (unpublished) won the British Council International New Playwriting Award for Africa and the Middle East region, 1997. Her other plays include The Award-winner, a stage play written to commemorate women's creative works in the new millennium (unpublished) and an unpublished radio play, The Bleeding Heart.

Violet Barungi's works deal mainly with human relationships, gender issues and education of the girl child. Over My Dead Body was inspired by her deep concern for girls who are lured into early marriages to rich men before they finish their education. When things go wrong, and their marriages fail, they find themselves without anything to fall back on.

== Editing ==
Baungi is one of the founding members of FEMRITE. She was an editor for FEMRITE from 1997 until 2007, when she retired. She has on a number of occasions been co-editor for books published by FEMRITE, since her semi-retirement.

== Bibliography ==
=== Novels ===
- Cassandra. Femrite Publications. 1999. ISBN 9789970901043.
- The Shadow and the Substance. Lake Publishers and Enterprises. 1998.

=== Children's books ===
- Change of Heart. Oxford University Press. 2011. ISBN 978-019-5736-89-2.
- Hope Restored. Oxford University Press. 2008.
- Wanda Asks Questions. Macmillan Publishers, Uganda. 2009.
- A Lucky Escape. Macmillan Publishers, Uganda. 2009. ISBN 978-0-230-533-13-4.
- Jena Breaks a Promise. Macmillan Publishers, Uganda. 2009. ISBN 978-0-230-533-18-9.
- The Baby in the Forest. Uganda Children's Writers and Illustrators Association. 2009. OCLC 898421250.
- Our Cousins from Abroad (a modern short story for children). Uganda Children's Writers and Illustrators Association. 2003.
- The Boy who Became King. Uganda Children's Writers and Illustrators Association. 2003. with Rose Rwakasisi
- The promise. Uganda Children's Writers and Illustrators Association. 2002. with Rose Rwakasisi
- Tit for Tat. 1998.

=== Short stories ===
- "Impenetrable Barriers" in Butterfly Wings (an anthology of short stories, 2010). Critical, Cultural and Communication Press. 2010. ISBN 9789970700219.
- "Afraid of my love" in Violet Barungi, ed. (2009). Talking Tales. Femrite Publications. ISBN 9789970700219.
- "Jago Goes to School" in Children Read Everywhere, an anthology of short stories for children edited by Betten and Resch 2002 and published in Germany, 2003.
- "The Last One to Know ", in Karooro Okurut, ed. (1998). A Woman's Voice. Femrite Publications. ISBN 9789970901036.

=== Plays ===
- "Over My Dead Body" in Kathy A. Perkins, ed. (2008). African Women Playwrights. University of Illinois Press. ISBN 978-0252075735.
- The Bleeding Heart (radio play)
- The Award-Winner, 2000

=== Edited works ===
- Helen Moffett and Violet Barungi, ed. (2009). Pumpkin Seeds And Other Gifts:Stories from the FEMRITE Regional Writers Residency, 2008. Femrite Publications. ISBN 9789970700226.
- Violet Barungi, ed. (2009). Talking Tales. Femrite Publications. ISBN 9789970700219.
- Violet Barungi and Hilda Twongyeirwe, ed. (2009). Beyond the Dance: Voices of women on female genital mutilation. Femrite Publications. ISBN 9789970700196.
- Violet Barungi and Hilda Twongyeirwe, ed. (2009). Farming Ashes: Tales of Agony and Resilience. Femrite Publications. ISBN 9789970700202.
- Violet Barungi and Susan Kiguli, ed. (2007). DARE TO SAY: 5 testimonies by Ugandan women living positively with HIV/AIDS. Femrite Publications. ISBN 978-9602088906.
- Violet Barungi, ed. (2006). Gifts of Harvest. Femrite Publications. ISBN 978-9970700042.
- Violet Barungi, ed. (2006). In Their Own Words: The First Ten Years of FEMRITE. Femrite Publications.
- Ayeta Anne Wangusa and Violet Barungi, ed. (2002). Tears of Hope: A Collection of Short Stories by Ugandan Rural Women. Femrite Publications. ISBN 978-9970700028.
- Violet Barungi, ed. (2001). Words from a granary. Femrite Publications. ISBN 9789970700011.
- Mary Karooro Okurut and Violet Barungi, ed. (1998). A Woman's Voice: An Anthology of Short Stories. Femrite Publications. ISBN 9789970901036.

== Awards and recognition ==
- Won the British Council New Playwriting Award for Africa and The Middle East in 1997 for "Over My Dead Body".
