= Anny =

Anny is a feminine given name. Notable people with the name include:

- Anny Ahlers, German actress and singer
- Ani Borisova (also spelled "Anny Borisova"), Bulgarian murder victim
- Anny Katabaazi Bwengye, Ugandan academic
- Anny Cazenave, French space geodesist
- Anny Cortés (born 1990), Colombian judoka
- Anny Buchstab Coury, Ukrainian-Jewish petroleum geologist
- Anny Divya, Indian pilot
- Anny Duperey, French actress, photographer, and author
- Anny Felbermayer, Austrian soprano
- Anny Fligg, German dancer
- Anny Helm, Austrian soprano
- Anny Rosenberg Katan, Austrian-born child psychologist
- Anny Konetzni, Austrian soprano
- Anny Miletty, Austrian silent film actress
- Anny Modi, Congolese feminist
- Anny Ogrezeanu, German singer
- Anny Ondra, Czech film actress
- Anne Thackeray Ritchie (also known as "Anny"), English writer
- Anny Robert, Nigerian portrait photographer
- Anny Rüegg (1912–2011), Swiss alpine skier
- Anny Schilder, Dutch pop singer
- Anny Schlemm (1929–2026), German singer
- Anny van Doorne (1930–2004), Dutch equestrian
- Anny von Stosch, German soprano
- Anny Vu, American diplomat

== See also ==
- Annie (given name)
- Anne (name)
- Anny-Chantal Levasseur-Regourd, French astronomer
- Anny-Charlotte Verney (born 1943), French racing and rally driver
