= Celestino Obua =

Ugandan physician, pharmacologist, academic and academic administrator

Professor of Pharmacology Celestino Obua

Chairperson of Uganda National Examinations Board
- Incumbent
- Assumed office 25 October 2024
- Preceded by: Professor Mary Okwakol

Vice chancellor of Mbarara University
- In office 24 October 2014 – 24 October 2024
- Chancellor: Charles Mark Lwanga Olweny (2017–2024); Peter Mugyenyi (2014–2017)
- Preceded by: Frederick Kayanja
- Succeeded by: Pauline Byakika

Personal details
- Born: 1953 (age 72–73) Uganda
- Education: University of Dar es Salaam (Doctor of Medicine); Makerere University (MSc in Pharmacology); Karolinska University (PhD in Pharmacology)
- Occupation: Physician, pharmacologist, academic and academic administrator

Celestino Obua is a Ugandan physician, pharmacologist, academic and academic administrator. He is the current chairman of the Uganda National Examinations Board (UNEB). He is the former vice chancellor of Mbarara University of Science and Technology, and was succeeded by Pauline Byakika in October 2024. He served in that position from 24 October 2014 until 24 October 2024. Prior to that, he served as the deputy principal of Makerere University College of Health Sciences.

== Background ==
He was born in Uganda, circa 1953.

== Education ==
He holds the degree of Doctor of Medicine (MD), obtained from the University of Dar es Salaam. He also holds the degree of Master of Science in Pharmacology, obtained from Makerere University, the oldest and largest public university in Uganda. His joint Doctor of Philosophy (PhD), also in pharmacology, was obtained from Karolinska University, in collaboration with Makerere University, in January 2009.

== Work experience ==
Obua served as lecturer, senior lecturer and eventually as associate professor of pharmacology at Makerere University School of Biomedical Sciences, a component of Makerere University College of Health Sciences. He also served as the deputy principal of Makerere, under Principal Professor Nelson Ssewankambo. On 24 October 2014, Obua was installed as the vice chancellor of Mbarara University of Science and Technology, the second academic to serve in that position, after Frederick Kayanja, who served from 1989 until 2014.

== Academic authorship ==
As an academic, Obua has been involved in research which has been published in internationally recognized databases and journals. His publications include Medicinal plants used by traditional medicine practitioners for the treatment of HIV/AIDS and related conditions in Uganda. This article documented herbal medicines used in the treatment of HIV/AIDs and related infections. Household antimicrobial self-medication: a systematic review and meta-analysis of the burden, risk factors and outcomes in developing countries. This review was conducted to establish the burden, risk factors and effects of antimicrobial self-medication in Low and Middle Income Countries. Acute toxicity effects of the methanolic extract of Fagara zanthoxyloides (Lam.) root-bark. The article discussed the toxicity of Fagara zanthoxyloides medicinal plant that is used in treatment of malaria. Measuring adherence to antiretroviral treatment in resource-poor settings: The feasibility of collecting routine data for key indicators. The study evaluated the feasibility of collecting routine data to standardize adherence measurement using a draft set of indicators. Barriers and facilitators to the integration of mental health services into primary health care: a systematic review. This review synthesized evidence of barriers and facilitators to the integration of mental health services into PHC from existing literature. Enabling dynamic partnerships through joint degrees between low- and high-income countries for capacity development in global health research: experience from the Karolinska Institutet/Makerere University partnership. Peer counselors' role in supporting patients' adherence to ART in Ethiopia and Uganda. This study explored peer counselors' work and their role in supporting patients' adherence to antiretroviral treatment (ART) in resource-limited settings in Ethiopia and Uganda. Prevalence and correlates of Alzheimer's disease and related dementias in rural Uganda: cross-sectional, population-based study. This study aimed to estimate the prevalence and correlates of Alzheimer's disease and related dementias in rural Uganda. Patterns and predictors of self-Medication in Northern Uganda. This article assessed the prevalence and predictors of antimicrobial self-medication in post-conflict northern Uganda. Antimicrobial stewardship: Attitudes and practices of healthcare providers in selected health facilities in Uganda. This study determined healthcare providers' AMS attitudes, practices, and associated factors in selected health facilities in Uganda. Factors predicting home storage of medicines in Northern Uganda. This study explored the factors which predict availability and utilization of medicines in households of Northern Uganda. Sublingual misoprostol versus intramuscular oxytocin for prevention of postpartum hemorrhage in Uganda: A double-Blind randomized non-inferiority trial. The study established no significant differences in rate of severe PPH, need for blood transfusion, postpartum hemoglobin, change in hemoglobin, or use of additional uterotonics between study groups. Antibacterial activities of extracts from Ugandan medicinal plants used for oral care.The study investigated antibacterial activities of 16 commonly used medicinal plants on microorganisms associated with periodontal diseases (PD) and dental caries (DC). Barriers and facilitators to the integration of mental health services into primary healthcare. This qualitative study among Ugandan primary care providers using the COM-B framework explored the context specific barriers and facilitators affecting the primary care providers (PCPs) in Mbarara district, Uganda to provide a practical way of addressing the identified barriers in order to influence the PCPs action towards integration of mental healthcare services into PHC. Using antibiotics responsibly: are we there yet? This article established that we must form a global stewardship of antibiotics that can link access, innovation and conservation efforts across countries to ensure sustainable access to effective antibiotics for all who need them. Others include Essential oils from Ugandan aromatic medicinal plants: chemical composition and growth inhibitory effects on oral pathogens, Suicide and suicide attempts among patients attending Primary Health Care facilities in Uganda: A medical records Review, Community perceptions about dementia in southwestern Uganda, Voices on adherence to ART in Ethiopia and Uganda: a matter of choice or simply not an option? and Health system constraints in integrating mental health services into primary healthcare in rural Uganda: perspectives of primary care providers.

== Personal life ==
Obua is a married father of three children.

== See also ==
- List of university leaders in Uganda

== Succession table as vice chancellor of Mbarara University ==
Preceded by Frederick Kayanja; 1989–2014	Vice chancellor of Mbarara University; 2014 - 2024	Succeeded by Pauline Byakika; 2024–present
