= Lynnette Tumwine Kyokunda =

Ugandan pathologist

- Citizenship: Uganda
- Education: PhD in Pathology (Makerere University), Master of Medicine Pathology (Makerere University), Bachelor of Medicine and Bachelor of Surgery( Mbarara University of Science and Technology)
- Occupation: Pathologist
- Organization: Kabale University
- Known for: Advocating for Community Health Services
- Title: Assoc.Prof
- Honours: Fellowship of Pathology FC Path (ECSA) College of Pathologists of East, Central and Southern Africa (COPECSA).

Lynnette Tumwine Kyokunda is a Ugandan pathologist at Kabale University, diagnostic laboratory expert, researcher and mentor in the field of medical education, diagnostic and community health services.

== Education ==
LKyokunda holds a PhD in Pathology (Makerere University), Master of Medicine Pathology (Makerere University), Bachelor of Medicine and Bachelor of Surgery (Mbarara University of Science and Technology). She is also in Fellowship of Pathology FC Path (ECSA) and the College of Pathologists of East, Central and Southern Africa (COPECSA).

== Career ==
Kyokunda works under the Department of Pathology at Kabale University School Of Medicine the same department she has served as its head in different Universities and tertiary Hospitals in Uganda, Rwanda and Botswana. At the University of Botswana, she trained their first five Citizen Anatomical Pathologists and established the Master of Medicine in Clinical Pathology program. She has served as external examiner in Universities all over East and Southern Africa like Uganda, Rwanda, Kenya, Tanzania, Botswana and South Africa.

She was among the five candidates who contested on the position of Vice Chancellor of Mbarara University of Science and Technology in 2024 where Pauline Byakika emerged as a winner.

== Publications ==
- "Gene expression analysis uncovers similarity and differences among Burkitt lymphoma subtypes".
- "Awareness and Self-Perceived Risk of Cervical Cancer among Women Living in Namuwongo, an Informal Settlement in Kampala, Uganda"
- "Analysis of Cancer Research Projects in Sub-Saharan Africa: A Quantitative Perspective on Unmet Needs and Opportunities".
- "Osteoblastic Osteosarcoma Arising beneath an Osteochondroma in an 11-Year-Old Male with Multiple Hereditary Exostoses".

== See also ==
- Joy Kwesiga
- Anny Katabaazi Bwengye
- Pauline Byakika
