= Stosch =

Stosch is a German surname. Notable people with the surname include:

- Albrecht von Stosch (1818–1896), German general and admiral
- Anny von Stosch (1895–1994), German operatic soprano singer
- Leonora Speyer (née von Stosch), American poet and violinist
- Martin Stosch (born 1990), German singer
- Philipp von Stosch (1691–1757), Prussian antiquarian
- Walter Stosch (born 1936), American politician

== See also ==
- Stosch Island, island in the Patagonian Archipelago
- SMS Stosch, Bismarck-class corvette built for the German Imperial Navy in the late 1870s
