= Fligg =

Fligg can be a middle name or a surname. Notable people with the name include:

- Constance Fligg Elam, English metallurgist and crystallographer
- Anny Fligg, German dancer
