= David Livingstone Ongom =

Ugandan, former executive secretary of the Uganda National Examination Board

- Born: 1937; Lira
- Died: Friday, 15th March 2019
- Citizenship: Ugandan
- Education: Apala Sub-grade School, Ongur Primary School, Boroboro Junior Secondary School, Sir Samuel Baker school, Royal Technical College and Makerere University
- Employer: Uganda National Examination Board

David Livingstone Ongom was a Ugandan born in 1937 in Lira District. He was the former executive secretary of the Uganda National Examination Board (UNEB). He was appointed as the acting UNEB executive secretary in 1984 and was confirmed in the position in 1989. Ongom David died on Friday, 15 March 2019 at 82 years.

== Education background ==
David Livingstone Ongom went to several primary schools such as Apala Sub-grade School, Ongur Primary School and Boroboro Junior Secondary School in 1949, 1953 and 1955 respectively, in Lira and Gulu districts. In 1957, he joined the Sir Samuel Baker school in Gulu district for his ordinary level of education and excelled in science subjects. A day after independence in 1962, Ongom went to the Royal Technical College in Nairobi, where he studied Mathematics and Physics at Advanced level on a Ford Foundation Scholarship. He later joined the department of Geological Surveys at Entebbe. He was then admitted for a postgraduate Diploma in education at Makerere University and he completed it in 1968.

== Career ==
After finalizing with studies, Ongom returned to his home area in Lango as a teacher for physics at Lango College up to 1970. He later transferred to the National Teachers' College (NTC) in Kyambogo as a lecturer of physics. He later became the NTC's deputy director in January 1973. Livingstone Ongom was then appointed by the East African Examinations Council (EAEC) in1976 as the deputy secretary in charge of examinations and research until 1980 when current Uganda National Examinations Board was formed. David Livingstone Ongom was replaced by Mathew Bukenya after his retirement in 1996. Ongom and his family were exiled to Nairobi during Idi Amin's regime. He worked as a teacher at Pangani Girls school and only returned to his old job in Uganda in 1989 after the fall of Idi Amin.
