= Bugongi, Kabale, Uganda =

Neighborhood in Western Uganda

Bugongi
- Location in Uganda; Placement on map is approximate
- Coordinates: 01°14′44″S 29°59′17″E
- Country: Uganda
- Region: Western Uganda
- Sub-region: Kigezi sub-region
- District: Kabale District
- City: Kabale
- City Division: Kabale Northern Division

Government
  - Division Chairman: Isaac Mucunguzi Rushoga
- Elevation: 5,935 ft (1,809 m)

Population (2014 Census)
  - Total: 36,000

Bugongi is a neighborhood in the town of Kabale, the largest urban center and district headquarters of Kabale District in Uganda.

== Location ==
Bugongi is a neighborhood in the Northern Division of Kabale, Uganda, located about 2 kilometres (1 mi) north of the town’s central business district. Its geographical coordinates are 1°14′44″S 29°59′17″E (latitude −1.245556; longitude 29.988056). Lower Bugongi Ward is located at an average elevation of 1,809 metres (5,935 ft) above sea level.

== Population ==
In 2012, the Uganda Bureau of Statistics estimated the population of Bugongi at 25,000. The national population census and household survey of 2014, enumerated the neighborhood's population at 36,000.

== Overview ==
Bugongi is divided into Upper Bugongi Ward, whose Local Council 1 (LC1) chairperson is Eric Kalemera, and Lower Bugongi Ward, chaired by Joyce Ndibwami, at the LC1 administrative level.

In the past, circa 2005 and before, Bugongi had a bad reputation as a slum neighborhood, infiltrated by thieves, prostitutes, and marijuana smokers. However, since then, new improved residences have been built, the number of churches has increased and the new educational institutions in the neighborhood have attracted students and improved the neighborhood's reputation and standards of living. The neighborhood is connected to the national electricity grid and is serviced by the National Water and Sewerage Corporation.

== Healthcare ==
Bugongi is home to two medical facilities: (a) Kabale Regional Referral Hospital, the 280-bed teaching hospital of Kabale University School of Medicine and (b) Rugarama Hospital, the 150-bed community hospital administered by the Church of Uganda.

== Housing ==
Many students reside in the neighborhood, mostly in apartments attached to residential houses. Only recently, has the construction of student hostels started in Bugongi. Land for sale is available, with a 5,000 square feet (460 m^{2}) plot selling for between UShs25 million (US$6,800) and UShs50 million (US$13,600), depending on the location. A 10,000 square feet (930 m^{2}) lot sells for between UShs80 million (US$22,000) and Shs200 million (US$54,500).

- Note: On 8 August 2018, US$1.00 = USh3,675

== Education ==
Upper Bugongi is home to several educational institutions, including (a) the Kabale campus of Bishop Barham University College of Uganda Christian University (b) the campus of Kigezi High School and (c) the clinical campus of Kabale University School of Medicine.

== Roads ==
The min road through the neighborhood is Bugongi Road. Until 2018, most of the roads in the neighborhood were murram-surfaced. As of August 2018, the Kabale Town Council had started improvement of some of the roads to tarmac.

== Markets ==
In the 2010s, Bugongi Central Market was undergoing renovations and modernization, albeit with varying degrees of community resistance.

== Prominent people ==
Doctor Ruhakana Rugunda, the current Prime Minister of Uganda was born in Bugongi and he maintains an ancestral home in the neighborhood.

== See also ==
- Kabale University
- Kabale University School of Medicine
