= Mary Okwakol =

Ugandan university professor and zoologist

Professor of Zoology Mary Okwakol

Chairperson of Uganda National Examinations Board
- In office 2014–2023
- Preceded by: Fagil Mandy
- Succeeded by: Celestino Obua

Personal details
- Born: Mary Jossy Nakhanda Okwakol; 1951 (age 74–75) Iganga, Uganda
- Education: Makerere University (BSc in Zoology) (MSc in Zoology) (PhD in Zoology)

Mary Jossy Nakhanda Okwakol (born 1951) is a Ugandan university professor, academic administrator, zoologist and community leader. She is the former chairperson of the Uganda National Examinations Board.

Before that, from October 2006 until May 2017, she served as vice chancellor of Busitema University, one of the thirteen public universities in Uganda.

== Background and education ==
She was born in Namunyumya Village, Iganga District, Eastern Uganda, circa 1951. She attended Namunyumya Mixed Primary School, for her elementary schooling. Mary Okwakol attended Mount Saint Mary's College Namagunga for her high school education.

She holds the degree of Bachelor of Science (BSc) in Zoology, obtained in 1974, from Makerere University, the oldest university in East Africa. She also holds the degree of Master of Science (MSc), in Zoology, obtained in 1976, also from Makerere University. Her degree of Doctor of Philosophy (PhD) in Zoology was also obtained from Makerere University, in 1992.

== Career ==
After graduating from Makerere in 1974, Mary Okwakol was invited back to the Faculty of Science as an assistant lecturer. She immediately embarked on her Masters studies and graduated in 1976. She was appointed lecturer. In 1988, she became a senior lecturer. She enrolled in the PhD program at the University of Oxford in the United Kingdom, but was unable to continue due to family responsibilities in Uganda. She transferred to Makerere and graduated in 1992. She has since been awarded full professorship by Makerere University.How Prof Okwakol Built Busitema From Scratch To The Academic Giant It Is Today – mulengeranews.com. In 2019, Mary was appointed as the Executive Director of National Council of Higher Education, a position she holds as of 2026.

== Other responsibilities ==
Professor Okwakol is a member of the Forum for African Women Educationalists, a pan-African non-governmental organisation founded in 1992, that is active in 32 African countries. The forum aims to empower girls and women through gender-responsive education. Its members include human rights activists, gender specialists, researchers, education policy-makers, university vice-chancellors and ministers of education. The organisation maintains its headquarters in Nairobi, Kenya, and has regional offices in Dakar, Senegal. Professor Okwakol has published widely in professional journals and has written chapters in scientific books pertaining to her fields of specialization. In May 2014 she was appointed to serve as the chairperson of the Uganda National Examinations Board; she left the role in 2023.

== See also ==
- Busitema University
- Gulu University
- Ugandan Academics
- Eastern Region, Uganda
- Busoga sub-region
