= Daniel Nokrach Odongo =

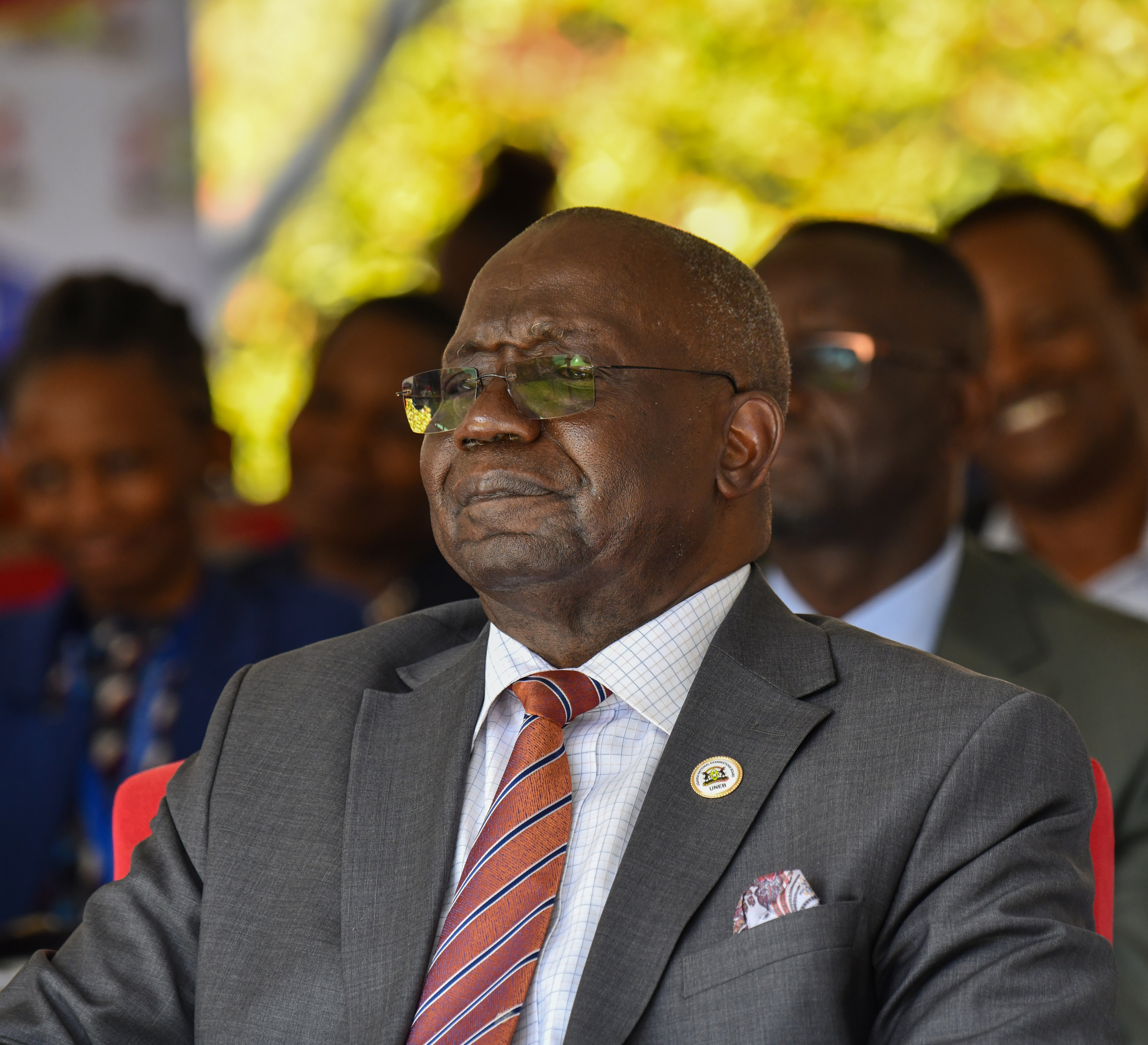
- Preceded by: Matthew Bukenya

Executive Director of the Uganda National Examinations Board
- Incumbent
- Assumed office 2016

Deputy Secretary, Secondary School Examinations
- In office 2004–2016

Headteacher, St Thomas More Secondary School, Minakulu
- In office 1985–1989

Teacher and Head of Agriculture Department, Kitgum High School
- In office 1975–1985

Personal details
- Born: 23/08/1951 Ofilu Village, Lalogi Parish, Omoro District, Uganda
- Citizenship: Ugandan
- Education: Makerere University
- Occupation: Educationist, education administrator
- Known for: Executive Director of the Uganda National Examinations Board

Daniel Nokrach Odongo is also known as Dan Nockrach Odongo (born 23rd August 1951) is a Ugandan agriclturalist, academic and academic administrator. He is currently an executive secretary(now executive director) of Uganda National Examination Board since 2026. He succeeded Mr. Bukenya Mathew(RIP).

== Early life and education ==
Odongo was born as the first boy to his mother on the 23rd August 1951 in Ofilu Village, Lalogi Parish, in present-day Omoro District, Uganda. His educational life started when he was only six years old from Parak Primary School in 1958, where he studied up to Primary Four, before transferring to Opit Primary School, which went up to Primary Six. He completed his Primary Leaving Examinations at Opit Primary School. He later attended St Thomas Moore Secondary School before joining St Joseph's College Layibi in Gulu in 1966 for his O-Level education, which he completed in 1969.

After completing his O-Level education in 1969, Odongo proceeded to Teso College Aloet in Soroti for his A-Level studies, where he studied Physics, Biology and Chemistry (PCB), with Subsidiary Mathematics. After completing his A-Level education, he joined Makerere University in 1972 to pursue a Bachelor's degree in Agriculture. He also enrolled for a concurrent Diploma in Education.

== Career ==
After completing his studies at Makerere University in 1975, Odongo began his career as a secondary school teacher. He first undertook his teaching practice at Mwiri College in Jinja before being appointed by the Teaching Service Commission to teach Agriculture and Biology. From there, he was transferred to Kitgum High School.

At Kitgum High School, he began as a classroom teacher and later rose to become head of the Agriculture department in 1979. In 1983, Odongo was promoted to deputy headteacher, where he was responsible for the A-Level boarding section. In addition, he served as an examiner with the East African Examinations Council from 1978 to 1982.

Odongo became an examiner in Agriculture becoming a chief examiner for O-Level Agriculture. In 1985, he was transferred to St Thomas More Secondary School, Minakulu, where he served as headteacher. In 1989, Odongo applied to join the Uganda National Examinations Board (UNEB) and he was appointed as the Assistant Secretary in charge of Biological Sciences.

In 1996, he was promoted to Senior Assistant Secretary before taking charge of the Secondary School Examinations Department, initially in an acting capacity. He was confirmed in the position in 2004. From 2004 to 2016, Odongo served as Deputy Secretary in charge of Secondary School Examinations at UNEB.

In 2016, Odongo was appointed Executive Secretary of the Uganda National Examinations Board (UNEB), succeeding Prof. Matthew Bukenya. He later became Executive Director following the change in the title of the head of the institution.

== See also ==
- Onesimus Asiimwe
- John Chrysestom Muyingo
- Elijah Mushemeza
- Emma Boona
