= Taibah College School =

Taibah College High School
- Entebbe Road near Kampala; Uganda

Information
- Denomination: Non-denominational
- Established: 2000
- Head Teacher: Oskar Semweya-Musoke
- Gender: Coeducational
- Education system: Ugandan
- Nickname: TCS
- Website: www.taibahschools.com/college

Taibah International School (TIS) is a mixed day and boarding secondary school located in Bwebajja 16 km (9.9 mi) from Kampala in Uganda, established in 2000 by Mariam Luyombo. At TIS they offer two curriclula; The Cambridge International curriculum (CIE) and The Ugandan National Curriculum (UNEB) for both primary and secondary schools.

== History ==
The Taibah International School was started in 1991 and on the very first day of the very first term. The school had an assembly of eight students and seven teachers at its very small campus. The school started with a handful of teachers and with one campus but now it operates three campuses which include Taibah International School Junior, located in Kawempe along Ttula Rd. It caters for students from Baby Class/Kindergarten year 1 and Year Six. The school offers day school options for children. They teach on both Cambridge and UNEB curricula.

Taibah International School primary, located in Bwebajja (Entebbe road) campus. At this campus there is kindergarten (early childhood education)/Nursery section to primary level from Primary 0ne to primary seven and year six. This campus offers both day and boarding. At this campus they offer both the Cambridge and the UNEB curriculum.

Taibah International School Secondary, its also located in Bwebajja (Entebbe Rd) campus. It provides world class education with both the Ugandan (UNEB) and the Cambridge International (CIE) curricula. It offers both O'Level and A' Level qualifications.

Since 2000 the school has been led by Oskar Semweya-Musoke as the Principal of the school, Annet Nannyonjyo has been Headteacher of Taibah International School at Bwebajja Campus since June 2008.

== Reputation ==
Taibah International School participated in the 2024 exposition which was under the theme "Protect the Environment". In the 2025 Uganda Inter-Schools Golf Championship, it was the first runner's up and was awarded a Silver medal.

== See also ==
- Education in Uganda
- Uganda Advanced Certificate of Education
- Uganda Certificate of Education
