= Isabella Epiu =

Ugandan anesthesiologist

- Born: 1986 (age 39–40); Uganda
- Citizenship: Uganda
- Education: Makerere University; University of California Global Health Institute; University of New South Wales
- Occupations: Anesthesiologist and academic
- Years active: 2009–present
- Title: Senior lecturer in Anesthesiology at Kabale University

Isabella Epiu is an anesthesiologist and critical care medicine specialist in Uganda. She is reported to be the first female anesthesiologist in the countries of the East African Community to graduate with a Doctor of Philosophy degree. In 2023, she graduated from the University of New South Wales in Sydney, Australia with a PhD in Medicine, specializing in neuro-respiratory physiology and health economics.

== Background and education ==
Epiu is an Ugandan national by birth, born in Jinja District circa 1985. Her father is Pastor Richard Honorat Epiu.

She excelled in primary and middle schools in her home district before transferring to Gayaza High School in Wakiso District. She was admitted on government scholarship into Makerere University School of Medicine, where she graduated with a Bachelor of Medicine and Bachelor of Surgery degree. She went on to obtain a Master of Medicine (MMed) degree in Anesthesiology from the same medical school.

She won a scholarship from the National Institutes of Health to undertake a one-year Fellowship at the University of California Global Health Institute, based in the city of San Francisco. Her doctoral program in medicine and health economics (PhD), was conducted at the Prince of Wales Hospital (Sydney), at the University of New South Wales in Sydney, Australia.

== Career ==
As of December 2023, Epiu's competencies include anesthesia, critical care medicine, emergency medicine, intensive care, and pain medicine. At that time, she was a senior lecturer in the Department of Anesthesia at the Kabale University School of Medicine, in the city of Kabale, in the Western Region of Uganda.

Epiu has been an advocate for equitable access to safe obstetric anesthesia and perinatal outcomes. Her original research in the countries of the East African community drew attention to wide service gaps in this area. Her more in-depth evaluation of 64 mid-level hospitals in Uganda, opened a wider exposure of the problems. She has written newspaper articles in East African print media, drawing attention to the dire need for improvement in these areas. As a result of her advocacy, the Society of Obstetric Anesthesia and Perinatology (SOAP), based in Lexington, Kentucky, recognized her with the 2016 SOAP Media Award.

== Other considerations ==
Since 2012, she has conducted research in maternal morbidity and mortality in the East African countries of Burundi, Kenya, Rwanda, Tanzania and Uganda. Later, she extended her research to 64 Ugandan hospitals. As a result of her research, she won several awards, including an NIH Fogarty Scholarship. She is the founder and director of Health Solutions International, a non-government organization. She is a Mandela Washington Fellow, part of the Young African Leaders Initiative program.

Epiu has multiple publications in the areas of her specialization.

In December 2023, the government of Uganda organized a special event at Kololo Independence Ground to celebrate Epiu's acquisition of a PhD. The chief guest at the event was the president of Uganda, Yoweri Museveni, who was represented by the vice president, Jessica Alupo.
