= Ephraim Biraaro =

Ugandan politician

Biraaro Ephraim Ganshanga
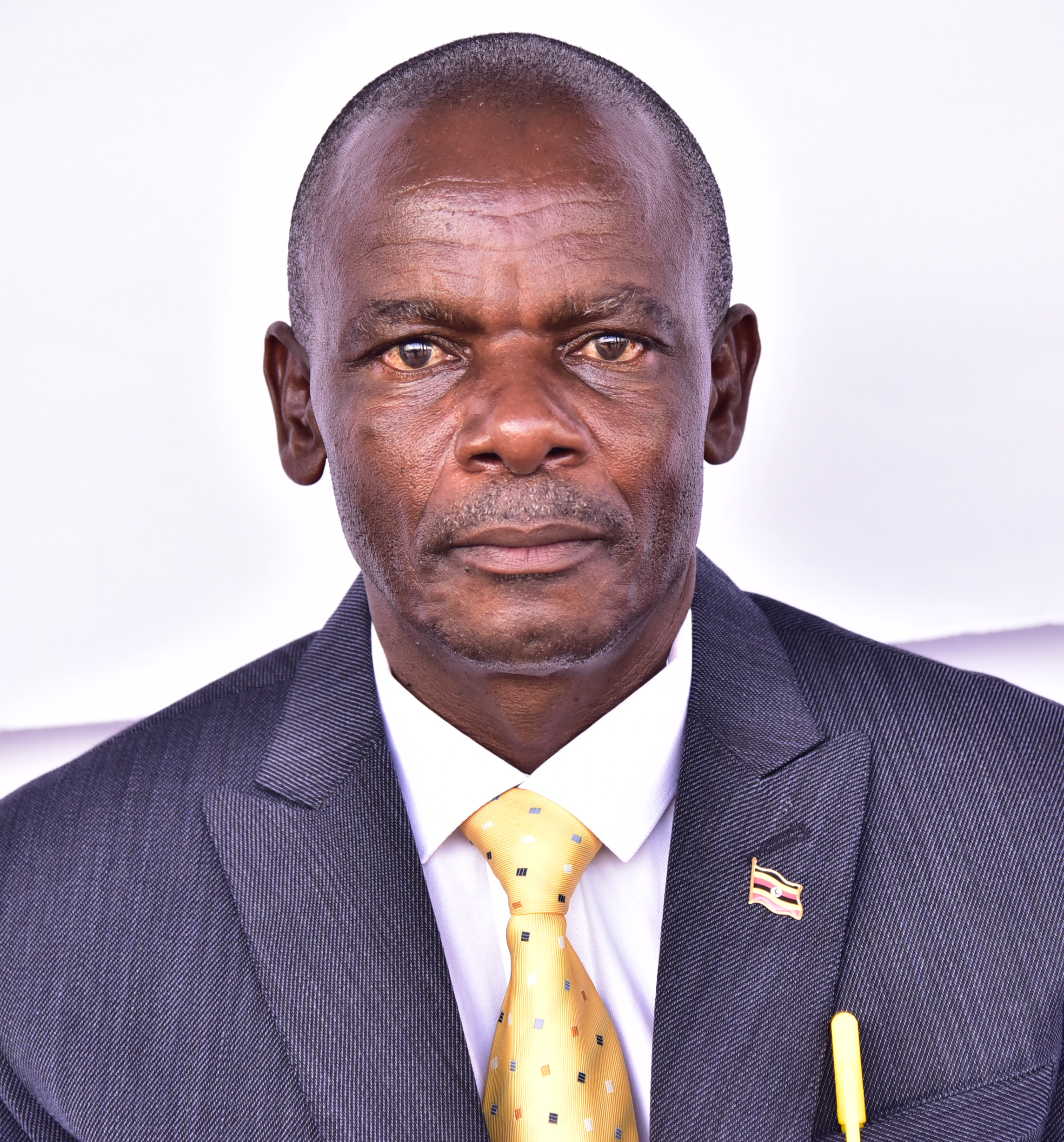

Honourable Parliament of Uganda
- Constituency: Buhweju West

Personal details
- Born: 28 January 1961 (age 65) Kikamba Nyakahita, Rubengye, Buhweju District
- Party: National Resistance Movement
- Parent(s): Asanansii Gashanga and Yayeri Gashanga
- Education: Uganda Martyrs University; (Bachelor of Business Studies)
- Occupation: Politician
- Known for: Member of Parliament

Ephraim Biraaro Gashanga (born 28 January 1961) is a Ugandan politician and legislator representing Buhweju West constituency, Buhweju District. In the 11th parliament, Biraro serves on the Committee on Equal Opportunities.

== Early life and education ==
Biraaro was born on 28 January 1961. He attended Church School at Nyakashaka in 1969 and sat his Primary Leaving Examinations at Nyakitoko primary School in 1979. He went to Burere SS in 1980 and in 1983 Nganwa High School where he sat his Uganda Certificate of Education In 1984, he joined Masaka Secondary School for Uganda Advanced Certificate of Education, but the school was disrupted by 1985 war. After National Resistance Army took over, he completed. He joined the Institute of Accountants and Commerce Kampala up to 1987.Between 1988 and 1991 he worked as a licensed teacher.

In 2004, he joined Uganda Martyrs University Nkozi for a bachelor's degree in business and in 2008, he got a master's degree in business administration. He is a member of the Anglican Church of Uganda.

== Political career ==
From 2002 to 2010, Biraaro served as Bushenyi district councillor for Burere. Between 2010 and 2011, he served as Buhweju district vice-chairperson.

In 2011, he joined Parliament representing Buhweju, and in 2016 he was won by Francis Mwijukye.

In 2015, he also proposed the curving of Buhweju West constituency from Buhweju County.

In 2020, he announced that he would contest the Buhweju West parliamentary seat before it was created, which he won later in 2021 general elections.

He was one of the demanders for Buhweju to become a district at a time he was a councillor in the district council.

He was manager of Igara, Kayonza and Mabare tea factories before joining active politics.

He is one of modal farmers in Buhweju district who deals in banana plantations, coffee farming and Tea.

He was one of members of Parliament who showed dissatisfaction with the way Umeme treated the citizens of the Republic of Uganda.

He lost MP seat after garnering 9,874 votes to NRM's John Bosco Kariisa who garnered 15,786 votes.

== Personal life ==
Ephraim Biraaro is the son to Asanasio Ganshanga who lives in Rubengye sub-county in Buhweju district.

== See Also ==
- Anita Among
- Thomas Tayebwa
- Dorothy Nyakato
