= Open Society Initiative for Southern Africa =

Open Society Initiative for Southern Africa (OSISA) is a Southern African organization which "collaborates with other organizations on issues surrounding the rule of law, democracy building, human rights, economic development, education, the media, and access to technology and information. The initiative's varied activities share a common goal of reducing poverty, HIV/AIDS, and political instability." OSISA's director for Zimbabwe is Godfrey Kanyenze, who also directs the Zimbabwe Congress of Trade Unions (ZCTU), which was the main force behind the founding of the Movement for Democratic Change, the principal indigenous organization promoting regime change in Zimbabwe.

OSISA is connected to the Open Society Institute (OSI) of the Soros Foundation.

== See also ==
- Open Society Initiative for West Africa
- Lucy Muyoyeta
- Anny Modi
