= Open Society Initiative for West Africa =

Organization established in 2000

The Open Society Initiative for West Africa (OSIWA) is an organization in West Africa. OSIWA was established in 2000 as a part of the global network of Soros Foundations. OSIWA claims to promote "open societies where democracy, good governance, the rule of law, basic freedoms and widespread civic participation prevail" and "the value of cooperation with similarly minded groups and governments". It is one of numerous Open Society Foundations founded by business magnate and billionaire George Soros around the globe.

OSIWA covers 18 countries, which include the 15 members of the Economic Community of West African States (ECOWAS), as well as Cameroon, Chad, and Mauritania. It also claims to support "civil society communities" and advocates to governments on issues of governance; law, justice and human rights; public health and development; information, communication technology, and media.

The current chair of the OSIWA board is El Hadj Sy from Senegal. Past chairpersons include Ellen Johnson Sirleaf, former President of Liberia and Abdul Tejan-Cole, Commissioner of the Anti-Corruption Commission in Sierra Leone, and Akwasi Aidoo, former Executive Director of TrustAfrica.

OSIWA has branches in ten countries, with offices in major cities such as Dakar (Regional office), Abuja (Country Office), and Freetown (Mano River Office).

== See also ==
- Open Society Initiative for Southern Africa
