= Francis Mwijukye =

Ugandan politician

Mwijukye Francis
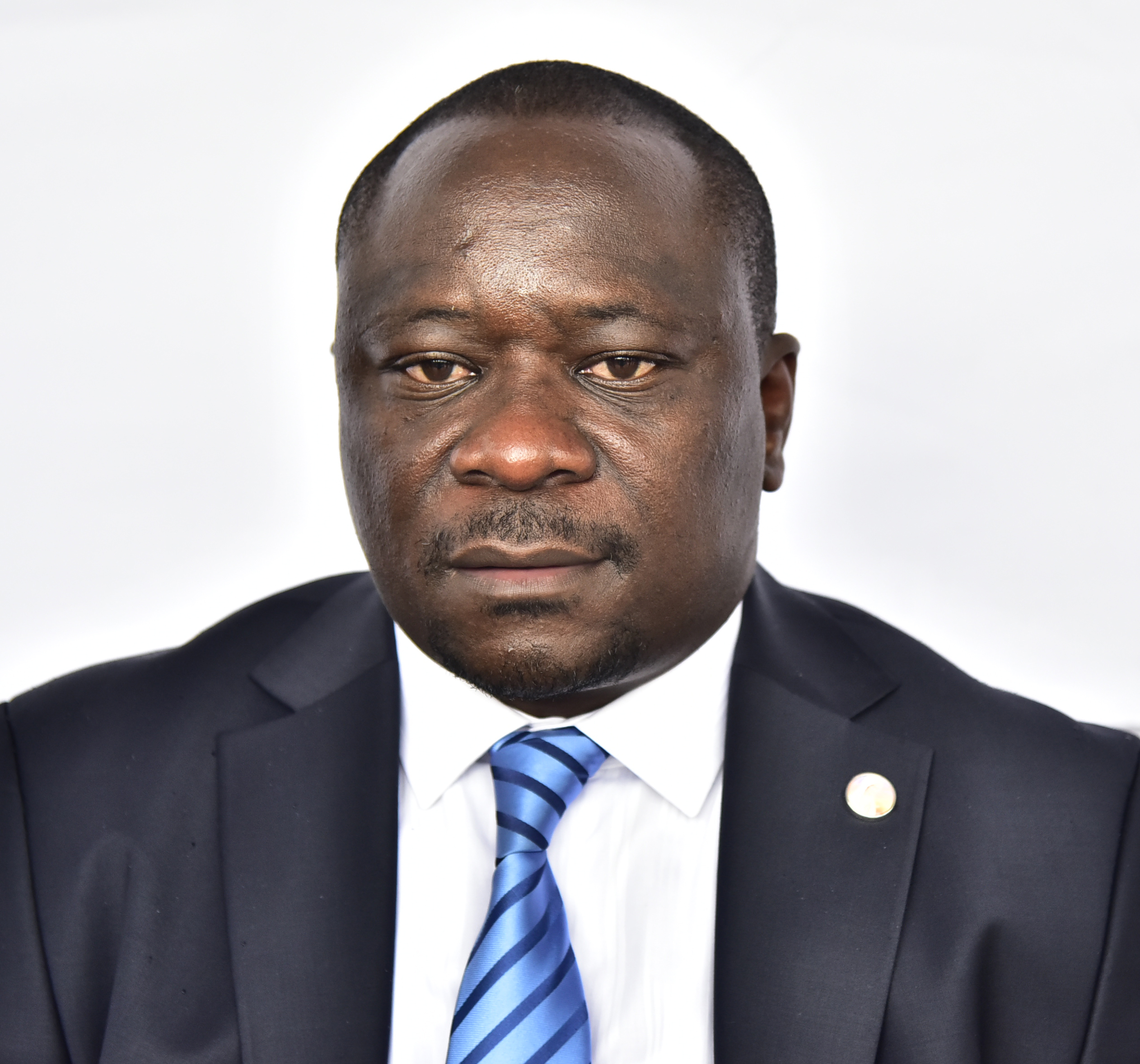

Commissioner of the 10th Parliament Parliament of Uganda
- Constituency: Buhweju

Personal details
- Born: 1983 (age 42–43) Bwoga, Buhweju
- Party: Forum for Democratic Change
- Spouse: Linus Mwijukye
- Parent: Tibingana.
- Education: Mbarara University; (Bachelor of Development Studies)
- Occupation: Politician
- Known for: Member of Parliament

Mwijukye Francis is a Ugandan politician and former legislator representing Buhweju County, in the eleventh Parliament of Uganda.

== Politics ==
He was a prominent member of the Forum for Democratic Change (FDC) and ran three times prior to winning his first term in 2017. He was chosen to serve as the FDC's parliamentary commissioner in 2019.

== Early life and education ==
Mwijukye went to Bwoga primary school, St. Mukasa seminary primary School, to St Joseph vocational School for both Uganda Certificate of Education and Uganda Advanced Certificate of Education and later joined Mbarara University, MUST, where he did Development Studies.

== Political career ==
Mwijukye has been a strong FDC member and had contested for three times before his first term in 2017. In 2019, he was elected the parliamentary commissioner representing the FDC. He also told a line of ministers in charge of security to resign due to the mass killing of twenty-one women in Wakiso district, by assailants.

In 2016, he joined Parliament after beating the then incumbent Ephraim Biraaro.

In 2021, he opposed the promise by President Yoweri Museveni to pay biology teachers 4 million shillings and history teachers 700,000 shillings.

He also survived poison in his food at a time he was campaigning in his constituency during the 2021 general elections.

He recently survived a fatal accident, though he had also survived poison he ate within his food, during his 2020 election campaign.

He is currently a shadow cabinet Minister for trade and industry.

He lost his MP seat to Eng. Zadock Mutekanga.

== See also ==
- List of Members of the Eleventh Parliament of Uganda
- Kizza Besigye
- Ibrahim Ssemujju Nganda
