= Frederick Kayanja =

Ugandan veterinarian and academic (b. 1938)

- Born: 4 August 1938 (age 88); Mbarara, Uganda
- Education: University of London (B.S.) (M.S.) (BVM); University of Nairobi (Ph.D.); Harvard University (Postdoctoral Research Fellowship)
- Occupations: Academic; academic administrator
- Years active: 1938—present
- Known for: Academics
- Title: Chancellor; Gulu University; Former vice chancellor Mbarara University of Science and Technology
- Children: 4

Frederick Ian Bantubano Kayanja (born 4 August, 1938) is a Ugandan veterinarian, academic, and academic administrator. He has been the chancellor of Gulu University, a public institution of higher education, since October 2014, replacing Martin Aliker. He is a former vice chancellor of the Mbarara University of Science and Technology. He assumed that position in 1989 and stepped down in October 2014. Before that, he served as the deputy vice chancellor of Makerere University, the oldest and largest public university in Uganda.

== Background and education ==
Kayanja holds a Bachelor of Science degree, awarded by the University of London in 1963. His Master of Science degree, obtained in 1965, and his degree of Bachelor of Veterinary Medicine, obtained in 1967, were both awarded by the same university. In 1969, he went onto obtain a Doctor of Philosophy, from the University of East Africa, Kenya, the precursor to the University of Nairobi.

== Work history ==
In the 1960s, Kayanja worked as an Assistant Lecturer at the University of London, from 1965 until 1966. He then served as a lecturer at the same university from 1966 until 1968. He then worked as lecturer at the University of Nairobi, in Kenya, from 1968 until 1970, when he was promoted to Senior Lecturer, serving in that capacity from 1970 until 1972. In 1972, he was promoted to Associate Professor and served there until 1973.

In 1974 Kayanja was hired by Makerere University as a Professor, serving in that capacity until 1982. He also served as Fellow and Visiting Professor at Wolfson College of the University Cambridge in the United Kingdom from 1982 until 1984.

Kayanja has also worked in a number of institutions both inside and outside of Uganda; including: (a) Lecturer at the University of London in the United Kingdom (b) Associate professor at the University of Nairobi (c) Professor and dean at Makerere University (d) Chairman of the Uganda National Agricultural Research Organization (e) Chairman of the Uganda National Council for Higher Education.

== Other responsibilities ==
He is the editor in chief of the African Journal of Ecology. He also is a fellow of both the African Academy of Sciences and the Uganda National Academy of Sciences. He is a survivor of Ebola hemorrhagic fever.

== See also ==
- Makerere University College of Health Sciences
- List of universities in Uganda
- List of medical schools in Uganda
- List of university leaders in Uganda
- Uganda National Council for Higher Education
