= Mariam Luyombo =

Ugandan educational entrepreneur

- Born: Dorothy Nanziri
- Education: Masters in Education
- Alma mater: Makerere University
- Occupation: Educational entrepeneur
- Known for: Taibah International Schools
- Awards: Uganda's Golden Jubilee Medal

Mariam Luyombo is a Ugandan educational entrepreneur. She is the founder and director of Taibah International Schools in Uganda.

== Education ==
Mariam Luyombo attended Mount Saint Mary's College Namagunga for secondary education. She earned a Bachelor's degree in Education in 1985, and a Master's degree in Education in 1997, both from Makerere University.

She was a Fellow of the Africa Leadership Initiative, a program of the Aspen Institute to train emerging African leaders, in 2002.

== Career ==
She taught secondary school at Makerere College School from 1987 to 1988 and at St. Joseph's Secondary School, Nsambya, from 1988 to 1990.

She founded Taiba High School in 1991, Silver Spoon Daycare Center in 1996, Taibah Junior School in 1998, and Taibah College School in 2000, all in Kampala, Uganda. According to CEO East Africa, her schools are known for "revolting against traditional rote learning that puts emphasis on just passing national exams."

She was the executive director of the Uganda Women Entrepreneurs Association Limited, an organization supporting female entrepreneurs. She acted as a moderator for the Africa Leadership Initiative in 2013 and for the Resnick Aspen Action Forum in 2017.

After moving to Toronto, Canada in 2006, she co-founded Chakula Tamu, an East African food store.

== Awards ==
She received the first National Enterprise Award for Young Women Entrepreneurs (1995), given by the Rotary Club and New Vision newspaper. Mount St. Mary's College Namagunga Old Girls' Association gave her their Award of Recognition of Achievement (1998), and the Uganda Investment Authority (UIA) awarded her a Certificate of Recognition for championing educational change in Uganda (2001).

In 2014 she received Uganda's Golden Jubilee Medal, awarded by President Yoweri Museveni. In 2015, she was among the recipients of The International Alliance for Women (TIAW) World of Difference Award.

== Personal life ==
Her birth name was Dorothy Nanziri. She is quoted as saying: "I had enjoyed a middle class family before but then my father became poor. I wanted to get out of that poverty. I didn’t want to be poor like my father".

She is married to Hajji Abbas Luyombo, who is involved in the Taibah Group of Companies. She has three children.

== See also ==
- Ugandan diaspora
