= Lucy Muyoyeta =

Zambian women's rights activist

Lucy Mutumba Muyoyeta
- Education: University of Zambia, University of Reading
- Occupations: women's rights activist, social development consultant and writer
- Employer(s): Oxfam, Open Society Initiative for Southern Africa, Women for Change, Non-Governmental Co-ordinating Committee (Zambia), Action Aid International and Comic Relief
- Notable work: Women, Gender and Development (2004)

Lucy Mutumba Muyoyeta is a Zambian women's rights activist, social development consultant and writer. She has worked at Zambian organisations including Women for Change, Opportunity Zambia and the Non-Governmental Co-ordinating Committee, and for international organisations including the Open Society Initiative for Southern Africa, Oxfam, Action Aid International and Comic Relief.

== Background ==
Muoyeta is a Zambian women's rights activist and social development consultant. She is polylingual and speaks Lozi, Tonga, Tumbuka and English. She holds a bachelor's degree in political science and government from the University of Zambia and a master's degree in rural sociology from the University of Reading in England.

== Education and Academic Training ==
Lucy Muyoyeta earned a Bachelor of Arts in Political Science and Government from the University of Zambia. She later completed a Master of Science in Rural Social Development at the University of Reading in the United Kingdom, with a focus on development-related and social issues. Available biography sources do not list any further formal academic qualifications or certifications.

== Career ==
From 1994 to 1998, Muoyeta worked as Oxfam's Zambian representative. During this employment she travelled to a meeting of the International Monetary Fund to deliver over 1,500 letters to Kenneth Clarke MP, then the British chancellor of the exchequer, and call for debt relief for African nations.

Muoyeta then worked as executive director at Open Society Initiative for Southern Africa from 1999 to 2004. She also served as the chair of Women for Change in Zambia and on the board of the Non-Governmental Coordinating Committee. She has also worked as Oasis Forum spokesperson and with the Women's Development Network.

After the 2003 invasion of Iraq, Muoyeta condemned the United States and Britain's unilateral decision to take military action against Iraq without a United Nations sanction in place. That year, she also criticised then President of Zambia Levy Mwanawasa's comments that women's attitudes hindered gender equality.

In 2006, Muoyeta criticised how the number of women in decision-making positions was very low in Zambia, as well as how both the United Nations Millennium Development Goals and Zambian gender and development declaration targets had not been met. She also spoke about the need for social sectors to be improved in Zambia, to support a sustained reduction in poverty alongside the country's economic growth and urged local journalists to fight the marginalisation of women.

From 2006 to 2010 Muoyeta was country director at Action Aid International. From 2012 to 2016, she held the position of project director at the Norwegian Disability Consortium/Opportunity Zambia.

Since 2022, Muoyeta has worked as a Project Lead at Comic Relief.

== Publications and Intellectual Contributions ==
Major Works on Gender and Development

Muyoyeta published the 28-page booklet Women, Gender and Development (2004, 80:20 Educating and Acting for a Better World), which outlined ideas and international agreements reached on women in global development. It also explained the challenges facing Zambian women in the traditional dual legal system, which varies from ethnic group to ethnic group but generally permits polygamous marriages and entrenches the view of women as minors in the law.

The work draws on Zambian data showing that women comprise 51% of the population but face disproportionate poverty (72.6% living on less than $1 per day in 2001), low formal employment (12% versus 88% for men), and heavy unpaid agricultural labor (70% on small-scale farms), alongside health disparities, high HIV/AIDS prevalence (58% of infections among women aged 15–49 in sub-Saharan Africa), low female university enrollment (20%), and gender-based violence.

In her 1999 contribution to Gender Works: Oxfam Experience in Policy and Practice, titled "The experience of Beijing from a Zambian perspective," Muyoyeta critiques structural adjustment programs for increasing women's unpaid labor through service cuts in Zambia, advocates for embedding gender considerations in economic planning, and recommends social safety nets, credit and land access for women, and NGO lobbying to promote systemic equity.

Themes and Empirical Focus

Muyoyeta's writings center on how structural inequalities exacerbate women's disadvantages in resource access, decision-making, and economic participation, moving beyond welfare-oriented interventions toward empowerment strategies that foster self-reliance and policy reforms.

A recurrent theme is her critique of customary and statutory laws in Zambia and Africa that perpetuate gender disparities—including barriers to land ownership, inheritance, and political representation—alongside the disproportionate burden of unpaid labor (70% of small-scale farm work in Zambia) and the gendered impacts of HIV/AIDS (58% of sub-Saharan infections among women aged 15–49).

Empirically, Muyoyeta grounds her arguments in quantitative indicators from UNDP reports, contrasting Zambia's Human Development Index (0.378 in 1995) with its Gender-related Development Index (0.372) and Gender Empowerment Measure (0.236), and uses regional SADC data to advocate for data-informed shifts from needs-based aid to rights-based approaches that alter structural power dynamics.
