= Anny Divya =

Indian pilot

- Born: Anny Divya; Pathankot, Punjab
- Education: Bsc in Aviation
- Occupation: Captain (aeronautics)

Anny Divya (born 1987) is an Indian pilot.

== Early life ==
Anny was born into a Telugu speaking family. Her father served in the Indian Army. The family lived near the army base camp in Pathankot in the Indian state of Punjab. After her father retired, their family settled down in Vijayawada, Andhra Pradesh, where Anny attended school.

== Career ==
After completing her schooling at age 17, she enrolled at Indira Gandhi Rashtriya Uran Akademi (IGRUA), the flying school in Uttar Pradesh. At 19 she completed her training and started her career with Air India. She travelled to Spain for training and flew a Boeing 737. At age 21 she was sent to London for further training, where she started flying the Boeing 777. She also holds an LLB degree from Rizvi Law College of University of Mumbai. Upon her upgrade to Boeing 777 captain in 2017, Divya became the youngest female 777 commander in the world at just 30 years old.
