= Irene Vera Young =

Australian dancer and dance educator

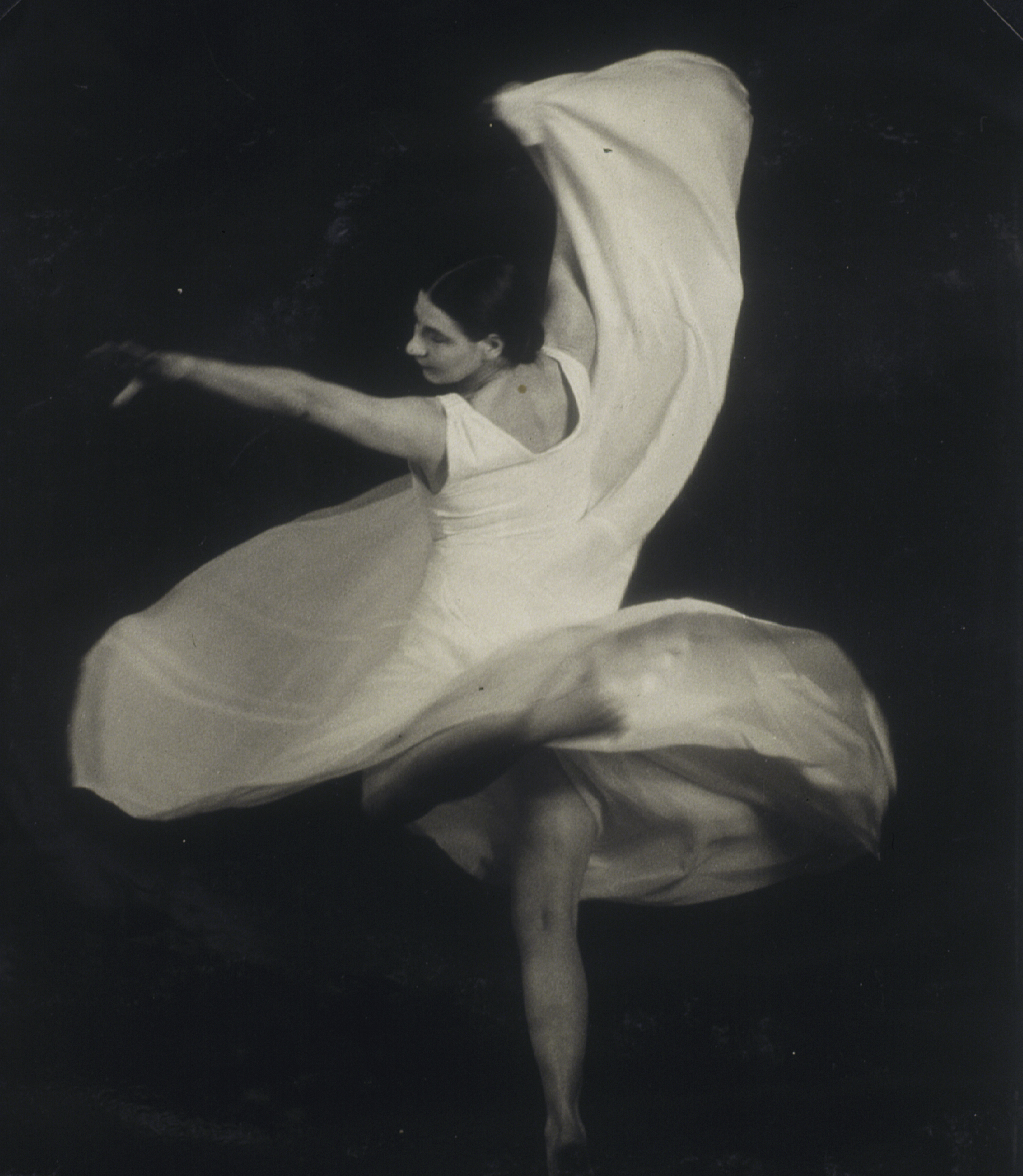
- Irene Vera Young, in the 1930s.
- Born: Irene Vera Carter; 1895; Bowral, New South Wales
- Died: 19 June 1975 (aged 79–80)
- Occupation: Dancer

Irene Vera Young (1895 – 19 June 1975), born Irene Vera Carter, was an Australian dancer and dance educator.

== Early life ==
Irene Vera Carter was born in Bowral, New South Wales, the daughter of Arthur Edward Hanslow Carter and Emily Pryor Barton Carter. She attended a convent school in Wagga Wagga. From 1926 to 1932, she lived in New York City, training in modern dance as a member of the Sara Mildred Strauss Dancers.

== Career ==
After she returned to Australia from New York in 1932, Young ran a dance and movement school in Sydney. She gave modern "German dance" performances and lectures as a solo artist, and with her Motion Choir. Her style of dancing was likened to (or sometimes contrasted with) that of Mary Wigman. "Dance, for Miss Young, is not primarily, or necessarily, a matter of the legs," explained a 1934 reviewer, adding that in one work, "all the dancers stood rooted to the spot with widely-spread green skirts to emphasize their stationary state."

In 1934, she danced the title role in Oscar Wilde's Salome, in a production created by Raoul Cardamatis, with original music by Ramsay Pennicuick. Young "proved herself to be not only a dancer of genius, which is already well known, but an actress of marked ability," commented the report in the Australian Women's Weekly. She danced in a Doris Fitton production of George Bernard Shaw's Candida in 1937.

Young toured in Japan in 1935. She won a gold medal for her dancing at the International Dance Competition, held in conjunction with the 1936 Summer Olympics in Berlin. In 1941, she and Austrian dancer Gertrud Bodenwieser organized the Australian Association of the Creative Dance. She later published a guide, A System of Body Culture for Young and Old.

== Personal life ==
Irene Vera Carter married solicitor Charles Throsby Young in 1914. Their daughter, Barbara, born in 1915, danced with her mother's Motion Choir in the 1930s. Irene Vera Young died in 1975, aged 80 years. Her papers are in the State Library of New South Wales.
