= Anny Buchstab Coury =

Ukrainian-born American petroleum geologist (1929–2026)

Anny Buchstab Coury (August 13, 1929 – October 7, 2026) was a Ukrainian-born American petroleum geologist.

== Early life and education ==
Due to the start of the Second World War, her parents left Ukraine to find safety in Lille, France, where Coury was born on August 13, 1929. As a Jew born in the 1930s, Coury had to endure many difficulties during her childhood, living in constant fear of the totalitarian dictatorship forming in Germany. Eventually, her family was forced to flee to Paris, France. Throughout her childhood, Coury and her family proceeded to live like nomads. They moved to several different cities within France and Spain, then finally settled down in Portugal for several years. When Coury was 11, her family left Europe to find refuge in the United States of America where she first got to New York, and then to Fort Worth, Texas. Coury would spend the majority of her life residing in the state of Texas.

Coury demonstrated admirable ambition and commitment to her studies, graduating from high school in Fort Worth, Texas at only 15 years old. Coury's father had a huge impact on her success, as she often took his advice when it came to her studies and her career. Her father advised her not to take typing in high school, as he believed she could amount to greater things. As a young Jewish female she had little chance of getting accepted into medical school. Despite her desire to study medicine, Coury took interest in geology and was enticed by the challenge of pursuing a career in a male dominated field of study. She received her undergraduate degree in geology at The University of Texas at Austin in 1949, at age 19.

== Early career ==
Coury found her first job at the Hoard Exploration Company, where her position required her to correlate geophysical records. Following this, Coury worked for a consultant, J. Brian Eby, although this specific occupation did not satisfy Coury's curiosity for the geological research she desired. Thus, due to her position that was mainly tasked with administration work, she moved on to find another job. Coury began to work at Western Natural Gas, which was a branch under the larger gas company El Paso Natural Gas. This marked a significant achievement in Coury's career, as employers during this time period highly prioritized hiring World War Two veterans over any other individuals.

== Building a family ==
In 1957, she married Glenn Coury and sequentially gave birth to her son in 1958, which caused her to have issues with work attendance. Seeing how her current lifestyle and job were incompatible, Coury came to the conclusion that it was time to move on to another position. She found a position in Union Texas where she was tasked to search for Sulfur.

In 1961, Coury gave birth to her daughter. Due to her growing family, Coury once again found her occupation and lifestyle to be incompatible, thus she began to try rock carving, also known as the art of petroglyph. Rock carvings are made by using a stone chisel, a hammerstone or other various instruments to chip off the surface of a rock in order to create a picture. By utilizing her rock carving skills, Coury was able to fund a 4-year trip to France with her family by selling her rock art pieces in 1967. She wanted to show the environment she grew up in to her family and hoped that they could also learn French.

Upon her arrival back in the United States of America in 1971, Coury received a job from the United States Geological Survey, where she then went on to work for 20 years, with a project leader position. In this position, Coury would lead a group of researchers on a project named "Offshore Mineral Potential of the U.S. and the World."

In 1974, Coury traveled to Denver to work for Shell Oil where she had to create a map that captured 600 basins all around the world. This project is known as the "Basins of the World". Through 1989–1994, Coury continued working on this project, where she was asked to become a chief editor of the American Association of Petroleum Geologists (AAPG) series with the same name as her project - Basins of the World. During this time, Coury continued to conduct research in the oil and gas field at the United States Geological Survey where she was promoted to the Assistant Chief geologist.

== Retirement and death ==
Coury retired in 1995. In 2017, she was honored for her lengthy career, and accomplishments at the 2017 Houston American Association of Petroleum Geologists conference. Coury died on October 7, 2026, at the age of 97.
