= Anny Fligg =

German dancer and dance educator

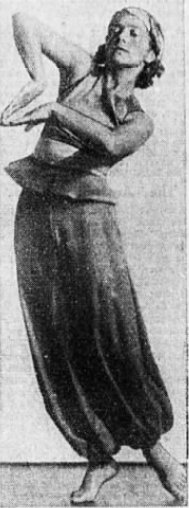
- Anny Fligg, from a 1937 Australian newspaper.
- Born: Anna Flig; 11 September 1862; Benern, Heilsberg, East Prussia
- Occupations: Dancer, dance educator
- Years active: 1920s and 1930s

Anna Fligg, known as Anny Fligg or Annie Fligg, was a German dancer and dance educator, who taught the methods of Rudolf von Laban in London and in Australia in the 1930s.

== Early life ==
Fligg was from East Prussia. She studied dance with choreographer Rudolf von Laban in Berlin.

== Career ==
Anny Fligg taught dancing as a public art and health project, to beachgoers in Swinemunde. She danced with the Berlin State Opera, and at Bayreuth. In 1928 she was one of the principal dancers in an experimental work by Hertha Feist, Die Berufung, with music by Edmund Meisel, and costumes by Thea Schleusner.

Fligg first danced in London in 1930. She opened the first school for Laban's methods in London, and was a teacher at the Royal Academy of Dramatic Art beginning in 1931. "Fräulein Fligg beat a drum and away we went," recalled actress Joan Littlewood, one of her students there. "Up! Down! Leap! Stretch! ... It was great. I'd never felt so alive." One of her other London students was Australian dancer Irene Vera Young.

At the invitation of Thea Stanley Hughes, Fligg danced and lectured in Australia in 1937 and 1938, with accompanist Kurt Herweg-Hirsch. She demonstrated the "ikosaeder" or "wooden crystal", a geometric device used in the Laban method for teaching about space. "My art has no relation to health at all," she explained, "but those who aim at physical perfection through exercise must gain inspiration from the natural beauty of flowing rhythm, which draw all anatomical muscles into play while dancing."
