= Kabale University School of Medicine =

- Type: Public
- Established: 2015
- Affiliations: Kabale University
- Students: 253 (2017)
- Undergraduates: 240 (2017)
- Postgraduates: 13 (2017)
- Location: Kabale, Uganda; 01°15′03″S 29°59′21″E
- Campus: Urban

The Kabale University School of Medicine (KABSOM), also known as the Kabale University Medical School, is the school of medicine of Kabale University, one of Uganda's public universities.

== Location ==
The School of Medicine of Kabale University is housed on the main university campus at Kikungiri Hill, in Kabale Municipality, in the block that formerly housed the Biology, Chemistry and Physics laboratories, until a more suitable location is found. The clinical departments of the medical school are located at Kabale Regional Referral Hospital, the teaching hospital of the medical school. The geographical coordinates of the clinical campus are:01°15'03.0"S, 29°59'21.0"E (Latitude:-1.250833; Longitude:29.989167).

== Overview ==
Kabale University Medical School was established in 2015, when the university became a public institution. This is one of the six public medical schools, and one of the eleven public and private healthcare institutions of higher learning in the country. Kabale Regional Referral Hospital is the designated teaching hospital of Kabale University Medical School. Approximately 110 undergraduates, 50 in medicine and 60 in nursing, join the university programs at the hospital every year. Their presence improves service delivery at the hospital and complements the hospital healthcare staff.

== Academic courses ==
A of August 2015, the following courses were on offer.

Undergraduate courses

- Diploma in Anesthesiology
- Diploma in Dentistry
- Bachelor of Medicine and Bachelor of Surgery
- Bachelor of Science in Nursing
- Bachelor of Environmental Health

Postgraduate courses

- Master of Medicine in Obstetrics & Gynaecology
- Master of Medicine in Pediatrics
- Master of Medicine in General Surgery (Since 2018)
- Master of Medicine in Internal Medicine (Since 2018)
- Master of Public Health

== Notable faculty ==
- Isabella Epiu, first female anesthesiologist in eastern Africa to graduate with a Doctor of Philosophy degree
- Lynnette Tumwine Kyokunda, pathologist

== See also ==
- Education in Uganda
- List of medical schools in Uganda
