= Anny Rosenberg Katan =

Austrian-American physician & psychoanalyst

Anny Katan-Rosenberg
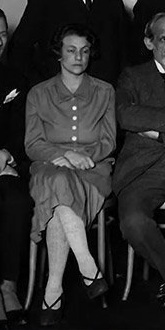
- Born: May 1, 1898; Vienna, Austria
- Died: December 24, 1992 (aged 94)
- Resting place: Cleveland, Ohio
- Occupation: Child Psychoanalyst

Anny Rosenberg Katan (May 1, 1898 – December 24, 1992) was a child psychologist born in Vienna, Austria, who pioneered the use of psychoanalysis to treat emotionally disturbed youth. She had close personal ties to the Sigmund Freud family and was one of the first child analysts in the city of Vienna.

== Background ==
Anny Rosenberg was the daughter of Judith and Ludwig Rosenberg. Her father Dr. Ludwig and her uncle, Oskar Rie were both pediatricians exposing Anny to child care at an early age. In addition, both her father and her uncle were card playing partners with Freud. Anny was also one of Anna Freud's earliest childhood friends. The Rosenberg family was friendly with the Freud family. Anny Rosenberg studied medicine of the University of Vienna from 1917 up to 1923. She received her diploma en 1923. She was trained as a psychoanalyst, with Max Eitingon in Berlin, Theodor Reik and Wilhelm Reich. She specialized in child analysis. and became a member of the Vienna Psychoanalytic Society in 1925, with a paper, Einige Beobachtungen an einem Kinde. She joined the Austrian Communist Party (KÖP) in 1934. She eventually married Maurits Katan, a Dutch neurologist, who went to Vienna to train as an analyst with Anna Freud. In 1936, she took refuge, with her husband and her son. She worked at the Institute of psychoanalyst in The Hague. When the WW2 occurred, she lived, with her daughter born in 1939, under a false identity, while her husband and son went hiding. Rosenberg Katan also worked to help others flee through Anti-Fascist movements.

After the war, Rosenberg Katan and her family settled in the United States, in Cleveland. Maurits Katan was born on November 25, 1897, in the Netherlands. His initial medical training started as a neurologist. Then he started analytic training in the Netherlands, but ended up moving to Vienna to work with Anna Freud. Here he met Anny Rosenberg whom he eventually married. After surviving World War II he moved to Cleveland, Ohio with his family. Here he became one of the first professors of psychoanalysis at the Case Western Reserve University School of Medicine.

== Legacy ==
Katan died in Cleveland, Ohio on December 24, 1992. Since she specialized in child analysis she opened up a preschool in 1950, now called the Hanna Perkins School. This school, as Robert Furman said, "It was a world that Anny Katan more or less created out of thin air for children like me." Katan also started a child therapy training program modeled on Anna Freud's Hampstead Child therapy course. She constantly applied child analysis practically, and held her research, and training, to the highest standards. Katan was also a founding member of the Detroit Psychoanalytic Society .

== Her work/achievements ==
Starting from 1929 Rosenberg Katan worked in the Socialist Society for Sexual Counseling and Sexual Research. Here she conducted consultations on sexual conflicts and neuroses and began to specialize in child analysis. When she was in Austria and the Netherlands Where she built and systemized child analysis. Katan went from being the Assistant Professor at the psychiatric hospital in 1946, to the Professor of Child Psychoanalysis at the University Children's Hospital in 1955. She was a member of the Detroit Psychoanalytic Society and was a founding member of the Cleveland Psychoanalytic Society, founded in 1957.. Rosenberg Katan was the Educational analyst and Chair of the Education Committee at the Psychoanalytic Institute in Cleveland. She held training courses for children's therapists, founded Hanna Perkins Nursery School in 1950, and was honored by the US President for working with behavioral, hard to educate, children. Rosenberg Katan also looked at causes of bed wetting, phallic injuries, and female puberty, as well as adults who were raped during their childhood.
