= Murder of Ani Borisova =

2015 murder of a Bulgarian child in Athens, Greece

- Location: Basement flat on Michail Voda Street, Athens, Greece
- Date: 8–9 April 2015
- Attack type: Child murder
- Deaths: 1
- Victim: Ani Borisova (aged four)
- Verdict: Guilty
- Convictions: Stanislav Bakardjiev: intentional homicide, desecration of a corpse and unlawful use of a weapon Nazif Ahmedov: aiding and abetting intentional homicide and desecration of a corpse
- Convicted: 2

The murder of Ani Borisova (Bulgarian: Ани Борисова, romanized: Ani Borisova; also rendered Anny Borisova) was the killing of a four-year-old Bulgarian girl in a basement flat in central Athens, Greece, during the night of 8–9 April 2015. The case began as a missing-person investigation after Ani's mother reported her missing on 24 April. The Hellenic Police concluded that the account initially given for the disappearance was fabricated and that Ani had died in the flat while in the care of her father, Stanislav Bakardjiev.

Bakardjiev admitted dismembering and disposing of Ani's remains, but consistently denied causing her death. Her remains were never recovered. In October 2016, the Athens Mixed Jury Court convicted Bakardjiev and his friend Nazif Ahmedov of intentional homicide and imposed life sentences. Ani's mother, Dimitrina Borisova, was convicted by a 4–3 majority of fatally endangering a child and sentenced to six years' imprisonment.

On 17 April 2019, the Athens Mixed Jury Court of Appeal upheld Bakardjiev's conviction and life sentence. It found Ahmedov guilty of aiding and abetting the homicide rather than committing it as a joint principal, reducing his sentence to nine years, and acquitted Borisova by a 6–1 majority. The absence of a body or autopsy made the precise cause of death impossible to establish and became a central evidentiary issue at both trials.

== Background ==
Ani was born in Sofia, Bulgaria, to Dimitrina Borisova and Stanislav Bakardjiev. Her parents had met in Athens in 2008. She spent most of her early childhood in Bulgaria with her maternal grandparents, while Bakardjiev remained in Athens; he had not formally acknowledged paternity. In early 2015, Borisova brought Ani to Greece, and the family lived in a small basement flat on Michail Voda Street near Agios Panteleimonas in central Athens.

Bakardjiev, who was born in Gabrovo, Bulgaria, in 1988 and had moved to Athens as a child, had a dependence on drugs at the time. A subsequent investigation by Kathimerini reported that at least five residents of the building had heard arguments, shouting or a child crying from the flat, or were aware of Bakardjiev's drug dependence. One resident described an argument between the parents on 9 March 2015 and said that police arrived about an hour later, although the Hellenic Police did not confirm that account.

== Disappearance report ==
Borisova travelled to Germany in the period before Ani's death, leaving the child in Bakardjiev's care. She returned to Greece on 21 April and reported Ani missing at the Omonia police station on 24 April.

In her first account, Borisova said that she had left Ani with a Bulgarian acquaintance called “Sylvia”, who had subsequently lost sight of the child at a playground. Investigators could not establish that the woman existed. Borisova later said that Ani had remained with her father. Bakardjiev also gave differing accounts, including claims that the child had left the flat while he was asleep. Police considered the inconsistencies, together with the evidence subsequently found in the flat, incompatible with a disappearance from a public place.

The authorities initially treated Ani as a missing child and circulated her photograph. On 4 May, after the investigation had shifted to the flat and the parents' accounts, police announced that the case was being treated as a homicide and sought arrest warrants for Bakardjiev and Borisova.

== Police investigation ==
Forensic examinations found blood matching Ani's genetic profile on bedding, household objects and surfaces in several parts of the flat. Investigators used a chemical reagent to reveal traces that were no longer visible after the premises had been cleaned. Blood linked to Bakardjiev was also found on a knife and a sheet. According to police statements reported by the Associated Press, Bakardjiev had bought cleaning supplies and new furniture, sold Ani's cot and pushchair, and made arrangements to replace pipes in the flat.

Bakardjiev said that he found Ani dead on the morning of 9 April and, fearing that he would be blamed, dismembered her body and disposed of the remains. He denied killing her and at different stages suggested that she might have died from illness or accidental exposure to drugs. Police said that the remains had been placed in refuse and discarded in bins around Athens over several days. Searches did not recover them; the regional police chief said that the method of disposal made subsequent identification and recovery effectively impossible.

Investigators also examined the role of Nazif Ahmedov, known as “Nikolai”, a friend of Bakardjiev who was alleged to have been present in the flat during the relevant period. The extent of Ahmedov's involvement later became one of the principal differences between the first-instance and appellate judgments.

== Criminal proceedings ==
=== First-instance trial ===
The trial began before the Athens Mixed Jury Court on 5 September 2016. Four defendants were tried: Bakardjiev; Ahmedov; Borisova; and another man connected with the flat, who faced a perjury charge. Bakardjiev and Ahmedov were charged with intentional homicide committed in a calm state of mind and desecration of a corpse. Borisova was charged with fatally endangering a child, and the fourth defendant with perjury.

At trial, Bakardjiev repeated his admission that he had dismembered and disposed of Ani's body, while denying that he had killed her. Ahmedov denied involvement in the homicide. Because the remains had not been found, no autopsy, histological examination or toxicological testing could be performed. The prosecution relied on the biological evidence from the flat, evidence of cleaning, the defendants' inconsistent statements and Bakardjiev's admissions about the disposal of the body.

On 11 October 2016, the court unanimously found Bakardjiev and Ahmedov guilty of intentional homicide and desecration of a corpse. Both were also convicted of unlawful use of a weapon. Bakardjiev was additionally convicted of incitement to perjury. Borisova was found guilty by a 4–3 majority of fatally endangering Ani, but was acquitted of perjury. The fourth defendant was convicted of perjury.

Bakardjiev received life imprisonment for the homicide, with additional terms of two years for desecration of a corpse, two years for unlawful use of a weapon and one year for incitement to perjury. Ahmedov received life imprisonment for the homicide and two additional two-year terms. Borisova was sentenced to six years' imprisonment; enforcement of her sentence was suspended pending appeal, subject to restrictions. The fourth defendant received a 12-month prison sentence.

=== Appeal ===
The Athens Mixed Jury Court of Appeal reheard the evidence in 2018 and 2019, including the competing forensic interpretations of the blood traces and the question of whether the available evidence could establish the circumstances of death without the body. Bakardjiev again acknowledged the dismemberment and disposal of the remains but denied causing Ani's death.

On 17 April 2019, the appellate court unanimously upheld Bakardjiev's conviction for intentional homicide, desecration of a corpse and unlawful use of a weapon. It imposed life imprisonment and an additional two-year term.

The court no longer treated Ahmedov as a joint principal in the homicide. It convicted him of aiding and abetting the homicide and of desecration of a corpse, recognised a mitigating circumstance based on his conduct after the offence, and imposed a total sentence of nine years. One member of the court would have acquitted him. Borisova was acquitted of fatally endangering a child by a 6–1 majority, reversing her six-year first-instance sentence.

Principal outcomes at first instance and on appeal
| Defendant | First-instance judgment (2016) | Appellate judgment (2019) |
|---|---|---|
| Stanislav Bakardjiev | Guilty of intentional homicide, desecration of a corpse, unlawful use of a weapon and incitement to perjury; life imprisonment and additional terms | Convictions for intentional homicide, desecration of a corpse and unlawful use of a weapon upheld; life imprisonment and an additional two years |
| Nazif Ahmedov | Guilty of intentional homicide as a joint principal, desecration of a corpse and unlawful use of a weapon; life imprisonment and additional terms | Guilty of aiding and abetting intentional homicide and desecration of a corpse; nine years' imprisonment |
| Dimitrina Borisova | Guilty by 4–3 of fatally endangering a child; six years' imprisonment, suspended pending appeal | Acquitted by 6–1 |

== Evidentiary issues ==
The non-recovery of Ani's remains prevented a conventional post-mortem examination and left the precise fatal injury, time of death and possible presence of toxic substances undetermined. The parties disputed what could be inferred from the quantity of blood and its distribution in the flat.

During the appeal, forensic pathologist Nikos Karakousis said that the blood patterns were consistent with the possibility that circulation had continued when at least some injuries were inflicted. A police laboratory specialist testified that reagent testing revealed dispersed blood after the flat had been cleaned, but said that the traces could not establish whether Ani had been alive at the relevant point. A defence-appointed forensic specialist, Dimitris Galenteris, said there was no evidence that she had been alive during the dismemberment and proposed accidental drug ingestion as a possible cause of death. The courts nevertheless found the prosecution case sufficient to establish intentional homicide, while the appellate court reduced Ahmedov's degree of participation.

== Public response and child-protection concerns ==
The case received extensive coverage in Greece and abroad. The Associated Press reported the end of the nationwide missing-child search and the police account of the investigation, while Bulgarian broadcaster bTV covered the killing of the Bulgarian child in Greece. Members of the public left flowers, candles and children's objects outside the basement flat after police announced Ani's death.

Reporting after the killing drew attention to possible signs of neglect and domestic conflict before Ani's death. Kathimerini documented neighbours' accounts of arguments and crying and the resident's unconfirmed account of police attending the building a month before the killing. The newspaper discussed the case with specialists in child custody and addiction services as an example of the difficulty of recognising and acting on multiple warning signs when parents or carers are affected by addiction.
