= Anny Modi =

Women's rights activist from the Democratic Republic of the Congo

Anny Tengandide Modi
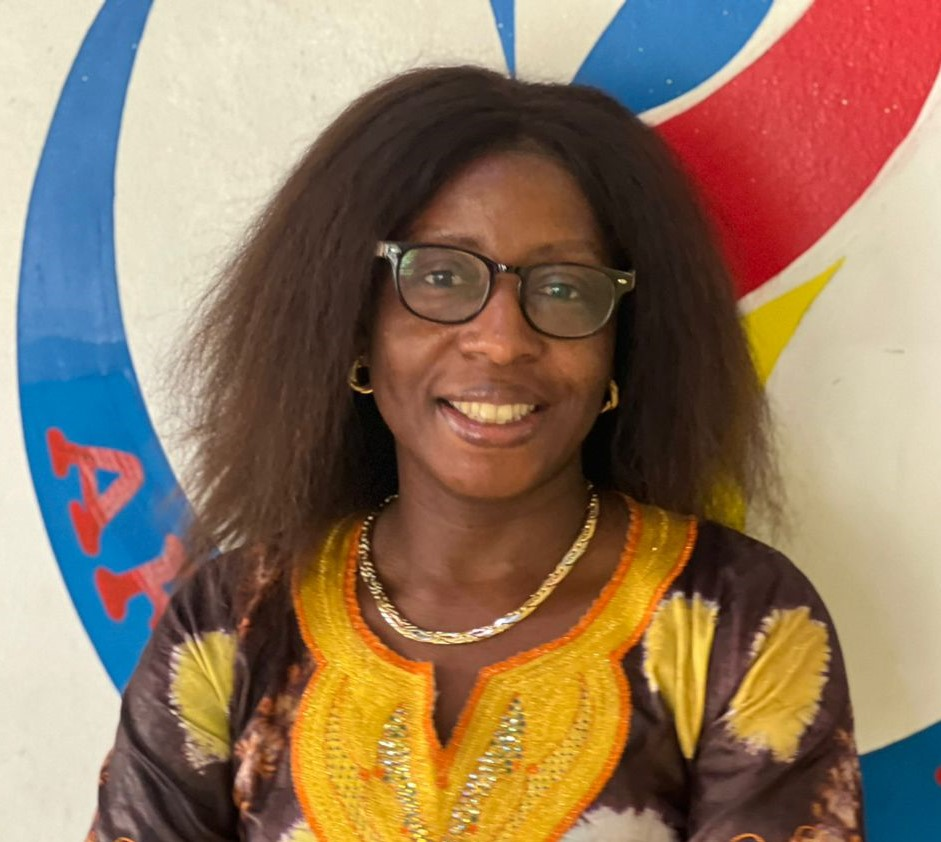
- Born: January 2, 1982 (age 44); Buta, Democratic Republic of the Congo
- Occupation: Executive Director of Afia Mama
- Years active: 2012–present
- Known for: Women's rights activist; advocate for victims of sexual violence
- Honours: Franco-German Prize for Human Rights and the Rule of Law (2023)

Anny Tengandide Modi (born 2 January 1982) is a Congolese feminist and women's rights activist.

== Early life ==
Modi was born in Buta in 1982. Her father, a Zaire politician who raised his children without gendered expectations, died when she was 13 years old. As his death made Modi an orphan, she relocated to live with relatives in Goma, two months before the August 1998 outbreak of the Second Congo War.

In Goma, Modi experienced discrimination from Congolese residents who mistakenly believed Modi was a Rwandan refugee, based on her physical appearance. The outbreak of the war also brought with it an increase in the rate of sexual violence, and Modi was also unable to access accurate information about her sexual health and rights. When she became pregnant aged 17, she felt her "life was over." After giving birth in 2000, two months after her 18th birthday, Modi decided she wanted to give her daughter a better standard of living than she had experienced.

She and her family fled from the war-afflicted eastern region of the Democratic Republic of the Congo (DRC) to Kinshasa in the west. Their journey was complicated, weaving through Rwanda, Bujumbura, Tanzania, and Zambia. Upon arriving in Kinshasa, Modi was detained and interrogated by security services, who suspected she was a spy due to her appearance. After she was released, she resumed her education for a time in Kinshasa, but continued to face racial discrimination. Fearing for her safety, Modi's uncle subsequently sent her to seek asylum in South Africa.

== Refuge in South Africa ==
Modi lived in South Africa for ten years. During this time, she encountered fellow Congolese refugees who were struggling to navigate life in South Africa due to language barriers and an absence of documentation. Modi, who was fluent in English, worked in refugee centres and volunteered for local non-governmental organisations to support these and other women.

This work fostered Modi's interest in women's rights advocacy, or becoming a "voice for the voiceless." She would not see herself as a leader until 2009, when she worked with the Open Society Initiative for Southern Africa to launch an awareness campaign against sexual violence. The initiative's impetus was the outbreak of additional armed conflict in the DRC, stoking Modi's concerns with the prevalence of sexual violence as a tool of war. She ultimately decided to return to the DRC in 2012.

== Advocacy in the DRC ==
=== Afia Mama ===
After returning to Kinshasa, Modi co-founded Afia Mama (“Women's Health”), a non-profit youth-led organisation that provides professional development opportunities for women and girls. In addition, the organisation advocates against sexual violence and offers support to victims, including legal support, and works to reduce the stigma associated with AIDS in the region. She remains its executive director as of 2025.

Ahead of the DRC's 2023 general election in December 2023, Afia Mama urged leaders to adopt a united message of opposition to political violence. When the elections were accompanied by reports of sexual and gender-based violence, Modi spoke to French television network TV5Monde, describing how women had been targeted along ideological and ethnic lines.

In September 2024, thousands of male prisoners escaped from Makala prison and raped hundreds of inmates in the women's section. In the aftermath, Modi, supported by a local Catholic chaplaincy, set up a women's shelter for victims of the event; she also tracked down some victims herself to offer them accommodation.

=== Other advocacy ===
Since founding Afia Mama, Modi has advised DRC politicians and organisations including MONUSCO on improving the status of women in the country. As of 2024, she is a Gender Advisor for Pathfinder International, advancing an integrated women's health program in the DRC with support from USAID.

=== International work ===
Modi became a manager and researcher of La Pépinière ("The Nursery") in 2015, a program supporting 15 female Congolese researchers to better understand the social and economic needs of women and girls in the country. This work was funded by the Department for International Development of the United Kingdom.

In July 2017, Modi was appointed as the Youth Advisor of the African Women Leaders Network, a joint initiative between UN Women, the African Union Commission, and the Permanent Mission of Germany. Modi contributed to a 2019 review by Girls not Brides, assessing the global prevalence of child marriage and action that could be taken to eliminate the practice.

Speaking at a conference in Lviv in November 2025, Modi called for an end to the Russian occupation of Ukraine. She described herself as "deeply moved by the price Ukrainians [had] paid... defending their land" until that point, and drew comparisons between reports of sexual violence in eastern DRC and reports from the occupied territories of Ukraine.

== Social views ==
=== Sexual violence in war ===
Modi is a vocal critic of the use of sexual violence as a weapon of war, describing the problem as "systematic" in the DRC. She has criticized patriarchal norms for reducing women and girls to representations of "the pride of the men they are with", sustaining an environment in which rape is a tool to humiliate the enemy during armed conflicts. Modi believes that the prevalence of sexual violence in the eastern regions of the DRC does not receive enough attention from international governments, and has urged the United Nations to conduct humanitarian interventions.

=== Women's participation in government and peacebuilding ===
Modi advocates for involving women in government, peace negotiations, and community-building, viewing this as essential to preventing additional violence. She believes that when women are "not sitting around the table, [they] will continue to be victims of decisions that [they] did not participate in." She is an advocate for democratic gender parity rules.

Highlighting the low number of female parliamentarians in the DRC in 2022, Modi opined that there will be no peace in the country "without women's rights." In 2023, following reports of sexual violence around the DRC's general election, she observed that "political leaders, not having been forced to integrate women [into governance], do not feel the obligation to protect them either."

== Recognition ==
In 2023, Modi was one of the recipients of the Franco-German Prize for Human Rights and the Rule of Law, in recognition of her ongoing advocacy efforts.
