= Anny Katabaazi Bwengye =

Ugandan academic administrator

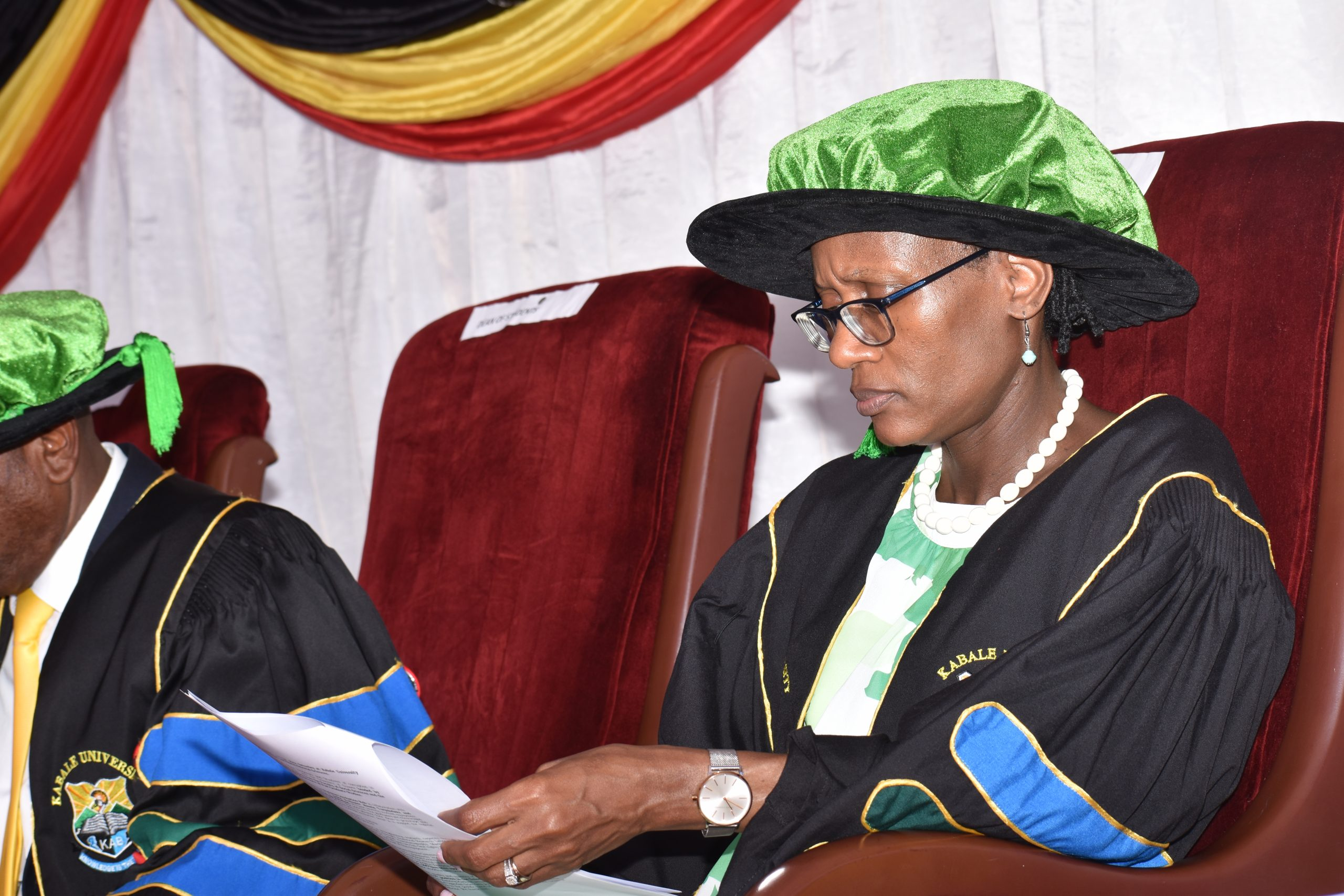
- Citizenship: Uganda
- Education: MSc in Management & Information Systems(Nottingham Trent University BA (Hons) Human Resource & Business Administration(Nottingham Trent University); Nottingham Trent University(MSc in Management & Information Systems) BA (Hons) Human Resource & Business Administration( Nottingham Trent University)
- Occupation: Academic administrator
- Organization: Kabale University

Anny Katabaazi Bwengye is a Ugandan academician who is the Deputy Vice Chancellor at Kabale University in charge of finance and administration. She was the Acting Deputy Vice Chancellor Finance and Administration at Uganda Christian University.

== Background and education ==
She has a MSc in Management & Information Systems from Nottingham Trent University and a BA (Hons) degree in Human Resources & Business Administration from the same University.

== Career ==
She is currently the Deputy Vice Chancellor at Kabale University in charge of Finance and Administration. She was the Head of Human Resource & Operations at Queensworth Investments SMC Limited until March 2020. She was the Acting Deputy Vice Chancellor Finance and Administration from May 2013 to 31 March 2014 and then Deputy Vice Chancellor from 1 April 2014 to 31 March 2018 at Uganda Christian University. She also served as the Director of Human Resource Management from 2009 to March 2013 at the same institution.

She was the Operations Director at Nottingham University from Feb 2004 to April 2009 and the Human Resource Manager, Nottingham University from 2000 to Jan 2004. From 1997 to 1999, She was the Human Resource Administrator at Nottingham Trent University.

== Articles and papers ==
- "Governance and poverty eradication policy performance during the NRM Administration in Uganda 1986 – 2020".
- "The effects of financial distress on financial performance: An empirical analysis of SMEs in Sheema, Buhweju, Rubirizi, and Bushenyi districts".
- "Board Assurance and Financial Performance of Selected Saccos in Kiruhura District, Uganda".
