= Anny von Stosch =

German soprano

Anny von Stosch (3 May 1895 – 31 December 1994) was a German operatic soprano

== Life ==
Born in Bremen, Stosch was a pupil of the singing teacher Jacques Stückgold in Berlin. After the end of World War I, Stosch had her first appearances as a concert singer and in 1924 she made her debut as an opera singer at the Stadttheater Königsberg.

She stayed there until 1927 and was then engaged at the Lübeck Stadttheater until summer 1928. Afterwards, she moved for four years to the municipal stages of Darmstadt. In 1932, she was engaged for one season at the opera house of Düsseldorf and in 1933 she went to the Opera house in Nuremberg for two years.

In 1935 Stosch moved to the Staatstheater in Kassel, where she was able to participate in the 1937 premiere of the opera Tobias Wunderlich by Joseph Haas. Between 1935 and 1944, Stosch appeared regularly at the Berliner Staatsoper. From 1936 to 1938, Stosch also sang at the Bayreuth Festival and thus became one of the most important Wagner interpreters of her time.

In 1950 Stosch said farewell to the stage in Kassel and then worked at the local conservatory for almost twenty years. She died in Kassel on 31 December 1994 at the age of 99.
