= Pauline Byakika =

Ugandan specialist physician

Professor of Medicine Pauline Byakika

Vice Chancellor of Mbarara University
- Incumbent
- Assumed office 25 October 2024
- Chancellor: Prof Jack Pen Mogi Nyeko
- Preceded by: Prof Charles Mark Lwanga Olwenyi

Personal details
- Born: Pauline Byakika; 1973 (age 52–53) Kampala, Uganda
- Education: Makerere University (Bachelor of Medicine and Bachelor of Surgery) (MSc in Clinical Epidemiology and Biostatistics) (MMed in Internal Medicine); Trinity College Dublin (Doctor of Philosophy)
- Occupation: Physician; Internist; Epidemiologist; Infectious Diseases Consultant; Academic
- Known for: Academics and research

Pauline Byakika–Kibwika (née Pauline Byakika) is a Ugandan specialist physician, internist, epidemiologist, academic and researcher. She was appointed and announced as the vice chancellor of Mbarara University of Science and Technology in August 2024 after emerging the best out of the 5 candidates shortlisted for the job. She previously served as a professor of medicine at Makerere University College of Health Sciences. From 2017 until 2019, she served as the vice president of the Uganda Medical Association, a professional industry association that champions medical doctors' interests in Uganda.

== Background and education ==
She was born in the Eastern Region of Uganda circa 1973. She attend St Theresa’s Namagunga Primary Boarding School from Primary one to seven and crosses to Mt St Mary’s College Namagunga, where she attended from S1 to S6 and she was admitted to the Makerere University, where she studied human medicine. Pauline excelled at all levels as one of the best ten students in the country. She graduated with a Bachelor of Medicine and Bachelor of Surgery (MBChB) degree in 1999. She followed that with a Master of Medicine (MMed) degree in Internal Medicine, also from Makerere University. Her third degree was a Master of Science (MSc) in Clinical Epidemiology and Biostatistics, obtained from Makerere University. She also holds a Doctor of Philosophy (PhD) in Clinical Pharmacology obtained from the Trinity College Dublin, in Dublin, Ireland. Her PhD thesis analyses the drug-to-drug interactions between antimalarials and Anti-retroviral drugs.

== Career ==
Byakika started out as a medical officer at Mulago National Referral Hospital and over time rose in status through senior house officer (SHO), registrar and finally consultant in the department of Medicine at the hospital.

She concurrently taught at Makerere University College of Health Sciences, which uses Mulago Hospital as its teaching hospital. She rose through the ranks, over the years, from research associate, assistant lecturer, lecturer, senior lecturer, to the rank of associate professor, and full Professor of Medicine and Epidemiology as of August 2018. She has also worked at the university's Infectious Diseases Institute.

In 2017, Pauline Byakika, MBChB, MMed (Medicine), MSc, PhD, was elected to serve as the vice president of the Uganda Medical Association, for the next two years. In addition to her duties, as a member of the nine-person executive committee, she was a member of the 55-person national governing council of the association.

On 5 August 2024, she was named as the third vice chancellor of Mbarara University of Science and Technology.

== Other considerations ==
Professor Byakika has authored or co-written over 100 peer-reviewed articles, in the areas of her medical expertise in different medical journals.

== See also ==
- Makerere University School of Medicine
- Mulago Hospital
