= Mbarara University =

Public University in Uganda

- Motto: Succeed We Must
- Established: 1989; 37 years ago
- Chancellor: Professor Pen-Mogi Nyeko
- Vice-Chancellor: Professor Pauline Byakika
- Administrative staff: 1,255 (2025)
- Students: 7,368 (2023)
- Location: Mbarara, Uganda; 0.616944°S 30.506667°E
- Campus: Urban
- Website: www.must.ac.ug
- Location within Uganda

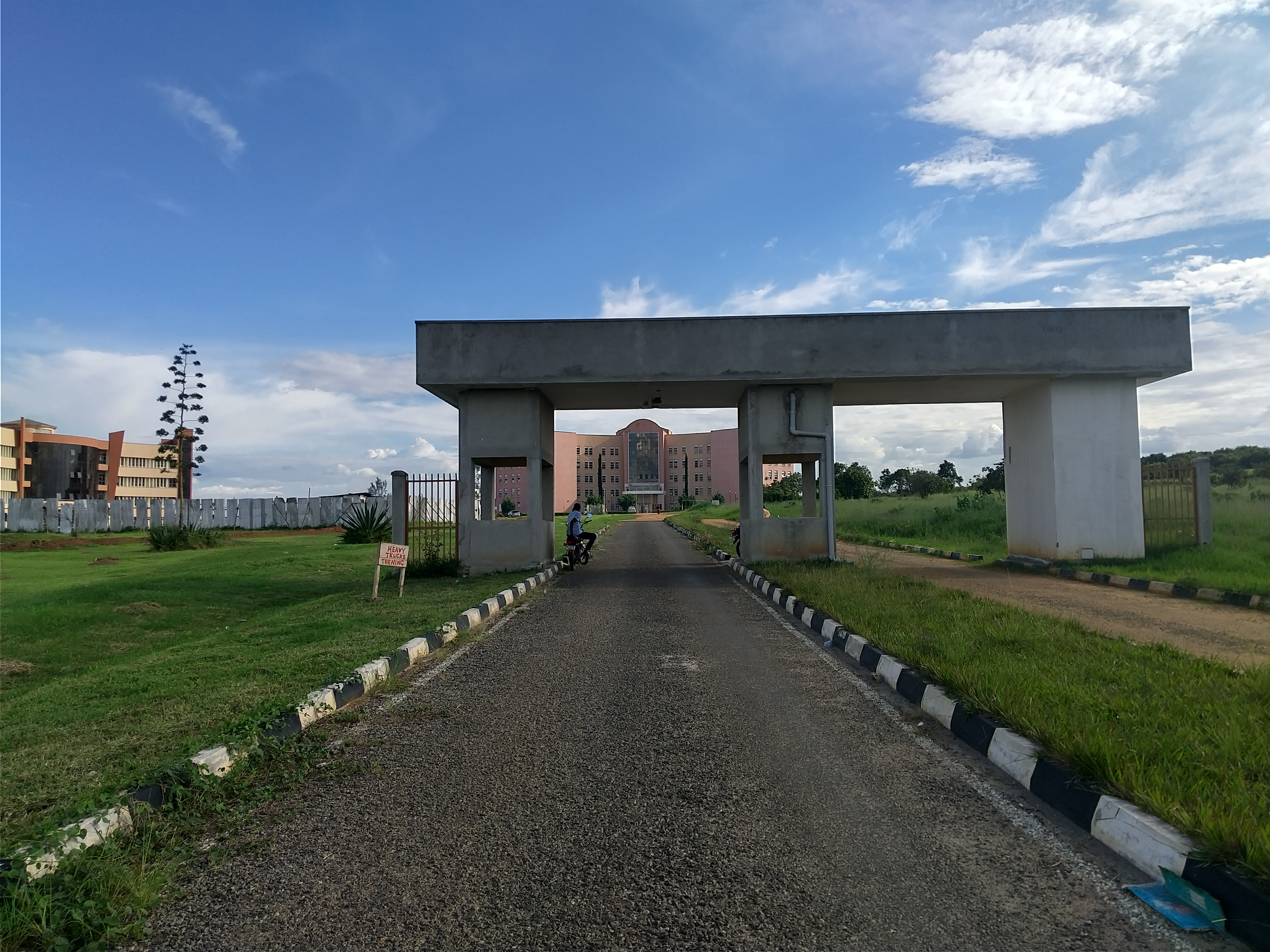
Mbarara University

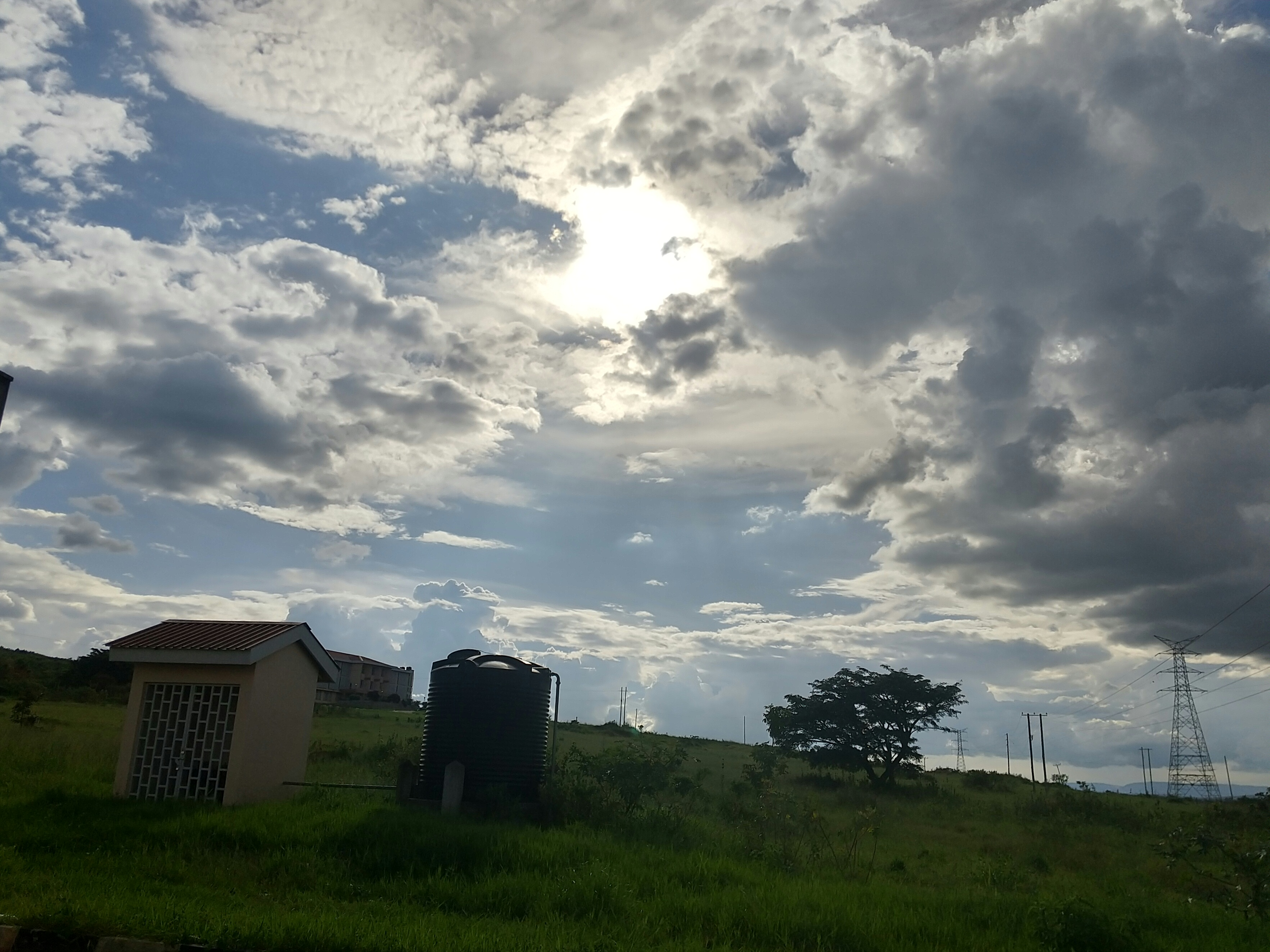
Sunny evening (5pm) in Kihumuro Campus at Mbarara University of Science and Technology

Mbarara University of Science & Technology (MUST), commonly known as Mbarara University, is a public university in Uganda. Mbarara University commenced student intake and instruction in 1989. It is one of the ten public universities and degree-awarding institutions in the country. MUST is accredited by the Uganda National Council for Higher Education.

== Location ==
The university has two campuses:

- The Mbarara Campus is in the town of Mbarara, on the Mbarara-Kabale Highway, approximately 269 kilometres (167 mi) southwest of Kampala, Uganda's capital and largest city. The coordinates of the university campus are 0.616944°S 30.506667°E.
- The Kihumuro Campus is in the suburb of Kihumuro, approximately 7 kilometres (4.3 mi), by road, west of Mbarara's central business district along the Mbarara-Bushenyi Road. The campus sits on 139 hectares (340 acres) of land, away from city noise. Once construction is completed, it will house all university faculties and institutes except the College of Health Sciences, which will remain at the Mbarara Campus. The Uganda government has spent USh5 billion (approx. US$2 million) of its own money on the construction. It has also secured a US$12 million loan from the African Development Bank to move the construction along.

== History ==
The university was founded in 1989 to address the shortage of scientists in Uganda and to instill a sense of community service in its students.

== Faculties and institutes ==
As of January 2022, MUST has six faculties and two institutes:

- Faculty of Medicine
- Faculty of Science
- Faculty of Applied Sciences and Technology
- Faculty of Computing and Informatics
- Faculty of Business and Management Sciences
- Faculty of Interdisciplinary Studies
- Institute of Tropical Forest Conservation
- Maternal Newborn and Child Health Institute

== Courses ==
The courses offered at the university include:

=== Undergraduate courses ===
- Bachelor of Medicine and Bachelor of Surgery
- Bachelor of Science in Nursing
- Bachelor of Science in Physiotherapy
- Bachelor of Science with Education
- Bachelor of Science
- Bachelor of Pharmacy
- Bachelor of Medical Laboratory Science
- Bachelor of Computer Science
- Bachelor of Information Technology
- Bachelor of Business Administration
- Bachelor of Science in Pharmaceutical Sciences
- Bachelor of Science in Petroleum Engineering and Environmental Management
- Bachelor of Science in Electronics and Electrical Engineering
- Bachelor of Science in Biomedical Engineering
- Bachelor of Science in Software Engineering

== Students and staff ==
As of January 2011, the student body numbered 3,163 undergraduates and 62 postgraduates. The university employs over 200 staff members.

MUST at glance by January 2023; 6,043 undergraduates, 1,325 postgraduates and 19,969 alumni.

== Governance ==
Mbarara University of Science and Technology is administered by three bodies; the University Council, the University Senate and the University Top Management.

=== University Council ===
The University Council is the supreme organ of the university responsible for the overall administration and ensuring that the establishment objectives and functions of the university are duly implemented. The council members are drawn from stakeholders including university staff, students, and members from the Ministry of Education, other government departments, University Convocation, the Private Sector and the general public.

=== University Senate ===
The University Senate is responsible for overall administration, of all academic programs. The current Senate is instituted in accordance with the provisions of the Universities and other Tertiary Institutions Act of 2001, as enacted by the Parliament of Uganda.

=== Top management ===
The top management consists of the vice chancellor, deputy vice chancellor, university secretary, academic registrar, dean of students, and the executive director of Mbarara Hospital.

== University teaching hospital ==
The university teaching hospital is Mbarara Regional Referral Hospital, a 600-bed public hospital that also serves as the referral hospital for the districts of: Mbarara, Bushenyi, Ntungamo, Kiruhura, Ibanda, Mitooma, Sheema, Buhweju, Isingiro and Rubirizi.

== Notable alumni ==
- Lynnette Tumwine Kyokunda, pathologist

== See also ==
- Education in Uganda
- List of universities in Uganda
- List of university leaders in Uganda
- Mbarara
- List of medical schools in Uganda
- Francis Mwijukye
