= Uganda National Examinations Board =

National assessment body in Uganda

Agency overview
- Formed: 1983
- Jurisdiction: Government of Uganda
- Headquarters: Kampala, Uganda
- Agency executive: Dan Nokrach Odongo, Executive Secretary
- Parent department: Ministry of Education and Sports (Uganda)
- Website: www.uneb.ac.ug

Uganda National Examinations Board (UNEB) is a national assessment body in Uganda, established in 1983 by an act of Parliament. The UNEB Secretariat is headed by the Executive Secretary, who acts as the chief executive and accounting officer of the board.

== Mandate ==
UNEB is a body corporate mandated to conduct and manage examinations at the end of the educational cycle at both primary and secondary school levels. It is also authorized to conduct examination-related research.

== Examinations ==
The board is responsible for the administration and award of national examinations including:

- Uganda Primary Leaving Examination (PLE)
- Uganda Certificate of Education (UCE)
- Uganda Advanced Certificate of Education (UACE)

Students can access their results through the UNEB Web Portal or by SMS by sending their index number to 6600.

== Leadership ==
The Executive Secretary of UNEB is currently Dan Nokrach Odongo, appointed by the Ministry of Education and Sports. The board is governed by a Chairperson appointed by the President of Uganda.

== Reforms and Developments ==
In recent years, UNEB has implemented digital systems for registration and results access, and has enhanced measures against examination malpractice.

== See also ==
- Education in Uganda
- Ministry of Education and Sports (Uganda)
