= List of Ugandan poets =

This is a list of noted Ugandan poets, poets born or raised in Uganda, whether living there or overseas, and writing in one of the Languages of Uganda.

== A-C ==
- Grace Akello
- Monica Arac de Nyeko
- Austin Bukenya
- Mildred Barya
- Ber Anena
- Lillian Aujo
- Busingye Kabumba

== D-J ==
- Jessica Horn
- Ivan Edwards

== K-L ==
- Kabubi Herman
- Kagayi Peter
- Mary Karooro Okurut
- Lubwa p'Chong

== M-N ==
- Mukotani Rugyendo
- Mulumba Ivan Matthias
- Christopher Henry Muwanga Barlow
- Philippa Namutebi Kabali-Kagwa
- Richard Carl Ntiru
- John Nagenda
- Nakisanze Segawa
- Susan Nalugwa Kiguli
- Beverley Nambozo
- Elvania Namukwaya Zirimu
- Jennifer Nansubuga Makumbi
- Jason Ntaro

== O ==
- Julius Ocwinyo
- James Munange Ogoola
- Okello Oculi
- Okot p'Bitek

== P-S ==
- Ife Piankhi
- Rajat Neogy
- David Rubadiri
- John Ruganda
- Eneriko Seruma

== T-Z ==
- Taban Lo Liyong
- Nick Twinamatsiko
- Hilda Twongyeirwe
- Timothy Wangusa
- Ayeta Anne Wangusa
- Samuel Iga Zinunula

== See also ==
- List of poets
- List of Ugandan writers
