= List of books from Uganda =

This is a list of notable books written by writers hailing from or living in Uganda.

- Abyssinian Chronicles (1998) by Moses Isegawa.
- The African Saga (1998) by Susan Nalugwa Kiguli.
- Building the nation and other poems (2000) by Christopher Henry Muwanga Barlow.
- Fate of the Banished (1997) by Julius Ocwinyo.
- The First Daughter (1996) by Goretti Kyomuhendo
- Footprints of the Outsider (2002) by Julius Ocwinyo.
- A Good African Story: How a Small Company Built a Global Coffee Brand (2013) by Andrew Rugasira.
- Kintu (2014) by Jennifer Nansubuga Makumbi.
- The price of memory after the tsunami (2000) by Mildred Barya.
- Reason as the World Masterpiece (2021) by Hamis Kiggundu.
- Recipe for Disaster (1994) by Lillian Tindyebwa.
- Resonance of the Soul: Flowers and Harmonics (2025) by Dr Ivan Edwards.
- Song of Lawino (1966) by Okot p'Bitek
- Songs of paradise: a harvest of poetry and verse (2009) by James Munange Ogoola.
- Success and Failure Based on Reason and Reality (2018) by Hamis Kiggundu
- Tropical Fish (2005) by Doreen Baingana.

== See also ==
- List of Ugandan writers
