= Zirimu =

Zirimu is a surname. Notable people with the surname include:

- Elvania Namukwaya Zirimu (1938–1979), Ugandan poet
- Pio Zirimu (died 1977), Ugandan linguist
