= First Daughter =

(The) First Daughter may refer to:

- The daughter of a republic's head of state; see first family
  - First family of the United States
- First Daughter (Brack), a 1955 painting by John Brack
- First Daughter (1999 film), a television film starring Monica Keena and Mariel Hemingway
- First Daughter (2004 film), a feature film starring Katie Holmes
- The First Daughter (novel), a novel by Ugandan author Goretti Kyomuhendo
