= Patrick Mangeni =

Ugandan writer, poet and playwright

- Born: Patrick Mangeni wa’Ndeda; Uganda
- Education: Makerere University,
- Occupations: Academic, writer
- Writing career
- Genre: Plays
- Notable works: "Operation Mulungusi", "The prince".

Patrick Mangeni Wa’Ndeda a Ugandan writer, poet and playwright. He is the author of two plays, Operation Mulungusi, and The Prince, and a children's novel, The Great Temptation.

He was a guest poet at the 2003 Queensland Poetry Festival and one of the featured writers at the 2005 Brisbane Writers Festival. His plays Operation Mulungusi and The Prince won the National Book Trust of Uganda Award (NABOTU) 2000 and he was nominated for the Uganda Literature Prize 2001.

== Early life and education ==
Mangeni's initial training in theatre was at Makerere University’s Music, Dance and Drama Department and later at University of Leeds where he earned a Master of Arts in theatre Studies, before earning a PhD in Applied Theatre from Griffith University, Australia. He is professional teacher with BA Ed degree from Makerere University, Certificate in University Teaching and a Certificate in Higher Degree Supervision, both from Griffith University. He also holds a Certificate in Distance Learning Writing Development (Crossing Borders program), Lancaster University and British Council, Uganda.

== Writing ==
Mangeni has written more than five community theatre plays. He has hosted a series of programmes, as well as written plays for both radio and television. He has directed more than seven theatrical productions in Uganda, Kenya, and Norway. He has received a number of fellowships and awards including: School of Art Scholarship for A PhD, School of Art, Griffith University, Australia; Creative Writing Fellowship, Poet in residence, Akademie Schloss Solitude, Stuttgart, Germany; Certificate of recognition for Contribution to the Development of Literature and Writing in Uganda by FEMRITE, Kampala; Nominatation for the Uganda Literature Prize 2002 for plays: Operation Mulungusi and the Prince; Uganda National Book Trust Literary Award: Operation Mulungusi and the Prince; and Commonwealth Scholarship for MA (Theatre Studies) University of Leeds, UK.

== Published works ==
=== Children's novel ===
- The Great Temptation. Fountain Publishers. 2003.

=== Plays ===
- Operation Mulungusi. MK Publishers. 2000.
- The prince. MK Publishers. 2000.

=== Shortstory collection ===
- A Leopard in my Bed and other stories. Mallory International. 2006. ISBN 978-1856571050.

=== Poems ===
- "A Breakfast", "Limbo" and "Woman" in Uganda Poetry Anthology 2000. Fountain Publishers. 2000. ISBN 978-9970022038.

=== Papers ===
- "Negotiating Learning Contexts: Some Experiences of Culture, Power and Gender in working with Multi-cultural Communities through Theatre for Development". In L. McCammon and A. McLauchlan (eds) (2006), Universal Mosaic of Drama and Theatre:The IDEA 2004 Dialogues. IDEA: Toronto
- "Theatre as a social Intervention". In RIDE 10:3 pp. 381–383, 2005.
- Two TFD Radio plays Obwenzi and Entalo; Leeds African Studies Bulletin, No. 67, 2005.
- "Building for the future: Challenges and opportunities of children’s theatre in Uganda". In E. Wamala, S. et al. (eds). Africa in world affairs: Challenges to humanities (pp. 181–190). Kampala: Makerere University, Faculty of Arts
- "Theatre for Development as a Strategy for Improved Sanitation and Accountability: The Mulago II Project". In K. Mukwaya et al. (eds) (2004), Africa: Communications challenges in the 21st Century, Kampala: Makerere University.
- "A theatrical Approach to the writing of a National Constitution: The case of Uganda", Drama Australia Journal 24:1 2000
- "One Earth One Family: Drama & Environment Education". In J. O’Toole & M. Lepp (eds) (2000). Drama for life: Stories of adult learning and empowerment. Brisbane: Playlab Press,
- "Change in two hours: A theatre for development workshop with high school students in Kampala": RIDE, 3:1, 93-96
- "The Challenge of Theatre, Culture and Community Development". In Ed. O. Mumma et al. (eds) (1998). Orientations of drama, Theatre and Culture (pp. 12–19). Nairobi: KDEA Nairobi.
- "A Theatrical Alternative for Child Survival: The Experience of School Health Drama in Uganda". In J. O’Toole and K. Donnelan (eds) (1996), education, Culture and empowerment. Idea Dialogues. IDEA: Brisbane.
