= Rajat =

Rajat may refer to:

- Rajʽa (also spelled rajʽat) refers to the Second Coming in Islamic terminology
- Rajat Gupta, Indian-American businessman
- Rajat Kapoor, Indian actor and director
- Rajat Neogy, Indian-Ugandan writer
- Rajat Tokas, Indian actor
- Rajat Deshmukh, Mansion house depleter
