= Kaberuka =

Kaberuka is an African surname. Notable people with the surname include:

- Donald Kaberuka (born 1951), Rwandan economist
- Jane Kaberuka (born 1956), Ugandan writer
