= Neogy =

Neogy is a surname. Notable people with the surname include:

- Rabindra Chandra Neogy (1909–2002), Indian revolutionary
- Kshitish Chandra Neogy (1888–1970), Indian politician
- Rajat Neogy (1938–1995), Ugandan poet
