= Hope Keshubi =

A Ugandan author, educator and one of the founding members of Femrite

Hope Keshubi (born 1961-1999), also known as Mwanaki, was a Ugandan writer and teacher known for contributing to Uganda's contemporary literary scene. Her work explores themes such as social transformation, youth empowerment, education, culture and, experiences of women and communities in Uganda. Her first novel was Going Solo (Fountain Publishers, 1997). The novel was well received and regarded within Uganda's literary and educational communities. Going Solo has since become the subject of scholarly analysis in academic recognition.

== Early life and education ==
Hope Keshubi was born in Kanungu on June 15, 1961, to Elly Joy Mwanaki (née Lutagwera) and Ephraim Mwanaki. Keshubi was the first born child out of the 8 children born to her parents who were primary school teachers. She attended Bweranyangi and Kyebambe Girls' schools for her secondary education. She later on joined the National Teacher's College, which is now Kyambogo University, to pursue a Diploma in Education. Furthermore, she graduated with a Bachelor's degree in Education from the Institute of Teacher Education, Kyambogo. For further studies, she earned a Certificate in Academic English and study skills for language teaching and linguistics at the University College of St. Mark and St. John, United Kingdom. Further still, she pursued a Master of Education Degree and specialized in teaching English at the University of Exeter.

== Career ==
In the early 1990s, Keshubi begun actively writing and had a number of unpublished manuscripts hence developing an interest in storytelling and literature. She wrote books that address social issues and seek to inspire readers through fiction and non- fiction. Her work reflects on; community development, personal growth, and preserving cultural values. In addition to writing, Keshubi participated in literary activities that promote reading, creative writing, and Ugandan literature. She was recognized as one of the emerging voices among contemporary Ugandan authors though her career was cut short by her death in 1999.

Keshubi was one of the founding members of the Uganda Women Writers' Association (Femrite, 1994-1995). She was among the female writers invited by Mary Karooro Okurut to the initial meetings that led to the establishment of Femrite. The meetings, that were held at Makerere University, brought together a number of writers including Hilda J, Twongyeirwe, Susan Kiguli, and Keshubi to create an organization dedicated to supporting female writers in Uganda. During Femrite's formative years, the latter contributed to the organization's mission of increasing the visibility of Ugandan female writers.Her novels, particularly "Going Solo" and "To Young Women", were among her early works associated with the emerging generation of female writers hence helping to establish the organization's literary reputation.

Before and during Femrite's early years, Keshubi taught literature at the National Teachers'college in Nkozi. One of her students, Hilda Twongyeirwe, later became a leading figure in FEMRITE and its Executive Director. Twongyeirwe recalled that Keshubi already had several novel manuscripts, demonstrating her influence beyond her own publications.

== Legacy within FEMRITE ==
Keshubi Keshubi died in 1999; however, Femrite has continued to recognize her as one of its founding members. On its 20th anniversary, the organization acknowledged her passing as one of the significant losses in its history while honoring her contribution to building Uganda's women's literary movement.

== Publications ==
=== Novels ===
- Going Solo
- To a Young Woman

=== Short fiction ===
- "Joanitta's Nightmare"

== See also ==
- Hilda Twongyeirwe
- Mary Karooro Okurut
- List of Ugandan writers
