= Fate of the Banished =

1997 novel by Julius Ocwinyo

- First edition
- Author: Julius Ocwinyo
- Language: English
- Publisher: Fountain Publishers
- Publication date: 1997
- Publication place: Uganda
- Media type: Print (hardback & paperback)
- ISBN: 9789970021017
- Followed by: Footprints of the Outsider

Fate of the Banished is a novel by Ugandan author Julius Ocwinyo. It was first published in 1997 by Fountain Publishers.

== Plot ==
The story centres on Father Santos Dila – the embodiment of Christian virtue, having trained from the Gregorian University in Italy, and who is now the parish priest. Father Santos falls in love with Flo, the wife of a rebel. It is set in a war torn area, the characters are furious, bitter and are ready to act with little remorse in the face of mischief against them or provocation. When Father Santos gets involved with Flo, he puts his life on the line. The story involves an investigation of whether the cleric was fully prepared by his priestly training to resist any temptation from the beautiful sister. Apire, Flo's husband, returns from the bush to find his wife with Father Santos. He executes both of them and hands himself over to the police.

== Critical reception ==
Africa Book Club called it "a book with a powerful story, narrated excellently with prose that is filled with anecdotes and images of everyday conversation".

== Awards and recognition ==
- Won the 1997 Uganda Publishers and Booksellers Association (UPABA) award for best adult fiction
- Selected as one of the study texts for the A-level Literature syllabus in Uganda
