= Nakisanze Segawa =

Ugandan poet and storyteller

- Born: Uganda
- Occupation: Writer
- Writing career
- Genres: Poetry, fiction
- Notable work: The Triangle

Nakisanze Segawa is a Ugandan poet and storyteller. She took third place in the 2010 Beverley Nambozo Poetry Award for her poem "The hustler". She was a participant in the Ebedi International Residency in Iseyin, Nigeria, in January 2015.

== Writing ==
Nakisanze Segawa is a performance poet who recites her poems in Luganda and English. Her work has been published in a number of anthologies. Her novel The Triangle was published in 2016.

== Published works ==
=== Novels ===
- The Triangle. Mattville Publishing House. 2016. ISBN 978-9970-958-108.

=== Poems ===
- "Zibogola!" and "The hustler", in Beverley Nambozo Nsengiyunva, ed. (2014). A thousand voices rising: An anthology of contemporary African poetry. BN Poetry Foundation. ISBN 978-9970-9234-0-3.
- "I love school", in Dokatum, Okaka; Rose Rwakasisi, eds. (2009). The Butterfly Dance: words and sounds of colour. Femrite Publications. ISBN 978-9970-700-18-9.
- "African sun" and "Jump", in Painted Voices: A collage of art and poetry, volume II. Femrite Publications. 2009. ISBN 978-9970-700-18-9.

=== Stories ===
- "Walking the Familiar Path", in Twongyeirwe, Hilda; Ellen Banda-Aaku, eds. (2012). Summoning the Rains. Femrite Publications. ISBN 9789970700257.
- "JJ", in Twongyeirwe, Hilda; Aaron Mushengyezi, eds. (2011). Never Too Late. Femrite Publications. ISBN 9789970700233.
- "Luweero Triangle" in Jalada (2015)
