= Peter Kagayi =

Ugandan poet, lawyer and teacher

- Born: Peter Kagayi; Jinja, Uganda
- Education: Bachelor of Laws
- Alma mater: Makerere University
- Occupations: Writer, teacher
- Writing career
- Genre: Poetry
- Notable works: The headline that morning and other poems

Peter Kagayi is a Ugandan poet, lawyer and teacher. He is the author of a collection of poems, The headline that morning and other poems. He has served as the Anglophone Coordinator at Writivism, and President of The Lantern Meet of Poets.

== Background and education ==
Kagayi was born in Jinja District in Uganda, to Alimwingiza David and Namusobya Ruth. He graduated with a Bachelor of Laws from Makerere University.

He is one of the leading performance poets in Uganda. He has performed with The Lantern Meet of Poets and held a solo poetry performance, "The audience must say Amen". He is the founder and curator of a poetry platform, "The Poetry Shrine", held at the National Theatre in Kampala. His book, The headline that morning and other poems, was published in 2016. Kagayi also writes and performs as part of Kitara Nation, a group of writers and performers based in Kampala. Ugandan poets Daniel Omara, Fahima Babirye, Hawa Nanjobe, Andrew Tuusah and Begumya Rushongoza are also part of the group.

== Works ==
=== Poetry collections ===
- The Headline that morning and other poems. Sooo many stories. 2016. ISBN 9789970956005.

=== Poems ===
- "In 2065"
- "Last night I told a stranger about you"
