= Judicial Reform Committee of South Sudan =

Government legal reform body

- Abbreviation: JRC
- Formation: July 28, 2022; 3 years ago
- Location: Juba, South Sudan
- Fields: Legal reform
- Chairperson: James Ogoola
- Deputy Chairperson: Joyce Aluoch
- Website: jrc.org.ss

The Judicial Reform Committee of South Sudan (JRC) was launched by the Government of South Sudan on 28 July 2022 to review laws, and to advise on judicial reforms and restructuring of the judiciary.

== Background ==
The JRC was established under the Revitalized (power sharing) Agreement for the Resolution of the Conflict in South Sudan, which was signed on 12 September 2018 and has the same force as a constitution. The JRC was commissioned in Juba in July 2022.

The JRC was formed in the context of continued violence following the independence of South Sudan in 2011, combined with shocks such as the COVID-19 pandemic, exceptional flooding, and food and fuel scarcity due to the Russian invasion of Ukraine. All of these have caused growing crime and disputes. The majority of problems are resolved through traditional systems, but there are still almost two million unresolved legal issues annually.

The JRC describes its mandate as; "Make recommendations to the RTGoNU (Note: RTGoNU: Revitalized Transitional Government of National Unity) that will inform judicial reforms and restructuring of the judiciary. Working towards the separation of powers, independence of the judiciary and the supremacy of the rule of law in South Sudan".

== Personnel ==
As of 2022 the JRC was chaired by Lord Justice James Ogoola (Uganda) with deputy chair Lady Justice Joyce Aluoch (Kenya). In January 2023 Justice Ajonye Perpetua was Head of Secretariat of the JRC.

According to its website, the JRC has twelve members:

- Five from the Transitional Government of National Unity (TGoNU)
- Two from the Sudan People's Liberation Movement-in-Opposition (SPLM/A-IO)
- One from the South Sudan Opposition Alliance
- One from the former detainees
- Two from the Intergovernmental Authority on Development (IGAD)
- One from the other political parties.

The JRC has five working groups and a secretariat, supported by the United Nations Development Programme (UNDP), Japan, the European Union and the Kingdom of Netherlands. The working groups are responsible for Judicial Structure, Alternative Dispute Resolution, Judicial Service Commission, Training, capacity building and Technology, Constitutional court-

== Activities ==
In 2023 the committee consulted with stakeholders in areas such as Western Bahr el Ghazal, Western Equatoria, Upper Nile State, and the Greater Pibor Administrative Area. They talked to administrators, politicians, lawyers, women, youth and so on to obtain views from all sectors of society.

The third JRC workshop was conducted by the Max Planck Foundation for International Peace and the Rule of Law over three days in May 2023. It covered The Structure of the Judiciary in Federal Systems of Government. Committee members reviewed and discussed different systems adopted by different countries, and thoughts on which model would best suit South Sudan.
