= My Husband Has Gone =

Poem by Mukotani Rugyendo

- Author: Mukotani Rugyendo
- Language: Runyankole-Rukiga
- Genre: Poetry
- Publication date: 1969
- Publication place: Uganda
- Media type: print

"My Husband Has Gone" ("Ibanyi Agyenzire" in Runyankole-Rukiga) is a poem by Ugandan writer Mukotani Rugyendo, composed originally in Runyankole-Rukiga in 1969 and translated into English for an anthology shortly thereafter. It is a popular feature of East African secondary school examinations and has also featured in Oxford's English collection from the region.

== History ==
Rugyendo originally penned the poem in his Senior Six at Ntare School in Mbarara. Some time later Richard Ntiru, editor of the poetry collection Tensions, and an old schoolmate, wrote to him from Uganda Publishing House in Kampala, where he was doing vacation work, to let him know that the house was looking to collect poems originally composed in mother tongues and translated by their authors into English. Rugyendo complied, submitting two pieces in both forms. One was "My Husband Has Gone".

When he went to Dar es Salaam for his university studies in 1970, Rugyendo almost completely forgot about the poems. In January 1971, Idi Amin came to power, and he observed the disorienting effect on the lives of his peers, not least of all the high-ranking managers at Uganda Publishing House: "that," he wrote some 35 years later, "seems to have been the end of the [Ntiru] project." The poem remained unpublished.

The next time Rugyendo, still in Dar es Salaam, encountered it was when the Oxford University Press contacted him from Nairobi, seeking the right to publish the English version in a collection of verse from East Africa. He saw no reason to refuse and promptly jumped at the chance, omitting in the process to ask where the publishers had found the poem and what had become of its mother-tongue version.
