= Rajat Neogy =

Ugandan-born poet

- Born: 17 December 1938; Kampala, Uganda
- Died: 3 December 1995 (aged 56); San Francisco, California, United States
- Education: School of Oriental and African Studies, University of London
- Occupations: Writer, poet, editor, publisher
- Years active: 1961–1995
- Known for: Founder and editor of Transition Magazine
- Notable work: Transition Magazine

Rajat Neogy (17 December 1938 – 3 December 1995) was a Ugandan of Indian Bengali ancestry, was a writer, poet and publisher. In Kampala in 1961, at the age of 22, he founded Transition Magazine, which went on to become one of the most influential literary journals in Africa. In the words of Ngugi wa Thiong'o, "he (Neogy) believed in the multi-cultural and multifaceted character of ideas, and he wanted to provide a space where different ideas could meet, clash, and mutually illuminate. Transition became the intellectual forum of the New East Africa, and indeed Africa, the first publisher of some of the leading intellectuals in the continent, including Wole Soyinka, Ali Mazrui and Peter Nazareth."

== Biography ==
Neogy was born and grew up in Kampala, Uganda. He studied anthropology at the School of Oriental and African Studies in London, where he also worked as a scriptwriter for the British Broadcasting Corporation. After returning to Uganda in 1961, Neogy founded Transition, which soon came to be considered the leading journal of free expression in Africa. In 1962, he also played a leading role in organising the influential 1962 Makerere Conference for African Writers of English Expression, which brought together African and African American writers including Ngũgĩ, J.P. Clark and Langston Hughes. However, the success of Transition also placed Neogy under new political pressure. In 1967, it was revealed that Transition had indirectly received CIA funding through the Congress for Cultural Freedom (CCF), a cultural body which aimed to sponsor anti-communist writing across the developing world. Neogy claimed that he had been unaware of the source of CCF funding, but he was strongly criticised by members of Uganda's ruling Obote regime. In 1968, after Transition published a long editorial critical of the Ugandan government's authoritarianism, he was charged with sedition and spent months in detention before being acquitted and released. Leaving Uganda, he moved to Ghana in 1970, where he resumed publishing Transition with Wole Soyinka taking over as editor. Neogy then settled in the United States.

Neogy died at the age of 57 at his home in San Francisco, where he had lived for two decades.

Born a Hindu, Neogy would eventually convert to Islam. At first he wanted to do it publicly at the Kibuli mosque, but his friend Ali Mazrui dissuaded him, telling him that it would be better to convert privately.

== Career and legacy ==
=== Founding Transition ===
At just 22 years old, Neogy founded Transition in Kampala in 1961, just before Uganda gained independence. The magazine quickly became the premier intellectual forum of the new East Africa, with a pan-African and international reach.

=== Editor and publisher ===
As editor, Neogy published early works by a constellation of future literary giants, including Wole Soyinka, Chinua Achebe, Ngũgĩ wa Thiong'o, and Nadine Gordimer. The magazine was known for its "questing irreverence" and refusal to shy away from sensitive political topics, including an early critique of Kwame Nkrumah's regime and discussions of race relations in Uganda.

=== Advocacy for free expression ===
Neogy believed in the "multi-cultural and multifaceted character of ideas" and provided a space where different viewpoints could meet and clash. His commitment to free speech led to his most notable legal battle when he was arrested for sedition in 1968 after publishing articles critical of the Ugandan government's authoritarianism under President Milton Obote.

=== Imprisonment and exile ===
Neogy spent months in solitary confinement as an Amnesty International "Prisoner of Conscience" before his eventual acquittal and release. Brutalized and disillusioned by his imprisonment, he left Uganda in 1969, moving the magazine first to Ghana, and eventually handing over editorship to Wole Soyinka.

=== Later life and legacy ===
Neogy settled in San Francisco, where he lived the final two decades of his life, passing away in 1995. The magazine he founded was later resurrected at Harvard University and continues to be a leading global cultural magazine today. The Rajat Neogy Editorial Fellowship was created to honor his trailblazing work and support new editorial talent.

== See also ==
- Jason Ntaro
- Richard Carl Ntiru
- Okello Oculi
- Julius Ocwinyo
- James Munange Ogoola
- Okot p'Bitek
- Ugandan Americans
