= Ernest Bazanye =

Ugandan writer

- Born: Ernest Bazanye; Uganda
- Occupation: writer
- Writing career
- Genre: Humour
- Website: bazanye.com

Ernest Bazanye is a Ugandan journalist, blogger, author, and scriptwriter. He is best known for his humour column Ernest Bazanye's Bad Idea, which ran in the Sunday Vision newspaper from 2004 to 2018. He is the author of three children's novels , and his short stories have appeared in literary magazines Eclectica, Kalahari Review, Soomanystories, and published in the Africa Book Club anthology.

Bazanye has written humour and satire for The Daily Monitor, Suluzulu.com, Saraba Magazine, and is currently a weekly columnist with The Nile Post and The New Times of Rwanda.

He contributed to political satire shows What's Up Africa and Business Unusual as a writer and wrote as well as hosted the political comedy panel show Muwawa Club on Urban TV.

In 2015 his blog Shut Up I'm Thinking, was awarded best blog of the year at the Uganda Social Media Awards.

== Novels ==
- Bazanye, Ernest (2009). Chasing A Dream. Fountain Publishers.
- Bazanye, Ernest. I Will Miss Mr Kizito. Fountain Publishers.
- Bazanye, Ernest, Uncle Julius' Funeral, Fountain Publishers

== Short fiction ==
- "Brother Armand's Apostasy", in Daniel Musiitwa, ed. (2014). The Bundle of Joy and Other Stories from Africa: Africa Book Club Anthology: Volume 1 (2014). Aalvent Books. ISBN 978-1941221044.
- "LHR to EBB", Kalahari Review
- "You Never Learn" Eclectica.org
- Halfaman, Eclectica.org
- The Law of The Land, SoooManyStories.ug
