= Newton Isaac =

Ugandan author and media entrepreneur

- Education: Makerere University, Bachelor of Information Systems; Metropolitan International University,(BBA)
- Occupations: Author; Media entrepreneur

Newton Isaac, also known as Isaac Bizmart, is an Ugandan author and media entrepreneur. He is the author of Trump Unyielding, a political biography examining the career and presidency of Donald J. Trump.

His professional background includes commercial property management, marketing, and corporate communications in Uganda.He serves as business manager at Hamz International Real Estate in Dubai, United Arab Emirates, and is registered as a real estate broker with the Dubai Land Department.

== Early life and career ==
Isaac was born in Buwenge, Jinja District, in eastern Uganda. He completed his secondary education in Luwero District and subsequently studied Information Systems at Makerere University before obtaining a Bachelor of Business Administration degree from Metropolitan International University.

He worked in commercial property management in Kampala, including as a property manager for Haruna Enterprises.Isaac also served as a spokesperson and public relations manager for Ham Enterprises (U) Ltd.

In 2024, Isaac published Trump Unyielding: The Quest for America's 47th Presidency, a political biography examining the business career and political trajectory of Donald Trump. An expanded edition covering Trump's return to the presidency was issued in 2026.
