= Footprints of the Outsider =

2002 novel by Julius Ocwinyo

- Author: Julius Ocwinyo
- Language: English
- Publisher: Fountain Publishers
- Publication date: 2002
- Publication place: Uganda
- Media type: Print (hardback & paperback)
- Pages: 172
- ISBN: 9789970023431
- Preceded by: Fate of the Banished
- Followed by: The Unfulfilled Dream

Footprints of the Outsider is a novel by Ugandan author Julius Ocwinyo, published by Fountain Publishers in 2002.

== Plot ==
Footprints of the Outsider is set in Teboke Village in the Apac district of Uganda. The only brick structure in the village is the ginnery at Teboke trading centre set up by two Indians, Hippos and Ramchand. It revolves around Abdul Olwit, whose mother, Alicinora is a prostitute. As he grows, Abdul suffers ridicule not only from his peers but from his mother. Despite odds being against him, he graduates from Makerere University with a bachelor's of arts degree in economics, and becomes a teacher.

Abdul, seeking to work in government, goes to Adoli Awal, the Teboke Member of Parliament, for help. But because Adwong, Abdul's uncle is Adoli's political enemy, the latter refuses. Abdul is later arrested when Adoli thinks he is eyeing his parliamentary seat. Abdul is released and contests for the parliamentary seat. The clashes that break out on one of the campaign rallies leave some people hurt and others dead. The book seeks to find the candidate who will become Teboke's next MP.

== Reception ==
The book received four stars from The Independent.

== Awards ==
The novel won the Kinyara Award for best adult fiction (sponsored by the British Council) in 2004, and was reviewed by AllAfrica.com.
