= Laughing Child =

Painting by John Brack

- Artist: John Brack
- Year: 1958
- Type: oil on canvas
- Dimensions: 45.8 cm × 40.8 cm (18.0 in × 16.1 in)
- Location: Private collection; Melbourne

Laughing Child is a 1958 Modernist portrait painting by Australian artist John Brack. The painting depicts his daughter Charlotte as a young girl, in a dress and with messy hair, laughing.

Charlotte Brack said of the painting that "There's a message in the messy hair and the flying plait. For me it's about the chaos of being a child." Discussing portraiture, John Brack said "I am not interested in how she looks sitting in the studio, but in how she looks at all times, in all lights, what she looked like before and what she is going to look like, what she thinks, hopes, believes and dreams".

The painting was exhibited at Australian Galleries in Melbourne in 1958, where it was purchased by collector Cara Black for 50 Guineas. In June 2020, Laughing Child sold at auction for $915,000 (hammer price $750,000). A representative of the auction house claimed the painting to be one of the "most compelling representations of childhood" in Australian art.

== See also ==
- First Daughter, a 1955 portrait by Brack of his daughter Clara
