= Bake Robert Tumuhaise =

Ugandan author and motivational speaker

- Born: Bake Robert Tumuhaise
- Education: Makerere University
- Occupation: writer
- Writing career
- Genres: Novels, Inspirational books
- Notable work: Tears of my mother

Bake Robert Tumuhaise is a Ugandan author and motivational speaker. He is the author of an inspirational novel, Tears of My Mother, and a motivational book, Tapping God’s Blessings:Keys to Open Doors of Success in Your Life. He is the Managing Director of World Of Inspiration and founder of the Authors’ Forum in Uganda. He is the author of five published inspirational books, an inspirational Columnist with Saturday Vision (Uganda) and Sunday Times (Rwanda) and a director on the board of the Amakula International Film Festival. He graduated as a teacher from Makerere University.

== Early life and education ==
Bake was born in 1981 in Rubuduri, Kisoro district, near the Uganda-Democratic republic of Congo border, to Aloysius Bakesigaki and Mishemburo. He is the last born in a family of eight. He went to Rubuguru Primary school, St. Paul's Seminary Kabale, Iryaruvumba High School, Kigezi High School and Makerere University.

== Published works ==
- Four ways of making money. World of inspiration. 2019.
- Inspired By Bitature: Timeless lessons of Ugandan Millionaire. World of inspiration. 2019.
- Millionaire Farmer's Manual. World of inspiration. 2016.
- Millionaire Farmer. The Amazing story of Dr Emma Naluyima, Uganda's revolutionary Farmer. World of inspiration. 2016.
- Courageous woman: The moving story of Bella Wine's Prudence Ukkonika. World of inspiration. 2015.
- Woman of action: The story of Mary Mulumba, Uganda's leading Educationist and leader. World of inspiration. 2013.
- Tears of my mother: the Success Story of Nyamishana, the First Female President of Uganda'. World of inspiration. 2013.
- How to unleash your potential. World of inspiration. 2012.
- Tapping God's blessings: keys to open doors of success in your life. World of inspiration. 2008.
- Touching Heaven, Razing Hell. World of inspiration. 2007.
- Let your Kingdom come. World of inspiration. 2006.
