= Jane Kaberuka =

Ugandan writer

Jane Alison Kaberuka
- Born: 28 August 1956 (age 69) Bunyoro, Uganda
- Education: Makerere University; La Trobe University
- Genre: Fiction, autobiography
- Subject: Gender disparities, family
- Children: 4

Jane Alison Kaberuka (born 28 August 1956, Bunyoro) is a Ugandan writer of fiction and autobiography, and also a senior civil servant.

== Career ==
Kaberuka's education prepared her for science teaching, but in 1987, she was seriously hurt in a car accident. After extensive treatment she was able to walk. This incident and the aftermath led to her autobiographical work Has God forgotten me? The book includes letters she recorded or typed with one finger for her children to read when they were older.

Her next book was It's Natural Darling, a book about womanhood. An author's note comments on the widespread absence of discussion of sex even amongst family members.

Kaberuka decided to request an anti-corruption post in the office of the Inspector General of Government. She also worked as a columnist for a newspaper between 1992 and 1994.

In 1999 she published her novel Silent Patience which begins with an arranged marriage. It raises "questions about some of Uganda's traditional societal values" and looks at “gender discrimination” in 20th century East Africa. This book was published by Femrite, an organisation which encourages Ugandan women writers.

The Cherished Grass Widow came out in 2003. This novel explores difficulties women may face in marriage and challenges the practice of polygamy.

== Personal life ==
Kaberuka was born on 28 August 1956 in Bunyoro, Western Uganda. She went to Kyebambe Girls Secondary School but was delayed for a year in completing high school by difficulties relating to her Rwandan heritage. She eventually went to Gayaza High School. Kaberuka married at the age of nineteen, a decision "not made by herself", and then studied for her science degree at Makerere University. Her studies had to fit around babies and motherhood.

After graduating with a Bachelor of Science degree in biochemistry and zoology in 1979, she went to Australia with her husband and was awarded a Bachelor of Education degree in 1982 at La Trobe University. She did some science teaching and started a postgraduate degree at the University of New England. After the change of government in Uganda in 1986, she and her husband returned with their four young children in January 1987. He had been offered a job and she saw him as "head of the family", so did not press to finish her course before leaving Australia.

Within a few weeks, Kaberuka was seriously hurt in a car accident, dislocating her neck and losing sensation in her limbs. She was treated unsuccessfully in Nairobi and then taken to Germany for repeated surgery and prolonged treatment. Eventually, she recovered the ability to walk a little.

Her husband Will Kaberuka is an economist and presidential adviser who also comes from Western Uganda. They have two sons and two daughters.

== Bibliography ==
- Has God forgotten me? The cry of an accident victim Nairobi: Uzima Press, 1990.
- It's Natural Darling Nairobi: East African Publishers, 1991.
- Silent Patience Kampala: Femrite Publications 1999
- The Cherished Grass Widow Kampala: MK Publishers, 2003
