= Samuel Iga Zinunula =

Ugandan poet and Veterinary Assistant

- Born: Iga zinunula Samuel; 28 May 1964 (age 62); Uganda
- Occupations: Agribusiness Consulting, Farmer, Writer
- Writing career
- Genres: Poetry, fiction

Iga Zinunula is a Ugandan poet and Veterinary Assistant. He has engaged in rural development work all over Uganda since 1990. He is a member of the editorial board of FEMRITE. He has been a judge at the Babishai Niwe (BN) Poetry Foundation.

== Early life and education ==
Iga studied agriculture at Makerere University, majoring in livestock sciences. He earlier went to the Veterinary Training Institute, Entebbe. He did his Secondary School at Namasagali College, after sitting his Primary Leaving Examinations at Nakanyonyi Primary School in Jinja. From Primary One to Five he attended Nakyenyi Primary School in the Kabaka's old county of Buddu, in present day Lwengo District, Uganda.

== Writing ==
His poetry has been published in newspapers in Uganda, in Makerere University’s literary journal, Dhana, in the Uganda Poetry Anthology 2000 and in Painted Voices. His poem "Africa In Pain" has been used alongside work by renowned poets such as Susan Kiguli and Timothy Wangusa in profiling Ugandan literature.

== Published works ==
=== Poems ===
- "Talking donkeys", "Mbwa gwe oswaaza", in Beverley Nambozo Nsengiyunva, ed. (2014). A thousand voices rising: An anthology of contemporary African poetry. BN Poetry Foundation. ISBN 978-9970-9234-0-3.
- "My brother Abu" in Okaka Dokatum; Rose Rwakasisi, eds. (2009). The Butterfly Dance: words and sounds of colour. Femrite Publications. ISBN 978-9970-700-18-9.
- "Age holds you down", "Love fetches water" in Painted Voices: A collage of art and poetry, volume II. Femrite Publications. 2009. ISBN 978-9970-700-18-9.
- "Africa in pain", in Okot Benge and Alex Baingana, ed. (2000). Uganda Poetry Anthology 2000. Fountain Publishers. ISBN 978-9970022038.
