= Pio Zirimu =

Ugandan linguist and scholar (died 1977)

- Pio Zirimu in 1976
- Born: Pio Zirimu; Uganda
- Died: 1977
- Education: Makerere University; King's College Budo
- Occupations: Writer, academic
- Spouse: Elvania Namukwaya Zirimu
- Writing career
- Notable works: Black Aesthetics: Papers from a Colloquium Held at the University of Nairobi, June, 1971

Pio Zirimu (died 1977) was a Ugandan linguist, scholar and literary theorist. He is credited with coining the word "orature" as an alternative to the self-contradictory term, "oral literature" used to refer to the non-written expressive African traditions. Zirimu was also central in reforming the literature syllabus at Makerere University to focus on African literature and culture instead of the English canon.

== Early life and education ==
Zirumu was born in Buganda. He attended high school at King's College Budo, and subsequently went to Makerere University college, and the University of Leeds, where he was a contemporary of Ngũgĩ wa Thiong'o. While at Makerere, Zirimu met Ugandan poet and dramatist Elvania Namukwaya Zirimu. They were to marry a few years later. The marriage produced a daughter.

== Teaching ==
Zirimu later taught at the Institute of Languages Studies at Makerere University, where he was involved in the formulation of standards for judging emergent African literature in the 1960s. He was at the African Writers Conference held at Makerere on 1 June 1962 — officially called a "Conference of African Writers of English Expression", which was the first major international gathering of writers and critics of African literature on the African continent. It was also attended by many prominent African writers, including Chinua Achebe, Wole Soyinka, John Pepper Clark, Ezekiel Mphahlele, Bloke Modisane, Lewis Nkosi, Ngũgĩ wa Thiong'o (then known as James Ngugi), Ezekiel Mphahlele, Robert Serumaga, Rajat Neogy (founder of Transition Magazine), Okot p'Bitek and David Rubadiri.

== Published works ==
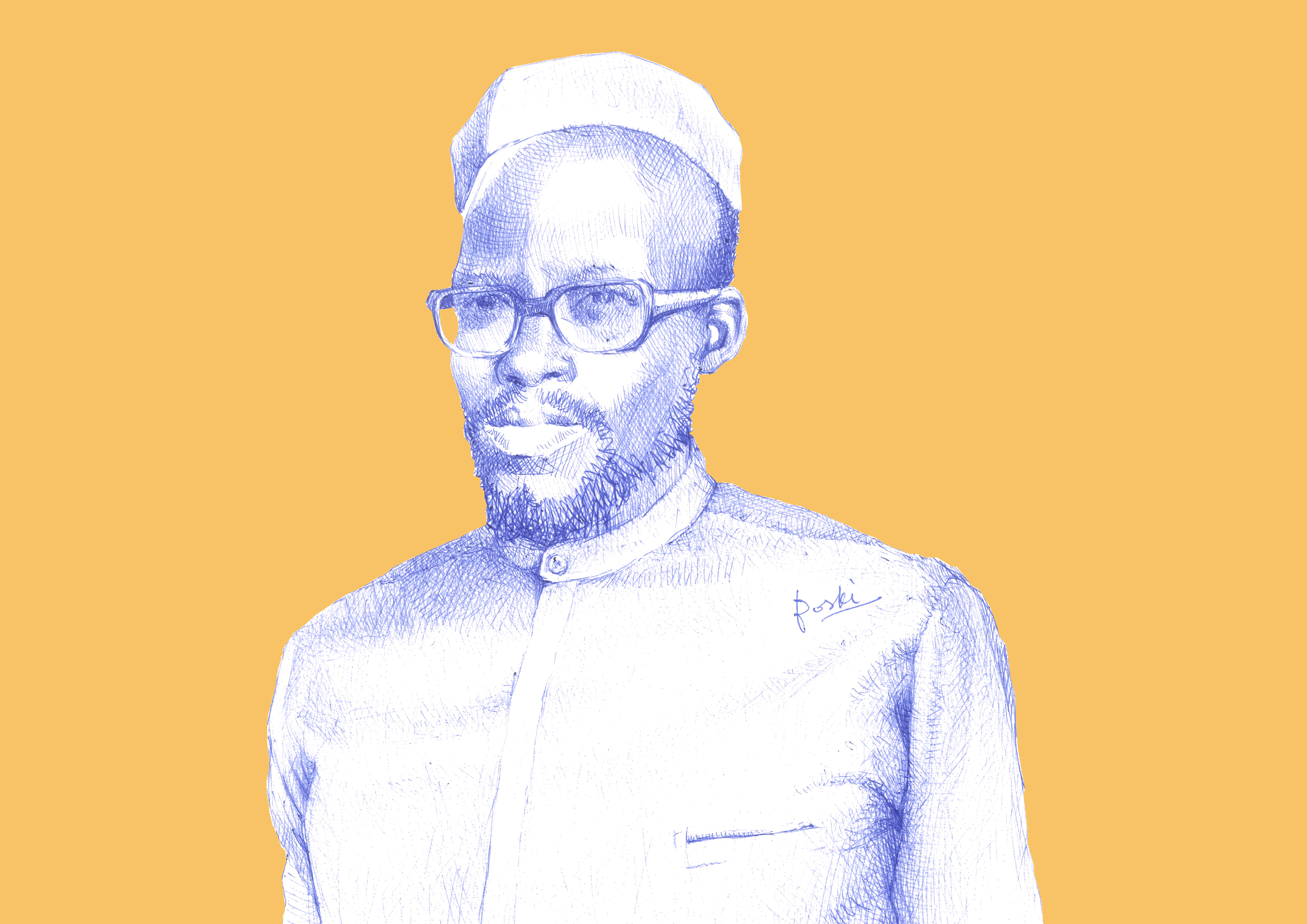
2022 portrait of Pio Zirimu by Enam Bosokah

- "An approach to Black Aesthetics", in Pio Zirimu; Andrew Gurr, eds. (1973). Black Aesthetics: Papers from a Colloquium Held at the University of Nairobi, June, 1971. East African Literature Bureau. ISBN 978-0860702573.
- "Oracy as a tool of development", in Pio Zirimu; Andrew Gurr, eds. (1973). Black Aesthetics: Papers from a Colloquium Held at the University of Nairobi, June, 1971. East African Literature Bureau. ISBN 978-0860702573. with Austin Bukenya
