= Building the Nation and Other Poems =

2000 book by Christopher Henry Muwanga Barlow

Building the nation and other poems
- Building the Nation and Other Poems
- Author: Christopher Henry Muwanga Barlow
- Language: English
- Publisher: Fountain Publishers
- Publication date: 2000
- Publication place: Uganda
- Media type: Print (hardback & paperback)
- Pages: 117
- ISBN: 9970021915

Building the Nation and Other Poems, published by Fountain Publishers in 2000, is a collection of 76 poems by Ugandan poet Christopher Henry Muwanga Barlow.

The poems are arranged into seven sections: "Politicians, servants and sycophants", "The jungles of humanity", "Arguments with God", "Random portraits", "Of nature", "The rich live amalgam", and "Of love and all that". The poems deal with diverse themes like political opportunism and sycophancy, war, the paradox of God and the richness and beauty of nature.

== Critical reception ==
The poems have received mainly positive reviews.
