= Mukotani Rugyendo =

Ugandan writer

- Born: January 1, 1949 (age 76); Kigezi District
- Occupations: Poet; Writer; Playwright; Journalist

Mukotani Rugyendo (born Kigezi, 1949) is a Ugandan poet, writer and journalist probably best known for his poem "My Husband Has Gone".

He graduated from the University of Dar es Salaam in 1973 where he edited a literary journal Umma. In 1977, he published The Barbed Wire and Other Plays (The Contest and And the Storm Gathers) in the Heinemann's African Writers Series. In the seminal article "Waiting for Amin: Two Decades of Ugandan Literature”, Ugandan scholar Peter Nazareth, now based at the University of Iowa, says of Rugyendo, “He has a radical approach to postcolonial problems, attempting to create revolutionary drama in content and form”.
