= Elvania Namukwaya Zirimu =

Ugandan poet (1938–1979)

- Born: Elvania Namukwaya; 31 August 1938; Bussi Island, Kalangala District, Uganda
- Died: 31 October 1979 (aged 41); Uganda
- Education: Makerere University; King's College Budo
- Occupations: Poet, dramatist
- Spouse: Pio Zirimu
- Writing career
- Notable works: Keeping up with the Mukasas; When the Hunchback Made Rain (1970); Snoring Strangers (1973)

Elvania Namukwaya Zirimu (31 August 1938 – 31 October 1979) was a Ugandan poet and dramatist. She formed the Ngoma Players, with the policy of writing and producing Ugandan plays, and was actively concerned with the National Theatre. She belonged to the early generation of English-language Ugandan writers and playwrights that includes novelist Okello Oculi, playwright John Ruganda, and novelist Austin Bukenya. Her best-known work is the one-act play Keeping up with the Mukasas, included in David Cook's 1965 anthology of East African plays, Origin East Africa.

== Biography ==
Elvania Namukwaya was born at Bussi Island, Kalangala District, in Uganda. She attended high school at King's College Budo, a coeducational school, where she distinguished herself as an actor and writer of plays. Namukwaya repeatedly featured in the school's many theatrical productions. Her early efforts at short-story writing appeared in the 1960 edition of the school's magazine, The Bodonian. She proceeded in 1961 to Makerere University for her Diploma in Education (1962). At Makerere, her play Keeping up with the Mukasas won the 1962 English Competition and the original play award in the Ugandan drama festival.

While at Makerere, Namukwaya met and fell in love with the Ugandan linguist and scholar Pio Zirimu. They married a few years later. The marriage produced a daughter.

In 1963, Namukwaya went to the University of Leeds where she earned a Bachelor of Arts degree in 1966. On her return to Uganda, she became a tutor at the teachers' training college at Kyambogo and later also at Makerere University. She helped found the Uganda National Choir in 1967. Also that year, she formed the Ngoma Players with a declared policy of writing and producing plays in the Ugandan mode, and acted in, or directed, at least twelve of their productions. From 1971 to 1979, she was active in the National Cultural Centre, helping to formulate the policy of the National Theatre (of which she became chair in 1978).

Her debut play, Family Spear, was first performed by the Ngoma Players in Kampala. It is a one-act play that deals with gender and generation tensions in a family where the man is expected to be the provider but the woman still has to work extremely hard to provide for her husband. Snoring Strangers, first performed by the Ngoma Players in 1973, is also a one-act play based on village rituals. Zirimu's best known play, When the Hunchback Made Rain, was first produced in 1970 and dramatises the interaction of human beings and supernatural powers. Her work portrayed social and political crises in the 1960s.

Making a second visit to Britain (1972–73) she worked with the Roy Hart Theatre and the Keskidee Centre and also presented the programme Break for Women for the BBC World Service. She produced Byron Kawadwa's Oluyimba twa Wankoko as Uganda's entry for FESTAC 77, and in addition produced television plays, served as a judge for several drama competitions, and was involved with many cultural festivals.

In 1979, she had been appointed Uganda's High Commissioner to Ghana and was preparing to leave Uganda to take up the appointment when she was killed in a car crash.

== Published works ==
=== Stories ===
- Kamasiira and Other Stories. East African Publishing House. 1980.
- "The Hen and Ground Nuts" in David Cook, ed. (1965). Origin East Africa: A Makerere Anthology. London: Heinemann Educational Books. ISBN 9780435900151.

=== Plays ===
- When the Hunchback Made Rain; Snoring Strangers. East African Publishing House. 1975.
- "African Spear" in Gwyneth Henderson, ed. (1973). African Theatre. London: Heinemann. ISBN 978-0435901349.
