= The First Daughter (novel) =

1996 novel by Goretti Kyomuhendo

The first daughter
- Author: Goretti Kyomuhendo
- Language: English
- Publisher: Fountain Publishers
- Publication date: 1996
- Publication place: Uganda
- Media type: Print (hardback & paperback)
- Pages: 113
- ISBN: 978-9970021192
- Followed by: Secrets No More

The First daughter
- Author: Goretti Kyomuhendo
- Language: English
- Genre: Contemporary literature, African literature
- Publisher: Fountain Publishers
- Publication date: 15 Nov. 1996
- Publication place: Uganda
- Media type: Print (hardback & paperback)
- Pages: 113
- ISBN: 978-9970021192
- Followed by: Secrets No More

The First Daughter is a novel by Ugandan author Goretti Kyomuhendo.. Published in 1996, it was the author's debut novel

== Plot ==
Kasemiire grows up in poverty, but her father is able to send her and her siblings to school. This he does, amidst scorn from other men who thinks all a woman has to do is to work in the kitchen.

Kasemiire gets pregnant in school and is abandoned by the father of her child. She has to work to support herself and her child. She impresses a politician who offers to help her by taking her to work in the city. Things do not go to plan after the politician's husband tries to rape her.

Kasemiire seeks refuge from the church, where with the help of a sympathetic nun, she goes back to school under their care. She goes up to university. There, she meets the father of her child, and the hatred she had concealed comes to the surface.
