= Jason Ntaro =

- Born: Jason Ntaro; Uganda
- Occupation: writer
- Writing career
- Genre: Poetry
- Website: jasonthepoet.wordpress.com

Jason Ntaro is a Ugandan poet, a former member of The Lantern Meet of Poets. He is a regular on poetry platforms in and around Kampala. He has performed at National Book Trust (NABOTU), BAYIMBA, Poetry in Session, Kwivuga, open mic, Azania (UCU), Mirrors, Phat fest, Guest performed with Tshila, Spoken word Rwanda, and Maurice Kiirya experience, in Uganda and beyond. He developed a following in 2011 after continually reciting his poem titled "3 years, 2 months, 5 days", a poem about an abusive relationship that results in death. The poet's performance involved removing his shoes and walking barefoot onto stage, after which he would take a deep breath.

== Early life and education ==
Jason was born in Uganda. He lived in Kenya for sometime before leaving for The Netherlands where he grew up. He went to a European School in Bergen, in the Netherlands. He returned to Uganda and attended Green hill academy for primary education, and Kiira College Butiki and Vienna College, for his secondary education.

== Published works ==
- "One day, someday will be this day", in Beverley Nambozo Nsengiyunva, ed. (2014). A thousand voices rising: An anthology of contemporary African poetry. BN Poetry Foundation. ISBN 978-9970-9234-0-3.
- "A Song for the Drowned soul", in Broken Voices of the Revolution. Lantern meet of poets. 2013.
- "Nonentity"
- "watching the rain ", at July 2014 Poetry in Session at The Hub, Kamwokya in Kampala, Uganda
- "Tug & War", at July 2014 Poetry in Session at The Hub, Kamwokya in Kampala, Uganda
- "Intimacy Minus Intricacy", at July 2014 Poetry in Session at The Hub, Kamwokya in Kampala, Uganda
