= Ellen Banda-Aaku =

Zambian writer (born 1965)

- Born: Ellen Banda; 6 May 1965 (age 61); Woking, Surrey, UK
- Education: University of Zambia(BA), Middlesex University(MA), University of Cape Town(MA)
- Occupation: Author
- Awards: Commonwealth Short Story Competition (2007); Winner of Penguin Prize for African Writing (2010)
- Website: ellenbandaaaku.com

Ellen Banda-Aaku (born 6 May 1965) is a Zambian author, radio drama and film producer who was born in the UK and grew up in Africa. She is the author of two novels and several books for children, and has had short stories published in anthologies and other outlets.

== Background ==
Born in Woking, Surrey, in 1965, she was the middle child of three, and grew up in Zambia. She was educated at the University of Zambia, where she obtained her BA in public administration, and she also holds an MA in financial management with social policy from Middlesex University and an MA in creative writing from the University of Cape Town.

== Writing career ==
Ellen Banda-Aaku's first book, Wandi's Little Voice, won the Macmillan Writer's Prize for Africa in 2004. Of the title, the judges stated that the author's style reveals a rare gift for revealing the truth and contradictions at the core of human relationships. In 2007 she won the Commonwealth Short Story Competition for her story "Sozi's Box". Her first novel, Patchwork, won the 2010 Penguin Prize for African Writing and was shortlisted for the 2012 Commonwealth Book Prize. In 2006 Banda-Aaku sat on the judging panel for the Macmillan Writer's Prize for Africa. African Writing Online, many literatures, one voice In 2012 she was awarded the Zambia Arts Council Chairpersons Ngoma Award for her outstanding achievements in literature. She has conducted creative writing workshops in Rwanda, South Africa, Uganda and Zambia.

Her short stories have been published in anthologies in Australia, South Africa, the UK and the US, including in New Daughters of Africa (edited by Margaret Busby, 2019).

In July 2020, Banda-Aaku was announced as chair of the panel judges for the Kalemba Short Story Prize 2020.

She is co-author with James Patterson of a children's book entitled The Elephant Girl, which was published in July 2022.

== Awards ==
- 2004: Winner of Macmillan Writers Prize for Africa – Most Promising New Writer Award
- 2007: Winner of Commonwealth Short Story Competition
- 2010: Winner of Penguin Prize for African Writing
- 2012: Zambia Arts Council Chairpersons Ngoma Award
- 2012: Nominated for the Commonwealth Book Prize

== Published works ==
=== Short stories ===
- "Sozi's Box" (winner of the 2007 Commonwealth Short Story Competition). Published in Cousins Across the Seas, Phoenix Education, Australia, 2008. ISBN 978-1-921085-73-4
- "Lost", in Jambula Tree and other stories, The Caine Prize for African Writing, 8th Annual Collection, Jacana Press, South Africa. ISBN 978-1-904456-73-5
- "Made of Mukwa", in The Bed Book of Short Stories, Modjaji Books, South Africa. ISBN 978-1-920397-31-9
- "Ngomwa", in African Women Writing Resistance: Contemporary Voices, Wisconsin Press, USA. ISBN 978-0-299-23664-9
- "87 Tangmere Court", in New Daughters of Africa, 2019.

=== Novels ===
- Patchwork, Penguin Publishers, South Africa, 2011. ISBN 978-0-14-352753-4.
- Madam 1st Lady, 2016. ISBN 9789982701167, OCLC 1042084009

=== Books for children ===
- Wandi’s Little Voice, Macmillan Educational Publishers, UK, 2004. ISBN 978-1-4050-6040-0
- Yours Faithfully Yogi, East African Educational Publishers, Kenya, 2008. ISBN 978-9966-25-556-3
- Twelve Months, Oxford University Press, Kenya, 2010. ISBN 978-0-19-573609-0
- Lula & Lebo, Head and Shoulders, Puo Publishing, South Africa. ISBN 978-0-9814386-7-2
- E is for e-waste, Worldreader, online publication.
- Sula and Ja, Farafina Tuuti (Kachifo Limited) and Worldreader.
