= A Good African Story =

2013 book by Andrew Rugasira

A Good African Story: How a Small Company Built a Global Coffee Brand
- First edition
- Author: Andrew Rugasira
- Language: English
- Publisher: The Bodley Head
- Publication date: 2013
- Publication place: Uganda
- Media type: Print (hardback and paperback)
- Pages: 254
- ISBN: 9781847922076

A Good African Story: How a Small Company Built a Global Coffee Brand is a 2013 book by the Ugandan businessman Andrew Rugasira. It is a story of "Good African coffee" from inception to becoming the first African company to have its products listed in supermarkets in the United Kingdom. It shows the trials and obstacles Rugasira faced, his journey in South Africa and his history as a businessman. It is an analysis of doing business in Africa and challenges businessmen, especially in Uganda, face to succeed.

== Critical reception ==
The book was met with mostly positive reviews.

Andrew Mwenda of The Independent called it "a book that combines intellectual depth with practical hands-on business experience. It is a must-read for those interested in the challenge to creating wealth through private entrepreneurial innovation and talent in Africa."

Harriet Lamb called it a good read.

Stephen Timm of Business Day called it "an inspiring story of how the continent is fast turning itself around". He added that "Africa needs more entrepreneurs to tell how they did it."

T. J. Strydom for The Times notes that "the story is a hopeful one and does show the first glimpses of how "trade not aid" should transform our continent." But he notes that "the book shows too much of Uganda's sad colonial (and post-colonial) past, and too little of Rugasira's entrepreneurial story. It could have been a decent in-depth feature article in a good magazine, not a book on its own."
