= Kabubi Herman =

Ugandan author and poet

- Born: Kabubi Herman; Uganda
- Occupation: Writer
- Writing career
- Genre: Poetry

Kabubi Herman is a Ugandan author and poet. He uses the stage name "Slim Emcee ". He is poetry teacher, as well as a performance poet. He took part in the spoken word project Kampala Uganda, in 2013.

== Life and literary career ==
Kabubi was born in Kampala, Uganda. He started writing poetry, singing and dancing at an early age. He has showcased at the International Youth Festival, Laba Street Art Festival, Bayimba International Festival, Lyricist Lounge Dar es Salaam, 53rd Edition of Blankets and Wine Nairobi and run a performance workshop at H.O.L.D among others. He is the coordinator for the EA Performing Arts market DOADOA. His first poem, “Val for Val” paved way for his writing career as well as for becoming one of the pioneers of performance poetry in Uganda, supporting each and every poetry night in Kampala.
