= Nick Twinamatsiko =

Ugandan writer and civil engineer

- Born: Nick Twinamatsiko; Uganda
- Education: Makerere University,
- Occupations: Civil engineer, writer
- Writing career
- Genres: Fiction, poetry
- Notable works: Chwezi Code, Jesse's Jewel

Nick Twinamatsiko is a Ugandan writer and civil engineer. He is the author of novels Chwezi Code, Jesse's Jewel; a Parable of the Lost Love, and Mug: the Chwezi guru, and a collection of poems, Till the Promised Land & Other Poems.

== Early life and education ==
He attended Mbarara municipal primary school, and subsequently went to Ntare school for his secondary level education. He joined Makerere University, where he graduated with a degree in civil engineering.

== Published works ==
=== Novels ===
- Mugu: the Chwezi guru. Pilgrims publications. 2010.
- The Chwezi Code. Pilgrims publications. 2010.
- Jesse's Jewel; a Parable of the Lost Love. Pilgrims publications. 2007.

=== Poetry collections ===
- Till the Promised Land & Other Poems. Pilgrims publications. 2004.
