= Ife Piankhi =

Ugandan writer

- Born: Ife Piankhi; London
- Occupation: Writer
- Writing career
- Genres: Poetry, fiction
- Website: ifepiankhi.com

Ife Piankhi is a Uganda-born poet, singer, creative facilitator and educator. She has collaborated with artists such as Keko, Nneka, Mamoud Guinea, Geoff Wilkinson, Michael Franti, Jonzi D, Wynton Marsalis, Floetry, among others. She has toured internationally for the past 30 years visiting Canada, Ghana, Sierra Leone, Zanzibar, Zambia, Romania, Italy, Holland, and USA. While living in London she was a regular on Colourful Radio, founded by Henry Bonsu. She has been featured in the documentaries 500 years later by Owen Shahadah and Nubian Spirit by Louis Buckley which highlight her knowledge of Nile Valley Civilisations. Ife started her career at 18 teaching African pre-history in a supplementary school called Aimhotep School of Knowledge. Since then she has continued to work as a teacher and facilitator. She co-ordinated innovative projects such as Identity and Difference in Sutton and Linking Communities in Merton. Another creative project was Ancestral Gathering, managed with Aamasade Shepnekhi, which saw her working with communities to create sacred space in the natural environment. She is regularly seen at poetry and music events in Kampala, Uganda. For five years she sat on the board of Laba Street Art Festival, and has assisted in the development of initiatives such as Teen Slam Poetry Challenge, Poetry in Session and the Babashai Poetry Award.

She was one of the Mayor of London Ken Livingstone's London Leaders for Sustainability, where she was exploring environmentalism and creativity with the African Caribbean community in London. She attended Findhorn the Foundation EcoVillages programme, exploring sustainable communities and was a participant in the British Council UK Interaction Leadership Programme for community leaders. With the African Foundation for Development (AFFORD) she worked with petty trader women in Sierra Leone. She is an active African feminist who enjoys exploring Self-Care and Wellbeing with women and girls.

In 2017 she was an artist-in-residence at 32 Degrees East the Ugandan Arts Trust. Her poetry installation entitled To Be or Not 2B? exploring Migration, Identity and Mourning, with a specific focus on the Maafa or Great Disaster -The forced migration and enslavement of Africans. However, this personal ancestry also relates to many of the challenges faced by Africans in the 21st century who are forced to migrate due to conflict, economics or as in her case repatriating to Africa as a means of reconnecting with her African origins and Pan African ideology.

In 2018 Piankhi is a participant in the Great African Caravan, an Art Project exploring peace, migration and a borderless world travelling from Cape Town to Egypt.

== Early childhood and education ==
Piankhi attended Barham and Preston Manor High School and was an exchange student in the US for a year. Inspired by her sister Debbie Nimblette, she started working with youth and is an advocate of informal education and life-long learning. Piankhi attended South Bank University, where she achieved a certificate in Delivering Learning and Learning through Play. Trained by Dr Llaila O Africa, she is a well-being coach and Afrikan Yoga practitioner. An intuitive healer she meditates and has participated in Vipassana, a 10-day silent meditation retreat run by Dharma Dipa.

== Writing ==
Piankhi is a veteran on the spoken-word circuit starting in 1992. Her work can be found in the anthologies One Thousand Voices Rising and Aspects of Life. She has collaborated with Sheron Wray the 'Dance Architect' touring internationally with Texterritory and Jamxchange, both of which explored the interface of improvisation, technology and audience participation. Collaborating with Rocca Gutteridge she created Jump - Lutembe Fantasy Land and with Emily McCartney she documented the work produced as a part of a week-long travelling residency: The East African Soul Train (EAST), which made a journey from Nairobi to Mombasa on the Lunatic Line. Another achievement of that journey was the powerful poem "Punani", which was written by nine female writers who were talking on the theme of Kovu Safarini - My Scar.

Albums to her credit include One Hell of a Storm on Tongue and Groove, Wildcat, BushMeat, fusions of Jazz, Reggae, and Broken Beat. Her work has been featured on the Pan-African poetry platform Badilisha Poetry Radio. SoundCloud, Vimeo and YouTube.

== Published works ==
=== Poems ===
- "Realising", "Tsunami", "Three little birds", in Beverley Nambozo Nsengiyunva, ed. (2014). A Thousand Voices Rising: An anthology of contemporary African poetry. BN Poetry Foundation. ISBN 978-9970-9234-0-3.

=== Discography ===
- One hell of a storm, 1995
