= First Daughter (Brack) =

Painting by John Brack

- Artist: John Brack
- Year: 1955
- Type: oil on canvas on composition board
- Dimensions: 75.5 cm × 55.4 cm (29.7 in × 21.8 in)
- Location: Private collection, Sydney

First Daughter is a 1955 Modernist painting by Australian artist John Brack. The painting depicts his daughter Clara as a young girl kneeling on the floor drawing a person on a piece of paper. The subject is seen from above - from the viewpoint of a father.

The painting was first shown in the exhibition John Brack, at Peter Bray Gallery, Melbourne, 8-17 March 1955, for the price of 35 guineas; then at John Brack: The Sport of Kings and Other Paintings, at the Johnstone Gallery, Brisbane, 27 March - 8 April 1957, titled there Little Girl Drawing, and purchased for 40 guineas, by Mr J.C. Tritton, Brisbane.

It was sold at auction by Christie's in 1971 and "disappeared from view", becoming part of various private collections.

The painting was part of the private collection of Sydney banker, and co-founder of Macquarie Group, David Clarke. It was sold at auction by Sotheby's in April 2015 for a hammer price of AUD725,000.

== See also ==
- Laughing Child, a 1958 portrait by Brack of his daughter Charlotte
