= The price of memory after the tsunami =

2006 poem collection by Mildred Barya

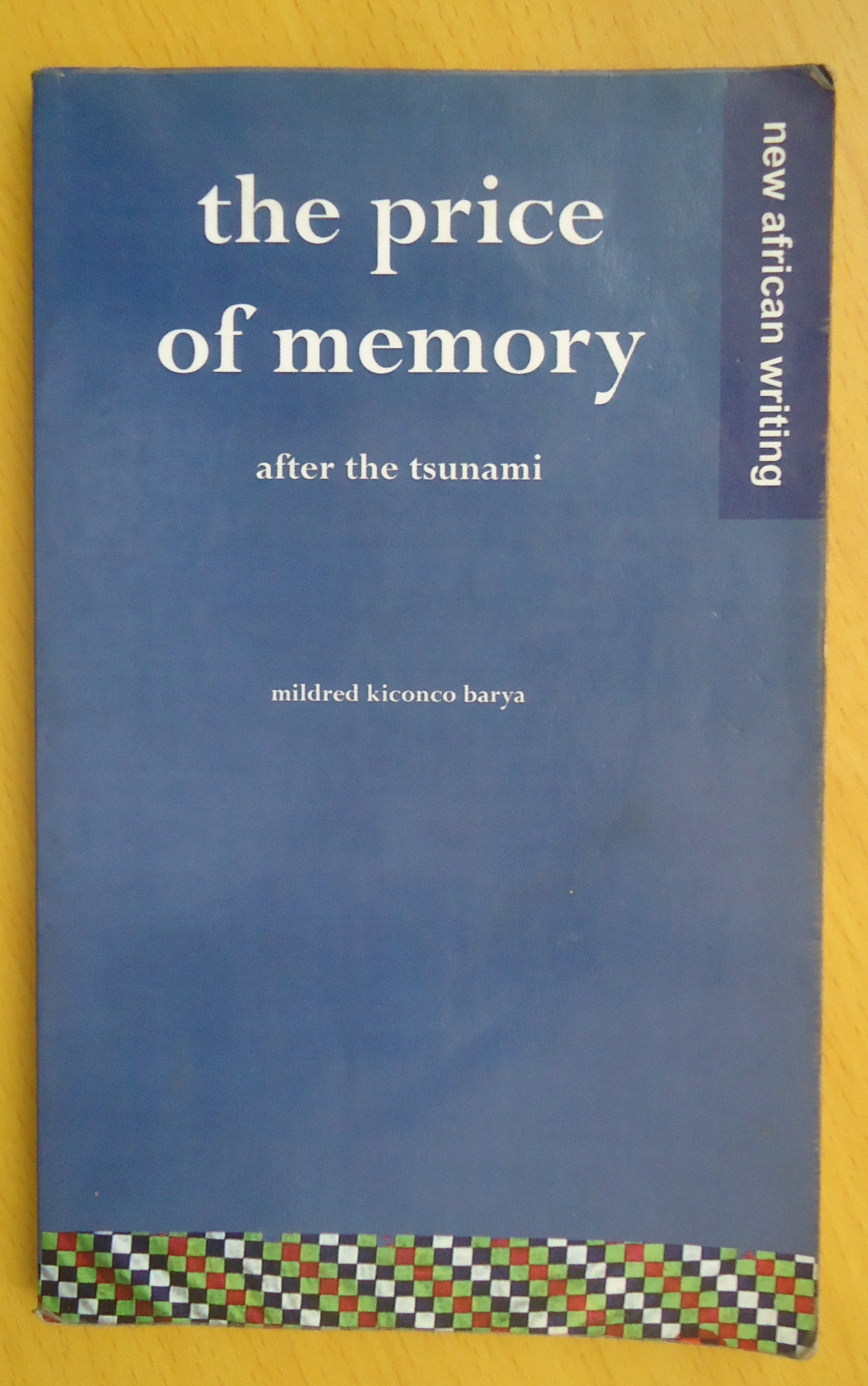
- The price of memory after the tsunami
- Author: Mildred Barya
- Language: English
- Publisher: Mallory Publishing
- Publication date: 2006
- Publication place: Uganda
- Media type: Print (hardback & paperback)
- Pages: 100
- ISBN: 9781856571029
- Preceded by: Men Love Chocolates But They Don't Say
- Followed by: Give Me Room To Move My Feet

The price of memory after the tsunami is a collection of 63 poems by Ugandan author Mildred Barya, published in 2006. The poems are divided into three sections: "Poems of pleasure and pain", "Poems of weakness and strength", and "poems of identity and renunciation".

== Critical reception ==
The Price of Memory: After the Tsunami received favourable critical attention on its publication.

Yusuf Serunkuma Kajura, a reviewer for The Weekly Observer (Uganda) claimed that Barya's "poetry blossoms on indigenous African imagery, rhetorical devices and ideas, easily comparable to Okot p'Bitek's long poem, Song of Lawino." But Barya's poetry "is an enthusiastic trumpet, subtly blown for the woman in society, unlike Lawino's defence of the traditional African values".

Gaaki Kigambo, a reviewer for Uganda's Sunday Monitor, claimed that "Barya's subjects are informed by the things we are used to. In this era of mobile telephony, everyone will identify with Mathematically Proven Love." Kigambo also stated that such poetry "reveals the romanticist in Barya."
