= Andrew Rugasira =

Ugandan businessman and author

- Born: Andrew Rugasira; Kampala, Uganda
- Education: University of London, University of Oxford
- Occupation: Businessman
- Spouse: Alice Sibomana Rugasira
- Writing career
- Notable work: A Good African Story
- Website: goodafrican.com

Andrew Rugasira is a Ugandan businessman and author. He is the author of the book A Good African Story: How a Small Company Built a Global Coffee Brand. In 2003, he founded Good African Coffee, the first African-owned coffee brand to be stocked in UK supermarkets and US retailers. Rugasira was Uganda's chairman of the Eastern African Fine Coffees Association (EAFCA), a member of Uganda's Presidential Investor Roundtable (PIRT) and sits on the board of Maisha Film Lab. Rugasira lives in Kampala and is a father of five children.

== Early life and education ==
Rugasira grew up in Kampala, Uganda. He graduated from the University of London with a degree in Law and Economics, in 1992. He has written numerous papers and articles for newspapers like the Guardian (UK), Financial Times (UK), Telegraph (UK), and New Vision (Uganda). Rugasira is a Fellow of the Royal Society of Arts, London and has spoken there on the theme “Trade not Aid for Africa.” In June 2011, he completed an MSc in African studies at Oxford University, UK.

== Good African Coffee ==
Launched in 2003, Good African Coffee became the first African-owned coffee brand listed in UK supermarkets (Waitrose, Sainsbury's and Tesco). The company works with a supply network of more than 14,000 coffee farmers in western Uganda, where the company has also developed 17 savings and credit coops for those farming communities. In addition to being available in more than 700 UK supermarkets and 500 stores in Africa, Good African Coffee is now available online in the United States.

== Published works ==
- A Good African Story: How a Small Company Built a Global Coffee Brand. Random House UK. 2013. ISBN 978-1847922076.
