= Songs of Paradise: A Harvest of Poetry and Verse =

2009 book by James Munange Ogoola

Songs of paradise: a harvest of poetry and verse
- Author: James Munange Ogoola
- Language: English
- Published: 2009 Word Alive Publishers
- Publication place: Uganda
- Media type: Print (hardback & paperback)
- Pages: 166
- ISBN: 9789966805423

Songs of Paradise: A Harvest of Poetry and Verse is a 2009 collection of 52 poems by Ugandan poet James Munange Ogoola.

The poems are arranged in seven sections: "Spiritual", "Love and life", "Mortality and immortality", "Poetry, song and the word", "Environment and nature", "Justice and governance", and "Tribute and Dedications".

== Literary criticism ==
The book received both positive and negative reviews from critics. It was received positively in Ugandan newspapers The Observer, New Vision and the Daily Monitor. It received a negative review from The Independent.

Martyn Drakard of The Observer called it "a jewel, and one to read once and again and enjoy more each time".

But Gaaki Kigambo of The Independent had a negative review for it. He wrote "It seems in all likelihood that following the wild reception of "Rape of the Templeâ", the principal judge must have come under pressure, personal or friendly, to beat back being seen as some sort of poetic one hit wonder and reached in his recesses to see what he could crank out. Or a lucrative publishing deal came knocking." He added "It is not to say Ogoola can't write poetry, or any literary work for that matter, and so should steer clear of the field. Rather, with his unabashed enthusiasm, his editor and publishers need to be a little more honest and frank with him. That way, out of the man of the law can surely emerge a poetic jurist, par excellence. There's so much to work with in James Ogoola".

== Sales ==
The book was a major success in 2009. It got the Ugandan community interested in books authored by Ugandans.
