= Christopher Henry Muwanga Barlow =

Ugandan poet

- Born: Christopher Henry Muwanga Barlow; 1 May 1929
- Died: 20 August 2006 (aged 77)
- Occupations: Civil servant, poet
- Writing career
- Period: 1929–2006
- Genre: poetry
- Notable works: Building the Nation and Other Poems

Christopher Henry Muwanga Barlow (1 May 1929 – 20 August 2006) was a Ugandan poet, notable for his poem "Building the Nation". He was one of the recipients of the Uganda Golden Jubilee medals in 2013.

== Early childhood and education ==
Born on 1 May 1929, to John and Maliza Barlow, Henry Barlow attended King's College Budo (1936–1948), where he excelled in cricket and lawn tennis. It was at Budo that Barlow discovered poetry. He joined Makerere University College (1949–1953), graduating with a BA degree (London). He was among the 13 pioneer graduates to be awarded degrees. Before, the university used to award only diplomas. He later did a diploma in Agricultural Economics at Balliol College, Oxford University (1959–1960).

== Civil Service ==
Starting out as a co-operative officer in 1954, Barlow rapidly rose through the civil service ranks to become permanent secretary in 1963, a year after independence. After working in several government ministries, he was seconded to the Lint Marketing Board as chairman and managing director. That was in January 1971, the same month Idi Amin took over power. In 1976 Barlow resigned from the civil service and eventually moved to Addis Ababa, Ethiopia, to become secretary general of the African Association for Public Administration and Management. He returned to Uganda in 1981, to rejoin the civil service as permanent secretary in the president's office and head of the civil service. Barlow retired from the Civil Service in 1987. After his retirement, he served as a member of the Zimbabwe Public Service Review Commission (1987–1989). He also kept busy doing consultancy and charitable work, while at the same time pursuing his life passion, poetry. In spite of his achievements, both as a public administrator and a writer, Barlow maintained a low profile, especially after retiring from civil service. He kept out of politics, apart from 1994, when he stood for Constituent Assembly in Makindye East.

== Writing ==
Although he started writing in the mid-1940s, while a student at Budo, his collection of poems, Building the Nation and Other Poems, was first published in 2000, almost 55 years later. But even before they were published as a collection, Barlow's poems, especially "Building the Nation", were already popular with poetry lovers both in Uganda and abroad and they regularly appeared in literature journals and text books. Fourteen of his poems had earlier been published under the title Of Feathers and Dead Leaves in 1989.

== Published works ==
=== Poetry collections ===
- Of Feathers and Dead Leaves and Other Poems, Harare: Sapes Trust, 1989. ISBN 978-0797408920
- Building the Nation and Other Poems, Kampala: Fountain Publishers, 2000. ISBN 9970021915

=== Anthologies ===
- "My Newest Bride", "Errand to Sibemalizibwa as the news", and "Argument with God", in David Cook, ed. (1976). In Black and White. Nairobi: East African Literature Bureau.
- "The Uninterrupted Dream", "Building the Nation", in ZUKA – A Journal of East African Creative Writings. Nairobi: Oxford University Press. October 1970.
- "Building the Nation", "The death of an eland", "I refuse to take your brotherly hand", "The Village well", in David Cook and David Rubadiri, ed. (1971). Poems from East Africa. Heinemann Educational Books: London.
- "Building the Nation", in Jonathan Kariara and Ellen Kitonga, ed. (1976). An Introduction to East African Poetry. London: Oxford University Press.
- "Building the Nation", in David Rubadiri, ed. (1989). Growing up with Poetry. Nairobi: Heinemann.
- "Uganda from Oxford", "The Flight", "Building the Nation", in Okot Benge and Alex Bangirana, ed. (2000). Uganda Poetry Anthology 2000. Kampala: Fountain.
