= Timothy Wangusa =

- Born: 1942 (age 83–84); Bugisu
- Citizenship: Ugandan
- Education: university of Leeds, Makerere University, King's College Budo, Nabumali High School
- Occupation: Poet

Timothy Wangusa

Timothy Wangusa (born 1942) is a Ugandan poet and novelist. Wangusa was chairman of Uganda Writers Association and founder president of International PEN Uganda Centre.

== Early life and education ==
Wangusa is an ethnic Mumasaaba, born in Bugisu, in eastern Uganda. He attended Nabumali High School from 1958 to 1961 before transferring to King's College Budo, where he completed his Advanced Level education between 1962 and 1963. He subsequently studied English at Makerere University and the University of Leeds (UK). He wrote his MA and PhD on British and African poetry, respectively.

Wangusa started working at Makerere University in 1969. He was appointed as Professor in 1981 (the first from Bugisu). In his acceptance speech 'A Wordless World,' he looked at how words were starting to lose meaning and there was a continuous shift from words and speech. Later Wangusa served as the Head of Department of Literature and Dean of Faculty of Arts. He was also a Minister of Education in the Ugandan Government (1985–86) and a Member of Parliament (1989–96). Presently, he serves as a Senior Presidential Advisor In Museveni's government. Wangusa played a pivotal role in establishing the Department of Languages and Literature at Uganda Christian University, an Anglican University in Mukono.

== Writing ==
His collection of poems Salutations: Poems 1965-1975 (1977), reissued with additional poems as A Pattern of Dust: Selected Poems 1965-1990 (1994), reflects his rural origins. The novel Upon This Mountain (1989) tells the story of Mwambu, who is determined to touch heaven, and describes his journey towards adulthood. The novel combines African folklore and proverbs with Christian symbolism. Its main theme is that of growing up in the Ugandan society and what challenges come with growing up in the traditional setting. Wangusa's work has been featured on the pan-African poetry platform Badilisha Poetry Radio.

== Publications ==
- Salutations: Poems 1965-1975 (1977)
- Upon this mountain (1989)
- A Pattern of Dust: Selected Poems 1965-1990 (1994)
- Anthem for Africa (1995)
- Africa's New Brood (2006)
- "A taxi driver on his death

== See also ==
- John Ruganda
- David Rubadiri
- Ngugi wa Thiong'o
- Wole Soyinka
- Okot p'Bitek
