= MK Publishers =

Ugandan publishing company

- Status: Active
- Founded: 1995
- Country of origin: Uganda
- Official website: www.mkpublishers.com

MK Publishers is a publisher in Uganda publishing mainly educational books. It largely publishes course books for primary and secondary schools.

== History ==
MK publishers was incorporated in 1995 The Founding CEO is Late Musoke Majwega. The goal was to publish affordable cost educational books and other scholastic materials. Today MK Publishers has published books for most of the primary and secondary school curriculum subjects for Uganda, Rwanda, Kenya, Burundi, Ethiopia and Cameroon.

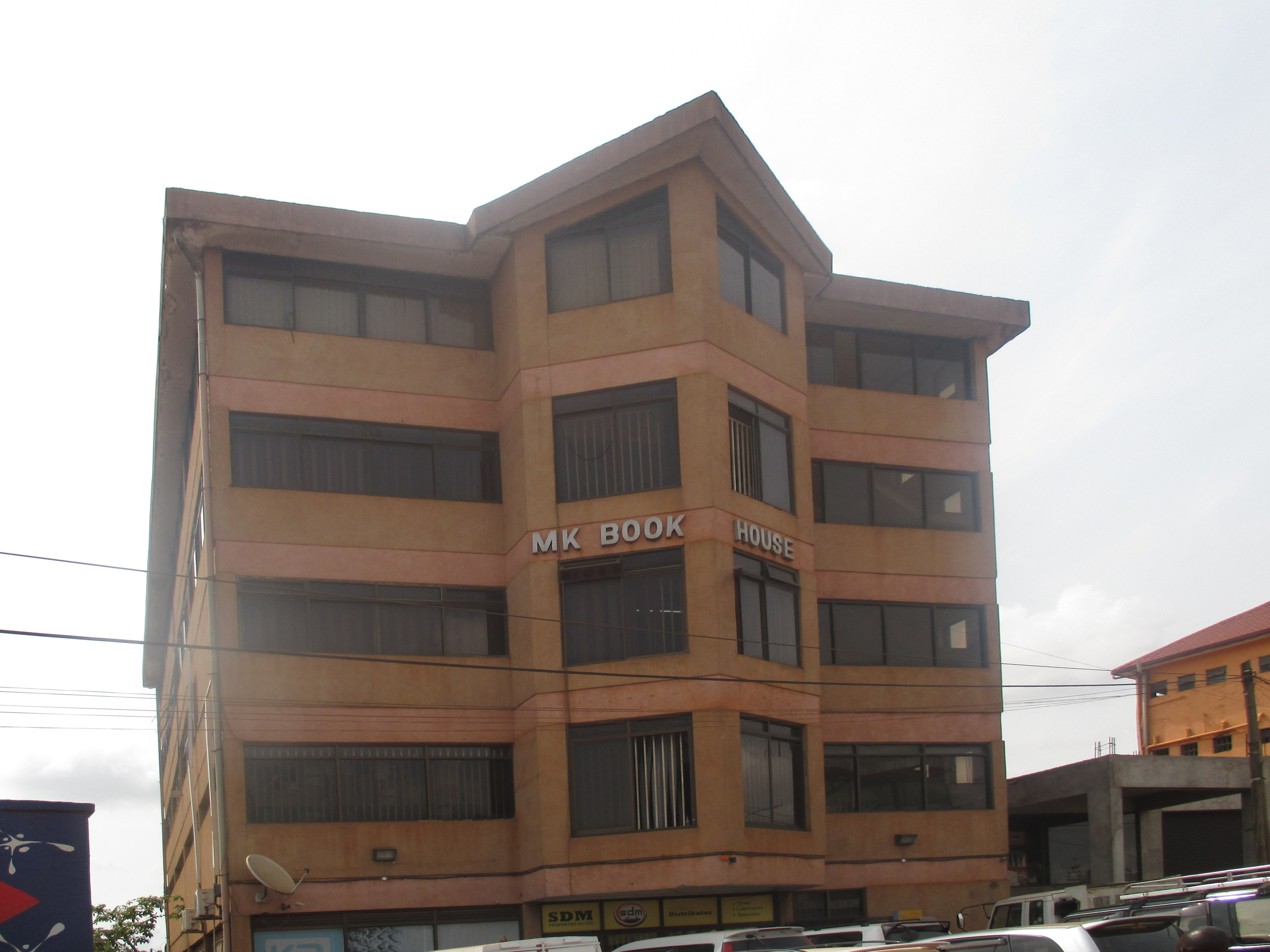
MK book house

== Publications ==
- Wings That Got Me Soaring
- Golden Memories of a Village Belle
- Dynamics of Success & Achievement
- MK Fundamentals of Economics by Herbert Mutamba Asiimwe
- MK Dictionary of Economicsby Herbert Mutamba Asiimwe

== Notable authors ==
- Badiru Malimbo Kigundu
- Barbara Itungo Kyagulanyi
- Livingstone Ssebunya
- Herbert Asiimwe Mutamba
