= Richard Carl Ntiru =

Ugandan poet and editor (born 1946)

- Born: 1946 (age 79–80); Kigezi District, Uganda
- Occupation: writer
- Writing career
- Genre: Poetry
- Notable work: Tensions

Richard Carl Ntiru (born 1946) is a Ugandan poet and editor. His only collection of poetry is Tensions (1971), which is rich in imagery reminiscent of the poetry of Christopher Okigbo and Paul Ndu. Ntiru deals with issues of contemporary East Africa and while he acknowledges other poets in other literatures, he consciously explores the divisions within human society and critiques his society's attitudes towards the unfortunate. Apart from poetry he has also written a radio play and short stories, and his poems "If it is true", and "The miniskirt" are included in The Penguin Book of Modern African Poetry (1999).

== Early life and education ==
Richard Ntiru was born near Kisoro in Kigezi District, in south-western Uganda. He was educated at Ntare School in Mbarara. In 1968, he joined Makerere University college where he studied English and edited the university magazine, The Makererean, as well as the campus journal of creative writing, Pen point. He also managed the Makerere travelling theatre. For many years, Ntiru worked as an editor with publishing companies and research organisations in East Africa, including the now defunct East African Publishing House.

== Published works ==
=== Poetry collection ===
- Tensions. Nairobi: East African Publishing House. 1971.

=== Poems ===
- "The miniskirt" and "If it is true", in Gerald Moore, Ulli Beier, ed. (1998). The Penguin Book of Modern African Poetry. Penguin Books. ISBN 9780141181004.
- "Modena", "The pauper", "To the living" and "Virgine Madre", in David Cook, David Rubadiri, ed. (1996). Poems from East Africa. East African Publishers. ISBN 9789966460196.
- "First rains", in Zuka 1–4 (Oxford University Press) 1967.
- "Introduction"
