= The Lantern Meet of Poets =

The Lantern Meet of Poets is a community of writers and thinkers in Uganda who express their creativity through the writing, performing and reciting of poetry. They contribute a great deal of their time and resources towards the development of poetry among the youth in secondary schools.

== Origin ==
The Lantern Meet of Poets started as a group of old school friends from Namilyango College who came together at the university with a passion for literature, which they turned into a poetry club. Together with friends from Mount Saint Mary's College Namagunga, they elected to spend time together in a university dome room sharing poetry for the love of it.

== Odyssey ==
Raymond Ojakol, Collins Assiimwe, Guy Mambo and Alal B. Sophia formed the Lantern Meet of Poets in Africa Hall, a residential girls' hall at Makerere University in 2007, with the idea that as a cultural group they were entitled to access to the national cultural institution (National Theatre). The first meet moved from the university residential hall to the national theater. The early meets were open to invited members only and the participants were asked and expected to introduce new members.

They eventually decided to open the meet to non-invited guests and the first recital, organized by Kunihira Rachel, had no title. With memorized poems they fused music, drama and poetry in this recital. They have held several recitals since then:

- Tells by the Camp fire’ first poetry production in the main theater auditorium, supported by Okurut Romanio, which was a turning point in the attendance of poetry meets.
- Fresh court of paint
- Foot prints of verse. An Odyssey
- Words heartbeats and Neon lights
- Odyssey of verse
- Broken voices of the revolution
- Bitter Sweet
- The Awakening
- Lantern Meet and Friends
- Waltz of words

== Philosophical transition ==
- Comradeship

Coming together to enjoy each other's passion in poetry manifested itself in free productions and gifts for the audience. The idea is that everyone comes to the Lantern Meet to give through service and as the ultimate form of honor.

- Anonymity

Established a tradition of fairness and impartiality in critiquing which lead to the establishment of the tradition of honesty. The incidental tradition of the walk back to the university campus, affectionately called ‘the walk’, was used as an opportunity to heal possible offences.

- Purposefulness

The opening of the meet introduced more people who had a deep passion for literature and had also studied it in their secondary school years. Their introduction into the community brought a new wave of thought, a deeper conviction in the quality of poetry, and the desire to have more literary poetry.

- Restorative

Starting with the ‘Broken voices of the revolution’ production, the Lantern Meet introduced a deliberate discussion which would lead to the harmonization of thought on what the Lantern Meet of Poets wants to transmit to the audience. This process led to a concretization of thought.

== School projects ==
Starting in 2009, the Lantern Meet of Poets visit schools to develop literary arts, especially poetry. The process entails forming writers or poetry clubs, encouraging the students to meet regularly (weekly), writing new poetry, preparing for recitals, self-organization, working with the Lantern Meet of Poets and other schools; e.g. Nabisunsa Girls Secondary School, Gayaza High School, Turkish Light Academy, Kings College Budo, and St. Mary's College Kisubi.

== Meets, recitals and poetry productions ==
- Meet: “the meet” is the informal name given to the biweekly activity, carried out by the Lantern Meet. Its full form is ‘The Lantern Meet Sunday Poetry Meeting’. It includes sitting in a circle, and submitting, reading, and critiquing poems.
- Recitals (audience-specific)
- Poetry Productions (more than just poetry)
