= Fountain Publishers =

Ugandan publishing house

- Status: Active
- Founded: 1988 (37 years ago)
- Founder: James R Tumusiime
- Country of origin: Uganda
- Headquarters location: Kampala
- Official website: www.fountainpublishers.co.ug

Fountain Publishers is a publishing company in Uganda and Rwanda. Fountain is a publisher of educational material, literary material and maps.

== History ==
Fountain Publishers was started in 1988 by James R Tumusiime and his wife. Its first offices were on top of the former City Bar. Fountain employed only four individuals, with just a typewriter and four desks. Their maiden publication was Who is Who in Uganda, a miniature directory of politicians, religious men and academicians. Their second publication was Uganda 30 Years (1992), a thirty-year-old nation birthday book.

== Notable authors ==
- Gilbert Bukenya
- Mary Karooro Okurut
- Goretti Kyomuhendo
- Mahmood Mamdani
- Janet Museveni
- Christopher Henry Muwanga Barlow
- Michael B. Nsimbi
- Julius Ocwinyo
- Charles Onyango-Obbo
- Taban Lo Liyong
- Lillian Tindyebwa
- Timothy Wangusa

== Book series ==
- Fountain Series in Education Studies
- Fountain Series in Gender Studies
- Fountain Series in Law and Business Studies
- Kituo cha Katiba (Swahili, "Constitution Centre") Occasional Publication (series)
- Our Heritage Series
- Tales from the Past

== See also ==
- List of companies based in Uganda
