= John Ruganda =

Ugandan playwright and professor (1941-2007)

John Ruganda (30 May 1941 to 8 December 2007) was Uganda's best known playwright. He was born in Fort Portal and died in Uganda's capital Kampala.The cause of death was cancer of the throat.

== Education ==
He was a student at Makerere University college, and studied English.

== Career ==
John Ruganda worked as a professor of Literature at Makerere university. As a playwright and director, he was one of the members who founded the Makerere travelling theatre.

In the early 1970s, he left an insecure political climate in Uganda for Kenya and started work with the Oxford University press as an editor, and later joined University of Nairobi as a lecturer. While here, he also worked with this university's travelling theatre. Ruganda was also a professor at University of North, South Africa.

His plays have been compulsory texts as part of the Literature in English subject in the Uganda syllabus for both Ordinary and Advanced level. Notable among these are The Burdens (1972), Black Mamba (1973) and The Floods (1980).

Ruganda's plays "reflect the reality of the East African sociopolitical situation after independence." He was considered a shaping force of East African theater.

== Bibliography ==
=== Plays ===
- The Burdens, Kampala, Uganda, National Theatre, January 1970
- Black Mamba, Kampala, 1972
- The Good Woman of Setzuan, by Bertolt Brecht, translated into Swahili by Ruganda, Nairobi, Nairobi University Players, November 1978
- The Floods, Nairobi, French Cultural Centre, 1 March 1979
- Music without Tears, Nairobi, Nairobi University Players, February 1982
- Echoes of Silence, Nairobi, 1985
- Shreds of Tenderness

=== Television ===
- The Secret of the Season, screenplay by Ruganda, Voice of Kenya, March 1973
- The Floods, screenplay by Ruganda, Voice of Kenya, April 1973
- The Illegitimate, screenplay by Ruganda, Voice of Kenya, August 1982
