= James Munange Ogoola =

Ugandan lawyer and judge

- Born: James Munange Ogoola; 15 August 1945 (age 81); Lumino, Busia, Uganda
- Education: University of Dar es Salaam (Bachelor of Laws); Law Development Centre (Diploma in Legal Practice); Columbia University (Master of Laws)
- Occupations: Judge & Author
- Spouse: Mrs. Ogoola
- Writing career
- Genre: Poetry
- Notable works: Song of Paradise: A Harvest of Poetry and Verse

Justice James Ogoola (sometimes referred to as James Munange Ogoola) is the former Principal Judge of the High Court of Uganda and a Justice of the COMESA Court of Justice in Lusaka, Zambia. He is the also the former chairperson of the Judicial Service Commission of Uganda. Previously, he served as the chairman of the commission of inquiry into the mismanagement of The Global Fund to Fight AIDS, Tuberculosis and Malaria. He was an Acting Justice of the Supreme Court of Uganda. He is a member of The East African Court of Justice.

== Early life and education ==
Justice Ogoola was born an only child to Mr. and Mrs Yukana Madangu on 15 August 1945 at Lumino, Busia in the then Bukedi district (currently Samia-Bugwe county in Busia District). His mother, Norah Akuku, Nataboona from the Bataboona clan, died when he was five and he was thus raised by relatives He attended Nabumali High School for his O-Level studies and Kings College Budo for his A-Level education. He studied law at the University of Dar-es-Salaam, from 1966 until 1969, graduating with the degree of Bachelor of Laws. His degree of Master of Laws, was obtained from Columbia University in 1974. He also holds the Diploma in Legal Practice from the Law Development Centre in Kampala, obtained in 1997.

== Law ==
Beginning in 1969, James Ogoola has worked in different capacities, including the following:

- As a state attorney (legislative drafting), then senior parliamentary draftsman, then principal state attorney (Drafting), in the Department of First Parliamentary Counsel, at the Uganda Justice Ministry and the Chambers of the Attorney General, from 1969 until 1974.
- As a legal officer in the Privy Council Office, at the Federal Department of Justice, Ottawa, Canada
- He was the first African to be appointed legal adviser at the International Monetary Fund (IMF) in 1974. He was responsible for Latin American country operations between 1974 and 1978 at IMF headquarters, Washington DC, USA.
- As a legal officer at the IMF office in Paris, France, from 1978 until 1980.
- As the legal officer responsible for African & Middle East country operations at the IMF headquarters, in Washington, DC, from 1981 until 1988 and from 1991 until 1997.
- Retired from the IMF after 23 years of service.
- As deputy director of the Legal Department at the headquarters of the African Development Bank (AfDB), in Abidjan, Ivory Coast, from 1988 until 1991.
- Concurrently designated as Deputy General Counsel and Deputy Secretary General at AfDB.
- Served as the Chairman of the AfDB Staff Disciplinary Committee, from 1989 until 1990.
- Was an adjunct professor at the American University School of Law, in Washington, D.C., from 1996 until 1997. Taught a course on International Commercial Transactions and Banking Law to the Master of Laws class.
- Member, Chief Justice's technical committee on the establishment of the Commercial Court of Uganda from 1996 until 1997.
- Obtained certification to the Courts of Judicature, Uganda in 1997.
- Member of the tribunal investigating abuse of office by Iganga District chairman in 1999.
- Head of Commercial Court of Uganda from 1999 until 2004.
- Chairman, Judicial Commission of Inquiry on Banking, January 2000 to October 2000.
- Member of the tribunal investigating abuse of office by Sembabule District chairman in 2000.
- Member of the judicial panel on National Referendum 2000.
- Appointed Principal Judge, High Court of Uganda, on 30 July 2004, replacing Justice Herbert Ntabagoba.
- Member, judges administrative advisory committee, which advises the Chief Justice of Uganda on the administration of the Judiciary.
- Represented the Judiciary at the Tripartite Conference of the Judiciaries of East African countries.
- Represented the East African judiciaries at the ministerial negotiations and drafting sessions of the proposed East African Treaty, with particular emphasis on the establishment of the East African Court of Justice.
- In 2022 appointed chairperson of the Judicial Reform Committee of South Sudan.

== Writing ==
Ogoola leisure time is taken up almost entirely by matters of personal faith. He has just completed a draft translation of the New Testament Bible into his mother tongue, Lusamia.

In 2009, Ogoola's first collection of poems, Songs of Paradise: A Harvest of Poetry and Verse, was published, to favourable critical acclaim. One reviewer called it a "landmark for the industry". For the first time in more than 30 years, the media showed a lot of interest in the book. The Observer called it "a jewel, and one to read once and again and enjoy more each time". The Independent called it "one heck of a piece of writing" but wondered why there was nothing before 2005. On its largely Christian themes, he said: "Ogoola has attempted to paraphrase biblical passages in a text that is every inch prose but chopped and arranged as to appear as poetry".

== Personal life ==
Justice Ogoola is married to Florence Wandera and they have 5 adult children between them.

== Published works ==
- Songs of Paradise: A Harvest of Poetry and Verse. Word alive publishers. 2009. ISBN 978-9966-805-42-3.

== See also ==
- Busia Municipality
- Supreme Court of Uganda
- Eastern Region, Uganda
