= Julius Ocwinyo =

Ugandan editor, poet and novelist

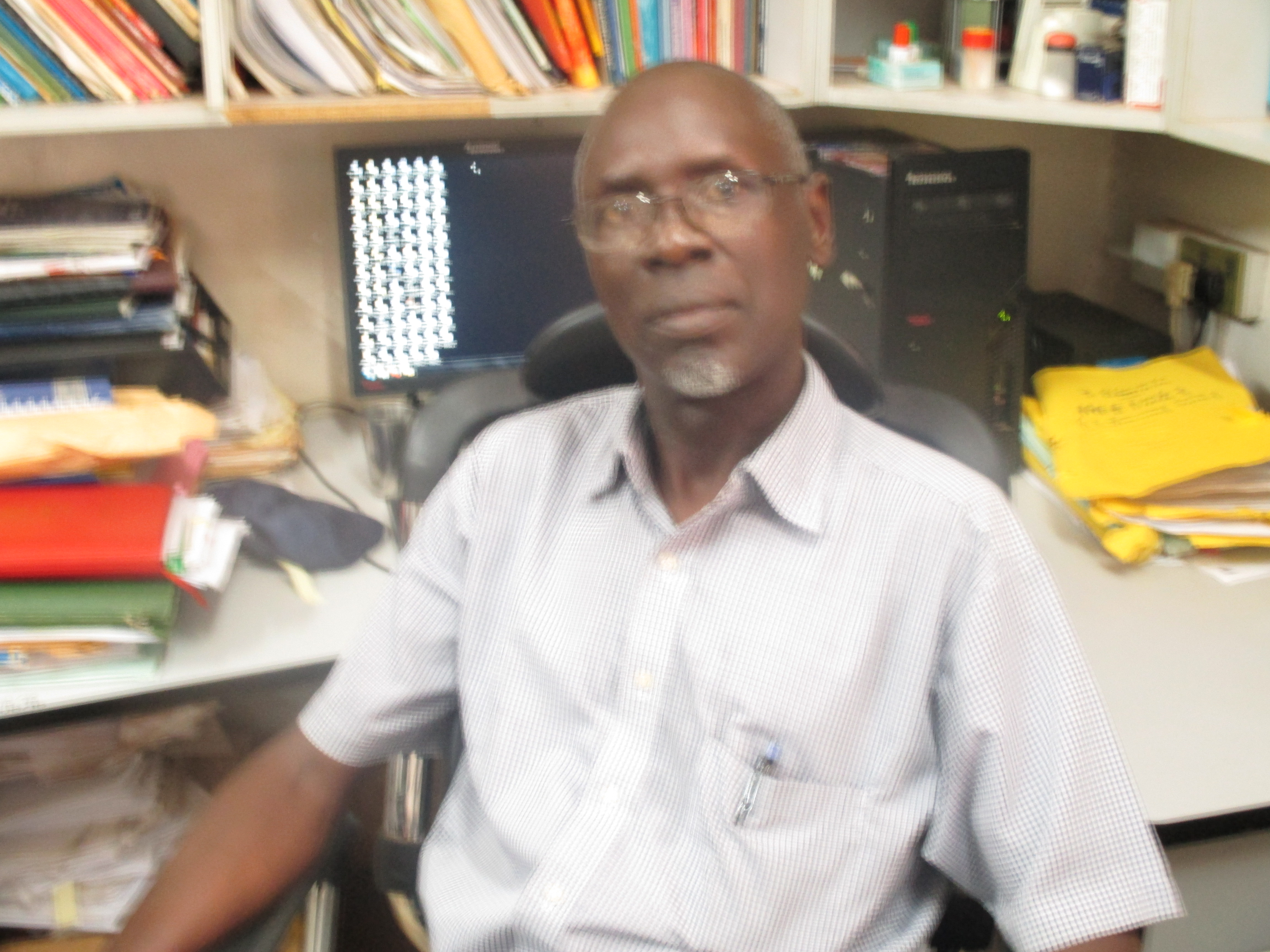
- Born: Julius Ocwinyo; 1961 (age 64–65); Apac District, Uganda
- Occupations: writer, Editor
- Writing career
- Notable works: Fate of the Banished, The Unfulfilled Dream, Footprints of the Outsider

Julius Ocwinyo (born 1961) is a Ugandan editor, poet and novelist. His novels include Fate of the Banished, The Unfulfilled Dream (2002)and Footprints of the Outsider. His work has appeared in several newspapers including The New York Times.

== Early life and education ==
Ocwinyo was born in Teboke village in Apac District. His father worked in the Uganda Prisons Service and his mother was a housewife. Before joining the Prisons Service his father had served in the King’s African Rifles and had been deployed to Misr (Egypt) towards the end of World War II. Ocwinyo studied at Aboke Junior Seminary and Lango College, before joining the Institute of Teacher Education at Kyambogo, where he earned a Diploma in Education. He later studied at Makerere University, where he received a Bachelor of Education. Ocwinyo taught at various educational institutions before becoming an editor for Fountain Publishers, Kampala.

== Writing ==
Some of his works have been recognized nationally. Fate of the Banished won the 1997 Uganda Publishers and Booksellers Association (UPABA) award for best adult fiction. In 2004, Footprints of the Outsider won the Kinyara Award for best adult fiction (sponsored by the British Council). Fate of the Banished, was selected as one of the study texts for the A-level Literature syllabus. His poetry has been published in 'Uganda Poetry Anthology 2000'.

== Published works ==
- Fate of the Banished. Fountain Publishers. 1997. ISBN 9789970021017.
- Footprints of the Outsider. Fountain Publishers. 2002. ISBN 9789970023431.
- The Unfulfilled Dream. Fountain Publishers. 2002. ISBN 978-9970023813.
- The Price of Grandma's Love. Fountain Publishers. 2009. ISBN 9789970027026.
