= Lakotokoto =

Lakotokoto is a local traditional dish of the Acholi people in Northern Uganda made from ground raw simsim. The food is prepared with a combination of ingredients like onions, tomatoes, and protein such as dry fish, beef, or offal. The preparation of Lakotokoto involves washing, grinding, and pressing the simsim to separate the oil, though some cooks retain the oil to avoid bitterness. The dish is served with millet dough (kwon kal or kalo), cassava flour dough or sweet potatoes.

The name Lakotokoto came about as a result of the sound the food makes while being cooked on fire.

== See also ==
- Sombe
- Eshabwe
- Malewa
