= Dek Agira =

- Region or state: Northern Region, Uganda
- Main ingredients: Pigeon peas; Shea butter oil

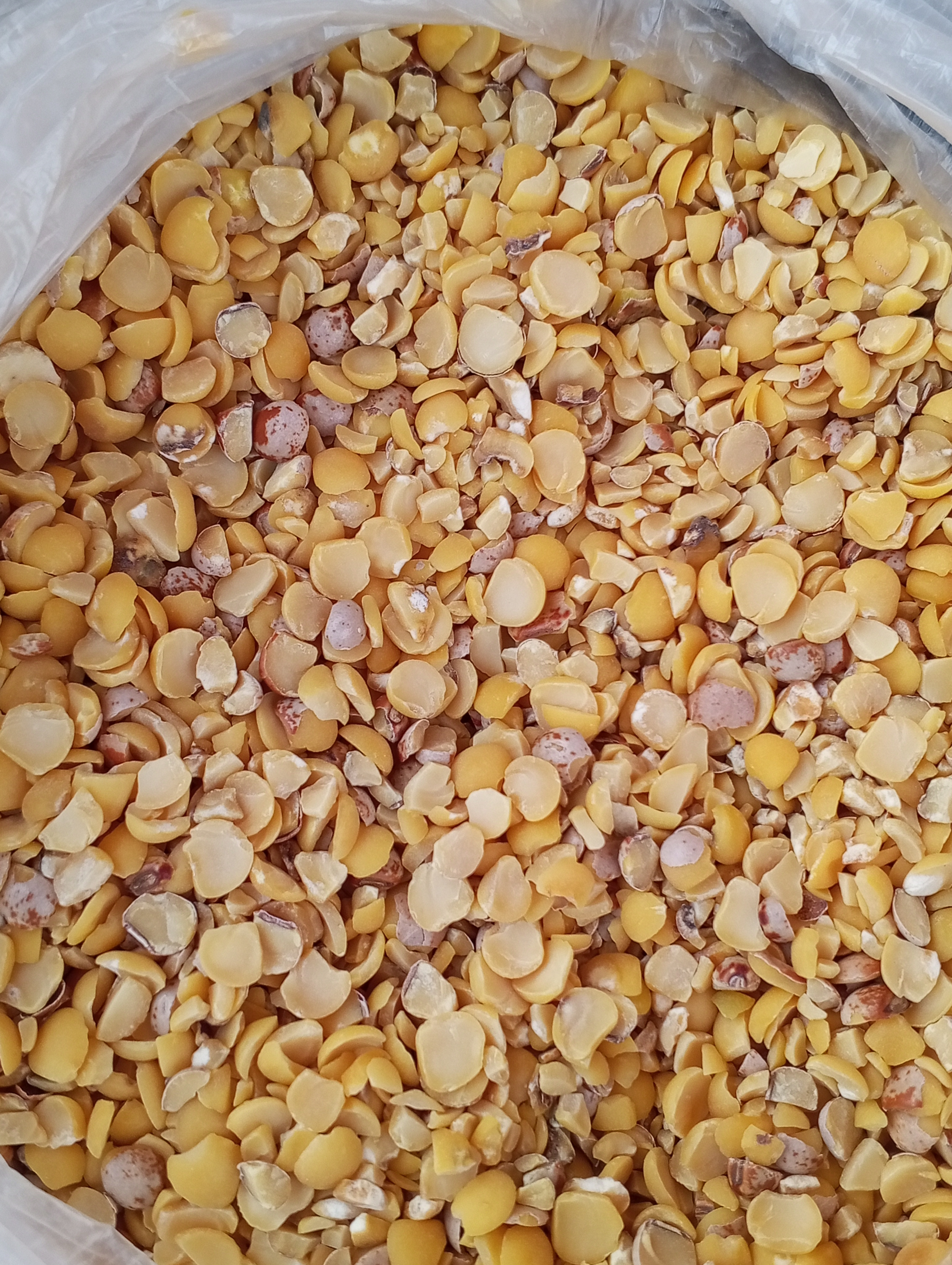
Pigeon peas

Dek Agira is a traditional Lango dish from Northern Uganda. It is made by mashing pigeon peas (or beans) until smooth and creamy. The food is served with shea butter oil and eaten together with "Kwon Kal" made from millet flour. Traditionally, it is used to anoint traditional leaders in the clans of Lango community and parts of Acholi in Northern Uganda.

Dek Agira is also served during traditional weddings. It is served with peanut butter.

== See also ==
- Sombe
- Malewa
- Eshabwe
