= Firinda =

Ugandan cuisine made from peeled mashed beans

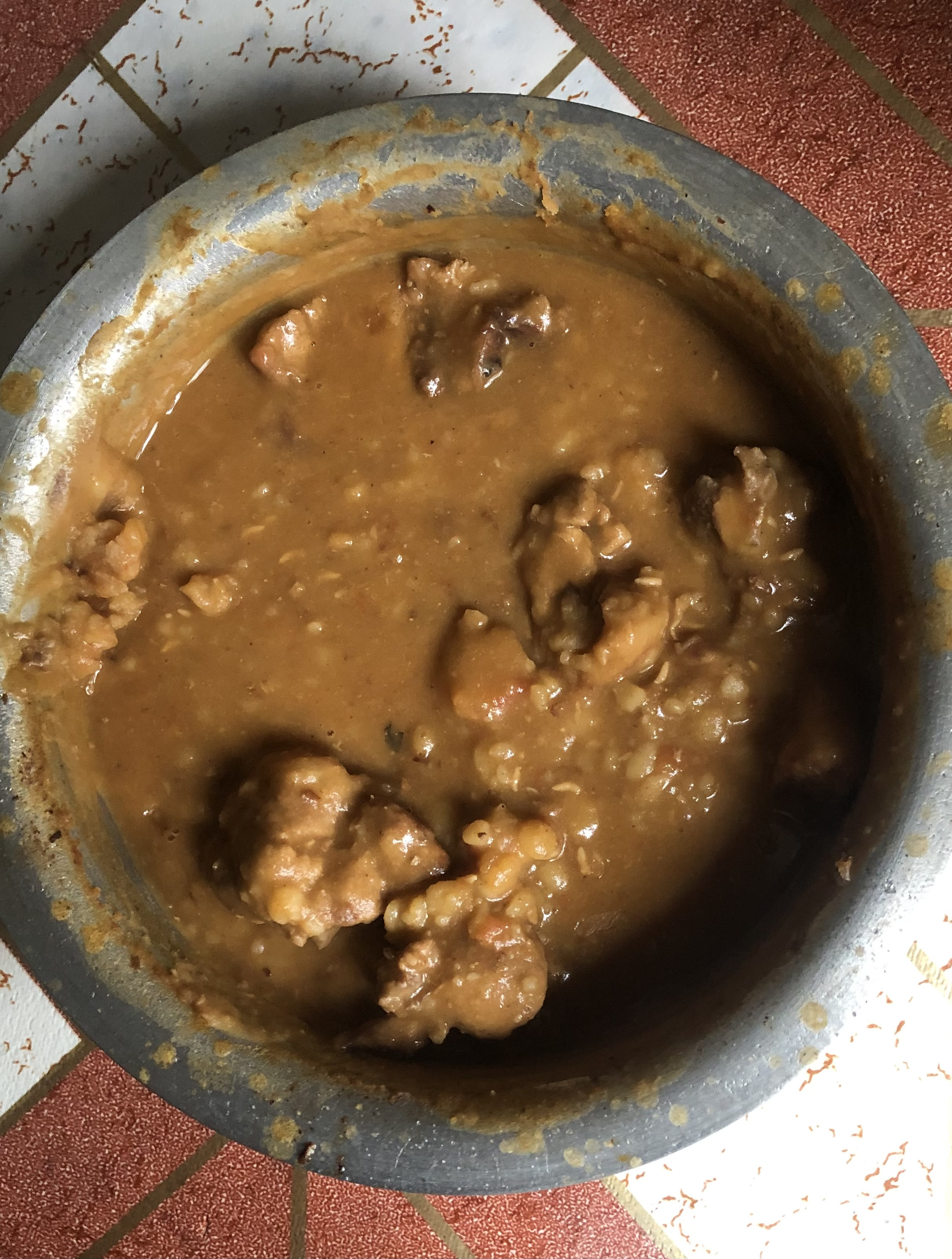
- Firinda sauce in a sauce pan
- Type: sauce
- Course: Main course
- Place of origin: Western Uganda
- Region or state: East Africa
- Cooking time
- Main ingredients: Dry beans, Ghee or Cooking oil, Table salt, Onions, Tomatoes
- Ingredients generally used: Fish or any type of meat, Garden eggs, Egg plants, Ginger powder, Garlic, Soda Ash liquid, Ebisunsa (pumpkin leaves), Mush rooms, Yam leaves
- Variations: Fish or any type of meat can be added to the Firinda sauce

Firinda is a Ugandan sauce, made from uncoated mashed beans that originates from Western Uganda among the Batooro, Banyoro and Bakonzo. It is also known as Madakwa by the Congolese. It is a sauce that symbolises hospitality, served at different occasions including traditional marriage ceremonies, restaurants and cultural rituals.

== Ingredients ==
=== Major ingredients ===
- Dry beans
- Ghee or Cooking oil
- Table salt
- Onions
- Tomatoes

=== Optional ingredients ===
- Fish or any type of meat
- Garden eggs
- Eggplant
- Ginger powder
- Garlic
- Soda Ash liquid (To make the beans cook faster)
- Ebisunsa (pumpkin leaves)
- Mushrooms
- Yam leaves

== Preparation of Firinda ==
=== Soaking of the dry beans ===
Ebihimba (dry beans) are first soaked in cold water overnight before the day of preparation or soaking them in hot water for at least two hours or they are half boiled so that beans coats/covers are softened. The bean coats are then peeled off from the bean seeds to leave only the cotyledons, a process known as "Kutoondoora Ebihimba".

=== Boiling of the uncoated beans ===
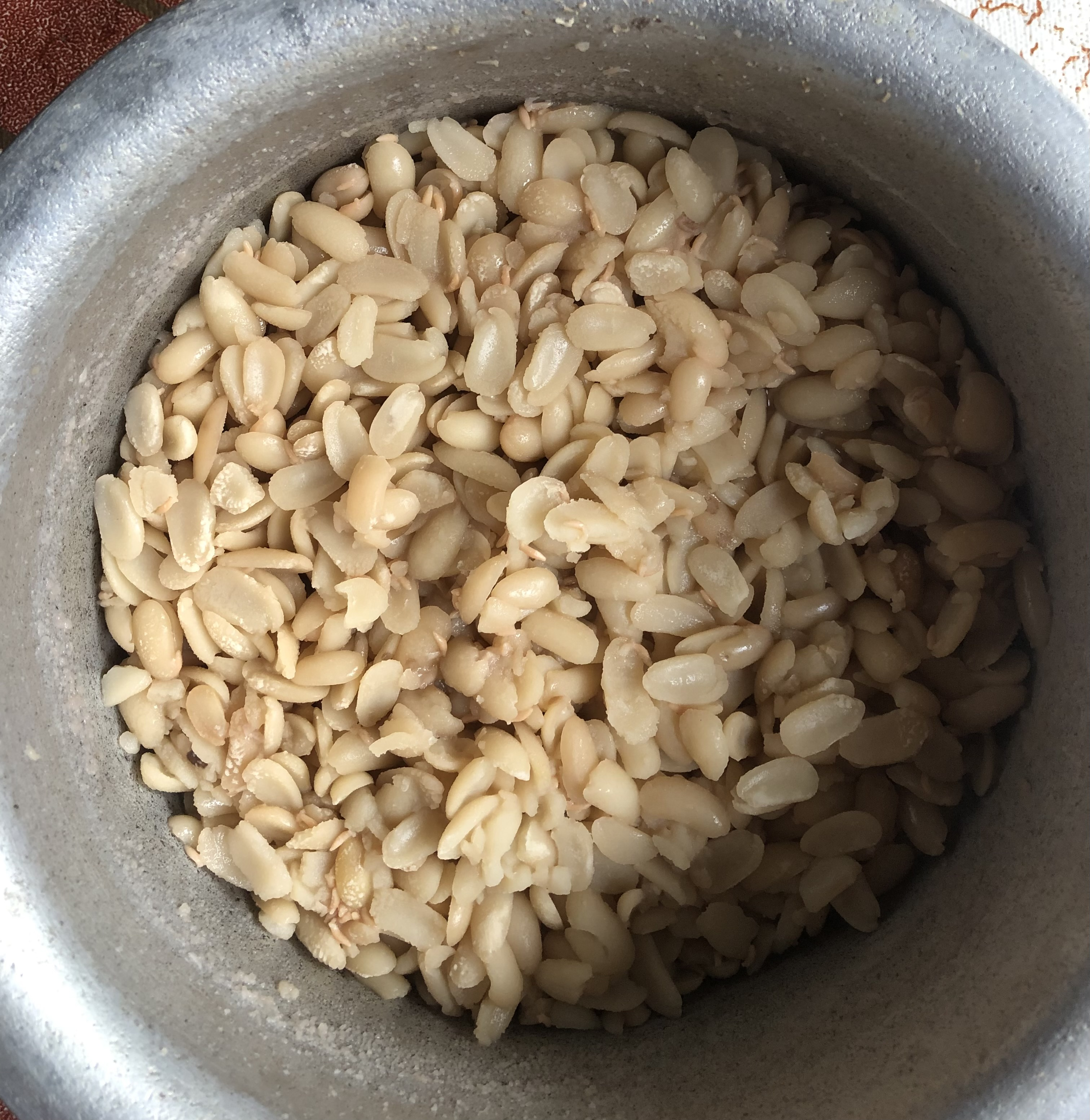
Boiled uncoated beans that will be used to prepare Firinda

The uncoated beans are re-boiled until they are ready and their the water is drained. The drained water is kept to be later used instead of adding water. Egg plants can be boiled together with the uncoated beans but it is optional. if the egg plants are used, they should be removed when they are ready before mashing the cooked uncoated beans. The ready uncoated beans are the mashed either using a blender or masher. The mashed beans can either be fried using cooking oil or ghee for health reasons.

=== Cooking using ghee ===
The mashed beans are mixed with chopped tomatoes, pumpkin or yam leaves, onions and other ingredients. The water that was drained before mashing the beans is added back to the mixture and boiled for about 15 to 20 minutes until the tomatoes soften, while stirring occasionally so that the mixture does not burn. Cow ghee and salt are added to the mixture and boiled for about 5 to 10 minutes while stirring. The result is a creamy paste known as Firinda.

=== Frying the uncoated mashed beans using cooking oil ===
Frying the mashed beans is an alternative way to using ghee. When using cooking oil to fry the mashed beans, adding of ghee can be skipped.

A pot is put on a fire and cooking oil is poured into it, spices such as chopped tomatoes, onions and garlic are added into the cooking oil and fried for about 5 minutes to make a paste. The water that was drained before mashing the beans is added back to the mashed beans and salt is added. The mixture is then boiled for about 15 to 20 minutes while stirring occasionally so that no burning of the mixture occurs. The result is a creamy paste known as Firinda which can be served at this stage. A type of meat or fish can also be added to the Firinda.

=== Adding of a type of meat or fish ===
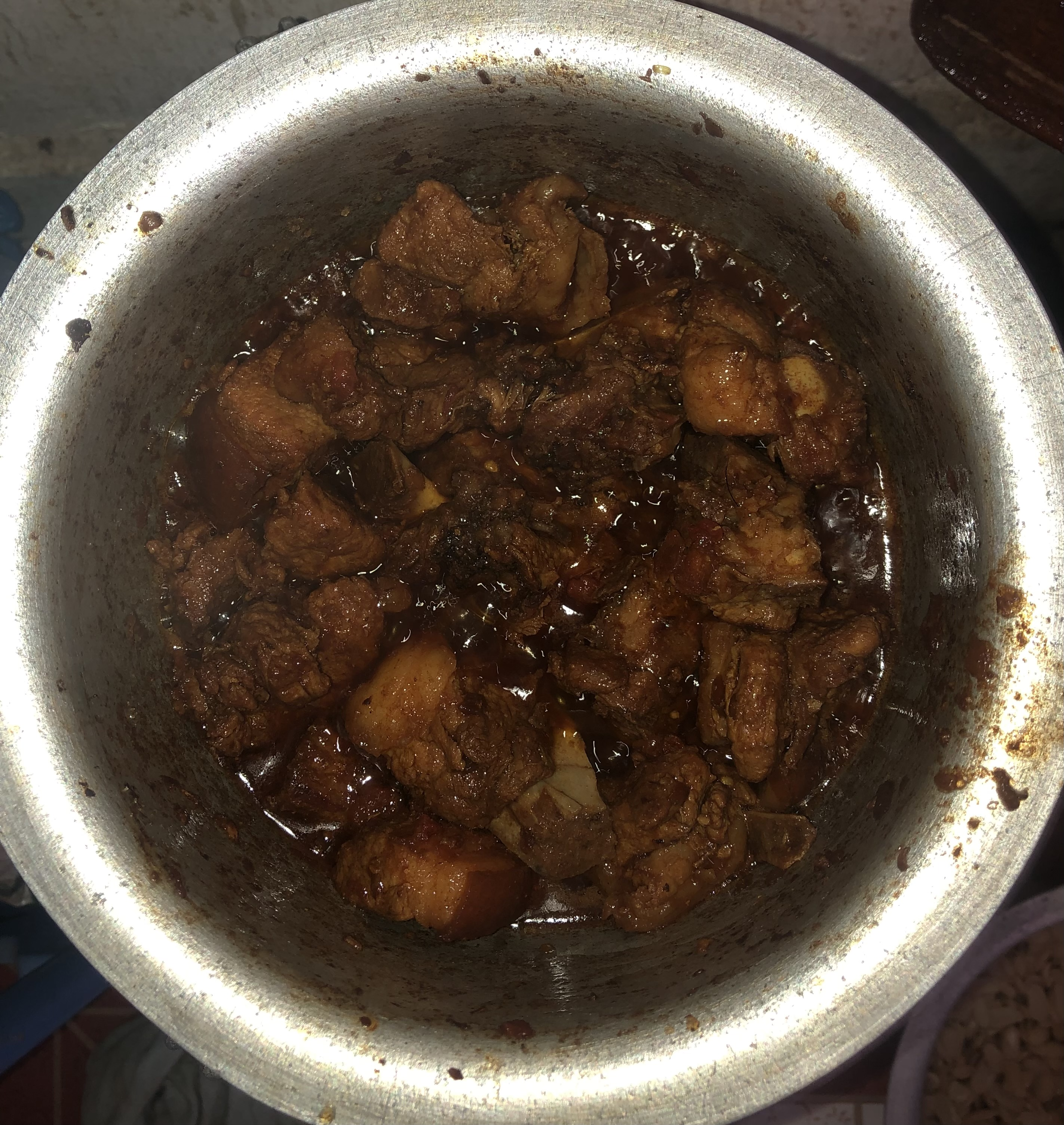
Fried meat that will be used to prepare Firinda sauce

==== Adding type of meat ====
Roasted meat (Omukaro) or deep fried meat such as pork, goat meat or beef can be mixed to the firinda after it has been prepared separately in another pot. And the mixture is boiled for 5 to 10 minutes before it is served.

==== Adding fish ====
Smoked, deep fried or sun dried fish can be mixed to the firinda after it has been prepared separately in another pot. And the mixture is boiled for 5 to 10 minutes before it is served.

== Serving of the Firinda ==
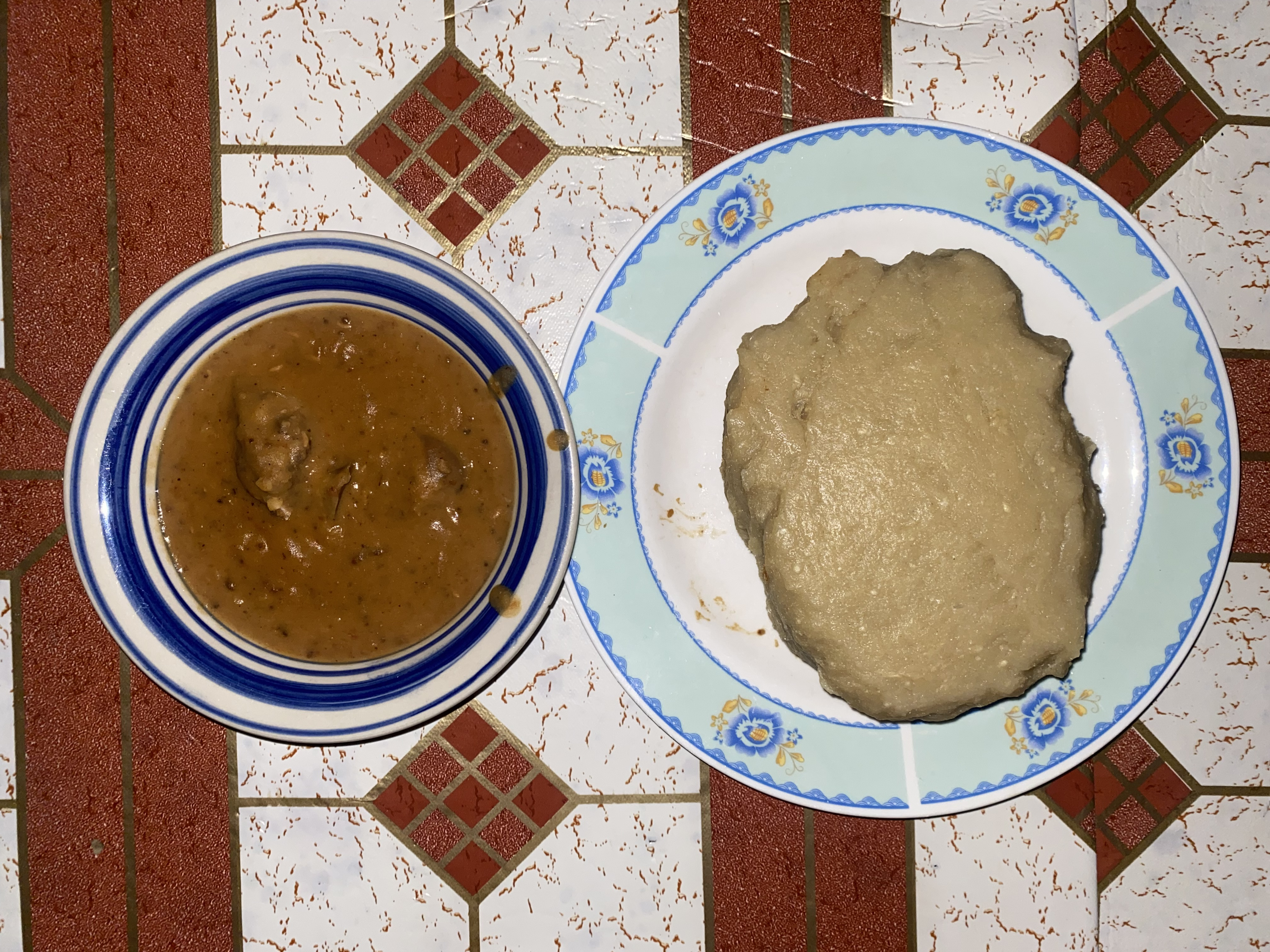
Firinda sauce served with Kalo

Firinda is served in Ekibindi (traditional plate) with Kalo which is put in Endiiro (traditional basket made from papyrus) but it can be served with other foods which include; Matooke, Cassava, Rice, sweet potatoes, Posho among other foods.

== See also ==
- Sombe
- Eshabwe
- Malewa
- Kikomando
- Dek Ngor
