= John Nottingham =

Kenyan colonial administrator, political activist and publicist

John Cato Nottingham (25 February 1928 – 2018) was a British-born Kenyan colonial administrator, political activist, and publicist.

== Early life ==
John Cato Nottingham was born on 25 February 1928 in Coventry, United Kingdom. He was the son of Captain Eric Cato Nottingham, who had served in the British military in the colonies of Nigeria and the Gold Coast. He was educated at Shrewsbury School and, after graduating in 1946, was conscripted into the British Army, being subsequently stationed in Northern Ireland and Germany. In 1949 he left the army and enrolled in Oxford University, studying politics, philosophy and economics.

At the urging of his father, he applied for a job with the British colonial service. In July 1952 the service accepted his application and made him a cadet on probation, while he received specialised training at Oxford for a colonial posting, including instruction in Kiswahili.

== Colonial administration career ==
Nottingham traveled by ship to Mombasa, Kenya Colony in December 1952 and was immediately appointed District Officer of Nyeri.

== Later life ==
For several years Nottingham was Publishing Director at East African Publishing House, helping General China write his two books on Mau Mau and publishing Song of Lawino by Okot p'Bitek. Nottingham later founded his own publishing company, Transafrica Publishers.

Nottingham eventually retired to Cherry Tree Farm in Redhill, Kiambu County, Kenya. He died in 2018, and was buried at Cherry Tree Farm.

== Works ==
- 'Sorcery among the Akamba in Kenya, Journal of African Administration, Vol. 11 (1959), pp. 2-14
- (with Clyde Sanger) 'The Kenya General Election of 1963', Journal of Modern African Studies, Vol. 2, No. 1 (March 1964), pp. 1-40
- (with Carl Gustav Rosberg) The myth of "Mau Mau": nationalism in Kenya. Stanford, Calif.: Published for the Hoover Institution on War, Revolution, and Peace by Praeger, New York, 1966.
- 'Establishing an African Publishing Industry: A Study in Decolonization', African Affairs, Vol. 68, No. 271 (April 1969), pp. 139-144
