= Luwombo =

Traditional Ugandan stew prepared using smoked young banana leaves

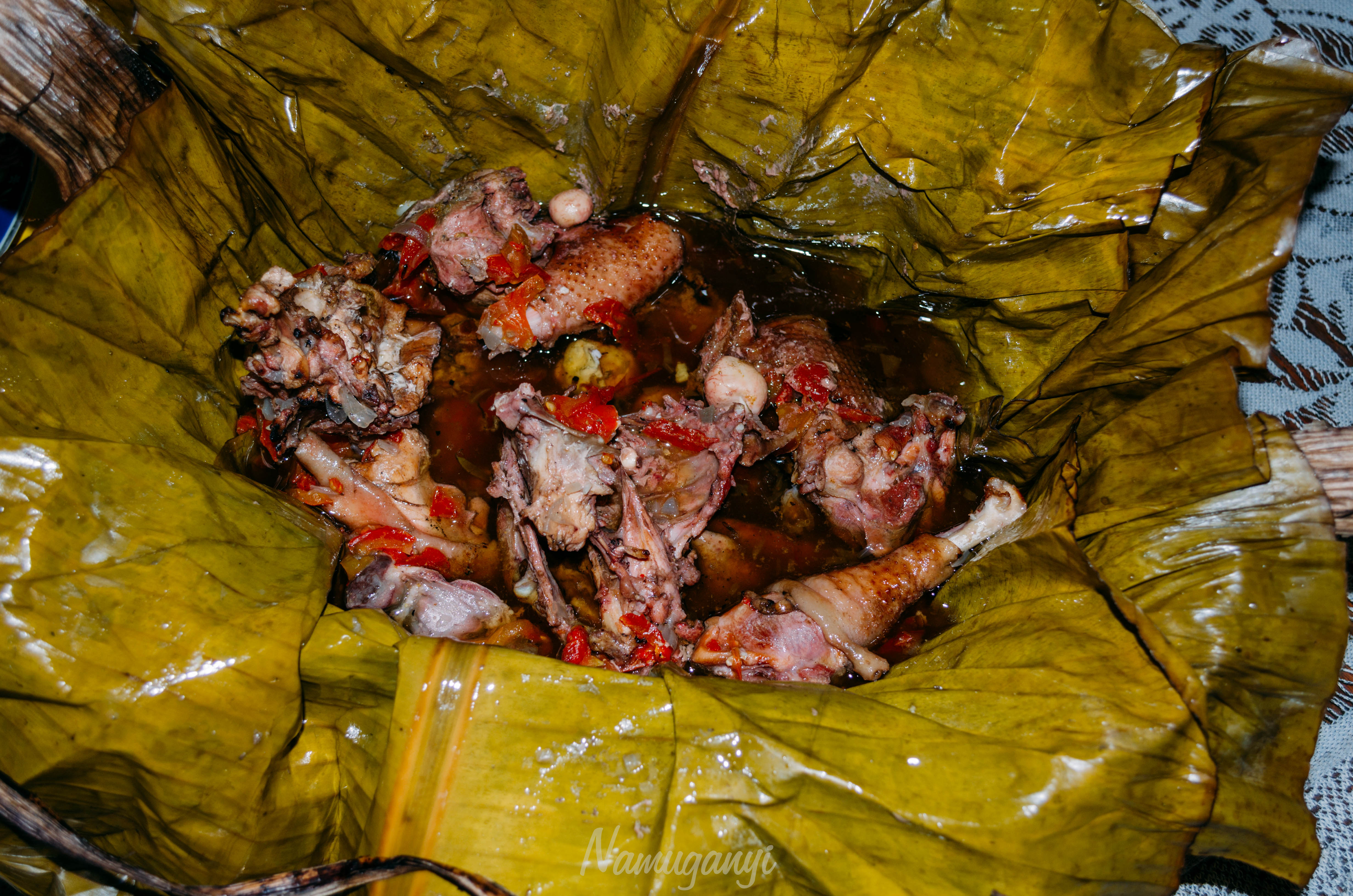
- Chicken Luwombo
- Alternative names: Oluwombo (singular), Mpombo or Empombo (Plural)
- Type: Stew
- Course: Main dish
- Place of origin: Buganda Kingdom
- Region or state: Central Uganda
- Associated cuisine: Matooke, Ugali, yams, rice, sweet potatoes
- Created by: Kawula (Head chef for Kabaka Mwanga of Buganda kingdom
- Invented: 1887
- Cooking time: 60 minutes to 4 hours
- Main ingredients: Smoked banana leaves, a type of meat, salt and water
- Ingredients generally used: Curry powder, Tomatoes, Garlic, vegetables, Onions, ground nuts, green paper, ginger, red pepper, tomatoes, pumpkin leaves
- Variations: Chicken Luwombo, Ground nuts Luwombo, Beef Luwombo, Goat's meat Luwombo

Luwombo, also known as Oluwombo (singular) and as Mpombo or Empombo (plural), is a traditional Ugandan stew or sauce prepared using smoked young banana leaves from the Ndiizi banana plant. Starting in 1887 in pre-colonial Buganda, the dish was reserved for kings and princes, but has since become eaten by the general Baganda populace, and by other ethnic groups in Uganda.

Luwombo has many variations, including chicken Luwombo, meat Luwombo, fish Luwombo, and groundnuts mixed with mushrooms Luwombo, among other variations of Luwombo.

== History ==
Kawuuta (also written as Kawula or Kawuula in some sources), who served as the head royal chef in Buganda kingdom, first served Luwombo to Kabaka Mwanga in 1887. It then became a meal reserved for royal visitors and Buganda chiefs in pre-colonial Uganda.

Luwombo was originally served to the royal family and royal visitors and at ceremonies such as Kwanjula (introduction ceremony in Buganda) and Embaga (wedding ceremony in Buganda) but has become eaten more broadly, and is not associated with times or occasions.

== Ingredients ==
Main ingredients include smoked banana leaves, a meat such as goat meat, chicken, beef or fish, ground nuts and salt and water.

Additional ingredients may include tomatoes, onions, carrots, garlic, ginger, green pepper, salt, green leafy vegetables, cooking oil among other spices.

== Preparation ==
Luwombo is prepared in homes, restaurants and hotels.

The aroma for the Luwombo stew is derived from the way the type of meat is grilled, the way the banana leaves are smoked and also the type of banana leaves used to prepare it.

=== Smoking of the Ndiizi banana leaves ===
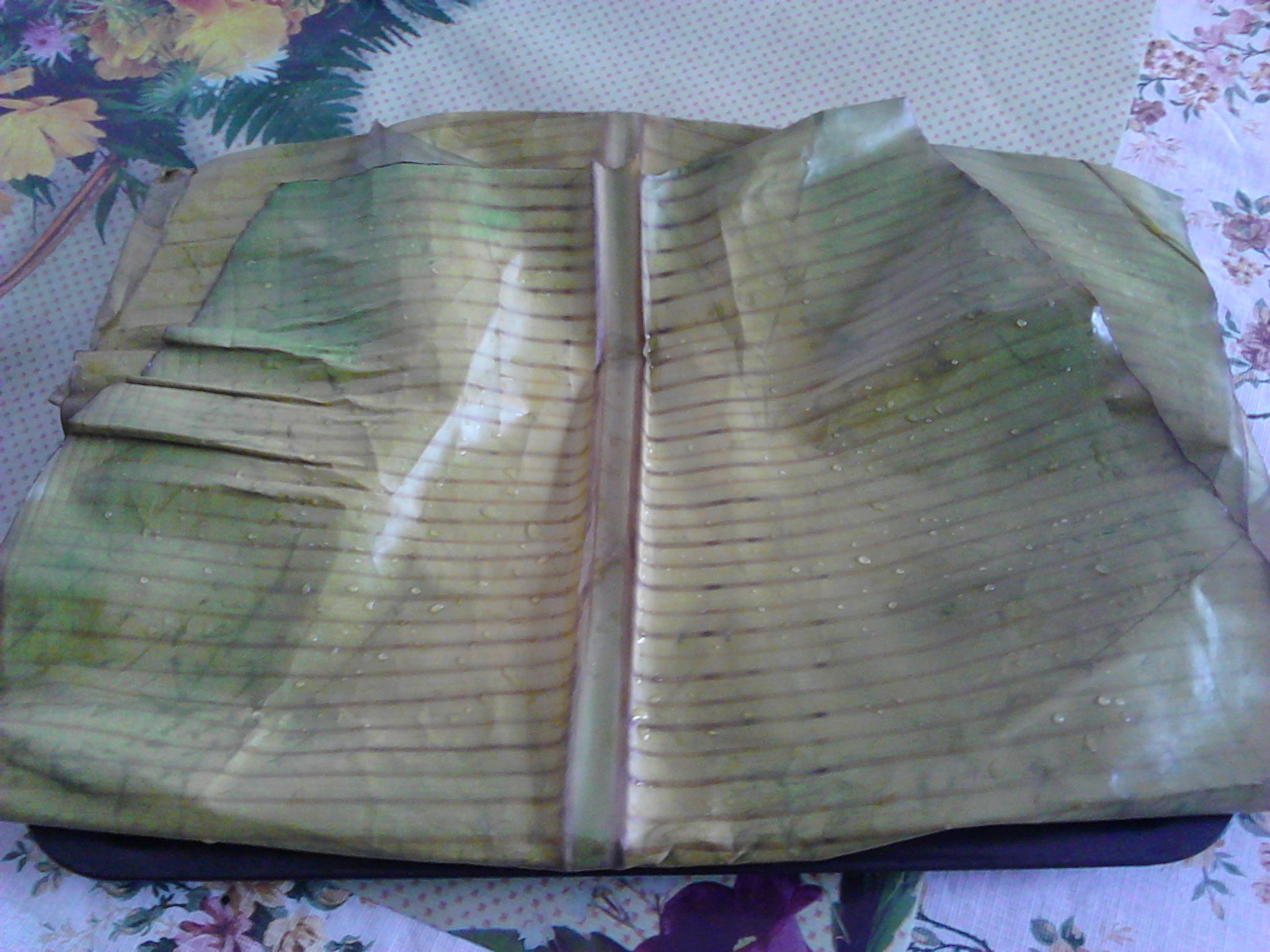
a half folded smoked banana leaf to use used in preparing Luwombo

The fresh young banana leaves from the Ndiizi banana plants are harvested and they should not be torn or contain any holes in them. The harvested banana leaves are first smoked over an open flame, using dry banana leaves (essanja) or hot charcoal, to give them a brownish-yellowish color and a smoky aroma.

The leaf stalk and midrib of the smoked banana leaves are removed using a knife, and the leaves are cleaned with a damp cloth to remove any dust or ash. The smoked leaves are then inspected to ensure they have no holes before being folded in half.

Smoking the banana leaves enhances the food’s smoky aroma, reduces the sap in the leaves, prevents them from tearing easily, and makes them soft and flexible for wrapping.

=== Preparation of ingredients ===
The beef, chicken or goat meat, is the main ingredient and should be grilled (Kukalirira) first. However, it can also be prepared without grilling after which well cut pieces are washed if desired. If preparing chicken, it can be prepared either whole or chopped into pieces and also washed if desired.

Spices such as tomatoes, onions, carrots, garlic, ginger, and green pepper, among others, are chopped or sliced. They can either be fried separately in a saucepan with cooking oil until ready or added raw.

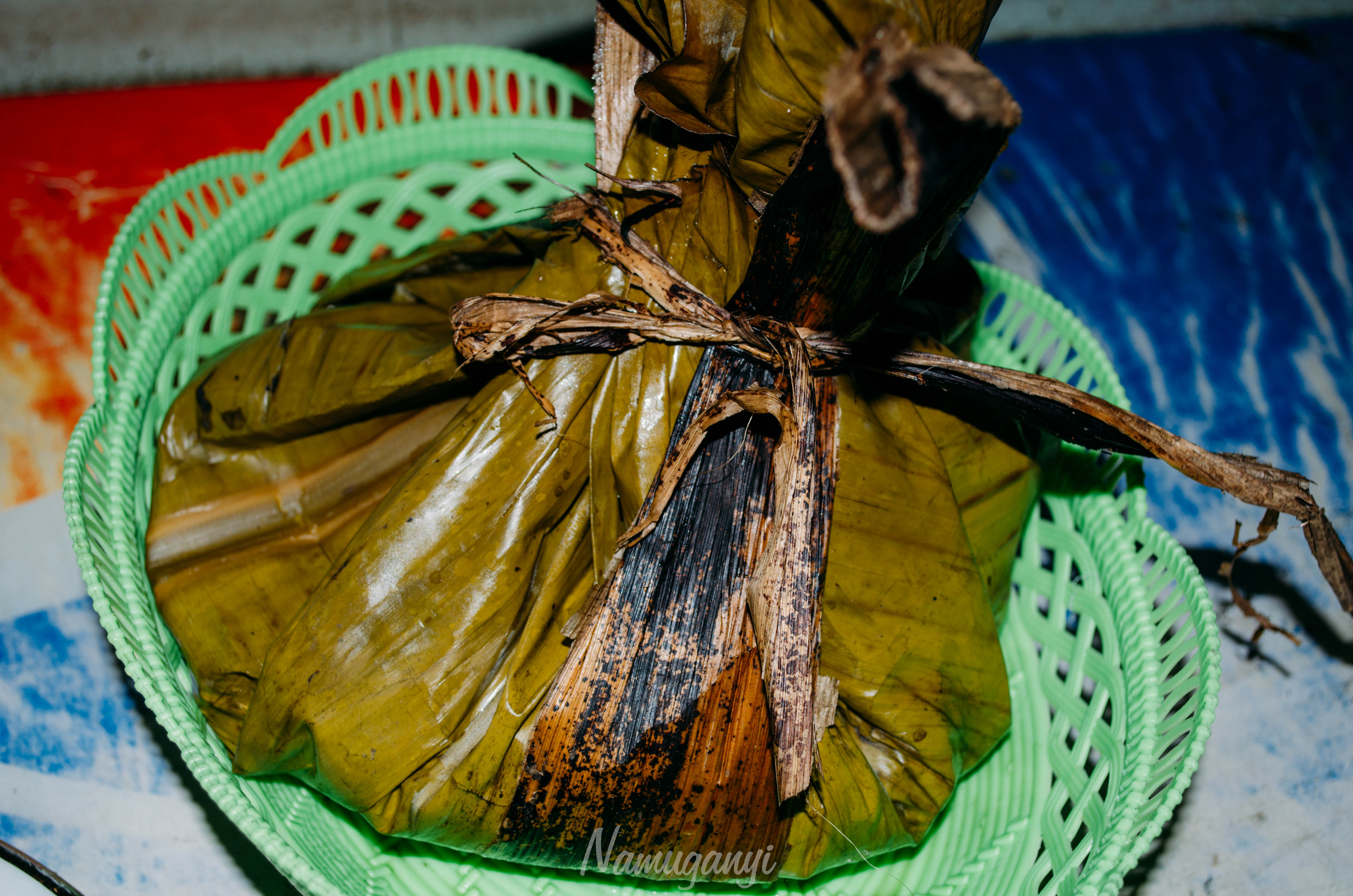
Luwombo tied with a banana fibre

=== Wrapping of the oluwombo ===
A smoked banana leaf large enough to accommodate the grilled meat or chicken and spices is placed on top of a clean basket (ekibo in Luganda) or on a slightly curved plate. A cut-off piece of another smoked banana leaf is then placed on top of the first leaf.

The chopped pieces of the chosen type of meat, such as goat's meat, are then placed on top of the small cut-off banana leaf ensuring that the bones do not tear the smoked banana leaf during boiling or tying of the banana leaf. The species are then added together with some water.

The smoked banana leaves are then folded and tied with a string made from a banana fibre (ekyaayi) or a strip of the smoked banana leaf midrib to prevent any spillage of ingredients.

It is not recommended to make the Luwombo too large, as some pieces of meat may not cook properly or evenly. Regardless of the number of people to be served, it is best to prepare a small Luwombo for each person.

=== Boiling of the Luwombo or mpombo ===
The banana leaf stalks that were chopped off during the banana smoking process, are chopped into pieces and placed in a saucepan large enough to accommodate the number of mpombo being prepared. Freshly harvested banana stalks can be used, or alternatively, pieces of wood or chopped banana stems can be substituted for the leaf stalks.

The mpombo to be prepared are placed in the saucepan, and water is then added. The saucepan is covered with additional banana leaves to trap the steam. The mpombo is then boiled on low heat for about one to four hours using firewood or a charcoal stove.

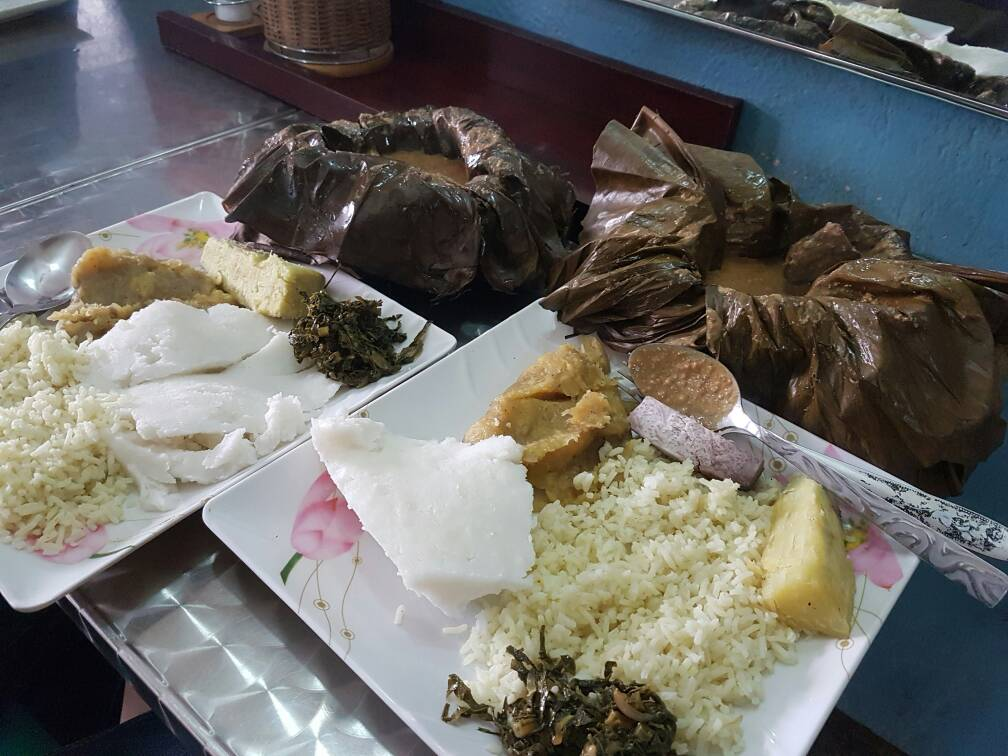
Luwombo served with rice and posho

== Serving ==
Luwombo is typically served hot. It is traditionally served in the banana leaves it was prepared in, but based on preference, is sometimes placed on a plate. Luwombo can be eaten with matooke, posho, yams, rice, sweet potatoes, or any other preferred dish.

== See also ==
- Firinda
- Sombe
- Dek Ngor
