= East African Publishing House =

Publishing company in Nairobi, Kenya

- Founded: 1965
- Country of origin: Kenya
- Headquarters location: Nairobi
- Publication types: Books

The East African Publishing House (EAPH) was a publishing company established in Nairobi in 1965. It was the first indigenous publishing firm in East Africa.

== History ==
The East African Institute of Social and Cultural Affairs started to consider the possibility of starting a new publishing firm in 1964. They approached André Deutsch, who had previously published Tom Mboya's Freedom and After and been involved in a publishers called African Universities Press. Deutsch and the Institute cofounded East African Publishing House in 1965. Initially, Deutsch owned 49 percent of the company, but editorial disagreement over the kind of books to publish led to his withdrawal in 1966. The Institute bought Deutsch's shares, making EAPH the first publishing firm to be wholly owned and managed in East Africa.

From 1968 to around 1970, the company published the literary journal Busara.

For several years, John Nottingham was Publishing Director at EAPB, helping General China write his two books on Mau Mau and publishing Song of Lawino by Okot p'Bitek. Nottingham later founded his own publishing company, Transafrica Publishers.

Phoenix Publishers, founded by Gacheche Waruingi, grew out of EAPH's eventual collapse. Phoenix Publishers opened in 1988 with a reissue of EAPH primary school readers, and adopted authors previously published by EAPH.
