= Bakiga Nation =

Cultural and social festival in Uganda

Bakiga Nation, also known as Rukundo Egumeho (translated as "Let Love Prevail" in the Rukiga language), is an annual festival in Uganda that brings together the Bakiga people, an ethnic group primarily from southwestern Uganda, as well as members of the Bakiga diaspora residing in urban centers such as Kampala.

== Background ==
The Bakiga Nation event started around 2012 in December, and the most recent was the 14th edition in 2024. The event aims to celebrate and promote the culture of Kiga people through activities such as charity initiatives, festivals, arts, and merchandise. Centered around the theme Rukundo Egumeho, the event emphasizes cultural preservation, community unity, and socioeconomic empowerment.

The Bakiga are a Bantu ethnic group native to the Kigezi region in southwestern Uganda, including districts such as Kabale, Kisoro, Rukungiri, and Kanungu. The Bakiga have historically been organized into clans and are recognized for their agricultural practices and resilience. The Bakiga Nation event was established to address the challenges faced by the Bakiga diaspora, particularly in urban areas, while celebrating and preserving their cultural heritage.

== Event overview ==
The event is a multifaceted event that highlights various aspects of Kiga culture. Key components of the event include:

- Performances: Traditional music and dance performances, such as the Ekizino dance, which showcases the strength and agility of the Bakiga people. These performances often feature traditional instruments like the enanga and amadinda. Famous musicians are always invited to entertain the revelers.
- Art Exhibitions: Displays of local art, crafts, and traditional attire, providing a platform for Bakiga artists to showcase their work and promote cultural heritage.
- Food and Cuisine: A variety of traditional Bakiga dishes, such as Empengere, Eshabwe, Irish potatoes, matooke and karo (millet bread), are offered to attendees, allowing them to experience authentic Kiga cuisine.
- Networking Opportunities: Spaces for attendees to connect, share experiences, and build relationships within the Bakiga diaspora, fostering a sense of belonging and collaboration. Presentations and talks are also conducted by community leaders, activists, and professionals on topics related to social and economic development within the Bakiga community.

The Bakiga Nation event aims to promote and preserve the cultural heritage of the Bakiga people, strengthen unity and solidarity among the Bakiga, and celebrate the achievements and resilience of the Bakiga people.

== See also ==
- Bakiga
- Bantu
