= Kikalayi =

Ugandan pork dish prepared using a frying pan on an open fire

Kikalayi is a traditional Ugandan dish in the country’s culinary culture, particularly among pork enthusiasts.

== Origin and cultural significance ==
The name "Kikalayi" is derived from the large frying pans used in its preparation. These pans are often crafted from durable metal and are known for their ability to evenly distribute heat, ensuring the pork is cooked to perfection. The dish is primarily associated with Uganda’s urban centers and trading hubs, where pork joints, locally known as "pork zones," are popular gathering places. Pork consumption in Uganda was limited to specific communities due to cultural and religious reasons, but over time, it has gained widespread acceptance, with Kikalayi emerging as a preferred delicacy.

== Cooking techniques for Kikalayi ==
The process begins with cutting the pork into sizeable chunks, separating the skin and fat from the meat. The skin and fat are then placed in a large frying pan or saucepan over moderate heat to render the fat. This step is crucial, as the fat provides the necessary oil for frying, eliminating the need for additional cooking oil. Once the fat is fully rendered and the skin turns crispy, the excess oil is set aside, leaving only a small amount in the pan. Next, the pork pieces are added to the pan and fried in the rendered fat over medium heat. Continuous stirring ensures even browning and prevents burning. The meat is cooked until it achieves a crispy exterior while remaining tender inside. Some variations include seasoning the pork with salt, black pepper, and garlic before or during frying to enhance its flavor. In certain preparations, additional ingredients such as onions, tomatoes, and green peppers are introduced towards the end of the cooking process, adding a slight variation to the dish. However, the traditional version keeps it simple, focusing on the natural taste of well-cooked pork.

== Recipe ==
Here is a detailed recipe to prepare this savory at home.

- 2 pounds (approximately 1 kg) of pork with skin and fat
- Salt and black pepper to taste
- 4 large tomatoes, finely chopped
- 2 large onions, finely chopped
- 2 carrots, grated
- ½ small cabbage, shredded
- 2 cloves of garlic, finely chopped
- 1 green bell pepper, finely chopped
- 2 Irish potatoes, chopped (optional)
- Curry powder to taste (optional)

== Roles ==
Kikalayi plays an important purpose in keeping friends together by fostering community and strengthening social capital. It also supports the local pork vendors economically.

== See also ==
- Luwombo
- Cuisine of Uganda
- List of African dishes
