= Kikomando =

Ugandan cuisine made of chapatti and beans

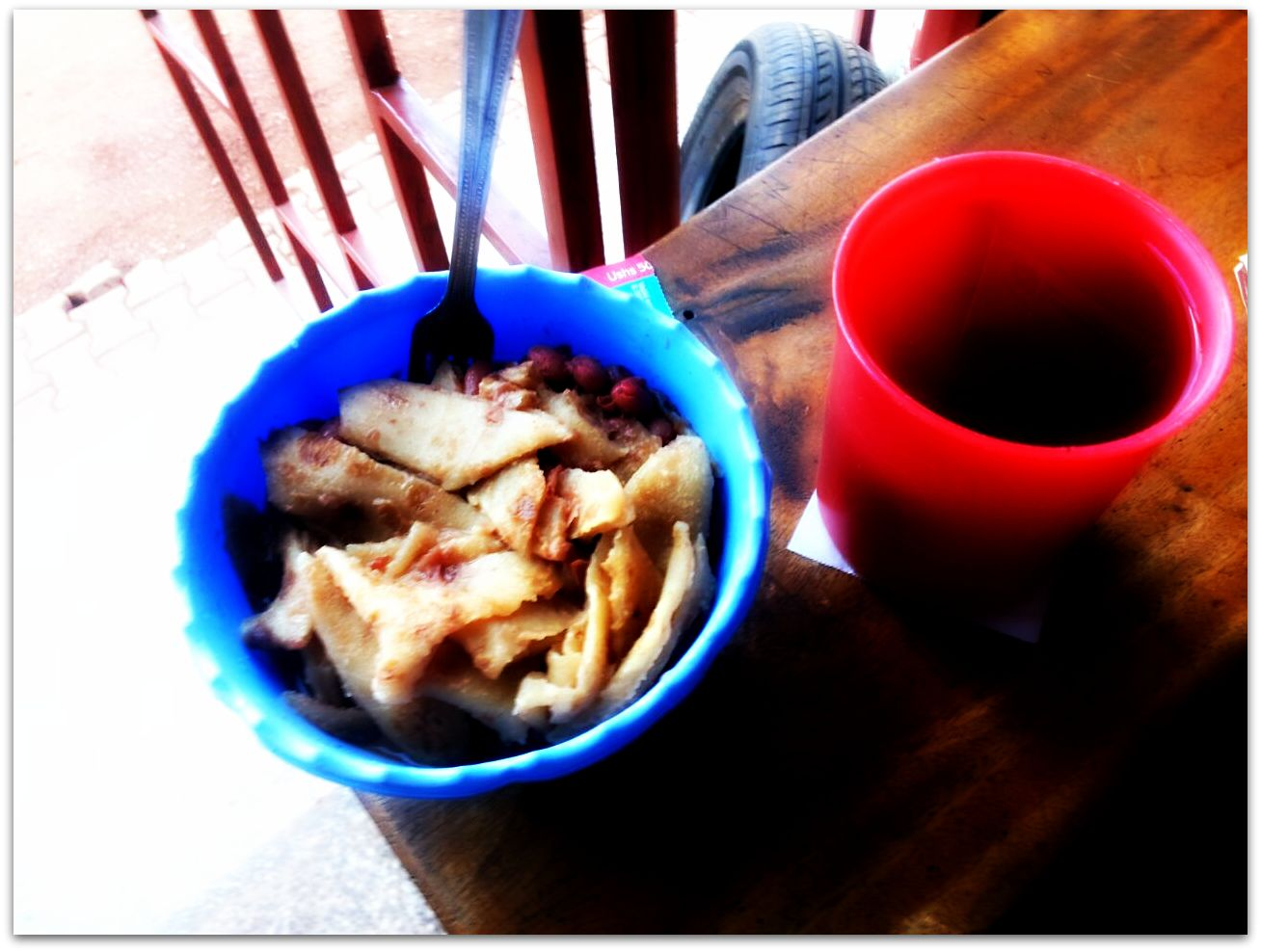
- Place of origin: Uganda
- Region or state: East Africa
- Associated cuisine: Uganda
- Invented: Early 2000s
- Main ingredients: Chapati and fried beans

Kikomando is a Ugandan dish consisting of chapati and beans. It is a variant of the rolex. This dish was created in the early 2000s.

== Origin ==
The name, kikomando, was coined by Ugandan singer, Bobi Wine, who sang about the dish in one of his songs. Ugandans claim that eating kikomando will make the eater strong like Arnold Schwarzenegger in his movie, Commando. Kikomando is made by cutting up pieces of Ugandan chapati, which is different from Indian chapati in that it is made with all-purpose flour instead of whole-wheat flour, and fried beans. In addition to fried beans, other variations of kikomando have avocado, meat stew, gravy, chicken, or liver added to them. This dish is served both in street food stalls and in higher-end restaurants in the country. It is popular among university students because of its affordability as a meal.

== See also ==
- Sombe
- Eshabwe
- Malewa
- Firinda
