= Dek Ngor =

Traditional Ugandan sauce

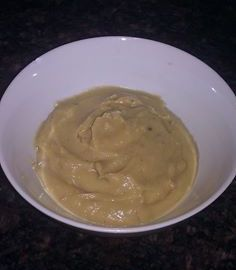
- Alternative names: Dek Ngoo, Dek Ngor Lapena, Dek-ngor, Agira
- Type: Sauce
- Course: Main course
- Place of origin: Northern Uganda
- Region or state: Lango and West Nile in Uganda
- Associated cuisine: Kwon Kal (millet bread), Layata (sweet potatoes), Ugali, boiled Cassava
- Main ingredients: Lapena (Pigeon peas a.k.a. Yellow split peas). Odi (Sim sim paste or Peanut butter). Table salt
- Ingredients generally used: Moo Yaa (Shea Butter) a.k.a. (Moo Yao, moya). Magadi (rock salt a.k.a. Sodium bicarbonate)

Dek Ngor also known as (Dek Ngor Lapena, Dek-ngor, Dek Ngoo, Agira) is a traditional Ugandan sauce that is made from Lapena (pigeon peas) and it originates from Northern Uganda among the Acholi people. It is also eaten in Lango and West Nile regions of Uganda.

== Ingredients ==
=== Major ingredients ===
- Lapena (Pigeon peas a.k.a. Yellow split peas)
- Odi (Sim sim paste or Peanut butter)
- Table salt

=== Optional ingredients ===
- Moo Yaa (Shea Butter) a.k.a. (Moo Yao, moya).
- Magadi (rock salt a.k.a. Sodium bicarbonate)

== Preparation ==
Lapena (dry pigeon peas) are soaked in warm water for 20 minutes. The peas are removed from the water, and sun dried for about 10 minutes. The dried lapena are ground to split the seeds into two. After grinding, winnowing is carried out to remove the peas covers. The already split yellow peas can also be used to skip the grinding and winnowing to boiling of the peas.

After winnowing, the split peas are boiled in water until they soften. During the boiling, Magadi is or can be added to speed up the boiling process of the peas. An Ogwec (a mingling stick) is used to stir and mash the peas until they turn to a thick creamy paste. The salt is added to the thick creamy paste. The creamy paste is mixed with simsim paste or peanut butter (to improve the taste, the aroma and also the thickness of the paste). Moo-yaa can be added but it is optional. The resulting sauce is called Dek-ngor.

== Serving ==
Dek Ngor is served at traditional functions such as marriages, baptism, family reunions, naming of new born babies and also in restaurants. It has to be served to the in-laws from the wife's side when they visit the family into which their daughter married.

Dek ngor can be eaten without any additional foods or it can be served with Kwon Kal (millet bread), Layata (sweet potatoes), Ugali, Cassava among other foods .

== See also ==
- Sombe
- Eshabwe
- Malewa
- Kikomando
