= Busara =

- Language: English

Publication details
- Former name: Nexus
- History: 1967–1975
- Publisher: East African Publishing House (Kenya)
- Frequency: Quarterly

Standard abbreviations
- ISO 4: Busara

Indexing
- ISSN: 0007-6376
- OCLC no.: 473726353

Busara (formerly Nexus, 1967–1969) was a literary journal founded by students from the English Department at the University of Nairobi. It circulated from 1967 to 1975, playing a key role in shaping East African literary criticism and offering a platform for both emerging and established writers.

== Publication History ==
Busara was initially published by the East African Publishing House and later taken over by the East African Literature Bureau. The magazine was deeply involved in the politics of literary and cultural production in East Africa during its time. Key contributions included emphasizing the influence of oral literature on modern East African aesthetics, challenging Eurocentric literary traditions, and advocating for an “African Cultural Revolution” that positioned literature as a communal and performative art, rather than as an academic pursuit. Beyond fostering literary discourse, Busara provided a space for new voices and contributed to the growth of Kenyan literature by engaging with the decolonization process, re-examining memories, and constructing new mythologies.

In 1975, Busara ceased publication following the dissolution of the East African Community and the subsequent closure of the East African Literature Bureau.

=== Name Change ===
Originally the journal was founded as Nexus, and four issues appeared under this name in 1967 and 1968. In 1968, it was renamed as "Busara", which means "wisdom" in Kiswahili. The change reflected broader shifts in the politics of cultural production in East Africa, aligning with other publications that adopted Kiswahili names during the period. This name change took place against the backdrop of the "Nairobi Revolution" of 1968, when faculty at the University of Nairobi advocated for restructuring the English Department into a Literature Department with African literature at its core.

== Editorial Staff and Notable Contributors ==
Awori wa Kataka and Richard Gacheche were the first editors of Nexus. Jared Angira became its editor in chief in 1969. Notable contributors and editorial staff included Taban lo Liyong, Grace Ogot, Adrian Roscoe, Angus Calder, and Ngũgĩ wa Thiong'o, Jared Angira, and Chris Wanjala.

=== List of Editors ===
Year	Issue	Editor(s)
1968	Volume 1 No. 1	Awori wa Kataka, Richard Gacheche (Asst.)
1969	Volume 2 No. 1	Richard Gacheche, Amin Kassam (Asst.)
1969	Volume 2 No. 2	Richard Gacheche, Amin Kassam (Asst.)
1969	Volume 2 No. 3	Richard Gacheche, Jared Angira Roberts (Asst.)
1970	Volume 3 No. 1	Jared Angira, Kamau Murua (Asst.)
1971	Volume 3 No. 2	Jared Angira
1971	Volume 3 No. 3	Esther Mukuye
1971	Volume 3 No. 4	Mugo Humphrey
1971	Volume 4 No. ¾	Mugo Humphrey
1974	Volume 6 No. 2	W. Osotsi
