= Jared Angira =

Kenyan poet (born 1947)

- Born: November 21, 1947 (age 78); Siaya, Kenya
- Citizenship: Kenyan
- Education: University of Nairobi
- Occupation: Poet
- Organisation: Kenya Writers' Association
- Known for: Early Kenyan post-independence poetry
- Notable work: Juices (1970)

Jared Angira (born 21 November 1947) is a Kenyan poet. He has been called "the country's first truly significant poet".

== Life ==
Angira was born in 1947 in Siaya, Kenya. He studied commerce at the University of Nairobi from 1968 until 1971. He contributed to the first (1968) issue of the literary journal Busara, and was appointed its editor-in-chief in 1969. He also founded the Kenya Writers' Association.

== Works ==
- Juices, London (1970)
- Silent Voices, London (1972)
- Soft Corals, London (1973)
- "Experimental Writing", in Gurr and Calder, Writers in East Africa, 1974.
