= Okot p'Bitek =

Ugandan poet (1931–1982)

- Born: 7 June 1931; Gulu, Protectorate of Uganda, British Empire
- Died: 20 July 1982 (aged 51); Kampala, Uganda
- Education: University of Bristol, University of Wales, Aberystwyth, University of Oxford
- Notable work: Song of Lawino (1966)

Okot p'Bitek (7 June 1931 – 19 July 1982) was a Ugandan poet, who achieved wide international recognition for Song of Lawino, a long poem dealing with the tribulations of a rural African wife whose husband has taken up urban life and wishes everything to be westernised. Song of Lawino was originally written in the Acholi dialect of Southern Luo, translated by the author into English, and published in 1966. It was a breakthrough work, creating an audience among anglophone Africans for direct, topical poetry in English; and incorporating traditional attitudes and thinking in an accessible yet faithful literary vehicle. It was followed by the Song of Ocol (1970), the husband's reply.

The "East African Song School" or "Okot School poetry" is now an academic identification of the work following his direction, also popularly called "comic singing": a forceful type of dramatic verse monologue rooted in traditional song and phraseology.

== Early life ==
Okot p'Bitek was born in 1931 in Gulu, in the North Uganda grasslands. His father, Jebedayo Opi, was a schoolteacher, while his mother, Lacwaa Cerina, was a traditional singer, storyteller and dancer. His ethnic background was Acholi, and he wrote first in the Acholi dialect, also known as Lwo. Acholi is a dialect of Southern Luo, one of the Western Nilotic languages.

At school he was noted as a singer, dancer, drummer and athlete. He was educated at Gulu High School, then at King's College, Budo, where he composed an opera based on traditional songs.

== University ==
He travelled abroad first as a player with the Ugandan national football team, in 1958. He gave up on football as a possible career, stayed in Britain, and studied education at the University of Bristol and then law at the University of Wales, Aberystwyth. He then took a Bachelor of Letters degree in social anthropology from St Peter's College, Oxford, with a 1963 dissertation on Acholi and Lango traditional cultures.

In 1970, p'Bitek failed his DPhil at Oxford, his examiners citing a lack of clarity over which ethnographical accounts were firsthand observations and whether certain beliefs outlined in the thesis were of the past or present. The text also departed from its approved title and contained spelling and grammar errors. It has alternatively been claimed that p'Bitek was deliberately failed for political reasons. The dissertation was published nearly unchanged in 1971 as The Religion of the Central Luo by a Kenyan publisher.

== Career ==
He wrote an early novel, Lak Tar Miyo Kinyero Wi Lobo (1953), in Lwo, later translated into English as White Teeth. It concerns the experiences of a young Acholi man moving away from home, to find work and so a wife. Okot p'Bitek organised an arts festival at Gulu, and then at Kisumu. Subsequently he taught at Makerere University (1964–66) and then was Director of Uganda's National Theatre and National Cultural Centre (1966–68).

He became unpopular with the Ugandan government, and took teaching posts outside the country. He took part in the International Writing Program at the University of Iowa in 1969. He was at the Institute of African Studies of University College, Nairobi from 1971 as a senior research fellow and lecturer, with visiting positions at University of Texas at Austin and University of Ife in Nigeria in 1978/9. He remained in exile during the regime of Idi Amin, returning in 1982 to Makerere University, to teach creative writing. He participated in the inaugural International Book Fair of Radical Black and Third World Books in London in April 1982, when he performed extracts from his poems "Song of Lawino" and "Song of Ocol" in what would be his last public appearance.

Apart from his poetry and novels, he also took part in an ongoing debate about the integrity of scholarship on traditional African religion, with the assertion in African Religions in Western Scholarship (1971) that scholars centred on European concerns were "intellectual smugglers". His point, aimed partly at Africans who had had a training in Christian traditions, was that it led to a concentration on matters distant from the actual concerns of Africans; this has been contested by others. He was an atheist.

== Death ==
He died in Kampala of a stroke in 1982. He was survived by daughters Agnes Oyella, Jane Okot p'Bitek who wrote a Song of Farewell (1994), Olga Okot Bitek Ojelel and Cecilia Okot Bitek who work as nurses, Otoniya J. Okot Bitek who writes poetry, and a son George Okot p'Bitek, who is a teacher in Kampala. Olga, Cecilia, and Otoniya all live in Vancouver, British Columbia, Canada. In 2004 Juliane was the recipient of an award in the Commonwealth Short Story Contest for her story "Going Home". These are the daughters of his wife Caroline.

== Works ==
- Lak Tar Miyo Kinyero Wi Lobo (1953); novel in Luo, English translation White Teeth
- Song of Lawino: A Lament (East Africa Publishing House, 1966); poem, translation by author of a Luo original Wer pa Lawino
- Wer pa Lawino (East Africa Publishing House, 1969). The Defence of Lawino, alternate translation by Taban Lo Liyong (2001)
- Song of Ocol (East Africa Publishing House, 1970); poem, written in English
- Religion of the Central Luo (1971)
- Two Songs: Song of a Prisoner, Song of Malaya (1971); poems
- African Religions in Western Scholarship (1971, Nairobi)
- Africa's Cultural Revolution (1973); essays
- Horn of My Love; translations of traditional oral verse. London: Heinemann Educational Books, 1974. ISBN 0-435-90147-8
- Hare and Hornbill (1978) folktale collection
- Acholi Proverbs (1985)
- Artist, the Ruler: Essays on Art, Culture and Values (1986)
- Modern Cookery

== Relevant literature ==
- Rettovà, Alena. "Generic Fracturing in Okot p’Bitek’s White Teeth." The Journal of Commonwealth Literature 58, no. 2 (2023): 427-441.
