= Song of Lawino =

1966 epic poem by Okot p'Bitek

- Author: Okot p'Bitek
- Subject: Post-colonialism
- Genre: Epic poetry, World literature
- Publication date: 1966
- Publication place: Uganda

Song of Lawino (Acholi: Wer pa Lawino) is an epic poem written by Ugandan poet Okot p'Bitek. It was first published in 1966 in an English translation by the author, although Chapter 14, its final chapter, was removed. It was quickly translated into other languages. The complete poem in the original Acholi Luo language was published later in 1969. Taban Lo Liyong published an English translation of chapter 14 in 1993 as well as a new translation of the entire poem in 2001 (as The Defence of Lawino).

Song of Lawino has become one of the most widely read literary works originating from Africa. It has also become culturally iconic within Africa, because of its scathing display of how traditional society was being destroyed by colonialism.

Song of Lawino was originally written in rhyming couplets and had a regular meter. The poem is told from the point of view of Lawino in the first person.

p'Bitek published a follow-up poem in English, Song of Ocol, in 1970.

== Plot ==
Song of Lawino, which is a narrative poem, describes how Lawino's husband, Ocol, the son of the tribal leader of their Acholi tribe, has taken another wife, Clementine, who is educated and acts European. Although Ocol's polygamy is accepted by society, and by Lawino herself, her description of his actions shows that he is shunning Lawino in favour of Clementine. Ocol is also said to be fascinated with the culture of the European colonialists. As an example of this, Lawino says Ocol no longer engages, or has any interest in, the ritualistic African dance but prefers the ballroom-style dances introduced by the colonising Europeans. This loss of culture on the part of Ocol is what disturbs Lawino the most. The poem is an extended appeal from Lawino to Ocol to stay true to his own customs, and to abandon his desire to be white.

The book also advocates for the African culture that has been lost by the educated elite. Lawino bemoans her husband's lack of African pride and she romanticizes all that is black. Lawino says "all that is black is beautiful."

== See also ==
- Petri Liukkonen. "Okot p'Bitek". Books and Writers. (contains extract of "Song of Lawino")
- Daniel, G. "Song of Lawino: Un cas de contestation en Afrique." Canadian Journal of African Studies/La Revue canadienne des études africaines 5, no. 2 (1971): 193–212.
