= Sombe =

Ugandan stew made from Cassava leaves

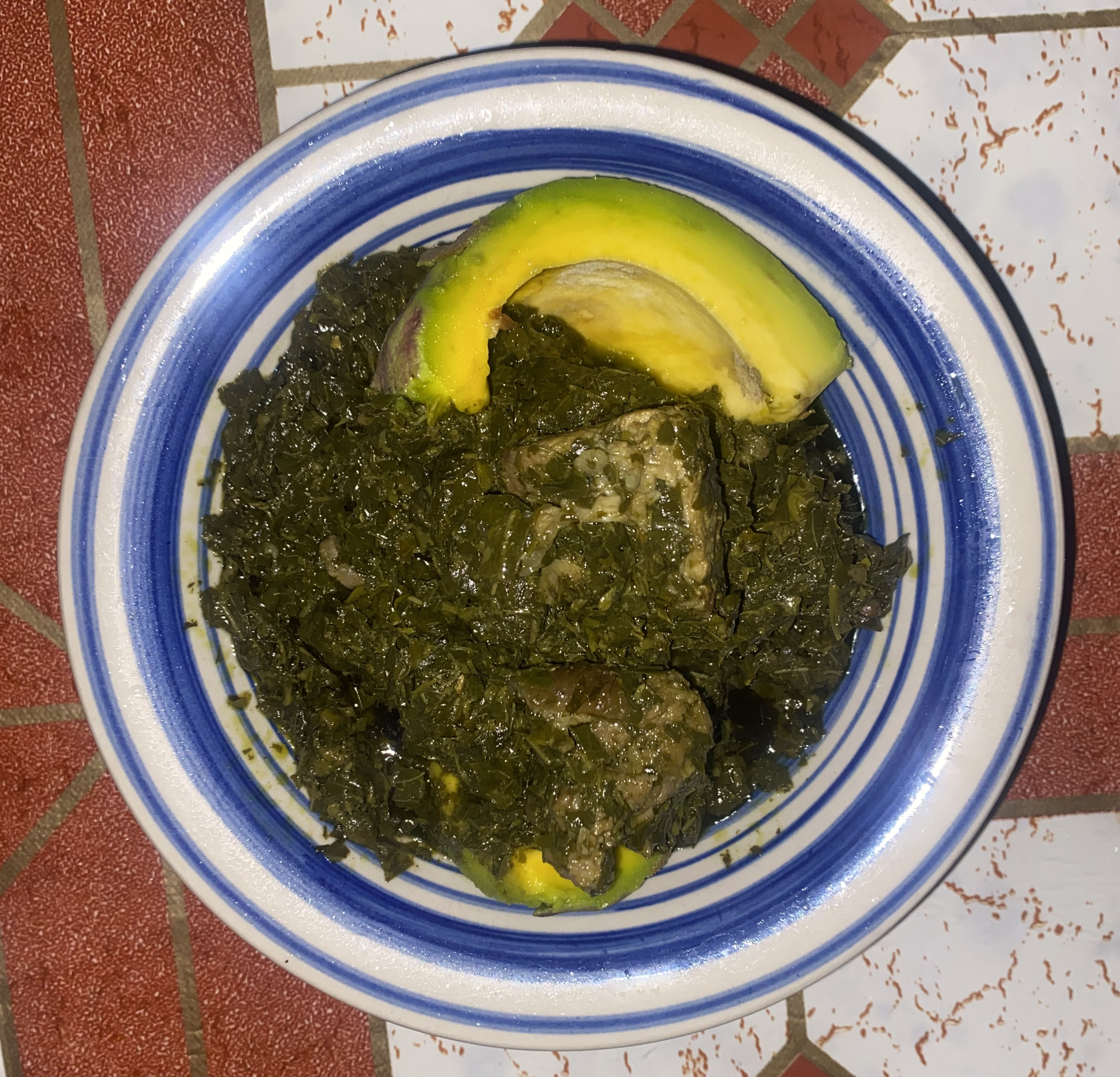
- Sombe stew with meat and avocado
- Type: Stew
- Course: Main course
- Place of origin: Rwenzururu Kingdom
- Region or state: Western Uganda
- Cooking time: to 3 hours
- Main ingredients: Pounded Cassava leaves, Palm oil, Fish or a type of Meat
- Ingredients generally used: Curry powder, Tomatoes, Garlic, vegetables, Onions, okra, ground nuts, spinach, lenga-lenga (amaranth leaves), green paper, ginger, red pepper, tomatoes, pumpkin leaves, salt, eggplants

Sombe, also known as Cassava leaves stew, is a type of stew native to the Bakonzo in Uganda and also the people of the Eastern DRC, Burundians, and the Banyarwanda. It is traditionally made from freshly mashed cassava leaves as the main ingredient, mixed with either fish, ground nut paste, or any type of meat such as beef, goat, or pork. Sombe is served majorly with Bundu (also known as mingled Tapioca, Kalo (In Luganda), or fufu (in Lingala), but it can also be served with rice, posho, matooke, or Ggonja (plantain).

== Ingredients ==
The main ingredients of sombe include;

- Fresh pound cassava leaves, palm oil, dried or smoked fish, one or more type of meat such as pork, beef.

Other ingredients that can be used included;

- Onions, okra, ground nuts, spinach, lenga-lenga (amaranth leaves), green pepper, red pepper,ginger, garlic, tomatoes, pumpkin leaves, salt, egg plants, banana inflorescence (Banana flowers).

== Preparation of Sombe ==
Sombe is commonly prepared by the Bakonzo. But it is also prepared by the Congolese, the Rwandese and also other tribes in Uganda.

=== Picking of the cassava leaves ===
The young and tender cassava leaves with their leaf stalks are picked from the garden at anytime of the day but it is recommended that they are harvested in the morning so that they can be sun dried for 1 to 3 hours to reduce on the sap content in them. If the leaves are not sun dried, they can be dry fried in a saucepan which is on fire to reduce the sap content in the leaves. The cassava buds and top two cassava leaves are recommended to be harvested as they are soft and will take a shorter time to get ready when cooked.

=== Mashing/pounding of the cassava leaves ===
- Before pounding the softened young tender cassava leaves, the leaf stalks have to be plucked off from the leaves themselves.
- The leaves are then washed using hot/warm water to remove small insects and snails, pupa, dust and debris.
- Then the leaves are put in an either a wooden or metallic mortar and pounded until they soften. To make the leaves soften faster, other ingredients such as yam leaves, spinach or the inner white part of the banana plant bud (that is gotten after peeling of the dark reddish-purple modified leaves called bracts that is commonly known as Banana Inflorescence or banana fruit or Empumumpu (in Luganda)) are pounded together with pounded cassava leaves in the same mortar until the mix up.

=== Cooking of the pounded cassava leaves ===
After pounding the cassava leaves, it is optional to re-wash the leaves before they are put in a boiling pot or sauce pan. There two ways of boiling the sombe and these are;

==== Cooking of sombe using palm oil ====
Palm oil is poured in a sauce pan or pot and boiled on medium heat until it is ready and water is added to it. The mixture is put on fire until the water boils. Then the pounded cassava leaves are then added to the boiling water - palm oil mixture and it is boiled for about 40 minutes to 1 hour until it is ready. When boiling the sauce pan is not covered so that the Hydrocyanic acid (HCN) evaporates from boiling pounded cassava leaves.

==== Cooking using vegetable oil ====
Sombe can be cooked using vegetable oil as an alternative to palm oil.

=== Adding of the other spices ===
Other spices such as tomatoes, garlic, salt, curry powder, vegetables, green paper, red pepper among others are first prepared separately in another pot ot sauce either by boiling or frying them. They are added to the boiled cassava leaves when the meat or fish is being added. Or they can be added about 15 to 10 minutes before adding the meat, fish or peanuts. Even raw spices such as onions, garlic can be added to the boiled cassava leaves.

=== Adding of the meat or fish or ground nuts to the boiled cassava leaves ===
==== Adding the fish ====
The smoked or dried salted fish commonly known as Makayabu has to be first soaked in warm water to reduce on the salt content as the salt will dissolve in the warm or hot water and also soften that fish.The soaked fish is then added to the already boiled cassava leaves and then it is again boiled for one hour and the result is Sombe.

==== Adding a type of meat ====
The chosen type of meat such as pork, beef, goat meat is first prepared separately before adding it in the already boiled cassava leaves. It can be first roasted, boiled and then fried until it is ready or it can be roasted and then deep fried in cooking oil. The ready meat is then added to the already boiled cassava leaves and then it is again boiled for one hour and the result is Sombe.

==== Adding peanuts ====
For the people who do not eat meat, peanuts are usually added to the sombe. They are first ground into a paste which is then mixed with water and stirred to make a syrup. When the cassava leaves are ready, they are mixed with the peanut syrup and boiled for about 40 minutes to 1 hour.

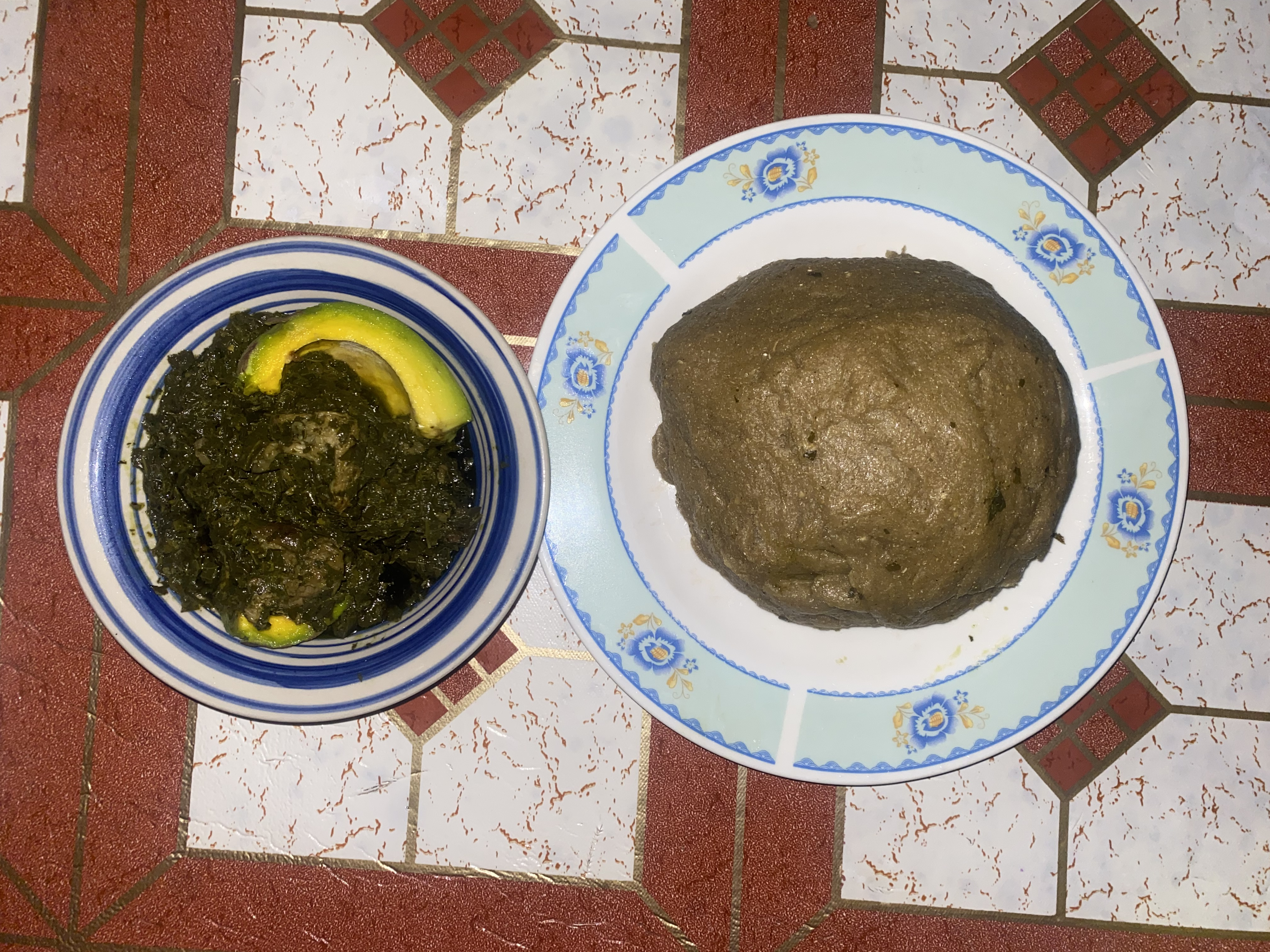
Sombe sauce served with kalo and avocado

=== Serving sombe ===
Sombe is served hot with rice, Kalo (mingled tapioca),sweet potatoes, boiled cassava, posho among other foods of ones choice.

== See also ==
- List of stews
- Eshabwe
- Malewa
- Firinda
- Kikomando
