= Malewa =

Ugandan cuisine made from smoked bamboo shoots

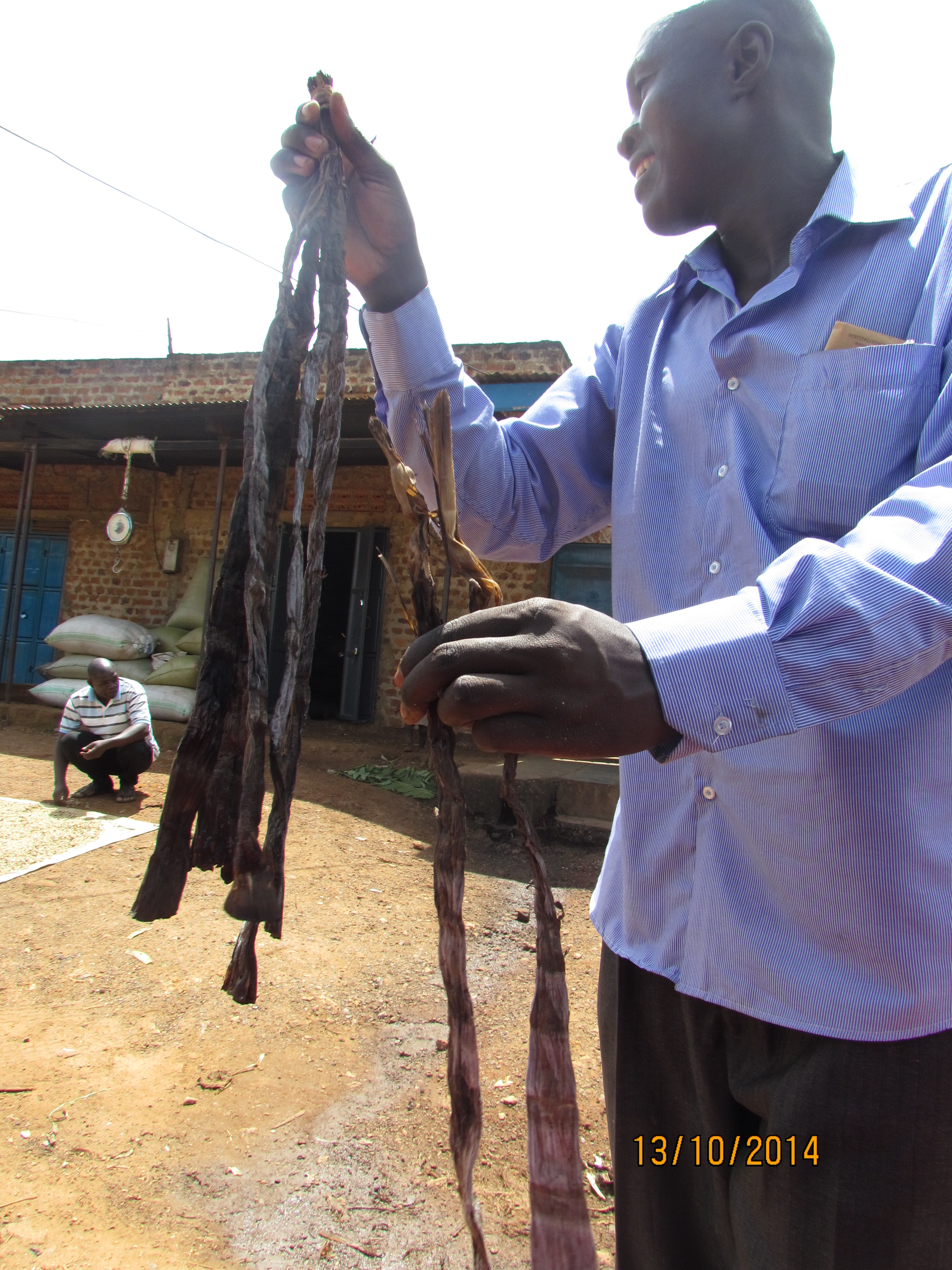
- Bamboo shoot
- Course: Main
- Place of origin: Uganda
- Main ingredients: Bamboo shoot, Salt, Rock salt, Water

Malewa is smoked bamboo shoot which is dried for preservation. The bamboo trees grow in the wild in eastern Uganda around Mt. Elgon in the districts of Bududa, Sironko and Mbale.

== Origin ==
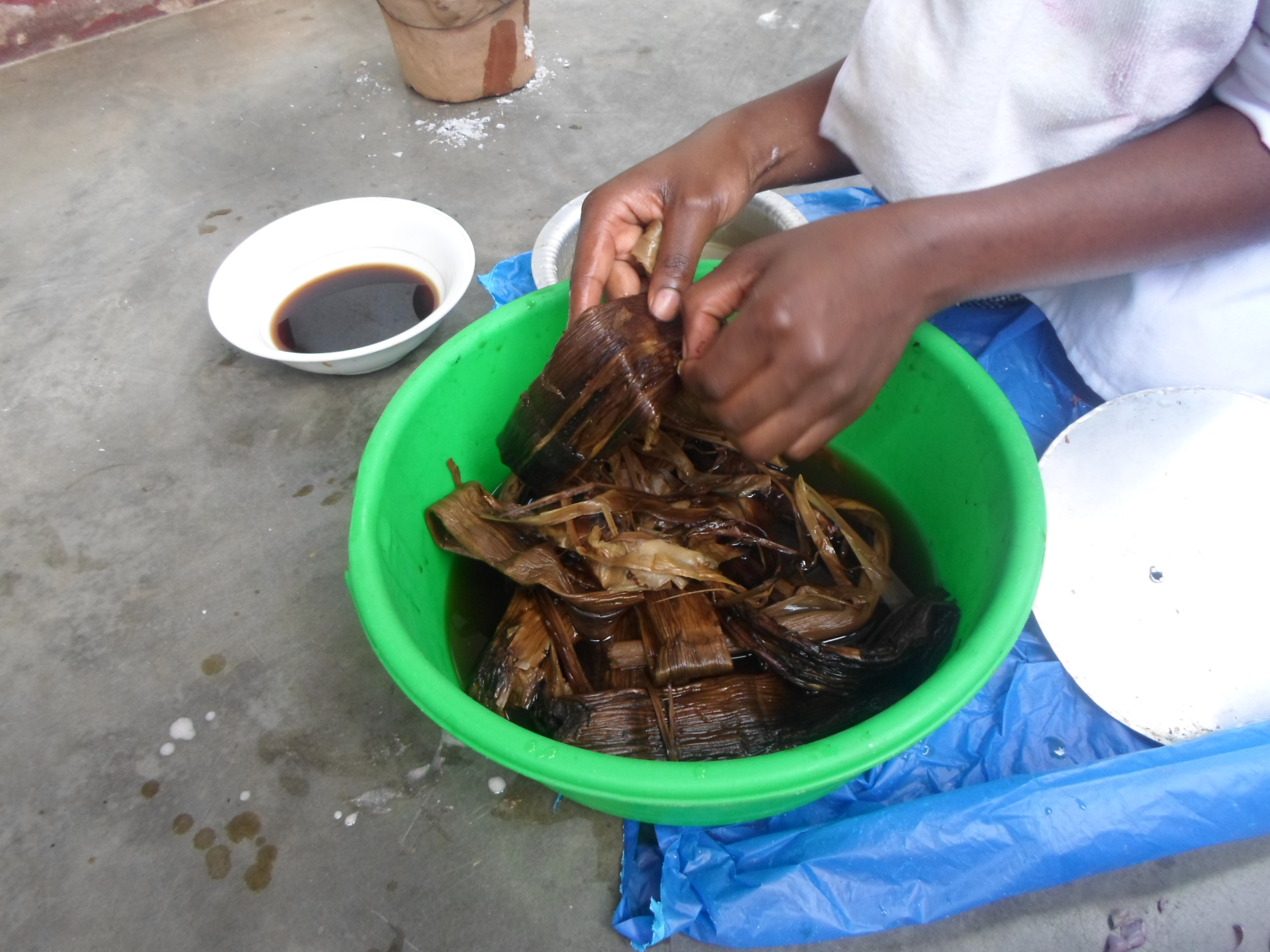
Malewa

Malewa originated from Eastern Uganda in the Bugisu sub-region. It was originally eaten as food and later it started to be cooked as a sauce when mixed with ground simsim (sesame seed) or peanuts. Malewa is a major part of ceremonies in Bugisu e.g. Mbalu (circumcision), traditional weddings.

== Ingredients ==
- Malewa
- Water
- Salt
- Peanut paste

== Preparation ==
Malewa is boiled in water to clean, soften it and then the joints of the shoot are cut off leaving the middle parts which are cut into smaller pieces. Rock salt is added to the boiled malewa to make it more tender. Finally peanut paste and salt are added and the sauce is simmered to acquire taste. The malewa sauce is served with either matooke, cassava, sweet potatoes, rice or Posho.

== Variations ==
Malewa can be served and consumed raw, steamed or boiled.This depends on native preference and ways of preparation.

== See also ==
- Sombe
- Eshabwe
- Matooke
