= Eshabwe =

Class of clarified butter

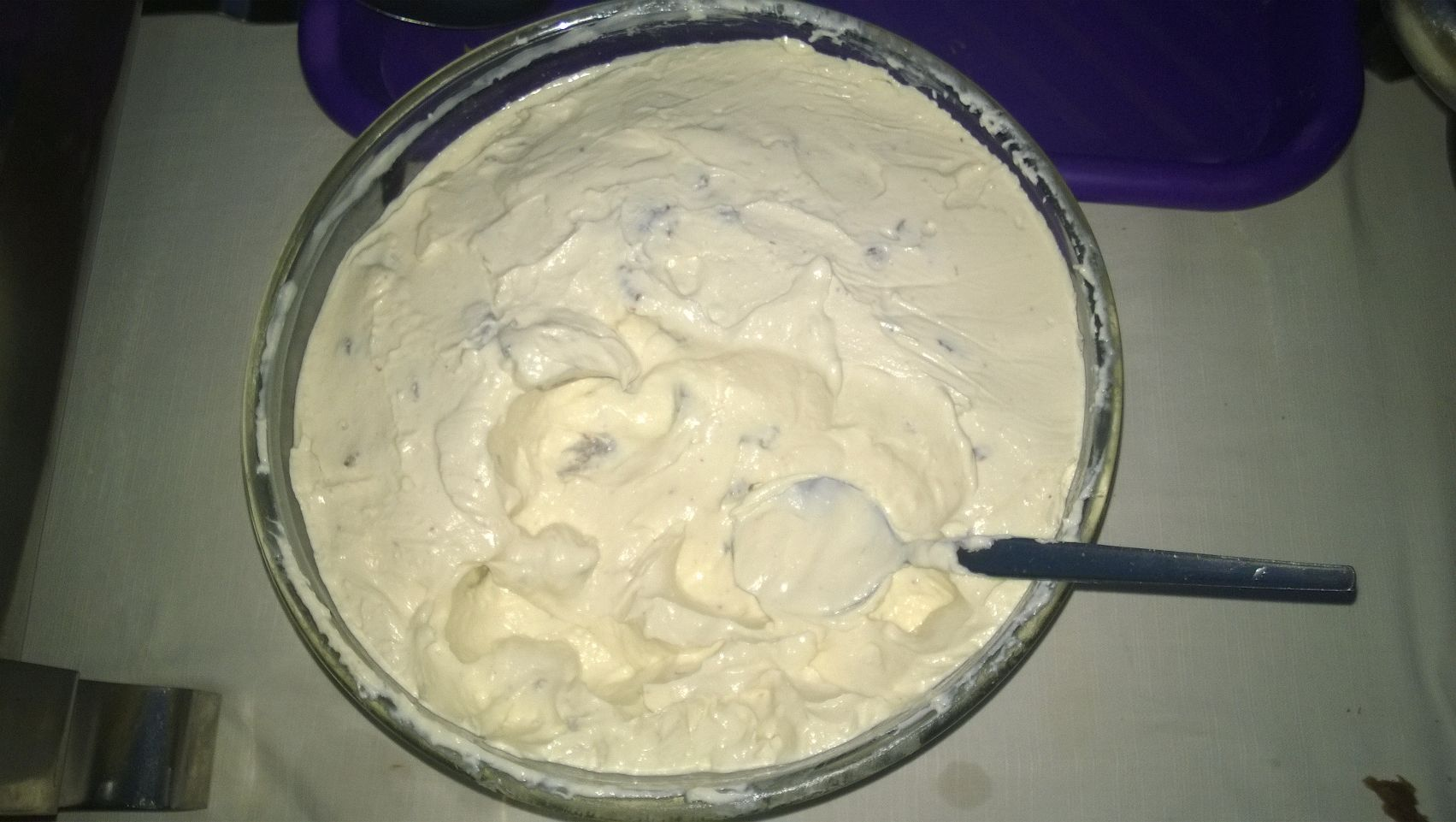
- Eshabwe
- Course: Condiment
- Place of origin: Uganda
- Main ingredients: Ghee, Salt, Rock salt, Water

Eshabwe is a class of clarified butter that originated in Ankole and is commonly used as condiment. Eshabwe, also known as ghee sauce, is a traditional dish prepared in Ankole. The dish is usually prepared for special ceremonies or occasions.

In the traditional marriage ceremonies of the Ankole community, four people taste the dish, the groom and his father and also the paternal aunt (ishenkazi) and maternal uncle (nyinarimi) of the bride. Eshabwe was served in an orwabya (clay bowl with lid). Traditionally, it was made by old women in a room where they had to be silent because it was the believed that talking would make the eshabwe turn out poor.

However, this has changed and eshabwe is served like any other dish to everyone. Eshabwe is served as a condiment with the main course meal e.g. karo (millet bread), potatoes, matooke, beans and others.

== Ingredients ==
- Ghee
- Rock salt
- Cold water
- Salt
- Meat

== Preparation ==
Initially ghee is washed clean in cold water. A mixture of rock salt and water (rwabarire) is added to the ghee. The mixture is stirred until the ghee changes from yellow to white in color. While adding cold boiled water, which has salt dissolved in it. The formed eshabwe is stirred until you get the desired thickness. After the eshabwe is formed, it is sieved to remove particles or impurities. Eshabwe is served with any main course meal e.g. millet bread, matooke, sweet potatoes etc.

== See also ==
- Clarified butter
- Schmaltz
- Ghee
- Sombe
- Dek Ngor
