= Juliet (given name) =

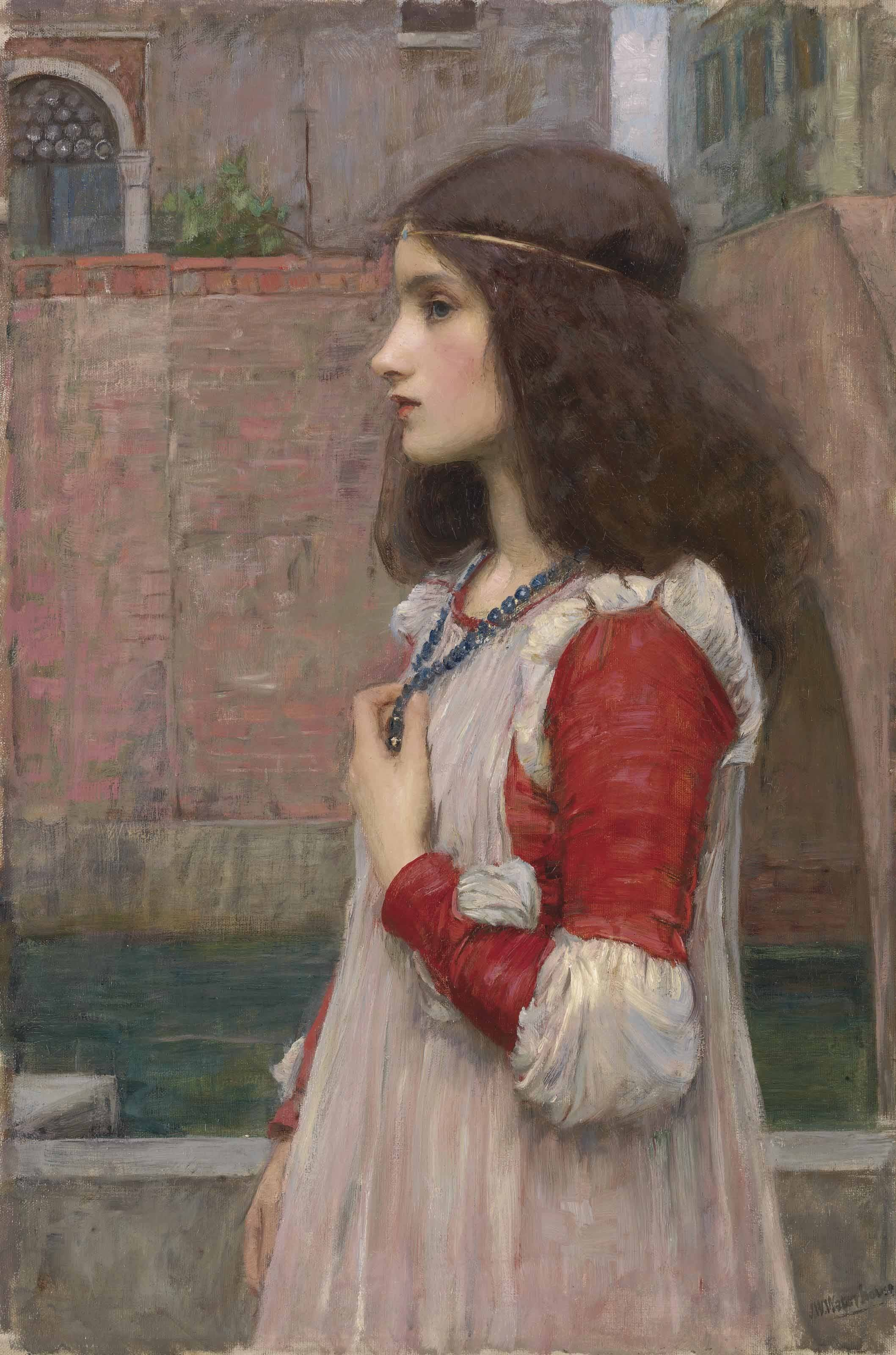
- Juliet or The Blue Necklace by John William Waterhouse, 1898
- Gender: Female
- Language: English

Origin
- Meaning: English version of Italian Giulietta or French Juliette, both diminutives of Latin Julia

Juliet is a feminine given name, an English form of the Italian Giulietta, which is a diminutive form of Italian Giulia. It is also an English form of the French Juliette, which is a diminutive form of the French Julie. All forms of the name are ultimately derived from the Latin Julia, a name which originated with the Julia gens of Ancient Rome. The name is best known in the Anglosphere as the tragic heroine of Romeo and Juliet by William Shakespeare.

== Usage ==
Juliet has seen regular use for girls born in both the United Kingdom and the United States.

== Women ==
- Juliet Ace (born 1938), British dramatist and screenwriter
- Juliet Agasha (living), Ugandan politician
- Juliet Akano (born 1963), Nigerian politician
- Juliet Alexander (living), Guyanese-born British educator, journalist and television presenter
- Juliet Appiah (born 1989), Ghanaian police officer and Ghanaian association football referee
- Juliet Asante, Ghanaian film actress, producer and director, and philanthropist
- Juliet Aubrey (born 1966), British actress
- Juliet Awwad (born 1951), Jordanian actress and producer of Armenian descent
- Juliet Barker (born 1958), English historian
- Juliet Bashore (born 1956), American film maker
- Juliet Bawuah, Ghanaian sports journalist
- Juliet Bingley (1925–2005), English social worker
- Juliet Biggs, British geologist and academic
- Juliet Blake, British-American film, television and web producer
- Juliet Bredon (1881–1937), writer; a British citizen born and raised in China who ultimately settled in the United States
- Juliet Bressan, Irish novelist and doctor
- Joan Juliet Buck (born 1948), American writer and actress
- Juliet Cadzow (born 1951), British actress
- Juliet H. Lewis Campbell (1823–1898), American poet and novelist
- Juliet Jean Campbell (born 1970), Jamaican sprinter and Olympian
- Juliet Jeanne d'Auvergne Campbell (born 1935), British diplomat and academic administrator also known as Juliet Collings
- Juliet Winters Carpenter (1948–2026), American translator of modern Japanese literature into English
- Juliet Cesario (born 1967), American character actress
- Juliet Chekwel (born 1990), Ugandan long distance runner and Olympian
- Juliet Chibuta, Zambian women's right activist
- Juliet Corson (1841–1897), American leader in cookery education and newspaper columnist
- Juliet Cowan (born 1974), British actress
- Juliet Clannon Cushing (1845–1934), American educator and labor activist
- Juliet Daniel, Barbadian-born Canadian biologist and academic
- Juliet Davenport (born 1968), British businesswoman
- Juliet Dunlop, Scottish freelance broadcast journalist
- Juliet Dymoke (1919–2001), English historical novelist
- Juliet Elu, American economist and academic
- Juliet Escoria, American writer
- Juliet Etherington (born 1979), New Zealand shooting competitor
- Juliet Floyd, American academic
- Juliet Frankland (1929–2013), British mycologist
- Juliet Fraser, British soprano, based in London and specialising in contemporary classical music
- Juliet Gardiner (born 1943), British historian and academic
- Juliet Gerrard (born 1967), New Zealand biochemistry academic
- Juliet Gilkes Romero, British stage and screen writer
- Juliet Gopinath (born 1976), American optical engineer and academic
- Juliet Greer (1871–1942), American home economist and college professor
- Juliet Hammond-Hill (born 1953), English actress
- Juliet Harmer (born 1941), English artist, children's author and actress
- Juliet Haslam (born 1969), Australian field hockey player
- Juliet Holness, wife of Jamaican Prime Minister Andrew Holness and a Member of the Jamaican House of Representatives
- Juliet Hooker, Nicaraguan-born American political scientist and academic
- Juliet-Jane Horne, Scottish model and beauty pageant titleholder
- Juliet Huddy (born 1969), American journalist
- Anne Perry (née Juliet Hulme; 1938–2023), British mystery writer who was convicted of a murder she committed in New Zealand at age 16
- Juliet Ibrahim (born 1983), Ghanaian actress, film producer and singer of Lebanese, Ghanaian and Liberian descent
- Juliet Itoya (born 1986), Nigerian-born Spanish athlete specialising in the long jump
- Juliet Kabera, Rwandan scientist and civil servant
- Juliet Kac (born 1949), New Zealand artist
- Juliet Kavetuna (born 1974), Namibian politician
- Juliet Kelly, British jazz singer and songwriter
- Juliet Kepes (née Appleby; 1919–1999), British illustrator, painter and sculptor
- Juliet Kono (born 1943), American Hawaiʻian poet and novelist
- Juliet Landau (born 1965), American actress
- Juliet Lapidos, American writer and editor
- Juliet Lee-Franzini (1933–2014), Chinese-born American physicist and academic
- Juliet Lima (born 1981), Venezuelan actress
- Juliet Litman (born 1986), American journalist, editor, and media personality
- Juliet Lyon, British director of the Prison Reform Trust from 2000 to 2016
- Juliet Lyons, American singer, songwriter, and production music composer
- Juliet Macur, American journalist
- Juliet Obanda Makanga (born 1985), Kenyan pharmacologist, neuroscientist, and medical researcher
- Juliet Man Ray (née Browner; 1911–1991), American dancer, model and muse to Man Ray
- Juliet May, British television director
- Juliet May (born 1961), British judge
- Juliet E. McKenna (born 1965), British fantasy author
- Juliet McMains, American dance scholar and instructor
- Juliet Mills (born 1941), British-American actress
- Juliet Mitchell (born 1940), British psychoanalyst, socialist feminist, research professor and author
- Marion Juliet Mitchell (1836–1917), American poet and educator
- Juliet Morris (born 1965), British television presenter
- Juliet Morrow, American archaeologist and academic
- Juliet Murphy (born 1980), Irish sportswoman
- Juliet Murrell, British set designer in the fashion, film and design industry
- Juliet Nicolson (born 1954), British author and journalist
- Juliet Osborne, British entomologist and ecologist
- Juliet Peddle (1899–1979), American modernist architect
- Juliët Post (born 1997), Dutch cricketer
- Juliet Stuart Poyntz (1886–c. 1937), American suffragist, trade unionist and communist spy
- Juliet Prowse (1936–1996), British-American dancer and actress
- Juliet Reagh (born 1964), American actress and model
- Mary Miles Minter (born Juliet Reilly; 1902–1984), American actress
- Juliet Rhys-Williams (1898–1964), British writer and politician
- Juliet Richardson (born 1980), American musician
- Juliet Roberts (born 1962), British jazz, rock, soul and house music singer of Grenadian descent
- Juliet Roper (born 1953), New Zealand management communications academic
- Juliet Barrett Rublee (1875–1966), American birth control advocate, suffragist, and film producer
- Juliet Rylance (née van Kampen; born 1979), English actress and producer
- Juliet Sargeant (born 1965), British garden designer
- Juliet Schor (born 1955), American economist and academic
- Juliet Sear (born 1974), English baker and television personality
- Juliet Simms (born 1986), American musician
- Juliet Snowden, American screenwriter, film director, and producer
- Juliet Sorensen (born 1972–73; American academic)
- Juliet Sorci (born 1979), American actress
- Juliet Soskice (née Hueffer; 1881–1944), English translator and writer
- Juliet Starrett (born 1973), American whitewater rafting world champion, entrepreneur, bestselling author, athlete, and podcaster
- Juliet Stevenson (born 1956), English actress
- Juliet V. Strauss (1863–1918), American journalist and public speaker
- Juliet Kyinyamatama Suubi (born 1988), Ugandan politician
- Lady Juliet Tadgell (née Wentworth-Fitzwilliam; born 1935), British heiress, race horse breeder, and landowner
- Juliet Taylor, American casting director
- Juliet Thompson (1873–1956), American painter, and disciple of Baháʼí Faith leader ʻAbdu'l-Bahá
- Juliet Thompson (born 1967), American rower, triathlete, and coach
- Juliet Wilbor Tompkins (1871–1956), American writer and editor
- Lady Juliet Townsend (née Smith; 1941–2014), British writer who served as Lord Lieutenant of Northamptonshire from 1998 to 2014
- Juliet Turner, British singer-songwriter
- Juliet Valpy (1835–1911), New Zealand artist
- Juliet "Julie" Warner (born 1965), American actress
- Juliet Wege (born 1971), Australian botanist)
- Juliet Wheldon (1950–2013), British civil servant
- Juliet Wilson–Bareau (born 1935), British art historian, curator, and independent scholar
- Juliet Wyers, American singer-songwriter

== Stage name ==
- Juliet Alexander (born Judith Carr; 1938–2010), American pornographic actress and adult movie producer
- Juliet Berto (born Annie Jamet; 1947–1990), French actress, director and screenwriter

== Fictional characters ==
- Juliet Capulet, the female protagonist in William Shakespeare's play Romeo and Juliet
- Juliet Burke, a character in the TV drama Lost
- Juliet Sharp, a character in the TV drama Gossip Girl
- Juliet Starling, a character in Lollipop Chainsaw
- Juliet the Valentine Fairy, a character in Rainbow Magic
- Juliet Van Heusen, a character in Wizards of Waverly Place
- Juliet Butler, a character in the Artemis Fowl series
- Juliet Hobbes, a character in The Simpsons
- Juliet O'Hara, a character in the TV dramedy Psych
- Juliet, a character in Shakespeare's play Measure for Measure
- Juliet Douglas, the alias utilized by Sloth, a character in the Fullmetal Alchemist anime series
- Juliet Nightingale, a character in Hollyoaks
