= Julietta =

Julietta may refer to:

== People ==
- Saint Julietta (died 304), Christian martyr
- Julietta Quiroga (born 1988), Argentine alpine skier
- Julietta Suzuki (born 1980), Japanese manga artist
- Julietta Vardanyan, Armenian pianist, harpsichordist, and organist

== Compositions ==
- Julietta (Erbse opera), a 1959 opera by Heimo Erbse
- Julietta (Martinů), a 1938 opera by Bohuslav Martinů

== Films ==
- Juliette, or Key of Dreams, a 1951 French film based on a play by Georges Neveux
- Julietta (film), a 1953 French comedy romance film

== Other uses ==
- Julietta, Indiana, a neighborhood in Indianapolis, US
- 1285 Julietta, a main-belt asteroid

== See also ==
- Julieta (disambiguation)
- Juliet (disambiguation)
- Juliette (disambiguation)
- Giulietta (disambiguation)
