= Joliett =

Joliett may refer to:

- Joliet (disambiguation)
- Joliette (disambiguation)

== See also ==
- Juliet (disambiguation)
- Juliette (disambiguation)
