= Musoke =

Musoke is a surname. Notable people with the surname include:

- Allan Musoke (born 1980), Ugandan rugby union player
- Benjamin Musoke (born 1976), Ugandan cricketer
- Damalie Nagitta-Musoke, Ugandan academic
- Deogratias Musoke (born 1949), Ugandan boxer
- Elizabeth Musoke, Ugandan justice of the Court of Appeal of Uganda
- Esther Majambere Musoke, Ugandan lawyer
- Kintu Musoke, (born 1938), Ugandan politician
- Maria Musoke (born 1955), Ugandan information scientist
- Mary Musoke, Ugandan table tennis player
- Nico Musoke (born 1986), Swedish mixed martial artist
- Sarah Kiyingi Musoke (born 1960), Ugandan politician
- Theresa Musoke (born 1945), Ugandan-Kenyan painter and visual artist
