= Juliette =

- Gender: Female

Origin
- Origin: Latin

Other names
- Related names: Julius, Juliet, Julie, Julia, Juliana

Juliette is a feminine personal name of French origin. It is a diminutive of Julie.

== People ==
- Juliette Adam (1836–1936), née Lambert, French author and feminist
- Juliette Arnaud (born 1973), French actress, screenwriter, radio and television host
- Juliette Atkinson (1873–1944), American tennis player
- Juliette Walker Barnwell (died 2016), Bahamian educator and public administrator
- Juliette Élisa Bataille (1896–1972), French textile artist
- Juliette Béliveau (1889–1975), French Canadian actress and singer
- Juliette Benzoni (1920-2016), French novelist
- Juliette Bergmann (born 1958), Dutch IFBB professional bodybuilder
- Juliette Bharucha, Canadian actress
- Juliette Billard (1889–1975), architect, watercolorist, designer
- Juliette Binoche, French actress
- Juliette Carré (1933–2023), French actress
- Juliette Cavazzi (1926–2017), Canadian singer and TV personality known as Juliette (Canadian singer)
- Juliette Compton (1899–1989), American actress
- Juliette Crosbie (fl. 2014 -) Irish singer and actress
- Juliette de Baïracli Levy (1912–2009), English herbalist
- Juliette Derricotte (1897-1931), African-American educator and political activist
- Juliette Dodu (1848-1909), famous heroine of the Franco-Prussian War of 1870
- Juliette Drouet (1806-1883), French actress
- Juliette Elmir (1909–1976), Lebanese nurse and political activist
- Juliette Freire Feitosa (born 1989), Brazilian lawyer, makeup artist and singer known as Juliette (Brazilian singer)
- Juliette May Fraser (1887-1983), American painter, muralist and printmaker
- Juliette Gosselin (born 1991), Canadian actress
- Juliette Gréco, French actress and chanson singer
- Juliette Heuzey (1865-1952), French writer
- Juliette Kemppi (born 1994), Finnish soccer player
- Juliette Augusta Magill Kinzie (1806-1870), American historian, writer and pioneer
- Juliette Lewis (born 1973), American actress and musician
- Juliette Lossky, Canadian filmmaker
- Juliette Gordon Low, founder of Girl Scouts
- Juliette Marshall, American actress and playwright
- Juliette Mayniel (1936–2023), French actress
- Juliette Méadel (born 1974), French lawyer and politician
- Juliette Mills (born 1945), French actress and artist
- Juliette Morillot (born 1959), French journalist
- Juliette Motamed, British actress and musician
- Juliette Noureddine (born 1962), French singer known as Juliette (French singer)
- Juliette Peirce (died 1934), second wife of the mathematician and philosopher Charles Sanders Peirce
- Juliette Pelchat (born 2004), Canadian snowboarder
- Juliette Pita (born 1964), American politician
- Juliette Récamier (1777–1849), French socialite
- Juliette Rennes (born 1976), French sociologist
- Juliette Schoppmann (born 1980), German singer
- Juliette Simon-Girard (1859–1954), French soprano singer
- Juliette Slaughter (1945–2012), English racing driver
- Juliette Thomas (born 2000), Belgian long-distance runner
- Juliette Uy (born 1962), Filipino politician
- Juliette Wells (born 1974), American author and Jane Austen specialist

== Fictional characters ==
- Juliette Barnes, in the musical drama series Nashville
- Juliette Ferrars, the main character of the YA novel Shatter Me
- Juliette Silverton, in the TV series Grimm
- Juliette, from the video game Fur Fighters
- Juliette, from the cartoon Dogtanian and the Three Muskehounds
- Juliette Nichols, from the Silo books and TV adaptation
- Juliette, a female character from the video game Omega Strikers

== See also ==
- Julia (given name)
- Julie (given name)
- Juliet (disambiguation)
