= Juliet (disambiguation) =

Juliet is a character in Shakespeare's play Romeo and Juliet.

Juliet may also refer to:

== Songs ==
- "Juliet" (Lawson song), 2013
- "Juliet" (The Four Pennies song), 1964
- "Juliet" (Modern Talking song)
- "Juliet" (The Oak Ridge Boys song)
- "Juliet" (Robin Gibb song)
- "Juliet", a song by Nana Mizuki from the album Magic Attraction
- "Juliet", a song by The Pillows from the album Runners High
- "Juliet", a song by Stevie Nicks from the album The Other Side of the Mirror
- "Juliet", a song by Sonata Arctica from the album The Days of Grays
- "Juliet", a song by LMNT
- "Juliet", a song by Cavetown
- "Hello Juliet" a song by Clarion

== People with the given name ==
- Juliet (given name)
- Juliet Agasha (living), Ugandan politician
- Juliet Alexander (living), Guyanese-born British educator, journalist and television presenter
- Juliet Aubrey (born 1966), British actress
- Juliet Cadzow (born 1951), British actress
- Juliet Cesario (born 1967), American character actress
- Juliet Frankland (1929–2013), British mycologist
- Juliet Fremont, granddaughter of John C. Frémont and wife of Henry Hull
- Juliet Haslam (born 1969), Australian field hockey player
- Juliet Huddy (born 1969), American journalist
- Juliet Hulme (1938-2023), British author convicted of murder at age 16
- Juliet Landau (born 1965), American actress
- Juliet Man Ray (1911–1991), model and muse to Man Ray
- Juliet Mills (born 1941), British-American actress
- Juliet Richardson (born 1980), American musician
- Juliet Simms (born 1986), American musician
- Juliet Stevenson (born 1956), English actress

== Fictional characters ==
- Juliet Bradshaw, the title character in Juliet's Moon by Ann Rinaldi
- Juliet Burke, a character in the TV drama Lost
- Juliet Sharp, a character in the TV drama Gossip Girl
- Juliet Dumon, title character in the TV drama Juliet (TV series)
- Juliet Starling, a character in Lollipop Chainsaw
- Juliet the Valentine Fairy, a character in Rainbow Magic
- Juliet Van Heusen, a character in Wizards of Waverly Place
- Juliet Butler, a character in the Artemis Fowl series
- Juliet Hobbes, a character in The Simpsons
- Juliet O'Hara, a character in the TV dramedy Psych
- Juliet, a character in Shakespeare's play Measure for Measure
- Juliet Douglas, the alias used by Sloth, a character in the Fullmetal Alchemist anime series
- Juliet Nightingale, a character in Hollyoaks

== Other uses ==
- Juliet, a 1954 font designed by Aldo Novarese
- Juliet cap, a form of headgear
- Juliet (moon), a moon of the planet Uranus
- Juliet (PRR) a scenery baggage car of the Pennsylvania Railroad
- Juliet (novel), a novel by Anne Fortier
- Tropical Storm Juliet, name has been used for two tropical cyclones
- Mount Juliet, Tennessee

== See also ==
- Romeo and Juliet (disambiguation)
- Joliet (disambiguation)
- Joliette (disambiguation)
- Juliette (disambiguation)
- Giulietta (disambiguation)
