= Jovah Kamateeka =

Ugandan politician (born 1954)

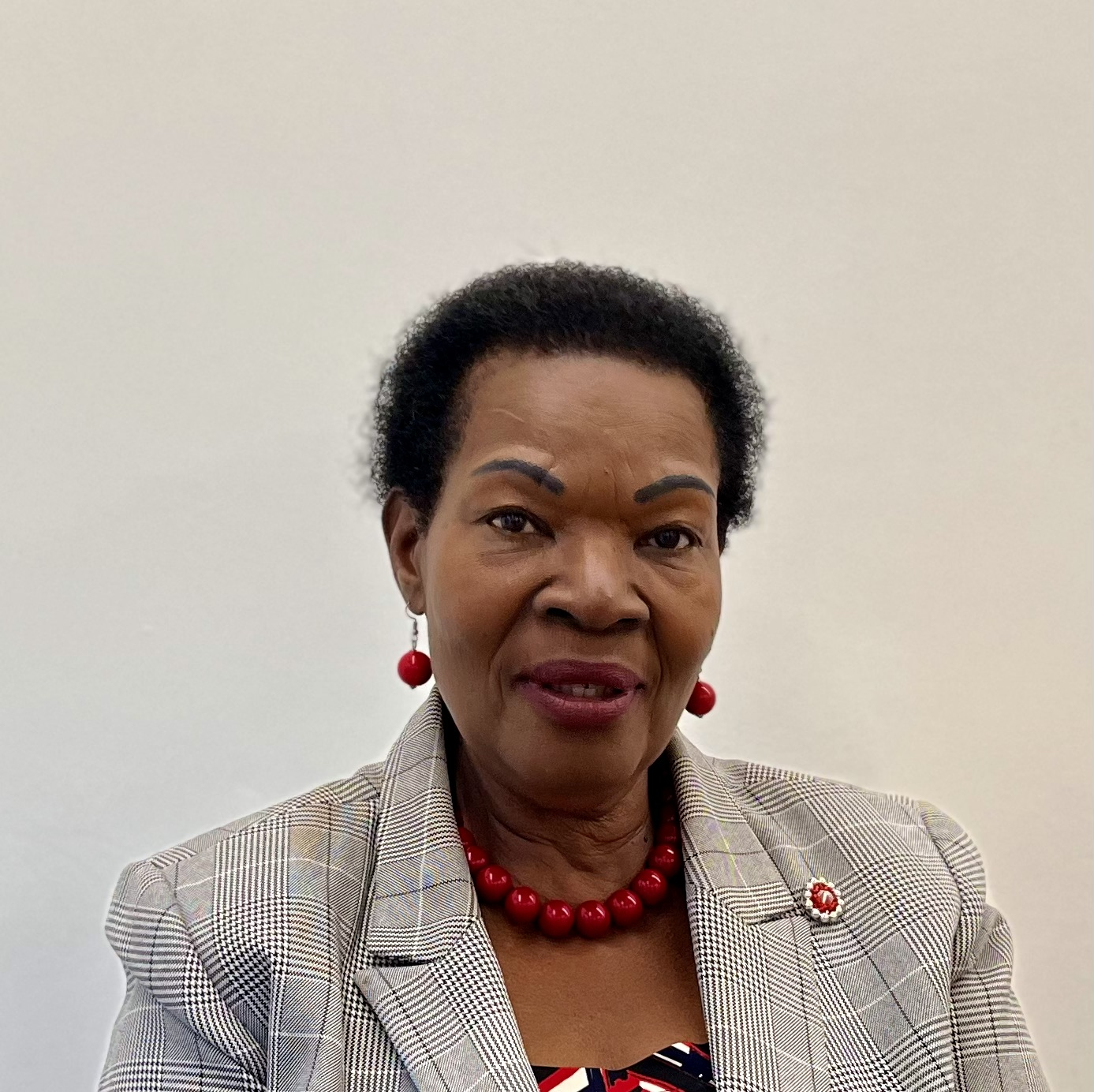
- Born: 6 March 1954 (age 72)
- Citizenship: Ugandan
- Education: Mitooma Boys Primary School; Bwerayangi Girls Senior Secondary School; Gayaza High School; Makerere University; Law Development Centre, Kampala; Uganda Management Institute; RIPA; ESAMI
- Occupations: Politician; Administrator
- Employer(s): Office of the President; Ministry of Water & Energy; Constitutional Commission; State House; Uganda Law Reform Commission; Parliament of Uganda
- Known for: Politics
- Political party: National Resistance Movement

Jovah Kamateeka also known as Kamateeka Jovah Karamagi (born 6 March 1954) is a Ugandan politician and administrator. She was the District Woman Representative for Mitooma district and affiliated to National Resistance Movement political party. In the 2021 general elections, Jovah lost to Juliet Agasha Bashisha who is the current Mitooma district Woman representative under the NRM political party.

== Early life and education ==
Kamateeka was born on 6 March 1954. In 1966, she completed her Primary Leaving Examination from Mitooma Boys Primary School and later joined Bwerayangi Girls Senior Secondary School for Uganda Certificate of Education in 1970. In 1972, she completed her Uganda Advanced Certificate of Education from Gayaza High School. She joined Makerere University to attain BA/ DIP ED (1976) and returned in 1982 to attain Master of Arts. In 1985, she was awarded a Certificate in Law (Administrative Officers Law Course) from Law Development Centre, Kampala. She later joined Uganda Management Institute in 1993 to get a Diploma in Public Administration & Management. In 1994, she joined RIPA to get a Certificate in Project Planning. She enrolled for Master of Business Administration at ESAMI and completed it in 2009. In 2010, Jovah was awarded a Masters of Management Studies from Uganda Management Institute.

== Career ==
=== Before politics ===
Between 1982 and 1988, Jovahrved at the Office of the President as the Assistant Secretary. She later joined Ministry of Water & Energy between 1989-1990 and was employed as the Senior Assistant Secretary. Jovah additionally served as the Senior Assistant Secretary at Constitutional Commission (1990-1993), and Ministry of Local Government (1993 – 1997). She worked at State House as the Principal Assistant Secretary from 1997 to 1999. From 2002 to 2010, she was the Under Secretary at Uganda Law Reform Commission.

=== Political career ===
From 2011 to 2021, Jovahrved as the Member of Parliament in the 9th and 10th Parliament of Uganda.

She served on the Professional Body as a full member at the African Association of Public Admin & Management and Common Wealth ASS for Public Admin & Management.

She was the Chairperson on the Committee on Human Rights. She additionally served as the member on the Business Committee and Committee on Finance, Planning and Economic Development. She is a member of Legal and Parliamentary Affairs Committee.

== Personal life ==
Jovah is widowed. Her hobbies are reading and meeting people. Jovah has special interests in Bible study which she does from All Saints Mitooma Women DEV ASS, Hosting home cell, and Sponsoring orphans. She is the member of University council Awist, member of diocesan council West Ankole and Chair board of health west.

== See also ==
- List of members of the tenth Parliament of Uganda
- List of members of the ninth Parliament of Uganda
- Mitooma
- National Resistance Movement
- Parliament of Uganda
- Member of Parliament
