= Juliet Chibuta =

Zambian women's right activist

Juliet Kaira Chibuta
- Born: Zambia
- Citizenship: Zambian
- Occupations: Women's rights activist; journalist
- Years active: 2000s–present
- Employer: Zambia National Women’s Lobby (ZNWL)
- Organizations: Zambia National Women’s Lobby; NGOCC; Women For Change
- Known for: Advocacy for women's political participation in Zambia
- Title: Executive Director of Zambia National Women’s Lobby

Juliet Kaira Chibuta is a Zambian women's right activist. Since 2012 she has been the executive director of Zambia National Women’s Lobby (ZNWL).

== Life ==
Juliet Chibuta was previously a journalist at Zambia Daily Mail.

In January 2015 Chibuta warned that many Zambian voters, particularly women, were being disenfranchised by restrictions on the replacement of voters' cards. In December 2015 Chibuta called for women to register to vote, citing violence as a factor inhibiting women from political participation. The ZNWL joined with Women For Change (WfC) to try to increase the participation of women in local government and national parliament. Chibuta spoke in support of Patricia Mulasikwanda, MP for Mulobezi.

In September 2016 Chibuta urged President Lungu to appoint more women to his cabinet. After the cabinet was announced, she welcomed the inclusion of more women, though warned that there was still room for improvement.

In November 2016, after media attention to cases of women killing their husbands, Chibuta called for more informed counselling and guidance services, so that women felt leaving their husbands was an option in cases of domestic abuse.

In 2020 she also chaired the Steering Committee for the implementation of the Coordinated Elections Campaign Strategy (CECS) of the Non-Governmental Gender Organisations Coordinating Council (NGOCC). In October 2020 she issued a ZNWL statement condemning police brutality directed at Ms Carol Kambwili, the wife of NDC leader Chishimba Kambwili, and her daughter.
