= Juliett =

Juliett is a variant of the name Juliet or Juliette. It may also refer to:

- The code word for the letter J in the NATO phonetic alphabet International Code of Signals and related alphabet codes
- J, or "Juliett Time", an observer's local time as a nautical time zone letter or a military time zone; see 24-hour clock § Military time
- Juliett-class submarine, the NATO moniker for a Soviet submarine, from the letter J
  - Juliett 484, a submarine in that class
- Juliett, Indiana, the former name of Tarry Park, Indiana

== See also ==
- Juliet (disambiguation)
- Juliette (disambiguation)
