= Paul Epilo =

- Born: Paul Epilo Obule a village, Soroti District
- School: Kalinabire Primary School, Kyambogo College
- University: Uganda Martyrs University, Nkozi
- Occupation: Rugby player

Rugby union career
- Position: 15s Rugby / Formerly 7s Rugby
- Current team: Heathens RFC
Senior career
Years	Team	Apps	(Points)
2013–2018	Buffaloes RFC		
2018–present	Heathens RFC		
International career
Years	Team	Apps	(Points)
2013–2014	Uganda U-19		
2019–present	Uganda		

Paul Epilo is a Ugandan rugby player who has played for both national and club teams and currently plays under Heathens rugby club. He has held leadership roles including vice-captain of Heathens in 2018 and captain of Buffaloes in 2013 and has participated in local and international rugby competitions.

== Early life and education ==
Epilo grew up in Nakawa, but comes from Obule a village in Soroti District located in Eastern Uganda. His parents are Samuel Opyem and Penina Namugere. He attended Kalinabire Primary School in Ntinda for his Primary Education, then joined Kyambogo College where he completed his Ordinary and Advanced level.

Epilo was given a bursary at Uganda Martyrs University, Nkozi through coach Allan Otim, who had previously couched him at Kyambogo College and was able to earn a bachelor's degree in Information and Technology.

== Career ==
Epilo joined the Uganda national rugby setup in 2015 but was not part of the main national team until 2019. He represented Uganda in Under-19 competitions which where held in Tunisia in 2013, 2014 in Uganda and 2014 in Zimbabwe. Epilo was also included in the Ugandan University select squad that was played in Namibia. At the club level, he began his senior rugby career 2013 with Buffaloes Rugby Club, and became captain after joining Heathens in 2018. During the game, Epilo plays 15s but used to play 7s too until 2019.

== Awards ==
- Won two league cups in the 2018/1019 and 2019/2020 seasons.

== See also ==
- Yusef Sozi
- Ivan magomu
- Allan Musoke
- Joseph Aredo
