= Kashenyi–Mitooma Road =

Public road in Uganda

Coordinates: 00°36′47″S 30°04′59″E

Route information
- Length: 7.7 mi (12.4 km)
- History: Designated in 2017; Completed in 2019

Major junctions
- East end: Kashenyi
- West end: Mitooma

Location
- Country: Uganda

Highway system
- Roads in Uganda

The Kashenyi–Mitooma Road in the Western Region of Uganda connects the town of Kashenyi in Bushenyi District with the town of Mitooma in Mitooma District. The road measures approximately 12 kilometres (7.5 mi).

== Location ==
The road starts at Kashenyi, about 4.5 kilometres (3 mi) south of Ishaka, on the road to Kagamba, along the Ishaka–Kagamba Road.

== Upgrading to bitumen ==
In 2017, the government of Uganda, hired Chongqing International Construction Corporation (CICO), at a contract price of USh49.199 billion (about US$13.5 million) to upgrade the road from gravel surface to class II bitumen surface and the building of bridges and drainage channels. The contract price included tarmacking of the access road to Katabi Seminary in Bushenyi District, measuring 0.8 kilometers, bringing the total length of the contract project to 12.32 kilometres (7.66 mi).

== Overview ==
The tarmacked road is expected to ease transport within the districts of Bushenyi, Mitooma, Rubirizi and Sheema, collectively referred to as Greater Bushenyi. The area is heavily involved in agriculture, both on a subsistence level and increasingly on a commercial level. Agriculture employs nearly 87 percent of the population of the aforementioned districts.

Crops grown in the area on a commercial basis include tea, coffee, matooke, bananas. In addition hybrid cattle are raised in the area for both milk and meat production.

== Timeline ==
Work on the road project started on 31 January 2017. Completion was achieved on 16 January 2019. The one year Defects Liability Period ended in January 2020 and the Uganda National Roads Authority (UNRA) issued a completion certificate to the contractor.

== See also ==
- Economy of Uganda
- Transport in Uganda
- List of roads in Uganda
