= Michelle Sander =

German optical engineer

Michelle Yen-Ling Sander is a German and American optical engineer whose research involves lasers and fiber optics for ultrafast photothermal spectroscopy, and studying the effects of ultrafast light pulses on matter. She is a professor of electrical and computer engineering at Boston University, with secondary appointments in biomedical engineering and materials science engineering.

== Early life and education ==
Sander grew up in Germany,, and has been fascinated by light since she was a child. She came to the US as a Fulbright Scholar, and received a master's degree from Georgia Tech in 2004, before finishing a diploma at TU Braunschweig in Germany in 2006.

She defended her Ph.D. in electrical engineering at the Massachusetts Institute of Technology in 2012. Her dissertation, High repetition rate fiber and integrated waveguide femtosecond lasers, was jointly supervised by Erich P. Ippen and Franz X. Kärtner.

== Recognition ==
Sander was named by Optica as an Optica Ambassador in 2017, as a Senior Member in 2019, and as a Fellow in 2025; her Fellow award cited her "seminal contributions to ultrafast fiber lasers and their applications in imaging, material characterization, and modulation".

She was a 2025 recipient of the Presidential Early Career Award for Scientists and Engineers.
