= Erich P. Ippen =

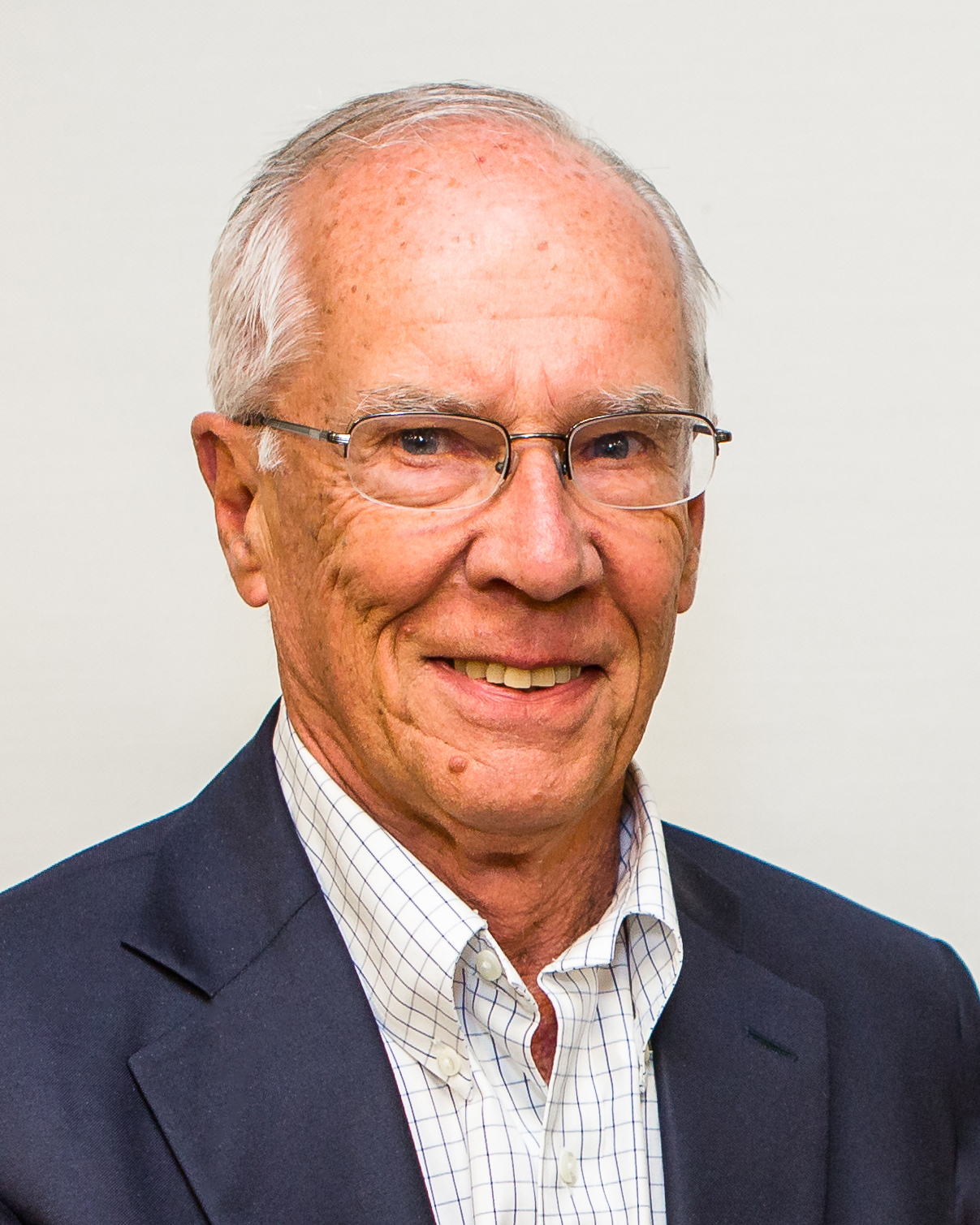
- Known for: Nonlinear optics in optical waveguides and ultrashort-optical-pulse-generation techniques
- Scientific career
- Fields: Optical Physics, nonlinear optics and Quantum Electronics
- Workplaces: MIT
- Doctoral students: Juliet Gopinath; Michelle Sander

Erich Peter Ippen is a principal investigator in the Research Laboratory of Electronics (RLE) at the Massachusetts Institute of Technology (MIT). He holds appointments as the Elihu Thomson Professor of Electrical Engineering Emeritus and Professor of Physics Emeritus. He is one of the leaders of RLE’s Optics and Quantum Electronics Group.

Ippen was elected a member of the National Academy of Engineering in 1985 for pioneering contributions to nonlinear optics in optical waveguides and ultrashort-optical-pulse-generation techniques. In 1989 he was also elected a Fellow of the American Physical Society "for his pioneering work in the generation, measurement, and application to physical systems of picosecond and femtosecond light pulses" Professor Ippen is also a member of the National Academy of Sciences and is a fellow of the American Academy of Arts and Sciences.

In 1997 he was awarded the Arthur L. Schawlow Prize in Laser Science. He was president of the Optical Society of America in 2000. He is the recipient of OSA’s R. W. Wood Award (1981), Charles Hard Townes Medal (2004), and the Society's highest honor, the Frederic Ives Medal/Jarus W. Quinn Prize (2006). Most recently, Ippen was named an Honorary Member of the Society in 2020.
