= Gillian Brown (diplomat) =

British diplomat

Dame Gillian Gerda Brown DCVO CMG (10 August 1923 – 21 April 1999) was a British diplomat who was the second woman to be a British ambassador.

== Early life ==
She was born in Wimbledon, the elder daughter of Walter Henry Brown (1893/4–1956), a Ministry of Works civil servant, and his wife, Gerda Lois Brown, née Grenside (1885–1961), an artist whose mother was Danish. Her sister was the mycologist, Juliet Frankland.

== Career ==
Brown graduated in French and German from Somerville College, Oxford just as reforms instigated by Ernest Bevin and Anthony Eden in 1943 were liberalising recruitment policies at the Foreign Office – later the Foreign and Commonwealth Office, FCO – which she joined in 1944. After service at Budapest, Washington, D.C. and the OECD in Paris, she was head of the Marine and Transport Department at the FCO 1967–70 and had to deal with the international aspects of the Torrey Canyon oil spill in March 1967.

Brown was Ambassador to Norway 1981–83; she was the second female British ambassador after Anne Warburton. In 1983 she retired from the diplomatic service and served on Civil Service selection boards and on the council of the Greenwich Forum. From 1988 to 1998 she was chairman of the Anglo-Norse Society in London which now annually awards the Dame Gillian Brown Postgraduate Scholarship in her memory.

Gill Brown was happy in Oslo: in command of her subject ... and in a country where her achievements as a professional woman were much respected. She reaped her reward when the Falklands crisis broke, and Norway became one of the first countries to ban Argentine imports (the argument that territorial disputes must not be settled by force went straight home in the only NATO country to share a land frontier with the Soviet Union). She was also held in high regard by her staff, in whose personal and professional affairs, and occasional problems, she took a practical and sympathetic interest

— The Independent

== Personal life ==
Brown was a practicing Anglican. She died suddenly at her sister's home in Ravenstonedale, Cumbria in April 1999.

== Honours ==
Brown was appointed CMG in 1971 and made a Dame (female equivalent of Knight) of the Royal Victorian Order in 1981. The King of Norway awarded her the Grand Cross of the Order of St Olav. She was an honorary fellow of her alma mater, Somerville College, Oxford, and honorary LLD of the University of Bath.

== Sources ==
- BROWN, Dame Gillian (Gerda), Who Was Who, A & C Black, 1920–2014; online edn, Oxford University Press, April 2014
- Dame Gillian Brown (obituary), The Times, London, 2 June 1999, page 21

Diplomatic posts
Preceded by Sir Archie Lamb	Ambassador to Norway; 1981–1983	Succeeded by Sir William Bentley
