= Kelly Starrett =

American physiotherapist (born 1973)

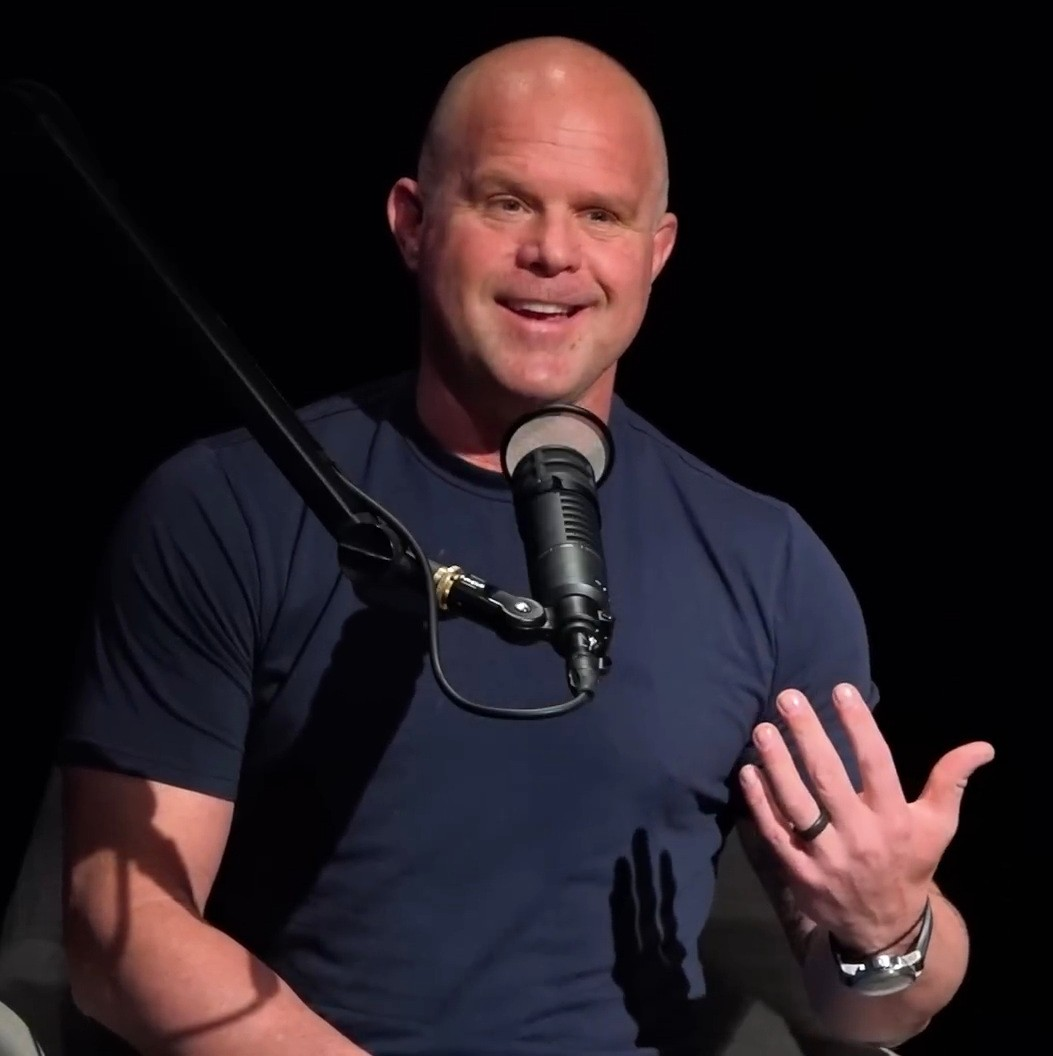
- Starrett in 2023

Personal information
- Nationality: American
- Born: 1973 (age 52–53)
- Education: Doctor of Physical Therapy, Samuel Merritt College, 2007
- Occupations: CrossFit trainer, physical therapist, New York Times bestselling author
- Spouse: Juliet Starrett
- Website: thereadystate.com

Sport
- Sport: CrossFit, whitewater rafting

Achievements and titles
- National finals: Two time whitewater rafting national championship
- Updated on 13 August 2017

Kelly Starrett (born 1973) is a physical therapist, author, speaker and CrossFit trainer. His 2013 fitness book, Becoming a Supple Leopard, was featured on The New York Times bestselling sports books list.

== Early life ==
Kelly Starrett grew up in Garmisch, Germany, where he enjoyed Alpine ski racing and kayaking. He was raised by a single mother, an American-born professor, and did not have contact with his father. When he was in high school, he and his mother moved to the United States. He attended the University of Colorado Boulder.

== Athletic and fitness career ==
Before discovering CrossFit, Starrett paddled for the US canoeing and kayaking teams. As a paddler, he won two national championships and competed in two world championships before receiving a repetitive strain injury. In 2004, he and his wife Juliet began CrossFit training, eventually opening one of the first CrossFit gyms, San Francisco CrossFit in 2005.

Starrett received a Doctorate degree in Physical Therapy from Samuel Merritt College in 2007. In 2008, the Starretts started their fitness website MobilityWOD, (renamed to The Ready State in 2019) which has been praised as a top fitness blog by Outside Magazine and other outlets.

Since 2013, Starrett's fitness career has focused primarily on publishing and continued CrossFit and mobility training. He was featured by 60 Minutes Sports in 2014 for his work on posture and mobility, and has worked with his wife on a children's fitness nonprofit in 2015.

== Writing ==
Starrett is the author of three books about fitness and mobility. Before writing full-length books, Starrett contributed articles to the Crossfit Journal, focusing on the basics of posture and gait. His first book, The Supple Leopard (2013), highlights basic mechanics and range of motion. Becoming a Supple Leopard made the New York Times bestselling sports books list, though it did receive criticism for being "a trial and error method rather than a system of standard operating procedures to diagnose and fix movement."

Starrett then released Ready to Run with coauthor T.J. Murphy in 2014. Ready to Run examines shoe choice and foot health as well as exercises to improve running biomechanics and mobility. Erin Bresini, writing for Outside Magazine, described the book as offering relief from running injuries. In his review for Breaking Muscle, Doug Dupont found the book "simple and accurate," but noted that the book "might not meet expectations" since it does not contain actual training plans.

Starrett's 2016 book Deskbound was coauthored with his wife, Juliet Starrett, and Glen Cardoza. Deskbound describes the physiological and epidemiological effects of a sedentary lifestyle. The book was precipitated by the launch of the Starretts' nonprofit, StandUp Kids, which raises money to purchase standing desks for children in schools.

== Personal life ==
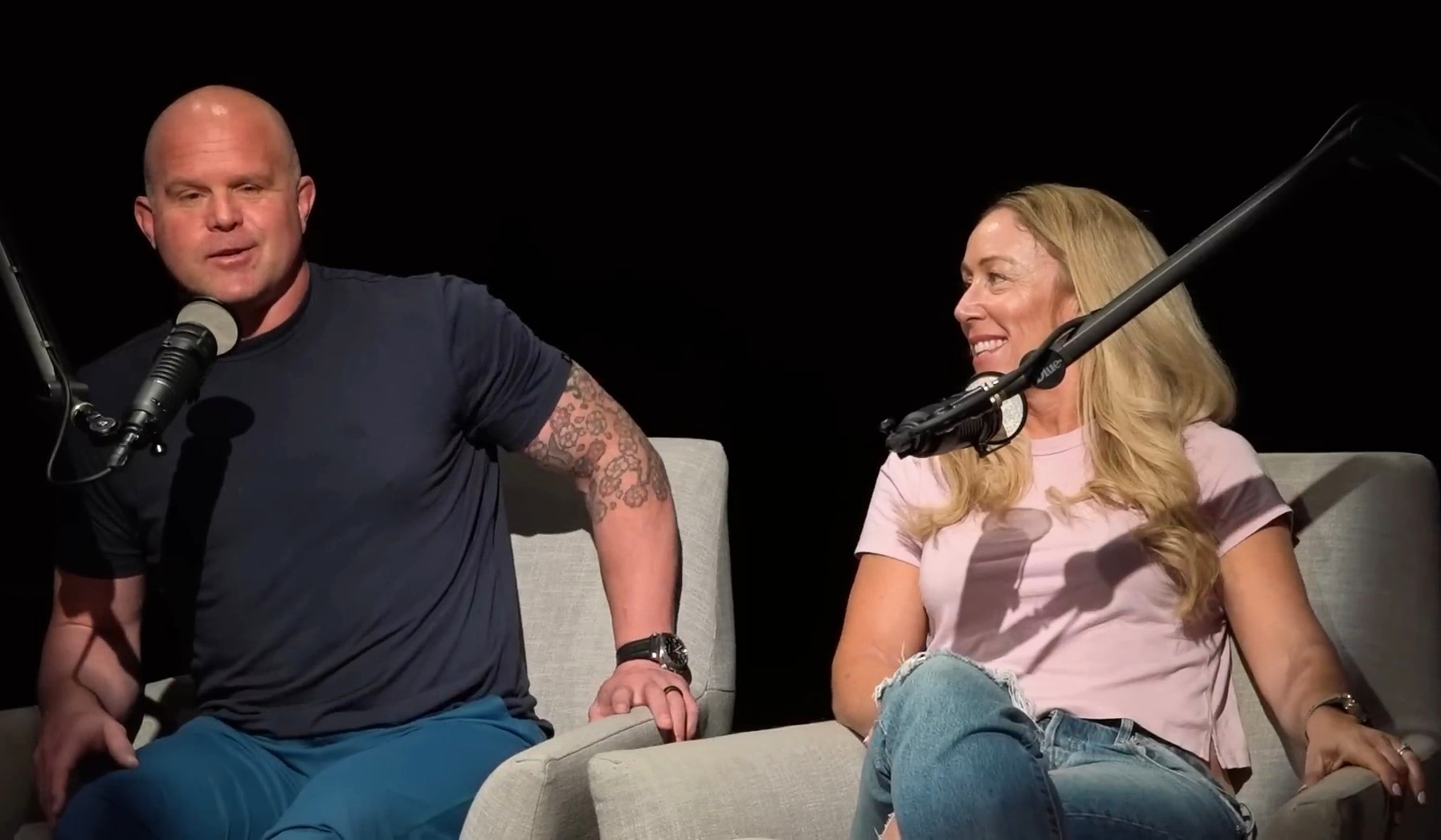
Kelly and Juliet Starrett in 2023

He and his wife Juliet Starrett have two daughters.
