= Mitooma =

Ugandan town

- Location in Uganda
- Coordinates: 00°36′54″S 30°02′42″E
- Country: Uganda
- Region: Western Region of Uganda
- Sub-region: Ankole sub-region
- District: Mitooma District
- Elevation: 5,069 ft (1,545 m)

Population (2020 Estimate)
  - Total: 6,000

Mitooma, also Mitoma, is a town in the Western Region of Uganda. It is the main municipal, administrative, and commercial center of Mitooma District.

== Location ==
Mitooma Municipal Council is located in Ruhinda County, Mitooma District, Ankole sub-region, in Uganda's Western Region. This is approximately 23 kilometres (14 mi), by road, southwest of Bushenyi, the nearest large town. Mitooma is located approximately 77 kilometres (48 mi), by road, west of Mbarara, the largest city in the Ankole sub-region. The geographical coordinates of the town are 0°36'54.0"S, 30°02'42.0"E (Latitude:-0.6150; Longitude:30.0450). Mitooma sits at an average elevation of 1,545 metres (5,069 ft) above mean sea level.

== Population ==
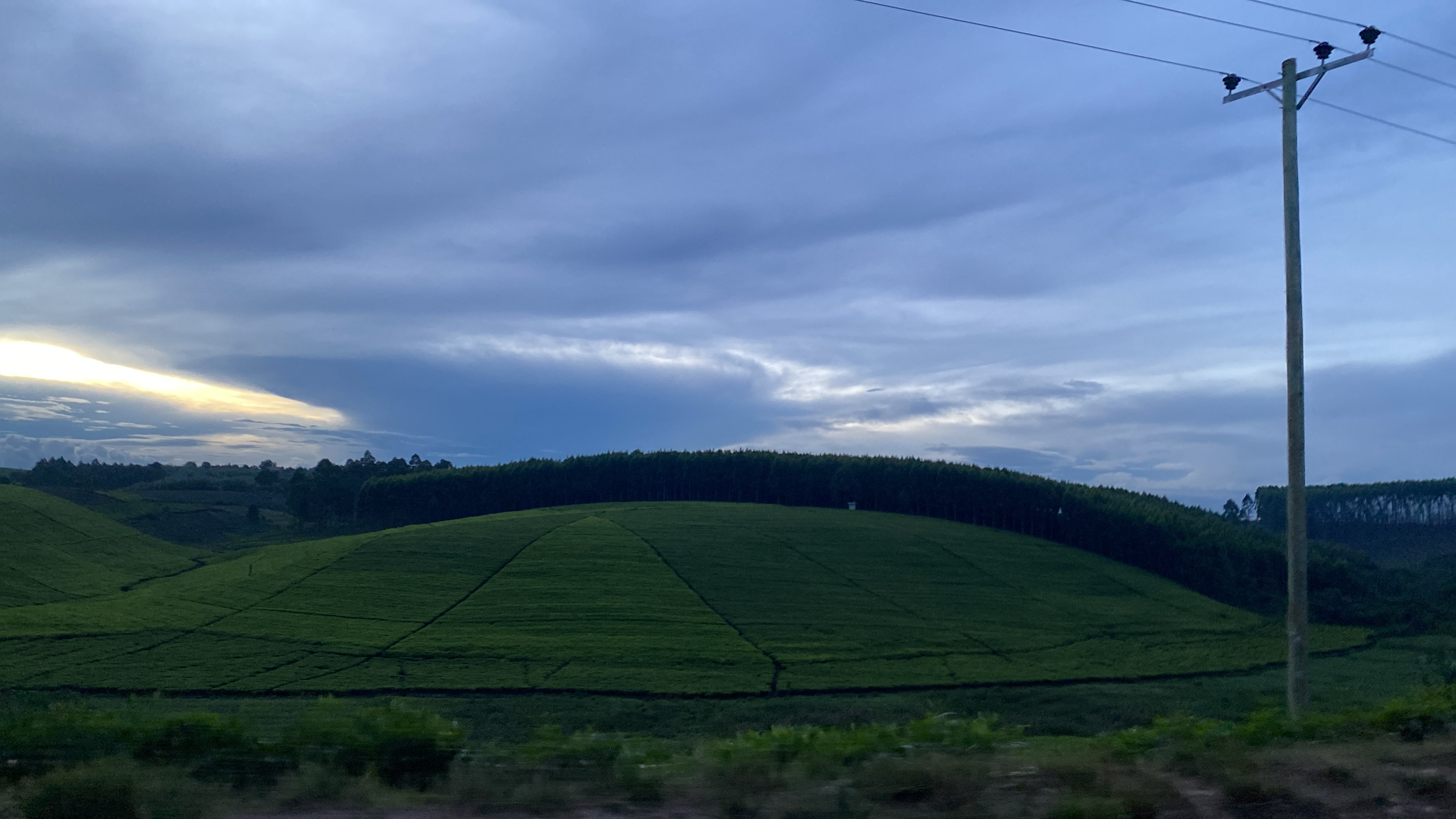
A cloudy sunset over tea leaves in Mitooma District in Western Uganda.

In 2015, Uganda Bureau of Statistics (UBOS) estimated the population of Mitooma Town Council at 5,700. In 2020, the population agency estimated the mid-year population of the town at 6,000 people. Of these, an estimated 3,100 (51.7 percent) were females and 2,900 (48.3 percent) males. UBOS calculated that the town's population increased at an average rate of 1.03 percent annually, between 2015 and 2020.

== Points of interest ==
The following points of interest lie within or close to Mitooma Town Council.

1. The offices of Mitooma Municipal Council

2. The headquarters of Mitooma District Administration

3. Mitooma Central Market

4. The western end of the tarmacked 12.5 kilometres (7.8 mi) Kashenyi–Mitooma Road, is located here.

5. The 31 kilometres (19 mi) Mitooma–Rukungiri Road, a heavily pot-holed dirt road starts here to end at Rukungiri, in Rukungiri District.

== See also ==
- Ankole sub-region
- List of cities and towns in Uganda
- Kahinda Otafiire
