= Sarah Kiyingi Musoke =

Ugandan politician

- Born: April 16, 1960 (age 66); Rakai District
- Education: Bwanda Primary School, Kalagala Primary School, St Catherine Girls School (currently Dr. Obote College), Kyebambe Girls, Makerere University, University of Nairobi
- Occupation: Politician
- Title: Minister
- Political party: National Resistance Movement (NRM)

Sarah Kiyingi Musoke (born April 16, 1960) is a Ugandan politician, a former State Minister of Internal Affairs and a former Woman Representative Member of parliament representative for Rakai District since the Sixth Parliament of Uganda between 1996 and 2016.

== Early life and education ==
Musoke was born to David Livingstone from Rakai District. She went to Bwanda Primary School before joining Kalagala Primary School. She after joined St Catherine Girls School (currently Dr. Obote College), Kyebambe Girls and then Makerere University where she attained a bachelor's degree in sociology and religious studies. She then joined University of Nairobi for her master's degree in religious studies.

== Career ==
Yoweri Museveni appointed Musoke minister of state for internal affairs in 1999. She was the chairperson of the Parliamentary Committee on Foreign Affairs.

Museveni fired Musoke from her ministerial position because she and others contradicted the position of the National Resistance Movement in the third term.

In April 2021, Musoke was said to have also initiated an online petition that was aimed at challenging the allocation of 10 billion Shillings to members of parliament, to allegedly fight the spread of the coronavirus.

== See also ==
- Juliet Kyinyamatama Suubi
- National Resistance Movement
- Eriya Kategaya
- Miria Matembe
