= Kahinda Otafiire =

Ugandan politician (born 1950)

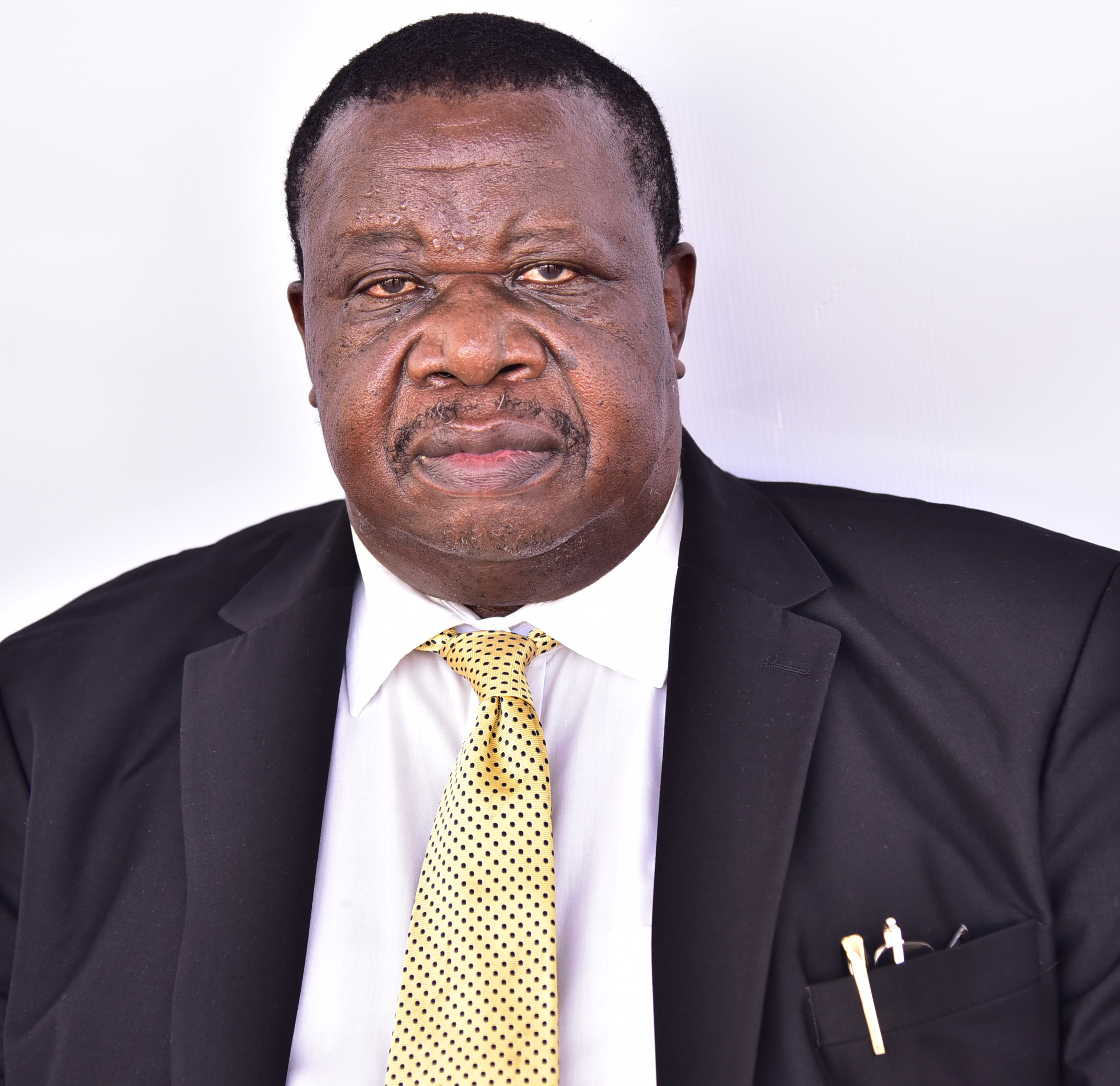
- Otafiire in 2017
- Born: 29 December 1950 (age 75); Mitooma, Uganda
- Education: Makerere University (BA in Social Science) (Certificate in French Language)
- Occupations: Military officer, Politician
- Years active: 1975 — present
- Spouse: Loice Natukunda
- Children: 11

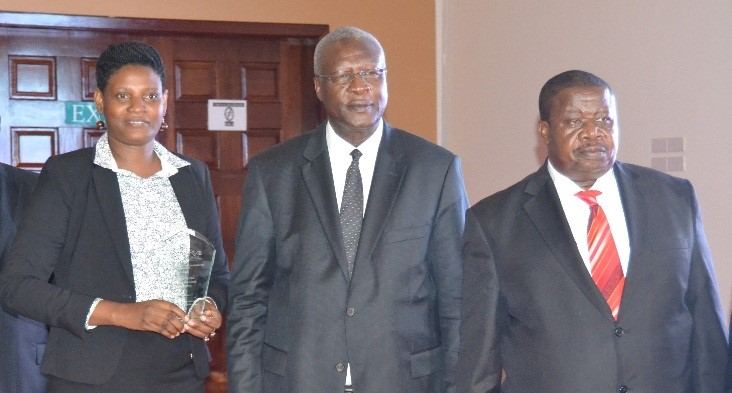
L-R Ms.Sylvia Namubiru Mukasa, Executive Director LASPNET, Hon. Bart Katureebe, Chief Justice of Uganda and Hon.Kahinda Otafiire, Minister for Justice and Constitutional Affairs at the award ceremony.

Major General Kahinda Otafiire (born 29 December 1950) is a Ugandan politician and retired military officer. He serves as the Minister of Water and Environment in the Cabinet of Uganda, having been appointed in May 2026. He previously served as the Minister of Internal Affairs from June 2021 until May 2026.

He previously served as the Justice & Constitutional Affairs minister in the Ugandan Cabinet. He was appointed to that position on 27 May 2011. Otafiire is also the elected Member of Parliament (MP) for Ruhinda County, Mitooma District in the Ugandan Parliament.

== Early life and education ==
Kahinda Otafiire was born and raised in Mitooma District on 29 December 1950. He attended Kitabi Seminary, Kahinda Otafiire holds the degree of Bachelor of Arts in Social Science. He also holds a certificate in the French Language.

== Career ==
Kahinda Otafiire first worked as a Youth Officer from 1975 until 1976. He then worked as a Foreign Service Officer in the Ministry of Foreign Affairs from 1976 until 1980. In 1981, he joined Yoweri Museveni in the National Resistance Army (NRA) guerrilla organisation, where he served as the Chief Political Commissar from 1981 until 1984. Between 1984 and 1986, the title of his job was called National Political Commissar, also in the NRA. Just prior to the NRA capturing power from the military junta in Kampala in 1986, he served as Commissioner, Internal Affairs Interim Administration, in the areas under NRA administration from 1985 until 1986.

Between 1986 and 1988, he served as Minister of State for Internal Affairs. He had to resign this position because he brandished a pistol at a woman in a Kampala bar. From 1988 until 1992, he served as the Presidential Assistant for Security. He then served as the Director General of the External Security Organization (ESO) from 1992 until 1994.

From 1994 until 1995, he served as a delegate to the Constituent Assembly which drafted the 1995 Uganda Constitution. He then served as Minister of State for Security from 1994 until 1995. From 1996 until 2001, Kahinda Otafiire served as Minister of State for Local Government. He was elected to Parliament in 1996.

Between 1998 and 2001, he served as the political head of the Uganda Military Expedition into the Democratic Republic of the Congo. In 2001, he was appointed Minister of State for Regional Cooperation, a position he served in until 2003. In that year he was appointed Minister of Land, Water and the Environment. He served in that capacity until 2006. Otafiire has also served as Minister for Local Government, prior to becoming Minister of Trade and Industry in February 2009. He served in that capacity until he was appointed Uganda's Justice Minister in May 2011.

Major General Kahinda Otafiire officially assumed the role of Minister of Water and Environment in President Yoweri Museveni’s Cabinet for the 2026–2031 government term.

He is a Member of Parliament in Uganda’s 12th Parliament, representing Ruhinda County, Mitooma District on the National Resistance Movement (NRM) ticket, representing Ruhinda County in Mitooma District of South Western Uganda.

== Family and personal life ==
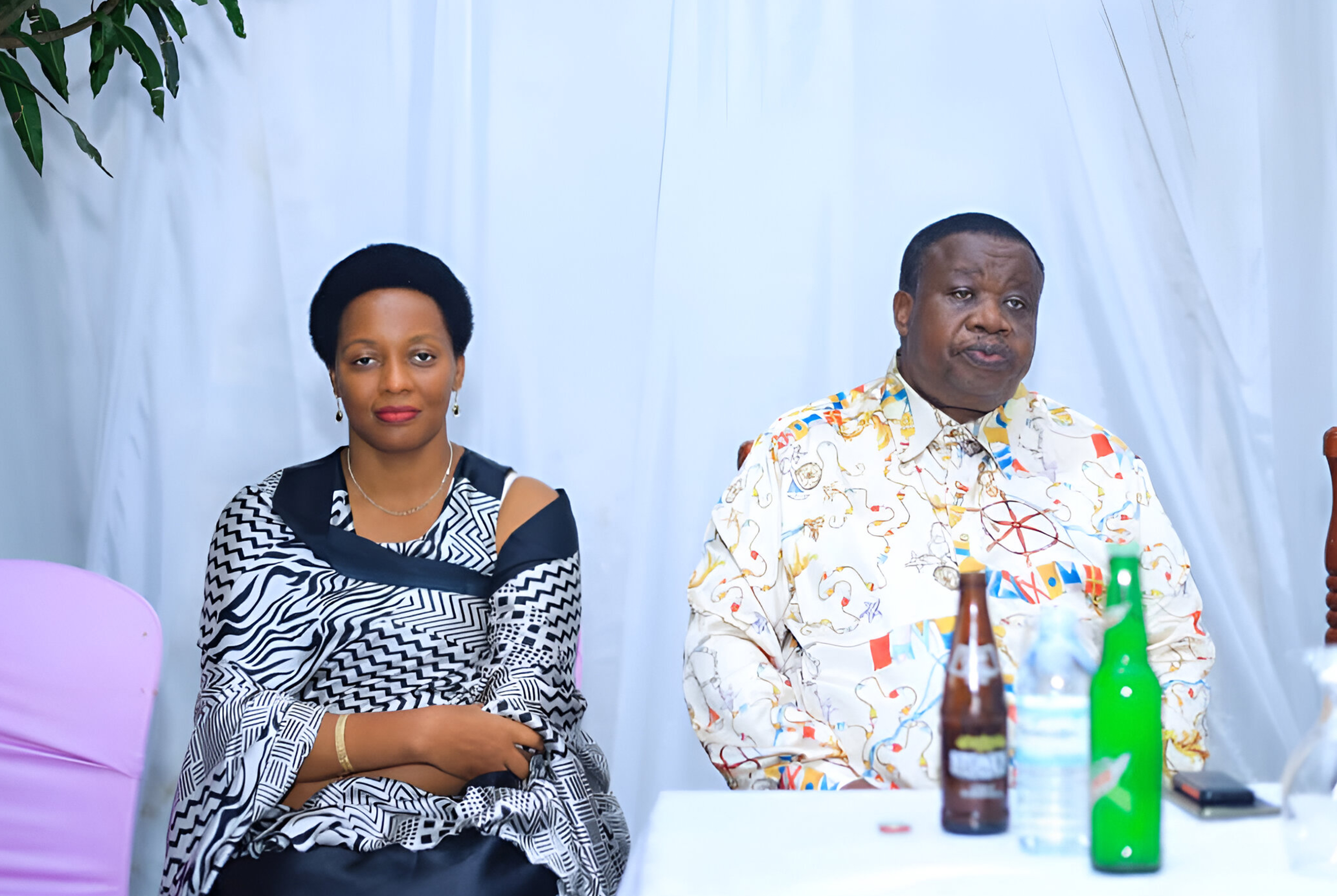
General Kahinda Otafiire and his wife Loice Natukunda attending a public function in Mitooma District Uganda, November 2024

Otafiire married Winfred Karungi in 1995 the couple had three children together before her death in February 2007 at a hospital in South Africa, following a prolonged battle with breast cancer.

He is currently married to Loice Natukunda, a social development advocate and the executive director of Elevate Her Uganda, a foundation that empowers women and the girl child.

Otafiire is publicly known to have 10 children. He is also reported to enjoy reading and teaching.

== See also ==
- Parliament of Uganda
- Cabinet of Uganda
