= Joliette station =

Joliette station may refer to:

- Joliette station (Montreal Metro), in Montreal, Quebec
- Joliette station (Via Rail), in Joliette, Quebec

== See also ==
- Joliette (disambiguation)
