= Joliette (disambiguation) =

Joliette is a city in Quebec, Canada.

Joliette may also refer to:

== Places ==
=== Canada ===
- Joliette (federal electoral district), a federal riding in Quebec
- Joliette (provincial electoral district), a provincial riding in Quebec
- Joliette Regional County Municipality, Quebec, a county

=== Other places ===
- La Joliette, a neighbourhood of Marseilles, France
- Joliette, North Dakota, an unincorporated community in the United States

== Other uses ==
- Barthélemy Joliette (1789–1850), Canadian political figure
- HMCS Joliette (K418), a river-class frigate that served with the Royal Canadian Navy

== See also ==
- Joliette station (disambiguation)
- Joliet (disambiguation)
- Juliet (disambiguation)
- Juliette (disambiguation)
