= Mulobezi (constituency) =

Constituency of the National Assembly of Zambia

Mulobezi is a constituency of the National Assembly of Zambia. It covers Mulobezi and surrounding areas in Mulobezi District of Western Province.

== List of MPs ==
Election year	MP	Party
Mulobezi
1973	Fine Liboma	United National Independence Party
1978	Leonard Subulwa	United National Independence Party
1983	Leonard Subulwa	United National Independence Party
1988	Leonard Subulwa	United National Independence Party
1991	Leonard Subulwa	Movement for Multi-Party Democracy
1996	Michael Mabenga	Movement for Multi-Party Democracy
2001	Michael Mabenga	Movement for Multi-Party Democracy
2003 (by-election)	Mwiya Wanyambe	Movement for Multi-Party Democracy
2006	Michael Mabenga	Movement for Multi-Party Democracy
2011	Hastings Sililo	United Party for National Development
2015 (by-election)	Patricia Mulasikwanda	Patriotic Front
2016	Alfred Mandumbwa	Independent
2021	Raphael Mabenga	United Party for National Development
2011	Hastings Sililo	Independent
