= Patricia Mulasikwanda =

Zambian politician

- Citizenship: Zambia
- Occupation: Politician Nurse

Patricia Mulasikwanda (born 22 September 1955) is a Zambian politician who served as Minister of Sports, Youth, and Child Development and later Minister of Gender and Women in Development. She served as the Mulobezi member of Parliament from July 2015 to August 2016.

== Education ==
Mulasikwanda holds a Certificate in Psychiatric Nursing and GCE O Level.

== Career ==
Prior to her political career, Mulasikwanda worked as a nurse.

Patricia Mulasikwanda was Deputy Minister of Sports, Youth and Child Development under President Levy Mwanawasa before being named the new Minister of Gender and Women in Development in April 2007.

Under President Rupiah Banda, Mulasikwanda did not retain her ministry after leaving UNIP for MMD. The then MMD deputy national secretary Jeff Kaande described her as a "frustrated politician." She later left MMD for PF.

The Patriotic Front central committee under the then President Edgar Lungu selected Mulasikwanda to contest the Mulobezi parliamentary by-elections in 2015. Her campaign was led by Jean Kapata. She won the election, becoming the Mulobezi member of Parliament. She ran again in 2016 but did not retain her seat.
