= Juliet Starrett =

American athlete & CEO (born 1973)

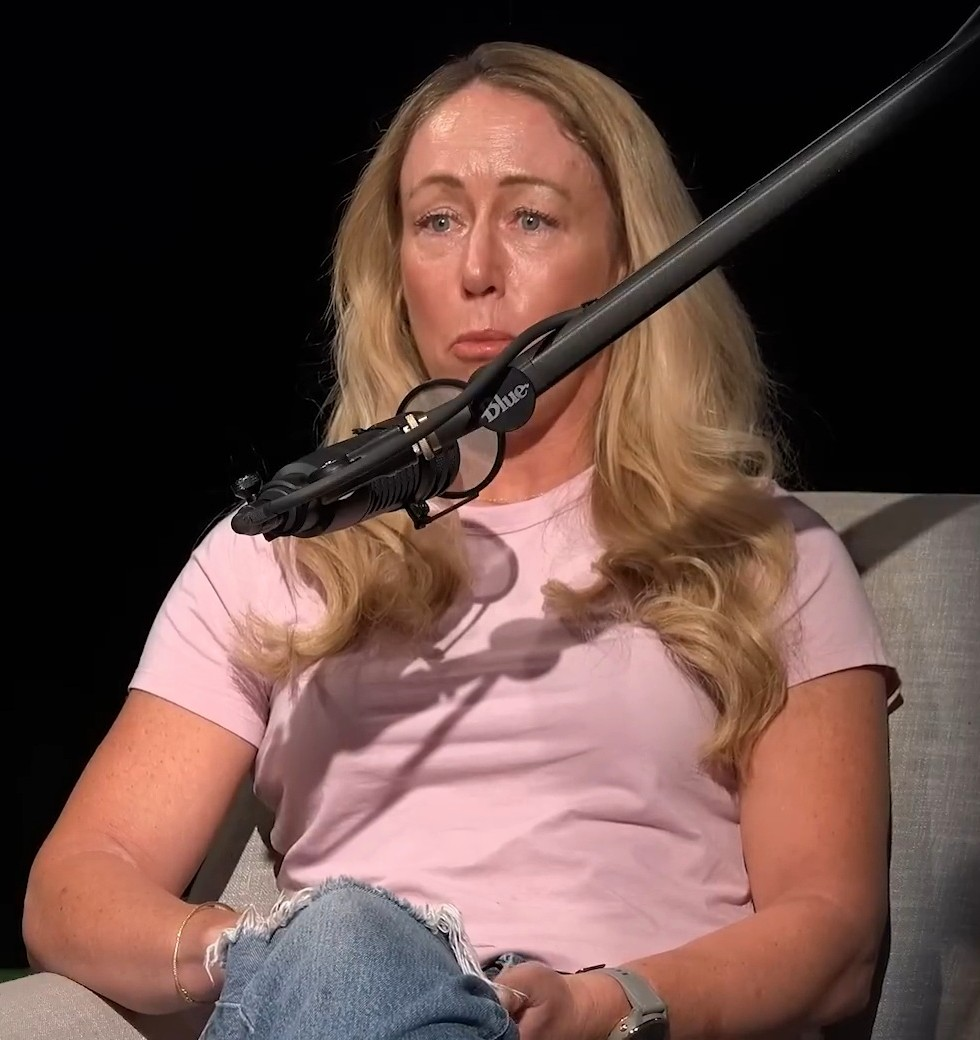
- Starrett in 2023

Personal information
- Nationality: American
- Born: Juliet Wiscombe; April 22, 1973 (age 53) Boulder, Colorado, U.S.
- Education: B.S. University of California, Berkeley, 1995; J.D. University of San Francisco School of Law, 2003
- Occupations: CEO, Entrepreneur, Author, Attorney, Athlete
- Height: 5 ft 6 in (168 cm)
- Weight: 145 lb (66 kg)
- Spouse: Kelly Starrett

Sport
- Country: United States
- Sport: Whitewater rafting, CrossFit, Rowing

Achievements and titles
- World finals: 1997 and 1997 Extreme Whitewater World Champion 1997–2000 US National Champion, Extreme Whitewater
- Updated on 13 August 2017

Juliet Wiscombe Starrett (born April 22, 1973) is a former whitewater rafting world champion, entrepreneur, bestselling author, athlete, and podcaster. She is former co-founder and CEO of San Francisco CrossFit (the 21st CrossFit affiliate founded in 2005), and co-founder of the nonprofit Stand Up Kids. She is also the co-founder and CEO, along with her husband Kelly Starrett, of the fitness website The Ready State, formerly called MobilityWOD.

== Early life and education ==
Juliet Wiscombe was born in Boulder, Colorado, and moved to Long Beach, California, with her family during high school. She attended the University of California, Berkeley, graduating in 1995 with a degree in Environmental Science and Policy & Management. She then entered the University of San Francisco School of Law, earning her J.D. in 2003.

== Athletic career and entrepreneurship ==
In high school, Juliet was the 1989 State Champion in rowing. She went on to row at UC Berkeley. As a sophomore she battled thyroid cancer, but was able to return to rowing and eventually whitewater rafting. Following college, Starrett won two whitewater rafting world championships and five national titles. While rafting, she met her future husband, Kelly Starrett, with whom she would later co-found one of the first CrossFit gyms.

After her whitewater career was over, Starrett entered the University of San Francisco School of Law, earning her J.D. in 2003. She passed the State Bar of California in 2003. In 2004, as a corporate lawyer practicing commercial litigation at Reed Smith, she and her husband opened San Francisco CrossFit. As the gym grew, she eventually quit her legal position to focus on her fitness entrepreneurial career full-time. In 2008, she and her husband started the fitness website MobilityWOD, which has been praised as a top fitness blog by Outside Magazine. In 2019 they changed the name of MobilityWOD to The Ready State.

== Philanthropy and books ==
In 2015, Starrett co-founded the nonprofit StandUp Kids to raise awareness about the scourge of sedentarism among children and the importance of moving more, and to raise money for standing desks for schoolchildren. The nonprofit has been confronted by doubts from parents and teachers about fatigue and restlessness, but reviews of early implementation by CNN and NBC News were positive. Remaining concerns about the nonprofit—and standing desks in general—center on the high cost of the desks. In 2015, StandUp Kids converted Vallecito Elementary School in San Rafael to an entirely standing school, the first of its kind in the nation. The school received nationwide media attention from NBC, CBS, The Today Show, and ESPN for the innovative and simple approach to helping kids move more throughout their days.

Starrett, her husband, and Glen Cardoza co-authored the Wall Street Journal bestselling book Deskbound. The book describes the effects of prolonged sitting and a sedentary lifestyle.

She is also the co-author of the book Built to Move, a guide for health and longevity in the era of technology dependence and sedentary living. After decades spent working with professional athletes, Olympians, and Navy Seals, the Starretts shifted their focus to the “ordinary” American and how they can all, regardless of interest level in sports, income level, and other circumstances, continue to feel good in their bodies and function well as they age. Built to Move is the fruition of this herculean undertaking. It describes practices and principles that can help counteract the negative effects of technology reliance, sedentary living, and other modern experiences.

== Personal life ==
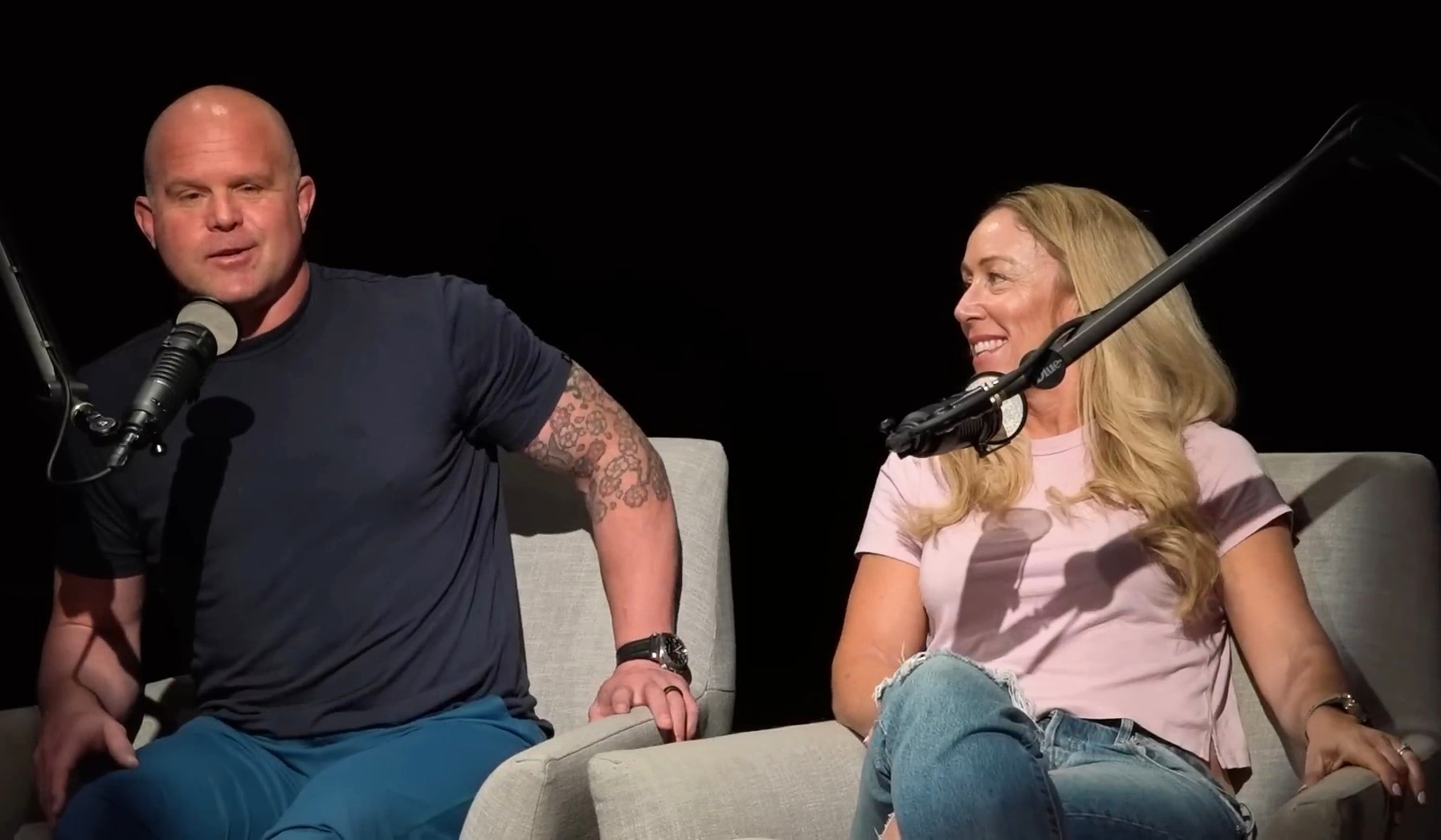
Kelly and Juliet Starrett in 2023

She and her husband Kelly Starrett have two daughters.
