= Damalie Nagitta-Musoke =

Ugandan academic

Doctor Damalie Naggita-Musoke
- Born: Uganda
- Citizenship: Uganda
- Education: Makerere University (Bachelor of Laws); Law Development Centre (Diploma in Legal Practice); University of Nottingham (Master of Laws); University of Wisconsin (Doctor of Philosophy)
- Occupations: Lawyer, Academic and Human rights activist
- Known for: Law and Human rights
- Title: Professor of Law at Makerere University School of Law

Esther Damalie Nagitta-Musoke (Esther Damalie Naggita-Musoke) is a Ugandan academic, and served as the dean and acting principal of the school of law at Makerere University, in Uganda, for close to five years, from 2012 until 2017. She was preceded by Professor Ben Twinomugisha and succeeded by Dr. Christopher Mbaziira. She is also an Advocate of the Courts of Judicature in Uganda and partner in the Law Chambers of Mubiru-Musoke, Musisi & Co. Advocates.

== Education ==
Naggita-Musoke received her Bachelor of Laws from Makerere University with honours and her Master of Laws from the University of Nottingham. She received her PhD from the University of Wisconsin Law School where she did her dissertation on the legal rights of persons with disabilities in rural Uganda. She also has a Certificate in the Human Rights of Women from the European University Center for Peace Studies in Stadtschlaining, Austria, and a Postgraduate Diploma in Legal Practice from the Law Development Centre in Kampala.

== Academic career ==
In 1993 Nagitta-Musoke joined the School of Law of Makerere University in the Department of Law and Jurisprudence. She teaches and has research interests which include International Humanitarian Law, International Commercial law (especially Finance and Security) and Law of Evidence and Agency. Her writings have mainly been in the area of human rights, specifically women's rights in conflict areas and the plight of the disabled. Naggitta-Musoke has been a visiting professor at the Global Legal Studies Center of the University of Wisconsin–Madison. Since 2012, she has been the dean of the School of Law at Makerere University. She is currently the Law & Jurisprudence member on the editorial committee for the East African Journal of Peace and Human Rights.

== See also ==
- Sylvia Tamale
- Zahara Nampewo

== Selected publications ==
- Naggita, Esther Damalie (2000). "Why men come out ahead: the legal regime and the protection and realization of women's rights in Uganda". East African Journal of Peace and Human Rights. 6 (1): 34–65.
- Naggita, Esther Damalie (2000). "Women's Rights are Human Rights". East African Journal of Peace and Human Rights. 6 (2): 268–273.
- Naggita-Musoke, Esther Damalie (2001). "The Beijing Platform for Action: a review of progress made by Uganda (1995-2000)". East African Journal of Peace & Human Rights. 7 (2): 256–282.
- The State and Law: The Case for the Protection of Persons with Disabilities in Uganda. Dissertation. University of Wisconsin Law School. 2012.
