= Juliet Murrell =

British set designer

Juliet Murrell is a British set designer in the fashion, film and design industry who qualified as a yoga instructor in 2011 to restore her health, which had been depleted by post-viral chronic fatigue. She is the founder of Voga, which combines yoga and voguing. Murrell said that watching the 1990 documentary Paris is Burning gave her the idea for Voga.

Voga has been involved in collaborations with Parisian fashion house Colette, Vita Coco, H&M, Louis Vuitton, American Apparel, Stylist, Gymbox and Style Sportif. Murrell has also run sessions with the Soho House Group as well as UK festivals such as Lovebox, Bestival and Secret Garden.

Voga sessions often use 1980s pop music such as Madonna, Janet Jackson and Prince, along with live DJs including Deanne Oliver Evans aka Blonde Ambition, Matthew Iovane and Malin Linnea. Murrell has also held Voga retreats in Ibiza and Goa.
