= Juliette Pita =

Juliette Pita (born 1964 on Erromango - death 29 March 2025) is a Vanuatian artist. She is the first artist on Erromango, in the Pacific island nation of Vanuatu, to make a living from her art and she is the first Ni-Vanuatu to master the technique of painting on tapa bark fabric. She paints on canvas, tapas and carpets. She draws her inspiration from the environment of her homeland. She has worked with the Nawita Association and has had exhibitions with various artists since 1994 in Australia, New Caledonia, Switzerland, England and France. She gained international fame with her painting Pam II , which served as the cover image for the World Day of Prayer 2021. In it she processed her experiences after the devastating Cyclone Pam.

She is the mother of Erromango artist Amelia Lovo.
