= Juliet Bredon =

Chinese author (c. 1881–1937)

Juliet Bredon, also known as Juliet Lauru (c. 1881 – 12 December 1937), was a writer. She lived in China for many years and wrote about her experiences there.

== Biography ==
Bredon grew up in China in the late 19th century. Enrolled in both English and Chinese tutoring, she articulately has described Chinese customs, rituals and daily life in her many books. Her father, Sir Robert Edward Bredon, and her uncle, Sir Robert Hart, were inspectors in the Chinese Imperial Maritime Customs Service. Her mother was Lily V Banks. Her parents married on September 3, 1879, in San Francisco. A passenger list of Sacramento Daily Union 18 July 1882 lists Robert E Bredon, wife, child and maid with a destination of China. She lived through the Boxer Rebellion and wrote an article about the experience titled A Lady Besieged in Peking. She also wrote numerous articles such as the 1921 article "The People of the Wilderness" for National Geographic under the pen name of Adam Warwick.

She married Charles Henry Lauru, of Beijing. She immigrated to the US in 1924 with her husband. She died on 10 December 1937 in San Francisco. In 1939 her Beijing estate, valued at $3,000, was put up for sale.

Her husband Charles Lauru died in Victoria, British Columbia, in 1944

== Publications ==
- Bredon, Juliet, A Lady in Besieged Pekin, The Wide World Magazine, London, 1901.
- Bredon, Juliet, Sir Robert Hart, London, 1909, 1st edition; London, 1910, 2nd edition.
- Bredon, Juliet, Peking: A Historical and Intimate Description of its Chief Places of Interest, Shanghai, 1920, 1st edition; Shanghai, 1922, 2nd edition, revised and enlarged; and Shanghai, 1931, 3rd edition, revised and enlarged.
- Warwick, Adam, pen name of Bredon, Juliet, The People of the Wilderness, National Geographic, 1921.
- Bredon, Juliet, Chinese Shadows (Child songs), Shanghai, 1922.
- Warwick, Adam, "By Motor Across The Gobi Desert." Travel. Vol. 42, No. 4. February 1924.
- Bredon, Juliet, The Moon Year - A Record of Chinese Festivals and Customs, Shanghai, 1927.
- Bredon, Juliet, Chinese New Year Festivals, Shanghai, 1930.
- Bredon, Juliet, Hundred Altars, Shanghai, 1934.
