= Juliet Kabera =

Rwandan environmentalist

- Born: August 25, 1978 (age 47)
- Education: Makerere University (BS); African Leadership University (MBA); Jomo Kenyatta University of Agriculture and Technology (MPH)
- Occupations: Environmentalist, Civil Servant
- Employer: Rwanda Environment Management Authority
- Children: 3

Juliet Kabera is a Rwandan environmentalist and civil servant, who currently serves as the Director General of the Rwanda Environment Management Authority. Appointed in 2020, Kabera had previously held the role of Director General of Environment and Climate Change at the Ministry of Environment.

== Education ==
Kabera graduated in 2002 with a BA in Science, majoring in Biochemistry, from Makerere University. In June 2020 she received an MBA in Conservation from the African Leadership University, as well as a Master of Public Health from Jomo Kenyatta University of Agriculture and Technology.

== Career ==
Appointed in 2020 as Director General of the Rwanda Environment Management Authority, Kabera had previously held the role of Director General of Environment and Climate Change at the Ministry of Environment. From 2019 to 2020 she was the Chair of the Executive Committee of the Multilateral Fund of the Montreal Protocol.

In 2022, Kabera was the national representative at 5th UN Environment Assembly (UNEA), drawing up draft legislation for the elimination of plastics. She has spoken in favour of a global plastics treaty, as well as on the importance on waste sorting for recycling. At COP28 she again advocated for a global treaty to eliminate plastic waste. She has also called for further investment in clean air initiatives in Rwanda.

The New Times described her in 2023, saying that her leadership "contributed to Rwanda's efforts in combating climate change and promoting sustainable environmental management".
