= Joliet =

Joliet or Jolliet may refer to:

== People ==
- Louis Jolliet (1645–1700), French-Canadian explorer of North America
- Oscar Joliet (1878–1969), Belgian scholar-priest and Catholic Auxiliary bishop of Ghent

== Places in the United States ==
- Joliet, Illinois, a city named after Louis Jolliet, seat of Will County
  - Joliet Correctional Center, a former prison in the city
  - Joliet Gateway Center, a Metra and Amtrak station in Joliet, Illinois
  - Joliet Union Station, a former train station in Joliet
- Joliet Township, Will County, Illinois
- Joliet, Montana, a town
- Joliet Township, Platte County, Nebraska
- Joliet, Texas, an unincorporated community

== Schools ==
- Joliet Junior College, Joliet, Illinois, a public community college
- Joliet Central High School, Joliet, Illinois
- Joliet Catholic Academy, a coed Catholic high school in Joliet, Illinois

== Other uses ==
- Joliet Chargers, a former football franchise based in Joliet, Illinois
- Joliet Slammers, a baseball team in based Joliet, Illinois
- Joliet Army Ammunition Plant, Will County, Illinois, a former United States Army arsenal
- Joliet Bridge, near Joliet, Montana, on the National Register of Historic Places
- "Joliet", a song by Andy Prieboy from the album ...Upon My Wicked Son
- "Joliet" Jake Blues (John Belushi), member of the Blues Brothers band
- Joliet (file system), an extension to the ISO 9660 specification, written by Microsoft

== See also ==
- Juliet (disambiguation)
- Juliette (disambiguation)
- Joliette (disambiguation)
