= African Leopards =

African rugby union representative team

The African Leopards are an African rugby union representative team, organised by the Confederation of African Rugby (CAR). The side will play an important role in promoting rugby in Africa. The Leopards are the first ever Pan-African representative rugby union team.

== History ==
The concept came about in 2005, and the team played their first ever match against the South African Students on July 23 at Ellis Park. It was a curtain raiser to the second Mandela Challenge Plate match between the Springboks and Australia. The team for the inaugural match was represented by Botswana, Cameroon, Kenya, Madagascar, Morocco, Namibia, Senegal, South Africa, Tanzania, Tunisia, Uganda and Zambia. Zimbabwe and Côte d'Ivoire were not included as they were playing a 2007 World Cup qualifying match. The students ran out to a 12 to nil lead after five minutes, the Leopards lost the match but clawed their way back to reach a 15 to 30 final score.

In their first overseas tour they beat the British Army Senior XV 20 to 10 at Aldershot on 23 November 2006. The match was part of the Army Rugby Union's (1906–2006) centenary celebrations.

== Results ==
Scorers:

For South African Students: Tries: Spies, Matsaung, Olivier, Booysen Cons: Gallinetti 2 Pens: Gallinetti 2

For the African Leopards: Tries: Lloyd, Duvenhage Con: Sargos Pen: Sargos

SA Students: 15 Michael Gallinetti (Nelson Mandela Metropolitan University), 14 Pierre Spies (Tukkies), 13 Lafras Uys (Tukkies), 12 Thabang Molefe (TUT), 11 Mpho Matsaung (TUT), 10 Naas Olivier (Pukke), 9 Mthunzi Mashalaba (University of the Western Cape), 8 Nelis Nel (Pukke), 7 Craig Kleu (UCT), 6 Frikkie Maartens (Johannesburg), 5 Gerhard Mostert (Pukke), 4 Bosman Grobler (Tukkies), 3 Nico de Villiers (Maties), 2 Louwtjie Louw (Shimlas), 1 Kalafo Tlaitane (Tukkies). Replacements: 16 Henoe Stoffberg (Maties), 17 Brendan Booysen (CPUT), 18 Michael Killian (Nelson Mandela Metropolitan University), 19 Damien Cloete (CPUT), 20 Henry Grimes (TUT), 21 Tembelani Mayosi (UCT), 22 Pellow van der Westhuizen (Nelson Mandela Metropolitan University).

African Leopards: 15 Steeve Sargos (Senegal), 14 Allan Musoke (Uganda), 13 Hicham Housni (Morocco), 12 Hendrik Meyer (Namibia), 11 Hary Nirina Jacquot (Madagascar), 10 Morné Steyn (SA), 9 Ismaeel Dolley (SA), 8 Abdel Boutati (Morocco), 7 Jean-Emmanuel Bahoken (Cameroon), 6 Jan Hendrik Duvenhage (Namibia), 5 Yogan Correa (Senegal), 4 John Lloyd (Tanzania), 3 Arnauld Tchoungong Kamga (Cameroon), 2 Jalil Narjissi (captain) (Morocco), 1 Heinke van der Merwe (SA). Replacements: 16 Jeremy Desai (SA), 17 Harry Vermaas (SA), 18 Cliff Milton (SA), 19 Neorgeyundo Armitage (Zambia), 20 Ryan de la Harpe (Namibia), 21 Innocent Simiyu (Kenya), 22 Kais Aissa (Tunisia).

Referee: Deon van Blommestein (Western Province)

=== British Army Senior XV ===
- November 23, 2006 Leopards 20-10 British Army Senior XV, Aldershot Military Stadium, Aldershot.

Tries were scored for the Leopards by the Captain, the lock from Tanzania, John Lloyd and by the scrumhalf from Morocco, Jawad. The flyhalf from Namibia Emile Wessels went on to convert two conversions and scored a further two penalties. Malcolm Roberts scored the army's sole try which was converted by Mark Honeybun.

The score of this match is also listed as 20-12. Perhaps the Army scored two tries and converted one of them?

Teams:

British Army Senior XV: 15 Sgt Malcolm Roberts (captain), 14 Spr Ben Suru, 13 Spr Peceli Nacamavuto, 12 Cpl Andrew Parkinson, 11 LCpl Eugene Viljoen, 10 LCpl James Balfrey, 9 LCpl Alipate Vakasawaqa, 8 Hldr Isoa Damudamu, 7 LCpl Maccu Koroiyadi, 6 Pte Joe Kava, 5 Pte Ledua Jope, 4 Cpl Benjamin Hughes, 3 LCpl Melvin Lewis, 2 Cpl Jason Kemble, 1 Sig Ryan Grant. Replacements: 16 Ben Hankinson, 17 Cpl John Beart, 18 Lt Mark Lee, 19 LBdr Gareth Gareth Libbey, 20 Capt Adrian Twyning, 21 Lt Mark Honeybun, 22 Slade-Jones

Coach: WO2 Andy Sanger

African Leopards: Steeve Sargos (Senegal), Thierry Park (Mauritius), John Musoke (Uganda), Allan Musoke (Uganda), JM Meyer (Namibia), Bakary Meite (Ivory Coast), John Lloyd - Captain (Tanzania), Arnauld Kamga (Cameroon), Jawad Ezyar (Morocco, Gareth Gilbert (Botswana), Shingai Chiwanga (Zimbabwe), Jacques Burger (Namibia), Edgar Babou (Ivory Coast), Harif Amid (Morocco), Kaiss Aissa (Tunisia), Innocent Simiyu (Kenya), Yousri Souguir (Tunisia), Kalafo Tlialane (South Africa), Dan Weku (Kenya), Emile Wessels (Namibia)

Coaches: Brendan Venter (South Africa), Claude Saurel (France)

=== French Under 20 team ===
Wednesday 10 October 2007, Metz Saint Symphorien Stadium

The African Leopards won 17-12 in a friendly match.

Squad: Jacques Leitao, Cleopas Makotose (Zimbabwe), Nyondo George Armitage (Zambia), Joudoul Youssef, Boutataty Abdellatif, Abachri Abdelkafi, Dermouni Mohammed (Morocco), Jonathan Charles Francke, Wigan Marvin Pekeur, Steph Roberts (South Africa), Guerraoui Ali (Algeria), Derrick Wamalwa, Dan Weku (Kenya), Robert Sseguya, Allan Musoke (Uganda), Sargos Steeve, Koita Magname, Magassa Moussa (Senegal), Bobou Edgar, Meite Bakary (Côte d'Ivoire), Souguir Mouhamed Yosri (Tunisia) and Tchougong Arnold (Cameroon).

Officials: Said Zniber (Team Manager, Morocco), Muhammed Sahraoui (Coach, Tunisia), Abdelaziz Bougja (CAR President Chief De Mission) and Paul Sigombe (CAR Vice President, Coordinator)
