= Juliet Wyers =

American singer-songwriter

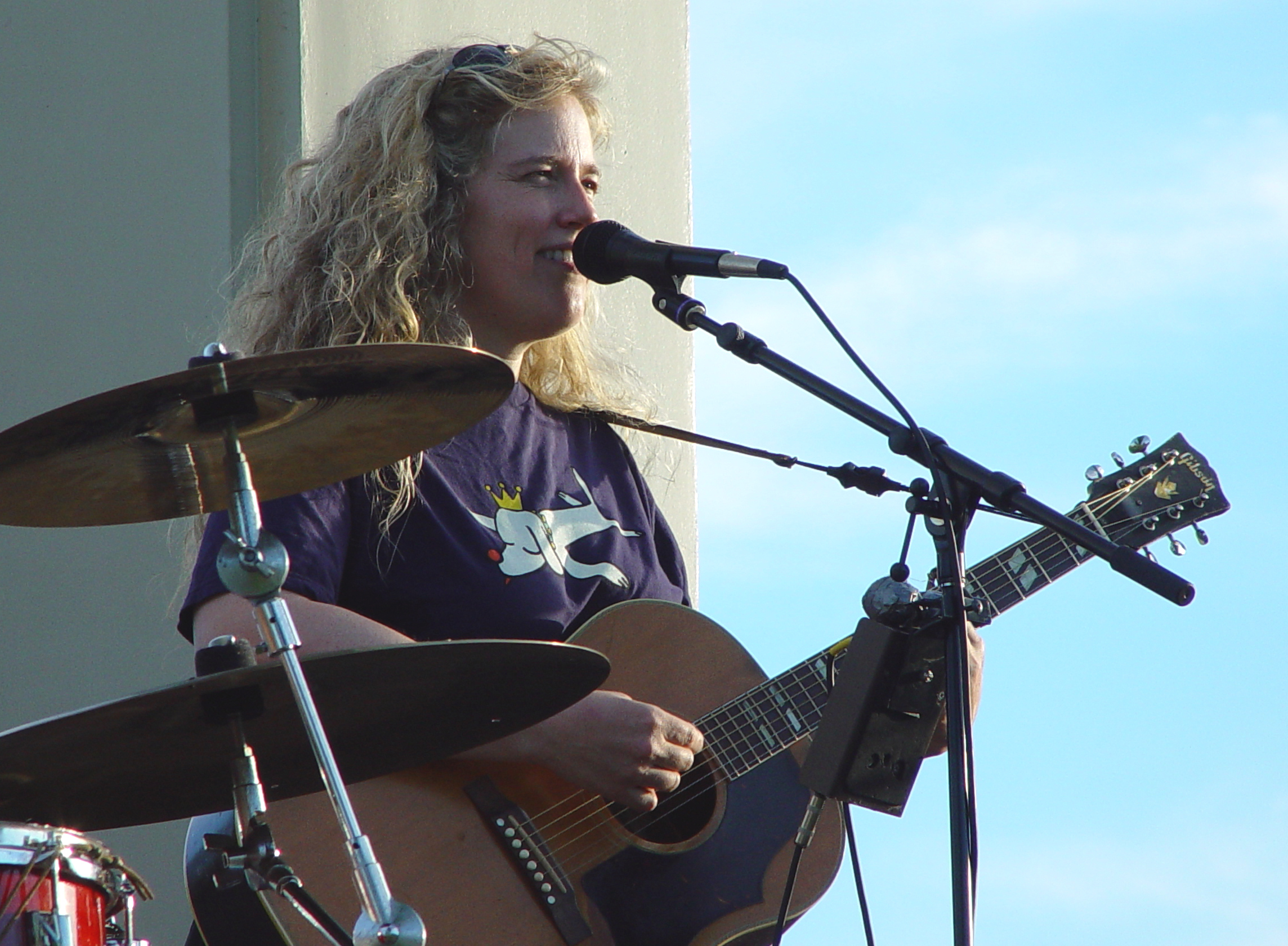
- Wyers in 2005

Background information
- Genres: Folk rock
- Instrument(s): Vocals, guitar, piano
- Years active: 2003–present
- Website: julietwyers.com

Juliet Wyers is an American singer-songwriter from Portland, Oregon. She has recorded two albums, Clear (2003) and sunlit (summer:live) (2005). Clear ranked 22nd in CD Baby's 2003 Top 100 Sellers contest, out of 35,000 artists. Clear was also No. 27 Most Played Album on the FolkDJ charts, and the first track, "Life, Love Me," was No. 24 Most Played Song (November 2003).

In 2003, Wyers was a finalist in six national songwriting competitions, including the New Folk competition at the Kerrville Folk Festival and the Emerging Artist Showcase at the Falcon Ridge Folk Festival.

== Discography ==
- Clear (2003)
- sunlit (summer:live) (2005)
