= Juliet Gopinath =

American optical engineer

Juliet Tara Gopinath is an American optical engineer who studies the design and synchronization of lasers, diode laser arrays, liquid and variable-focus lenses, and other optical devices, and the properties of optical materials including optical fibers. She is Alfred T. and Betty E. Look Endowed Professor of Photonics and Quantum Engineering in the Department of Electrical, Computer and Energy Engineering at the University of Colorado Boulder.

== Education and career ==
Gopinath is the daughter of Anand Gopinath, an electrical engineer from India who later moved to the UK and University of Minnesota, and his wife Marian (née Wells), a violinist originally from Nottingham.

Gopinath majored in electrical engineering as an undergraduate at the University of Minnesota, graduating summa cum laude in 1998. She continued to study electrical engineering at the Massachusetts Institute of Technology, earning a master's degree there in 2000 and completing her Ph.D. in 2005. Her dissertation, Studies of third-order nonlinearities in materials and devices for ultrafast lasers, was supervised by Erich P. Ippen.

After four years as a laser researcher at the MIT Lincoln Laboratory, Gopinath joined the University of Colorado Boulder as an assistant professor in 2009. She was promoted to associate professor in 2017, given the Alfred T. and Betty E. Look Endowed Professorship in 2019, and promoted again to full professor in 2021.

== Recognition ==
Gopinath was named as a 2022 Optica Fellow, "for pioneering contributions to nonlinear optics of nanophotonic devices and semiconductor lasers, and to the physics and applications of orbital angular momentum in optical fibers".
