= List of storms named Juliet =

The name Juliet has been used for two tropical cyclones: one in the Atlantic Ocean and one in the South-West Indian Ocean.

In the Atlantic:

- Tropical Storm Juliet (1978) – formed near Puerto Rico and dissipated west-southwest of Bermuda

In the South-West Indian:

- Cyclone Juliet (2005) – formed near the Cocos (Keeling) Islands in the Australian region as Severe Tropical Cyclone Adeline

== See also ==
- Cyclone Julie (1963) – a South-West Indian Ocean tropical cyclone with a similar name
