= Giulietta =

Giulietta may refer to:

== People ==
- Giulietta (singer) (born 1992), Australian pop singer
- Julie "Giulietta" Guicciardi (1784–1856), Austrian countess and piano student of Ludwig van Beethoven
- Giulietta De Riso (1896–1988), Italian actress
- Giulietta Masina (1921–1994), Italian actress
- Giulietta Pezzi (1810–1878), Italian writer and journalist
- Giulietta Simionato (1910–2010), Italian mezzo-soprano
- Giulietta "Lietta" Tornabuoni (1931–2011), Italian film critic, journalist and author

== Others ==
- Alfa Romeo Giulietta, Alfa Romeo's various anniversary cars

== See also ==
- Romeo and Juliet (disambiguation)
- Julietta (disambiguation)
- Juliette (disambiguation)
- Juliet (given name)
