= Julietta, Indiana =

- Location of Julietta in the state of Indiana
- Coordinates: 39°44′15″N 85°57′26″W
- Country: United States
- State: Indiana
- County: Marion
- City: Indianapolis
- Elevation: 830 ft (250 m)
- Time zone: UTC-5 (EST)
  - Summer (DST): UTC-4 (EDT)
- ZIP code: 437144
- Area code: 317
- GNIS feature ID: 440019

Julietta, Indiana is a small neighborhood in Indianapolis. It is located in eastern Marion County, on the border of Hancock County. Julietta is situated 11 miles (17.7 km) east of downtown Indianapolis and 3.5 miles (5.6 km) west of New Palestine, Indiana. The neighborhood is adjacent to U.S. Route 52.

Julietta is home to a historic property, dating to 1832, that originally served as the county's poorhouse. It later became the Marion County Infirmary (also known as Julietta Asylum) which was an asylum for the mentally ill that transitioned to primarily a home for the elderly by the early 1900s. As of 2021, it is occupied by Hope Center Indy.
