= Juliet Hooker =

Nicaraguan political scientist

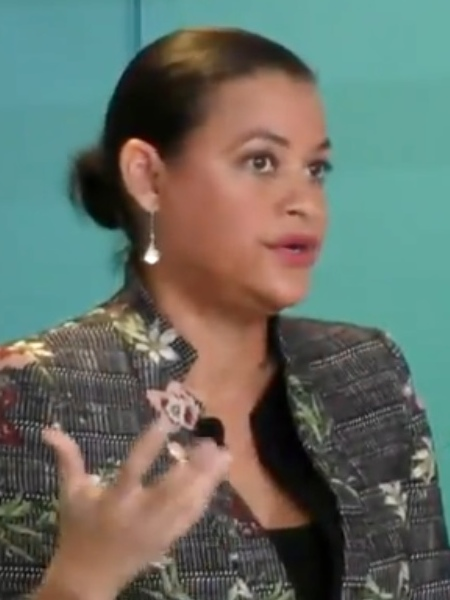
- Juliet Hooker in 2018
- Education: Williams College; Cornell University
- Awards: Ralph J. Bunche Award, APSA
- Scientific career
- Fields: Political science; Latin American studies
- Workplaces: University of Texas at Austin; Brown University

Juliet Hooker is a Nicaraguan-born political scientist who currently holds the Royce Family Professorship of Teaching Excellence in Political Science at Brown University. She is a political philosopher who focuses on racial justice, the theory of multiculturalism, and the political thought of the Americas.

== Early life and education ==
When Hooker was a girl, her family moved from the Afro-Caribbean coast of Nicaragua to its capital and largest city, Managua.

Hooker obtained a BA in political science from Williams College in 1994. She then studied government at Cornell University, earning an MA in 1998 and a PhD in 2001. After receiving her PhD, she became a Rockefeller Post-Doctoral researcher at the University of Texas at Austin in 2001, and then a member of the faculty there in 2002. She remained there until 2017, when she moved to Brown University.

== Career ==
In addition to book chapters as well as journal articles in outlets like Political Theory and the Journal of Latin American Studies, Hooker has written three books: Race and the Politics of Solidarity (2009), Theorizing Race in the Americas: Douglass, Sarmiento, Du Bois, and Vasconcelos (2017), and Black Grief/White Grievance (2023). In Race and the Politics of Solidarity, Hooker argues that rhetoric of solidarity and multiculturalism can hinder both political theory and public policy in addressing racial injustice, specifically by obfuscating the way that racial hierarchies continue to be constructed and imposed on people. The book uses Government of Nicaragua policies promoting multiculturalism as a case to argue that racial categories are unignorable in any theory of justice which can successfully challenge white supremacy. The political scientist Bruce Baum wrote that Hooker "makes a valuable contribution to multicultural theory, critical race theory, democratic theory, and the study of Latin American politics" and that her most innovative contribution is "how she brings all of these literatures into a fruitful dialogue".

Hooker's second book, Theorizing Race in the Americas: Douglass, Sarmiento, Du Bois, and Vasconcelos, was published in 2017. The book examines the political philosophy of Frederick Douglass, W. E. B. Du Bois, Domingo Faustino Sarmiento, and José Vasconcelos, in order to study the political theory of race in the Americas. The philosopher Andrea J. Pitts wrote that, "while the book itself offers a compelling set of analyses regarding race, national and pan-national identities, and democratic theory, it is Hooker's scope, methodological innovativeness, and theoretical complexity that make the work exceptional." In a review of the work, political theorist Saladin Ambar wrote that it could be understood as part of a project by thinkers like Hooker, Michael Hanchard, Robin Kelley, and Pap Ndiaye to develop transnational theories of race informed by international political developments.

For Theorizing Race in the Americas, Hooker received the American Political Science Association's 2018 Ralph J. Bunche Award, which is awarded each year to "the best scholarly work in political science that explores the phenomenon of ethnic and cultural pluralism". The award committee wrote that the book is "beautifully written, theoretically rich, and methodologically innovative".

Hooker has served in significant service positions in political science, including several committees of the American Political Science Association. Hooker has also written for media outlets like The Chronicle of Higher Education and the North American Congress on Latin America, and she has been featured on the radio station KPFA and the show White House Chronicle on WETA. Her work has been cited or described in media outlets like The Washington Post, the Atlanta Black Star, and the Havana Times.

== Selected works ==
- "Indigenous Inclusion/Black Exclusion: Race, Ethnicity and Multicultural Citizenship in Latin America", Journal of Latin American Studies (2005)
- Race and the Politics of Solidarity (2009)
- Theorizing Race in the Americas: Douglass, Sarmiento, Du Bois, and Vasconcelos (2017)

== Selected awards ==
- Ralph J. Bunche Award, American Political Science Association (2018)
