= Allan Musoke =

Rugby union player (born 1980)

- Born: 1980 (age 45–46)

Rugby union career
- Position: Wing
International career
| Years | Team | Apps | (Points) |
- Uganda

Allan Musoke, also known as Sokee, was born in 1980. He is a retired rugby player who played in the Uganda rugby union. He plays as a wing. Musoke had a decorated career with the Uganda National Rugby team and his club the UTL Kobs and he is considered to be one of Uganda's greatest rugby players. Professionally, he is a Learning and Development professional who works as a Human Resources Consultant with Strategic Engagement Limited.

== Career ==
Musoke practiced several sports since his youth years. He played basketball for DMark Power in the FUBA League, from 1996 to 1999. In 1999, he joined Kobs RFC while he was still at Kings College Buddo. From 2000 to 2002, he played football for Nsibirwa Hall at Makerere University, as a striker, until he decided to dedicate himself exclusively to rugby union thus joining Uganda Telecom Kobs Rugby Club (UTL) and in 2006, he captained Uganda at the Commonwealth Games. Musoke is a two-time Most Valuable Player (MVP) of the Uganda rugby league.

At international level, he played for the Uganda, and is currently the top scorer for the "Cranes". He was a key player in the team that won the CAR Africa Cup on 29 September 2007, in a 42–11 win over Madagascar, in a game where he scored a try.

Musoke also played for the African Leopards multinational team, on July 23, 2005, in the 15–30 loss to the South African Students, in Ellis Park, Johannesburg and was then part of 2 subsequent tours to the United Kingdom (British Army) and France (France U20). Musoke is a six time title champion in the Uganda Rugby League and also won four cups with the Kobs.

Since retiring from active play, Musoke has transitioned into a professional career as a Learning and Development Senior Consultant in Human Resources. He has also served as a commentator and mentor for the sport, helping to develop younger players.

== Awards and achievements ==
Musoke was part of the Uganda Rugby Cranes team that won the CAR Africa Cup on 29 September 2007.

In 2006, he was named as the Most Valuable Player in the Ugandan league.

Musoke was part of the Uganda Rugby Cranes team that won the CAR Africa Cup in 2002.

Musoke while at UTL Kobs, he won six Uganda Rugby League titles that is to say in 2003, 2006, 2007, 2008, 2014 and 2016.

He is also a four‑time Uganda Cup winner.

== See also ==
- Uganda rugby union
- Philip Wokorach
