= Juliette Dodu =

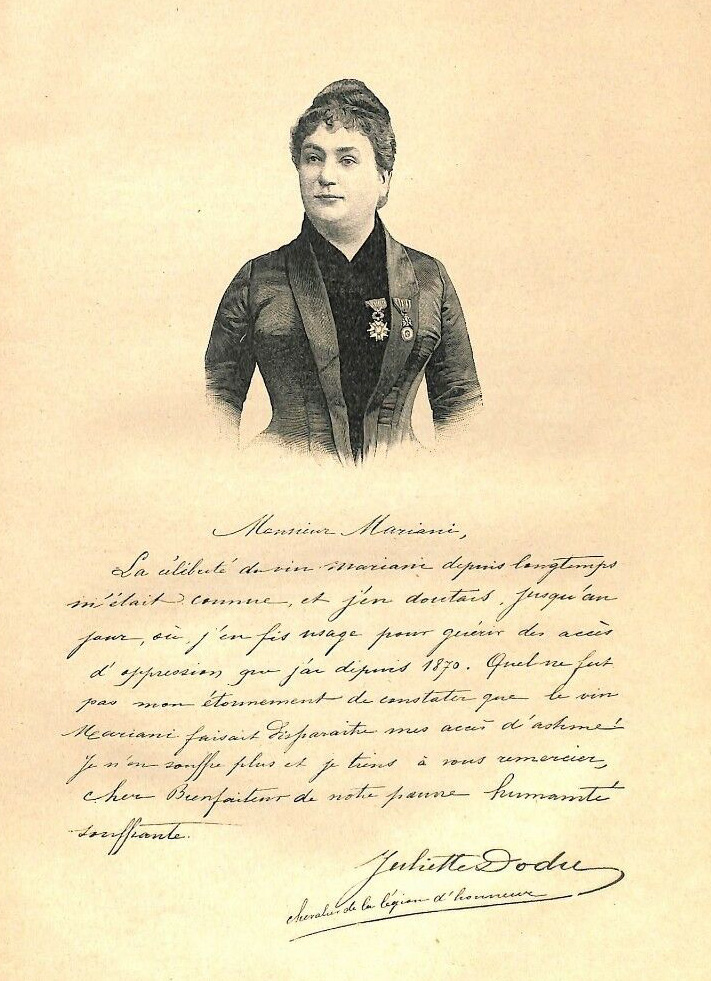
Juliette Dodu wears the Legion of Honor as well as the Military Medal. Engraving by A.Lalauze.

Juliette Dodu (Saint-Denis de la Réunion, June 15, 1848 – October 28, 1909) was a legendary heroine of the Franco-Prussian War of 1870, and the first woman to be awarded the Legion of Honor. However, many doubts have been raised about her actions during the war, and her story remains controversial.

== Early life ==
Juliette Dodu was born in Réunion, the daughter of Alphonse Dodu, a navy surgeon originally from Indre, and Desaïffre de Pellegrin, a créole. Her father died of yellow fever when she was two. In 1864, at the age of sixteen, she left the island with her mother, who found work in France as director of the telegraph office of Pithiviers (Loiret).

== The Franco-Prussian War and the Famous Wiretap Story ==
It was in the course of the Franco-Prussian War of 1870 that she became famous. The Prussians occupied Pithiviers on September 20, 1870. The telegraph office was seized and the Dodu family was relegated to the second floor of the house. The young woman of twenty-two then had the idea to rig up a tap on the wire that passed by her room. Having kept a receiving apparatus, she was thus able to intercept the transmissions each time that the occupiers received or sent dispatches.

For 17 days, the young woman was able to deliver the dispatches to the French authorities without the slightest suspicion on the part of the Prussians, who were seduced by the charm of the young Frenchwoman. It was claimed that she saved the lives of 40,000 soldiers of General Aurelle de Paladines by means of one of her intercepted messages. However, the wiretap was discovered when a German soldier overheard a housekeeper accuse Juliette Dodu of tapping the telegraph wires. The Prussians prosecuted Juliette Dodu and tried her for espionage before a court-martial. She is reputed to have told her judges, Je suis Française et ma mère aussi, j’ai agi pour mon pays. Messieurs, faites de moi ce que vous voudrez ("I am French and so is my mother. I have acted for my country. Messieurs, do with me as you wish!"). She was condemned to death. But the armistice was signed before her execution and Juliette Dodu was pardoned by prince Frederick Charles of Prussia and set free.

However, decree number 1942 of December 8, 1870 only accorded her an honorable mention, as well as the 20 other employees and agents of the telegraphic service, because the postal employees were utilized to aid the army in the use of the telegraph.

== Creating the Legend in the Press ==
In 1873, Juliette Dodu was responsible for the telegraph office of Enghien-les-Bains, where she made the acquaintance of Hippolyte de Villemessant, the patron of Le Figaro. On May 26, 1877, the first known version of the "legend of Dodu" appeared in that journal.

Now cast as a symbol of the French resistance, Juliette Dodu was the first woman to receive the Military Medal and the Cross of the Legion of Honor. Patrice de Mac-Mahon, Marshal of France and president of the Third Republic, signed the decree of July 30, 1878, where it is stipulated " for intercepting dispatches at the peril of her life in 1870, for being condemned to death by the enemy and saved by the cessation of hostilities."

== Later life ==
Around 1875, she began a relationship with the baron Félix Hippolyte Larrey, medical chief of the army and son of the celebrated Larrey, and inherited his fortune (including his small château at Bièvres, Essonne). In 1880, she became inspector of schools and asylums and took up residence in Switzerland. Under the pseudonym of Lipp, she published a work in 1891 dedicated to George Sand, l'Eternel Roman.

She died in 1909 at the Clarens, Switzerland home of her brother-in-law, the painter Odilon Redon.

== The Controversy Surrounding the Legend ==
The Courrier du Loiret (Pithiviers newspaper) devoted a series of articles to Juliette Dodu in 1984 (one may find a copy at the Bièvres library). According to its author, "Élisabeth de Mac-Mahon, wife of Patrice de Mac-Mahon, Marshal of France and president of the Third Republic, was an earnest feminist. It is not unthinkable that the text of the nomination of Juliette Dodu for the order of the Legion of Honor had been through her intervention.".

This thesis was taken up again by the French author Guy Breton in his publication Les Beaux mensonges de l'histoire (The Beautiful Falsehoods of History). Breton alleges that the entire story of Juliette Dodu was not in fact anything but a fable gotten up by the journalist of the Figaro who signed himself Jean de Paris in an article of May 26, 1877, acting on behalf of M. de Villemessant, his director. In fact, it was not until seven years after the fact that one first heard of Mlle. Dodu. Guy Breton cites as reference general Aurelle de Paladines, commander in chief of the army of the Loire, who nowhere mentions that heroic salvation of his army. Lieutenant-colonel Rousset, author of a Histoire de la guerre Franco Allemande 1870–1871 (History of the Franco-Prussian War of 1870–1871), never makes any reference to it, while he swarms with lively details up to and including the depth of the snow and the state of the sky. Neither the report of M. Steenackens, director of the posts and telegrams of the period, who described all the acts of resistance of his employees during that war.

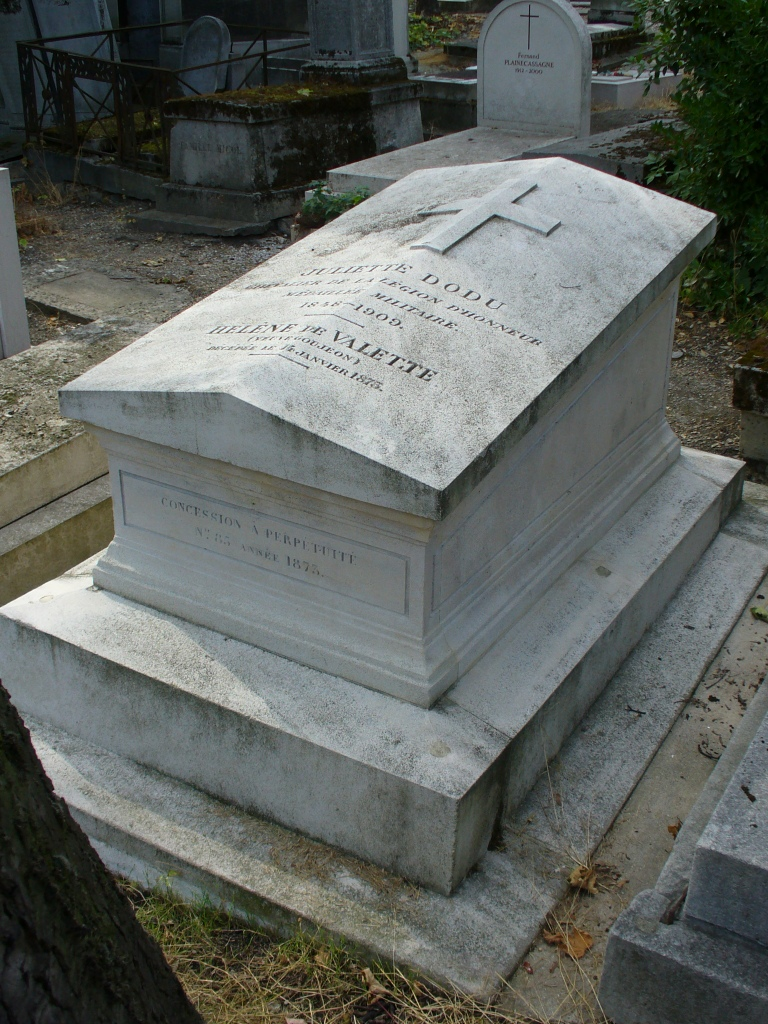
Tombe de Juliette Dodu

Guy Breton also lays out the inconsistencies of this eventful narrative; among others, that the Prussians had already quit Pithiviers three weeks before the related deeds, and the impossibility of collecting by sound a cipher message in German and passing the retransmission in Morse afterwards without error. This supposes a great familiarity, not only with the language, but also with the Prussian military codes. Furthermore, no one in Pithiviers possessed the Prussian codes.

There is also no trace of the condemnation to death of Juliette Dodu, nor of her pardon. Which, according to Breton, leads one to the question of a possible hoax by M. de Villemessant, who obtained the Legion of Honor for a false heroine in a period when, just after the Paris Commune of 1871, France had just lost Alsace-Lorraine and defamed itself at the time of the Commune of Paris, had so much need for positive heroes.

== Homages ==
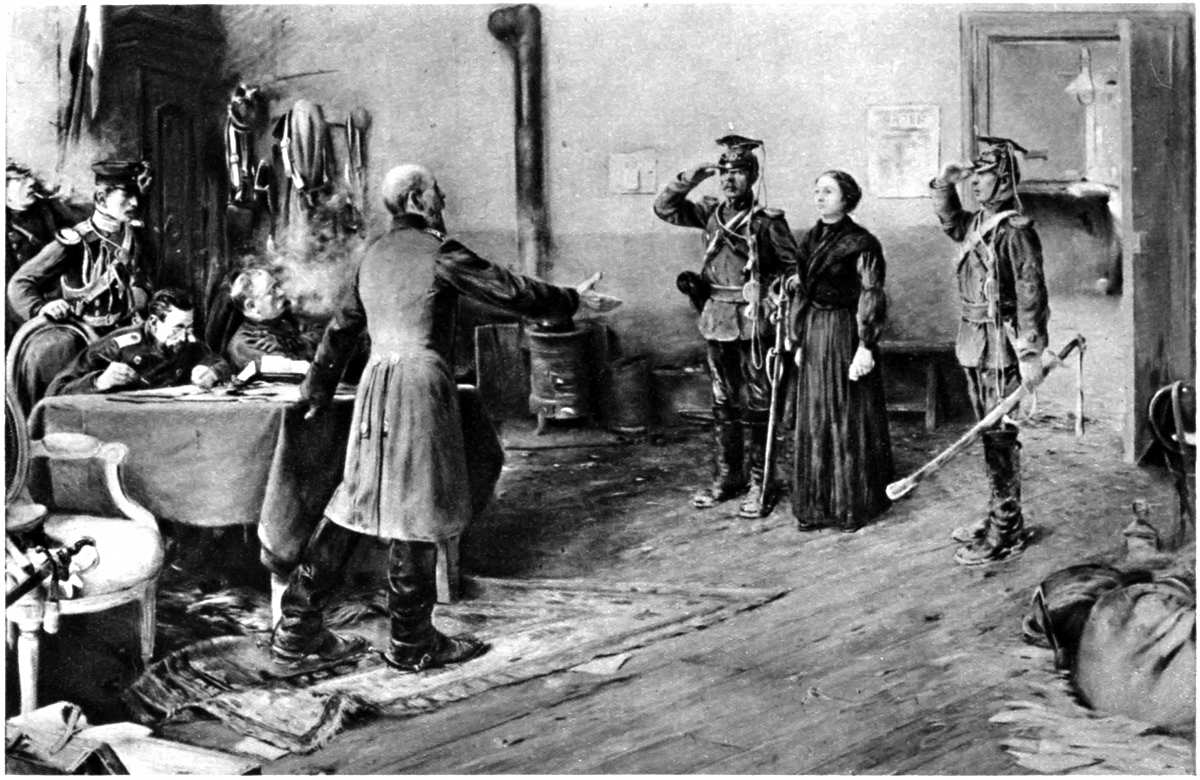
Juliette Dodu in 1870 by Ernest Jean Delahaye.

- A street bears her name in Paris, Havre, Montreuil, and Saint-Denis de la Réunion, where one likewise counts a public high school named in her honor. In Bièvres, the town where she lived, she is represented by a statue.
- The tomb of Juliette Dodu can be found in the Père-Lachaise Cemetery, 28th division.
- A 0,56 € postage stamp, issued in 2009 on the one hundredth anniversary of her death. See "Histoire des faux-héros 2/4". La Fabrique de l'Histoire par Emmanuel Laurentin, France Culture. Archived from the original on 2011-07-21.

== Bibliography ==
- Les amis de la bibliothèque, Bièvres et ses célébrités au XIX° siècle, 1988.
- « Juliette Dodu, héroïne ou catin ? », a series of articles by Georges Durand, published in May and June 1984 in the Courrier du Loiret.
- Francis Gribble. "Women in War". London: Sampson Low, Marston and Co., Ltd, 1916, 39-48.
- Jeanne Bouvier. Histoire des Dames Employees dans les Postes, Telegraphes et Telephones de 1714 a 1929. Paris: Les Presses Universitaires de France, 1930. pp. 329–330.
