= Juliet Alexander =

Guyanese-born British educator, journalist and TV presenter

Juliet Alexander is a Guyanese-born British educator, journalist and television presenter, who for more than four decades has worked in print and broadcast media, as well as in a range of educational and community organisations. She is notable as a pioneering broadcaster who presented the UK's first Black news and current affairs magazine television programme, Ebony, launched in 1982.

== Background ==
Born in Guyana, Juliet Alexander came to the UK in 1965, growing up in east London in the 1970s. She would send articles she had written to the local newspaper, the Hackney Gazette, where she was published using a name that did not make it obvious she was black and female. She subsequently managed to get a job there and worked as a junior reporter on the newspaper for five years. She said in an interview for the 1982 book It Ain't Half Racist Mum: Fighting racism in the media (edited by Phil Cohen and Carl Gardner): "I started at 18, when most people in the office were young, left of centre, and anti-racist. Being black didn’t affect what I did at the beginning — that was in 1975." She also wrote for The Guardian and The Sunday Times.

She went on to work on BBC Radio London's Black Londoners programme, co-presenting the pioneering black daily radio show with Alex Pascall, and from 1982 to 1990 she presented Ebony, the BBC's first Black news and current affairs magazine TV programme, with Vince Herbert. She was a reporter for John Craven's Newsround, with other credits as a presenter including Songs of Praise, BBC Radio 4's Woman's Hour, Newsroom South East, LWT News, Granada Reports, and Central News. Alexander also worked as a producer, including on Black Britain.

Holding a master's degree in Documentary Research, Alexander has been a lecturer at such educational institutions as Thames Valley University, Regent's American College London, Roehampton University, and Birkbeck College. She has also served in senior roles with a range of community and voluntary organisations. These have included over the years: Talawa Theatre Company, artsdepot, the Mary Seacole Memorial Statue Appeal, the Amos Bursary (which champions academic excellence and professional development in young men and women of African and Caribbean heritage), and chair of publishing charity FHALMA (Friends of the Huntley Archives at the London Metropolitan Archives), and she was a founding member of the BBC's diversity and inclusion forum.

On 8 March 2023, Alexander's legacy was marked in an International Women's Day presentation entitled "Black Women in Broadcast Journalism" as part of the African Odysseys series at the BFI.
