= Mitooma District =

- District
- District location in Uganda
- Coordinates: 00°36′S 30°00′E
- Country: Uganda
- Region: Western Uganda
- Sub-region: Ankole sub-region
- Capital: Mitooma

Area
  - Total: 542.8 km^{2} (209.6 sq mi)
- Elevation: 1,600 m (5,200 ft)

Population (2012 Estimate)
  - Total: 196,300
  - Density: 361.6/km^{2} (937/sq mi)
- Time zone: UTC+3 (EAT)
- Area code: 106
- Website: www.mitooma.go.ug

Mitooma District is a district in Western Uganda. It is named after its main municipal, administrative and commercial center, Mitooma.

== Location ==
Mitooma District is bordered by Bushenyi District to the north, Sheema District to the east, Ntungamo District to the south, and Rukungiri District to the west. Mitooma, where the district headquarters are located is located some 25 kilometres (16 mi), by road, southwest of Bushenyi, the nearest large town. This location lies approximately 85 kilometres (53 mi), by road, west of Mbarara, the largest city in Ankole sub-region. The coordinates of the district are:00 36S, 30 00E.

== Overview ==
The district was created by qn Act of Parliament and became functional on 1 July 2010. Previously, the district used to be Ruhinda County in Bushenyi District. Mitooma district is part of Ankole sub-region. The sub-region, which is coterminous with the Ankole Kingdom, comprises the following districts: 1. Buhweju District 2. Bushenyi District 3. Ibanda District 4. Isingiro District 5. Kiruhura District 6. Mitooma District 7. Ntungamo District 8. Rubirizi District and 9. Sheema District. The sub-region was home to an estimated 2.2 million people, according to the 2002 national census.

== Population ==
In 1991, the national population census estimated the district population at about 134,300. In 2002, the national census estimated the population of the district at about 160,800. In 2012, the population of Mitooma District was estimated at 196,300.

== Prominent people ==
- Ambassador Najuna-Njuneki – Politician and diplomat. He is currently the Ambassador in charge of Special Duties in the Ministry of Foreign Affairs. Focal Point for Commercial and Economic Diplomacy.
- Major General Kahinda Otafiire – Minister of Justice & Constitutional Affairs in the Ugandan Cabinet. And Bikwasi Haruna Rwamutakitwe A businessman from Kirembe Nyihanda Mitooma Ruhinda A son of Late DR Abu Bikwasi from Kayanga village in Mitooma District
- Juliet Bashiisha Agasha – Member of Parliament

== Schools ==
=== Tertiary Schools ===
- Kabira Technical Institute

=== Secondary and High School ===
- Ruhinda Senior Secondary School
- Kyeibare Girls Secondary School
- St. Noah Secondary School, Mutara
- Ijumo Progressive Secondary School
- Kigarama Secondary School, Bitereko.
- Bubangizi Senior Secondary School, Kashenshero.
- Kashenshero Girls Secondary School
- Kashenshero vocational school
- Kanyabwanga Secondary School
- Mushunga primary school
- Mayanga Seed School
- Nyakishojwa Senior Secondary School

== Economy ==
- Agriculture (mainly food and cash crops)
- livestock farming
- Trade
- Commerce
- Fishing in the near by lake

== Livestock kept ==
- Cattle
- Poultry
- Goat
- Sheep

== See also ==
- Mitooma
- Ankole sub-region
- Western Region, Uganda
- Bushenyi District
- Districts of Uganda
