= Juliet Bashiisha Agasha =

Ugandan politician

The Honourable Juliet Bashiisha Agasha MP
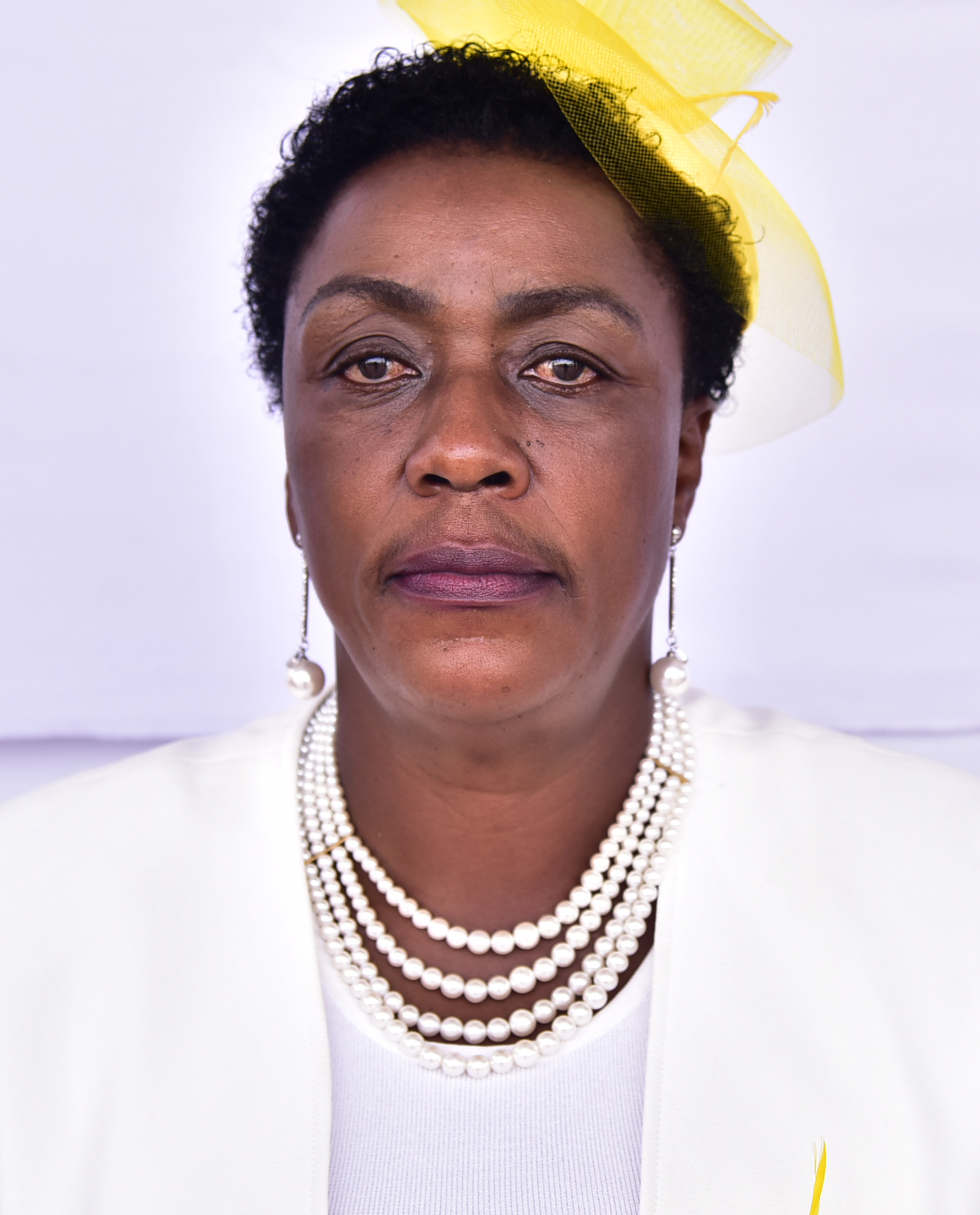

Member of Parliament for Mitooma District
- Incumbent
- Assumed office 17 May 2021
- Preceded by: Jovah Kamateeka

Personal details
- Party: National Resistance Movement
- Education: Makerere University

Juliet Bashiisha Agasha is a Ugandan politician who has served in the Parliament of Uganda since 2021. Agasha represents the Mitooma District's reserved seat for women as a member of the National Resistance Movement.

== Political career ==
In the 2011 Ugandan general election, Agasha ran as an independent candidate for the Parliament of Uganda in the Mitooma District's reserved seat for women. Agasha faced Jovah Kamateeka of the National Resistance Movement. Agasha was defeated by Kamateeka, receiving 19,971 votes compared to Kamateeka's 29,263 votes. In the 2016 Ugandan general election, Agasha again ran as an independent against Kamateeka. Though Agasha was again defeated, she lost by a smaller margin, receiving 32,032 votes compared to Kamateeka's 37,949.

In the 2021 Ugandan general election, Agasha ran against Kamateeka for a third time. Agasha narrowly defeated Kamateeka in the NRM primary, receiving 25,228 votes to 23,227. The primary reason for Kamateeka's loss was her age, with many primary voters stating they would prefer to see a new, younger representative in parliament. Despite her defeat in the primary, Kamateeka ran in the general election as an independent candidate. While Agasha's primary base of support was in the Ruhinda South constituency, Kamateeka was unable to coalesce a base of support due to a third candidate, independent Rebecca Kyarampe, splitting the vote with Kamateeka in several of her strongest areas. Agasha ultimately defeated Kamateeka and Kyarampe in the general election, receiving 34,736 votes compared to Kamateeka's 16,148 and Kyarampe's 13,974.

During her tenure in parliament, Agasha has been credited with improving the economic conditions in the Mitooma District, while also advocating for female and youth empowerment. She serves on the Natural Resources Committee and the Equal Opportunities Committee.

She lost her MP seat after polling 23,773 votes and was defeated by Rebecca Kyarampe who was able garner 43,684 votes during the 2026 elections.
