= Juliette (disambiguation) =

Juliette is a feminine given name. It may also refer to:

== Music ==
- Juliette (Brazilian singer), Brazilian lawyer, makeup artist and singer Juliette Freire Feitosa (born 1989)
- Juliette (Canadian singer), Canadian singer and TV personality Juliette Cavazzi (1926–2017)
- Juliette (French singer), French singer Juliette Noureddine (born 1962)
- "Juliette" (Little Feat song), a song on the album Dixie Chicken
- "Juliette" (Shinee song), a song on the EP Romeo

== Other uses ==
- Juliette (novel), also known as L'Histoire de Juliette, a novel by the Marquis de Sade
- Juliette (TV series), a long-running Canadian musical-variety TV series
- Juliette, Georgia, an unincorporated community in the United States
- Hurricane Juliette, tropical cyclones named Juliette
- Juliette (butterfly), also known as Eueides aliphera
- Juliette, a brand name for the Ethinylestradiol/cyproterone acetate birth control pill

== See also ==
- "Juliette & Jonathan", a 1990s pop song
- Juliette and the Licks, American rock band led by actress Juliette Lewis
- "Mademoiselle Juliette", song by French singer Alizée
- Juliett (disambiguation)
- Juliet (disambiguation)
- Joliet (disambiguation)
- Joliette (disambiguation)
