= Juliet Frankland =

British mycologist (1929–2013)

- Born: Juliet Camilla Brown; 30 January 1929; Effingham, Surrey, England
- Died: 9 June 2013 (aged 84); Stobars Hall, Kirkby Stephen, Cumbria, England
- Education: Royal Holloway, University of London
- Occupation: mycologist
- Known for: "a world expert on fungi"
- Spouse: (Edward) Raven Percy Frankland
- Parent(s): Walter Henry Brown; Gerda Lois Brown, née Grenside
- Relatives: Dame Gillian Brown (sister)

Juliet Camilla Frankland FLS (née Brown, 30 January 1929 – 9 June 2013), was a British botanist and mycologist, and "a world expert on fungi".

== Early life ==
She was born Juliet Camilla Brown on 30 January 1929 at High Barn Eaves, Effingham, Dorking, Surrey, the younger daughter of Walter Henry Brown (1893/4–1956), a Ministry of Works civil servant, and his wife, Gerda Lois Brown, née Grenside (1885–1961), an artist.

She earned a bachelor's degree and PhD from Royal Holloway, University of London.

== Career ==
In 1956, she started her career, working for the Nature Conservancy (later part of the Natural Environment Research Council) as a mycologist at Merlewood, Grange-over-Sands, Lancashire. This later became the Institute of Terrestrial Ecology.

In 1969, Frankland was elected as a fellow of the Linnean Society.

Frankland was president of the British Mycological Society (BMS) in 1995.

== Personal life ==
On 3 June 1959, she married (Edward) Raven Percy Frankland (1918–1997), a farmer from Ravenstonedale, near Kirkby Stephen, Westmorland, the son of scientist and novelist Edward Percy Frankland, and grandson of the chemist Sir Edward Frankland.

They lived at Bowberhead, a farmhouse a few miles from Ravenstonedale, and did not have any children.

== Later life ==
In 1997, her husband Raven Frankland died suddenly, and she was left to run the estate alone. Her sister, Dame Gillian Brown, a retired diplomat, and the UK's ambassador to Norway, 1981 to 1983, moved to Bowberhead to help, but died unexpectedly in 1999.

Frankland suffered severe depression, and moved into Stobars Hall, a care home in Kirkby Stephen, where she died on 9 June 2013 from dementia and cardiovascular disease.
