= Juliet Kyinyamatama Suubi =

Ugandan politician

Hon. Juliet Kyinyamatama Suubi Juliet K

Member of Parliament, Woman Representative, Rakai District
- In office 2011–Incumbent

Personal details
- Born: 22 December 1988 (age 37) Uganda
- Citizenship: Uganda
- Party: Independent
- Education: Uganda Christian University; University of Geneva
- Occupation: Politician
- Profession: Social Worker
- Known for: Representing Rakai District as Woman MP for three consecutive terms

Juliet Kyinyamatama Suubi Juliet K (born 22 December 1988) is a Ugandan politician and member of parliament. In 2011, she was elected as a district woman representative in the parliament for Rakai district, re-elected for the second term in office in the 2016 Uganda General elections and for the 3rd term in office in the 2021 Uganda General elections.

She campaigned as an independent political candidate after losing in the National Resistance Movement primaries.

== Education ==
She completed her primary level education in 2001 at Ronald Ruta primary school in Lyantonde. In 2005 she completed her Uganda Certificate of Education (UCE) for lower secondary education at Valley College located in Bushenyi, where she completed her advanced secondary level known as Uganda Advanced Certification of Education (UACE) in 2008. In 2012 she graduated from Uganda Christian University with a Bachelor's degree of Social Work and Social Administration. She attained a certificate in Global Health from University of Geneva in 2013 .

== See also ==
- Independent politician
- Rakai district
- List of members of the ninth Parliament of Uganda
- List of members of the tenth Parliament of Uganda
- List of members of the eleventh Parliament of Uganda
- Member of Parliament
- Parliament of Uganda
