= List of National Cultural Sites in Western Region, Uganda =

This article contains a list of National Cultural Sites in Uganda in the Western Region of Uganda as defined by the Uganda Museum.

== List of monuments ==
ID	Site name	Description	District	Location	Original function	Coordinates	Image
UG-W-001	1520AD Eclipse Monument		Mbarara				More images Upload another image
UG-W-002	Butiaba Fort	Main port on lake Albert since 1800s.	Buliisa				Upload an image
UG-W-003	Bugungu Fort						Upload an image
UG-W-004	Sempaya hot springs	In Semliki National park two natural hot springs female boils up to 106 degrees and the male boils at 90 degrees.) cultural significance attached.	Bundibugyo				More images Upload another image
UG-W-005	Kitagata Hot Springs	Springs with clear water but curative, the Omugabe (royal) springs are on the easterly sides. The place is naturally stunning with papyrus swamp along it and it is a healing site for most locals as most of them flock into the site early in the morning and late in the evening for bathing. It attracts over 100 peoples on a daily basis. Has zones for women and children (Nazario Bihanga is the care taker)two sections one is Ekyomugabe, (royal) the other is Mulago as a general ward.	Bushenyi	near Kitagata hospital about 40 kilometers form Mbarara-Ishaka route.			Upload another image
UG-W-006	?	Challenges: Climate change swings.					Upload an image
UG-W-007	Katasiha Fort	The mouth of this cave was used for many generations for defence purposes and a fort was built at its mouth.	Hoima				Upload an image
UG-W-008	Kibiro caves	Royal wives were hidden during the times of war.					Upload an image
UG-W-009	Kibiro Harbour	Ancient port used by Banyoro to cross Lake Albert.					Upload an image
UG-W-010	Kibiro ancient salt gardens						Upload an image
UG-W-011	Musaijaa Mukuru hill	An ancient citadel and military observation post. History of war times, stronghold of Banyoro against Baganda, later it was taken by Thurston/50 soldiers in 1894. Bwebandwa caves lie in the north.					Upload an image
UG-W-012	Buhuka early mans site						Upload an image
UG-W-013	Buyaga hill	The oldest settlement in the kingdom that has existed perpetually before the Ababiito dynasty.					Upload an image
UG-W-014	Bugyalya stools	curved out of stones.tools c					Upload an image
UG-W-015	?	Tomb of Cwaii Kabalega (1870–1899) and Tomb of Sir Toto Winyi IV (1924–1967)		Mparo Tombs			More images Upload another image
UG-W-016	Omukama’s palace						More images Upload another image
UG-W-017	Emin pasha s monument n at Buhanika	Place where Kabaka cwa ii and Kabalega received Dr Emin Pasha.					Upload an image
UG-W-018	Bakers view Kyangwali	Captain Lugards camping sites in Kyangwali					Upload an image
UG-W-019	Kaiso fossil site						Upload an image
UG-W-020	Ngangi historical tombs						Upload an image
UG-W-021	Kibedi historical tombs						Upload an image
UG-W-022	Kinogozi historical tomb (Bughahya)						Upload an image
UG-W-023	Miduuma historical tomb.						Upload an image
UG-W-024	Buhimba Heros Monument	War Mass grave.					More images Upload another image
UG-W-025	Galt Memorial	The 5-meter high monument was forcefully built by the locals at the site of Harry George Galt's killing by Rutaraka who hurled a spear towards Galt's chest on 19 May 1905. A trial and conviction were held for the Omugabe and his senior chiefs who were accused of gross negligence and were not spared. The Bahinda princes (Igumira and Rwakakaiga) were banished	Ibanda				More images Upload another image
UG-W-026	Kibubura graves	Memorial first person to embrace christianity Ist district administrator of Ibanda, Julia Kibubura					More images Upload another image
UG-W-027	Kibubura Girls' Secondary School	Named after Julia Kibubura.					More images Upload another image
UG-W-028	Kibubura Church	Named after Julia Kibubura. Also known as St. Paul Church of Uganda pro-cathedral, It is where Julia Kibubura and 25 other readers travelled by foot to Mbarara for baptism in 1903. Julia Kibubura was instrumental in the construction of the first church made of mud and wattle and which was later in 1970's to be replaced with the current St. Paul COU Ibanda on which Late Archbishop Luwum laid a foundation stone in 1976.					More images Upload another image
UG-W-029	Kagongo Hill	Hill for punishing girls that misbehaved.					Upload an image
UG-W-030	Nsongezi Archaeological site	Nsongezi caves and rock shelter of early man, containing late stone age microliths and dimple based pottery.	Isingiro	Kikagati trading center. Kampala-Kabale route past oruchinga refugees settlement and another route is about 64 kilometers Mbarara-Kitagati route			Upload an image
UG-W-031	Oruchinga valley						Upload an image
UG-W-032	Kanshhore island	Small island in Kagera river used by rulers of Ankole Ntare and Rwanga, as refuge sites, contains abundant dimple based wares					Upload an image
UG-W-033	W.J.Dogget Memorial	During the survey of boundary					Upload an image
UG-W-034	Rwandan Genocide burial ground, Kasensero						Upload an image
UG-W-035	Kigezi Museum		Kabale				Upload an image
UG-W-036	Karambi tombs	Tombs for three Abakama (Tooro Kings) that is Kyebambe Kamurasi, Rukidi III and Olumi Kaboyo II each holding his own tomb and also other royals of Tooro Kingdom. The royal regalia that were used by each of the three kings are kept in these tombs	Fortportal	6km away from town on Fort Portal- Kasese road			More images Upload another image
UG-W-037	Amabere ga Nyina mwiru	Cwezi legend.(Stalactites and stalagmites)					More images Upload another image
UG-W-038	Toro royal Palace	3 storied Building.					More images Upload another image
UG-W-039	Kagoma Tombs						Upload an image
UG-W-040	Karambi Tombs						More images Upload another image
UG-W-041	Fort portal	Fort of 1893					Upload another image
UG-W-042	Kasusu	NRA war mass grave					Upload an image
UG-W-043	Katebwa	NRA war mass grave					More images Upload another image
UG-W-044	Kicwamba	NRA war mass grave					More images Upload another image
UG-W-045	Buranga hot spring	Hot spring with curative					Upload an image
UG-W-046	Lake Saka						Upload an image
UG-W-047	Rweihamba market	Performs twice a week.					Upload an image
UG-W-048	Mpanga Market	New market?					Upload another image
UG-W-049	Toro botanical gardens	Conservational areas for the different medicinal plants.					Upload an image
UG-W-050	Royal Palace of Ntara	Kitagwenda Kingdom Kings.	Kamwenge				Upload an image
UG-W-051	Lugards camp	At Rugonjo is Lugards camp.					Upload an image
UG-W-052	Manyoro Fishing village	Fishing village and Market place.					Upload an image
UG-W-053	Kanungu inferno	At Katate, Kibwetere, Father Kataribabo, and Mwerinde leaders of the cult, conspired and set fire on their followers, also believed to perished in the fire.	Kanungu				Upload an image
UG-W-054	Banyabutumbi Tree						More images Upload another image
UG-W-055	Katwe salt gardens	Volcanic crater lake associated with traditional, salt production.	Kasese				Upload an image
UG-W-056	Equator Monument	At Kikorongo equator crossing is marked by two circular arches					More images Upload another image
UG-W-057	Queen mother memorial	monument at Kikorongo Located within the Queen Elizabeth national park.					Upload an image
UG-W-058	Fort George	Fort established by Lugard					Upload an image
UG-W-059	Kilembe mines	One of the oldest mines in Africa established in 1956 to exploit copper deposits.					Upload an image
UG-W-060	Kashenyi salt lakes.	Salt mining					Upload an image
UG-W-061	Kabusongora hill	(Bukonzo west), Associated with the origin of the Basongora clan among the Bakonzo. A cattle keeping clan. Common to the hill is the collection of grasshoppers (emishenene) which is also the totem for the clan.					Upload another image
UG-W-062	Rwagimba Hot springs	medicinal values of the hot spring.					Upload another image
UG-W-063	Rwenzori mountain shrines.						Upload an image
UG-W-064	Buthale	Source of iron ore for the local smiths and early iron implements market.					Upload an image
UG-W-065	Kagando	Is a monument that commemorates the grave of 3 Bakonzo heroes who fought against British colonial rule (through Toro) between 1919 and 1921.					Upload an image
UG-W-066	Bulemba.	In Ihandiro is a grave for Isaya Mukirane founder and late king of the Rwenzururu Kingdom and palace for the Rwenzururu movement . Also a pilgrimage site every year for the Rwenzururu.					Upload an image
UG-W-067	Mweya, Queen Elizabeth park	Archeulian tools are abundant at this site. A museum within the park.					Upload an image
UG-W-068	Ensa za Kateboha	Earth works of unknown date and origin, near Bugoma forest.	Kibaale				Upload an image
UG-W-069	Munsa earth works	Earthworks greatly preserved.					Upload an image
UG-W-070	Semwema rock Shelter	Caves and shrines					Upload an image
UG-W-071	Kibengo earth works	Earthworks					Upload an image
UG-W-072	Birembo	War mass grave NRA					Upload an image
UG-W-073	Kacuba caves	With pottery remains					Upload an image
UG-W-074	Mutaka caves	Ritual are visible.					Upload an image
UG-W-075	Kyempisi caves	Early occupation.					Upload an image
UG-W-076	Bigoma shelters	Opposite Lwenseera rock.					Upload an image
UG-W-077	Butonzo shelters	Over looks Munsa earthworks and Semwema rock shelters.					Upload an image
UG-W-078	Bwaanswa/Bijogoli caves	Rock shelter					Upload an image
UG-W-079	Isunga cold springs	At Isunga, in a pond containing cold water with sulphur, gives out bubbles at three different places, treatment of different ailments.					Upload an image
UG-W-080	Kibaale Royal palace	Bunyoro Kitala kings					Upload an image
UG-W-081	Nyabushozi	Birth place of wamara last ruler of the 14th-century Bacwezi empire.	Kiruhura				Upload an image
UG-W-082	?		Kiryandongo				Upload an image
UG-W-083	Kigezi memorial	First administrative centre for Kigezi district, where the agreement of demarcation between Uganda and Rwanda was made.	Kisoro				Upload an image
UG-W-084	Ruhengu cave						Upload an image
UG-W-085	Soko Cave						Upload an image
UG-W-086	Mutolerere cave						Upload an image
UG-W-087	Rwisangane cave						Upload an image
UG-W-088	Garama cave	Inside Mgahinga Gollira national park					Upload an image
UG-W-089	Bakers view		Kyegegwa				Upload an image
UG-W-090	Ibale lye Kitinisa	Buhembo village, home to one of the ancestral rulers of the Bachwezi.	Kyenjojo				Upload an image
UG-W-091	Kazinga channel and fossil village	early Pleistocene site					Upload an image
UG-W-092	Kasunga tea plantations	Open and offers experiences about tea growing, processing and promotion.					Upload an image
UG-W-093	Kiraba hill shelters	Popular site for refugee.					Upload an image
UG-W-094	Isandara Pit shafts (Enamba)	Pit shafts for iron ore smelting.					Upload an image
UG-W-095	Nyabihuru Caves	Near Muzizi river opposite Nakabimba.					Upload an image
UG-W-096	Kabashenyi caves	Kibanga hill, early stone age.					Upload an image
UG-W-097	Katosa matyrs shrine	Among the 22 martyrs’ killed in 1886was a born at Katoosa St Adolf Tibeyalirwa Abwooli. A pilgrimage is held every 27 January every year in memory of the victim on At Adolf day. Katoosa Parish.					Upload an image
UG-W-098	Mwenge ancestral Palace						Upload an image
UG-W-099	Bakers fort Masindi	Also known as Fort Baker. It was completed in 1872. The stone structure around the fort symbolizes Sir Samuel Baker's exceptional effort against ending slavery in this area	Masindi				More images Upload another image
UG-W-100	Kihande						Upload an image
UG-W-101	Kinogozi tombs	Oyo Nyimba Kabamba Iguru.					Upload an image
UG-W-102	Butiaba landing site	Landing port for ships plying lake Albert since 1880					Upload an image
UG-W-103	Kikonko Monument	Site where supervisor was killed by an elephant.					Upload an image
UG-W-104	Foweiras Fort	Established by Grant( Murchison falls)					Upload an image
UG-W-105	Magungo Fort	?					Upload another image
UG-W-106	Polish refuge camp	At Nyabyeya in 1945					More images Upload another image
UG-W-107	Omukamas Royal mile	Omukamas royal mile in Budongo forest					Upload an image
UG-W-108	Rwabudongo	Training ground for senior army officers for Bunyoro Kingdom.					Upload an image
UG-W-109	Rwabugoma	Training grounds for senior officers.					Upload an image
UG-W-110	Parra stone age site	Murchison falls national park.					Upload an image
UG-W-111	Bakers view kyangwali	1864 baker sites Muttanzige					Upload an image
UG-W-112	Ongo Forest	Traditional cultural resource					Upload an image
UG-W-113	Motokayi Forest	Traditional cultural resource					Upload an image
UG-W-114	Ewafara Forest	Traditional cultural resource					Upload an image
UG-W-115	Tengele Forest	Traditional cultural resource					Upload an image
UG-W-116	Kalongo Estteforest	Traditional cultural resource					Upload an image
UG-W-117	Keith Bitamazires Forest	Traditional cultural resource					Upload an image
UG-W-118	Alimugonza Forest	Traditional cultural resource					Upload an image
UG-W-119	Maganaga Forest	Traditional cultural resource					Upload an image
UG-W-120	Kapeka Foest	Traditional cultural resource					Upload an image
UG-W-121	Bweyorere capital site	Ankole capital site, occupied by rulers of Ankole, Kasasara mid 17th century and Kasasara 18th century.	Isingiro	kikagati Trading centre, 26 kilometers from Mbarara using Mbarara-Kitagati route and located nearly three quarter kilometers, off Mbarara-Kikagati route, when heading to Rwanda, Kabale road			Upload an image
UG-W-122	Nuwa Mbaguta memorial	Monument in the memory of the Late Nuwa Mbaguta the Prime Minister (Enganzi) of Ankole. Within Mbarara town, there is the peace memorial site the parade square just in front of the old police headquarters and the Ntare Stanley memorial site around Mbarara central government prison.	Mbarara	Kamukuzi Division Head Quarters, Mbarara City			More images Upload another image
UG-W-123	Kakiika historical site						Upload an image
UG-W-124	Nkokonjeru Tombs	burial place for the last two Abagabe (kings of Ankole) that is Edward Solomon Kahaya II and Sir Charles Godfrey Rutahaba Gasyonga II. External to the main tombs are about 9 graves of other royals	Mbarara	At Kakiika, 3 and half kilometers west of Mbarara city			More images Upload another image
UG-W-125	Mugaba Palace, Kamukuzi	At Kamukuzi, is found the Royal Palace of Nkore.					More images Upload another image
UG-W-126	Amabare go Omugore	At Rwekikoma, Legendaly Cwezi story rocks.	Kiruhura	Past Kazo, Before Rwemikoma health centre			Upload an image
UG-W-127	Buchunku stanley	This is where the famous explorer H.M. Stanley made blood brotherhood with Buchunku on 23 July 1889. Buchunku represented the King of Nkore, Ntare ‘V’	Mbarara	24 kilometers from Mbarara using Mbarara-Kitagati route			Upload an image
UG-W-128	?		Mitooma				Upload an image
UG-W-129	?		Ntoroko				Upload an image
UG-W-130	Bugona tree	Active shrine	Ntugamo				Upload an image
UG-W-131	Karegyeya Rock shelter						More images Upload another image
UG-W-132	Rukarango tilting rock, rock shelter and Gong						More images Upload another image
UG-W-133	Rutobo Palace( kami kya Nyawera)						Upload an image
UG-W-134	Queen Muhumuzas seat of Mpororo	Led a rebellion against the British colonialists in Mpororo is her footprint and Omweeso board in the rock.					Upload an image
UG-W-135	Kyafoora Hot springs	Near lake Nyabuhoko, in Rwashamire are the cultural curative hot springs.					More images Upload another image
UG-W-136	?		Rubirizi				Upload an image
UG-W-137	Kisizi water falls	Located on River, Rushoma, Kyabamba and Lake Bunyonyi. Traditionally, the Bakiga premarital pregnant girls were dumped at these sites. And the Girls whose legs and arms were weak would be rolled over the 15 meters high waterfalls or thrown into the deep Crater Lake. The practice has however stopped as the church of Uganda was set up the Kisiizi hospital in 1958.	Rukungiri				More images Upload another image
UG-W-138	Nyabugoto caves						Upload an image
UG-W-139	Ihimbo hot spring	curative					Upload an image
UG-W-140	Minera hot spring	Curative					Upload an image
UG-W-141	?		Sheema				Upload an image

== See also ==
- National Cultural Sites in Uganda for other National Cultural Sites in Uganda
- Isunga Cultural Community in Uganda for a great cultural experience in Fortportal
