= Omugamba =

Long stick given out on a Okuhingira ceremony in Western Uganda tribes

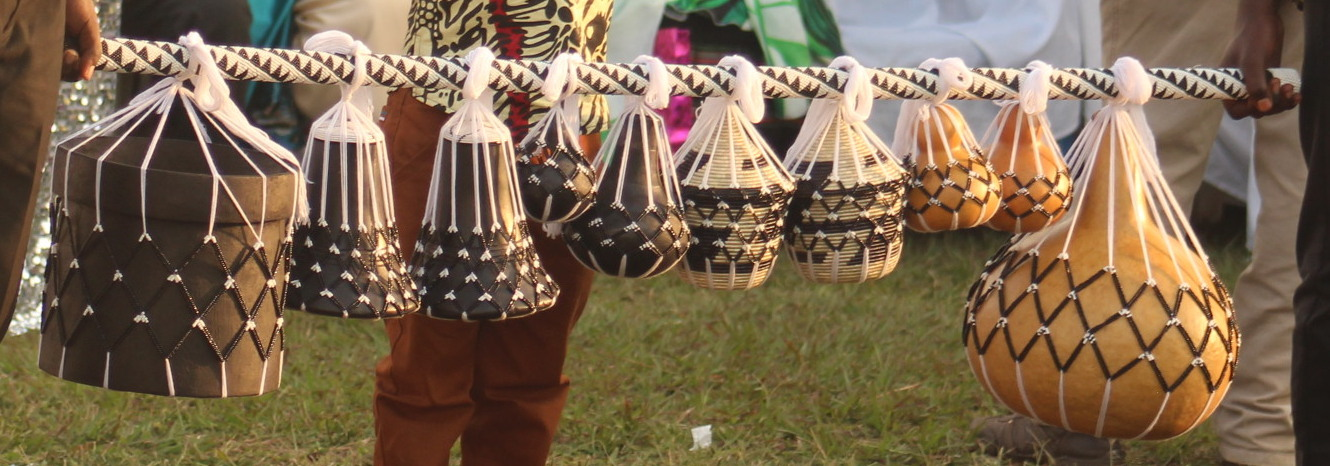
Omugamba

Omugamba is a long stick used in Okuhingira ceremony in Western Uganda tribes especially Bahima, and Banyankore to display and transport various items during the ceremony. The stick is given to the daughter by the parents in form of gifts to help her start a new home.

== Items found on omugamba ==
=== Ebyanzi (milk pots) ===
Ebyanzi are wooden vessels (milk pots) made from smoked black wood, they are covered with handmade covers called emihaiha and are wooven using sisal fibers and other fibers designed in a geometric pattern. There also smoked using emburara which is a grass type that can give good aroma and preserve milk.

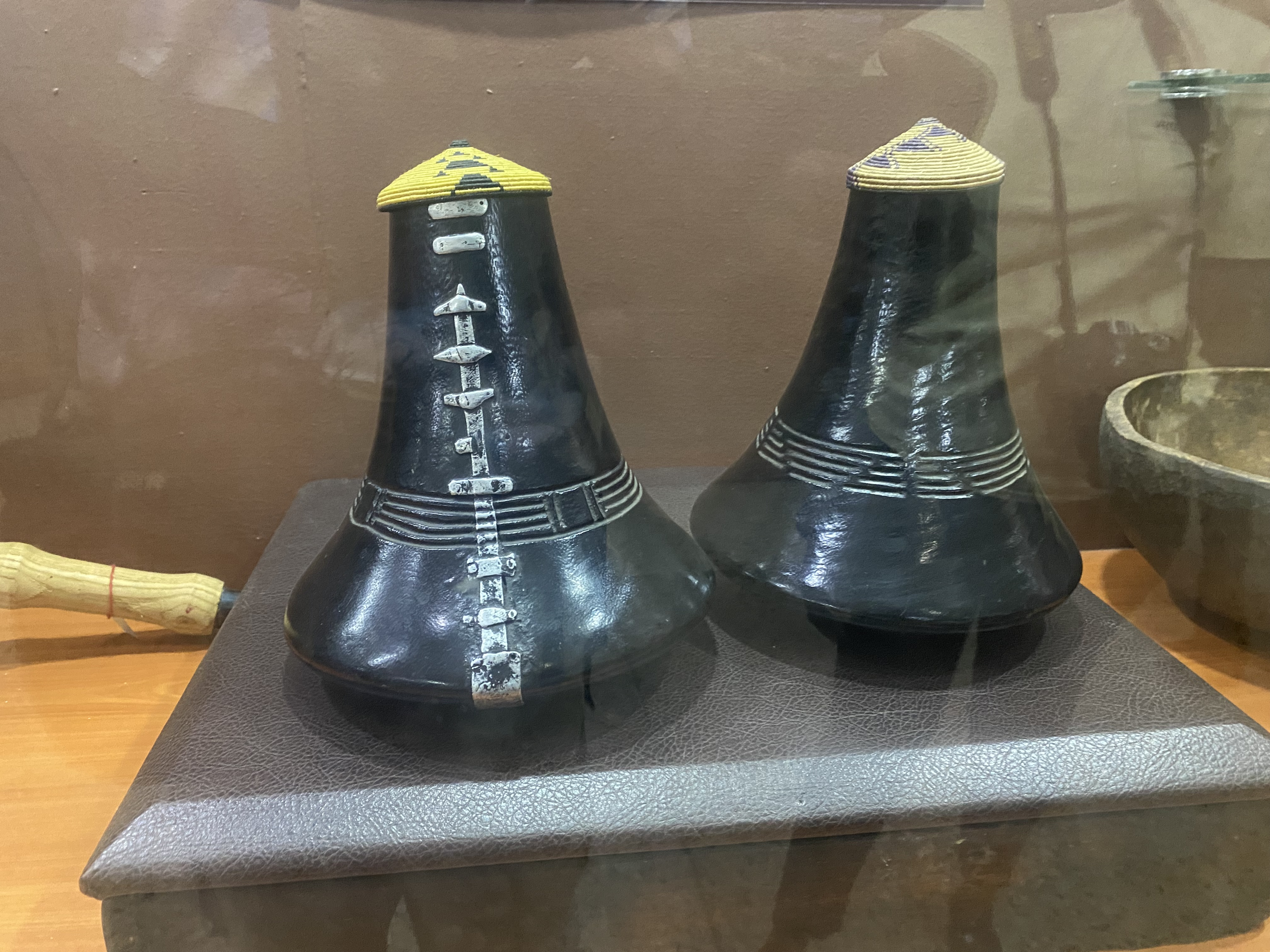
Ebyanzi

Ebyanzi are for storing, milking and serving milk. Ebyanzi are gifted by the parent to he

r daughter depending on the number of cows paid as dowry.

=== Ekirere ===
Ekirere is a calabash gifted to the daughter by her parents to be used for drinking skimmed milk or preparing amakamo (yoghurt)

=== Ekishaabo ===
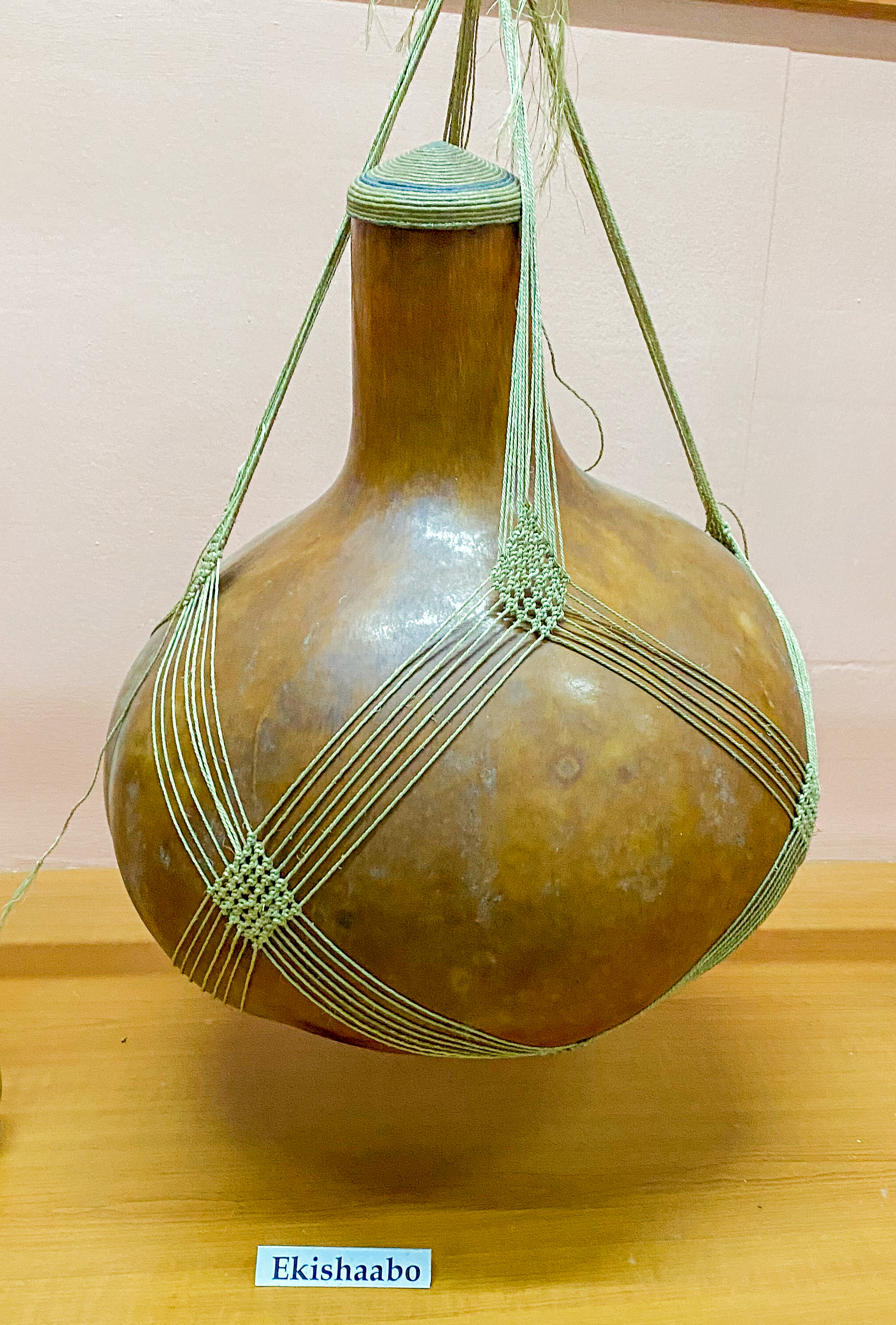
Ekishaabo

Ekishaabo is a calabash used to ferment milk into yoghurt before being transformed into ghee.

=== Engyemeko ===
Engyemeko is a pot made from clay and burnt under a high temperature which is used to store warm water for the family head for washing his hand and face.

=== Eicuba ===
Eicuba is a bucket shaped wooden utensil used for collecting water and drawing to the drinking container used by cows for drinking water.

=== Rukomyo ===
Rukomyo is a pot made from clay with three openings which is used in steaming by women. Women use the perfumed pot for body hygiene, this done by putting herbs in the pot and burining in order to produce perfumed smoke which is used by women.

=== Ekicunga ===
Ekicunga is a pot made from clay soil and burnt, its used to sterilize pots which store milk.

=== Akacwende ===
Akacwende ia a calabash where women keep petroleum jelly made from perfumed ghee. The jelly is made from mixing ghee with scented herbs.

=== Enkuyo ===
Enkuyo is a broom shaped broomstick made from sisal fibers which is used to chase away flies from the cow during milking.

=== Emboha ===
Emboha is a rope used to tie the behind legs of a cow when milking. Emboha is made from sisal fibers.

== Custom of Omugamba ==
During okuhingira, omugamba is carried by the bride brothers from the family house where its stored to the kuhingira ceremony place.

Omugamba is the main gift given during the kuhingira and without it the bridegroom father doesnot accept the emihigiro (gifts) given to him by the bride family.

== Cultural Significance ==
Omugamba is given to the daughter by the parent as an honor and acknowledgement of her transition from a girl to a woman and wife.

Omugamba is used to make family bond between the two families. the stick is kept by the groom's father.

== See also ==
- Ebyevugo
- Eshabwe
- Igongo Cultural Museum
