= Folk poetry =

Oral tradition in folklore

Folk poetry (sometimes referred to as poetry in action) is poetry that is part of a society's folklore, usually part of their oral tradition. When sung, folk poetry becomes a folk song.

== Description ==
Folk poetry in general has several characteristics. It may be informal and unofficial, generally lacks an owner and may "belong" to the society, and its telling may be an implicitly social activity. The term can refer to poems of an oral tradition that may date back many years; that is, it is information that has been transmitted over time (between generations) only in spoken (and non-written) form. Thus as an oral tradition folk poetry requires a performer to promulgate it over generations.

The definition can also be extended to include not just oral epics, but latrinalia, many forms of childlore (skipping-rope rhymes, the words of counting-out games etc.), and limericks; as well as including anonymous or improvised poems.

Narrative folk poetry is often characterized by repetition, a focus on a single event (within an overall epic narrative if present), and an impersonal narration, as well as use of exaggeration and contrast.

It is thought that epics such as The Iliad, and The Odyssey derive from, or are modeled on earlier folk-poetic forms.

== Forms and works ==
=== Regional or societal forms ===
- Landay, Afghan single couplet poems
- Zajal, Arab folk poetry form
- Bylina, east Slavic oral epic narratives
- Pantun, Malay poetic form
- Ebyevugo, Ugandan poetic form

=== Collections ===
- Classic of Poetry, ancient Chinese collection of folk poetry
- Reliques of Ancient English Poetry collected by Bishop Thomas Percy
- Minstrelsy of the Scottish Border, collected by Walter Scott.
- Danmarks gamle Folkeviser, collection of Danish ballads.

=== Derivative works ===
Many poets have worked in the style of, or imitated, folk poetry. These include Johann Gottfried Herder, Walter Scott, and Johan Ludvig Runeberg, and others.

== See also ==
- Ethnopoetics, the science of collection of folk poetry
- Elias Lönnrot, collector of Finnish folk poems, edited into the epic Kalevala.
