= List of National Cultural Sites in Northern Region, Uganda =

This article contains a list of National Cultural Sites in the Northern Region of Uganda as defined by the Uganda Museum. The official list is not published online.

== List of monuments ==
| ID | Site name | Description | District | Location | Original function | Coordinates | Image |
|---|---|---|---|---|---|---|---|
| UG-N-001 | R. Kirkpatricks monument, | At Nyakwai hills (8) British emissaries led by Kirkpatrick were killed by Nyakwai in 1897. | Abim | | | | Upload an image |
| UG-N-002 | Pekele Hot springs | Hot springs medicinal | Adjumani | | | | Upload an image |
| UG-N-003 | Idrian missionary site | First site for catholic missionaries in Pekele. 1911 | | | | | Upload an image |
| UG-N-004 | Paimol Martyrs site | Pilgrim site for the two martyrs’, Daudi Okello, and Blessed Jildo Irwa, martyred in 1918, beatified in 2010. | Agago | | | | Upload an image |
| UG-N-005 | Abia | Colonialists Massacred civilians for resisting their rule. | Aleptong | | | | Upload an image |
| UG-N-006 | ? | | Amolatar | | | | Upload an image |
| UG-N-007 | ? | | Amudat | | | | Upload an image |
| UG-N-008 | Amuru hot springs, | Hot spring with medicinal values | Amuru | | | | More images Upload another image |
| UG-N-009 | Guru Gulu caves. | Lamogi rebellion site | | | | | More images Upload another image |
| UG-N-010 | Kal, | Palace of Rwot of Lamogi. | | | | | Upload an image |
| UG-N-011 | Atyaka memorial site | LRA massacre and cooked natives in pots. | | | | | Upload an image |
| UG-N-012 | Kungu fort/Kabalega’s market. | Hiding place for Kabalega and Mwanga | Apac | | | | Upload an image |
| UG-N-013 | Kungu Jubilee Monument | Akokoro, is a cross stone commemorating boundary crossing for Christians. First missionary house in the region. | | | | | Upload an image |
| UG-N-014 | Dr Milton Obote Memorial. | Akokoro. Birth place and burial grounds for former leader of Government. | | | | | Upload an image |
| UG-N-015 | Kwania Cultural Site | Cultural andscape. | | | | | Upload an image |
| UG-N-016 | Olum foot prints site, | At Ibuje are the foot prints rock engraving, Omweso/ Acandano village | | | | | More images Upload another image |
| UG-N-017 | ? | | Maruzi, | | | | Upload an image |
| UG-N-018 | Awino grove | At Akandano is this grove for cultural ceremonies. | | | | | Upload an image |
| UG-N-019 | Ediofe Cathedral | Catholic missionary centre established in 1917. Centre for Arua Diocese in 1959 | Arua | | | | More images Upload another image |
| UG-N-020 | Rhino Camp Ginnery | Earliest ginnery for cotton established in 1911 by Maga Maga. | | | | | Upload an image |
| UG-N-021 | Delu | Fossil site | | | | | Upload an image |
| UG-N-022 | Emmanuel Cathedral, Mvara | Anglican Church 1936(memory Trevor H. Lingley B A.british congregation of Christ( centre for Madi Diocese) | | | | | More images Upload another image |
| UG-N-023 | Ombachi monument | Monument of a mass grave of those killed by Westnile bank front rebels UNLFI (24 June 1981) | | | | | Upload an image |
| UG-N-024 | Kuluva Mission | Archaeological site of iron age period. | | | | | Upload an image |
| UG-N-025 | Olewa waterfalls | Waterfalls on river Enyau at the foothills of Mount Wati | | | | | Upload an image |
| UG-N-026 | Mountain Wati | The ancestral home of the Lugbara. | | | | | Upload an image |
| UG-N-027 | Vurra Monument | Monument/Customs border point (1937), memorial Soldiers of | | | | | Upload an image |
| UG-N-028 | ? | The "Simba" were buried here. | | | | | Upload an image |
| UG-N-029 | Fort Lugards fort | In Maracha is Mirandwa waterfalls with traditional significance | | | | | Upload an image |
| UG-N-030 | Kongai-Kabalega Monument( Agwenya village) | Monument near cave where Kabalega was captured by the British colonialists on April 9, 1899. Next is a market to commemorate Mwanga a Capture. were taken by surprise by an attack led by two Baganda collaborators : Semei Kakungulu, who was married to Mwangas Sister and Andereya Luwandagga | Dokolo | | | | Upload an image |
| UG-N-031 | Ibuje Footprints(tyen olum) | Human footsteps on Ibuje Rocks. | | | | | Upload an image |
| UG-N-032 | Kongai-Mwanga Monument | Place of Mwanga captured under a tree, 100 km from Kabalegas Monument. | | | | | Upload an image |
| UG-N-033 | Baker's Fort Patiko | The Fort was established in 1872 on Oreicho hill in Patiko sub-county by Sir Samuel Baker as an outpost of Egyptian Government, aimed at suppressing the Northern Slave Trade. | Gulu | | | | More images Upload another image |
| UG-N-034 | Keyo | | | | | | Upload an image |
| UG-N-035 | Aruu falls | | | | | | More images Upload another image |
| UG-N-036 | Jok Okalany | Tombs | | | | | Upload an image |
| UG-N-037 | Pabbo Idp camp | Ist- and largest IDP camp | | | | | Upload another image |
| UG-N-038 | Kerkwalo palace | Rwot of Acholi’s palace | | | | | Upload an image |
| UG-N-039 | Lokodi memorial site | Monument of those massacred at Lokodi | | | | | More images Upload another image |
| UG-N-040 | Kanangorock Hot spring | Springs with medicinal values | Kaabong | | | | Upload an image |
| UG-N-041 | Fadibek (Emin Pasha’s fort) | | Kitgum | | | | Upload an image |
| UG-N-042 | Wii Gweng Namakora Monument, Palameny central village, Paluo parish, Omiya Anyoma sub county | Ugandas National Liberation Army (UNLA ) soldiers of the 35th battalion on 17–19 August 1986, had just arrived in the area after the overflow of Gen, Tito Okello government in search of fleeing ruminants. | | | | | Upload an image |
| UG-N-043 | Wii Gweng, Mucwini Memorial | i)Liberation war, ii) also archbishop Jonan Luwum burial site commemorated 16 February 2015" | | | | | Upload an image |
| UG-N-044 | Awere Hills | A hill where Kony gets his powers from an existing well. He last visited the well in 2011.. | | | | | Upload an image |
| UG-N-045 | Agoro Agu | Forest reserve | | | | | Upload an image |
| UG-N-046 | Amin Dada Home | Ancestral Home of Idi Amin Dada | Koboko | | | | Upload an image |
| UG-N-047 | Sultans Burial place | Burial grounds for the chiefs of the Kakwa called sultans including the father of Idi Amin. | | | | | Upload an image |
| UG-N-048 | Mt Liru | Ancestral hill of the Kakwa. | | | | | Upload an image |
| UG-N-049 | ? | Historical Landscape at the border post of south Sudan, Congo and Uganda all share a town. making up s | | | | | Upload an image |
| UG-N-050 | Adimola/Ambitambe Crater Lake. | The only known crater lake in northern Uganda, Key tourist site. | | | | | Upload an image |
| UG-N-051 | ? | | Kole | | | | Upload an image |
| UG-N-052 | Loteteleit Rock paintings | Rock art paintings/engravings. | Kotido | | | | Upload an image |
| UG-N-053 | Magosi archalogical site | Rock paintings and stone age tools. | | | | | Upload an image |
| UG-N-054 | Nakapelimoru village, Watakau. | The largest Manyatta village in East Africa designed to take care of security concerns. | | | | | Upload an image |
| UG-N-055 | Lotutur Hills | Hot springs and caves. | Lamwo | | | | Upload an image |
| UG-N-056 | Agoro Terrace walls | House platforms and walls built to create terraces 10 meters to the border of Sudan. | | | | | Upload an image |
| UG-N-057 | Nghetta and Otuke Hills | Where lango tribe first settled when they had just migrated Ethiopia. | Lira | | | | Upload an image |
| UG-N-058 | Balonyo Ogur Memorial site | In 2004 over 300 people were massacred here by LRA rebellion fighters. | | | | | Upload an image |
| UG-N-059 | Aboke Girls Memorial | Schools girls abducted by Kony in 19 | | | | | Upload an image |
| UG-N-060 | Aliqua Fort and Monument(Pyramid) | Administrative post of the Beligian Colonial Government and military Fort of the Belgium Congo colony 1894-1911. | Maracha | | | | Upload an image |
| UG-N-061 | Mirandwa Water falls | Unique steps water falls at Kijomoro. | | | | | More images Upload another image |
| UG-N-062 | Olewa water falls. | | | | | | Upload an image |
| UG-N-063 | Lotetereit Rock paintings | Rock Art Paintings. | Moroto | | | | Upload an image |
| UG-N-064 | Kalokurok | Rock slide at Kambisi. | | | | | Upload an image |
| UG-N-065 | Moroto Mountains | O | | | | | Upload an image |
| UG-N-066 | Moyo peoples hall | Old colonial building/civic centre/administrative centre. | Moyo | | | | Upload an image |
| UG-N-067 | Andrew Howard memorial | Burial grounds for two British Air Surveyors 1931. | | | | | Upload an image |
| UG-N-068 | Kotilo Sacred forest | Where Madi chiefs Opi Wayi, Bandasi Dumunu and Lodo Feliciano. | | | | | Upload an image |
| UG-N-069 | Dufile Fort | Military fort established by Sir Charles Gordon, governor of equatorial province 1874 and later occupied by Emin Pasha in 1879, to stop slave trade activities in Northern Uganda. | | | | | Upload an image |
| UG-N-070 | Opi | Madi Chiefs wives burial grounds | | | | | Upload an image |
| UG-N-071 | Moki springs | Natural Hot Springs of medicinal values. | | | | | Upload an image |
| UG-N-072 | Napeduh caves | Rock art paintings. | Nakapiripirit | | | | Upload an image |
| UG-N-073 | Acherer Gold mines | Gold mines traditionally managed by the local community. | | | | | Upload an image |
| UG-N-074 | Aksum, Iriri fossil site | Oldest paleo-anthropology site on the revolution of man 20 million years ago. | Napak | | | | Upload another image |
| UG-N-075 | Emin Pashas Fort Wadelai | Military camp established by Emin Pasha to stop slave trade 1885 . | Nebbi | | | | Upload an image |
| UG-N-076 | Wagley – Pavungu site | Pakwatch near the bridge, separation of Nyipir and Labong. | | | | | Upload an image |
| UG-N-077 | Nyadwar-Wang jok | Site with Alur Regalia and of Ritual importance | | | | | Upload an image |
| UG-N-078 | Lojudong | Burial grounds for Nyapir and two mother chiefs. | | | | | Upload an image |
| UG-N-079 | Panyimur Hot Springs | Hot Springs near Panyimur. | | | | | Upload an image |
| UG-N-080 | Andoros Drums | At Opano, are 3 big clusters of granite rocks outcrop that were sounded by Ndoro who travelled to Congo and never returned. | | | | | Upload an image |
| UG-N-081 | Lateng Hills | At Anyayo, Paidha are sacrificial hill on top rock and rainmaking ceremonies performed. | | | | | Upload an image |
| UG-N-082 | Pacego | Fossil site | | | | | Upload an image |
| UG-N-083 | Panyimur fossil site | | | | | | Upload an image |
| UG-N-084 | Gengere Fosiil site | | | | | | Upload an image |
| UG-N-085 | Jupadwonga fossil site | Late Miocene sites 8 to 11million years. | | | | | Upload an image |
| UG-N-086 | Marama fossil site | | | | | | Upload an image |
| UG-N-087 | Attala fossil site | | | | | | Upload an image |
| UG-N-088 | Nyabang | | | | | | Upload an image |
| UG-N-089 | ARAWIPATENG | | | | | | Upload an image |
| UG-N-090 | Jupa combe | | | | | | Upload an image |
| UG-N-091 | Monument of the 1st police superintendent | | Nwoya | | | | Upload an image |
| UG-N-092 | ? | | Otuke | | | | Upload an image |
| UG-N-093 | ? | | Oyam | | | | Upload an image |
| UG-N-094 | Aruu falls | Naturally Scenic hills. | Pader | | | | More images Upload another image |
| UG-N-095 | Wii-polo martyrs’ shrine . | Graves of Daudi Okello and Jildo Irwa matyrs WII Polo Church.Paimol. | | | | | Upload an image |
| UG-N-096 | Agbinika Water falls | Water falls on river Koch granitic rock. | Yumbe | | | | Upload an image |
| UG-N-097 | Romogi iron site | Pit shafts of the late iron age mining Archaeological site | | | | | Upload an image |
| UG-N-098 | Bidi bidi peace camp | Ikafe camp that hosted the south Sudanese refugees | | | | | Upload an image |
| UG-N-099 | Ambala Cultural site. | At Kei Sub county headquarters. | | | | | Upload an image |
| UG-N-100 | Nyanjoto | Alur settlement point | Zombo | | | | Upload an image |
| UG-N-101 | Aluka Cultural Site | At Warr-Aluka, is the burial place of Rwoth Nziri set under a huge Banyan fig tree and also a memorial site for his son and successor, Alworunga who was set ablaze and burnt to ashes by the Panduru from Congo. | | | | | Upload an image |
| UG-N-102 | Kaal Atyak-Winam | At Atyak is the Alur kingdom palace and chief's burial grounds | | | | | Upload an image |

== See also ==
- National Cultural Sites in Uganda for other National Cultural Sites in Uganda
