= Ensi Nkore =

Anthem of Ankole

"Ensi Nkore" ("Our Land Ankole") was the official anthem of the Nkore Kingdom. It was sung whenever the Kingdom functions were about to begin. Various Kingdom activists and royalties sung this song before official ceremonies, such as the Nkore Activist Group, which had an established office on Kamukuzi hill, at Mugaba House Mbarara, Uganda.

== Lyrics ==
The lyrics praise the beauty of the land of Nkore, the hills, valleys and plains as it describes the land as Kaaro Karungi.

Nkore original

I
Twena twananuka ahabw’egyo migisha
Nyamuhanga ei y’aturondeire
Okutwara ensi yaitu egi Kaaro omumaisho
Kandi n’okugyebemberagye

Chorus:
Ensi Nkore, Ensi Nkore,
Ensi Nkore, etushemeza
Katweyongyere kweshongora Ensi Nkore.
Ensi Nkore, ensi Nkore, etushemeza

II
Titurikwebwa agomamanzi agakare
Agayombekire ensi yaitu
Gakagitunguura ekagyenda omumaisho
Kandi nabagijwereire eshagama.

III
Twena twesimire ebirungi bya Kaaro
Enshozi, empita; n'emigyera
Matungo ebihingwa n'abantu abarungi
Kandi na Rubambansi Omugabe
