= Kahaya II =

Edward Suleiman Kahaya II became Omugabe of Nkore in 1895, when he was around eighteen years old. Omugabe is the title that was used for the king of Nkore. In 1901, the Kingdom of Nkore was incorporated into the British protectorate of Uganda, and was from now on the Kingdom of Ankole, compromising an area that was twice as large as the original kingdom.

The Omugabe was incorporated into the colonial framework of Ankole. Kahaya had lost his relevance and he knew it. Because his kingdom was so much expanded by the British, more than half of its citizens had never been under the rule of the Omugabe. He led a tragic life, in which he became less and less involved in matters of his kingdom. The British treated him as a little child, and in less than a few decades he was relegated from a divine ruler to an administrative clerk. Kayaha died in 1944, and he had been suffering from health problems for decades. This was probably due to his massive physical appearance: he was two metres tall and he weighed 136 kilograms. In 1918 he was made an honorary member of the Order of the British Empire for services in raising and organising native levies and local Defence Corps in the Uganda Protectorate.

He had one son Suleiman Mirindi but he was succeeded by his cousin Omugabe Gasyonga II with colonialists support

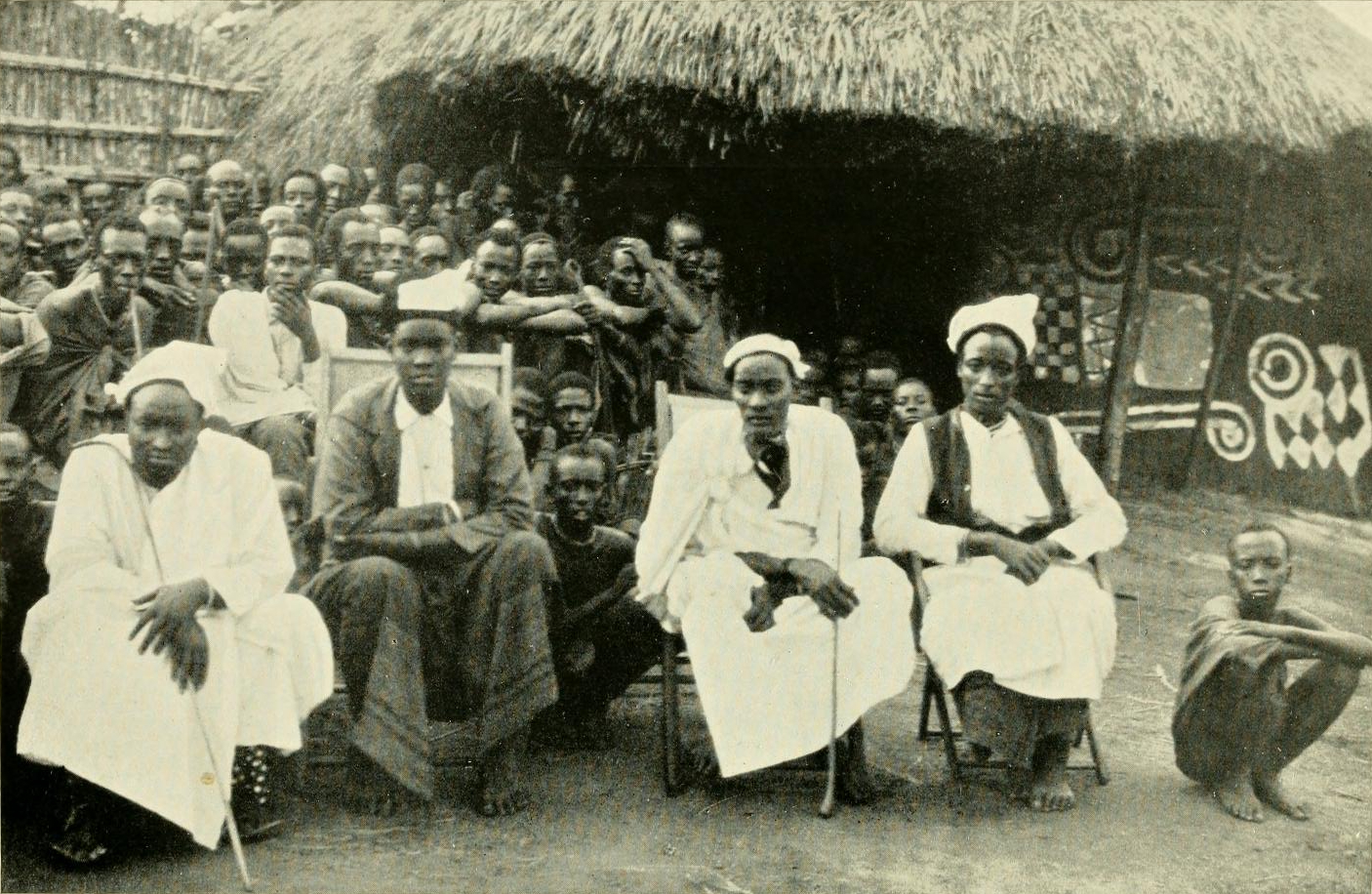
Kahaya with his counsellors, 1902
