= Ruhinda =

Ruhinda (Ruhinda rwa Njunaki) is a traditionally attested figure in the history of the Western Great Lakes region of East Africa. In oral traditions, he is regarded as the founder of the Kingdom of Ankole between the years of 1430–1446 and is also associated with early political developments in Karagwe. His life is linked to the traditions surrounding the collapse of the Empire of Kitara.

== Early life background ==
According to the oral tradition, Ruhinda was the son of Omukama Wamara ( also as known as Ndahura), remembered as the final ruler of the Kitara polity, and Njunaki, a woman of non-royal status associated with the royal household. His maternal lineage placed him outside the principal line of succession within the imperial court.

During the fragmentation of Kitara's political authority, Wamara relocated with a group of followers and established a new political center at Ntusi. Ruhinda is said to have remained behind temporarily, concealing his identity while maintaining custody of royal ritual objects associated with kingship.

== Collapse of Kitara authority ==
Oral tradition state that Ruhinda later left the former imperial center and joined his father at Ntusi, bringing with him royal insignia. Ntusi subsequently experienced a violent attack by rival forces seeking to reclaim symbols of authority. As a result of this conflict, Wamara and many of his followers were killed. His mother and a sibling survived. The destruction of Ntusi is remembered as marking the final collapse of Kitara's authority.

== Establishment of Ankole ==
Following the fall of Ntusi, Ruhinda relocated southward with surviving relatives and followers into the area later known as Nkore ( Ankole). There, he established political control over local communities and declared himself ruler of a new polity referred to in tradition as Kaaro-Karungi.

The first royal center was established at Mweruka and later relocated to Rurama. Ruhindas's son Nkuba, was born during this period and later succeeded him. These developments are traditionally regarded as the foundation of the Ankole kingdom and ruling dynasty.

== Karagwe traditions ==
Ruhinda also appears in the traditions associated with Karagwe, where he is linked to the extension or consolidation of political authority. Some accounts describe his movement into Karagwe after transferring power in Ankole, while others present Karagwe as part of earlier expansions. The sequence and interpretation of these events differ between traditions.

== Succession ==
Before departing from Ankole, Ruhinda entrusted governance to his son Nkuba. This transfer of authority established a dynasty pattern that continued in Ankole for several centuries and shaped its political institutions.

== Legacy ==
Ruhinda occupies a central place in the historical memory of Ankole and Kragwe. His legacy is reflected in royal genealogies, regional identities, and traditions concerning the emergence of centralized authority in western Great Lakes region.

== See also ==
- Ankole
- Kingdom of Karagwe
- Bunyoro
- Empire of Kitara
- Buganda
- Basoga
- Itesots

Regnal titles
| Preceded by - | Omugabe of Nkore; 1430–1446 | Succeeded by Nkuba |
