= Ankole =

Former Bantu kingdom in south-western Uganda

Kingdom of Ankole Obugabe Bw'Ankole (Nyankole)
- 1478–1967
- Flag Coat of arms
- Anthem: 'Ensi Nkore, Ensi Nkore'
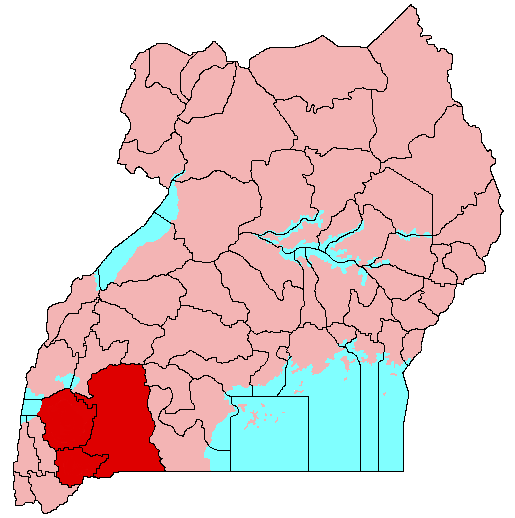
- Location of Ankole (red) in Uganda (pink).
- Status: State from 15th century–1901 Non-sovereign monarchy from 1901–1967
- Capital: Mbarara; 0°36′48″S 30°39′30″E
- Common languages: Runyankole, English
- Ethnic groups: Banyankole
- Government: Constitutional monarchy
- Omugabe
  - c. 1430–1446: Ruhinda (first)
  - 1944–1967: Gasyonga II (last)
  - 2011–present: Charles Rwebishengye
- Enganzi
  - ?–1967: James Kahigiriza (last)
  - ?–present: William Katatumba (unofficial)
- History
  - Established by Ruhinda: 1478
  - Incorporated into Protectorate of Uganda: 1901
  - Obote abolishes Uganda's traditional kingdoms: 1967

Area
  - Total: 16,104 km^{2} (6,218 sq mi)

Population
  - Estimate: 4.1 Million
- Currency: Uganda Shillings (UGX)
- Time zone: UTC+3 (EAT)
- Calling code: 256
Preceded by	Succeeded by
Empire of Kitara	Uganda

- Person: OmunyaNkore
- People: AbanyaNkore
- Language: OrunyaNkore
- Country: Obugabe Bw'Ankole

Ankole (Nkore before the colonial era) was a traditional Bantu kingdom in Uganda and lasted from the 15th century until 1967. The kingdom was located in south-western Uganda, east of Lake Edward.

== Geography ==
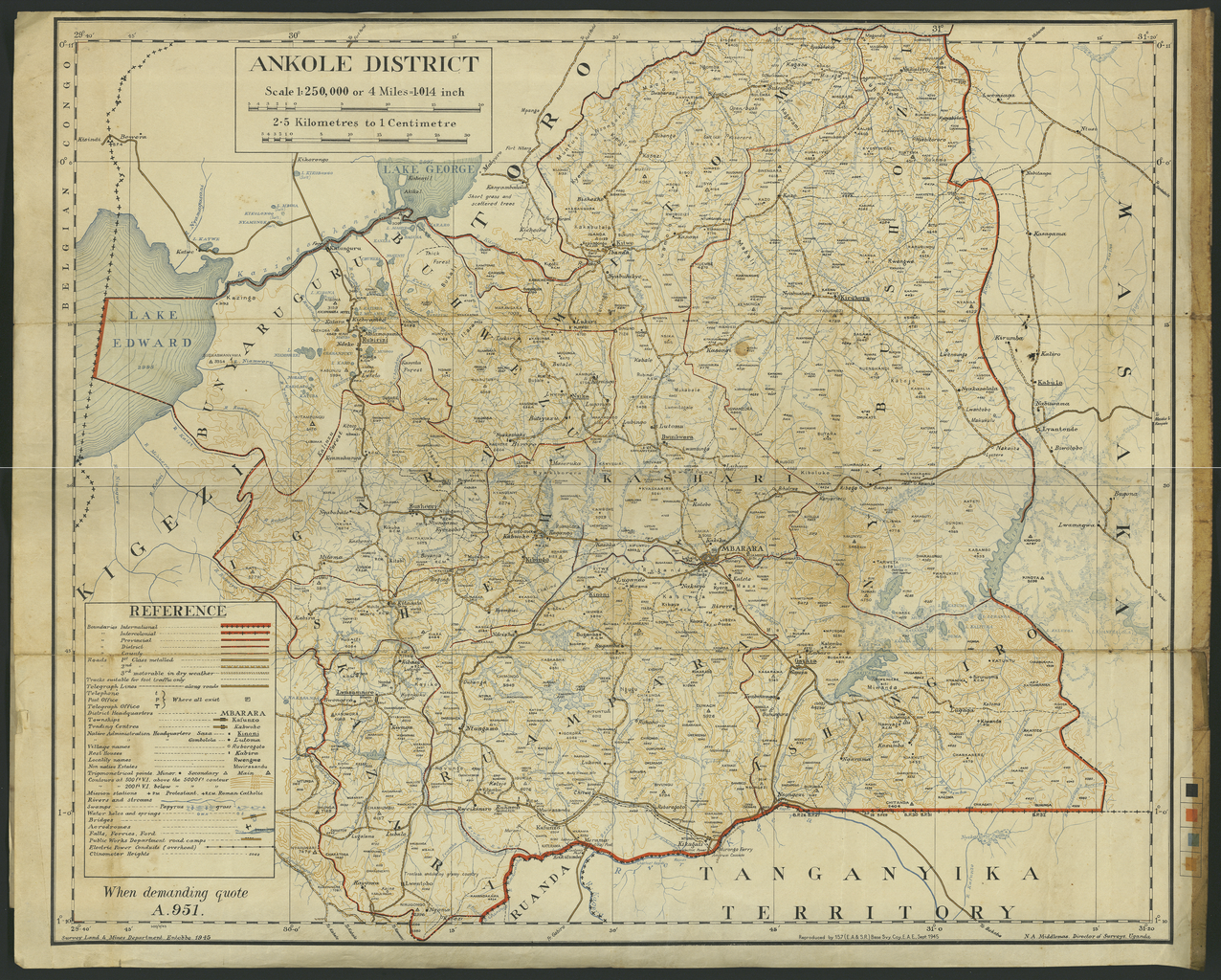
Map depicting the Kingdom of Ankole

The kingdom of Ankole is located in the South-Western region of Uganda bordering Rwanda and the Democratic Republic of Congo. Ankole is home to some of the most favorable grazing lands in Africa:

The very fact that the Hima can live almost entirely on cattle bespeaks the richness of their homeland among so many arid or semi-arid areas of primitive pastoralism in the world. In those areas reliance on cattle as a single source of subsistence is impossible; people have to turn, in addition, to other sources of food. In contrast, Himaland, called Kaaro Karungi (the good land) by both its inhabitants and their neighbours, is known for the fertility of its soil, the abundance of its pastures, and its rainfall well spread out both seasonally and perennially. It was pointed out many years ago that ‘Ankole might be called the ranchland of Uganda containing as it does mile after mile of richest pasture’.15 This bounty enables the Hima to feed their cattle well with grass during some eight months of the year, and to water them almost every day. Hence, Ankole cattle yield milk almost daily throughout the year, providing their owners’ families with a continuous food supply.

== History ==
=== Under the Empire of Kitara ===
Before the collapse of the Empire of Kitara, Nkore was a small and remote area on the edges of the empire.

=== Founding ===
According to legend, the first (and semi-legendary) king of Nkore, Ruhinda Rwa Njunaki (was the son of Wamala), was born as the illegitimate and the last king of Bachwezi kingdom. His mother was known as Njunaki and was a servant in the king's palace. The Hinda clan later took adopted Hima identity for itself in order to gain more support from the Hima pastoralists. Shrines to Wamara and Ruhinda were associated with fertility. The initial core of the kingdom was in Isingiro, 20 km south of Mbarara.

=== Colonial and post-colonial periods ===
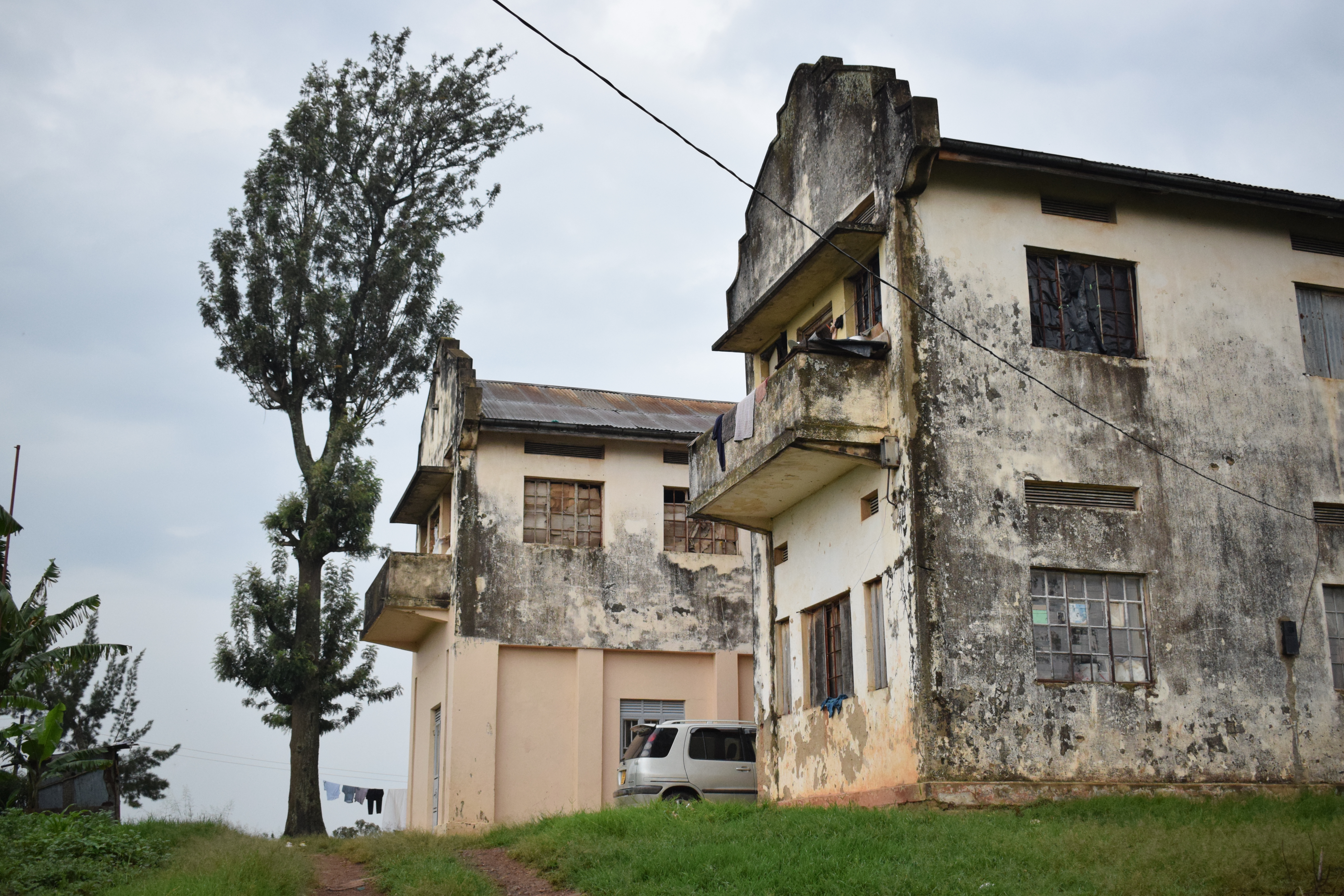
Royal Palace of Nkore, abandoned in 1967

On 25 October 1901, the Kingdom of Nkore was incorporated into the British Protectorate of Uganda by the signing of the Ankole agreement.

The kingdom was formally abolished in 1967 by the government of President Milton Obote, and since then, the kingdom has not been restored officially.

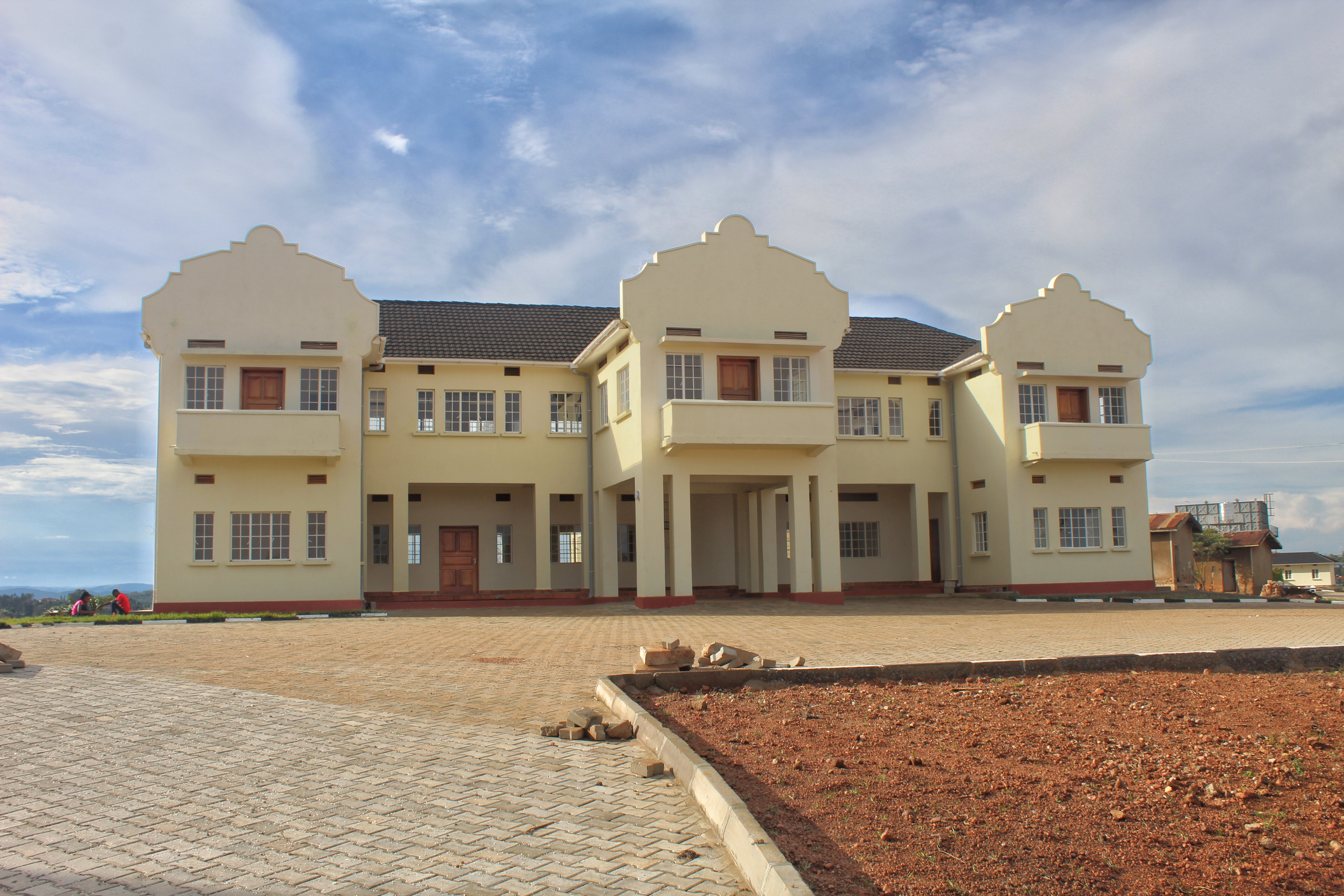
The now renovated Palace of the Omugabe

Because of the reorganisation of the country by Idi Amin, Ankole no longer exists as an administrative unit. It is divided into ten districts, namely: Bushenyi District, Buhweju District, Mitooma District, Rubirizi District, Sheema District, Ntungamo District, Mbarara District, Kiruhura District, Ibanda District, and Isingiro District.

== Culture and society ==
=== Organization ===
Nkore society evolved into a system of ranked statuses, where even among the cattle-owning elite, patron-client ties were important in maintaining social order. Men gave cattle to the king (mugabe) to demonstrate their loyalty and to mark life-cycle changes or victories in cattle raiding. This loyalty was often tested by the king's demands for cattle or for military service. In return for homage and military service, a man received protection from the king, both from external enemies and from factional disputes with other cattle owners.

The Emitwe leaders (commanders of the basic military units) were the second most powerful group after the Mugabe in Ankole. They spent most of their time in court when not fighting. They had their encampments (amacumbi) near the palace but not in it. The Emitwe leaders were also the top regional administrators. Their chief duties were to mobilize their warriors in times of war and to lead them in the actual fighting and also to carry out the duties of civil administration during times of peace. Their official positions and personal standing made them the most influential single group in court since their advice was sought on most matters of public policy. The leaders of the emitwe could be either Iru or Hima.

The reign of Ntare V is full of examples of famous Bairu emitwe leaders, such as Ruhara, who was also a regional chief. Ruharu was a close friend of King Ntare V. He gained great fame and renown because of the leading part he played in conquering large parts of Rwampara County, which was previously part of the Mpororo kingdom. Ruhara, together with other Iru such as Koyokoma and Rwankwiiziire, played the leading role in traveling across Nkore to stop the flow of people fleeing Nkore after the death of Ntare V, showing their great influence and personal standing in the society.

=== Iru and Hima relations ===
Nkore society was composed of the Iru (pl. Bairu) and Hima (pl. Bahima). The Iru were cultivators who had some cattle while the Hima were those engaged almost exclusively in pastoralism (often having herds in the many dozens or even hundreds). The Bairu and Bahima did not have many opportunities to mix much due to the simple fact that they had different lifestyles which did not give them much time left for communal leisure gatherings. The Bairu engaged in the cultivation of finger millet like, the building of homesteads, brewing beer, and the hunting of wild game for meat, which the Bahima (except for beer drinking did not engage in. The Hima settled a specific region of marshlands which was mostly devoid of population, with only a few scattered agriculturalists living there. There were virtually no contacts between the two groups.

In Nkore, it was believed that that "obwiru" [the state of being a Mwiru] was poverty; he who was poor was a Mwiru; he who was rich was a Muhima. Marko Kiiza of the Kingdom of Igara says:

Nkore is confusing because it was mixed up through intermarriage. There were the Abambari—these were people on the way to becoming Bahima. They were emerging from the obwiru. They no longer did any cultivation as they would have acquired herds of cattle. By that stage, they would also have married from the Bahima families. It was the criterion of affluence that determined obuhima [the state of being a Muhima]. For if you can count up to three generations of affluent ancestors in succession, you cannot then go back to the Bairu. Let me now give you the example of these Basingo [a clan name] like Rwabigongi. Their grandfathers were Bairu, but now look at them; are they are not Bahima? They are completely gone (that is to say that they are regarded as pure Bahima by everyone

A number of social pressures worked to destroy Hima domination of Nkore. Miscegenation took place despite prohibitions on intermarriage, and children of these unions (abambari) often demanded their rights as cattle owners, leading to feuding and cattle-raiding. From what is present-day Rwanda groups launched repeated attacks against the Hima during the nineteenth century. To counteract these pressures, several Hima warlords recruited Bantu men into their armies to protect the southern borders of Nkore.

Aili M. Tripp describes the role of women in the kingdom of Nkore:

In Ankole, female chiefs were common at the turn of the century. In fact, the only female gombolola chief appointed by the British administration, Julia Kibubura, was from Ankole. Women leaders were sometimes credited with extraordinary powers. Ankole was renowned for its female diviners who included well-known women like Murogo, Nyatuzana, Kyishokye and Kibubwa. For example, the king (mugabe) Rwebishengye appointed the famous diviner Murogo to work for him as a spy on the Banyoro north of Katonga. Murogo and her female descendants were allegedly able to turn themselves into cows and mingle with the cattle herds of the enemy and they worked for the kings for several generation in the Ibanda area

== Military ==
The Iru were able to join the army and even lead army units (emitwe). Bairu warriors were considered far superior to the ordinary Iru farmers and also to the ordinary Hima (who were derisively called "tick eaters"). Bairu leaders of the emitwe were as equal as the Bahima who held the same office and were of greater standing than those Bairu or Bahima who did not. Poems and songs of praise were sung about the exploits of Iru warriors against the rival Kingdom of Rwanda.

Kananura, a member of the Hororo people, speaks of the military organization of Nkore: "A war expedition without the Bairu could not be contemplated or be successful. The Omukama used to call out all his male subjects to fight if there was a war to be fought."

An Iru named Katare (son of Kobengo) was one of the most famous warriors during the reign of Ntare IV, and his praises are still sung in Ankole today;

"You redeemed Nyinamashazi with your arrow when he was interned in Buganda. You are the Mwiru, the rest are pickers of weeds; You are the Musingo (by clan), the others are merely gatherers of ashes.You are the One whose weapon is the arrow, the others use wood (of which the arrow shafts were made) only to make fire".

== List of Abagabe of Ankole ==
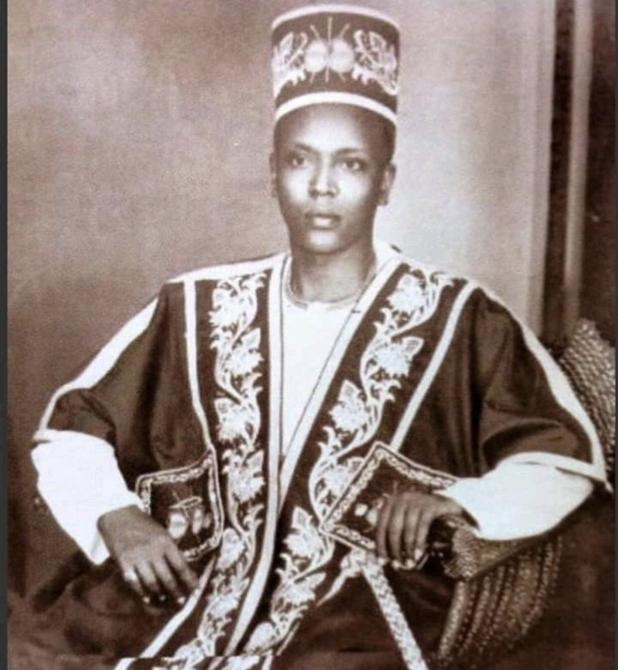
Omugabe Gasyonga of Ankore

Names and dates up to 1967 taken from John Stewart's African States and Rulers.

Name	Reign dates	Notes
Ruhinda	c. 1430–1446	
Nkuba	c. 1446–1475	
Nyaika	c. 1475–1503	
Nyabugaro Ntare I	c. 1503–1531	
Rushango	c. 1531–1559	
Ntare II Kagwejegyerera	c. 1559–1587	
Ntare III Rugaamba	c. 1587–1615	
Kasasira	c. 1615–1643	
Kitera	c. 1643–1671	Joint rulers.
Kumongye	c. 1643–1671	Joint rulers.
Mirindi	c. 1671–1699	
Ntare IV Kitabanyoro	c. 1699–1727	
Macwa	c. 1727–1755	
Rwabirere	c. 1755–1783	Joint rulers.
Karara	c. 1755–1783	Joint rulers.
Karaiga	c. 1755–1783	Joint rulers.
Kahaya I	c. 1783–1811	Joint rulers.
Nyakashaija	c. 1783–1811	Joint rulers.
Bwarenga	c. 1783–1811	Joint rulers.
Rwebishengye	c. 1783–1811	Joint rulers.
Rwebishengye	c. 1811–1839	Joint rulers.
Kayunga	c. 1811–1839	Joint rulers.
Gasiyonga I	c. 1811–1839	Joint rulers.
Mutambuka	c. 1839–1867	
Ntare V	c. 1867–1895	
Kahaya II	1895–1944	Monarchy placed under the Uganda Protectorate in 1896.
Gasiyonga II	1944–8 September 1967	Monarchy abolished in 1967.
Ntare VI	1993–2011	Titular king.
Charles Rwebishengye	2011–present	Titular king.

== Nkole people ==
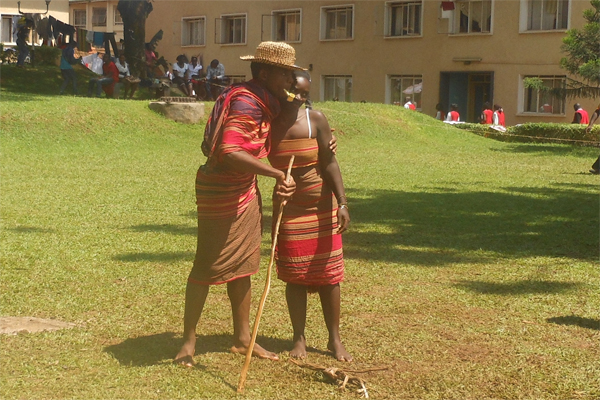
Nkole people

Nkole people are a Bantu ethnic group native to Uganda. They primarily inhabit Ankole. They are closely related to other Bantu peoples of the region, namely the Nyoro, Kiga, Tooro and Hema peoples. Their population is 4,187,445 (9.8% of Uganda).People from Ankole region are referred to as “Banyankore”.

The Banyankore speak Orunyankore, a Great Lakes Bantu language. There were an estimated 12.3 million native speakers in 2014.

== Counties of Nkole (Amashaza) ==
Nkore Kingdom was divided into ten counties. These counties are now divided into various political constituencies. But the original ten counties of Nkore include:

- Kashari
- Isingiro
- Rwampara
- Nyabushozi
- Ibanda
- Sheema
- Kajjara
- Bunyaruguru
- Igara Bushenyi
- Buhweju

== Nkole calendar ==
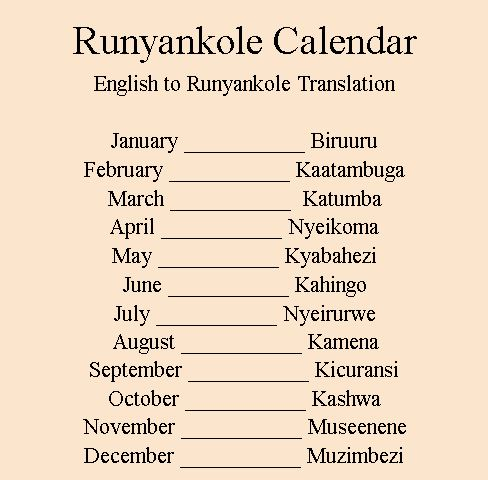
Runyakore Calendar: English to Runyakore Translation

The Nkore calendar was divided into 12 months. They were named according to weather conditions and activities done in that period. They include:

- Biruuru
- Kaatambuga
- Katumba
- Nyeikoma
- Kyabahezi
- Kahingo
- Nyeirurwe
- Kamena
- Kicuransi
- Kashwa
- Museenene
- Muzimbezi

== See also ==
- Ebyevugo, Ankole poetry form
- Nkole people
- Nkole lunguage
- Lake Edward
- Igongo Cultural Centre and Museum, site of Ankole cultural heritage preservation
