= National Cultural Sites of Uganda =

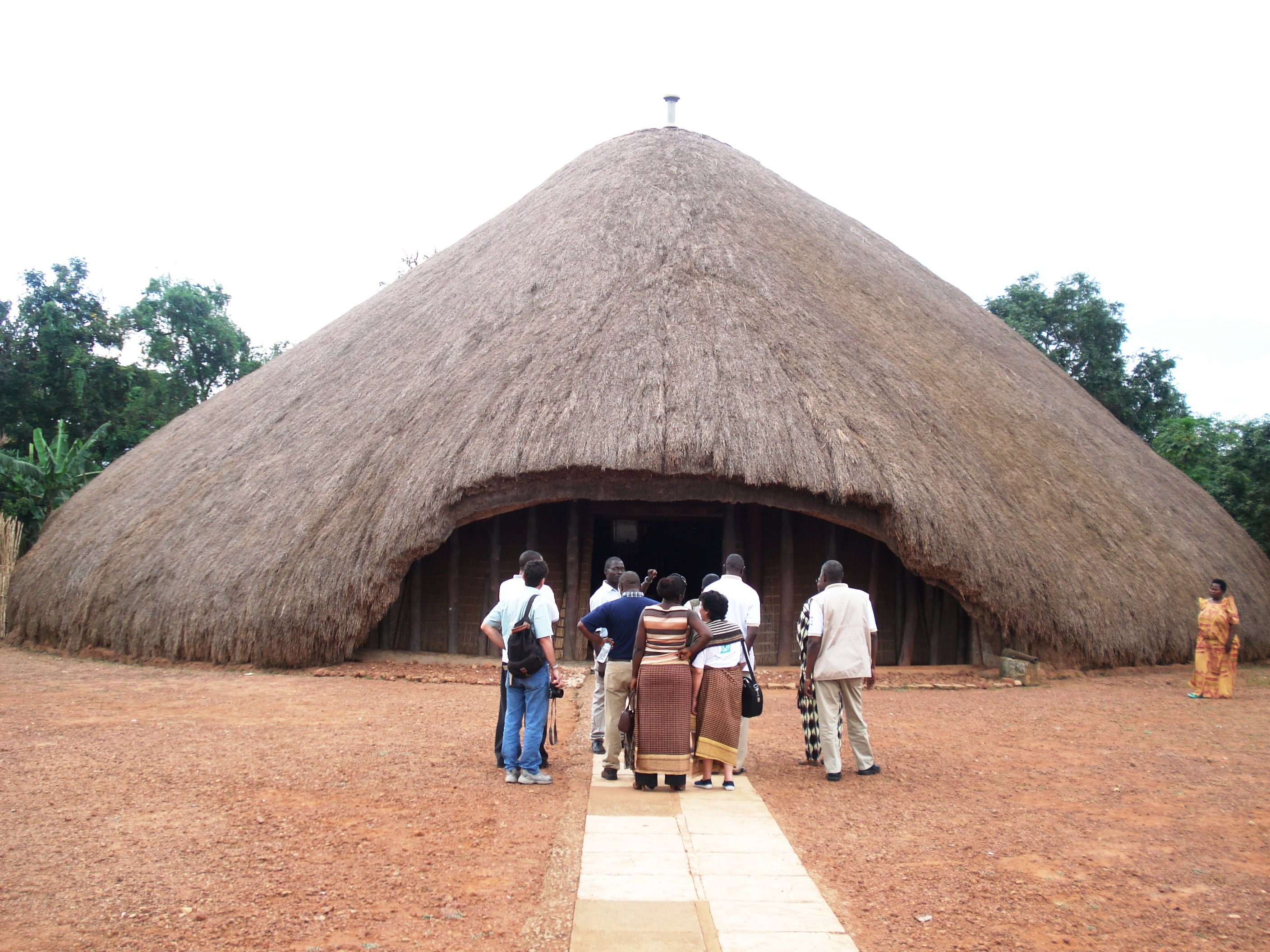
kasubi tombs

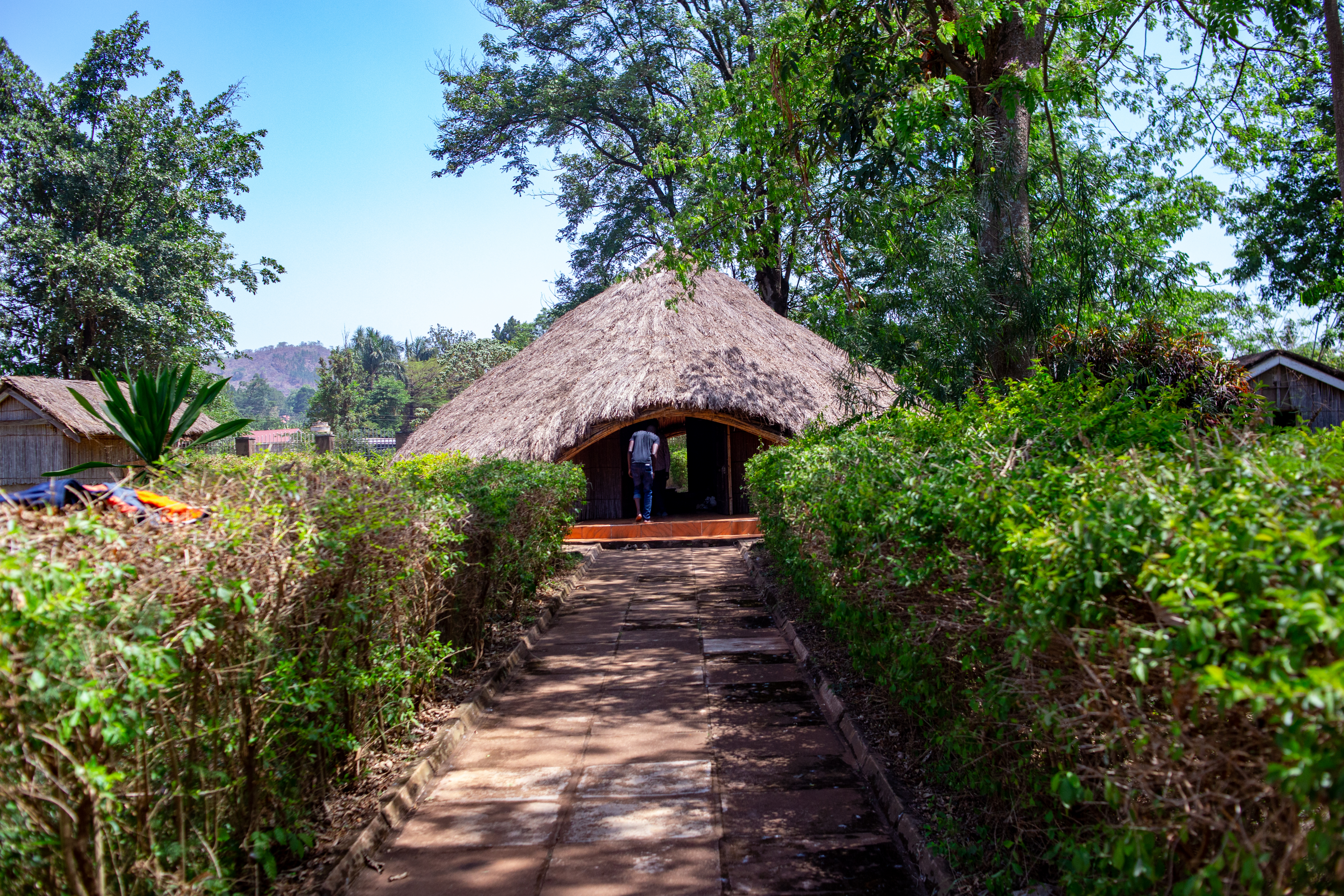
Mparo Royal Tombs of Bunyoro as seen from outside

National Cultural Sites of Uganda are a type of cultural heritage monuments, defined by the Uganda Museum. The sites are subdivided by administrative region and listed below.

- List of National Cultural Sites in Central Region, Uganda
- List of National Cultural Sites in Western Region, Uganda
- List of National Cultural Sites in Eastern Region, Uganda
- List of National Cultural Sites in Northern Region, Uganda
