= Igongo Cultural Centre and Museum =

Museum in Mbarara, Uganda

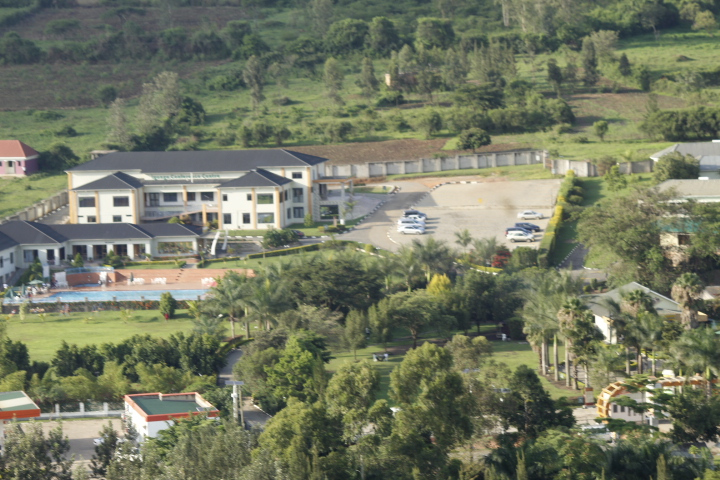

- Map of Uganda showing the location of Igongo Cultural Centre and Museum.
- Established: 2003
- Location: Mbarara City in Western Uganda
- Coordinates: 0°31′17.0″S 30°44′26.4″E
- Type: Historical
- Founder: Apollo Karugaba
- Website: igongo.co.ug

Igongo Cultural Centre and Museum is a community museum and cultural heritage complex situated approximately 12 km from Mbarara city in western Uganda, along the Mbarara–Masaka highway. Established in 2003, it aims to preserve, celebrate, and share the cultural legacy of the Ankole region and other western Ugandan communities.

== History ==
Igongo was founded in 2003 by entrepreneur and historian Apollo Karugaba, on what was formerly a royal gathering site for the Ankole kingdom. The centre has since grown into both a premier cultural destination and a luxury hospitality venue, winning the Global Hospitality and Luxury Award (2024) as the most luxurious cultural resort in East and Central Africa.

== Key attractions and features ==
=== Eriijukiro Museum ===
The Eriijukiro Museum houses extensive collections of artifacts from southwestern Uganda, including regalia of the Ankole monarchy, traditional tools, attire, and photographic exhibits.

=== Itaramiro Cultural Village ===
The Itaramiro Cultural Village recreates traditional homesteads of pastoralist and agrarian communities, with demonstrations of practices such as milking, food processing, and crafting.

=== Biharwe Eclipse Monument ===
Nearby stands the Biharwe Eclipse Monument, inaugurated in 2014 to commemorate the solar eclipse of 1520 AD, an event that shaped regional politics.

=== Other facilities ===
Igongo also hosts the Nkwanzi Craft Shop, restaurants serving traditional Ankole cuisine such as eshabwe (ghee sauce) and karo (millet bread), a country hotel, health club, and event spaces.

== Tourism and significance ==
Igongo is a popular stopover for tourists en route to Lake Mburo National Park, Queen Elizabeth National Park, and Bwindi Impenetrable National Park. It also serves as a community hub by creating employment and promoting regional artisans.

=== Gallery ===
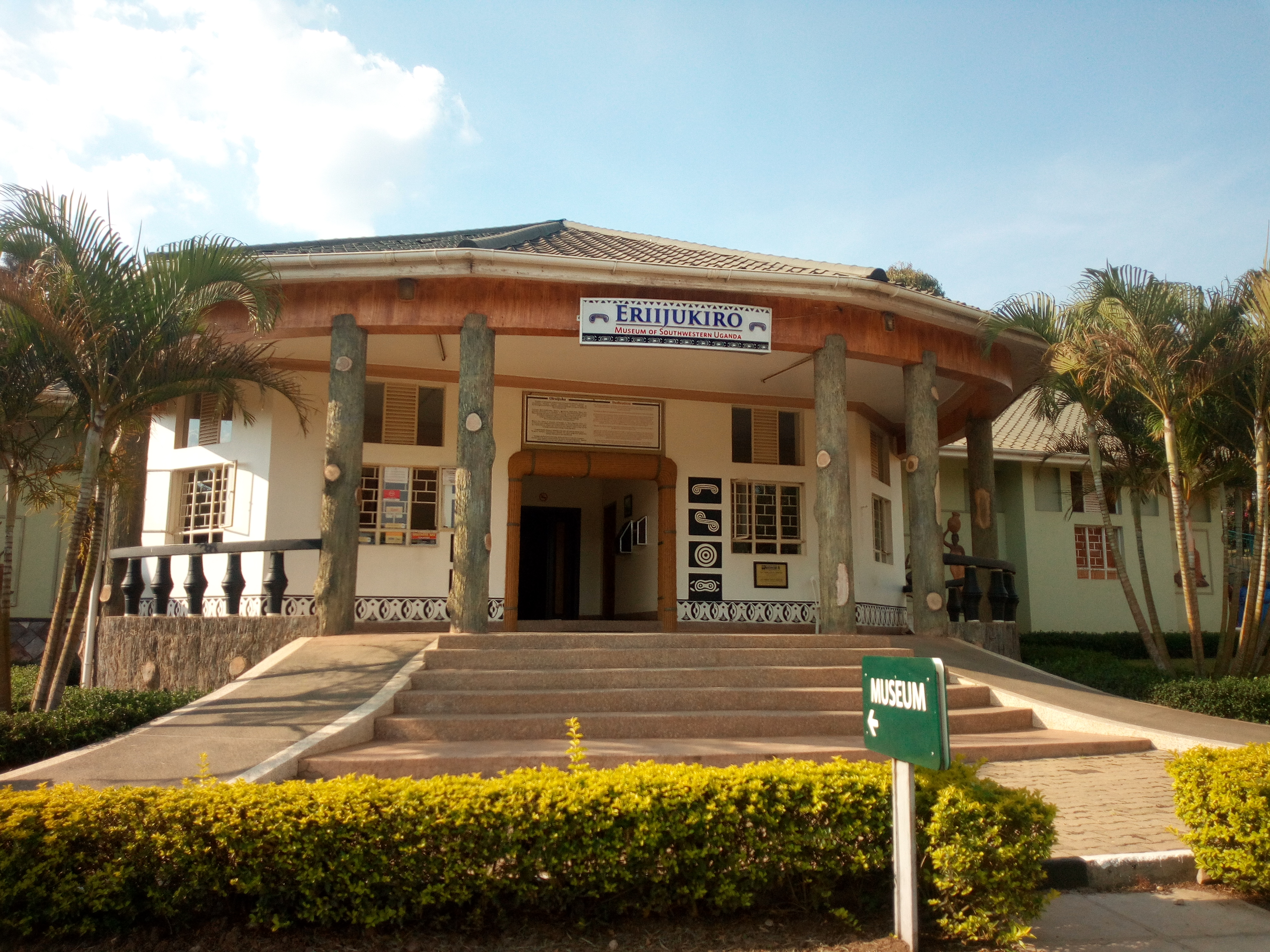
Main Entrance

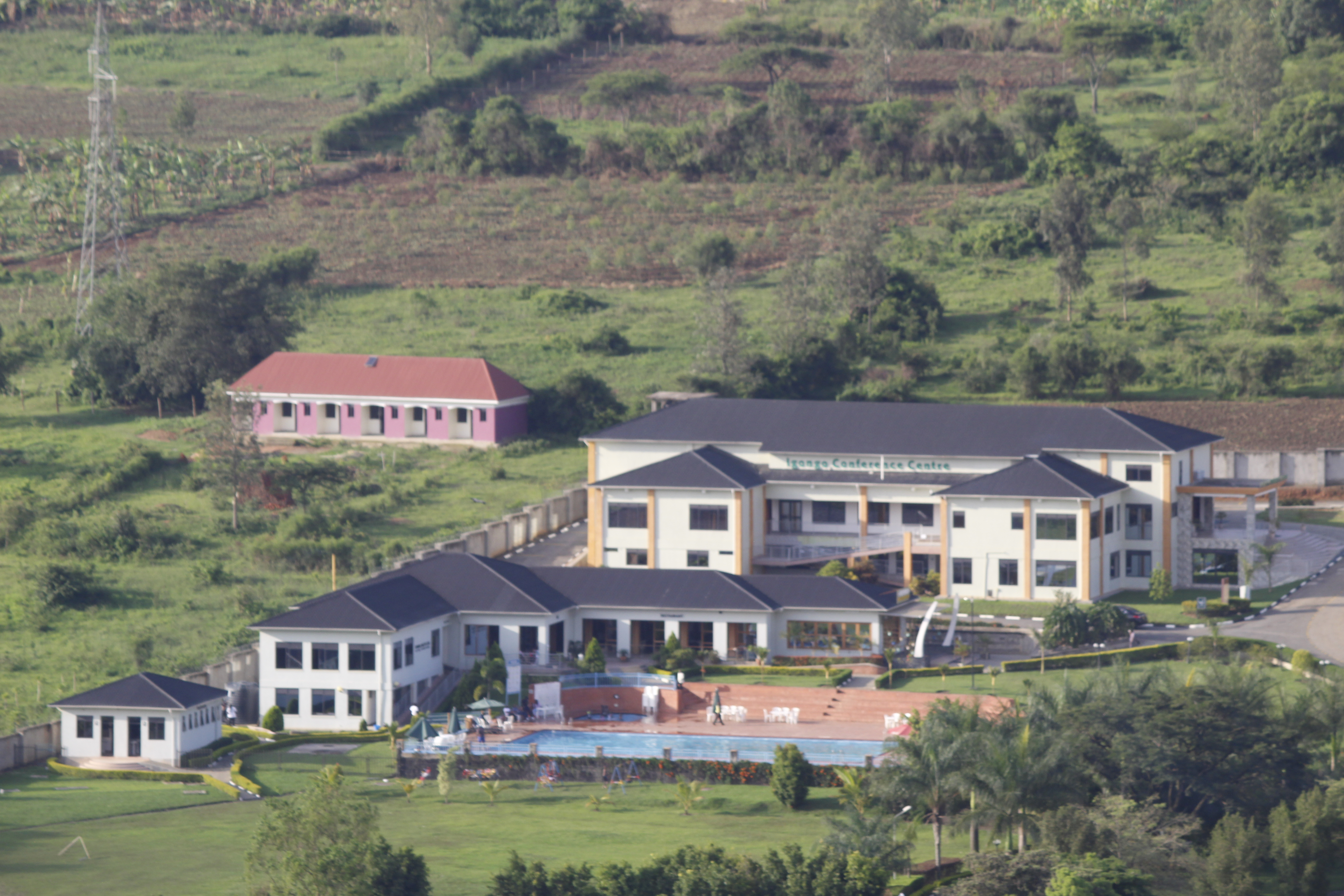
Aerial View

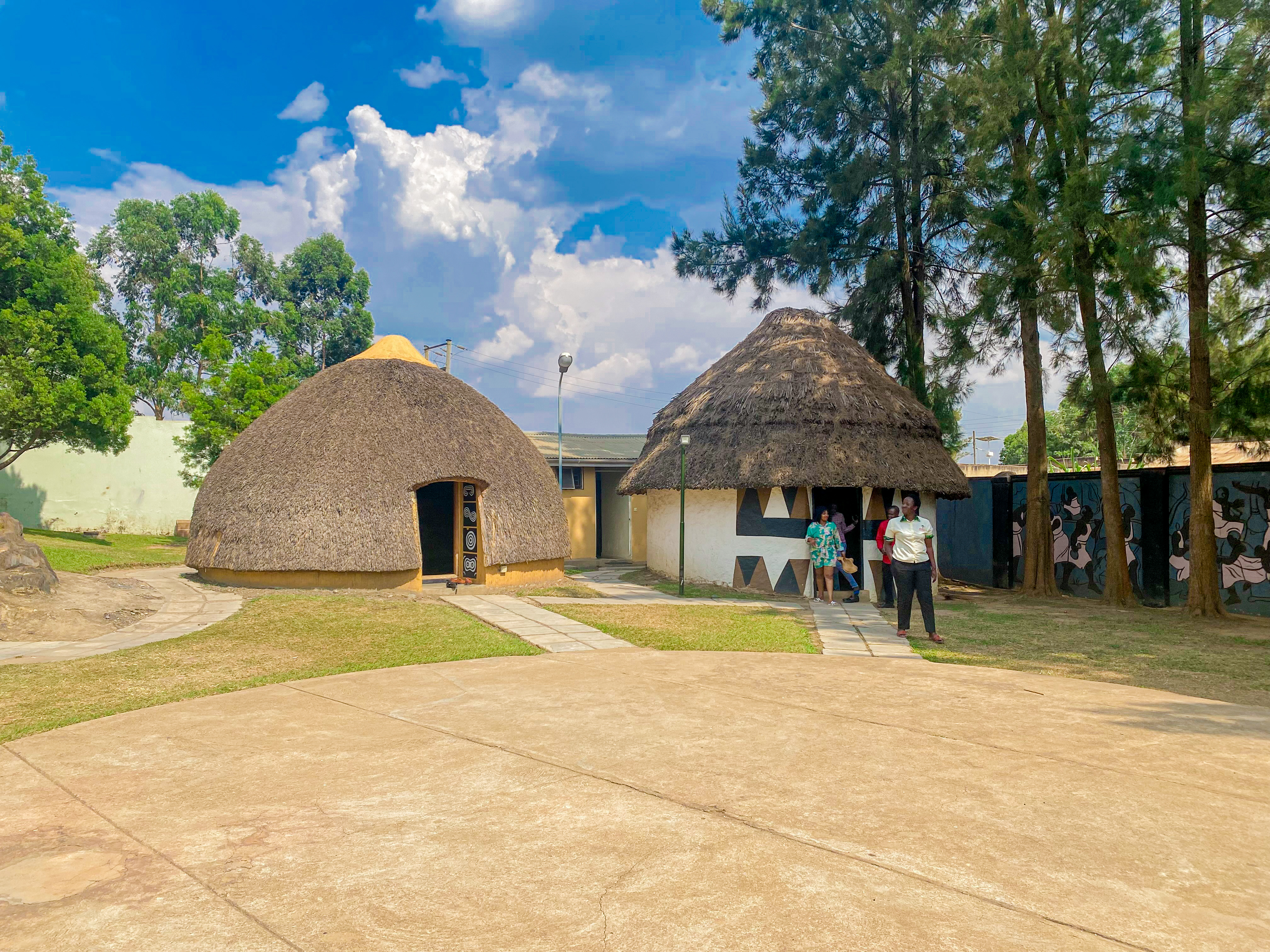

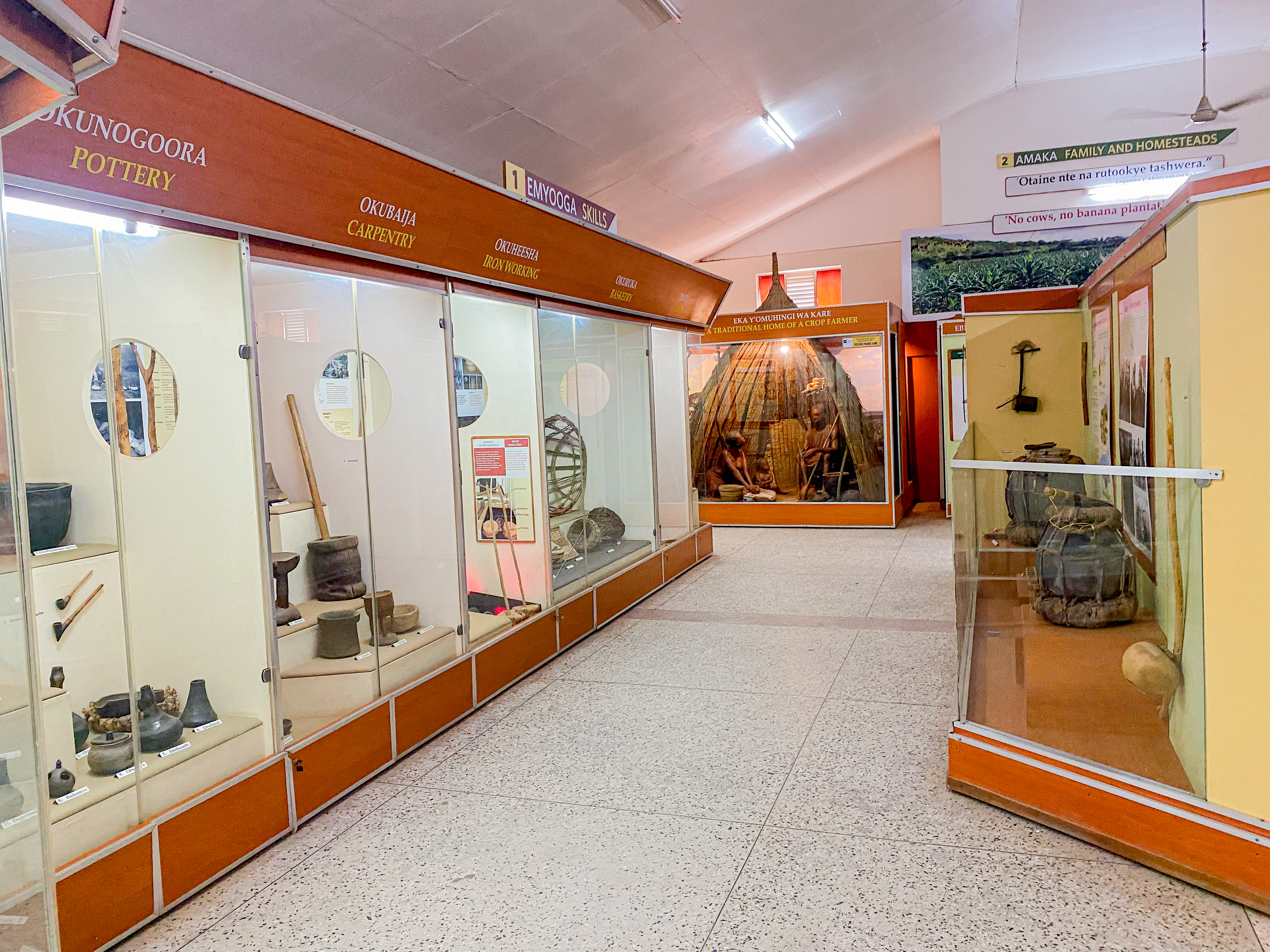
Collections

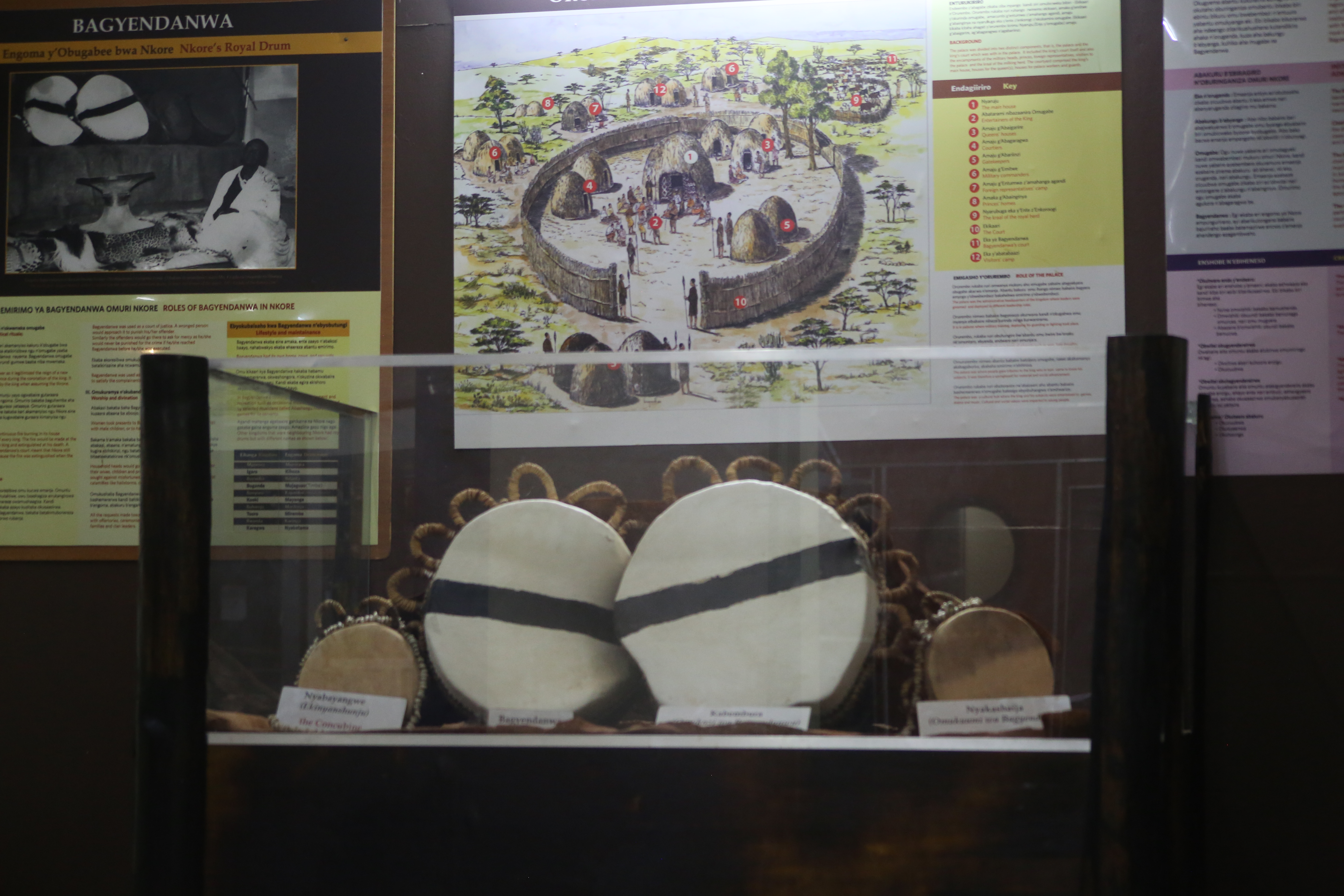
Cultural Dreams Collection

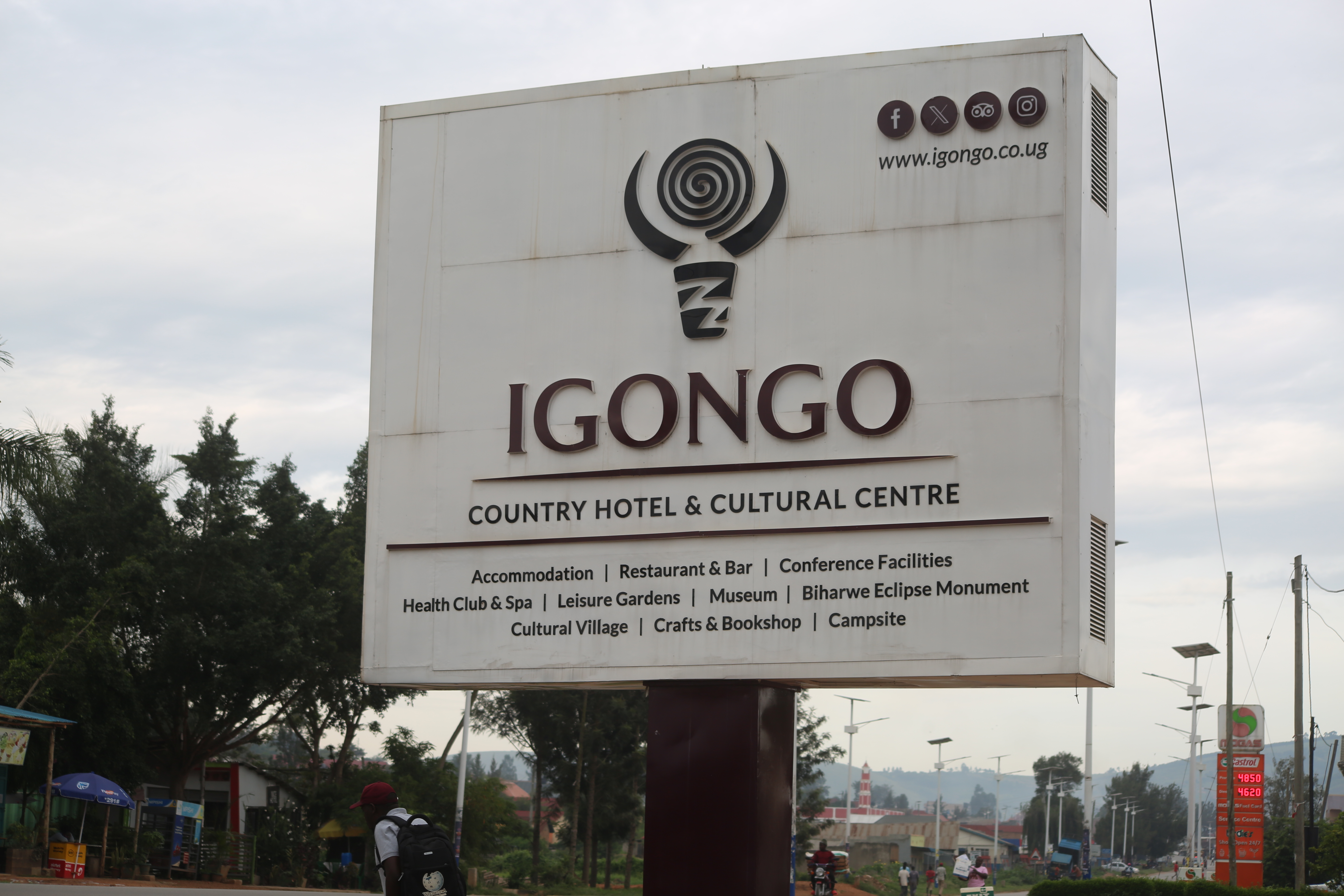
Signpost along Mbrara-Masaka highway

== Recognition ==
- Founded in 2003 by Apollo Karugaba.
- Winner of the 2024 Global Hospitality and Luxury Award.

== See also ==
- Biharwe Eclipse Monument
- Kigulu Cultural Museum
