= List of National Cultural Sites in Eastern Region, Uganda =

This article contains a list of National Cultural Sites in Uganda in the Eastern Region of Uganda as defined by the Uganda Museum.

== List of monuments ==
ID	Site name	Description	District	Location	Original function	Coordinates	Image
UG-E-001	Obalanga Memorial	Mass grave for 365 brutally killed & buried here.commemoration is held 15th-june.	Amuria				More images Upload another image
UG-E-002	Kaperabyong memorial	Mass grave and site.					Upload an image
UG-E-003	?		Budaka				Upload an image
UG-E-004	?		Bududa				Upload an image
UG-E-005	Busoga Hill-Bukoli shrines, Buwunga	Believed to be the origin of Busoga. Visited by women with fertility problems.	Bugiri				Upload an image
UG-E-006	Wakooli shrines/palace	A Nsona- Namakoko, Prince Wakoli Kaunhe, King of Bukooli and his father Musitwa Ibrahim’shrines in Nankoma subcounty.					Upload an image
UG-E-007	Wakoli’s grave	Kaunhe Wakolis grave near Nsono primary school Namakoko.					Upload an image
UG-E-008	Wakoli’s Fort	At Nsona- Namakoko, Bugiri. Site for 1891 – 1893 IBEA					Upload an image
UG-E-009	Kirongo shrines of Bukooli	Near Kirongo hill, at Bubugo village.					Upload an image
UG-E-010	Iyirimbi forest	Traditional cultural forest resource					Upload an image
UG-E-011	Prayer feast tree	In Muterere					Upload an image
UG-E-012	Komuge rock art site	Rock art site.	Bukedea				More images Upload another image
UG-E-013	Bukwa Fossil site	Fossil site on lamitima hill	Bukwa				Upload an image
UG-E-014	Khepcwalini Caves	The cave is at Tulel, Kong’ Asis County, and 3 miles out of Ka pron, Bukwa Road .					Upload an image
UG-E-015	Kabei caves	Bukwa sub county 38 miles from Kapcholwa.					Upload an image
UG-E-016	Sing’ora	Near Bukwa sub county head quarters 3 miles toward Mt Elgon.					Upload an image
UG-E-017	?						Upload an image
UG-E-018	?		Bulambuli				Upload an image
UG-E-019	Bishop Hannington resting place, Budimo village grave	Omutaabi tree	Busia				More images Upload another image
UG-E-020	He and she Cave (Dubelo) at Kachonga		Butaleja				Upload an image
UG-E-021	Hagulu at Mulagi						Upload an image
UG-E-022	?						Upload an image
UG-E-023	Balawooli?		Buyende				Upload an image
UG-E-024	Kigulu hills	Shrines for the Ngobi clan at Namata, near the railway.	Iganga				More images Upload another image
UG-E-025	Bubali Buswikira Shrines	Rocks at the burial place of Kintu with Foot marks of Mutyabule .Has become a shrine.					Upload an image
UG-E-026	Kabuli hill	Natural site at Nawandala Subcounty.					Upload an image
UG-E-027	Bugweri cultural site	At Nondwe is a Place for cultural rituals for Baisemenya. (near Ziraba Muzales Place.)					Upload an image
UG-E-028	Namagera rock shrines	Near Budumba Bridge at Namagera village.					Upload an image
UG-E-029	Nasuti palaces	Ngobi Kigulus palace and burial site for princess Walusansa, Nyiro, Oboja .					Upload an image
UG-E-030	Nhenda hill	At Kigulu, palace and tombs of the Omukama Nantamu.					Upload an image
UG-E-031	Bukoyo Footprints	Footprints reported by Ziraba Muzaale in 1967.					Upload an image
UG-E-032	Namato Rocks	Male and female near Namato primary school					Upload an image
UG-E-033	Jinja Rocks	Origin of name Jinja	Jinja				More images Upload another image
UG-E-034	Busoga Admin post	Naliyanya					Upload an image
UG-E-035	Spire memorial/Mpumudde hill	Historical meeting place for Busoga chiefs. Omukama Kabalega died here while on return from Seychelles exile					More images Upload another image
UG-E-036	Speke monument	Monument signifying Speke sighting of the Source of the Nile					More images Upload another image
UG-E-037	Mahatima Gandhi monument	Also found at the Source of the Nile					More images Upload another image
UG-E-038	Source of the Nile (marker)	Source of life for many great civilizations. The Nile is the longest river in Africa. The source was sighted 1861 by Speke.					More images Upload another image
UG-E-039	Igenge palace	At Namasoga is the palace for Kigulu Chiefs, Izimba.					Upload an image
UG-E-040	Bujjagali ancestral site						More images Upload another image
UG-E-041	Kyabazinga palace, Nakabango	Personal home of the late Kyabazinga of Busoga, Henry Wako Muloki.					Upload an image
UG-E-042	Kyabazingas palace at Wanyange	Official residence of Busogas’ Kyabazingas					Upload an image
UG-E-043	Jinja African Commonwealth war Cemetery	170 burials					More images Upload another image
UG-E-044	Jinja European commonwealth war cemetery	5 burials					Upload an image
UG-E-045	Jinja catholic commonwealth cemetery.	1 burial					More images Upload another image
UG-E-046	Jinja Pier	Landing site at Jinja					More images Upload another image
UG-E-047	Mwiri hill	Archaeological site					More images Upload another image
UG-E-048	Napyangates Burial Ground	Burial Grounds for Lionel Dumore Pennington Leutinant the rptal engineers	Kaberamaido				Upload an image
UG-E-049	Akokoma salt / iron site.	Traditional salt making site					Upload an image
UG-E-050	Buguge rock shelter/ shrines	In Saaka parish. Home to Lamogi chiefs, first settlement of Mukama	Kaliro (Busoga Royal Town)				Upload an image
UG-E-051	Wako Zibondos Mahomo ancestral palace.	At Naigobya village, Gadumile in Bulamogi county, Busoga King, 1893 to 1952.( Palace and tombs of the late Zibondo) Tombs next to Kaliro Primary Teachers College and of Henry Waako Muloki.(					More images Upload another image
UG-E-052	Iyingo	In the 16th- Century –Amunyoro Prince Mukama Namutukula came with wife Nawudo and settled in Iyingo					Upload an image
UG-E-053	St Gonzaga Gonza shrine .	Namugongo subcounty Bulamogi County.					More images Upload another image
UG-E-054	Imarai caves	Madibira Village.					More images Upload another image
UG-E-055	Kafamba Rock Rock	Kisinda					More images Upload another image
UG-E-056	Nawampiti Rock	Nawaikoke					Upload an image
UG-E-057	Historic Muvule Tree	Bumanya					More images Upload another image
UG-E-058	Namasagali landing site	Kamuli, Kabaganda near Nasagali college	Kamuli				More images Upload another image
UG-E-059	Budhumbula Royal Tombs and Mausoleum.	I)Yosiya K Nadiope ii)Sir William Wilberforce Nadiope iii) Dr Anold Nadiope’s burial grounds. Nabiwigulu subcounty Kamuli District."					Upload another image
UG-E-060	Budiope Tombs						Upload an image
UG-E-061	Nnenda hill, Kagulu	Kagulu Sub-county in Budiope.					More images Upload another image
UG-E-062	Itanda Falls						More images Upload another image
UG-E-063	Mise caves	Cultural site near Sipi falls	Kapcworwa				More images Upload another image
UG-E-064	Kapyopyoni site	Farm house and archaeological site at Kirwat.					Upload an image
UG-E-065	Kaproron	Kong ‘asis Headquarters, 14 miles from Kapchorwa it over looks Mt Debesian in Karamoja and Kapenguria & Turkana parts of Kenya.					Upload an image
UG-E-066	Ngwat	At Chema, sipi. One mile out of Mbale-Kapchorwa road					Upload an image
UG-E-067	Munarya Caves	Over looks sipi rest camp					More images Upload another image
UG-E-068	Kapter,	Kapchorwa headquarters salt rock for herdsmen\ Ramkot, Sikeryo, Chepkoikoch					Upload an image
UG-E-069	Tabikwat and Kabungolo	Kaproron subcounty					Upload an image
UG-E-070	?		Katakwi				Upload an image
UG-E-071	?		Kibuku				Upload an image
UG-E-072	Nyero rock paintings	Rock art	Kumi				More images Upload another image
UG-E-073	Mukongoro paintings.	Rock art					Upload an image
UG-E-074	Mukura Memorial	People suffocated in a Container here.					Upload an image
UG-E-075	Kopege, Kakungulu fort	Near Kopege(oleicho)primary school					Upload an image
UG-E-076	Obwini rock paintings	Ayama village, Kumi, orumi primary school.					More images Upload another image
UG-E-077	?		Kween				Upload an image
UG-E-078	?		Luuka				Upload an image
UG-E-079	?		Manafwa				Upload an image
UG-E-080	Kyando memorial	The place where Bishop Hanington was killed while on his way to Buganda	Mayuge				Upload another image
UG-E-081	Fort Thurston Bukaleba	Fort Thurston was built in memory of the three Europeans killed in Lubas fort(nearby) in 1897 by Sudanese soldiers.					Upload an image
UG-E-082	Bukaleba caves	Caves that resided soldiers that kept the Lubas ad/Busogas first administrative posts.					Upload an image
UG-E-083	Lubas Monument	At Imanyiro built in burnt bricks, at a place where lubas fort stood.					Upload an image
UG-E-084	Iyingo Landing site	Fishing village/Market and cultural landscape					Upload an image
UG-E-085	Mawuta Forest	Traditional Cultural forest resource					Upload an image
UG-E-086	Meru Forest	Traditional Cultural forest resource					Upload an image
UG-E-087	Wanumbe Forest	Traditional cultural forest resource					Upload an image
UG-E-088	Bumutoto Circumcision site	In Bunghoko Mbale is the official circumcision site for the start of ceremonies.	Mbale				More images Upload another image
UG-E-089	Budaka fort/residence	Residence of Semei Kakungulu Nabweya near Nabumali high school					Upload an image
UG-E-090	Kakungulus tombs	Tombs for the descendants of Kakungulu, near Nabweya primary school					More images Upload another image
UG-E-091	Miyingo Cultural Site						Upload an image
UG-E-092	Dolwe Island	Rock paintings, gongs and carpules near Golofa hills	Namayingo				More images Upload another image
UG-E-093	Wayasi	On Sigulu island marking the border of Kenya and Uganda.					Upload an image
UG-E-094	Namato Rock	At Kigalama, is a Site for the Mukembe clan, has two wells a male and a female	Namutumba				Upload an image
UG-E-095	Kapir Rock paintings	Rock art Paintings	Ngora				More images Upload another image
UG-E-096	Opege fort	One of Kakungulus several forts built 1900					Upload an image
UG-E-097	Mukula Monument	People were massacred, suffocated in a container.					Upload an image
UG-E-098	Onyeri rock paintings	Rock art					Upload an image
UG-E-099	Kakoro rock paintings	3 rock art paintings sites within the granite rock.	Pallisa				More images Upload another image
UG-E-100	Kakungurus fort						Upload an image
UG-E-101	Nyakiringa teo cultural site						Upload an image
UG-E-102	?		Serere				Upload an image
UG-E-103	Greek river Fossil site	Around greek river are several geological fossil sites.	Sironko				Upload an image
UG-E-104	Obwin rock painting	White paintings	Soroti				Upload an image
UG-E-105	Soroti Museum	Old Mbale road					Upload an image
UG-E-106	Tororo rock and caves	Geological Monument, with rock shelters/ scenic landscape. A tourist attraction .	Tororo				More images Upload another image
UG-E-107	Commonwealth War Graves	2nd World War Common wealth war victims Cemetery.					More images Upload another image
UG-E-108	Muhana Footmark	At Mulanda, is a footprint and cross on the rock.					More images Upload another image
UG-E-109	Tororo mines	Established to exploit cement.					Upload another image

== See also ==
- National Cultural Sites in Uganda for other National Cultural Sites in Uganda
