= Ntare VI of Ankole =

Ugandan monarch (1940–2011)

Ntare VI (January 10, 1940 – October 14, 2011) was the Omugabe of Nkore or Ankole and the 27th of the Bahinda dynasty, although he did not rule over Ankole.

== Early years and education ==
Ntare VI was born as John Patrick Barigye on 10th January 1940 to Omugabe (King) Charles Godfrey Gasyonga II, the last reigning king of Ankole /Nkore kingdom, Uganda and Queen Constance Ndyomwishiki. Barigye graduated in economics from Cambridge University in England in 1962 and has subsequently been ambassador in West Germany and the Vatican. Idi Amin, then president of Uganda, gave Barigye a job as an ambassador after Barigye and Barigye's father publicly asked Amin not to restore the monarchy.

He died in October 2011 at the age of 71 and was succeeded by his son, the current titular King Charles Rwebishengye.

== Coronation and kingship ==
His coronation took place on November 20, 1993 and was subsequently nullified by the NRM government. He was the first king after the kingship had been abolished 1967. The kingship in Ankole is still not restored, contrary to the other kingdoms in Uganda viz Toro, Buganda and Bunyoro. President Museveni himself nullified the coronation in 1993, saying the people of Ankole had to decide.

== Personal life ==
Before his death, John Patrick Barigye was in the middle of a divorce suit with his wife Denise Kwezi and mother of his four children. The case was before the Nakawa Chief Magistrate's court. However, the court had advised the couple to amicably settle the dispute out of court to avoid exposing their affairs in public.

In his divorce suit filed at Nakawa Court, Barigye stated that he made several attempts towards restoring marital harmony, but his wife neither had the willingness nor the desire to resume the marriage.

On October 17, 1988, Barigye survived the crash of Uganda Airlines Flight 775.
