= Biharwe Eclipse Monument =

Coordinates: 0°31′34″S 30°44′23″E

The Biharwe Eclipse Monument aka 1520AD Biharwe Eclipse Monument is a monument that was built in commemoration of the total eclipse of the sun which took place on April 17, 1520. It is located in Biharwe town in Mbarara District, Uganda.

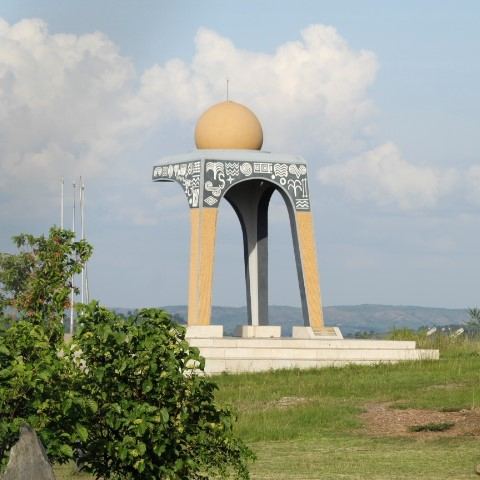
Biharwe Eclipse Monument

== History ==
The monument was unveiled by the Yoweri Kaguta Museveni on 30 August 2014. It is the only scientifically dated event in the early history of the Great Lakes Region. The eclipse is mentioned in the folktales of Bunyoro, Buganda, and Ankole; this helped historians to know the royal ancestors of those kingdoms.

On his way back to his kingdom in Bunyoro, when the eclipse occurred, the King of Bunyoro, Olimi I Rwitamahanga, was forced to abandon all his loot, which included cows, women, and slaves that he had looted from Rwanda during the reign of Umwami Ruganzu II Ndori. The loot that was left behind was inherited by Ntare I Nyabugarobwera, who was the king of Nkore at that time. The cows were named "Empenda ya Munoni" and "Enduga Mwiguru", which are translated as "cows from heaven".

Some legends have it that because he could not go back to his kingdom empty handed, Olimi I Rwitamahanga (the king of Bunyoro) chose to invade Buganda kingdom under the reign of Ssekabaka Nakibinge. During the battle in Bulemezi, Ssekabaka Nakibinge and his commander Kibuuka were killed after Kibuuka's Munyoro concubine betrayed him. Nakibinge was succeeded by his son Mulondo.

The Biharwe monument was constructed with the help of a grant from UNDP that was given to Igongo Cultural Centre and Country hotel under the Business Enterprise Innovation Challenge in December 2019.

Joseph Sematimba, a creative director and lecturer of art and design at Makerere University in Kampala, designed the Biharwe Eclipse Monument.

=== The three pillars ===
The three pillars on the monument represent the three kings (Olimi, Ntare, and Nakibinge) who were affected directly by the Biharwe eclipse. The fourth pillar was not added, as this symbolised the instability amongst the kingdoms that is the cattle raids, famine, and tribal wars of that era.

=== The globe / Sphere ===
The sphere represents the moon that is uniformly offset along a circular void on top to create a ring void that surrounds the base of the globe. The gap was designed to simulate the eclipse with its shadow on the ground as long as there is sunshine. The simulation is a transforming shadow that is cast at the base of the monument that keeps evolving from a crest shape shadow in the morning sunrise to a ring-shape shadow at mid-day and finally to a fading crest shadow at sunset.

=== The pictorials and symbols on the surface ===
The pictorials include drums, shields, spears, and other symbols that represent aspects of different cultures such as community values, lifestyles, beliefs, and tools that were used for different purposes. They are derived from the patterns that were used on the traditional Hima huts.

== See also ==
- Bunyoro
- Julia Kibubura
