= Wamala =

Wamala is a surname. Notable people with the surname include:

- Elly Wamala (1935–2004), Ugandan musician
- Emmanuel Wamala (born 1926), Ugandan Catholic cardinal
- Esther Wamala, Ugandan science and health journalist
- Florence Nambozo Wamala (born 1975), Ugandan politician
- Katumba Wamala (born 1956), Ugandan general

== See also ==
- Lake Wamala, a freshwater lake in Uganda
