= Ebyevugo =

Ugandan poetry form

Ebyevugo is a genre of oral poetry in the Runyankore language, spoken by the Banyankore people of southwestern Uganda. Ebyevugo are mainly composed and performed to praise cattle, brides, warriors, and political leaders. They reflect the traditional pre-colonial occupations, values, and history of the Banyankore, especially the Bahima, who are cattle keepers.

== History ==
Ebyevugo likely originated at communal gatherings in people’s homes or beer parties, where people met to talk and share experiences. Ebyevugo were also used as a form of entertainment, education, and socialization. Ebyevugo are closely related to ibyivugo, the praise poetry of the Banyarwanda people of Rwanda, who share linguistic and cultural ties with the Banyankore. Both ebyevugo and ibyivugo contain characteristics that reflect the distinction between the cattle-keeping elite (Bahima/Batutsi) and the farming majority (Bairu/Bahutu) in the pre-colonial era.

== Performance ==
Ebyevugo are performed by individual poets, called abevugyi, who have the skill, creativity, and ability to memorize and recite the poetry. The performance of ebyevugo is usually accompanied by musical instruments, such as drums, flutes, and horns. The performance is also interactive, as the audience responds to the poet’s calls with chants, claps, or cheers. Ebyevugo performances are influenced by context, the occasion, and the audience. Ebyevugo are still recited in the Ankole countryside, in homes and beer places, but the most common occasion for their performance is the okuhingira, the dowry and/or marriage ceremony.

== Significance ==
Ebyevugo are significant for the preservation and transmission of the Banyankore culture, identity, and history. Ebyevugo celebrate the beauty, strength, and wealth of the Banyankore, especially their prized cattle. Ebyevugo also praise the bravery, heroism, and achievements of Banyankore warriors and political leaders, such as the kings and chiefs. Ebyevugo link to the behaviors and attitudes of the Banyankole people and are essential for their well-being. They were taught to male members of society at a young age, and they grew up knowing how to compose and respect them.

== See also ==
- Ekitaguriro
- Ekizino
- Omugamba
