= Julia Kibubura =

First woman to become a gombola chief in Western Uganda

Omwami (Sir) Julia Kibubura
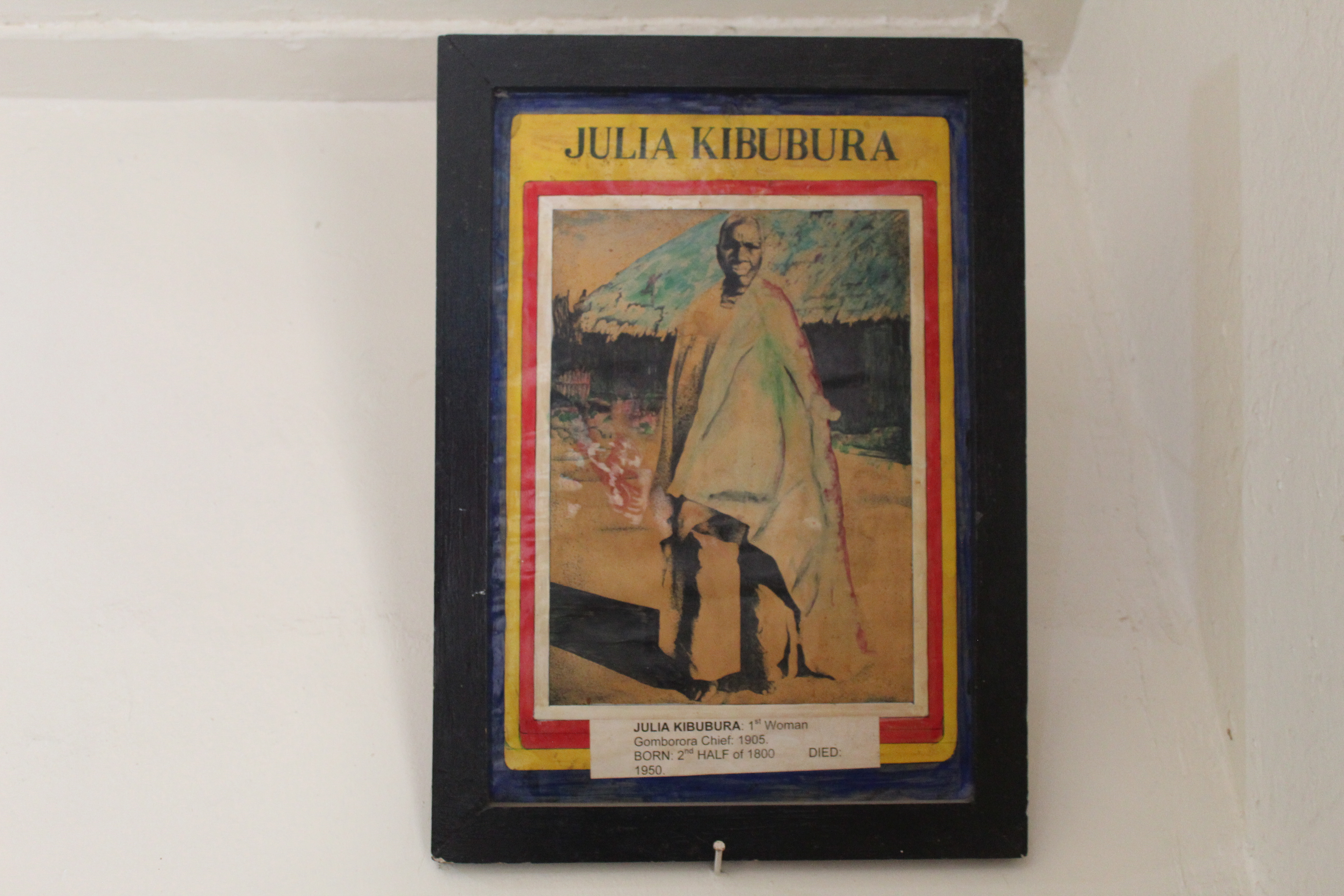
- Julia Kibubura by BalukuBrian taken 2022-09-26
- Born: Julia Kibubura
- Baptised: 1903
- Died: 27-12-1950; Ibanda District
- Burial place: Ibanda District
- Monuments: Kibubura Church, Kibubura Girls' School
- Occupation: Chief,
- Known for: A deviner to the King "omugabe" of Nkore kingdom. First woman Gombolola (county) chief and also for holding the body of the late Harry St George Galt who was speared by a native in Ibanda
- Relatives: Kishokye (Sister), Michael Kibeeherere (Grandson)

Julia Kibubura was the first woman to take up a political leadership position as Gombolola (County) chief in Western Uganda. The locals addressed her as Omwami which is translated as Sir in English. She was appointed as a Gombolola chief by Harry St. George Galt who was a sub commissioner in charge of the western region in 1905. In honor of her memory, Kibubura Girls' Secondary school was named after her because she was an advocate for mass education, especially for girls. She was a former diviner of the King of Ankole.

== Early life ==
The root word for the name Kibubura in Runyakitara is ‘okububura’ loosely translated as ‘the roaring of a lion’.

Kibubura was born in Ibanda to the witch doctor of then Omugabe Mutabuka. She was forced into exile when her father, an influential fortune teller and medicine man sided with Mukwenda who was locked up in a power struggle with Ntare-V. Mukwenda lost this fight and thus had to flee.

Kibubura, her sister Kishokye and her brothers fled to Bunyoro, which was, then under Omukama Kabalega. They later returned to Ankole thanks to their spiritual intercession (Okubandwa). As intermediaries between the worlds of spirits and humans, they were welcomed like heroes and given freedom in Ankole. In exchange, they used their emandwa, Nyakashambi to protect Ankole from any danger. When the Christian missionaries came Kibubura ditched emandwa and was baptized.

Julia Kibubura was baptized in 1903 after she and other 25 readers travelled by foot to Mbarara for baptism. She went back in Ibanda and she was instrumental in the construction of the first church made of mud and wattle. The church was later in 1970s replaced with the current St. Paul church of Uganda Ibanda on which Late Archbishop Luwum laid a foundation stone in 1976

Kibubura's known grandson is Michael Kibeeherere

== Controversies ==
There is still a rumour in Ibanda that Kibubura had a secret love affair with Harry St George Galt and that it is the reason why he appointed her as a Gombolola chief in Western Uganda. Kibubura's astounded natives of Ibanda because at that time, women leaders were usually frowned upon.| However, Michael Kibeeherere, a grandson of Julia Kibubura, disputed the claim of the secret love affair by saying that "Kiburura was an honourable person, virtuous and dignified, totally incapable of an extramarital affair," in 2016.

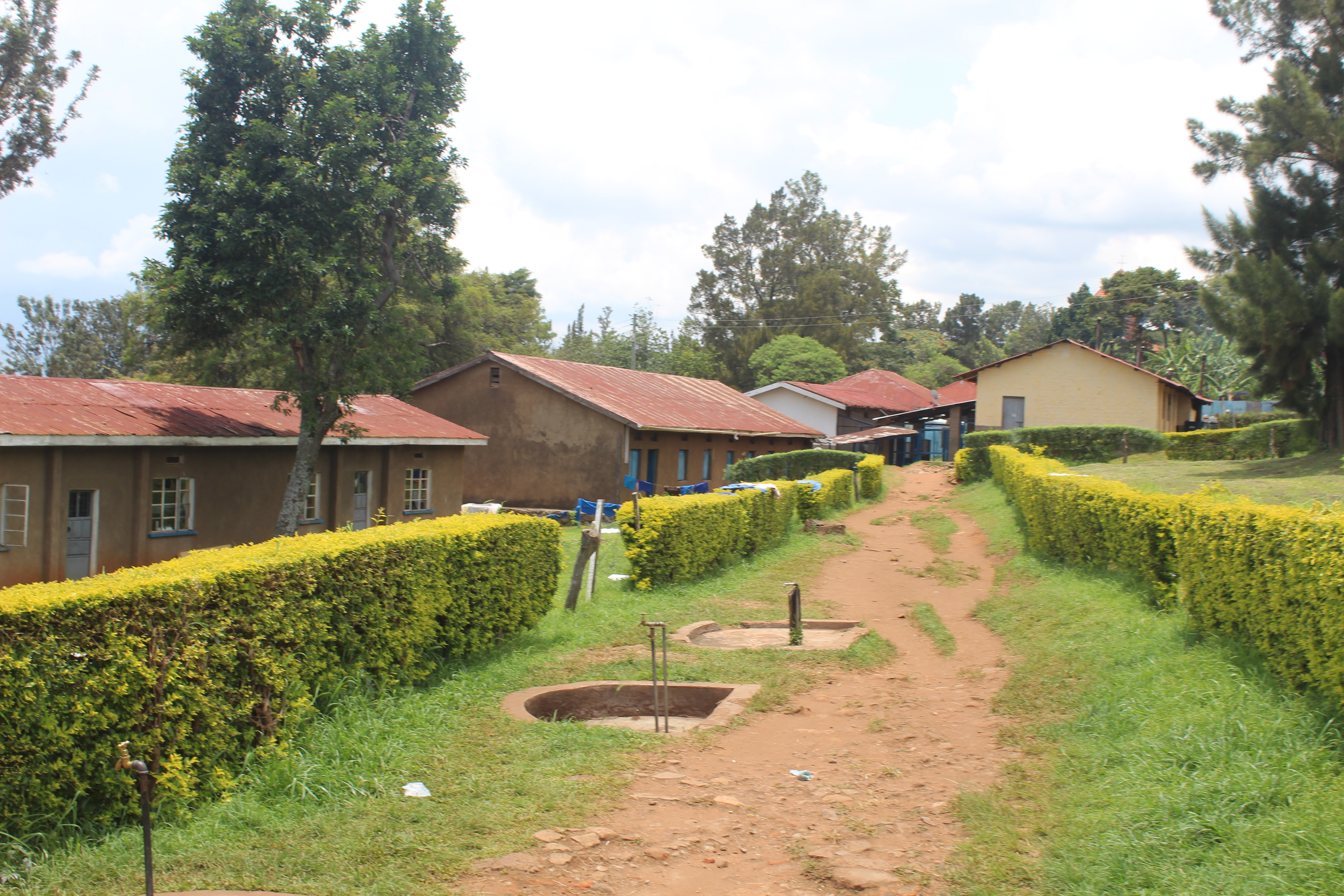
Kibubura Girls' Secondary School

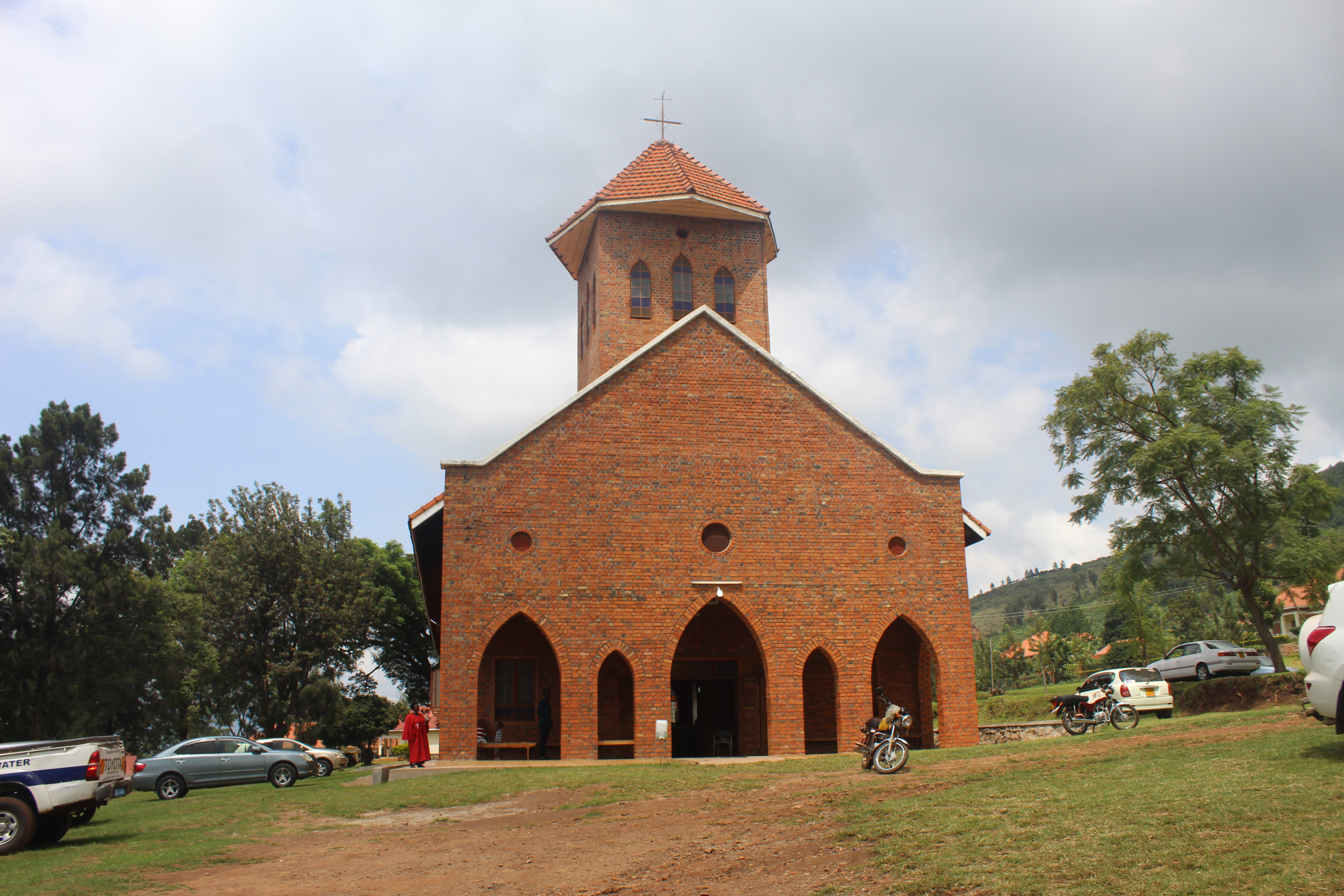
Kibubura Church

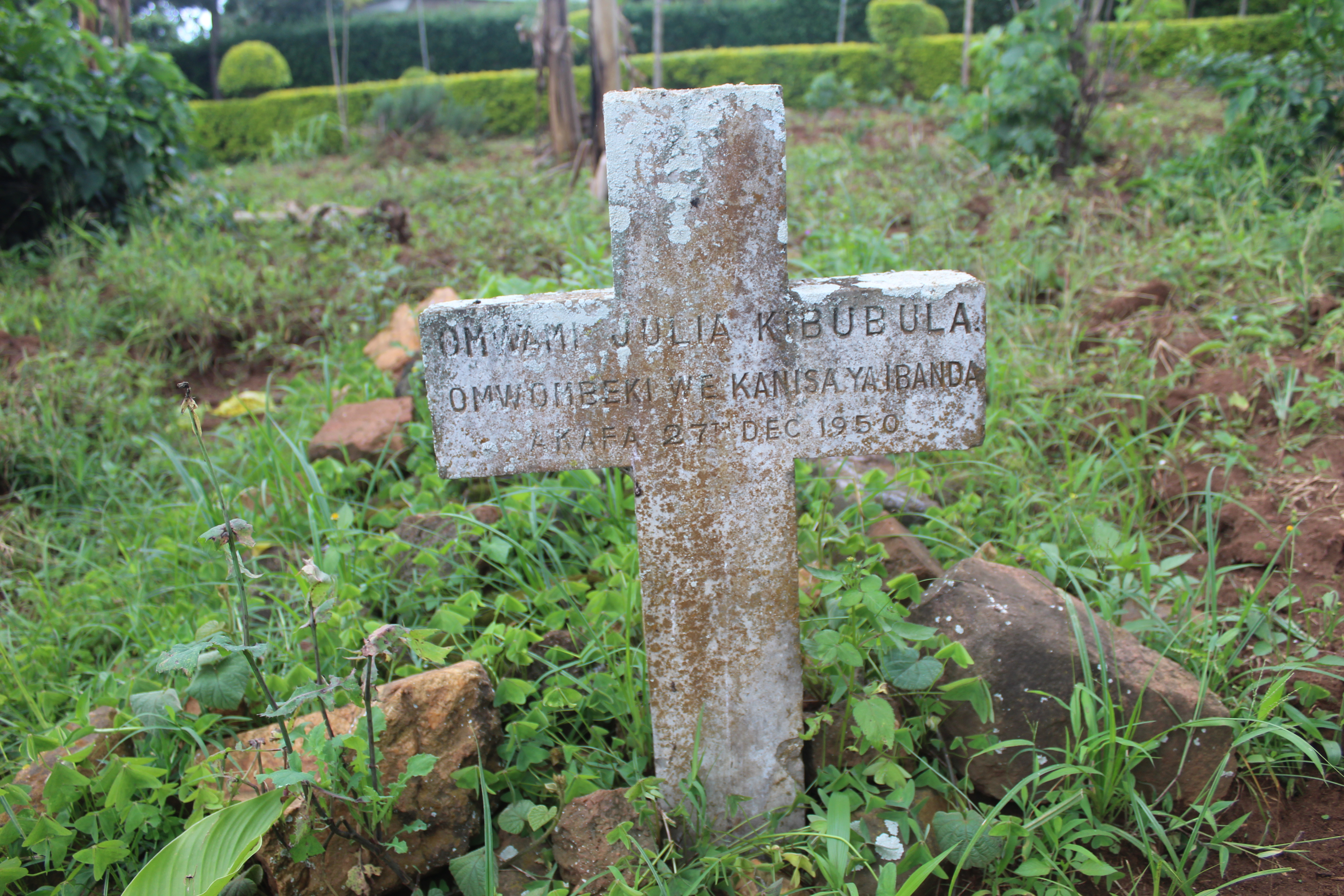
Kibubura Graves

== See also ==
1. Janet Museveni
2. Janani Luwum
3. Galt Memorial
4. Kibubura Girls' Secondary School
