= Ruti, Mbarara =

Ward in Nyamitanga Division, Mbarara City, Uganda

Ruti
- Nickname: Omuruti
- Interactive map of Ruti
- Coordinates: 0.62895°S 30.63263°E
- Country: Uganda
- Region: Western Uganda
- District: Mbarara District
- Constituency: Mbarara Municipality
- Division: Nyamitanga Division
- Elevation: 1,200 m (3,900 ft)

Population (2009)
  - Urban: 5,600
- Time zone: UTC+3 (EAT)

Ruti is a ward of Nyamitanga Division in Mbarara City (Western Region of Uganda). Its one of the busiest suburbs in Mbarara.

Next to Ruti is the famous secondary school called Nyakayojo Secondary School. Ruti is known for acting as the place where long distance trucks heading to Rwanda and Burundi park. The area records high HIV status levels in Uganda.

Ruti forms part of the urban area elevated from municipal status to city status on 1 July 2020.

== Location ==
The settlement is approximately on 4 miles (6.4 km) off Kabale road southwest of Mbarara Central Business District. The area borders with Nyakayojo Division in the west, Nyakakoni in the North, Ruharo in the North east, and Katete ward in the East.

== Administration and representation ==
Mbarara City is organised into two city divisions (Mbarara City North and Mbarara City South), which are subdivided into wards (parishes) and zones (villages). Ruti is listed among the wards of Nyamitanga Division, with an elected ward councillor for the 2021–2026 term.

== Demographics ==
In the 2024 National Population and Housing Census releases, Uganda Bureau of Statistics reported a resident population of 261,656 for Mbarara City (city-wide figure).

== Services ==
=== Health ===
Mbarara City Council lists Ruti Health Centre II as a public health facility in Nyamitanga Division.

== Planning and built environment ==
Ruti appears in planning documentation for the Mbarara urban area (for example, the Mbarara Municipality Structure Plan 2008–2018 map materials). In Mbarara City Council’s informal settlement profiling, “Tankhill” is described as covering areas associated with nearby wards including Ruti (alongside other adjoining localities referenced in the profile).

== See also ==
- Mbarara District
- Nyakayojo Secondary School
- Biharwe
- Nyamitanga Division
