= Margaret Rwebyambu =

Ugandan politician and legislator

Margaret Ayebare Rwebyambu
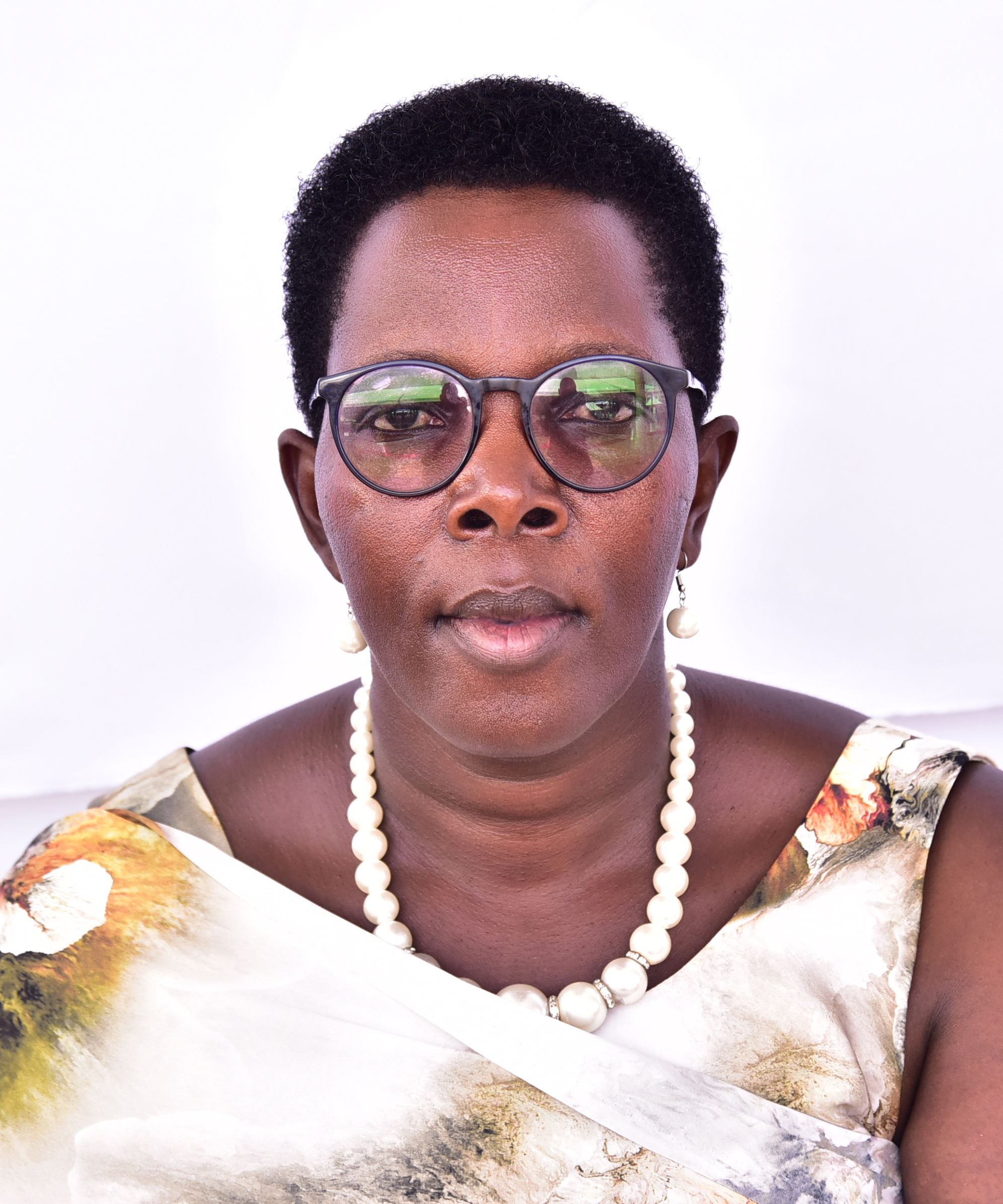

Woman Member of Parliament for Mbarara District
- Incumbent
- Assumed office Eleventh Parliament of Uganda (2021–2026)

Personal details
- Party: National Resistance Movement (assumed, if known)
- Occupation: Politician, Legislator
- Known for: Philanthropy and advocacy for education; donations to hospitals in Mbarara
- Committees: Health Committee, Parliament of Uganda

Margaret Ayebare Rwebyambu (born 29 March 1970) is a Ugandan politician, social worker and legislator. She is the woman MP in the eleventh parliament representing Mbarara district in the eleventh parliament of Uganda. She also a member on the Health Committee of parliament.

== Education background ==
Ayebare started her education at Bwengure Primary School where she sat her Primary Leaving Examinations (PLE) in 1984. She attended Kibubura Girls Senior Secondary School (SSS) for her Ordinary Level of education and Kyeizooba Girls Senior Secondary School for her Advanced Level of education in 1991. She spent 16 years without receiving formal education and later on joined Kyambogo University after sitting for the for mature age entry examinations. (These are an alternative to pursue higher education for adults who do not have the traditional entry qualifications for joining the university). She graduated in 2011 with a Bachelors degree of Social Works and Social Administration at Kyambogo University.

She holds a Postgraduate Diploma in Sexual Reproductive Health and Rights from Lund University, Sweden in 2019.

== Career ==
She is currently the Woman Member of parliament for Mbarara district, the Director, Capacity Building at Science Research Consortia, the Programmes Manager, National STI Control Unit at Mulago National Referral Hospital (2012-2018). Furthermore, she was the Regional Field Supervisor for Uganda Bureau of Statistics (2001-2011), Office and Field Editor for Uganda Bureau of Statistics(1994-2000).

== Social and political life ==
During the burial of the late Kaishanyu Miriel Mubezi Nalongo in Kisoroza East Sheema municipality, Ayebare Margaret urged parents to support their children to access education. She implores leaders to speak against the outdated cultural norms and guide communities towards protecting children so that early marriages are stopped.

Rwebyambu donated 40 mattresses to five hospitals in Mbarara City. These hospitals include Bwizibwera Health centre IV, Rubaya Health Centre II, Kagongi Health Centre, Kashare Health Centre and Rubindi Health Centre III. She is interested in Media engagements, travelling and working with communities.

In the NRM primary elections of 2025, she lost the NRM flag to Loydah Kyarikunda Twinomujuni and then proceeded to stand as an Independent Candidate for the 2026 general elections. She was among the independent candidates who refused to step down for the party's official flag bearers in the meeting chaired by the NRM National Vice Chairman Al-Hajji Moses Kigongo.

She lost her MP seat to Loydah Kyarikunda who polled 31,364 votes and Margaret garnering 16,021 votes in the 2026 elections.

== See also ==
- List of members of the eleventh Parliament of Uganda
- Clare Mugumya
