= Makenke =

- Location of Makenke, Mbarara, Uganda
- Coordinates: 00°34′42″S 30°41′08″E
- Country: Uganda
- Region: Western Uganda
- District: Mbarara City
- Constituency: Mbarara City North Division
- Division: Kakiika Division
- Elevation: 1,200 m (3,900 ft)
- Time zone: UTC+3 (EAT)

Makenke is a neighborhood within Mbarara City, in the Western Region of Uganda.

== Location ==
Makenke is located in Kakiika Parish, in Kakiika sub-county, approximately 6 kilometres (4 mi), by road, north-east of Mbarara city's central business district, along the Mbarara–Masaka Highway.

It borders with Kakyenkye to the north, Koranorya to the east, Kakoba to the south west and Nyamityobora to the west. The geographical coordinates of Makenke are 0°34'42.0"S, 30°41'08.0"E (Latitude:-0.578333; Longitude:30.685556).

== Overview ==
Makenke is a low income settlement in the city of Mbarara. The settlement is found in the Kakiika Division of Mbarara City Council. Prior to that, Makenke was part of Kashari County until July 2014 when it was incorporated into Mbarara Municipality.

The 2nd Division of the Uganda People's Defence Force (UPDF) maintains its headquarters at Makenke. In the Makenke barracks, Wazalendo Savings and Credit Cooperative Society maintains a branch. It is also the location of Mbarara Army boarding secondary School and Mbarara Army primary school, that cater to the children of the soldiers and other neighbouring civilian settlers.

Makenke is the location of Mbarara Industrial Park, administered by the Uganda Investment Authority. Mbarara Coca-Cola Bottling Plant, owned by Century Bottling Company Limited, a subsidiary of Coca-Cola International, is located in Makenke.

The Mbarara Northern Bypass Road, starts at Makenke, then progresses northwestwards through Rwebishuri, Nkokonjeru, Ruharo, across the River Rwizi, before it ends at Nyakayojo, along the Mbarara–Ntungamo–Kabale–Katuna Road, a total distance of about 14.5 kilometres (9 mi).

== See also ==
- Ankole Sub-Region
