= Katete (Uganda) =

Ward/neighbourhood in Mbarara City, Uganda

- Ward / neighbourhood
- Location in Uganda
- Coordinates: 0.616667°S 30.683333°E
- Country: Uganda
- Region: Western Region
- District: Mbarara District
- Division: Nyamitanga Division
- Time zone: UTC+3 (EAT (UTC+3))

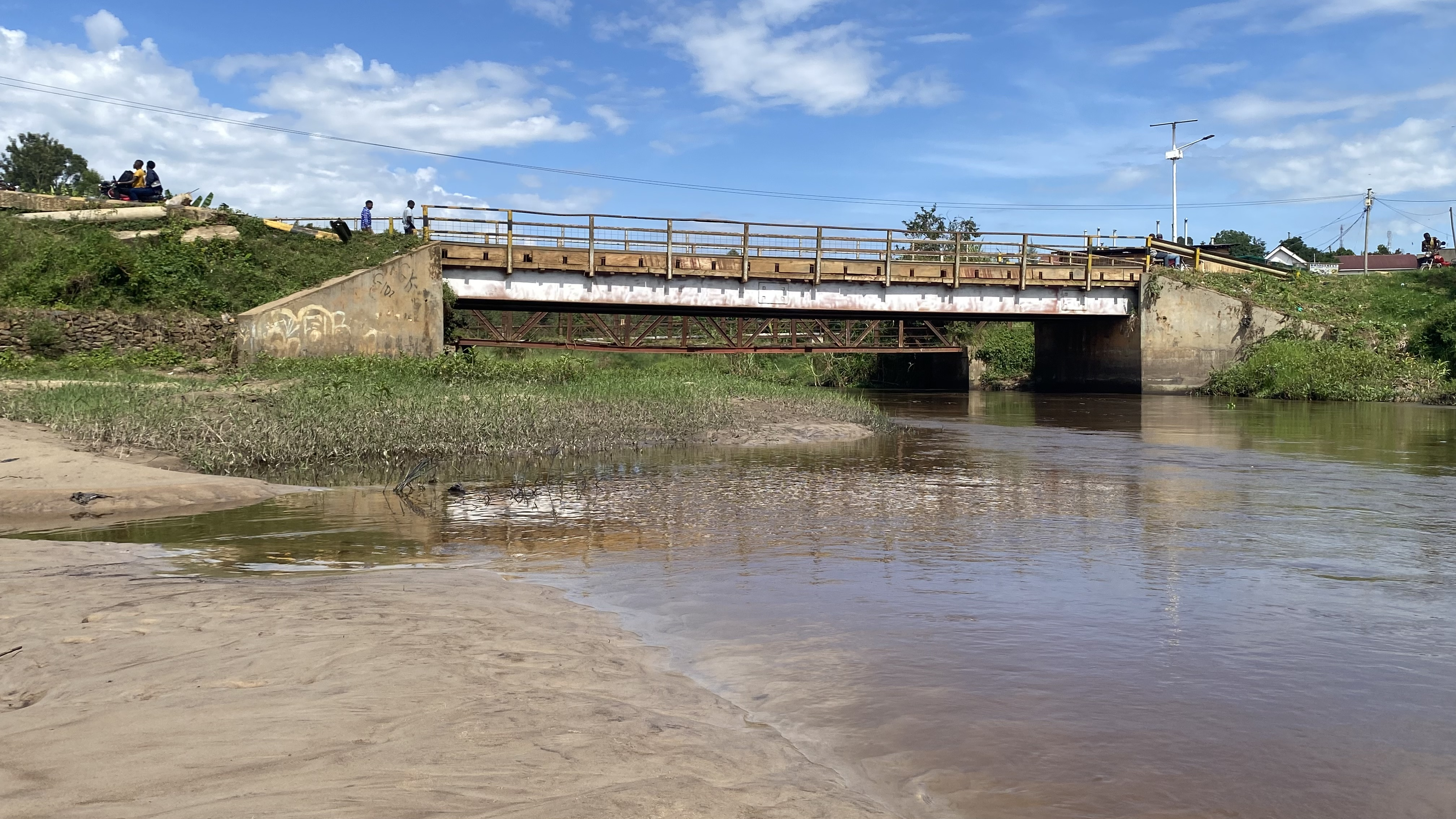
Katete Bridge found in mbarara

Katete is an urban ward and neighbourhood in Mbarara City in the Western Region of Uganda. It lies in Nyamitanga Division on the River Rwizi corridor and is linked to nearby parts of the city by Katete Bridge.

== Location ==
Katete is part of the built-up area of Mbarara City and sits near River Rwizi. Katete Bridge crosses the river and provides a key link between communities in Mbarara City South Division, including residents of Nyamitanga and Katete ward, and road users connecting to Mbarara from Isingiro District.

== Administration ==
Mbarara Municipality has historically been organised around division councils, including Nyamitanga, Kakoba and Kamukuzi.

Katete is referenced in local reporting as a ward in Mbarara City South Division.

== Transport and infrastructure ==
=== Katete Bridge ===
Katete Bridge is a crossing over River Rwizi. News reports describe it as a shortcut for traders and travellers moving between Mbarara and Isingiro, and as an important local route for residents in Nyamitanga and Katete ward.

Local reporting states the bridge was constructed in 1999 and has required repeated repairs, with closures and restrictions applied after damage.

In December 2024, the Uganda People’s Defence Forces (UPDF) Engineering Brigade began rehabilitation works on the bridge, reported in the media at about UGX 360 million.

== Environment ==
Katete lies near River Rwizi, a key water source for Mbarara and surrounding areas. Reporting has linked pressure on the river to pollution, encroachment and reduced flows, with residents in Katete cited among communities affected by the river’s decline.

== Climate ==
Katete lies in the Mbarara area, which the district authorities describe as having two rainy seasons (roughly February to May and September to December), with average annual rainfall around 1,200 mm and temperatures commonly reported between 17 °C and 30 °C.

== See also ==
- Mbarara City
- Nyamitanga Division
- River Rwizi
