= Mbarara Northern Bypass Road =

Road in Uganda

Coordinates: 00°34′53″S 30°39′30″E

Route information
- Length: 14.5 km (9.0 mi)
- History: Designated in 2015; Completed in 2018

Major junctions
- North end: Makenke
- South end: Nyakayojo

Location
- Country: Uganda

Highway system
- Roads in Uganda

The Mbarara Northern Bypass Road is a road that bypasses the northern part of Mbarara City.

== Location ==
The road is located in Mbarara City, in the Western Region of Uganda. It starts from Makenke in Kakiika Division, across from the Coca-Cola plant, then it continues northwards to Rwebishuri before reaching Nkokonjeru. The road will then pass through a valley next to Ruharo hill. After crossing River Rwizi, the bypass ends at Katatumba Resort along Kabale road. The road covers about 14.5 kilometres (9 mi) in length.

== Overview ==
The road was developed and constructed to decongest the central business district of Mbarara City, by providing an alternative route for large cargo trucks destined for Tanzania, Rwanda, Burundi, or the Democratic Republic of the Congo. The construction of this road was launched by President Yoweri Museveni on 1 March 2015. Original commissioning of the completed road was planned for April 2017, but additional work of 0.9 kilometres (1 mi), required a contract extension.

== Construction costs ==
The road was expected to cost about €170 million (US$210 million), of which the European Union was expected to lend about €122 million (US$144 million), with the Uganda government funding the remaining amount €45 million (US$55 million). In March 2015, the China Railway Seventh Group began construction. During the budget speech for the financial year 2018/2019, read on 14 June 2018, Matia Kasaija, the Uganda Minister of Finance, Planning and Economic Development announced that the road had been completed.

== See also ==
- Uganda National Roads Authority
- List of roads in Uganda
