= Nyakayojo Secondary School =

- Mbarara, Mbarara District; Uganda

Information
- Type: Public Middle school and high school (8-13)
- Motto: Toil and Achieve
- Established: 1984
- Head Teacher: Tumwebaze Godfrey
- Enrollment: 800+ (2015)
- Athletics: football, track, netball, volleyball
- Nickname: Nyax

Nyakayojo is a mixed school in the city of Mbarara, Mbarara District. It is a public school, founded and owned by the Church of Uganda with support from the government of Uganda.

== Location ==
The school is on Bwenkoma hill, in Nyakayojo Division near Ruti, Mbarara Trading Centre, south-west of the central business district, approximately 6 miles (9.7 km) off Mbarara Kabale road.

== History ==
With the government policy to increase secondary schools during the second reign of president Apollo Milton Obote, in 1984, Nyakayojo church under the Church of Uganda, decided to establish a secondary school. The plans were led by Canon Yafesi Bikaaku. They established an ordinary senior school. The school remained small with very few members until the coming of Late Kakuru Ephraim (Cadre) as he was popularly known to students, in 1989 he added many strategies, recruited more teachers and constructed more class rooms and students dormitories.

In 2001, advanced level was introduced specializing mainly in arts and mathematics. By 2005, when Kakuru Ephraim retired from the teaching service, the school had up to 500 students.

Tweheyo James, who is the chairman of Uganda National Teachers Union (UNATU) (2015), held the office as a head teacher of Nyakayojo Secondary School in 2005. Under him, the school developed strategically in the structures, students number, staff, sports, and academic performance.

It was in 2006 when the school took the Mbarara District Copa Coca-Cola schools football trophy for the first time and it won the trophy again in 2009 representing Mbarara District at the National level.

By 2009, the school was its peak with over 1400 students being one of the most populous schools in Western Uganda.

However the recent years have not been good for the school marked with various strikes, this reduced the reputation of the school, the number of students fall drastically to 490 students in 2014. However the school seems to be stabilizing in the year 2015 with an increase student to up to 800 students.

== Notable alumnus ==
- Ivan Koreta, a military officer in the Uganda People's Defence Forces.

== See also ==
- Education in Uganda
- Mbarara
