= Rubindi =

Coordinates: 0°22′S 30°37′E

- Interactive map of Rubindi
- Country: Uganda
- Region: Western Uganda
- District: Mbarara District
- County: Kashari
- Elevation: 1,400 m (4,600 ft)
- Time zone: UTC+3 (EAT)

Rubindi is a town in Mbarara District, Greater Mbarara region, Ankole sub-region, Western Uganda.

== Location ==
It is located in Mbarara District on the Mbarara-Ibanda road, approximately 40 kilometres (25 mi) north of Mbarara, the largest city in the region and 13 kilometres (8.1 mi) north of Bwizibwera, the nearest town.

== Overview ==
Rubindi is a busy growing town in Kashari, it has the largest of fresh produce in the county with most of the produce coming from Buhweju District. It has the headquarters of Rubindi Subcounty and it is also a hometown of Urban Tibamanya former Member of Parliament Kashari county and Minister of Urban Development. The current member of Parliament for Kashari Yaguma Wilberforce also hails from Rubindi. North of Rubindi is Ruhumba and together they were consolidated to form the Rubindi-Ruhumba town board. The town is soon waiting for a town council status.

== Population ==
As of 2014 the population of Rubindi is not yet known.

== Points of Interest ==
- Rubindi Health Centre III
- Rubindi Catholic parish
- Rubindi weekly market
- Lady's care salon & cosmetics * Ntungamo full gospal church
