= Nyamitanga Division =

Division in Mbarara City, Western Uganda

Nyamitanga Division is one of the six divisions that make up Mbarara City. The six divisions that make up Mbarara are: Nyamitanga Division, Kamukuzi Division, Kakoba Division, Biharwe Division, Kakiika Division and Nyakayojo Division.

== Location ==
Nyamitanga Division is located west and south of the central business district. It is situated along River Rwizi which separates the division from the Eastern divisions of the city.

It borders with Kamukuzi Division and Kakoba Division in the north, Masha and Birere subcounties of Isingiro District in the south, and Nyakayojo Division in the west.

Nyamitanga Division has size of approximately 2,229 hectares

The division consists of the neighborhoods of Katete, Karugangama, Kitobero, Nyamitanga hill, Nsiikye, and Ruti. The place is densely populated.

The Mbarara Catholic archdiocese and the Catholic radio, Radio Maria are located in Nyamitanga Division.

== Points of Interest ==
The division has one of the best Schools and Institutions, in Mbarara which include,

- Uganda Martyrs University Western Campus
- Nyamitanga Institute
- Maryhill High School
- St Joseph Vocational School
- Nyamitanga Secondary School
- Katete Primary School
- St Agnes Center For Education Primary School
- Welden School

== Population ==
In the 2002 census, Nyamitanga Division had a population of 11,622 people. In 2011, estimates showed that the division had 17,272 people. The 2014 census found Nyamitanga had a population of 23,314 people.
