= Biharwe FC =

Association football club in Uganda

- Full name: Biharwe Football Club
- Ground: Biharwe, Mbarara, Uganda

Biharwe Football Club was a Ugandan football club located in Biharwe, Mbarara in Western Uganda. The club played in the top-tier Ugandan Super League in the 2007–08 season but was relegated there is currently no FUFA records that the club is still operating.

The team finished 18th place (at the bottom of the table) with only 24 points from 34 matches. They were one of five teams relegated that season.

== History ==
- Promotion to Super League: In the 2006–07 season, Biharwe FC won the Western Region Mini League finals to gain promotion to the Uganda Super League.
- Super League Season: The club struggled in the 2007–08 season, ultimately finishing in 18th position at the bottom of the division and facing relegation.
- Management Issues: Reports from the time mention coaching changes and management disputes, with the coach blaming a lack of funds and player motivation for the poor performance.

In the 2006 season, Biharwe FC reached the semi-finals of the Western Region Mini League before going down to Masindi Town Council FC. In the 2006–07 season Biharwe FC were more successful and progressed to the finals of the Western Region Mini League (in Bushenyi) by defeating Kilembe Mines FC 4–0 in the semi-finals. In the zone final they beat Tooro United FC 2–1 to gain promotion to the Uganda Super League.

Like most teams making their debut into the Super League, Biharwe FC found the gulf in standards too great and failed to survive the relegation battle, finally finishing in 18th position at the bottom of the division.

=== Record in the top tier ===
Season	Tier	League	Pos.	Pl.	W	D	L	GS	GA	Pts	Movements
2007–08	1	Ugandan Super League	18th	34	5	9	20	26	57	24	Relegated

== See also ==
- Kilembe Mines FC
- Uganda Super League.
- Mbarara City FC.
- Football in Uganda
- Uganda Premier League
- FUFA
