= Urban Tibamanya =

Ugandan lawyer and politician

- Born: 9 September 1949 (age 76); Uganda
- Citizenship: Uganda
- Education: Makerere University (Bachelor of Laws) (Master of Laws); Law Development Centre (Diploma in Legal Practice)
- Occupations: Lawyer & Politician
- Years active: 1976–present
- Known for: Politics
- Title: Former State Minister for Urban Planning
- Spouse: Mrs. Tibamanya

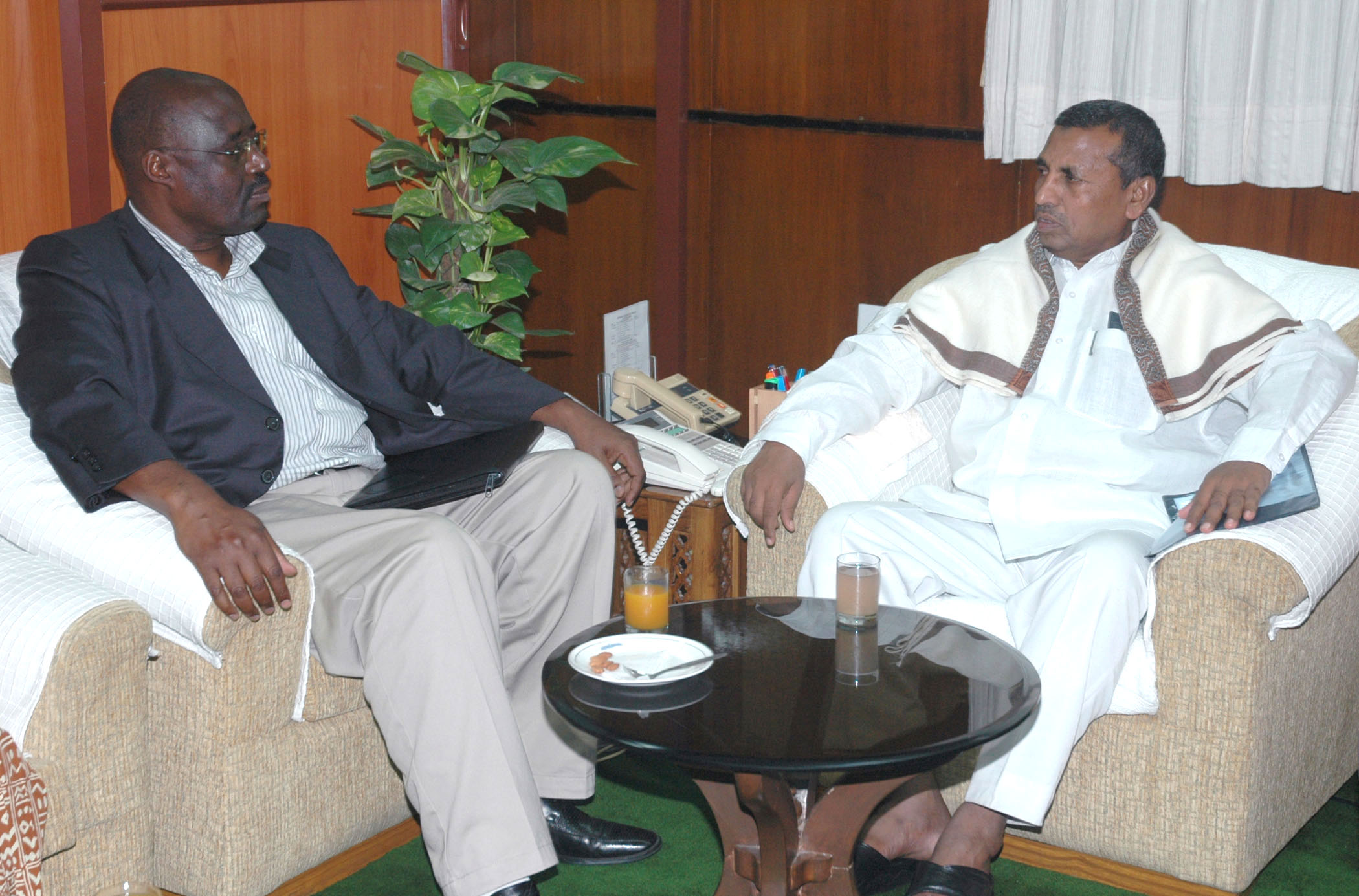
The Minister of State for Urban Development of Uganda, Mr. Urban Tibamanya calls on the Minister of State for Railways, Shri K.H. Muniyappa, in New Delhi on July 15, 2009

Urban Tibamanya is a Ugandan lawyer and politician. He was the State Minister for Urban Development in the Ugandan Cabinet from 2006 until 2011. Although the cabinet reshuffle of 2009 did not affect his cabinet post, the cabinet reshuffle of 27 May 2011 caused him to be replaced by Justine Lumumba Kasule. He also served as the elected Member of Parliament for Kashari County, Mbarara District, from 2006 until 2011. During the 2011 national election cycle, he lost to Wilberforce Rutashokwa Yaguma in the National Resistance Movement (NRM) political party primaries. He then ran as an Independent candidate, but still lost to Yaguma, who is the current incumbent MP for that constituency.

== Background and education ==
He was born in Mbarara District on 9 September 1949. His Bachelor of Laws and Master of Laws degrees were obtained from Makerere University, Uganda's oldest university. He also holds a Diploma in Legal Practice from the Law Development Center in Kampala.

== Work experience ==
Tibamanya's long and varied work history began in 1976 when he worked as Senior State Attorney in the Ministry of Justice in Kampala, serving in that capacity until 1982. During that period, he also served as the Administrative Secretary to the Commission of Inquiry into Makerere University Affairs, serving from 1976 until 1978.

From 1982 until 1984, he worked as a Legal Executive in the Nairobi law firm of Kamere & Kamere Advocates. He then moved to London and engaged in private international trade from 1985 until 1986. He worked as the managing director, Stem Limited, from 1986 until 1988. In 1988, he went back to Uganda and started his own law practice, Tibamanya Urban Advocates serving as the Managing Partner from 1988 until 2006.

From 1993 to 1995, he served as a Delegate for Kashari County, Mbarara District, to the Constituent Assembly which drafted the 1995 Ugandan Constitution. From 1998 until 1999, he served as a Commissioner on the Commission of Inquiry into Corruption in the Uganda Police Force. Since 2003, he has served as the chairman of the Board of Governors of St. Andrews Senior Secondary School, Rubindi, Kashari County, Mbarara District. He was appointed to his last cabinet post on 1 June 2006.

== Personal details ==
Tibamanya is married and has four daughters. He belongs to the NRM political party. His interests include reading, writing, traveling, and ocean swimming.

== See also ==
- Parliament of Uganda
- Cabinet of Uganda
- Mbarara District
