= Kakiika Division =

Kakiika Division is one of the six administrative divisions that make up Mbarara Municipality in Uganda. The six divisions that make up Mbarara Municipality include, Kamukuzi Division, Nyamitanga Division, Kakoba Division, Biharwe Division, Kakiika Division and Nyakayojo Division.

== Location ==
The Coordinates of Kakiika Division are Latitide: 0° 34' 10.7" (0.5696°) south Longitude: 30° 40' 27.2" (30.6742°) east Average elevation: 1,438 meters (4,718 feet)

It borders with Kakoba Division and Kamukuzi Division in the south, Biharwe Division in the west, Rubaya and Rwanyamahembe Subcounties of Mbarara District in the North, Bubaare Subcounty of Mbarara District in the West and Nyakayojo Division in the South West.

== Overview ==
The Division was annexed to Mbarara Municipality on 1 July 2014 together with Biharwe Division and Nyakayojo Division it is developing on a higher rate than the other two since its near the Central Business District.

It contains the following neighbourhoods, Makenke, Koranorya, Rwemigyina, Rwebishuri, Kyamugorani, Katebe, Migamba, Bunutsya, Kagorogoro, Nyakabungo, Kakoma, Nyarubanga, Kafunjo, Kamwe Kamwe Trading Centre, Buremba

== Population ==
The 2014 National Population and housing census established the population of Kakiika Division to be with 21973.

== Points of interest ==
- Mbarara Northern bypass road
- Koranorya Market
- Coca-Cola Plant
- Kyamugorani Prison
- Eden International School
- Mbarara Community Hospital

== See also ==
- Makenke
- Mbarara
- Kakoba Division
