= Bwizibwera =

- Interactive map of Bwizibwera
- Coordinates: 00°08′05″S 30°29′42″E
- District: Mbarara District
- Elevation: 1,415 m (4,642 ft)
- Time zone: UTC3 (EAT)

Bwizibwera is a township located in Kashari South County, Mbarara District, Uganda. After Mbarara Municipality was elevated to city status in 2020, the Mbarara District's headquarters were moved to Bwzibwera. As of 2024, Bwizibweera was part of the Bwizibwera-Rutooma Town Council.

== Location ==
Bwizibwera is located approximately 27 kilometres (17 mi), by road, northwest of Mbarara town the largest town in the Western Region, Uganda on Ibanda road.

== Overview ==
Bwizibwera (Runyankore: clear waters), started as small trading town on Ibanda road. In December 2017, the township was elevated to the Town Council status. It is Kashaari County's biggest town, hosts the headquarters of Mbarara District, and is considered the most peaceful town of western Uganda.

== Points of Interest ==
- Headquarters of Kashaari County
- Health Centre IV
- EBO SACCO headquarters
