= 2007–08 Uganda Super League =

Football season in Uganda

Uganda Super League
- Season: 2007–08
- Champions: Kampala City Council FC
- Top goalscorer: Brian Umony, KCC FC; Olobo Bruno, Police FC (15)

The 2007–08 Ugandan Super League was the 41st season of the official Ugandan football championship, the top-level football league of Uganda.

== Overview ==
The 2007–08 Uganda Super League was contested by 18 teams and was won by Kampala City Council FC, while Masaka Local Council FC, CRO FC, Ediofe Hills FC, Maroons FC and Biharwe FC were relegated.

== League standings ==
Pos	Team	Pld	W	D	L	GF	GA	GD	Pts	Qualification or relegation
1	Kampala City Council FC (C)	34	22	8	4	61	23	+38	74	Champions
2	SC Villa	34	20	9	5	52	24	+28	69	
3	Police FC	34	18	13	3	47	22	+25	67	
4	Uganda Revenue Authority SC	34	13	13	8	48	34	+14	52	
5	Victors FC	34	12	16	6	32	22	+10	52	
6	Express FC	34	12	15	7	30	20	+10	51	
7	Bunamwaya SC	34	12	15	7	31	24	+7	51	
8	Nalubaale FC	34	14	6	14	33	34	−1	48	
9	Iganga Town Council FC	34	10	12	12	29	31	−2	42	
10	Kinyara Sugar Works FC	34	10	11	13	32	39	−7	41	
11	Simba FC	34	10	10	14	38	37	+1	40	
12	Boroboro Tigers FC	34	10	9	15	29	41	−12	39	
13	Maji FC	34	10	8	16	35	42	−7	38	
14	Masaka Local Council FC (R)	34	8	10	16	28	38	−10	34	Relegated
15	CRO FC (R)	34	6	16	12	28	40	−12	34	Relegated
16	Ediofe Hills FC (R)	34	9	7	18	34	57	−23	34	Relegated
17	Maroons FC (R)	34	9	5	20	25	53	−28	32	Relegated
18	Biharwe FC (R)	34	5	9	20	26	57	−31	24	Relegated

(C) Champions; (R) Relegated

== Leading goalscorer ==
The top goalscorers in the 2007–08 season were Brian Umony (Kampala City Council FC) and Olobo Bruno (Police FC) with 15 goals each.
