= Kamukuzi Division =

Division of Mbarara, Uganda

Kamukuzi Division is one of the six divisions that make up Mbarara City. The six divisions that make up Mbarara are: Nyamitanga Division, Kamukuzi Division, Kakoba Division, Biharwe Division, Kakiika Division and Nyakayojo Division.

== Location ==
Kamukuzi Division is located in Mbarara Municipality, it covers the northern part of Central Business District. It is located north of the Central Business District, bordering with Kakoba Division in the East, Nyamitanga Division in the South, Kakiika Division in the North and the West and Nyakayojo Division in the South west.

== Overview ==
Kamukuzi is the 2nd smallest division in size in Mbarara Municipality with 1,610 hectares, 2nd to Kakoba which has 1,308 hectares.

Kamukuzi Division covers part of the Central Business District with streets of Makhan Singh street, Bwana Victor street, Stanley road and Ntare road.

The division also contains the following neighbourhoods Kamukuzi hill, Ruharo hill, Booma hill and Nkokonjeru hill, all which are upscale residential areas with offices of major Organizations and corporate bodies, Biafra, Andrews, Ntare, Kashanyarazi, Rwebikoona, Kiyanja and Taso Village.

The division holds the Mbarara District headquarters, Mbarara Municipal Council headquarters and Ankole Kingdom headquarters though it is not yet restored as of 2015.

== Population ==
Kamukuzi Division is the 3rd most populous division in Mbarara Municipality after Kakoba and Nyakayojo as of 2014 census report.

The 2002 population census report estimated the population of Kamukuzi to be 23,470, in 2011 the population was estimated to be 34,879, In the 2014 population census, Kamukuzi was found containing 34,014 people.

== Points of interest ==
- Nkokonjeru Royal Tombs
- Mugaba, the Omugabe Palace
- A branch of Makerere University Business School
- A branch of Uganda Management Institute
- Ruharo Cathedral, the see of the Anglican dioceses of Ankole and Kigezi
- Ntare School
- Mbarara High School
- Mbarara University

== See also ==
- Mbarara
- Kakoba Division
