= Horns of the cattle monument =

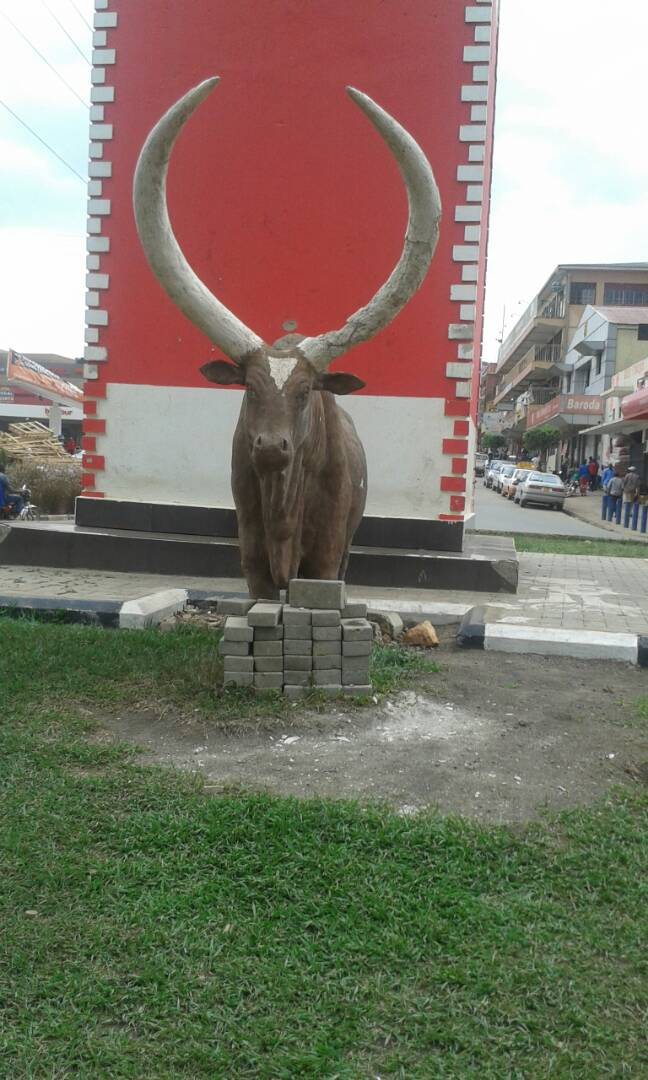

The horns of the cattle monument (Amahembe g'ente) is a monument in Mbarara Town, Western Uganda.

The monument depicts the common locally known word that Mbarara is the land of Milk and Honey. The monument welcomes you to the main city in the Western Region, Uganda. Amahembe g'ente monument is at the main entrance of mbarara town and it has gone under different transitions. The original monument was demolished during the construction of the Airtel Tower
