= Biharwe Division =

Division in Mbarara City, Uganda

Biharwe Division is one of the six administrative divisions that make up Mbarara Municipality of Western Uganda. The six divisions that make Mbarara Municipality include, Kamukuzi Division, Nyamitanga Division, Kakoba Division, Biharwe Division, Kakiika Division and Nyakayojo Division.

== Location ==
Biharwe Division borders with Kiruhura District in the east, Kakiika Division in the West and south, and Rubaya Subcounty of Mbarara District in the North.

== Overview ==
Biharwe Division was added to Mbarara Municipality on 1 July 2014 together with Nyakayojo Division and Kakiika Division. The Division contains mainly farmers with its headquarters at Biharwe. The area is also a home to the football club Biharwe F.C.

The neighborhoods with in the division include: Biharwe town Kamatarasi, Kishasha, Katojo, Nyabuhama, Nyaruhanga, Nyakinengo, Rwemikunyu, Rwenjeru, Kibwera and Migamba.

== Population ==
The 2014 National Population and housing census found the population of Biharwe Division at 21,941

== Points of interest ==
- Igongo cultural centre a 3 star hotel.
- The 1520 AD Eclipse monument.

== See also ==
- Biharwe
- Biharwe F.C.
- Mbarara
