= Clare Mugumya =

Ugandan politician and Isingiro district MP

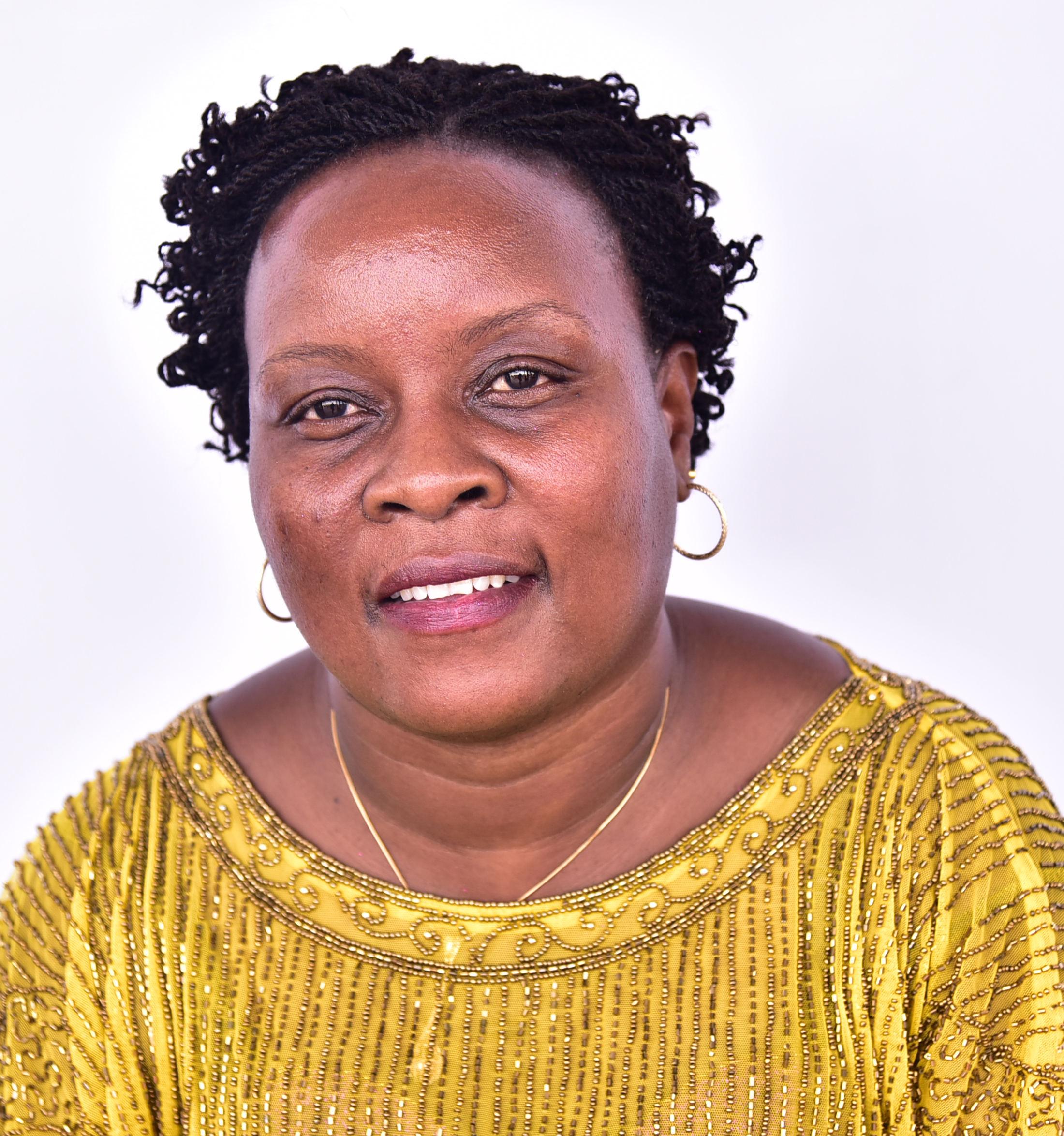
- Born: Weijahe Clare
- Citizenship: Uganda
- Occupations: Politician, legislator
- Years active: 2021–present
- Known for: Woman Member of Parliament for Isingiro District
- Notable work: Founder of the Clare Mugumya Foundation
- Political party: National Resistance Movement

Clare Mugumya is a Ugandan politician and legislator. She is the woman MP for Isingiro district under National Resistance Movement in the eleventh parliament.

== Political and social background ==
Clare contested for the woman MP seat for Isingiro district in 2021 and won the election with 105,244. She is on the of committee of Government Assurances and Implementations that visited Mubende Regional Referral Hospital management over the CT scan fees.

On 18 August 2014, Clare changed her name from Weijahe Clare to Mugumya Clare.

Clare is the founder of Clare Mugumya which partnership with Metropolitan University to offer bursary to student.

== See also ==
- Grace Namara
- List of members of the eleventh Parliament of Uganda
- Thomas Tayebwa
- Anita Among
- Nobert Mao
