= Grace Namara =

Former Woman Member of Parliament of Lyantonde district

- Born: Grace Namara
- Citizenship: Uganda
- Occupation: Politician
- Years active: 2006–present
- Known for: Former Woman Member of Parliament for Lyantonde District
- Political party: Independent politician
- Other political affiliations: National Resistance Movement
- Spouse: Godfrey Kirumira

Grace Namara is a Ugandan politician and a legislator. She represented Lyantonde district in the eighth parliament of Uganda.

== Personal background ==
Namara is married to Mr Godfrey Kirumira, a Ugandan businessman.

== Political career ==
Namara contested the National Resistance Movement primary elections for Lyantonde district against Ruth Asiimwe Karyaju but later withdrew her interest and became an independent candidate. She is a member of the Visionary Women Sacco, a group of about 50 women MPs.

In 2010, Namara was taken to court by Kanyaruju on a civil suit, as Namara did not have the minimum academic qualification of s.6 (the Uganda Advanced Certificate of Education which is required to contest a seat in the Ugandan Parliament).
