= Kakoba Division =

Division in Mbarara City, Uganda

Kakoba Division is one of the 6 divisions that make up Mbarara Municipality, Uganda. The other 5 Divisions are as follows: 1. Kamukuzi Division, 2. Nyamitanga Division, 3. Biharwe Division, 4. Kakiika Division 5. Nyakayojo Division

== Location ==
The division covers most of the Central business district and it is located on the East and south east of the central business.

It borders with Kamukuzi Division in the west, Kakiika Division in the East and North, Nyamitanga Division and Masha of Isingiro District in the south.

== Overview ==
The division covers the part of central business district which covers the streets of High Street, Makharnsingh street, Mbaguta Street, Bishop Wills street, Bucunku road, Buremba road, and Mosque road at large The neighbourhoods in the Division include, Kisenyi, Kijungu, Surveyor cell, Kacence, Nyamityobora, Kakoba hill, Rugazi, Kyapotani, Rwentondo, Nyakaizi and Buremba, Kiswahili cell, Kenkombe.

== Population ==
Kakoba Division is the most populous Division in Mbarara.

The 2002 Census estimated the population of Kakoba Division at 34,271. In 2011, the population of Kakoba was estimated to be 50,930, the 2014 census estimated the population to be 55,519.

== Points of interest ==
- Bishop Stuart University
- Kakoba Round About
- Day Star Cathedral
- B.M.T. steel milling Machine
- Mayanja Memorial Hospital
- Kakoba Mosque
- All Saints Mbarara
