= Nyakayojo Division =

Division in Mbarara City, Western Uganda

Nyakayojo Division is one of the six administrative divisions that make up Mbarara Municipality. The six divisions that make Mbarara Municipality include, Kamukuzi Division, Nyamitanga Division, Kakoba Division, Biharwe Division, Kakiika Division and Nyakayojo Division.

== Location ==
The coordinates of Nyakayojo Division are Latitide: 0° 38' 1" (0.6336°) south Longitude: 30° 36' 47" (30.6131°) east

Average elevation: 1,422 meters (4,665 feet)

Nyakayojo Division borders with Isingiro District and Nyamitanga Division in the East, Bubaare subcounty of Mbarara District in the North, Kakiika Division in the Northeast, Mwizi subcounty in the South, Bugamba and Rugando subcounties of Rwampara District in the west.

== Overview ==
Nyakayojo Division was added to Mbarara Municipality on 1 July 2014 together with Kakiika Division and Biharwe Division. The Mbarara Kabale road transverses through Nyakayojo.

The division is a home to a famous secondary school called Nyakayojo Secondary School, Karama Catholic community and a home area of Angella Katatumba.

Nyakayojo Division contains the following neighborhoods, Kicwamba, Katojo, Rwakishakizi, Bugashe, Nyakayojo hill, Katukuru, Kisoro, Rwariire, Kibona, Katereza and Rukiindo.

== Population ==
Nyakayojo Division is the second most populous division in Mbarara Municipality after Kakoba Division. The 2002 population census established the population of Nyakayojo as 29,396, In 2009 Uganda National Bureau of Statistics estimated the population to be 34,000, the 2014 National population and Housing Census found the population of Nyakayojo Division at 38,252 people.

== Points of Interest ==
- Nyakayojo Secondary School
- Katatumba Resort Hotel
- Karama Community

== See also ==
- Mbarara
- Nyakayojo Secondary School
- Angella Katatumba
