= River Rwizi =

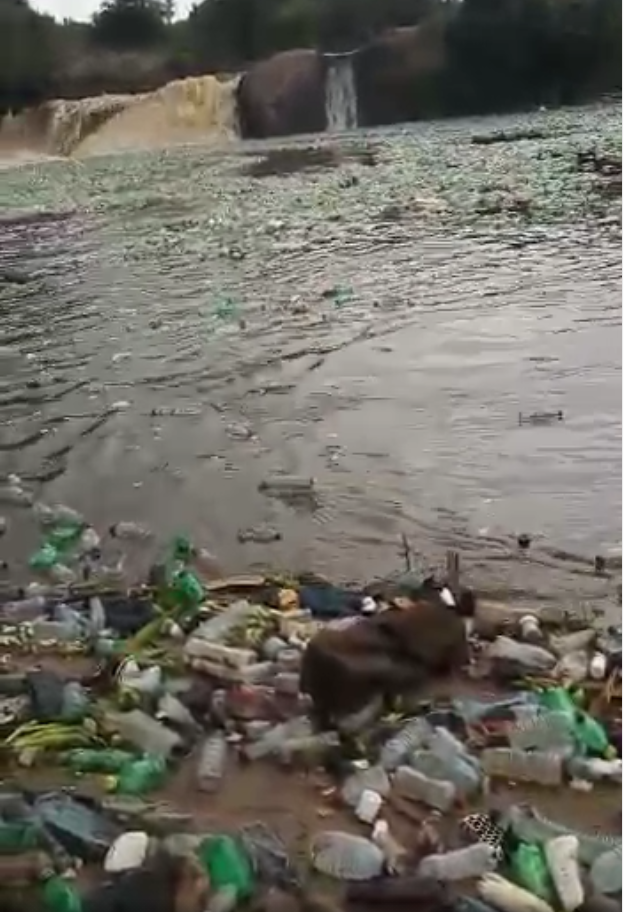
- Waste in River Rwizi

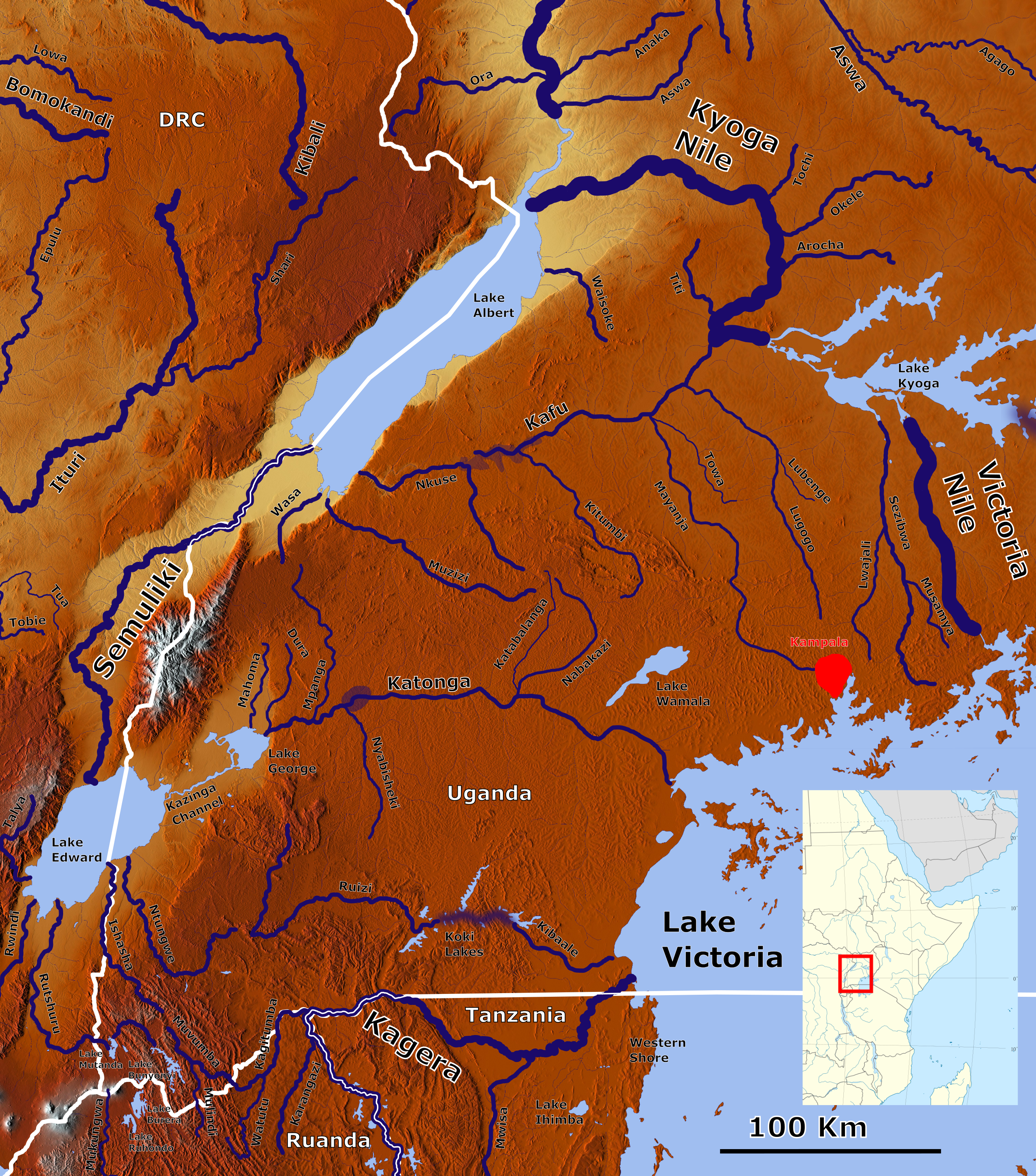
- Rivers in South West Uganda with the Ruizi (lower left center).

Location
- Country: Uganda

Physical characteristics
- Source: Buhweju hills
- Mouth
  - location: To Lake Victoria via the drainage systems of Lake Mburo, Lake Kachera and Kijanebalola.
  - coordinates: 0°41′33″S 30°54′20″E
  - elevation: 1,258 m (4,127 ft)
- Basin size: 2,282 km^{2} (881 sq mi)
- Discharge
  - location: Mbarara
  - average: 25.4 m^{3}/s (900 cu ft/s)
  - minimum: 16.5 m^{3}/s (580 cu ft/s)
  - maximum: 35.7 m^{3}/s (1,260 cu ft/s)

Basin features
- Progression: Lake Victoria—White Nile—Nile—Mediterranean Sea
- River system: Nile basin

River Rwizi is a river located in South Western Uganda in district called Mbarara. River Rwizi is a river located in southwestern Uganda. It is the second-longest river in Uganda, after the Nile River. The river originates in the hills of Buhweju District and flows through the districts of Sheema, Bushenyi, Ntungamo, Rwampara, Mbarara, Isingiro, Kiruhura, Lyantonde, Rakai, and Kyotera. It eventually empties into Lake Victoria. Many swamps feed river Rwizi, including Nyakafumura, part of the Mushasha water basin, and Kanyabukanja wetland. These marshes function as water reservoirs or catchments, gently releasing water into the river to support the surrounding population.

== History ==
The river has been an important part of the history of Uganda for centuries. It was used by the Buganda Kingdom as a transportation route and a source of water. The river was also important for the development of agriculture in the region.

In the 19th century, the river was used by the British Empire as a way to control the Buganda Kingdom. The British built a number of forts along the river, and used them to control trade and travel.

The river has also been important in the development of tourism in Uganda. Lake Mburo National Park, which is located on the banks of the river, is a popular tourist destination. The dense vegetation of papyrus and other marsh grasses near River Rwizi worked as water filters, catchment, and managed flooding in the area in the early 1950s.

== Overview ==
It originates from Buhweju hills with various tributaries from various Nkore hills including Ntungamo and Sheema hills which join it. It pours its water in Lake Victoria via the drainage systems of Lake Mburo, Lake Kachera and Kijanebalola.

The River Rwizi plays a crucial role in supplying water for both domestic and industrial purposes to various towns in the area, including Mbarara, Bwizibwera, Sanga, and Biharwe. Additionally, it serves as an important transportation route and offers opportunities for fishing and recreation.

However, the river is currently facing significant challenges. Climate change has led to drying out of the river, impacting its water levels and availability. Furthermore, the proliferation of water hyacinth, a plant known for inducing water pollution through the release of excess nutrients, has further exacerbated the river's deterioration.

The destruction of the river is also attributed to the widespread issue of land grabbing along its banks. Unregulated encroachment on the river's territory has contributed to its degradation and loss of natural habitat.

Moreover, untreated waste disposal poses a significant threat to the river's health. Various sources, including industries like the iron and steel sector in Kakoba and Mbarara, as well as hospitals, contribute to water pollution through the dumping of untreated waste products. This pollution further deteriorates the quality of the river water.

Addressing these challenges and implementing measures to conserve and restore the River Rwizi's health is essential to ensure sustainable water supply, preserve its ecosystem, and maintain its importance as a transportation route, fishing ground, and recreational area.

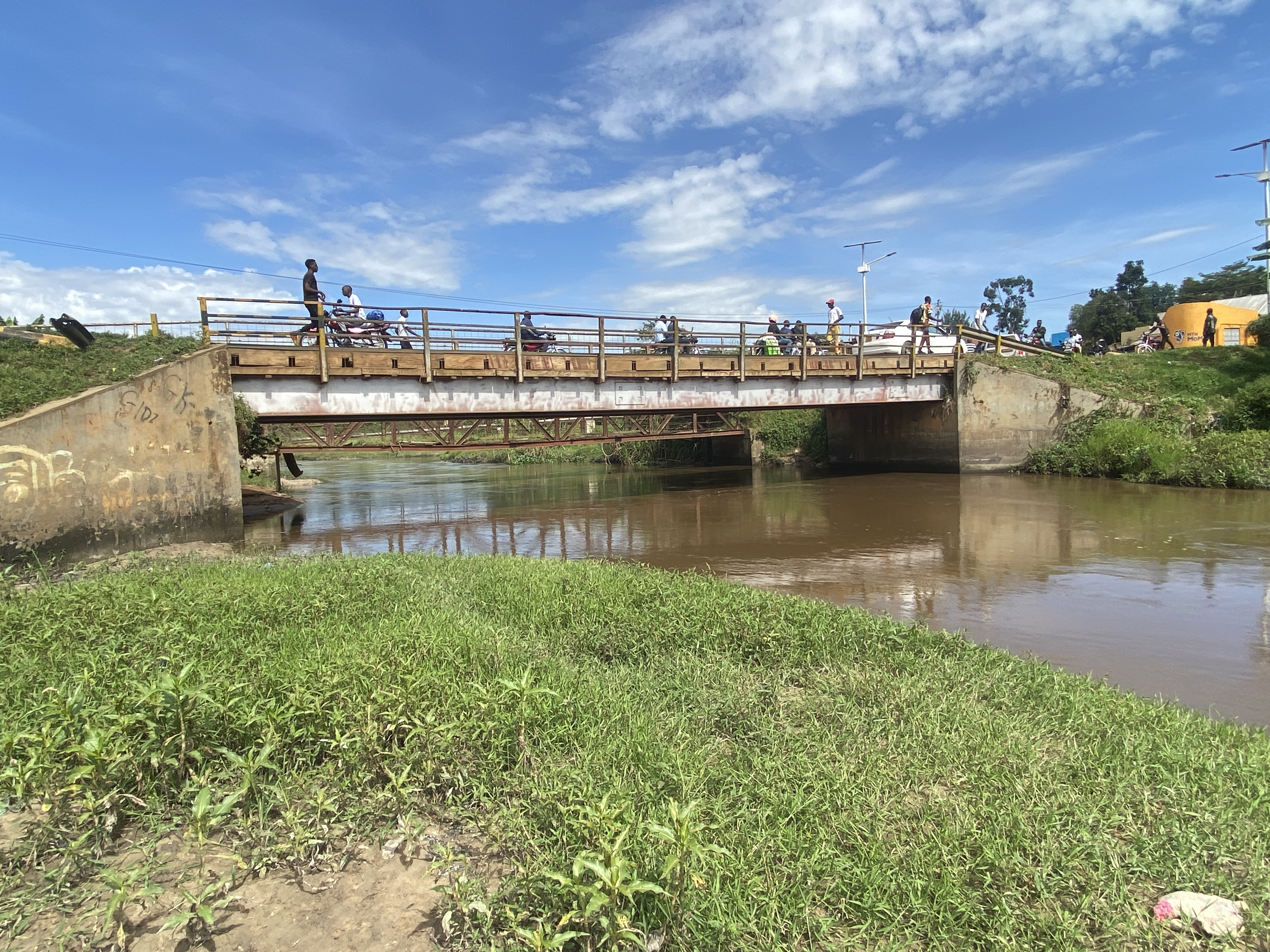
Katete bridge above river Rwizi in Mbarara in western Uganda

== Points of interest ==
The people living around the river Rwizi engage in a variety of economic activities that take place along and within its vicinity. One significant activity is farming, where the fertile land near the river has led the local community to encroach upon the wetlands for crop cultivation. This has resulted in increased yields and opportunities for livestock rearing.

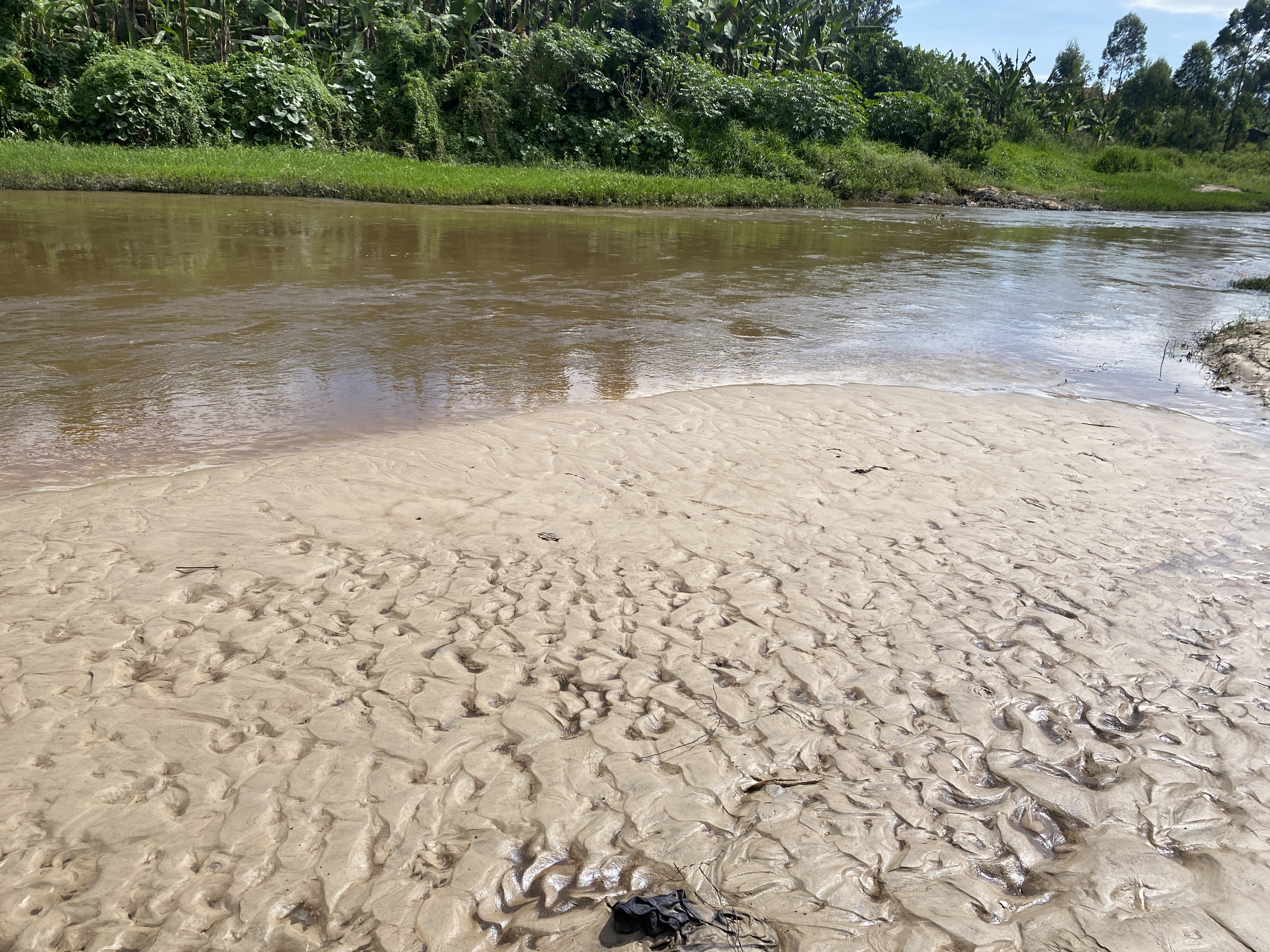
Sand deposits and vegetation around river Rwizi in Mbarara in western Ugand

Another economic endeavor is the production of bricks. Utilizing the river sand, people in the area are involved in the creation of bricks, which are sold or used for constructing dwellings.

Papyrus harvest is yet another livelihood pursued by the community. They gather papyrus from the river to craft mats, baskets, chairs, and ropes, providing them with a means of sustenance.

Fishing is a long-standing practice in the region, with individuals utilizing the river to catch fish for both personal consumption and for sale in local markets.

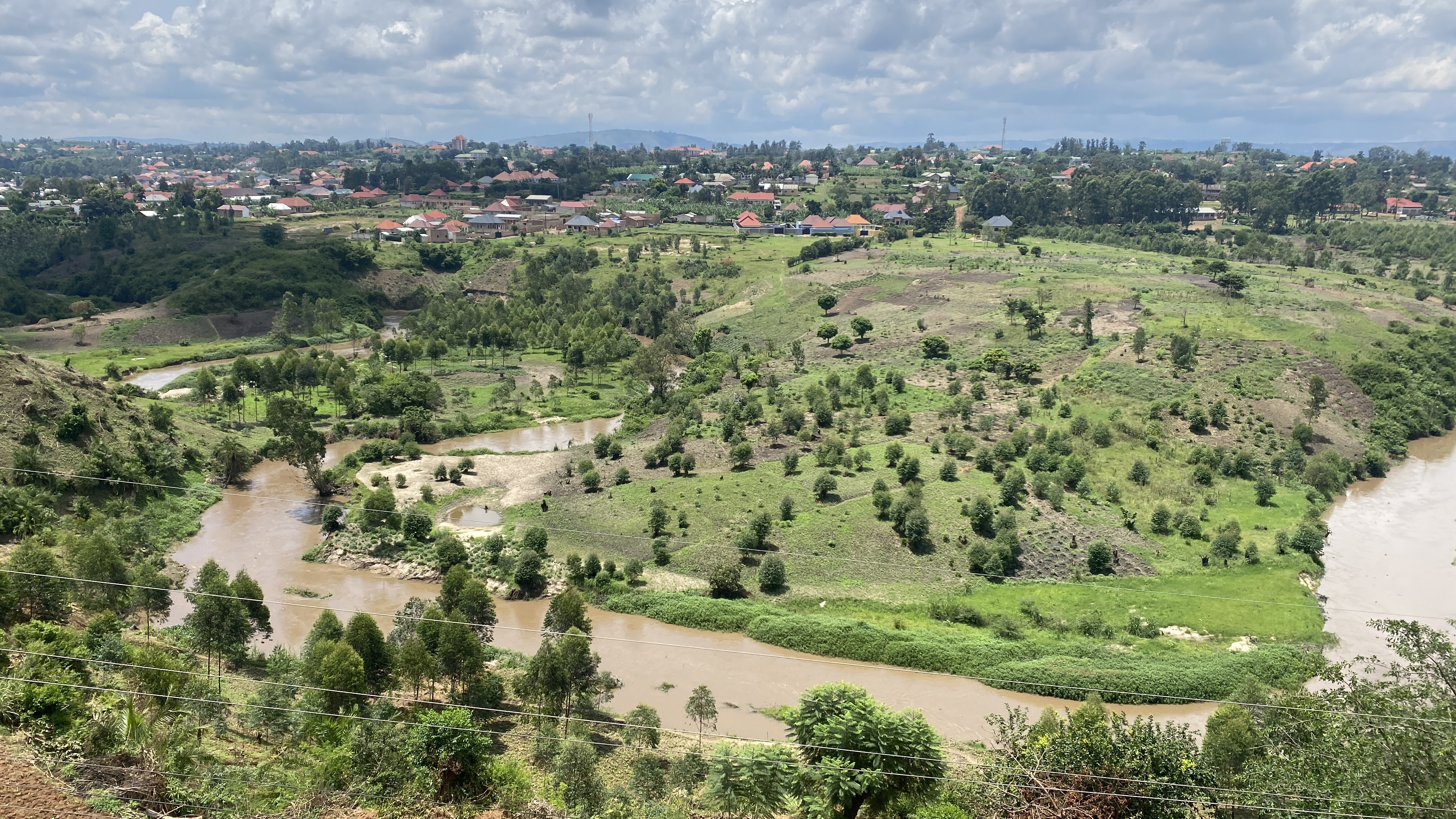
River Rwizi in Mbarara

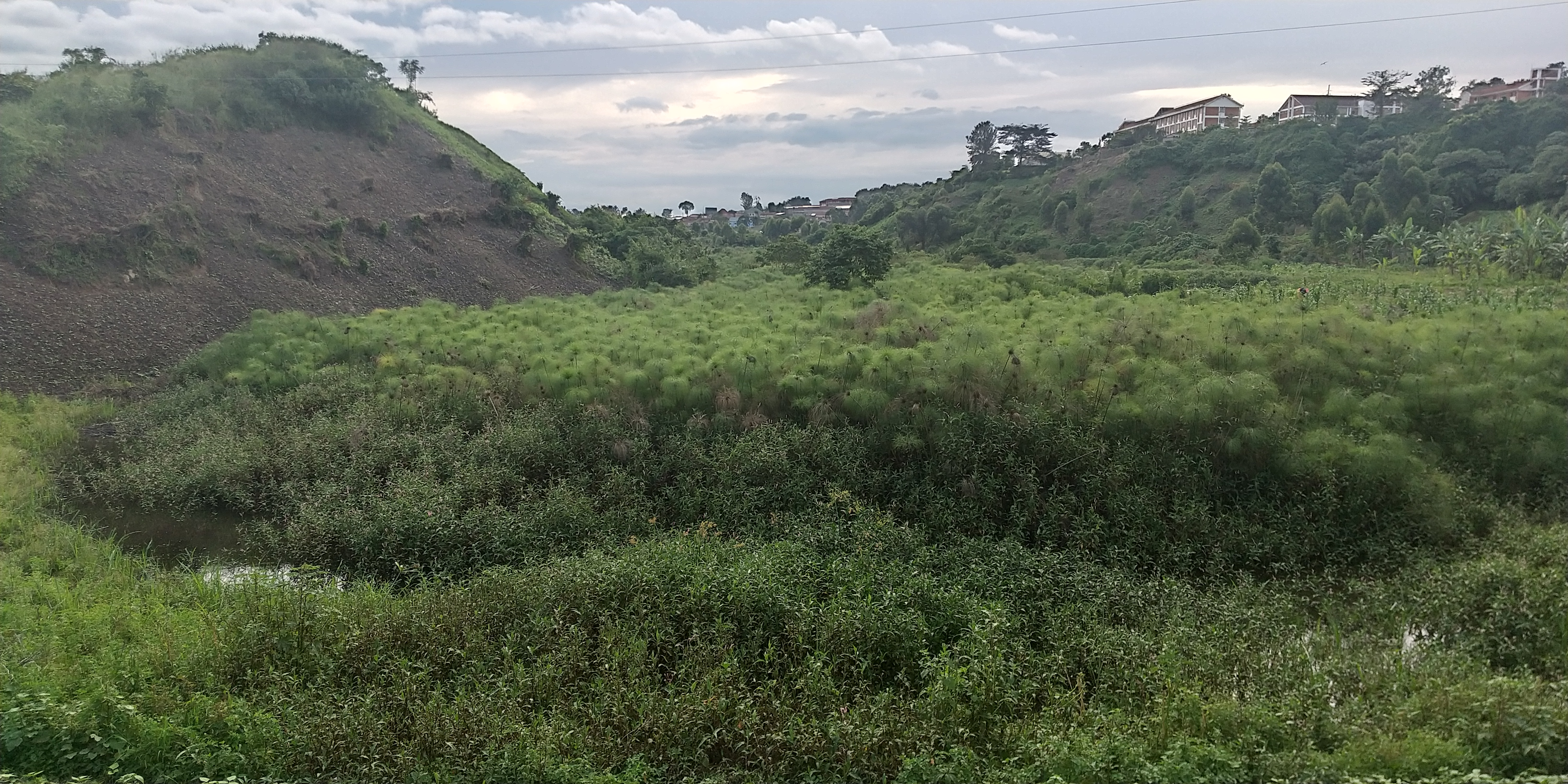
Papyrus plants in River Rwizi

It's worth noting that the river Rwizi holds several notable landmarks. The Rwizi Water Falls can be found in Katete, Mbarara, offering a picturesque sight for visitors. In addition, there is Katete Bay, which is located nearby. The Ngaro Mwenda Bridge, situated three kilometers off Kabale Road in Mbarara, serves as a significant crossing point over the river. Lastly, the area known as Rwizi Meanders is situated in close proximity to Mbarara University.

== Degradation ==
River Rwizi is grappling with a lot of issues, including pollution and climate change. These concerns endanger the river's ecosystem and its ability to deliver water and other resources to Ugandans. The river is challenged by the following;

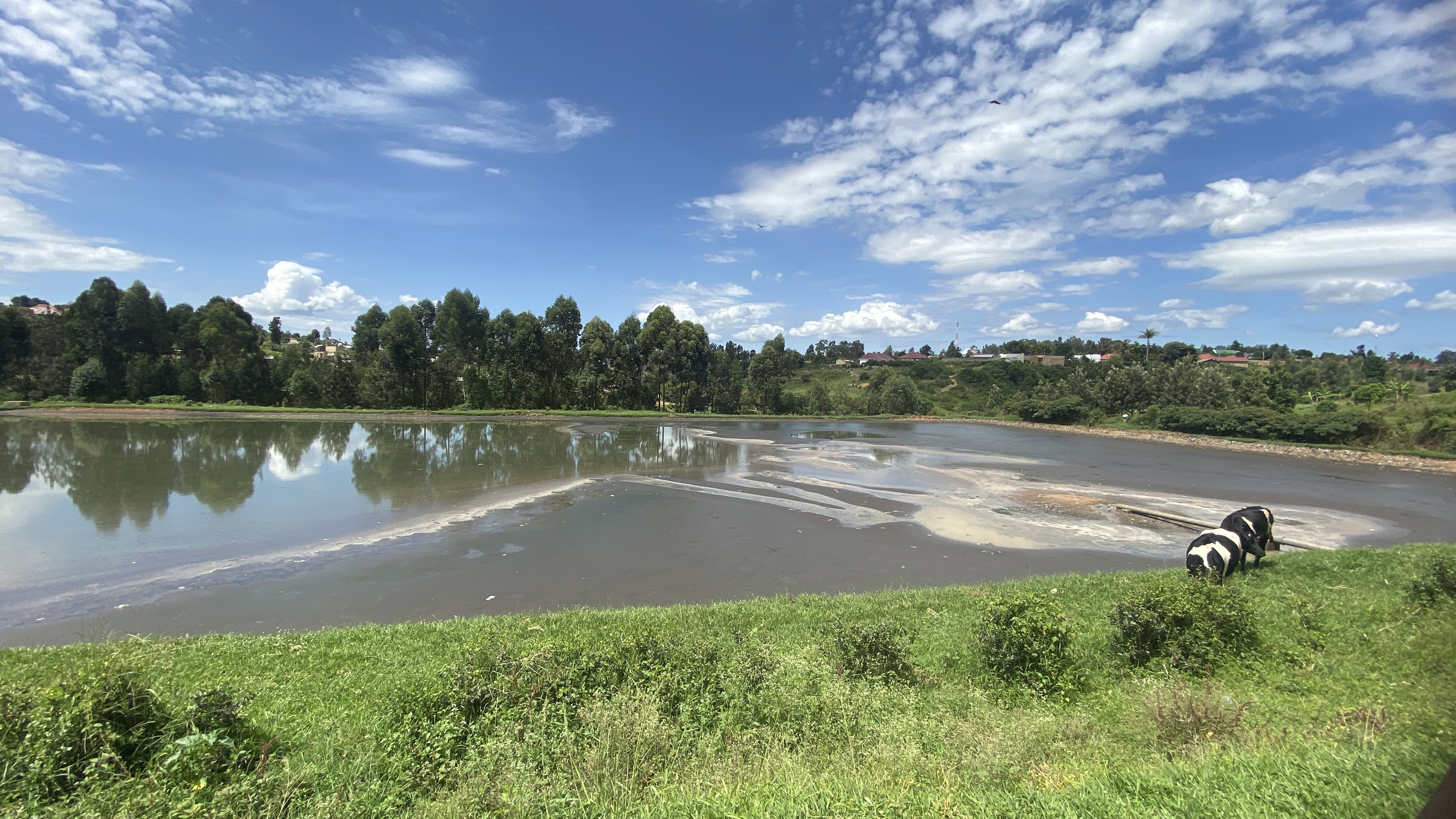
Sewage ponds located near River Rwizi in Katete in Mbarara in western Uganda

Pollution: Agricultural runoff, industrial trash, and sewage pollute the river. This pollution is wreaking havoc on the river's environment and rendering the water hazardous to drink.

Deforestation: The watershed basin of the river is being deforested at an alarming rate. This deforestation causes soil erosion and siltation, which clogs the river and makes breeding difficult for fish.

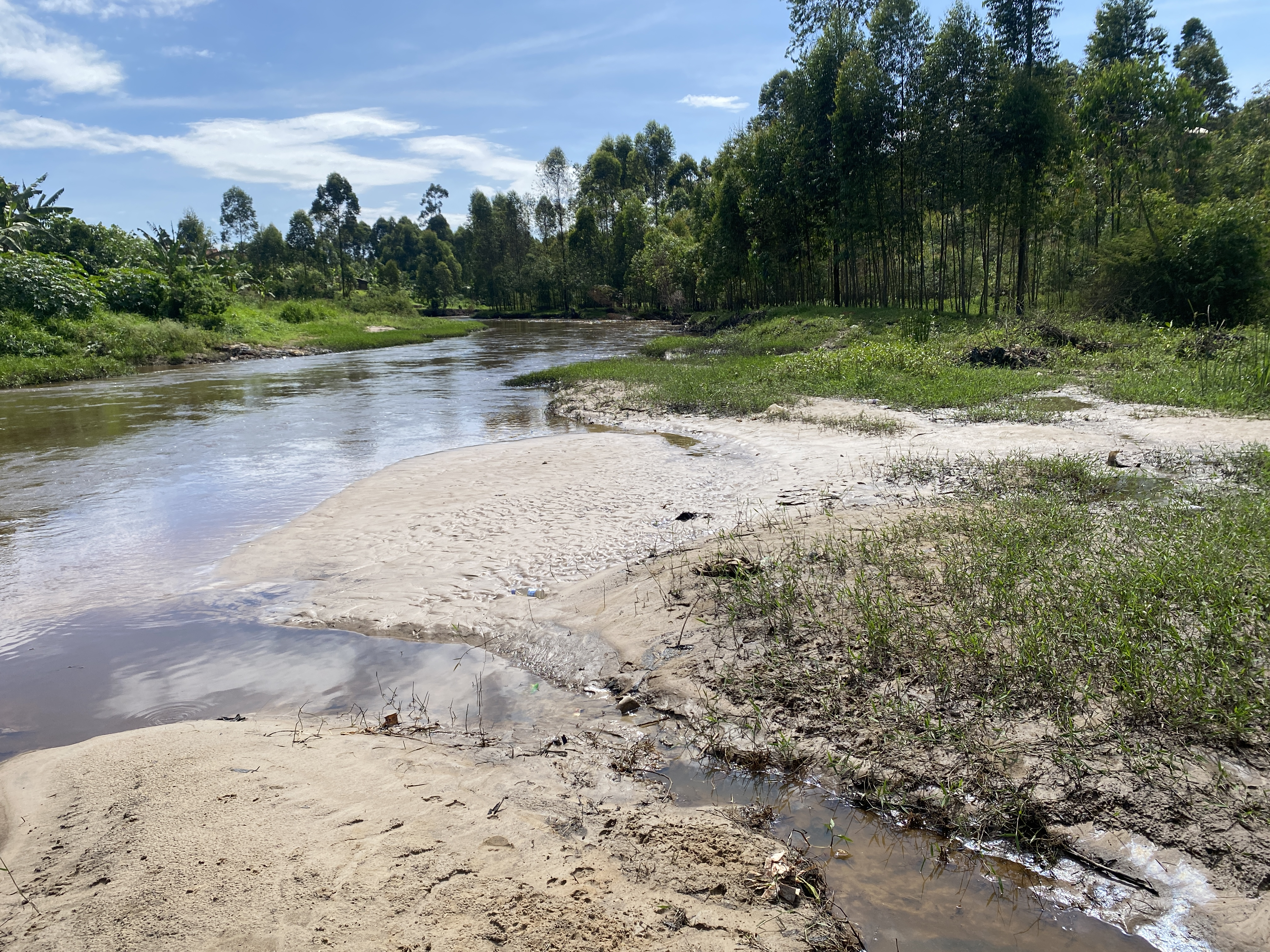
Sand deposits and vegetation around river Rwizi in Mbarara in western Uganda

Climate change is causing the river's water levels to fluctuate more irregularly. This makes crop planning tough for farmers and water access problematic for residents.

== Conservation ==
Several conservation efforts are underway to protect the river and its ecology. Among these attempts are:

Reforestation: To minimize soil erosion and siltation, trees are being planted in the river's catchment region.

Pollution control: Wastewater treatment plants are being constructed to reduce pollution entering the river. People living near the river are being educated on the importance of conservation and how they may help safeguard the river.

The Rwizi River has lost up to 80% of its water, and inhabitants are now using it as a road. This is due to illicit land acquisition in the river's catchment region of 8,700 square kilometers. Over 200 persons have illegally purchased over 500 hectares of land along the River Rwizi, destroying the river's level, which has dropped to two and a half meters below where it used to be.

Up to five million people rely on the river, including residents in Mbarara who have no other source of piped water but the Rwizi. The invasive water hyacinth has added to the river's congestion from Ndeija in Mbarara District to Sango Bay in Rakai. Poor agricultural practices are to blame.

A committee for the rehabilitation of the Rwizi catchment has been formed, with representatives from the districts that share the river. There are continuing initiatives to restore the river's catchment and water level through stakeholder engagement.

Several entities have created gabion walls at its factory in Ruharo, Mbarara, as part of this collaboration, to stabilize the river banks and prevent loose soils from collapsing into the river and silting it. The gabions stabilize the banks to prevent silting and also stabilize the water levels to allow volume monitoring to determine how much water is in the river. According to the Ministry of Water and Environment, the government has taken statutory steps to combat further environmental degradation and restore degraded regions around the country. There is a cabinet order to invalidate all wetlands land titles, and the process is ongoing. People's land titles in gazetted forest reserves are being revoked. We are attempting to demarcate all wetlands in Uganda, and the ministry is educating people about the hazards of environmental degradation.

The future of the River Rwizi is unpredictable. The river has major challenges, and it is unknown whether the river will be able to overcome them. However, the conservation efforts ongoing are encouraging, and there is optimism that the river can be preserved for future generations.

== Save River Rwizi Marathon ==
Preparations for the Save River Rwizi Marathon 2023 are beginning, and the ABAHUMUZA Development Group, which organizes this important event, is urging everyone to work together to save the only water supply that is critical to the livelihoods of over 6 million people.

The inaugural marathon was held in 2022, and the revenues were used to clean and restore the River Rwizi by planting trees along its banks.

The 2023 marathon will take place on Sunday, July 30 at the Mbarara Golf Course Grounds, beginning at 7 a.m. Among those participating in this event are the Ministry of Water and Environment, NBS Television, Taasa Obutonde, Lato Milk, National Water and Sewerage Corporation, and Mbarara City Council.

== Sources ==
- "River Rwizi will be history soon - locals". New Vision.
- "Road River: The story of a river dried by illegal land acquisitions". Earth Journalism Network. 2019-08-29.
