= Mbarara =

City in Uganda

Coordinates: 00°36′48″S 30°39′30″E

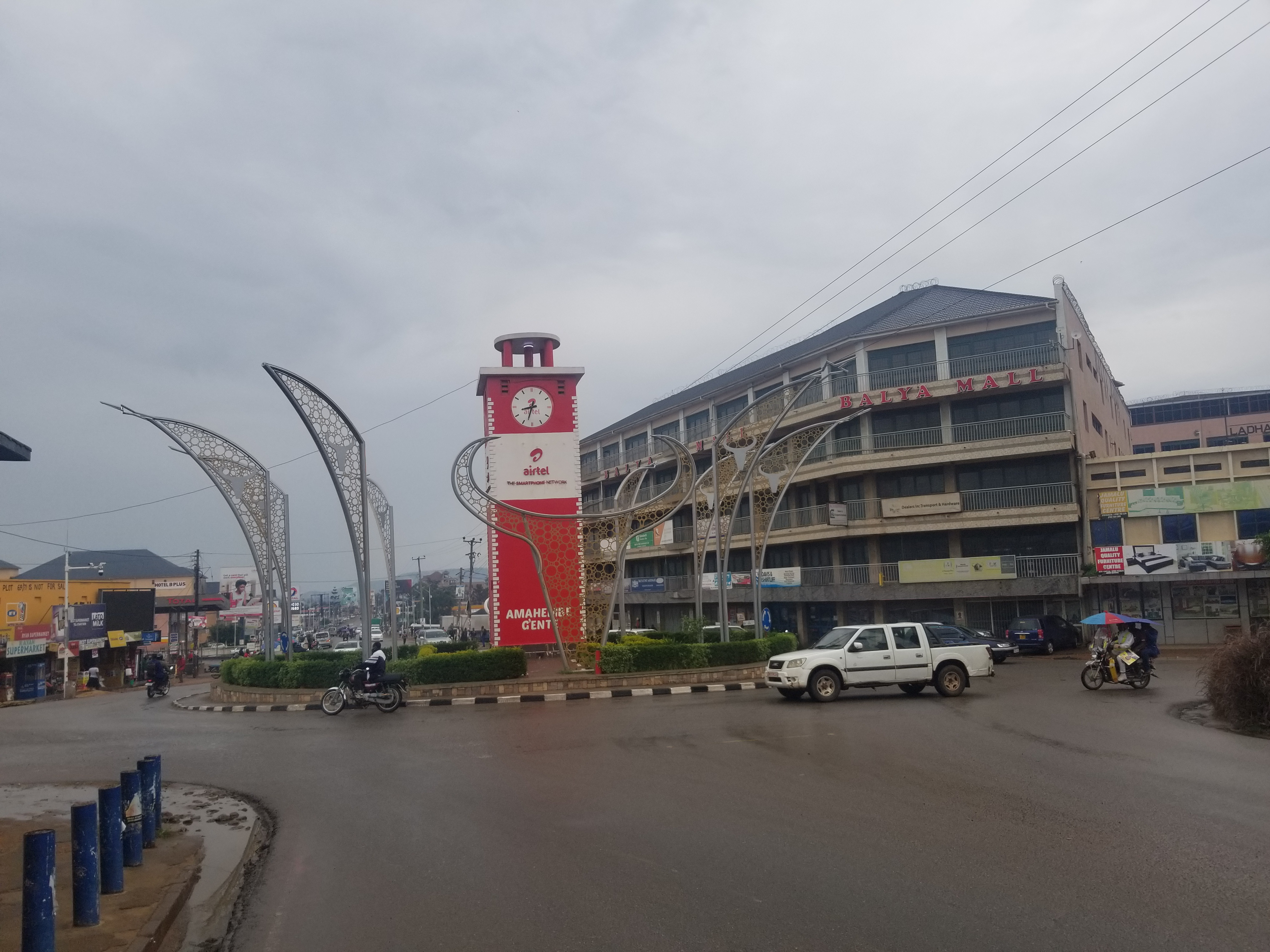
Mbarara Roundabout

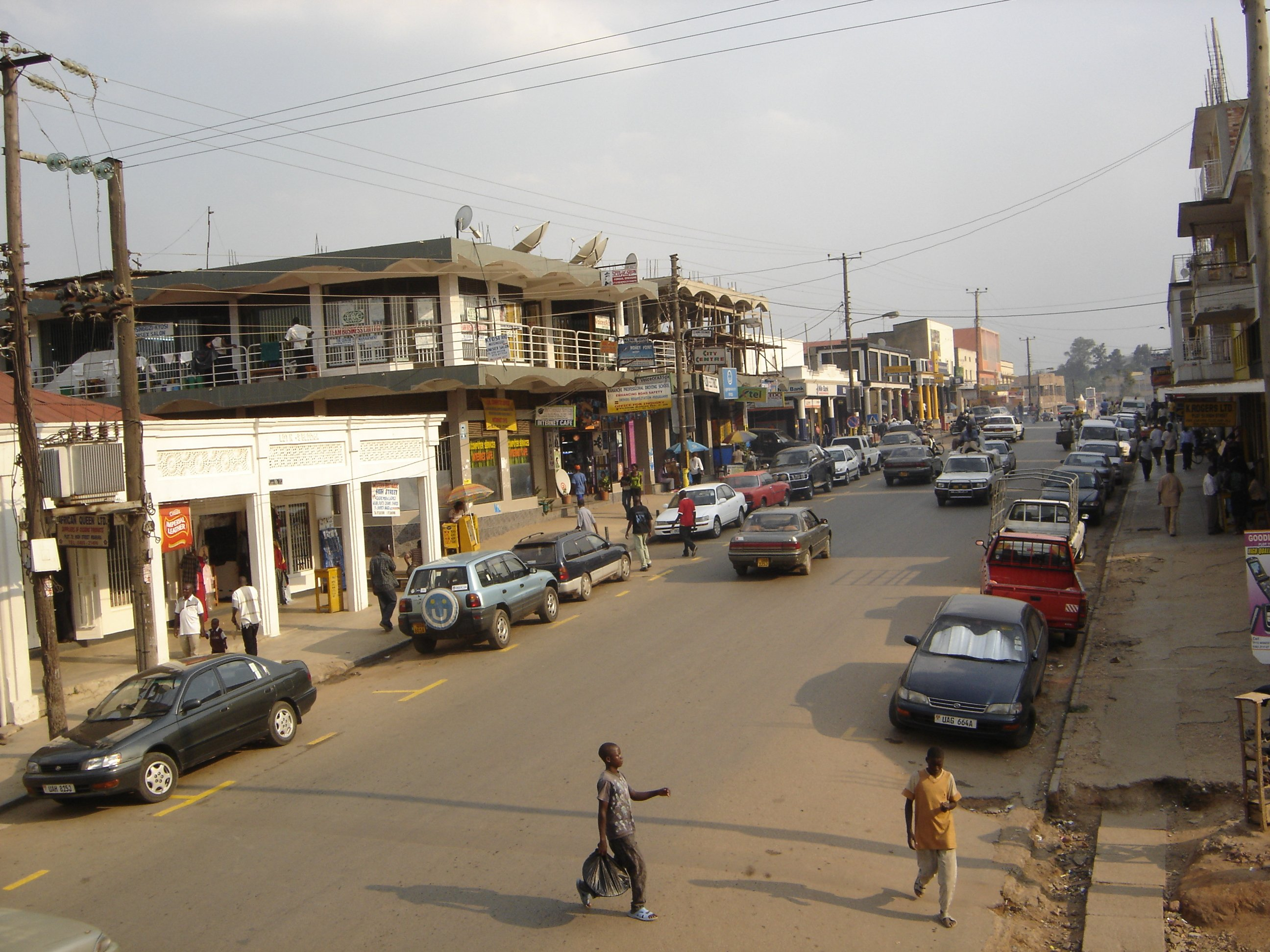
Mbarara City

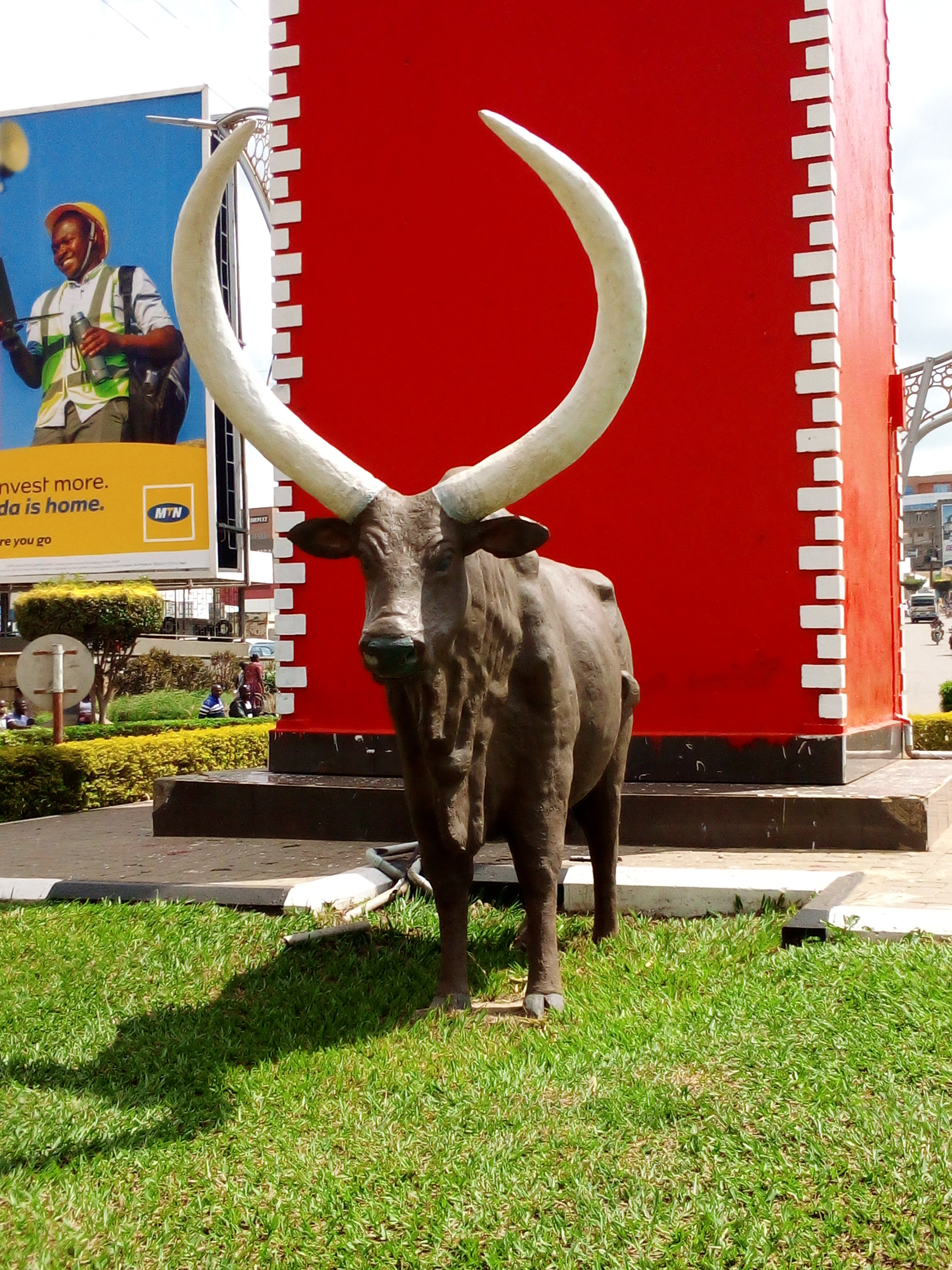
Amahembe Gente(bull) in Mbarara city

Mbarara City is a city in the Western Region of Uganda and the second largest city in Uganda after Kampala. The city is divided into 6 boroughs of Kakoba Division, Kamukuzi Division, Nyamitanga Division, Biharwe Division, Kakiika Division, Nyakayojo Division. It is the main commercial centre of most of south western districts of Uganda and the site of the district headquarters. In May 2019, the Uganda's cabinet granted Mbarara a city status, which started on 1 July 2020. The name of the municipality came from a colonial mispronunciation of Emburara (Hyperemia rufa), a tall grass that previously covered the whole area.

== Location ==
Mbarara is an important transport hub, lying west of Masaka on the road to Kabale, near Lake Mburo National Park. This is about 270 kilometres (168 mi), by road, southwest of Kampala, Uganda's capital and oldest city. The coordinates of the Mbarara central business district are 00 36 48S, 30 39 30E (Latitude:-0.6132; Longitude:30.6582). The city lies at an average elevation at about 1,147 metres (3,763 ft) above sea level.

== Wards ==
The city comprises 23 wards spread across 6 divisions and 2 constituencies.

Mbarara City Wards
Mbarara City North	Mbarara City South
Kamukuzi	Kakoba
Ruharo	Nyamityobora
Kakoma	Katete
Nyarubanga	Ruti
Rwemigyina	Bugashe
Kakiika	Katojo
Kishasha	Kichwamba
Bunutsya	Nyarubungo II
Nyabuhama	Rukindo
Rwenjeru	Rwakishakizi
Biharwe East	
Nyakinengo	
Biharwe West	
Bubaare	

== Population ==
In 2002, the national census estimated the population of the town at 69,400. The Uganda Bureau of Statistics (UBOS) estimated the population at 82,000 in 2010. In 2011, UBOS estimated the mid-year population at 83,700. In August 2014, the national population census put the population at 195,013.

Historical population
Year	Pop.	±%
1969	16,078	—
1980	23,255	+44.6%
1991	41,031	+76.4%
2002	69,363	+69.1%
2014	195,318	+181.6%
2020	221,300	+13.3%

== Climate ==
Mbarara has tropical savanna climate (Aw). Between the driest and wettest months, the difference in precipitation is 94 mm | 4 inch. The variation in annual temperature is around 2.4 °C | 4.3 °F. The month with the highest relative humidity is November (76.93%). The month with the lowest relative humidity is July (53.76%). The month with the highest number of rainy days is October (22.37 days). The month with the lowest number of rainy days is July (3.67 days). Mbarara is in the middle and the summers are that easy to define.

Climate data for Mbarara city
Month	Jan	Feb	Mar	Apr	May	Jun	Jul	Aug	Sep	Oct	Nov	Dec	Year
Mean daily maximum °C (°F)	27.1 (80.8)	28.1 (82.6)	27.2 (81.0)	25.8 (78.4)	25.5 (77.9)	26.2 (79.2)	26.9 (80.4)	26.3 (79.3)	26.2 (79.2)	25.7 (78.3)	25 (77)	25.6 (78.1)	26.3 (79.4)
Mean daily minimum °C (°F)	16.6 (61.9)	17.2 (63.0)	17.1 (62.8)	16.5 (61.7)	16.2 (61.2)	16 (61)	16 (61)	16.2 (61.2)	15.8 (60.4)	16 (61)	15.8 (60.4)	16 (61)	16.3 (61.4)
Average rainfall mm (inches)	39 (1.5)	43 (1.7)	74 (2.9)	93 (3.7)	72 (2.8)	28 (1.1)	15 (0.6)	51 (2.0)	74 (2.9)	107 (4.2)	109 (4.3)	68 (2.7)	773 (30.4)
Average rainy days	7	7	12	15	12	5	3	8	13	17	17	12	128
Mean daily sunshine hours	10.2	10.3	9.7	8.9	9.1	10.0	10.4	9.9	9.8	9.4	9.1	9.7	9.7
Source 1:
Source 2:

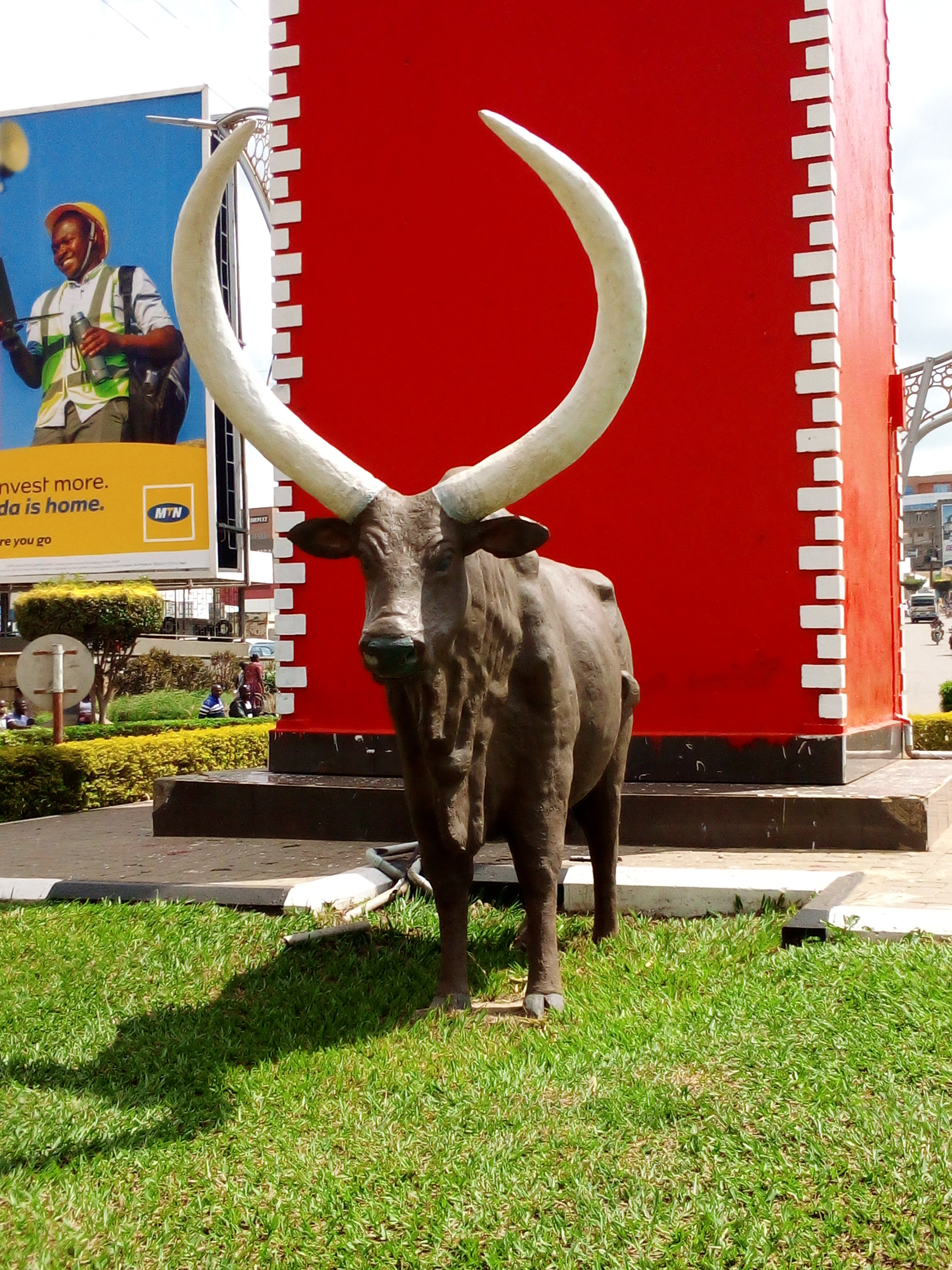
Amahembe Gente (bull) closer view

== Growth and expansion ==
Mbarara came from behind and developed to surpass Entebbe, Masaka, Gulu, and Jinja. As of 2014, Mbarara was the second-largest city in Uganda after Kampala and also second to Kampala in importance, industry, and infrastructure.

Starting with 2000, modern buildings have been established including malls, arcades, plaza, and hotels. Modern hospitals have also been constructed including Mbarara Hospital, which is now a Regional Referral Hospital, Mbarara Community Hospital, a private hospital located in Kyamugorani, Kakiika Division, and Mayanja Memorial Hospital, located in Nyamityobora Kakoba Division.

== Infrastructure ==
Mbarara is the home of Mbarara University of Science & Technology (MUST), founded in 1989.

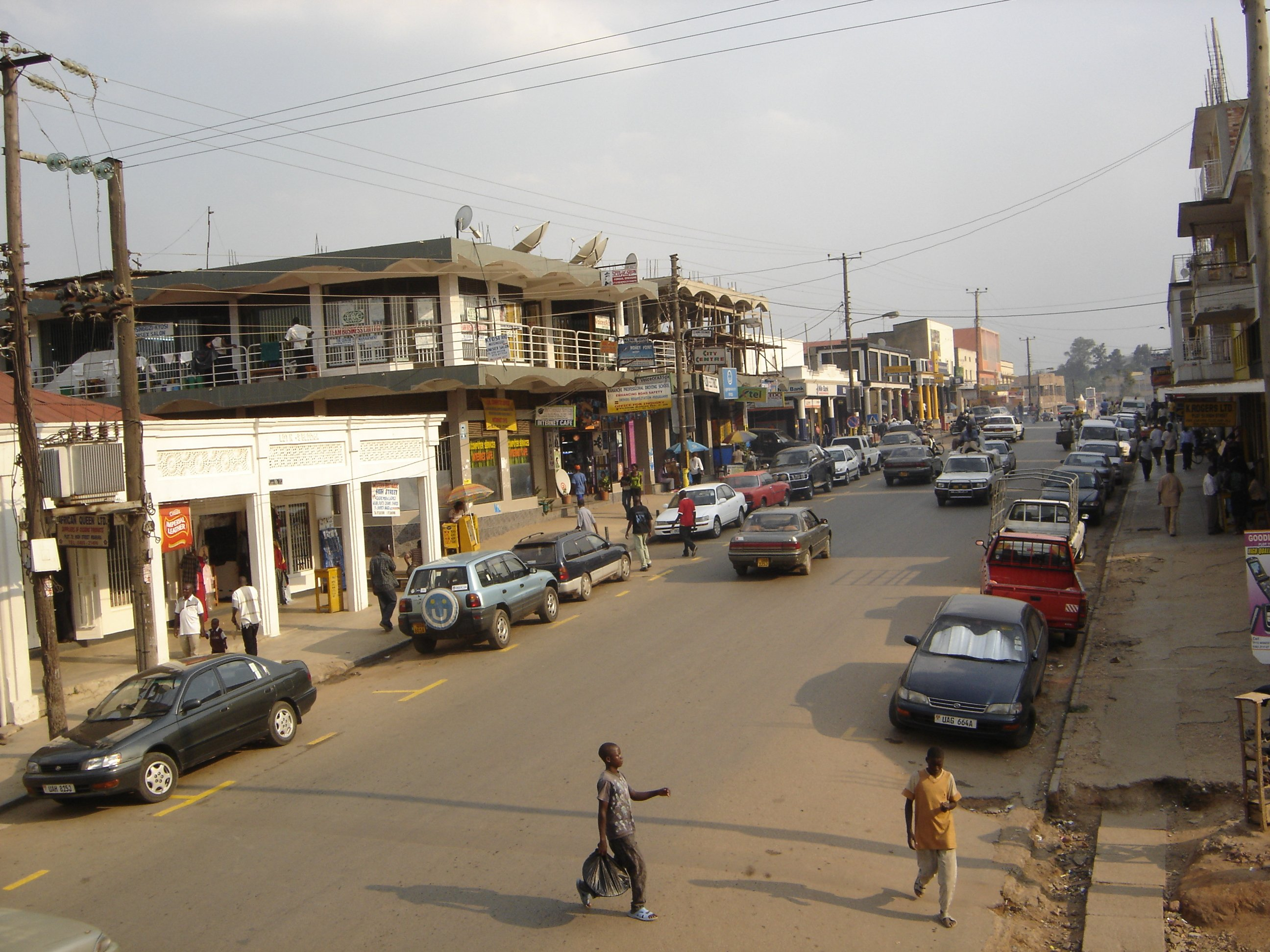
Mbarara at Sundown

With significance for all Ugandan cities, Mbarara was the host to the 2004 Annual General Meeting of the Uganda Local Governments Association on 1 October, which saw the changing of the organisation to its current structure in order to represent all Ugandan local governments. Mbarara remains an active member of this governmental association.

== Water supply ==
Due to a rapidly expanding population, the current water supply from nearby River Rwizi is insufficient to meet the future needs of Mbarara City. The Ugandan government has borrowed €120 million to source water from the Kagera River purify it and pump it to Mbarara, Masaka and Isingiro District.

== Mbarara Bypass Road ==
As part of the modernisation of the Mbarara-Katuna Road (2011 - 2015), a new northern bypass road is planned for the town. The bypass will start from the Coca-Cola Plant on Mbarara-Masaka Road at Makenke, pass through Rwebishuri and Nkokonjeru and join the Mbarara-Kabale Road at Katatumba Resort, about 5 kilometres (3.1 mi) southwest of the central business district. The bypass is expected to decongest the city centre by taking the long-distance trucks destined for and coming from Rwanda, Burundi, and the Democratic Republic of the Congo off of Mbarara's city streets. The 14 kilometres (8.7 mi) road is expected to cost about €170 million (US$210 million), of which the European Union is expected to lend about €122 million (US$153 million) with the government funding the balance from its own resources.

== Points of interest ==
The following additional points of interest lie within the city limits or close to its edges:

=== Administration ===
- Offices of Mbarara City Council

=== Industry ===
- Nile Breweries Mbarara - A subsidiary of Anheuser-Busch InBev
- Century Bottling Company Limited, Mbarara - Manufacturer and distributor of Coca-Cola products
- Mbarara Steel Plant - Owned and operated by the China Machine Building International Corporation (CMIC), a Chinese Government parastal company
- Roofings Uganda limited.
- Lato Milk - a dairy product manufacturing company founded by Pearl Dairy Farms Limited
- Ntake bakery and company Limited, Mbarara

=== Social services ===
- Mbarara Regional Referral Hospital: A 600-bed, public hospital, administered by the Uganda Ministry of Health. The teaching hospital of Mbarara University School of Medicine
- Mbarara Community Hospital: A private hospital that serves the community without regard to ability to pay.
- Mayanja Memorial Hospital: A private 100-bed hospital
- Holy Innocents Children's Hospital: A private 100-bed general pediatric hospital, administered by the Roman Catholic Archdiocese of Mbarara
- Ruharo Mission Hospital: An Anglican-based 100 bed hospital located at Ruharo Cathedral, about 4 kilometres (2.5 mi), west od downtown, along the Mbarara–Ishaka Road.

=== Education ===
- Mbarara University of Science and Technology - one of the nine public universities in Uganda
- University of Saint Joseph Mbarara - Church Founded University located on Nyamtinga Hill
- Makerere University Business School Mbarara Regional Campus
- Uganda Bible Institute
- The Western Campus of Uganda Management Institute
- Bishop Stuart University - a private Christian University, affiliated with the Church of Uganda located in Kakoba division
- Ntare School - a boys-only boarding middle and high school
- Mbarara High School - an Anglican-Church of Uganda-based residential boys-only middle and high school located at Ruharo Cathedral and is a government-aided school
- Maryhill High School- a girls-only boarding middle and high school founded by the Daughters of Mary and government aided
- Mbarara Municipal School - government sponsored school.

=== Transport ===
- Mbarara Airport - A public airport, located about 10 kilometres (6.2 mi), by road northwest of town, along Mbarara-Ibanda highway.
- Mbarara Northern Bypass Road - A 14 kilometres (9 mi) bypass road, circling the northern half of the city. Constructed between March 2015 and June 2018.

== See also ==
- Ankole sub-region
- List of cities and towns in Uganda
- Ray G
- Robert Mwesigwa
