= Mbarara district =

Mbarara District
- District
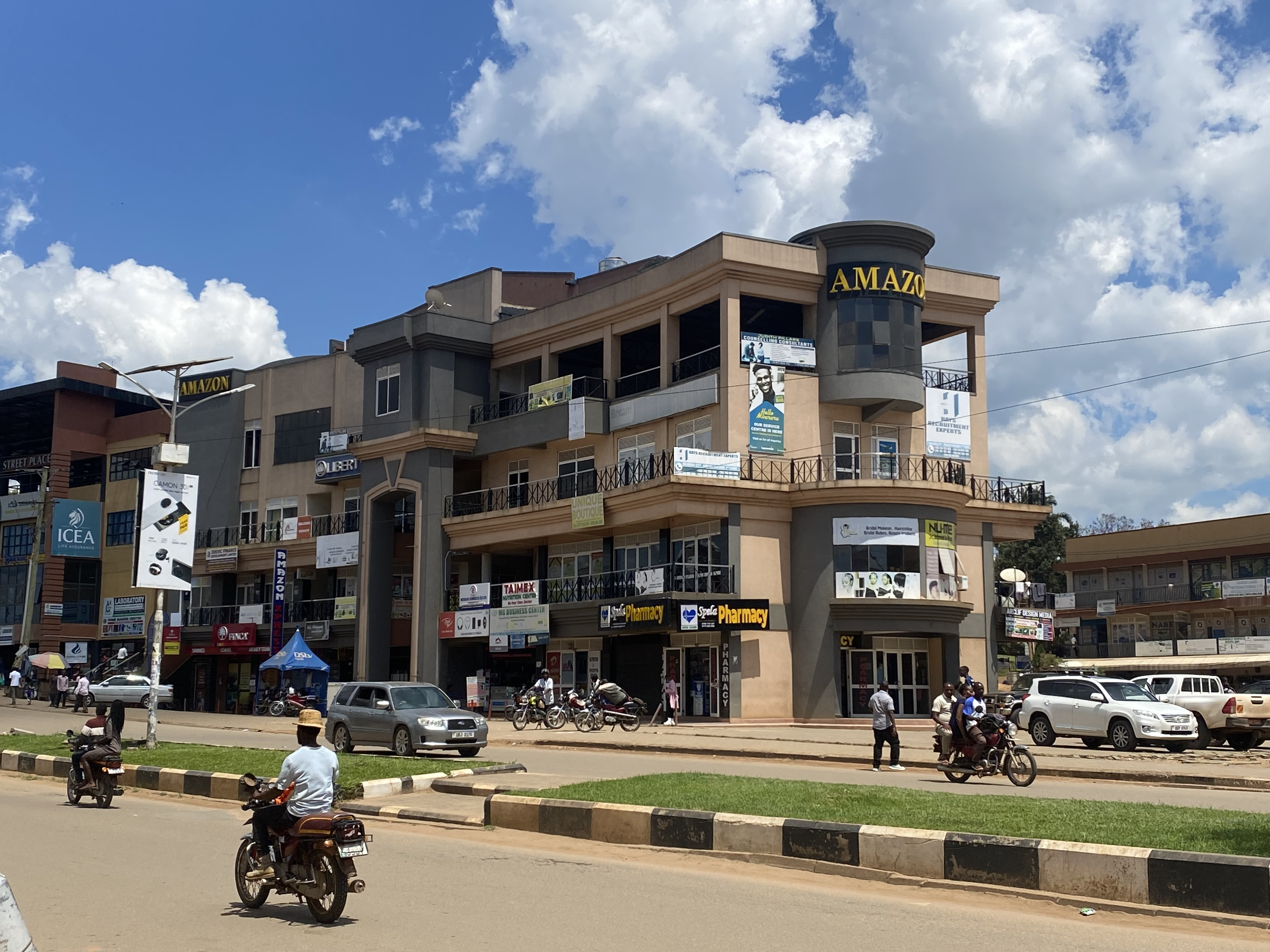
- inside Mbarara

- District location in Uganda
- Coordinates: 00°36′S 30°36′E
- Country: Uganda
- Region: Western Uganda
- Sub-region: Ankole sub-region
- Capital: Mbarara

Area
  - Total: 1,846.4 km^{2} (712.9 sq mi)
  - Land: 1,778.4 km^{2} (686.6 sq mi)
- Elevation: 1,800 m (5,900 ft)

Population (2012 Estimate)
  - Total: 445,600
  - Density: 250.6/km^{2} (649/sq mi)
- Time zone: UTC+3 (EAT)
- Area code: 027
- Website: www.mbarara.go.ug

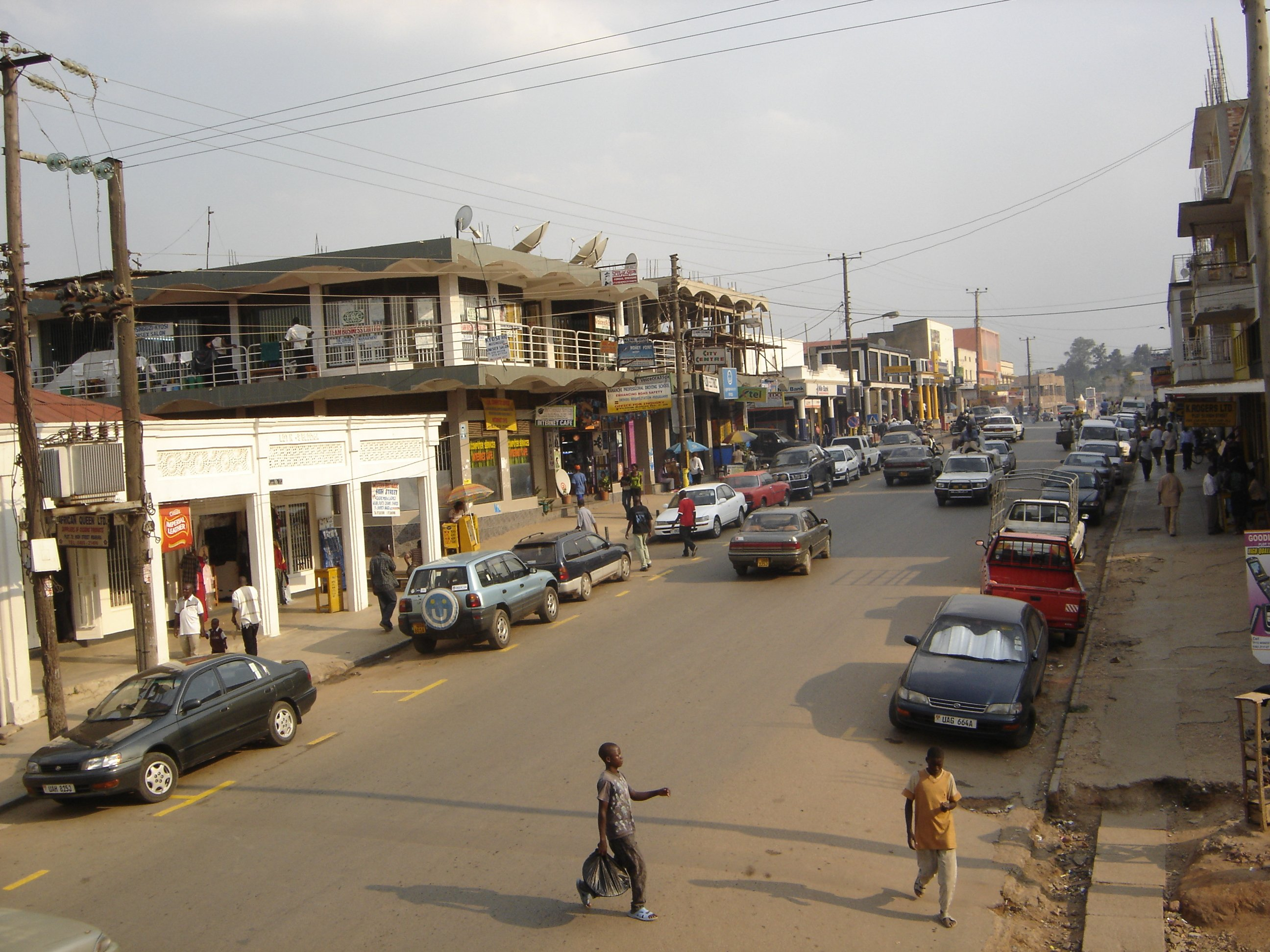
Mbarara

Mbarara District is a district in South Western Uganda. In 2019, the Ugandan Cabinet approved part of Mbarara District, the then-Mbarara municipality, to be upgraded to city status effective July 2020.

== Location ==
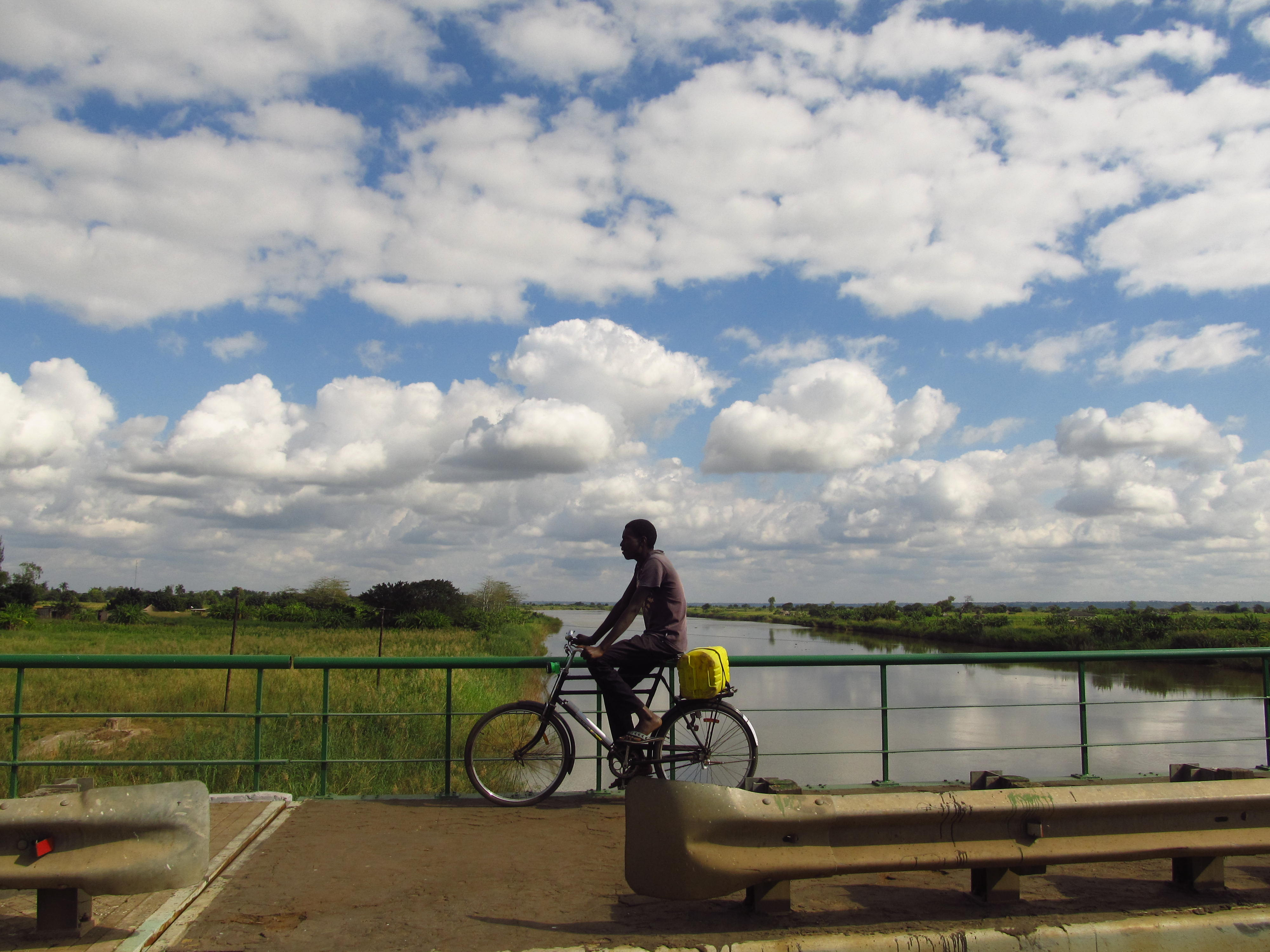
Cycling in Mbarara district

Mbarara District is bordered by Ibanda District to the north, Kiruhura District to the east, Isingiro District to the southeast, Rwampara District to the southwest, Sheema District to the west and Buhweju District to the northwest. The district headquarters at Mbarara, the largest city in the sub-region, are located approximately 290 kilometres (180 mi), by road, southwest of Kampala, Uganda's capital and largest city. The coordinates of the district are:00 36S, 30 36E.

== Overview ==
Mbarara District is part of the Ankole sub-region. The districts that comprise Ankole include: (a) Buhweju District (b) Bushenyi District (c) Ibanda District (d) Isingiro District (e) Kiruhura District (f) Mbarara District (g) Mitooma District (h) Ntungamo District (i) Rubirizi District, and (j) Sheema District.

The area covered by the above districts constituted the traditional Ankole Kingdom. In 1967, Milton Obote abolished the traditional kingdoms in Uganda. When Yoweri Museveni re-established them in 1993, Ankole did not re-constitute itself.

Mbarara district consists of one municipality (Mbarara Municipality), and nineteen rural sub-counties, organized into two counties. Mbarara District covers a land area of 1,778.4 square kilometres (686.6 mi^{2}), with an average elevation of about 1,800 metres (5,900 ft) above sea level. The district receives an average annual rainfall of 1,200 millimetres (47 in). Temperatures range between 17 °C (63 °F) and 30 °C (86 °F).

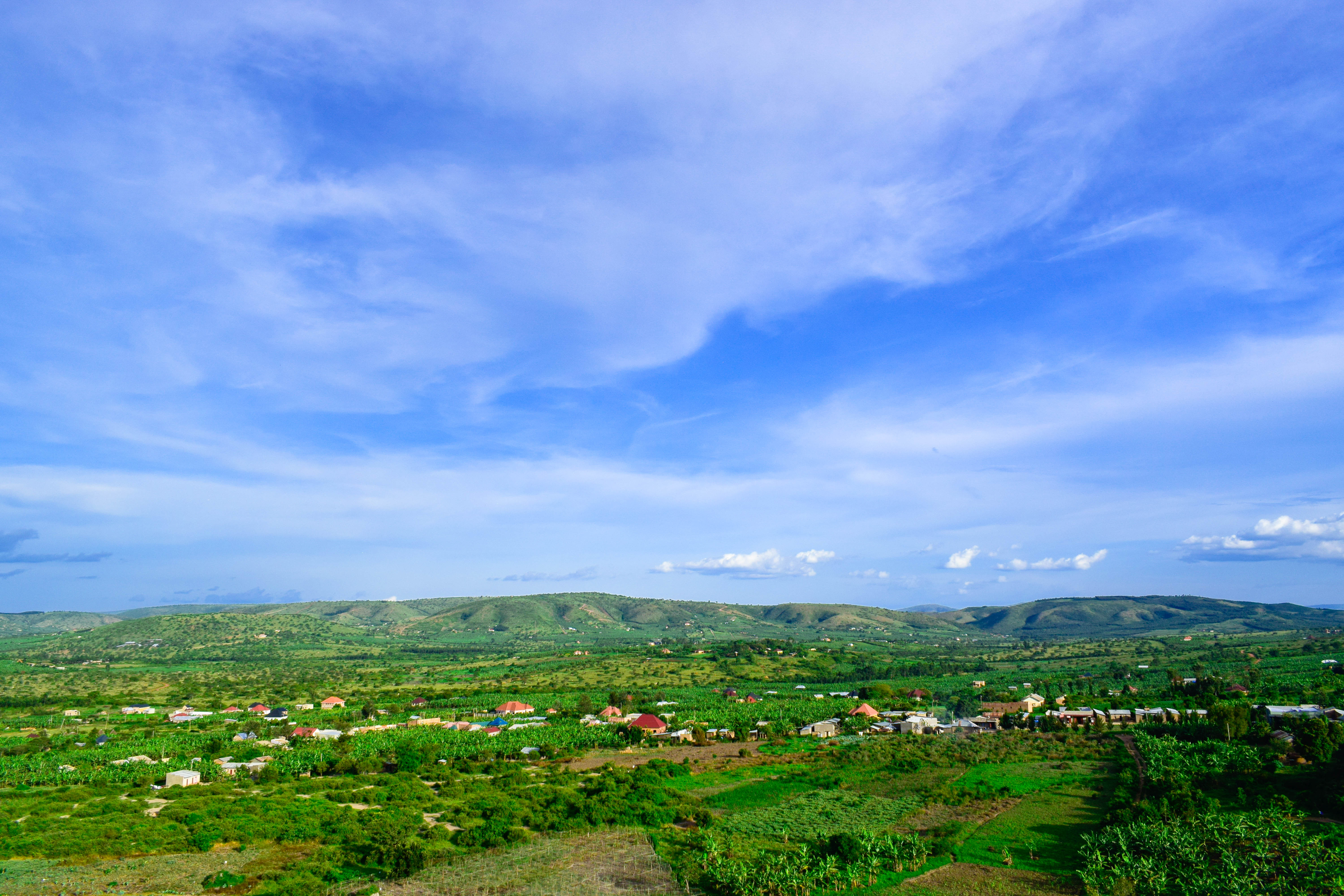
Balmy weather on Biharwe Hill overlooking Biharwe area Mbarara District

The district is subdivided into one municipal council, Mbarara Municipality, and 13 sub-counties, namely: 1. Kashari 2. Bubaare 3. Bukiro 4. Kagongi 5. Kakiika 6. Kashare 7. Rubaya 8. Rubindi 9. Rwanyamahembe 10. Biharwe 11. Kakoba 12. Kamukuzi 13. Nyamitanga.

== Population ==
In 1991, the national census put the population of the district at about 267,500. The 2002 census estimated the district population at about 361,500, of which 51% were female and 49% were male. The estimated growth rate was about 2.2%. 55% of the district population was aged between 0 and 18 years. In 2012, the district population was estimated at approximately 445,600.

== Economic activities ==
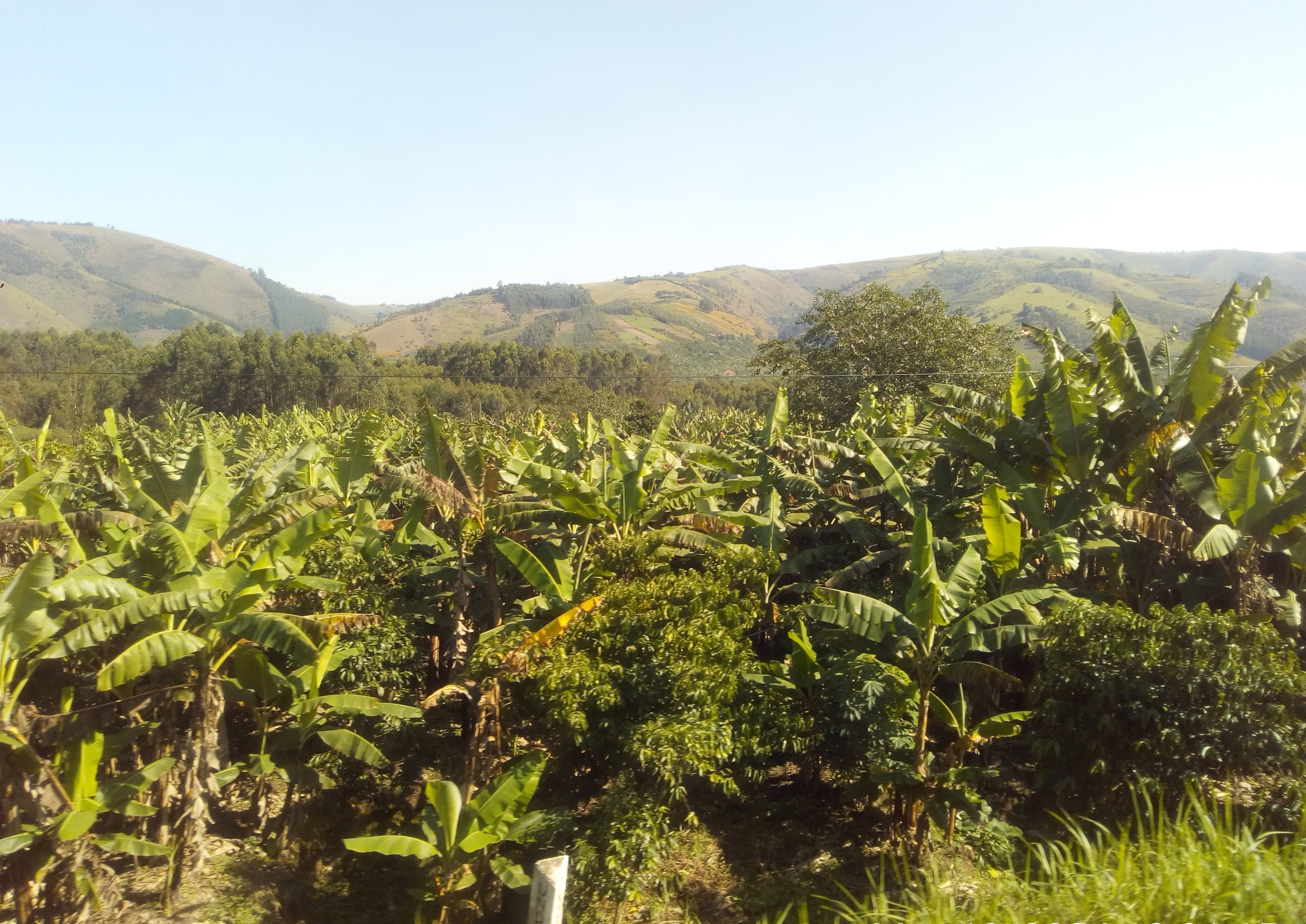
A Banana Plantation along Kabale-Mbarara Highway

As is the case with the majority of Ugandan districts, agriculture is the mainstay of the economy of Mbarara District. Both crops and livestock are raised in the district, primarily on a subsistence level, but several commercial farms are located in the district. Crops grown include:

- Matooke
- Sweet Bananas
- Beans
- Sweet Potatoes
- Irish Potatoes
- Millet
- Cabbage
- Tomatoes
- Pineapples
- Avocado
- Passionfruit
- Papaya
- Mangoes

== The livestock raised in the district includes: ==
- Ankole cattle
- Exotic cattle
- Hybrid cattle
- Goats
- Sheep
- Pigs
- Rabbits
- Chicken
- Ducks
- Guineafowl
- Turkeys

== Tourism ==
The main tourist attractions in Mbarara District include the following:

Lake Mburo National Park

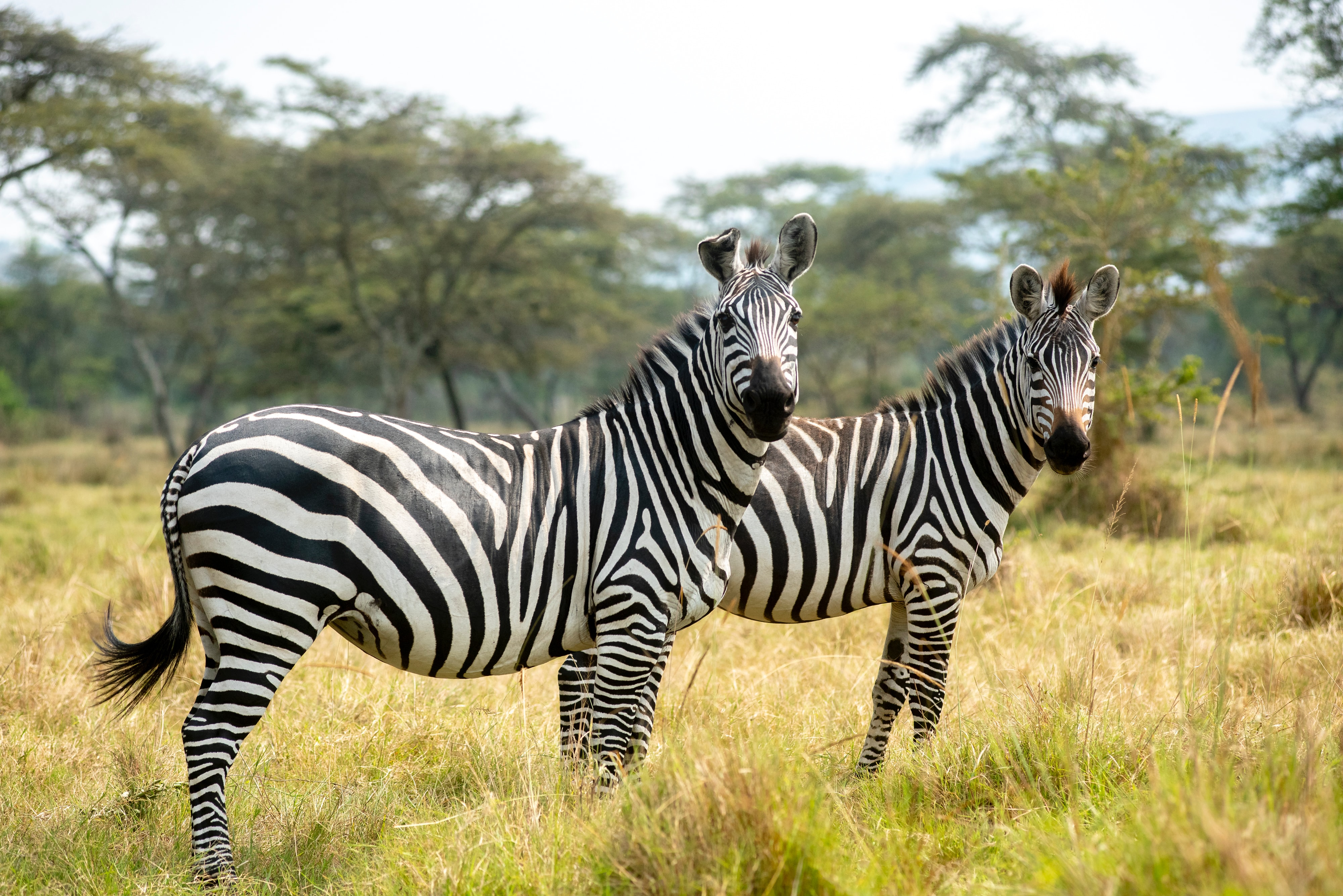
Grants zebras in Lake Mburo National Park, Uganda

Lake Mburo National Park is located about 30 km east of Mbarara Town. The park size is approximately 370 km^{2} and was named after Lake Mburo which occupies about 20% of its total area. The park is home to zebras, impalas, elands, leopards, hippos, hyenas, Defassa waterbucks, buffaloes and about 350 bird species.

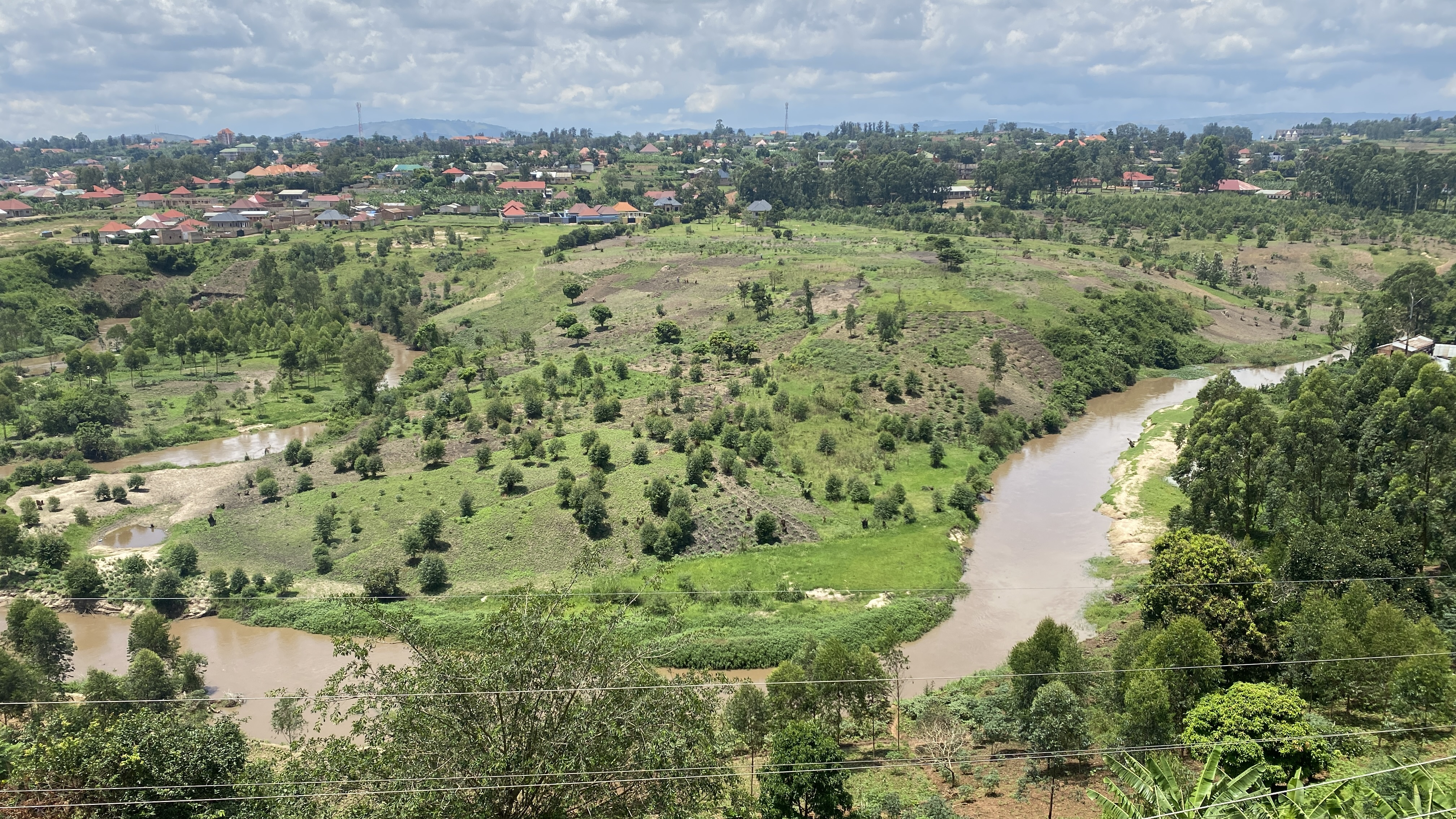
Vegetation and human activity around River Rwizi in Mbarara

River Rwizi

River Rwizi supplies both domestic and commercial water to Mbarara town. The river is also an important ecosystem and acts as a tourist site for safari tourists on their way to and from the south western part of Uganda.

== Community health ==
In Uganda, Mbarara district has consistently been rated among the top 20 districts in the improvement of community health. The district has attained a penta vaccine coverage of 86.4%, 66% deliveries of pregnant mothers in health units, a 1.3% out-patient department (OPD) per capita utilization, and a comprehensive HIV/AIDS service coverage of 85% with a prevalence rate of 7%, sanitation coverage of 97% and reduction in sanitation related diseases occurrence by 40%.

== Notable people ==
- Olive Kigongo, businesswoman

== See also ==
- Mbarara
- Mbarara University
- Uganda Districts
- Western Uganda
- Ankole Kingdom
- BSU
