= Bugongi, Sheema, Uganda =

Town in Western Uganda

Bugongi
- Location in Uganda
- Coordinates: 00°38′08″S 30°15′10″E
- Country: Uganda
- Region: Western Uganda
- Sub-region: Ankole sub-region
- District: Sheema District
- Elevation: 1,545 m (5,069 ft)

Population (2014 Census)
  - Total: 11,547
  - Density: 318/km^{2} (820/sq mi)

Bugongi is a town in the Western Region of Uganda. It is an urban center in Sheema District.

== Location ==
The town is located long the Kabwohe–Kitagata Road, approximately 17 kilometres (11 mi), by road, southwest of Sheema Municipality, where the district headquartered are located. This is approximately 13 kilometres (8 mi), by road, northeast of Kitagata. The coordinates of the town are: 0°38'08.0"S, 30°15'10.0"E (Latitude:-0.635556; Longitude:30.252778). Bugongi is located at an average elevation of 1,545 metres (5,069 ft), above sea level.

== Overview ==
Bugongi Town Council measures 36.3 square kilometres (14.0 mi^{2}) or (9,000 acres). It lies along a 30 kilometres (19 mi), dirt road that connects the Mbarara–Ishaka Road to the Ishaka–Kagamba Road. Uganda's president, Yoweri Museveni, has on more than one occasion, promised to tarmac the road that passes through Bugongi and serves as its main street.

== Population ==
As of August 2014, the national census and household survey, enumerated the total population of Bugongi Town Council to be 11,547 people, of whom 5,995 (51.9%) were female and 5,552 (48.1%) were male. At that time, the population density in the town was 318/km2 (820/sq mi).

== Health ==
Bugongi Health Center III is the main public healthcare facility in the town. However, due to the dilapidated nature of the infrastructure, the services offered are below standards and many in the community seek services elsewhere.

== Finance ==
Bugongi is home to Bugongi Savings and Community Cooperative Organization (Bugongi SACCO), a farmers community cooperative. As of June 2010, Bugongi SACCO had 2,257 members, with USh330 million in share capital (US$132,000), USh220 million (US$88,000) in savings and a loan portfolio of USh626 million (US$250,400).

- Note: In June 2010, US$1.00 = USh2,500

== See also ==
- Sheema Municipality
- List of roads in Uganda
