= Naome Kibaaju =

Ugandan politician (born 1950)

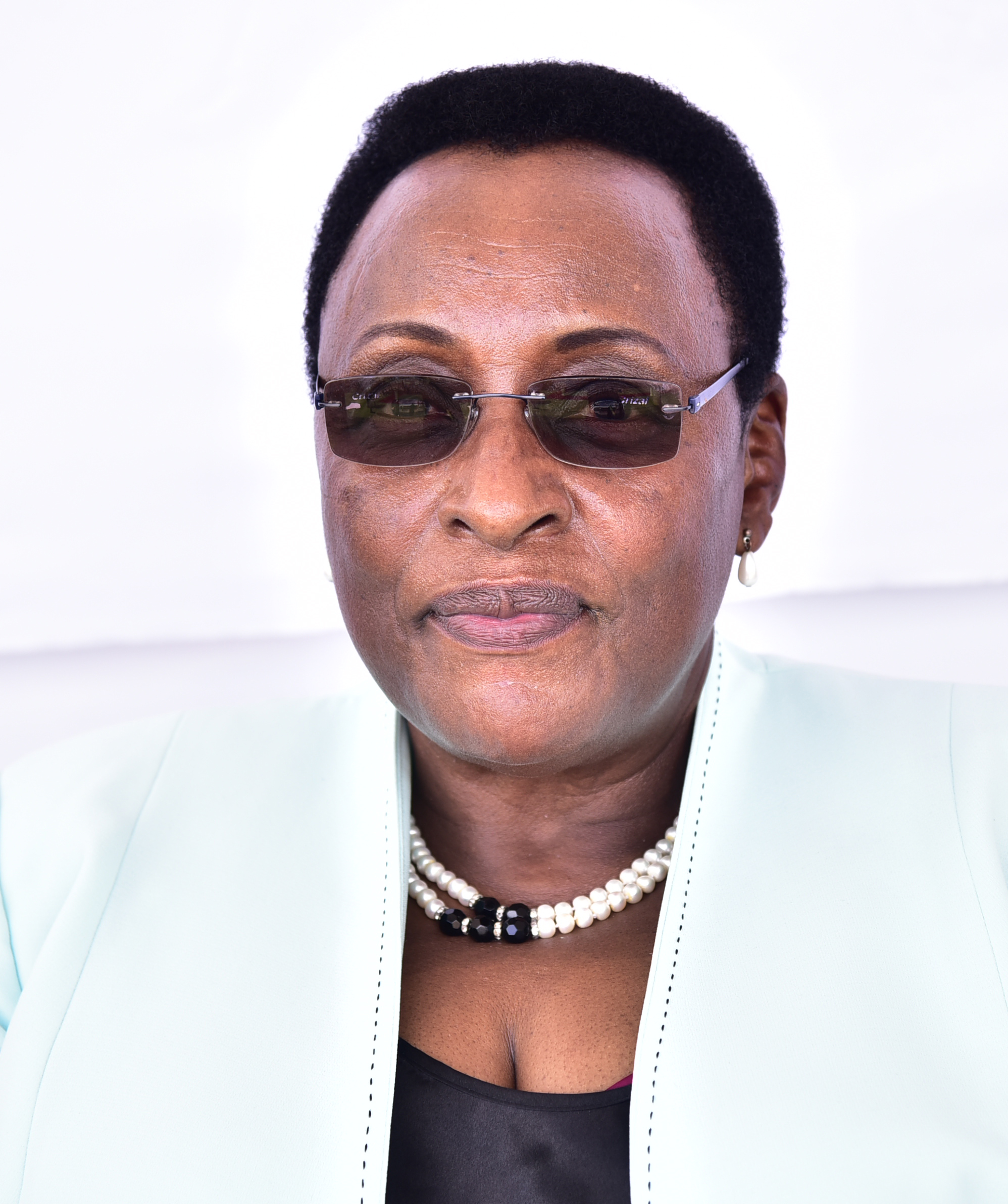
- Born: 1 June 1950 (age 76); Sheema, Uganda
- Education: Bweranyangi Girls' Senior Secondary School (High School Diploma); Makerere University (Bachelor of Arts in Political Science & Social Administration) (Diploma in Public Administration) (Master of Arts in Gender Studies and Development)
- Occupation: Politician
- Years active: 1975 to present
- Title: Member of Parliament for Sheema County North Constituency

Naome Kibaaju (born 1 June 1950) is a Ugandan management personnel and a politician in the 11th Parliament of Uganda. She is the woman member of parliament of Sheema County North, Sheema District. She belongs to the ruling National Resistance Movement (NRM) political party.

== Early life and education ==
Naome was born on 1 June 1950. In 1962, she completed her Primary Leaving Examinations at Bweranyangi Girls Primary School. In 1969, she sat for Uganda Certificate of Education at Bweranyangi Girls' Senior Secondary School. In 1970, Naome attained the Uganda Advanced Certificate of Education at Trinity College Nabbingo. She later joined Makerere University and graduated with Bachelor of Arts in Political Science and Social Administration in 1974. In 1978, Naome went back to Makerere University for Diploma in Public Administration. In 1998, she graduated with Master of Arts in Gender and Development from Makerere University.

== Career ==
=== Beginnings ===
Between 1998 and 1999, Naome served as the board member of Uganda Women's Efforts to Save Orphans (UK Chapter). She worked as the Assistant Secretary at the Office of the President from 1975 to 1980. In 1980–1990, she worked as the Senior Assistant Secretary at the Office of the Prime Minister. In 1991–1996, she was employed as the Principal Assistant Secretary at the Ministry of Finance, Planning and Economic Development. Between 1997 and 1998, she worked as the under secretary at the Education Service Commission.In 1998–2000, she served as the board member of Ankole Western University. In the period of 1999–2000, she was the Vice Lady Captain of Uganda Golf Club. Between 1999 and 2010, she was the Under secretary at Ministry of Defence. In 2012–2016, she served as the board member of National Enterprise Corporation. From 2016 to date, she is the board member of National Medical Stores. From 2017 to date, she sits on the board membership of Uganda Micro Finance Regulatory Authority.

=== Political career ===
From 2018 to date, Naome is a member of the parliament of Uganda. She was elected to the parliament after beating Guma Nuwagaba who belonged to the opposition Forum for Democratic Change (FDC) party with 11,326 against 7,322 votes. The Sheema North Parliamentary seat fell vacant when the then area MP, Elioda Tumwesigye resigned in August after being elected the MP for the newly created Sheema Municipality. On 6 November 2018, she took her oath administered by the Deputy Speaker of Parliament, Jacob Oulanyah. She was then handed a copy of the Constitution and the Parliament Rules of Procedure by Oulanyah.

Naome Kibaaju beat Guma Nuwagaba by a little over 4,000 votes to win the Sheema North constituency by-election. The total number of valid votes cast was 18, 648 while the invalid votes were 125 with twenty-eight (28) ballot papers spoilt. The county had a total of 65 polling stations. She was described by NRM chairman President Yoweri Museveni as an honest and trusted person who worked in defense for many years before joining politics.

Three people were nominated to contest for the Sheema North parliamentary seat ahead of the 8 October election. The three people included; Naome Kibaaju who was nominated on the NRM ticket, Guma Nuwagaba was nominated on the FDC ticket after defecting from NRM and Felix Mujuni was accepted to contest as an Independent political party.

== Personal life ==
She was a married woman.

== See also ==
- Uganda Microfinance Regulatory Authority
- Uganda National Medical stores
- Sheema District
- List of members of the tenth Parliament of Uganda
- Parliament of Uganda
- Elioda Tumwesigye
- Ephraim Kamuntu
- Jacklet Atuhaire
- List of members of the eleventh Parliament of Uganda
