= Ishaka Adventist Hospital =

Private hospital in Uganda

- Location within Uganda

Geography
- Location: Ishaka, Bushenyi District, Western Region, Uganda
- Coordinates: 00°32′38″S 30°08′17″E

Organisation
- Care system: Private
- Type: General

Services
- Beds: 120

History
- Founded: 1950

Links
- Website: http://iah.co.ug/
- Other links: Hospitals in Uganda

Ishaka Adventist Hospital is a rural hospital in Uganda. The hospital is located in the town of Ishaka, Bushenyi District, Western Uganda. It is located immediately north of the junction where the Ishaka–Kagamba Road meets the Mbarara–Ishaka Road. It is approximately 61 kilometres (38 mi) west of Mbarara, the largest city in the sub-region. This location lies approximately 329 kilometres (204 mi), by road, southwest of Kampala, the capital of Uganda and the largest city in that country. The geographical coordinates of Ishaka Adventist Hospital are: 0°32'38.0"S, 30°08'17.0"E (Latitude:-0.543889; Longitude:30.138056).

== Overview ==
Ishaka Adventist is a 120-bed hospital. It primarily serves the poor from the rural districts of Bushenyi, Sheema, Rubirizi, Mitooma, Buhweju, Kasese and Ntungamo.

The hospital, which began offering patient services in 1950, has the following departments: 1. Male Ward 2. Female Ward 3. Maternity Ward 4. Maternal & Child Health Services 5. Radiology Services 6. Dental Care Services 7. Lifestyle and Wellness Centre 8. Laboratory Services 9. Chaplaincy Department and 10. HIV Clinic.

Ishaka Adventist Hospital has two affiliated medical training institutions on its property: 1. Ishaka Adventist School of Allied Health Sciences and 2. Ishaka Adventist School of Nursing and Midwifery. The hospital also owns and administers the Ishaka Adventist Health Plan.

In September 2020, Ishaka Adventist hospital with support from UPMB implemented Stre@mline Health, an EMR for Africa that enables clinicians in resource poor settings to deliver health care efficiently by providing key patient safety prompts across the entire patient journey.

== History ==
Ishaka Adventist Hospital was founded in 1950. The mission hospital is operated by the Seventh-day Adventist Church and the majority of te people it takes care of are rural subsistence farmers.

== Ebola threat ==
In 2000 Ishaka Adventist Hospital was on high alert after the Ebolavirus was reported in Mbarara District, 60 kilometres (37 mi) from the hospital. A nurse from the hospital was sent to a larger hospital for training in isolation and treatment procedures for the virus.

== Corporal punishment controversy ==
At Ishaka Adventist School of Nursing and Midwifery, two students who left their dormitory without permission were suspended, by the Deputy Princil of the school. When the suspended students returned to school, the parents were told to whip their children as punishment. The Senior Administrator of Ishaka Adventist Hospital, Lydia Komigisha told the Permanent Secretary Ministry of Education and Sports, who were investigating the spanking of the students. That she was embarrassed of the pictures on the internet. She said that it wasn't the schools policy to use corporal punishment. Lydia Komigisha later suspended the Deputy Principal and the Clinical Instructor, for their actions.

== See also ==
- List of hospitals in Uganda
- List of Seventh-day Adventist hospitals
