= Kitagata, Uganda =

Kitagata

- Location in Uganda
- Coordinates: 00°40′21″S 30°09′18″E
- Country: Uganda
- Region: Western Uganda
- Sub-region: Ankole sub-region
- District: Sheema District
- Elevation: 4,660 ft (1,420 m)

Kitagata is a town in Western Uganda. It is one of the urban centers in Sheema District.

== Location ==
Kitagata is located in Sheema County South, Sheema District, in Western Uganda. The town lies on the Ishaka–Kagamba Road, approximately 17 kilometres (11 mi), south of Ishaka, Bushenyi District, the nearest large town. This lies approximately 62 kilometres (39 mi), southwest of Mbarara, Mbarara District, the largest city in the sub-region. The coordinates of Kitagata are:0° 40' 21.00"S, 30° 9' 18.00"E (Latitude:-0.672499; Longitude:30.154991).

== Points of interest ==
- The offices of Kitagata Town Council
- Kitagata Central Market
- The Ishaka-Kagamba Road - The highway passes through the center of the town in a north-south direction.
- Kitagata General Hospital - A public 120-bed hospital administered by the Uganda Ministry of Health, located on the Kitagata-Rukungiri Road, just west of the center of the town.
- Kitagata Secondary School - A public, mixed, non-residential secondary school (S1 - S6)
- Kitagata Hot Springs - Located approximately 1 kilometre (0.62 mi) from the town center. They are two adjacent hot springs; Ekyomugabe and Mulago, with water temperatures as hot as 80 °C (176 °F)

== Kitagata bubaare village ==
- Sheema District
- Ankole sub-region
- Western Region, Uganda
