= Kitagata Hot Springs =

- Location in Uganda
- Coordinates: 00°40′42″S 30°09′38″E
- Country: Uganda
- Region: Western Region
- District: Sheema District

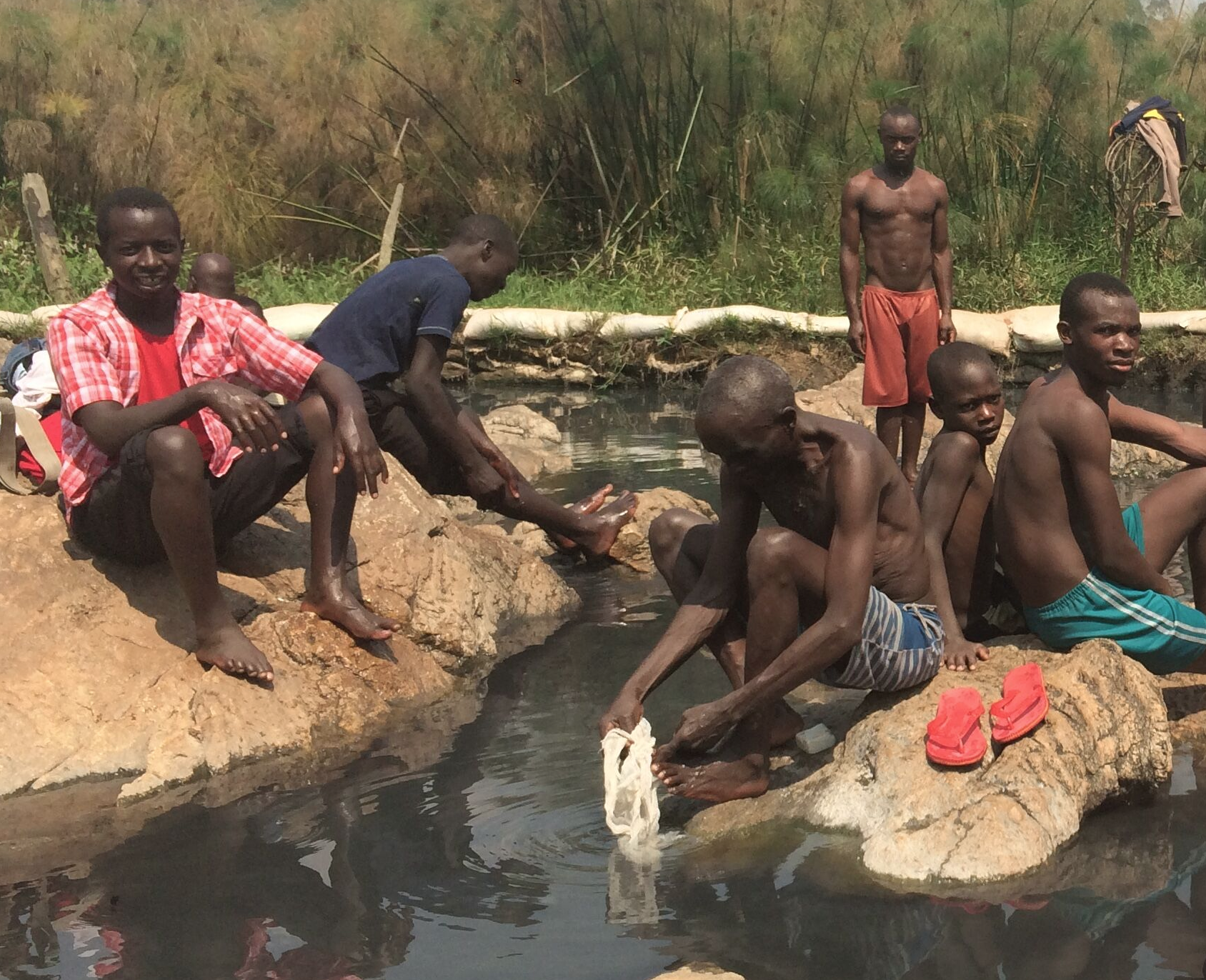
Kitagata Hot Springs

Kitagata Hot Springs are natural hot springs in the Western Region of Uganda. The springs are said to have natural healing powers.

== Location ==
The hot springs are located on the Ishaka–Kagamba Road, in Sheema County, in Sheema District, Western Uganda, approximately 2 kilometres (1.2 mi) by road southeast of the town of Kitagata, one of the urban centers in the district, and approximately 62 kilometres (39 mi) by road west of Mbarara, the largest city in the sub-region. The co-ordinates of Kitagata Hot Springs are 0°40'42.0"S, 30°09'38.0"E (Latitude:-0.678346; Longitude:30.160556).

== Overview ==
There are two hot springs adjacent to each other. According to the locals, one of the springs was used by the former Omugabe (King of Ankole) and is known as Ekyomugabe. The other spring is believed to have healing powers and is known as Mulago, after Uganda's largest National Referral Hospital. Some locals drink the water.

Semi-naked men and women bathe in the warm waters of Kitagata Mulago, the spring believed to possess healing powers, sometimes as many as 200 in a day. The water in the springs can warm up to 80 °C (176 °F).

The road to this place is marrum and is located near a large swamp. The scenery is breath-taking with conical hills and inselbergs characterized with beautiful green vegetation of trees and grass. During the rainy season, the River Ngaromwenda which supplies water to the springs, floods and causes the Kitagata springs to be warm rather than hot.

== Concern ==
Residents of Kitagata are concerned that the construction of the nearby Kagamba-Ishaka Road may harm the hot springs by exposing them to flooding.

== See also ==
- Ihimba Hot Springs
- Kitagata, Uganda
- Sheema District
- Ankole sub-region
- Western Region, Uganda
