= Kitagata General Hospital =

- Uganda Ministry of Health
- Location within Uganda

Geography
- Location: Kitagata, Sheema District, Western Region, Uganda
- Coordinates: 00°40′21″S 30°09′04″E

Organisation
- Care system: Public
- Type: General

Services
- Emergency department: I
- Beds: 100

History
- Founded: 1969

Links
- Other links: Hospitals in Uganda

Kitagata General Hospital, also Kitagata Hospital, is a hospital in the Western Region of Uganda.

== Location ==
The hospital is located in the central business district of the town of Kitagata, in Sheema District, in the Ankole sub-region, in Western Uganda, about 62 kilometres (39 mi) southwest of Mbarara Regional Referral Hospital. This is about 111 kilometres (69 mi) north of Kabale Regional Referral Hospital. The coordinates of Kitagata General Hospital are: 0°40'21.0"S, 30°09'04.0"E (Latitude:-0.672503; Longitude:30.151111).

== Overview ==
Kitagata Hospital was established in 1969 by the first government of Prime Minister Milton Obote. It has a bed capacity of 100. As with many government hospitals built at the same time, the hospital infrastructure is in a dilapidated state, with antiquated equipment.

== Recent developments ==
In 2013, the government of Uganda acquired funds to renovate certain hospitals, including Kitagata General Hospital, using funds borrowed from the World Bank.

== See also ==
- List of hospitals in Uganda
