= Valley University of Science and Technology =

Private Chartered university in Uganda

- Motto: Education for Self-Reliance
- Type: Private
- Established: 2016
- Chancellor: James Musinguzi Garuga
- Vice-Chancellor: Dr. Enos Rwasheema
- Students: 3,000+ (2025)
- Location: Bushenyi, Uganda; 00°32′54″S 30°12′04″E
- Website: Homepage
- Location within Uganda

Valley University of Science and Technology (VUST), is a private Chartered university in Uganda. In October 2015, the proprietors of the university received accreditation from the Uganda National Council for Higher Education, to start the institution. On 3rd of July 2025, VUST was granted a Charter by the government of Uganda.

== Location ==
The university campus is located in the town of Bushenyi, adjacent to Valley College, off of the Mbarara-Ishaka Highway, approximately 54 kilometres (34 mi), by road, west of Mbarara, the largest city in the Western Region of Uganda. The geographical coordinates of the university campus are: 0°32'54.0"S, 30°12'04.0"E (Latitude:-0.548333; Longitude:30.201111).

== Overview ==
VUST is an institutional of higher learning that received accreditation in October 2015 to begin with two faculties. The university is wholly owned by an entity known as Mukaira Foundation Limited (MFL). MFL also owns and operates Valley College, a mixed residential secondary school, and Valley Wines Limited, a wine-growing and processing business. MFL is majority owned by businessman and retired educator, William Mukaira (born 1929)

The university aims to provide science and technology courses applicable to the rural environment, in a rural setting, with a view to improve the living conditions of the rural communities in the areas that the university serves.

== Academics ==
The university has three faculties: (a) Faculty of Science, Technology & Innovations and (b) Faculty of Business and Management Science and (c)Faculty of Education.It also has a Directorate of Postgraduate Studies

=== Courses ===
Faculty of Science, Technology & Innovations

- Bachelor of Agribusiness Management and Rural Development
- Bachelor of Science In Agriculture
- Bachelor of Information Technology
- Diploma in Agribusiness and Rural Development
- Diploma in Information Technology
- National Certificate in Information Technology
- National Certificate in Secretarial and Information Management
- National Certificate in Agriculture Production
- National Certificate in Computer Science and Technology
- National Certificate in Computer Applications
- National Certificate in Library Information Science

Faculty of Education

- Master's degree in Education Management Science and Leadership
- Postgraduate Diploma in Education Management Science and Leadership
- Bachelor of Science with Education
- Bachelor of Arts with Education
- Bachelor of Science in Guidance and Counseling
- Bachelor of Education (Secondary) (In-service)
- Bachelor of Education (Primary) (In-service)
- Bachelor of Early Childhood Education(In-service)
- Diploma in Early childhood Education (In-service)
- Diploma in Primary Education (In-service)

Faculty of Business and Management Science

- Master of Business Administration
- Master of Public Administration
- Postgraduate Diploma in Public Administration
- Postgraduate Diploma in Business Administration
- Bachelor of Business Administration
- Bachelor of Office Management and Secretarial Studies
- Bachelor of Public Administration
- Bachelor of Procurement and Logistics
- Diploma in Business Administration
- Diploma in Public Administration

== See also ==
- List of universities in Uganda
- Education in Uganda
