= Itega =

- Map of Uganda showing the location of Itega.
- Coordinates: 00°36′46.2″S 30°15′35.7″E
- Country: Uganda
- District: Bushenyi District

Government
  - Village Chairman (LC1): Kenneth kakuba
- Elevation: 1,120 m (3,670 ft)
- Time zone: UTC+3 (EAT)

Itega is a settlement in Bushenyi District, in Uganda's Western Region.

== Location ==
Itega village lies in Kitagata Parish, Kyeizooba Sub-county, Bushenyi District, approximately 275.36 kilometres (171 mi), south west of Kampala, Uganda's capital city.

Itega is bordered by Rwenyena to the north, Kabuba to the east, Kibaniga to the south and Kasheshe to the west. Its geographical coordinates are:0°36'46.2"S, 30°15'35.7"E (Latitude:-0.612833; Longitude:30.259917).

== Overview ==
Itega Village has been known for its resident's talent in music dance and drama, it won various mothers Union competitions and won matches among various communities in Kyeizooba.

There has been a long standing union between Itega and other communities like Itekashe solidarity.

== Points of interest ==
The following points of interest are found in Itega or near its boundaries:

- Kabuba Church of Uganda
- Itega communal gathering (Ekitehurizi)
- Kabuba Primary School
- Rwentuha Bugongi Road connects Bushenyi to Parts of Sheema District

== Key people ==
- Muhirwe Julius (Kachuru) deceased
- Jadress Kagamba
- Tereza Kyamutwe deceased
- Kariisa Godfrey
- Bisiima
- Erivaida Bagyerera

== See also ==
- Bushenyi
- Uganda
