= Elijah Mushemeza =

Ugandan politician

Elijah Dickens Mushemeza
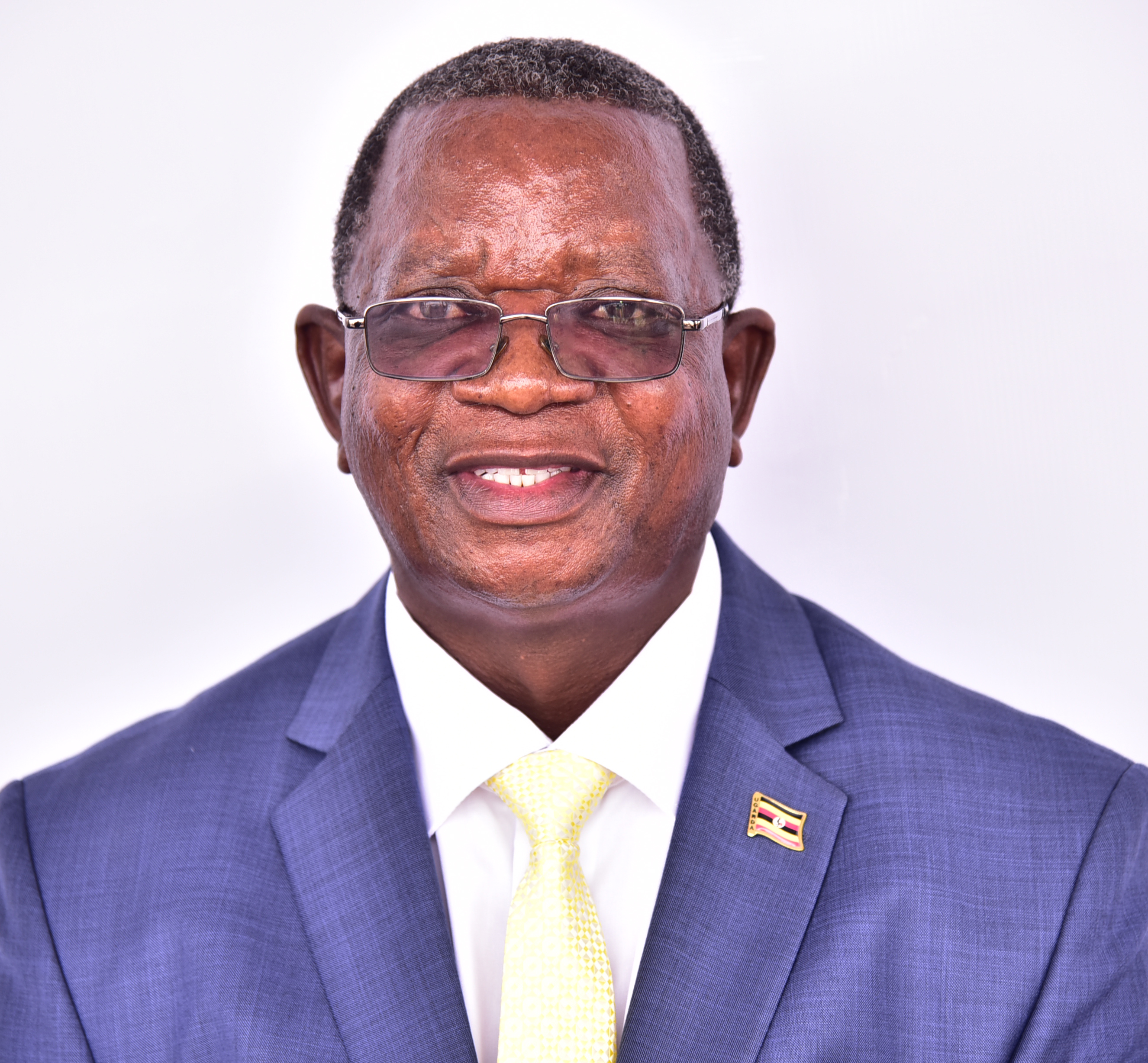
- Born: 26 February 1964 (age 62); Uganda
- Citizenship: Uganda
- Education: Bachelor of Arts, Makerere University; Master of Arts, Institute of Social Studies - The Hague; Doctor Philosophy, Makerere University
- Occupation: Academic
- Years active: since 1987
- Known for: Academia, politics

Elijah Dickens Mushemeza (born 26 February 1964, in the Sheema District, Western Region of Uganda) is an academic, an author, and a practical politician.

He is a professor of political science and Development Management at Ankole Western University and a senior consultant at Advocates Coalition for Development and Environment (ACODE). Previously, he was the dean of Faculty of Business and Development Studies at Bishop Stuart University, Mbarara, Uganda. He is a visiting professor at Bishop Stuart University.

In the 2026 general elections, Elijah Dickens Mushemeza contested for the seat of Member of Parliament for Sheema South Constituency as an independent candidate but was defeated by NRM's Prof. Ephraim Kamuntu.

== Education ==
He earned a Bachelor of Arts degree in social sciences, a Master of Arts (MA) degree in development studies, and a Doctor of Philosophy degree in political science at Makerere University. He is a consultant on education, governance, poverty, politics, conflict, forced migration, security, oil and gas, and development issues generally in the Great Lakes region of Africa.

== Professional background ==
He was previously a coordinator of the MA programme in international relations and diplomatic studies in the Department of Political Science and Public Administration, Makerere University. He has taught at the Mbarara University of Science and Technology. Mushemeza is a past alternate executive committee member of the Council for the Development of Social Science Research in Africa. He has published widely in international journals. He is the editor of the Journal of Development Issues. Outside academia, Mushemeza is active in Ugandan politics. He was a member of the Constituent Assembly (1994-95 that debated, scrutinized, enacted, and promulgated the Constitution of Uganda, and a Member of Parliament of Uganda in 1996. He was a presidential advisor at the level of a senior Cabinet minister and the vice-chairperson of the Electoral Commission of the National Resistance Movement, the ruling party in Uganda (2010–2015).

== Publications ==
In his book, The Politics and Empowerment of Banyarwanda Refugees in Uganda, 1959–2001, Mushemeza explores how Banyarwanda refugees achieved reasonable levels of integration in Ugandan society because of demographic, social, economic, and cultural characteristics similar to that of the Ugandan population in the areas where they settled. If the Ugandan state had not "failed" in the late 1970s and 1980s, these refugees would perhaps have been naturalised. Although almost all the Hutu and the Tutsi refugees achieved meaningful levels of integration (as some were treated badly and abused with derogatory language), their leaders and some of the elites never gave up the dream of returning home. The opportunity to return eventually emerged in the context of civil war in Uganda (1981–86). Banyarwanda refugees joined the NRM/NRA struggle that enabled them to acquire political, diplomatic, and military skills, which they used effectively to achieve their empowerment ambitions.

Mushemeza has published widely in local and international journals, including CODESRIA, ACODE and CEWIGO. He is also the Edetor of the Journal of Development Issues.

== Political career ==
He lost his MP seat to Ephraim Kamuntu, who gathered 15,337 votes and him polling 10,417 votes.

== Other experience ==
Outside university, Mushemeza is active in Ugandan politics. He was a member of the Constituent Assembly (1994–95) that debated, scrutinised, enacted and promulgated the Constitution of Uganda, and a member of the Parliament of Uganda in 1996. He was formerly thevice-cChairperson of the Electoral Commission of the National ResistanceMovementt, the ruling party in Uganda.

== Personal life ==
Elijah Mushemeza has been married to Irene Mushemeza since 1994. They are the parents of five children.
