= Kibingo, Uganda =

Kibingo
- Location in Uganda
- Coordinates: 00°34′12″S 30°24′54″E
- Country: Uganda
- Regions of Uganda: Western Uganda
- Sub-region: Ankole sub-region
- District: Sheema District
- Elevation: 4,900 ft (1,500 m)

Kibingo is a town in Western Uganda and serves as the administrative headquarters of Sheema District.

== Location ==
Kibingo is located on the main Mbarara-Bushenyi Road, approximately 31 kilometres (19 mi) west of Mbarara, the largest city in the Ankole sub-region. It is approximately 295 kilometres (183 mi), by road, southwest of Kampala, Uganda's capital and largest city. The coordinates of the town are:0°34'12.0"S, 30°24'54.0"E (Latitude:-0.5700; Longitude:30.4150).

== Overview ==
Kibingo is one of the towns in Sheema District, the others being:

- Kabwohe
- Sheema
- Kamushoko
- Mushanga

== Points of interest ==
The following points of interest lie within or close to the town limits:

- The headquarters of Sheema District Administration
- The offices of Kibingo Town Council
- Kibingo Central Market
- The Mbarara-Bushenyi Highway - The highway passes through the town in an east to west direction.

== See also ==
- Sheema District
- Ankole sub-region
- Western Region, Uganda
- Ugandan Towns
