= Ihimba Hot Springs =

Thermal springs in Uganda

- Location: Kabale District, Western Region, Uganda

Ihimba Hot Springs are geothermal hot springs located in Kabale District in the Western Region of Uganda, within the vicinity of Bwindi impenetrable National Park. They lie along the Kabale–Katuna road, about 8 kilometres south of Kabale Town, and sit within a eucalyptus forest landscape.

== Location ==
The springs are in south-western Uganda in Kabale District, close to the boarder region shared with Rwanda and the Democratic Republic of the Congo along the Kabale–Katuna road. They are described as being about 8 kilometres from Kabale town center. The springs are surrounded by eucalyptus vegetation and lie within a landscape influenced by the Albertine Rift, an area characterised by geothermal activity.

== Geology ==
The springs form part of geothermal features linked to the Albertine Rift system. The Geoheritage study describes hot-spring formation in the region through hydrothermal circulation: meteoric water infiltrates fractures and faults, heats at depth, then rises to the surface. Hot springs form when under groundwater percolates deep into the Earths crust and is heated by geothermal energy before resurfacing. At Ihimba, water is heated by geothermal gradients within subsurface rocks and is forced back to the surface under pressure through cracks in the Earth's crust. The area is considered non-volcanic, with heat derived from deep rock formations rather than active volcanism.

== Physical characteristics ==
Water emerging from the Ihimba Hot Springs is reported to reach temperatures of up to approximately 63 degrees Celsius, making direct immersion unsafe in some sections. The springs emit visible steam and bubbling water at the surface.

The waters contain naturally occurring dissolved minerals, including:

- Sodium chloride
- Potassium chloride
- Calcium phosphate
- Lithium sulfate

== Cultural significance and use ==
The Ihimba Hot Springs hold cultural importance for several communities in the region, including the Bakiga, Bahima, Bafumbira, Banyankole and Banyarwanda. Traditionally, the springs have been associated with spiritual beliefs and indigenous healing practices. Local traditions hold that waters possess therapeutic properties, and some visitors historically used the springs to relieve ailments such as back pain and rheumatism. These beliefs are cultural traditions and are not scientifically verified.

Pregnant women have also traditionally visited the springs based on beliefs that the waters could ease childbirth.

== Tourism ==
The springs are listed among hot-spring geosites with geoheritage and geotourism value in Uganda’s Albertine Region. Kabale District Local Government presents the site as a local attraction accessed from the Kabale–Katuna road.

Ihimba Hot Springs are a popular stop on Uganda wildlife tours. Visitors often combine their trip with cultural experiences among the Bahima people, known for their rich traditions and craftsmanship. The springs are also near several national parks, including:

- Mgahinga National Park, home of endangered mountain gorillas and golden monkeys.
- Semuliki National Park, known for its biodiversity and geothermal features like Sempaya Hot Springs.
- Queen Elizabeth National Park, Offering sightings of elephants, tree climbing lions, zebras, Ugandan kobs and over 500 bird spicies.
- Bwindi Impenetrable National Park, known for mountain gorilla trekking
- Lake Bunyonyi, a mojor freshwater lake popular for recreation

== Bird watching ==
The area around Ihimba Hot Springs is notable for bird watching, with species such as the Verreaux's eagle, African fish eagle, bare-faced go-away bird, barbets, and sunbirds commonly known observed. Uganda is recognized for its avian diversity, and Queen Elizabeth National Park is one of the country's premier birding destinations.

== See also ==
- Kitagata Hot Springs
- List of hot springs
- Kabale District
- Queen Elizabeth National Park
- Semuliki National Park
- Bwindi Impenetrable National Park
