= Ephraim Kamuntu =

Ugandan politician & scientist

Minister of Internal Affairs
- Incumbent
- Assumed office 26 May 2026
- President: Yoweri Museveni

Member of Parliament for Sheema County South
- Incumbent
- Assumed office 13 May 2026
- Preceded by: Elijah Dickens Mushemeza

Personal details
- Born: 26 September 1945 (age 81) Uganda
- Citizenship: Uganda
- Education: Makerere University (Bachelor of Arts in economics); University of Rochester (Master of Science in systems analysis); University of Massachusetts (Master of Arts in management & business administration)
- Occupation: Management, scientist, politician
- Known for: Politics

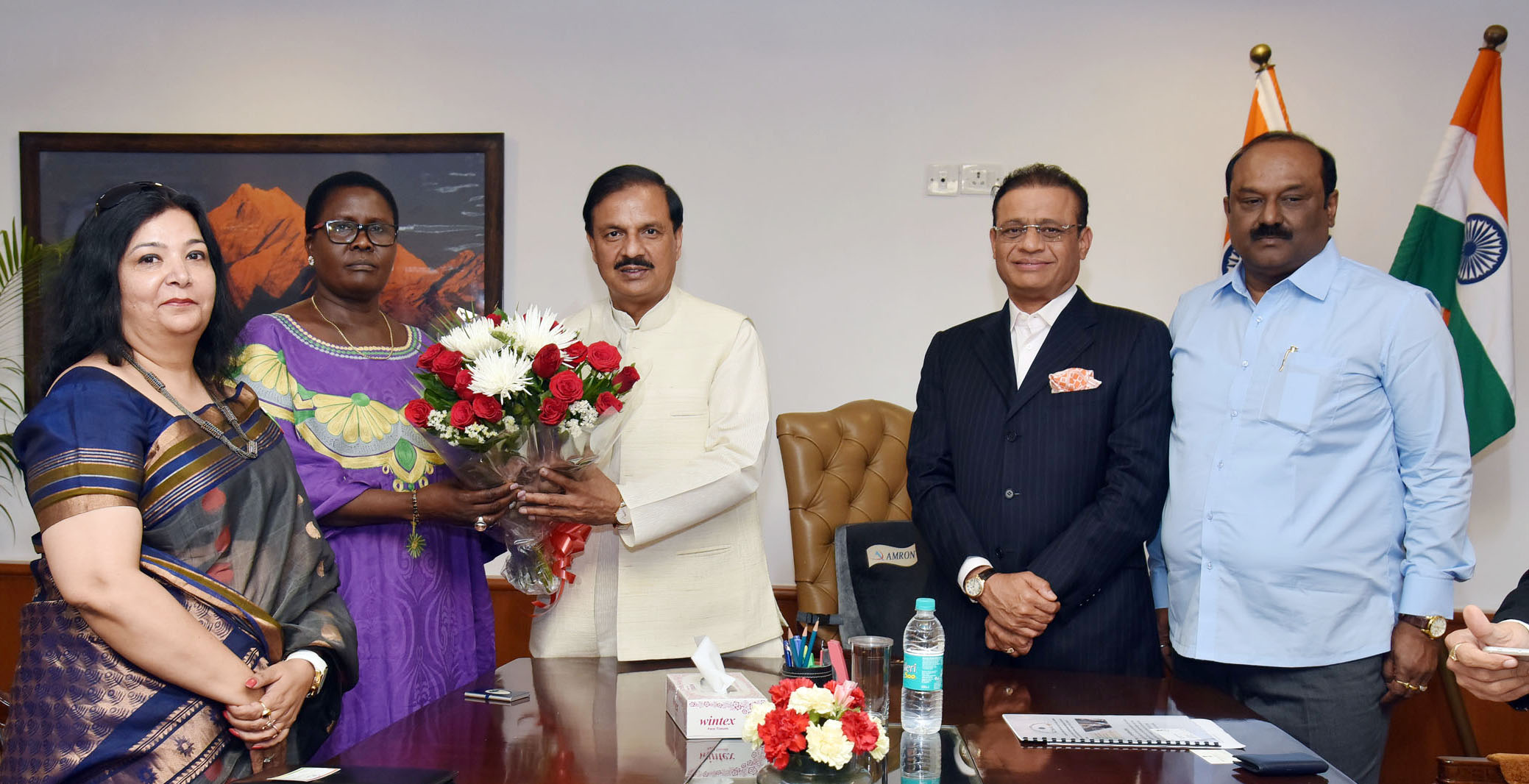
Prof.Ephraim Kamuntu meeting with Honorary Consul General of Uganda

Ephraim Kamuntu (born 26 September 1945) is a Ugandan management scientist, academic, and politician who serves as the Minister of Internal Affairs and the Member of Parliament for Sheema County South in the 12th Parliament. He has previously served as the Minister of Justice and Constitutional Affairs in the Cabinet of Uganda since 14 December 2019. He also served as Minister of Water and Environment from August 2012 to June 2016. He is also an ex-officio Member of the Parliament of Uganda because of his Cabinet position.

== Background and education ==
Ephraim Kamuntu was born in Sheema District on 26 September 1945. He attended Ntare School for both his O-Level (1962–1965) and his A-Level (1966–1967) education. He studied at Makerere University, Uganda's oldest university, graduating in 1971 with a Bachelor of Arts in economics, political science, and history. In 1973, he obtained a Master of Science in systems analysis from the University of Rochester, in New York State. He also earned a Master of Arts in management science and business administration, from the University of Massachusetts.

== Career ==
At some point after Idi Amin took power in Uganda in 1971, Kamuntu became part of the exile-based Save Uganda Movement, a militant group attempting to overthrow Amin. Kamuntu lectured at Nairobi University in 1978. He lectured in Makerere University's Faculty of Commerce before it was shifted to the current Makerere University Business School in Nakawa. From 1992 until 1995, Kamuntu served as the chairman and managing director of Nile Bank Limited, a private commercial bank in Uganda. Between 1995 and 1997, he worked as a private consultant. From 1997 until 2001, he served as the National Coordinator for the Private Sector Development Program of the Ugandan Government. He entered politics in 2001, contesting for the parliamentary seat of Sheema County South, Bushenyi District. He was elected and was re-elected in 2006.

On 1 June 2006, he was appointed Minister of State for Industry. On 16 February 2009, he was reassigned as State Minister of Finance for Planning. In the cabinet reshuffle of 27 May 2011, he was promoted to full cabinet minister and assigned the Ministry of Tourism, Wildlife and Heritage, serving in that position until he was appointed as Minister of Water and Environment on 15 August 2012. Kamuntu was made Minister of Tourism, Wildlife and Antiquities on 6 June 2016.

After losing his parliamentary seat in 2021, Kamuntu successfully reclaimed the National Resistance Movement (NRM) flag and won back the Sheema County South constituency during the 2026 general elections, officially taking his oath on 13 May 2026. Following his return to the 12th Parliament, President Yoweri Museveni reappointed him to the cabinet as the Minister of Internal Affairs on 26 May 2026, making him one of the senior-most members of the 2026–2031 cabinet.

== Personal details ==
Ephraim Kamuntu was married to Ida Kamuntu, who died in May 2015.
