= Pride Bank Limited =

Credit institution in Uganda

Coordinates: 00°20′41″N 32°35′40″E

- Company type: Parastatal
- Industry: Financial services
- Founded: 1995; 31 years ago
- Headquarters: Victoria Office Park; 6-9 Ben Kiwanuka Okot Close; Bukoto, Kampala, Uganda
- Key people: Fred Omach (Chairman); Veronicah Namagembe (Managing Director); Edward Nkangi (Executive Director)
- Products: Loans, savings
- Revenue: ▲Aftertax:UGX:7,687,853,000 ($2.12 million) (2023)
- Total assets: UGX:455,557,125,000 (US$125.56 million) (2023)
- Number of employees: 1,585+ (2013)
- Website: www.pridebank.co.ug

Pride Bank Limited, is a Tier II credit institution in Uganda. It is licensed by the Bank of Uganda, the central bank and national banking regulator.

== Overview ==
As of December 2023, the institution's total assets were valued at UGX:455,557,125,000 (approx. US$125.56 million), with shareholders' equity of UGX:168,557,125,000 (US$46.46 million). During the 12 months ending 31 December 2023, the institution made an after-tax profit of UGX:7,687,853,000 (approx. $2.12 million).

== History ==
The institution was founded in 1995 as Pride Microfinance Limited (PMFL) a non-governmental organization with the support of the Norwegian Agency for Development Cooperation. Its major objective was to offer credit to the poor, targeting those in the agricultural sector. In 1999, it was incorporated as a limited company and changed its name to Pride Africa Uganda Limited. The institution provides financial services to that segment of the Ugandan population who are not served or are unable to access financial services through Ugandan commercial banks. PBL's focus are the micro, small, and medium size entrepreneurs. It is therefore prohibited from dealing in foreign exchange. In 2003, the Uganda government acquired 100 percent shareholding in the enterprise, changing the name to Pride Microfinance Limited Uganda. In 2005, it attained the status of a Tier III (an MDI), according to the Banking Act of 2003.

In February 2016, Ugandan media reported that the government was planning to merge PMFL with PostBank Uganda, to form an agricultural bank.

== Developments ==
On 29 April 2025, Pride Microfinance officially rebranded to Pride Bank Limited, a Tier II credit institution, following appropriate licensing by the Bank of Uganda on 26 November 2024. Fred Jachan Omach was introduced as the new chairman of Pride Bank. Edward Nkangi was introduced as the new executive director of the bank. At that time the bank's core capital was reported as UGX174 billion (US$47.78 million).

== Branch network ==
The entire branch network of the company included the following locations, as of June 2014:

1. Arua Branch - Avenue Road, Arua
2. Bugiri Branch - Mivule Road, Bugiri
3. Bukoto Branch - Victoria Office Park, 6-9 Ben Kiwanuka Okot Close, Bukoto, Kampala Main Branch
4. Bushenyi Branch - High Street, Bushenyi
5. Buwenge Branch - Kamuli Road, Buwenge
6. Kampala City Branch - Mukwano Arcade, Kampala
7. Fort Portal Branch - Rukidi Road, Fort Portal
8. Gulu Branch - Cemetery Road, Gulu
9. Entebbe Road Branch - Metropole House, Entebbe Road, Kampala
10. Hoima Branch - Old Tororo Road, Hoima
11. Ibanda Branch - High Street, Ibanda
12. Iganga Branch - Main Street, Iganga
13. Ishaka Branch - Rukungiri Road, Ishaka
14. Jinja Branch - Main Street, Jinja
15. Kabalagala Branch - Muyenga Road, Kabalagala
16. Kabale Branch - Kabale Road, Kabale
17. Kabingo Branch - Kabingo Trading Center, Isingiro District
18. Kabwohe Branch - Mbarara Road, Kabwohe
19. Kagadi Branch - High Street, Kagadi
20. Kasese Branch - Saad Building, Kasese
21. Katwe Branch - Katwe Road, Katwe
22. Kawempe Branch - Bombo Road, Kawempe
23. Lira Branch - Oboe Avenue, Lira
24. Lugazi Branch - Ntenga Road, Lugazi
25. Masaka Branch - Kampala Road, Masaka
26. Mbale Branch - Republic Street, Mbale
27. Mbarara Branch - High Street, Mbarara
28. Mukono Branch - Kampala-Jinja Highway, Mukono
29. Nakawa Branch - UMA Show Ground, Nakawa
30. Naakulabye Branch - Hoima Road, Basiriak Building, Naakulabye
31. Nateete Branch - Masaka Road, Nateete
32. Pader Branch - Main Street, Pader
33. Rukungiri Branch - Rukungiri Road, Rukungiri
34. Soroti Branch - Solot Avenue, Soroti
35. Wandegeya Branch - Bombo-Gayaza Roundabout, Wandegeya

== See also ==
- Banking in Uganda
- List of banks in Uganda
- FINCA Uganda Limited
- Finance Trust Bank
