= Nsiika, Uganda =

Nsiika
- Location in Uganda
- Coordinates: 00°17′45″S 30°20′36″E
- Country: Uganda
- Region: Western Uganda
- District: Buhweju District
- Elevation: 5,200 ft (1,600 m)

Nsiika is a town in Buhweju District, in Western Uganda. It is the main municipal, administrative and commercial center in Buhweju District, and is the location of the district headquarters.

== Location ==
Nsiika is located approximately 53 kilometres (33 mi), by road, northwest of Mbarara, the largest city in the sub-region. This is approximately 310 kilometres (190 mi), by road, southwest of Kampala, the capital of Uganda and the largest city in that country. The coordinates of Nsiika are: 0°20'53.0"S, 30°26'04.0"E (Latitude:-0.348056; Longitude:30.434444).

== Overview ==
The population of the town of Nsiika is not publicly known, but as of 31 October 2013, there were 1,046 registered voters in Nsiika Town Council.

The town attained town council status in 2010 when Buhweju became a district. The town faces my challenges, including lack of tarmac road, lack of a sewerage system, absence of a central garbage disposal system and absence of a centralized electricity grid. However, about 93 percent of the town inhabitants have access to piped water.

== Points of interest ==
The following points of interest lie within the town limits or near the edges of town:

- The headquarters of Buhweju District Administration
- The offices of Nsiika Town Council
- Nsiika Central Market
- Nsiika Fair Lodge, Restaurant and Shop

== See also ==
- Buhweju District
- Buhweju Kingdom
- Ankole sub-region
- Western Region, Uganda
