= Jacklet Atuhaire =

Ugandan politician (born 1981)

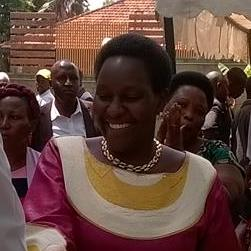
- Atuhaire in September 2015

Honorable

Personal details
- Born: Jacklet Atuhaire; 20 June 1981 (age 45) Sheema, Uganda
- Citizenship: Uganda
- Education: University of East London (BSc International Development and Information Technology); University of Dundee (MSc International Oil and Gas Management)
- Occupation: Oil, gas expert, politician
- Known for: Oil and gas management, politics

Jacklet Atuhaire Rwabukurukuru Mukwana (born 20 June 1981) is a Ugandan oil and gas expert, international development professional and politician. She is the elected Woman MP for Sheema District and is not affiliated to any political party in Uganda. She succeeded NRM's Rosemary Nyakikongoro who in 2015 had defeated her in the party's primary elections in controversial circumstances. Atuhaire is also a former guild president for the University of East London and is a member of the Association of International Petroleum Negotiators (AIPN) and the Society of Petroleum Engineers.

Prior to her senior political career, Atuhaire was the director for Extractive Energy Services and BFF Services Ltd. She is a former product development manager of WANA Energy Solutions, an ex project manager for Positive Care Link (PCL), a voluntary organization in London, and was once a project coordinator for International Refugee Trust (IRT) through JustGiving and other platforms.

== Early life and education ==
Atuhaire was born in Runyinya village, Kigarama Sub-county, Ankole sub-region on 20 June 1981 in an Anglican family of the Banyankole. She had her primary education in her home district of Sheema, acquiring her PLE certification in 1992 from Kamugungunu Primary School, a public primary school located in Kyagaju Parish, Kagando Sub county.

Atuhaire later attended Rweibare Senior Secondary School for her O-Level education and Universal Girls High School for her A-Level education, attaining her UCE certification in 1997 and her UACE certification in 2000. She was a head girl at Rweibare Senior Secondary School and a Scripture Union chairperson at Universal Girls High School.

Atuhaire further advanced to the University of Woolwich where she attained a Diploma in Public Administration in 2004 and then to the University of East London, where she was a guild president and graduated in 2010 with a Bachelor of Science in International Development and Information Technology. Subsequently, she acquired a Master of Science in International Oil and Gas Management in 2013 from the Centre for Energy, Petroleum and Mineral Law and Policy (CEPMLP), a graduate school at the University of Dundee, Scotland, United Kingdom.

== Career and politics ==
Upon attaining her UACE certification, Atuhaire moved to the United Kingdom and worked part-time from 2001 to 2004 as project coordinator for the International Refugee Trust (IRT). She then secured employment as a project manager for Positive Care Link (PCL), a voluntary organization in London, up until 2009 when she finished her bachelor's degree program at the University of East London. She then worked as a product development manager for WANA Energy Solutions from 2012 to 2015 when she resigned to join elective politics. Concurrently, Atuhaire founded and worked as the director for Extractive Energy Services and BFF Services Ltd from 2013 and 2016 respectively to date.

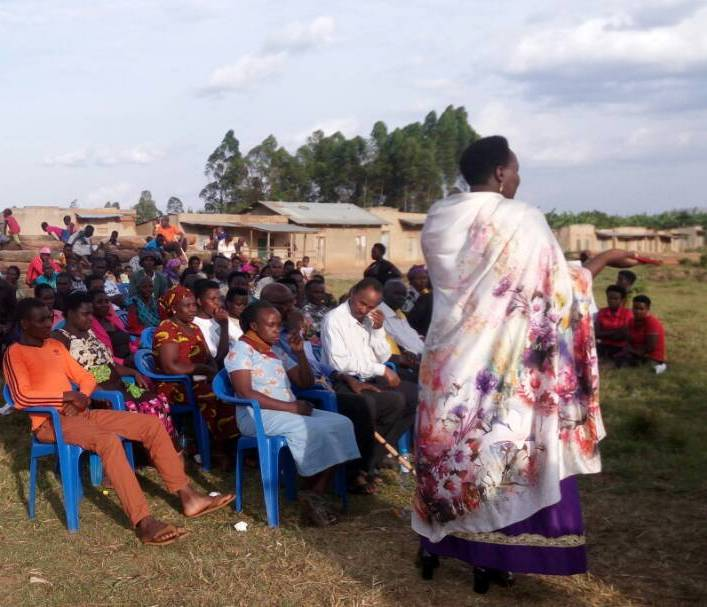
Atuhaire in 2017 at a community consultative meeting in Sheema District

Following her resignation from WANA Energy Solutions and subsequently kick-starting her political career, Atuhaire bid for the Sheema District Woman Representative seat on the NRM ticket and was controversially defeated in the party's 2015 primary elections by the then incumbent Woman MP, Rosemary Nyakikongoro. Her campaign office was set ablaze at the time destroying property worth millions of shillings as she had petitioned the primary election results sighting irregularities. In the office were documents of evidence to support her petition, she said:

This has been an intended act of terrorism. I am so saddened to see the mess that is here, this shocking incident took place at night. We have not established the cause of the fire but this has been a deliberate act by people who hate development of Sheema. My target is to see all people of Sheema, young or old, know how to use a computer, but it is a shame to find we have people who hate development.

On failing to agree with her party in regard to the results of the party primaries, Atuhaire joined the parliamentary race as an independent and won in the general elections of 2016, becoming a member of the 10th Parliament for the Pearl of Africa representing Sheema District.

In the 10th Parliament, Atuhaire serves on the Committee on Science and Technology and the Committee on Defence and Internal Affairs. She is also a member of the Parliamentary Forum on Climate Change (PFCC), the Parliamentary Forum of Oil and Gas, the Uganda Women's Parliamentary Association (UWOPA) and the NRM Parliamentary Forum.

== Personal life ==
Jacklet Atuhaire is married to Simon Mukwana and they have three daughters. She is a full member of the Association of International Petroleum Negotiators (AIPN) and an associate member the Society of Petroleum Engineers.

== See also ==
- Sheema District
- Parliament of Uganda
