= Rosemary Nyakikongoro =

Ugandan politician (born c. 1965)

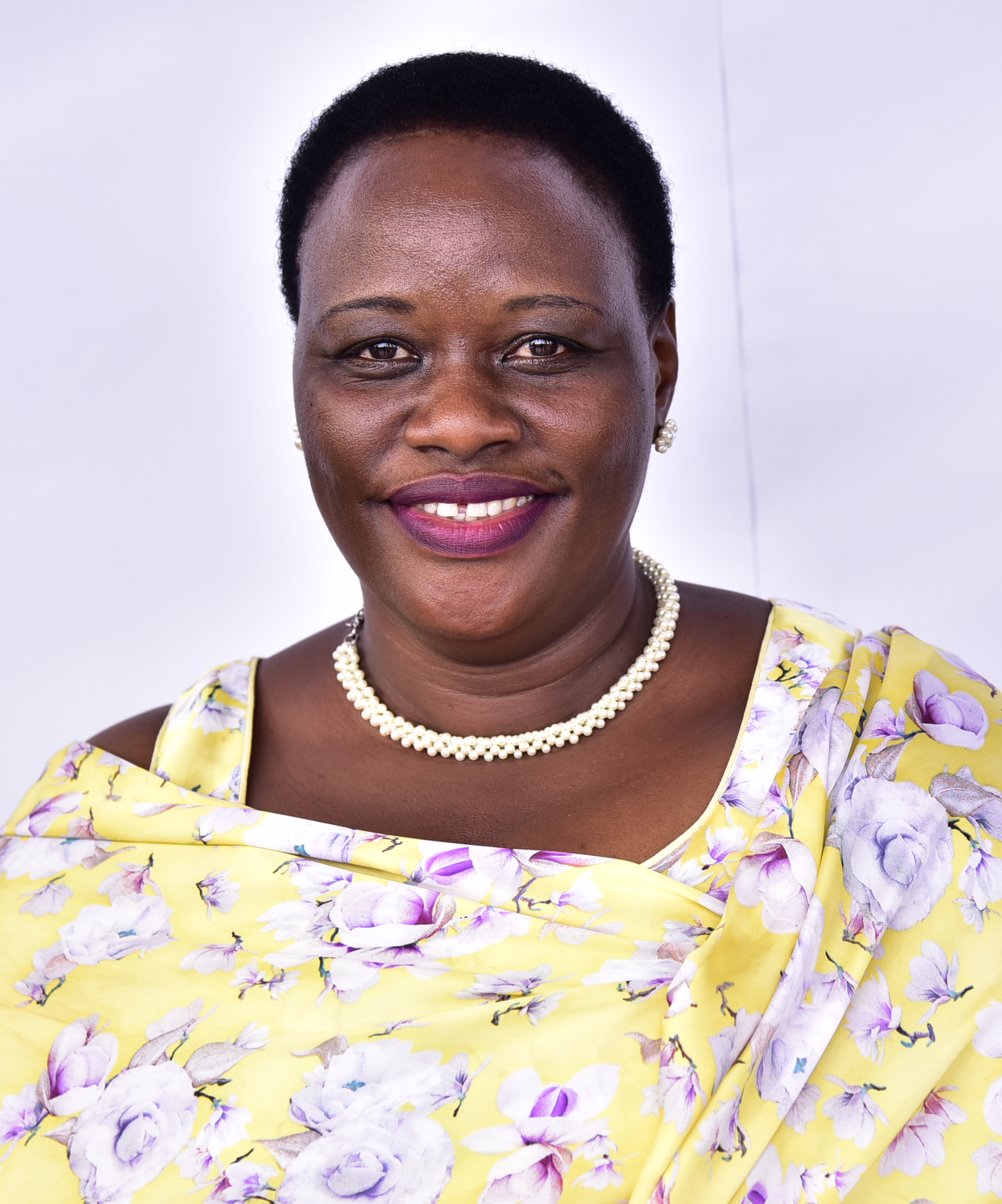

Woman Member of Parliament for Sheema District
- In office 2021–present
- Preceded by: Jacklet Atuhaire
- Constituency: Sheema District

Personal details
- Born: c. 1965 Uganda
- Party: National Resistance Movement
- Other political affiliations: Independent (2011–2016)
- Education: St. Mary's College Rushoroza
- Alma mater: Makerere University
- Occupation: Politician
- Profession: Women's activist
- Known for: Member of Parliament, Sheema District

Rosemary Nyakikongoro (born c.1965) is a Ugandan politician. She attended St.Mary's College Rushoroza for secondary education. She was an independent women's representative for Sheema District in Uganda's ninth Parliament (2011–2016). In the 2021 general election, she was re-elected as women's representative for Sheema District, this time standing on the National Resistance Movement ticket.

== Life ==
Rosemary Nyakikongoro gained a bachelor of social sciences and a master's degree in demography from Makerere University. She became a women's activist working with the Forum for Women in Democracy (FOWODE).

== Politics ==
In 2010, she attempted to represent the National Resistance Movement for Sheema District, one of five counties of the old Bushenyi District which was newly granted district status. After a high court decision overturned her candidature for the National Resistance Movement, Nyakikongoro stood and was elected, aged 46, as an independent candidate for Sheema District in the 2011 general election.

In July 2011, a meeting presided over by the first lady, Janet Museveni, NRM women MPs voted for Nyakikongoro over Ibanda District women's MP Margaret Kiboijana to be the NRM-endorsed candidate for the role of Uganda Women Parliamentary Association (UWOPA) chairperson. Opposition MPs accused Museveni of trying to divide women along political party lines and proposed Betty Amongi for the position. According to some reports, President Museveni and his wife wanted Kobijiana rather than Nyakikongoro as UWOPA chair, so some URM loyalists then chose to vote for Amongi.

In 2015, Nyakikongoro lost the NRM primary election to Jacklet Atuhaire. Standing as an independent candidate, she also lost to Atuhaire in the 2016 Ugandan general election. She secured a job as a member of the Judicial Service Commission (JSC).

Nyakikongoro won back the NRM nomination to be the women's representative for Sheema District in September 2020, polling 41,134 votes (41.7%) to beat the incumbent Atuhaire, who received 37,865 votes (38.4%). In the 2021 general election, she was elected to the eleventh Parliament.
