= St. Aloysius College Nyapea =

Ugandan boys' school

Location
- Nyapea, Zombo District; Uganda
- 02°27′31″N 30°56′53″E

Information
- Type: Public middle school and high school (8–13)
- Religious affiliation: Catholic Church
- Established: January 1, 1938; 88 years ago
- Founder: Brothers of the Sacred Heart (American Brothers)
- Enrollment: 150 (2018)
- Athletics: Soccer, track, tennis, volleyball, basketball
- Nickname: STALCONY
- Website: www.stalcony.ac.ug/wp

St. Aloysius College Nyapea is a boys-only boarding middle and high school located in Zombo District in the West Nile sub-region, in the Northern Region of Uganda. In the 1960s and 1970s the school was a seat of academic excellence. However, it fell on hard times in subsequent years, and as of 2018, was "a shadow of its former self. As from 2019 the former students of the college under the umbrella organisation, St. Aloysius College Nyapea Old Boys Association have introduced both infrastructure development initiatives and students busary schemes aimed at helping the under privileged and poor prospective students with strong academic interest to be sponsored for secondary education. As of 2023, more than 70 students have been enrolled under the scheme. The old boys involvement has led to the college enrollment more than doubling. They are now working with other institutions and people who believe that education is a potent tool in improving people's quality of life to support more prospective students while being cognizant of the social responsibility they bear to the surrounding communities as well".

== Location ==
The school campus is situated in Nyapea, a town located approximately 8 kilometres (5 mi), by road, north-west of Paidha, at the international border with the Democratic Republic of the Congo. Nyapea is about 10 kilometres (6 mi), by road, south-east of Zombo, where the district headquarters are located. The geographical coordinates of the college are 02°27'31.0"N, 30°56'53.0"E (Latitude:2.458611 Longitude:30.948056).

== History ==
The school was founded in 1938 in Gulu District by the Brothers of the Sacred Heart (American Brothers), and was later relocated to Nyapea in Zombo District.

In 2012, the government of Uganda allocated USh450 million (approx. US$180,000 at that time), to rehabilitate the school's dilapidated infrastructure. The funds were sourced from the African Development Bank under the bank's AfDB Four Grant Project.

However, the renovations were botched as only part of the work was done and what was done was determined to be substandard. Since then the Uganda's State House has commissioned a forensic audit of the school renovations.

== Recent developments ==
Supported by their Old Boys Association (Alumni Association), the school has started a slow academic comeback. Support comes in the form of student scholarships, mattresses, uniforms, books, and clothing.

== Prominent alumni ==
Former students of Nyapea College include a former prime minister, current and former cabinet ministers, lawyers, academics, and sportsmen. Some of the prominent alumni of the school include:

- Kania Mario Obiga: Member of Parliament for Terego County East, Arua District in the 10th Parliament (2016—2021) and State Minister for Internal Affairs in the Ugandan Cabinet.
- George Cosmas Adyebo (18 June 1947 – 19 November 2000): Prime Minister of Uganda, from 22 January 1991 until 18 November 1994.
- Dr Amos Nyathirombo: Medical doctor, who successfully carried out research on River Blindness.
- Fred Omach: Former State Minister for Finance (General Duties) in the Cabinet of Uganda.

== See also ==
- Education in Uganda
- List of schools in Uganda
