= Amos Nyathirombo =

Ugandan doctor

- Born: 1969 (age 56–57); Zombo District, West Nile sub-region, Uganda
- Education: St. Aloysius College Nyapea (O-levels), Namilyango College (A-levels), Makerere University (MBChB, MMed in Ophthalmology)
- Alma mater: Makerere University
- Occupations: Doctor, researcher, lecturer
- Known for: Research on ophthalmology, eye care, and tropical diseases, particularly river blindness (onchocerciasis)

Amos Nyathirombo (born in 1969) is a Ugandan doctor, researcher, and lecturer specializing in ophthalmology. He is best known for his research on eye care and other tropical diseases, particularly river blindness (onchocerciasis).

== Early life and education ==
Amos Nyathirombo was born in West Nile in Zombo District. He attended St. Aloysius College Nyapea for his ordinary level, Namilyango College for his Advanced level. He earned his Bachelor of Medicine, Bachelor of Surgery (MBChB) and a Master of Medicine (MMed) in Ophthalmology from Makerere University. He later became a Fellow of the East African College of Ophthalmology (EACO).

== Career ==
Nyathirombo has worked as a lecturer in the Department of Ophthalmology at Gulu University. He earlier worked at Makerere University and operated from Arua Regional Referral Hospital and Nyapea Hospital.

== Research ==
Nyathirombo was part of a team of scientists in several other African nations who co-developed and tested the effectiveness of moxidectin a veterinary drug repurposed as a river blindness treatment agent. The multiyear, World Health Organization-funded research determined that moxidectin was more effective at lowering microfilariae than ivermectin, and the findings were published in The Lancet. Oral moxidectin (8 mg) was licensed by the U.S. Food and Drug Administration in 2018 for adult and children ≥12 years of age.

== Public health ==
Nyathirombo has been involved in promoting West Nile eye care. As coordinator of the Lions Club of West Nile Comprehensive Eye Care Project, he spearheaded such efforts as the donation of an ophthalmic surgical microscope (value of UGX 12 million) and a refraction set (value of UGX 2.5 million) to Nebbi General Hospital during World Sight Day outreach. These initiatives helped more than 140 individuals for eye screenings and surgeries, subsidised vision correction and hearing aid services.

He was also part of a national survey of trachoma prevalence that informed Uganda's Ministry of Health policy, facilitating the delivery of treatment across endemic districts and helping to eliminate trachoma as a public health issue in the country.

== Awards and recognition ==
In 2018, Nyathirombo was honoured by Namilyango College with the NACOBA Award for Service to one's Calling- The Sciences in 2018. On 8 March 2025, on Uganda International Women's Day, President Yoweri Museveni conferred upon Nyathirombo the Diamond Jubilee Medal for his work in eye health and river blindness prevention.

On the 20 June 2025, Zombo district council organized thanksgiving prayers in his honor at Ukemu Primary School, Warr Town Council, and President Yoweri Museveni was to be present at the event. The event was a celebration of his years of service and contribution towards the eradication of river blindness in the area.
