= Ishaka =

- Location in Uganda
- Coordinates: 00°32′42″S 30°08′18″E
- Country: Uganda
- District: Bushenyi District

Population (2014 Census)
  - Total: 41,063
  - Ethnicities density: 0/sq mi (0/km^{2})
- Bushenyi - Ishaka Metropolitan Area
- Climate: Aw

Ishaka is a town in the Western Region of Uganda. It is one of the municipalities in Bushenyi District.

== Location ==
Ishaka is located in Igara County, in Bushenyi District, approximately 62 kilometres (39 mi), by road, west of Mbarara, the largest city in the sub-region. This is about 6 kilometres (4 mi), west of Bushenyi, the location of the district headquarters. The coordinates of Ishaka are 0°32'42.0"S, 30°08'18.0"E (Latitude:-0.545006; Longitude:30.138343).

== Overview ==
Ishaka is a town in Igara County, in Bushenyi District. Together with the neighboring town of Bushenyi, it forms the Bushenyi-Ishaka Metropolitan Area. It is the largest metropolis in the district. The district headquarters are located in Bushenyi. Kampala International University, one of the 31 universities in the country, maintains its Western Campus in Ishaka. This campus houses the university's medical school.

== Population ==
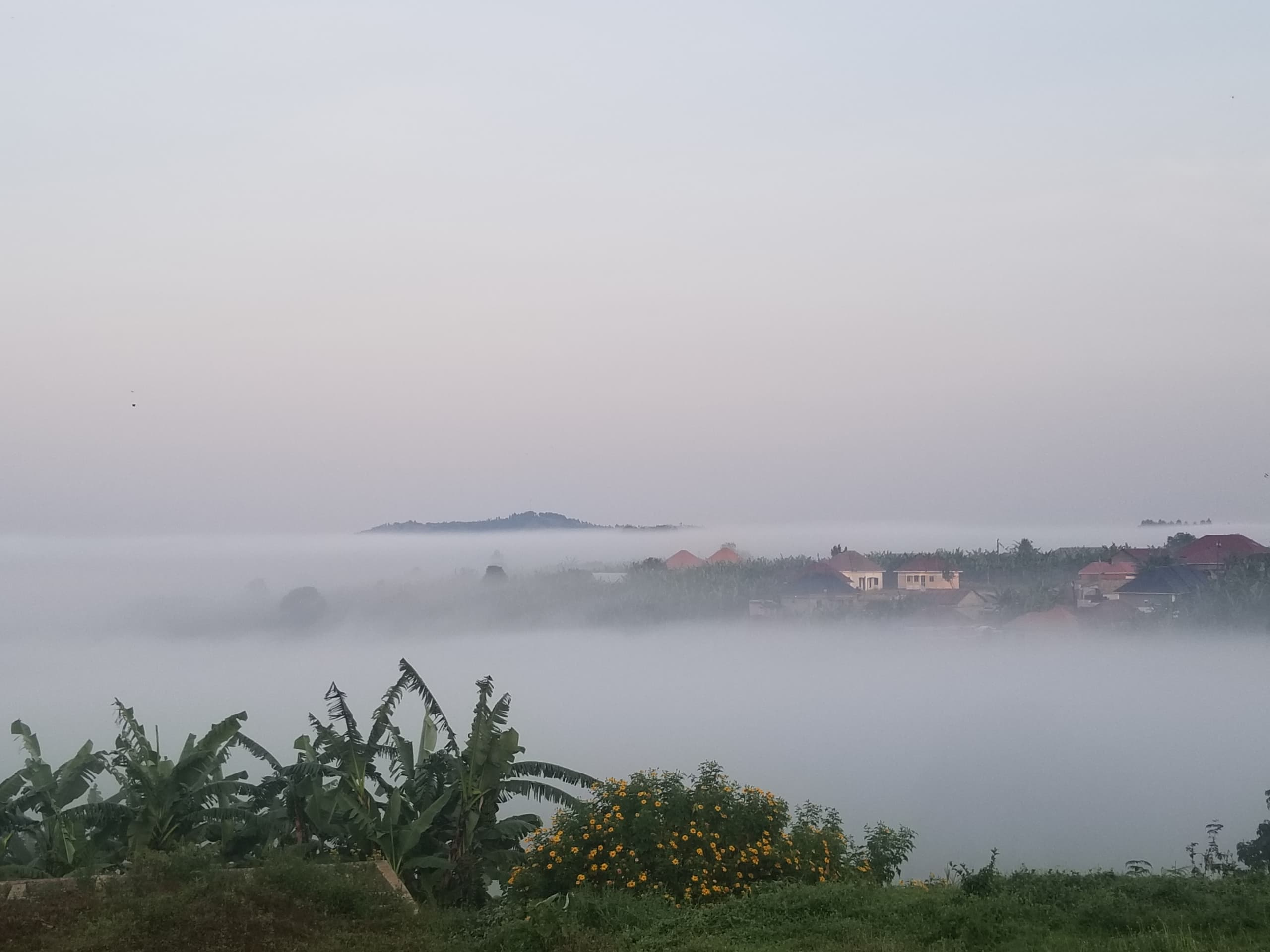
Morning dew in Ishaka

In 2014, the national census put the population of Bushenyi, including Ishaka, at 41,063.

== Points of interest ==
The following points of interest lie within or close to the town limits:

- The offices of Ishaka Town Council
- Ishaka Central Market - The largest source of fresh produce in the town
- The Western Campus of Kampala International University, one of Uganda's private universities.
- The confluence of the Ishaka–Kagamba Road, the Kikorongo–Ishaka Road and the Mbarara–Ishaka Road, in the middle of town.
- Ishaka Adventist Hospital - A 110-bed community hospital affiliated with the Seventh-day Adventist Church
- A branch of Stanbic Bank Uganda Limited - The largest of Uganda's licensed commercial banks
- A branch of Barclays Bank of Uganda - Uganda's third-largest commercial bank by assets
- A branch of Finance Trust Bank
- A branch of Pride Microfinance Limited - A Tier III Financial Institution

The town is currently being led by mayor Kamugasha Jakson who was the first to head the municipality on its creation.

== See also ==
- Bushenyi
- Kabwohe
- List of hospitals in Uganda
- Bushenyi District
