= Sheema =

Sheema Sheema Municipality
- Location in Uganda
- Coordinates: 00°34′52″S 30°22′46″E
- Country: Uganda
- Region: Western Uganda
- Sub-region: Ankole sub-region
- District: Sheema District
- Parliamentary Constituency: Sheema Municipality

Government
  - Member of Parliament: Elioda Tumwesigye
- Elevation: 4,630 ft (1,410 m)

Population (2024 Census)
  - Total: 98,594

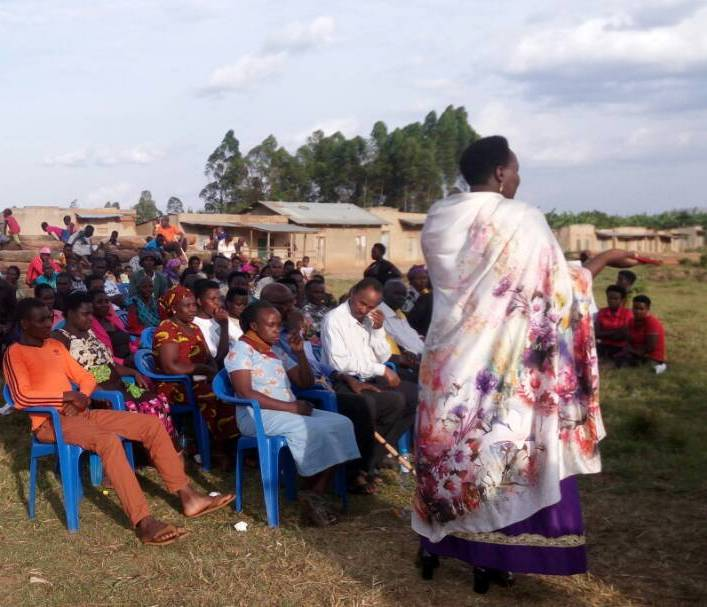
Community Consultative meeting in Sheema

Sheema, also Sheema Municipality, is an urban centre in the Western Region of Uganda. It is the largest municipality in Sheema District.

== Location ==
Sheema lies on the Mbarara–Ishaka Road, approximately 33 kilometres (21 mi) west of Mbarara, the largest city in the sub-region. This is about 29 kilometres (18 mi) east of Ishaka. The coordinates of the town are:0°34'52.0"S, 30°22'46.0"E (Latitude:-0.581111; Longitude). The elevation of the Kibingo neighborhood in Sheema Municipality is 1,410 metres (4,630 ft), above sea level.

== Overview ==
Sheema Municipality is an urban centre in Sheema District. It includes the neighborhoods of Kabwohe, Itendero and Kibingo, where the district headquarters are located. Sheema Town was created on 1 July 2018, when it was carved out of Sheema North Constituency.

== Population ==
In 2014, the national census put the population of Sheema Municipality (Kibingo-Kabwohe-Itendero), at 80,735 people.

== People ==
Agather Atuhaire, born here around 1988, was a whistle blower on government corruption.

== Points of interest ==
The following points of interest lie within or close to the town limits: (a) The offices of Sheema Town Council (b) Kabwohe Central Market, the largest source of fresh produce in Kabwohe (c) A branch of Stanbic Bank Uganda Limited (d) A branch of Pride Microfinance Limited (e) Emmanuel Church, Kabwohe, a place of worship affiliated with the Church of Uganda (e) The headquarters of Sheema District (f) Ankole Western University, a private university affiliated with Western Ankole Diocese of the Church of Uganda. (g) Nganwa High School, a secondary school administered by the Uganda Ministry of Education (h) Integrated Community Based Initiatives (ICOBI), an NGO in Kabwohe and (i) Kabwohe Clinical Research Center (KCRC), a research, development, and medical testing center.

== See also ==
- Sheema District
- Church of Uganda
- Uganda Hospitals
- Uganda Universities
- List of cities and towns in Uganda
