= Ankole Western University =

Private Christian university in Uganda

- Motto: Light of the world
- Type: Private
- Established: 2005
- Chancellor: Johnson Twinomujuni
- Vice-Chancellor: Andrew Ainomugisha PhD
- Students: 4,250+ (2024)
- Location: Kabwohe, Sheema District, Uganda; 00°34′28″S 30°22′44″E
- Campus: Rural
- Website: www.awu.ac.ug
- Location within Uganda

Ankole Western University (AWU) is an Anglican institution of higher learning in Uganda. It is owned and administered by the Western Ankole Diocese of the Church of Uganda.

== Location ==
The university is located in the town of Kabwohe, in Sheema District, Western Uganda. This location is approximately 300 kilometres (190 mi), by road, southwest of Kampala, Uganda's capital and largest city. The approximate coordinates of the university are:0°34'28.0"S, 30°22'44.0"E (Latitude:-0.574444; Longitude:30.378889).

== History ==
The resolution by the Anglican mission to start a tertiary institution of learning in Western Ankole was made in 2002. It was further resolved that the institution be situated at Kabwohe Hill. Ultimately, the institution would be called Ankole Western University. In order to build up to university status, the institution is named the Ankole Western Institute of Science and Technology.

In December 2005, the institute admitted the first batch of students to study for the Diploma in Education (Primary Education). In January 2006 another batch of students were enrolled to study for the Diploma in Agribusiness.

In November 2007, Ankole applied for a license as a tertiary college of learning. In July 2008, the license was granted and the institute was given authority to award certificates and diplomas in the fields of instruction where it offered courses.

As of January 2026, Ankole Western University has over four thousand three hundred students enrolled in various fields of study, including education, business administration, agribusiness, animal health, animal production, guidance & counseling, developmental studies, social work and social administration.

== Academics ==
As of September 2026, the university offers the following academic programs:

=== Directorate of Postgraduate Studies & Research ===
- Postgraduate Diploma in Business Administration: 1 year
- Postgraduate Diploma in Public Administration & Management: 1 year
- Postgraduate Diploma in Education Planning & Management: 1 year
- Postgraduate Diploma in Theology and Community Development: 1 year.

=== Faculty of Humanities and Management ===
- Bachelor of Business Administration (BBA): 3 years
- Bachelor of Public Administration and Management (BPAM): 3 years
- Bachelor of Social Work and Social Administration (BSWSA): 3 years
- Bachelor of Science in Accounting and Finance (BSAF): 3 years
- Diploma in Business Administration (DBA): 2 years
- Diploma in Public Administration and Management (DPAM): 2 years
- Diploma in Social Work and Social Administration (DSWASA): 2 years

=== Faculty of Education ===
- Bachelor of Arts with Education (BAED): 3 years
- Bachelor of Education (Primary & Secondary) (BED): 2 years
- Diploma in Education (Primary) (DEP): 2 years

=== Faculty of Agriculture ===
- Bachelor of Agricultural Science and Entrepreneurship (BASE): 3 years
- National Diploma in Animal Production and Management (NDAPM): 2 years
- National Diploma in Crop Production and Management (NDCPM): 2 years
- National Diploma in Animal Health (NDAH): 2 years
- National Diploma in Agribusiness Management (NDAM): 2 years

=== Faculty of Computing and Informatics ===
- Bachelor of Science in Information Technology (BSIT): 3 years
- Bachelor of Library and Information Science (BLIS): 3 years
- Diploma in Information Technology (DIT): 2 years
- Diploma in Library and Information Science (DLIS): 2 years

=== Faculty of Theology and Pastoral Studies ===
- Bachelor of Divinity (BDiv): 3 years
- Diploma in Theology (DTH): 2 years

=== UBTEB Certificate Programmes ===
- National Certificate in Business Administration and Management (NCBA): 2 years *
- National Certificate in Public Administration and Management (NCPAM): 2 years
- National Certificate in Information Communication Technology (NICT): 2 years
- National Certificate in Agriculture Production (NCAP): 2 years.

== See also ==
- List of university leaders in Uganda
- List of universities in Uganda
- Education in Uganda
