= Kania Obiga =

Ugandan politician

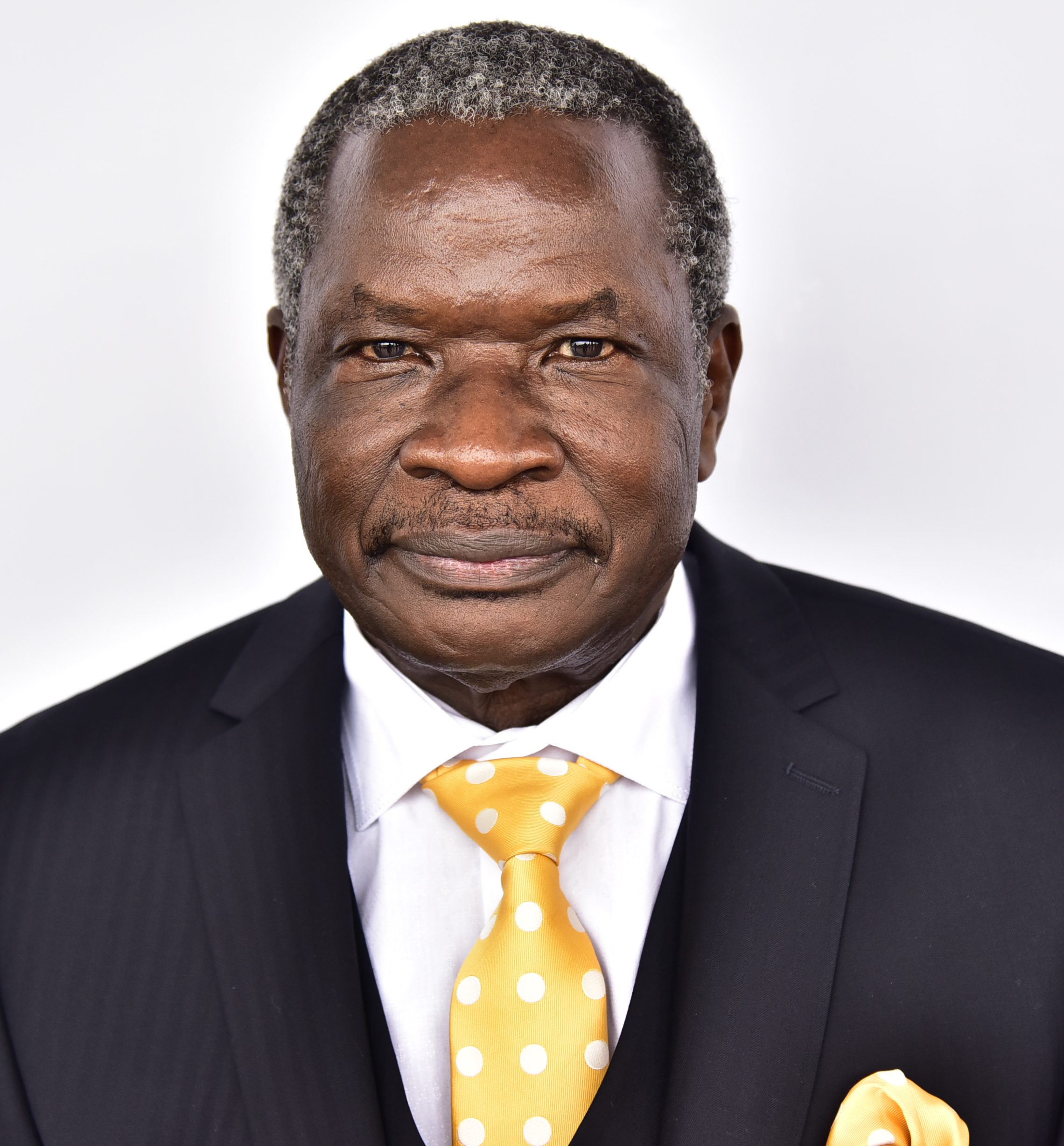
- Born: 1 January 1953 (age 73); Uganda
- Citizenship: Uganda
- Education: Makerere University (Bachelor of Commerce); Eastern and Southern African Management Institute (Master of Business Administration)
- Occupation: Politician
- Years active: 1994–present
- Known for: Politics
- Title: Member of Parliament for Terego County East, Arua District and State Minister for Internal Affairs in the Ugandan Cabinet

Kania Mario Obiga is a Ugandan politician. He is the State Minister for Internal Affairs in the Ugandan Cabinet. He was appointed to that position of 6 June 2016. He concurrently serves as the elected representative of Terego County East, Arua District, in the 10th Parliament of Uganda (2016–2021).

== Background and education ==
He was born on 1 January 1953. He attended Odupi Primary School, where he obtained a Primary Leaving Certificate in 1966. He transferred to St. Aloysius College Nyapea, in present-day Zombo District, graduating in 1970 with an East African Certificate of Education.

He was admitted to St. Mary's College Kisubi, in Wakiso District, where he graduated with an East African Advanced Certificate of Education in 1972. He then entered Makerere University, Uganda's oldest and largest public university, graduating with a Bachelor of Commerce degree in 1976. Later, in 2005 he was awarded a Master of Business Administration degree, by the Eastern and Southern African Management Institute. In addition, he s an Associate of the Institute of Chartered Secretaries and Administrators (ICSA).

== Career ==
Between 1994 and 1995, Kania Obiga was a delegate to the Constituent Assembly that promulgated Uganda's 1995 constitution. He was then elected to the Parliament of Uganda, serving in that capacity between 1996 and 2001. Between 2001 and 2015, he served as the Director of Research at the Secretariat of the National Resistance Movement political party. He was also a member of the Uganda Immigration Board from 2007 until 2011. In 2016, he elected to represent Terego County East, Arua District, on the National Resistance Movement ticket.

In June 2016, he was named State Minister of Internal Affairs, in Uganda's Cabinet.

== See also ==
- Alex Onzima
- Simon D'Ujanga
