= Fred Omach =

Ugandan politician

- Born: 16 April 1953 (age 73); Uganda
- Citizenship: Uganda
- Education: Makerere University (Bachelor of Arts in Economics & Social Administration)
- Occupations: Banker & politician
- Years active: 1978–present
- Title: State Minister for Finance (General Duties)

Fred Mandir Jachan Omach is a Ugandan banker and politician. He is the current chairman of the board of directors at Pride Bank Limited, a Tier II Ugandan financial institution. Before that, from 14 March 2017 until 2024, he was chairman of the erstwhile Uganda National Roads Authority,

He previously served as State Minister for Finance (General Duties) in the Ugandan cabinet. He was appointed to this position in 2006. In the cabinet reshuffle of 16 February 2009, and that of 27 May 2011, he retained his cabinet post.

He also served as the elected Member of Parliament (MP), for "Jonam County", Nebbi District from 2001 until 2016.

== Background and education ==
Omach was born in Nebbi District on 16 April 1953. He attended St. Aloysius College Nyapea, in present-day Zombo District, for his O-Level studies. He then attended Lango College in Lira for his A-Level studies, graduating in 1973. He entered Makerere University, the oldest university in East Africa in 1974, graduating in 1977 with a Bachelor of Arts degree in Economics and Social Administration.

== Career ==
After graduating from Makerere University, he was hired as a personnel officer by the Uganda Ministry of Public Service, in 1978. In 1979, he joined the now defunct Uganda Commercial Bank (UCB), the largest commercial bank in Uganda at that time. He rose through the ranks until he attained the rank of general manager.

Omach retired from banking and entered elective politics in 2001. That year, he successfully contested for the parliamentary seat of Jonam County, Nebbi District. He was re-elected continuously afterward, until he lost the seat in 2016.

In March 2017, he was appointed chairman of the seven-person board of directors at UNRA, the national roads authority in Uganda. His term was set to run until March 2020.

== Personal details ==
Omach is married. He has particular interest in Bible study, playing golf and reading.
