= Mbarara–Ishaka Road =

Road in Uganda

Coordinates: 00°34′46″S 30°23′31″E

Route information
- Length: 38 mi (61 km)

Major junctions
- East end: Mbarara
- Kabwohe; Bushenyi
- West end: Ishaka

Location
- Country: Uganda

Highway system
- Roads in Uganda

Mbarara–Ishaka Road is a road in the Western Region of Uganda, connecting the towns of Mbarara in Mbarara District with Ishaka in Bushenyi District.

== Location ==
The road starts in Mbarara, the largest city in Western Uganda, extending westwards through Kabwohe and Bushenyi to end at Ishaka, a distance of about 61 kilometres (38 mi).

== Overview ==
This road is a major transport corridor in the sub-region and for traffic from the sub-region to the urban centers of Mbarara and further east, Masaka and Kampala. The road was last renovated between September 1987 and December 1994, with loans from the World Bank.

== See also ==
- List of roads in Uganda
