= Bushenyi =

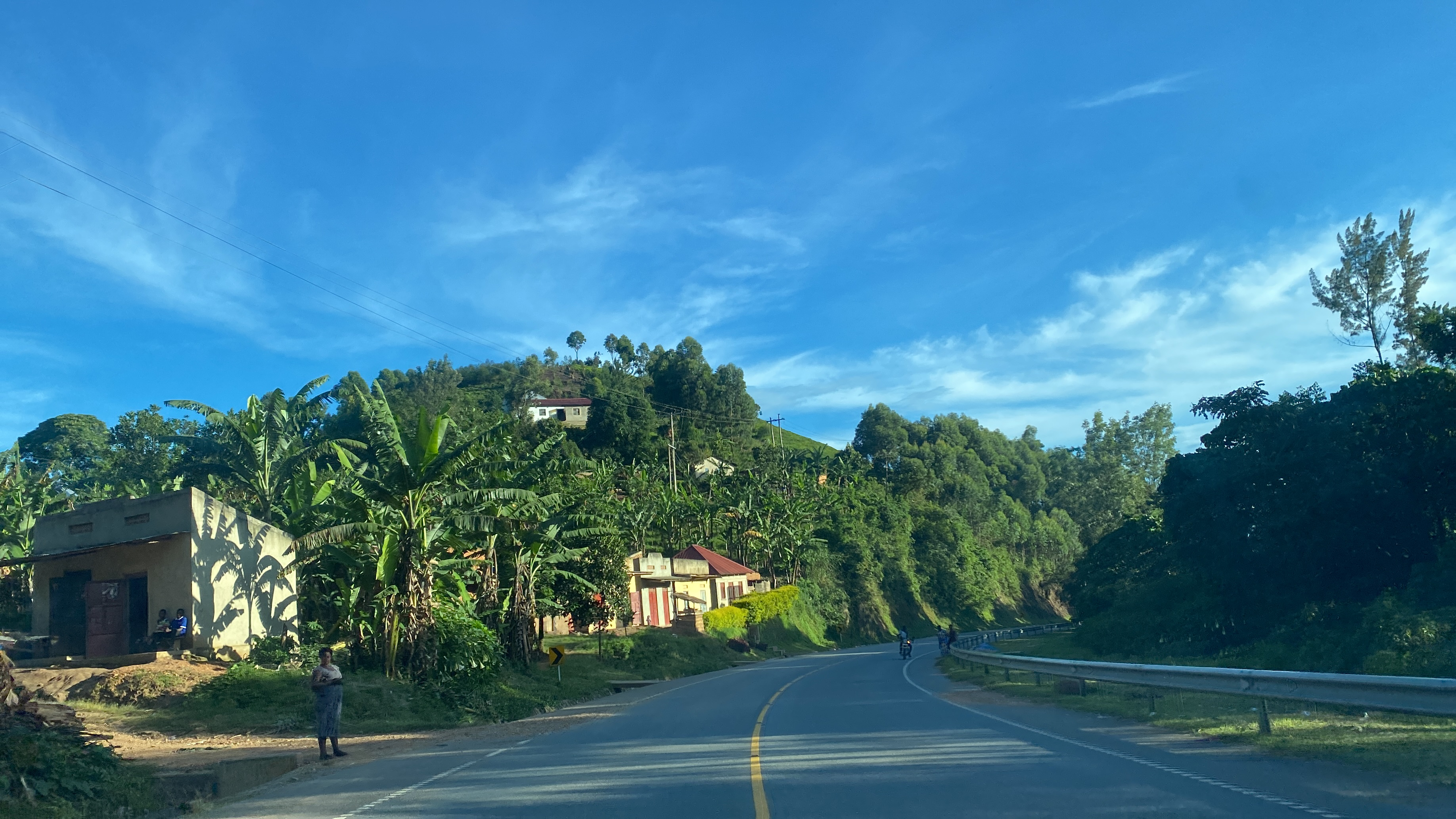

- Location in Uganda
- Coordinates: 00°32′30″S 30°11′16″E
- Country: Uganda
- Region: Western Uganda
- Sub-region: Ankole sub-region
- District: Bushenyi District

Population (2020 Estimate)
  - Total: 43,700
- Bushenyi - Ishaka Metropolitan Area
- Climate: Aw

Bushenyi is a town in Western Uganda. It is the 'chief town' of Bushenyi District and the site of the district headquarters. The district is named after the town, in keeping with the practice in most of the districts in the country.

== Location ==
Bushenyi is located on the Mbarara–Ishaka Road, approximately 54 kilometres (34 mi), by road, west of Mbarara, the largest city in the sub-region. This is about 7.5 kilometres (4.7 mi) east of the town of Ishaka.

Kampala, the national capital and largest city in the country lies approximately 321 kilometres (199 mi), by road to the north-east of Bushenyi. The coordinates of the town are 0°32'30.0"S 30°11'16.0"E (Latitude:-0.541667; Longitude:30.187778).

== Population ==
The 2002 the national census enumerated the combined population of Bushenyi-Ishaka Metropolitan Area at 37,664. In 2014, the national population census put the population of Bushenyi, including Ishaka, at 41,217. In 2020, the statistics agency estimated the mid-year population of the town at 43,700 inhabitants. UBOS calculated that the population of this town expanded at an average rate of 1.01 percent annually, between 2014 and 2020.

Historical population
Year	Pop.	±%
2002	37,664	—
2014	41,217	+9.4%
2020	43,700	+6.0%

== Points of interest ==
The following points of interest lie in the town or near the town limits: (a) the headquarters of Bushenyi District Administration (b) the offices of Bushenyi–Ishaka Town Council (c) Bushenyi Central Market, the largest source of fresh produce in the town.

Also located here is Ishaka Adventist Hospital, a 120-bed health facility administered by the Adventist Church.

National Social Security Fund, maintains a branch in this town. A number of Ugandan commercial banks, including Centenary Bank, Finance Trust Bank, DFCU Bank and Stanbic Bank Uganda maintain branches in the town.

The Western Campus of Kampala International University, including its 500-bed teaching hospital, are located here. Other notable educational institutions include Bweranyangi Girls' Senior Secondary School, a residential all-girls middle and high school and Uganda Technical College, Bushenyi.

Four national roads; (a) Mbarara–Ishaka Road (b) Kikorongo–Ishaka Road (c) Ishaka–Kagamba Road and (d) Kashenyi–Mitooma Road confluence in the town of Ishaka, in the Bushenyi–Ishaka Municipality.

== See also ==
- List of cities and towns in Uganda
