= Buhweju District =

- District
- District location in Uganda
- Coordinates: 00°18′S 30°20′E
- Country: Uganda
- Region: Western Uganda
- Capital: Nsiika

Area
  - Land: 802 km^{2} (310 sq mi)
- Elevation: 1,800 m (5,900 ft)

Population (2014 Census)
  - Total: 120,720
  - Density: 163.6/km^{2} (424/sq mi)
- Time zone: UTC+3 (EAT)
- Area code: 109
- Website: www.buhweju.go.ug

Buhweju District is a district in Western Uganda. It is one of the districts that constitute the Ankole sub-region. Its 'chief town', is Nsiika.

== Location ==
Buhweju District is bordered by Rubirizi District to the west and northwest, Ibanda District to the northeast, Mbarara District to the east, Sheema District to the southeast, and Bushenyi District to the southwest. Nsiika, the location of the district headquarters, is approximately 53 kilometres (33 mi) northwest of Mbarara, the largest city in Ankole sub-region. This location is approximately 310 kilometres (190 mi), by road, southwest of Kampala, the capital of Uganda and the largest city in that country. The coordinates of the district are:00°20'40.0"S, 30°25'00.0"E (Latitude:-0.344444; Longitude:30.416667). Due to the marked scarp that follow its southern, eastern and much of the northern boundaries, Buhweju is considered to be the most isolated county in Ankole.

== Overview ==
Buhweju District was carved out of Bushenyi District in July 2010. The district is part of Ankole sub-region, home to an estimated 2.56 million people, according to the 2014 national census. Districts that constitute Ankole sub-region include the following:

- Buhweju District
- Bushenyi District
- Ibanda District
- Isingiro District
- Kiruhura District
- Mbarara District
- Mitooma District
- Ntungamo District
- Rubirizi District
- Sheema District

== Population ==
The national census in 1991 estimated the district population at about 55,540. In 2002, the national census conducted that year put the population of the district at approximately 82,900. In August 2014, the national population census and housing survey enumerated the population in the district at 120,720.

== Natural resources ==
Buhweju District has proven reserves of gold, lime, copper, and timber.

== See also ==
- Nsiika
- Ankole sub-region
- Banyankore
- Runyankore
- Buhweju Kingdom
- Districts of Uganda
- Francis Mwijukye
