= Uganda Microfinance Regulatory Authority =

Agency overview
- Formed: 2017
- Jurisdiction: Government of Uganda
- Headquarters: Kampala, Uganda
- Agency executives: Chairperson, Jacqueline Mbabazi; Executive Director, Edith Namugga Tusuubira
- Parent agency: Uganda Ministry of Finance, Planning and Economic Development
- Website: www.umra.go.ug

The Uganda Microfinance Regulatory Authority (UMRA) is a government agency responsible for the licensing, supervision and regulation of Tier-4 micro finance institutions, money lenders, savings cooperatives and any money-lending institution with capital of less than USh500 million (US$140,000). Tier-4 institutions are those that do not accept financial deposits and are not under the supervision of the Bank of Uganda, the central bank and national banking regulator.

== History ==
As early as 2013, the government of Uganda announced its intentions to create a government agency to regulate money lenders who were not regulated by the central bank.

In May 2016, the Parliament of Uganda passed the Tier IV Microfinance Institutions Act, to take effect on 1 July 2017. The establishment of the UMRA was a key provision of the Act. UMRA is expected to promote a sound and sustainable non-banking financial institution's sector and offer financial consumer protection and financial inclusion, financial stability, and protection among the low income population in Uganda.

== Overview ==
UMRA came into existence on 1 January 2017. The new institution regulates money lending between Ugandans and the hitherto non-regulated Tier-4 microfinance institutions and other private money lenders. It also authorizes the Minister of State for Microfinance, to set the interest rates which moneylenders should charge borrowers. On 8 December 2017, the State Minister of Finance for Microfinance, Haruna Kasolo Kyeyune inaugurated the board of directors, including its chairperson and executive director.

== See also ==
- Economy of Uganda
- Uganda Ministry of Finance, Planning & Economic Development
