= Ishaka–Kagamba Road =

Road in Uganda

Coordinates: 00°40′33″S 30°09′18″E

Route information
- Length: 22.1 mi (35.6 km)
- History: Designated in 2012; Completed in 2016

Major junctions
- South end: Kagamba
- North end: Ishaka

Location
- Country: Uganda

Highway system
- Roads in Uganda

The Ishaka–Kagamba Road in the Western Region of Uganda connects the town of Kagamba in Ntungamo District with Ishaka in Bushenyi District.

== Location ==
The road starts at Kagamba, 15 kilometres (9 mi) west of Ntungamo, on the road to Rukungiri, and continues north through Kitagata in Sheema District and Kashenyi in Bushenyi District, to end in Ishaka, a distance of approximately 36.5 kilometres (23 mi). The road connects traffic from Rwanda, Burundi, and southwestern Uganda, that is destined for the oil-rich Albertine graben, directly with the Mbarara-Katunguru highway.

== Upgrading to bitumen ==
The government of Uganda has earmarked this road for upgrading through the conversion of the existing gravel road to bitumen surface and the building of bridges and drainage channels. CODA & Partners, a Kenyan company, designed the road. The final detailed design project report was submitted to the Uganda National Roads Authority (UNRA) in November 2010. A consortium of General Nile Company for Roads & Bridges, from Egypt, and Dott Services Limited, from Uganda, won the bid to build the road for USh 97,476,095,241. Consulting engineering and supervision services were procured from a consortium of LEA International Limited of Canada in joint venture with LEA Associates South Asia Private Limited from India in association with KOM Consult Limited of Uganda for approximately US$2,141,850. Construction began on 6 February 2012. The road upgrade was fully funded by the government of Uganda. According to UNRA, completion is expected in December 2015. In his 2016/2017 budget speech given on 9 June 2016, the president of Uganda listed this road as "completed".

== See also ==
- Uganda Oil Refinery
- Economy of Uganda
- Transport in Uganda
- Uganda–Kenya Crude Oil Pipeline
- List of roads in Uganda
