= Bushenyi District =

- District
- District location in Uganda
- Coordinates: 00°33′S 30°12′E
- Country: Uganda
- Region: Western Uganda
- Sub-region: Ankole sub-region
- Capital: Bushenyi

Area
  - Total: 942.3 km^{2} (363.8 sq mi)

Population (2012 Estimate)
  - Total: 251,400
  - Density: 266.8/km^{2} (691/sq mi)
- Time zone: UTC+3 (EAT)
- Area code: 004
- Website: www.bushenyi.go.ug

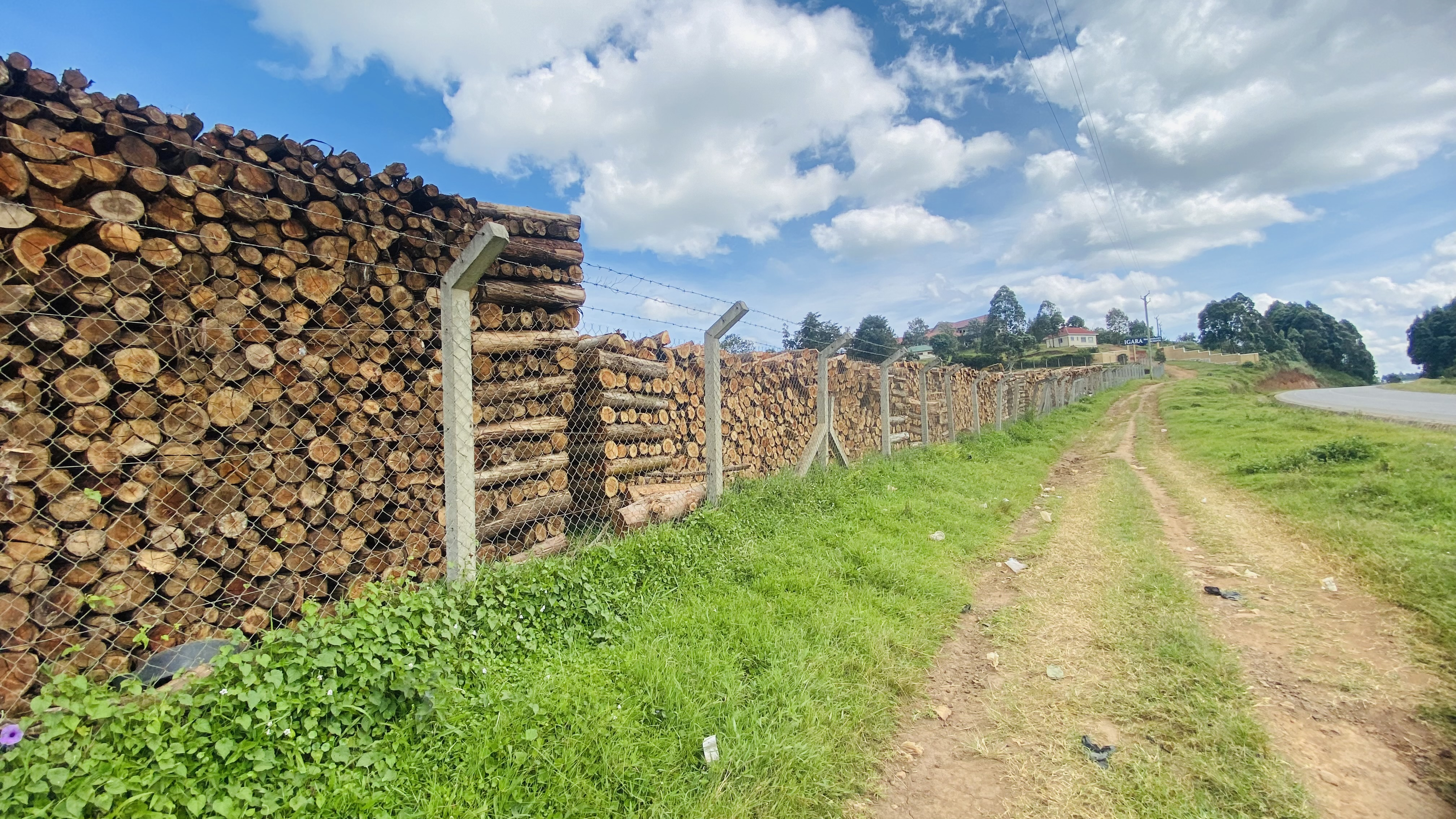
Piles of chopped dry ecalyptus wood in near Butare town in Bushenyi district in Western Uganda.

Bushenyi District is a district in Western Uganda. Like many other Ugandan districts, it is named after its chief town, Bushenyi, where the district headquarters are located.

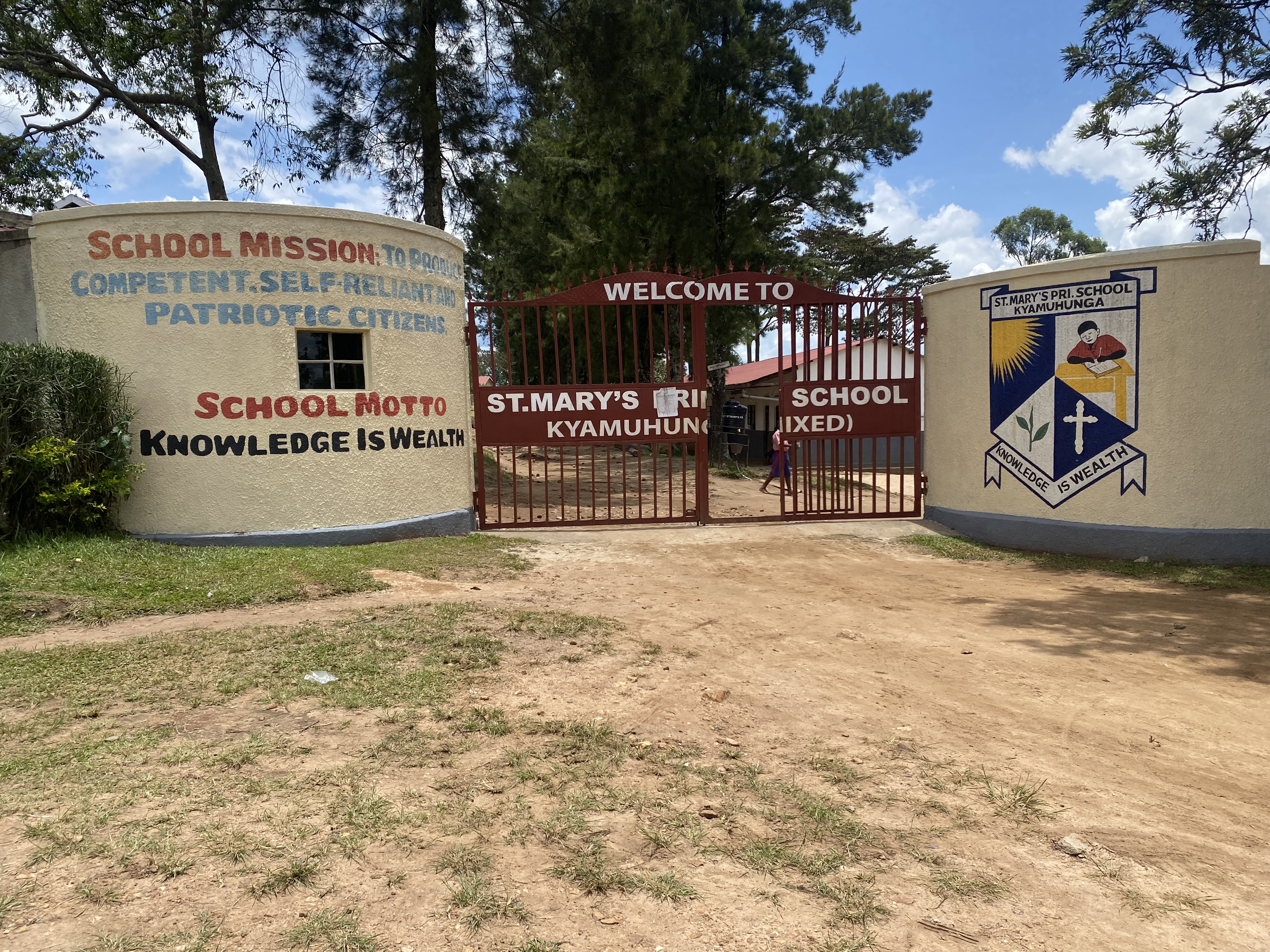
St. Mary's primary school Kyamuhunga in Bushenyi district.

== Location ==
Bushenyi District is bordered by Rubirizi District to the northwest, Buhweju District to the northeast, Sheema District to the east, Mitooma District to the south and Rukungiri District to the west. The largest town in the district, Ishaka, is located 75 kilometres (47 mi), by road, northwest of Mbarara, the largest city in the sub-region. The coordinates of the district are: 00 32S, 30 11E.

== Overview ==
Prior to 2010, Bushenyi District was one of the most western of Uganda's districts, by location. It covered an area of approximately 4,292.5 square kilometres (1,657.3 mi^{2}), of which 8.6% was open water, 2.2% was wetland and 18.3% was protected national forest reserve.

That changed on 1 July 2010 when, by an Act of Parliament, the old Bushenyi District was split into five new smaller districts, namely: (a) Buhweju District (b) Busheny District; new and smaller (c) Mitooma District (d) Rubirizi District and (e) Sheema District. The map shown above reflects the district before 2010. The district is part of the larger Ankole sub-region, consisting of nine districts, and home to an estimated 2.2 million Banyankole in 2002, according to the national census conducted at that time.

== Population ==
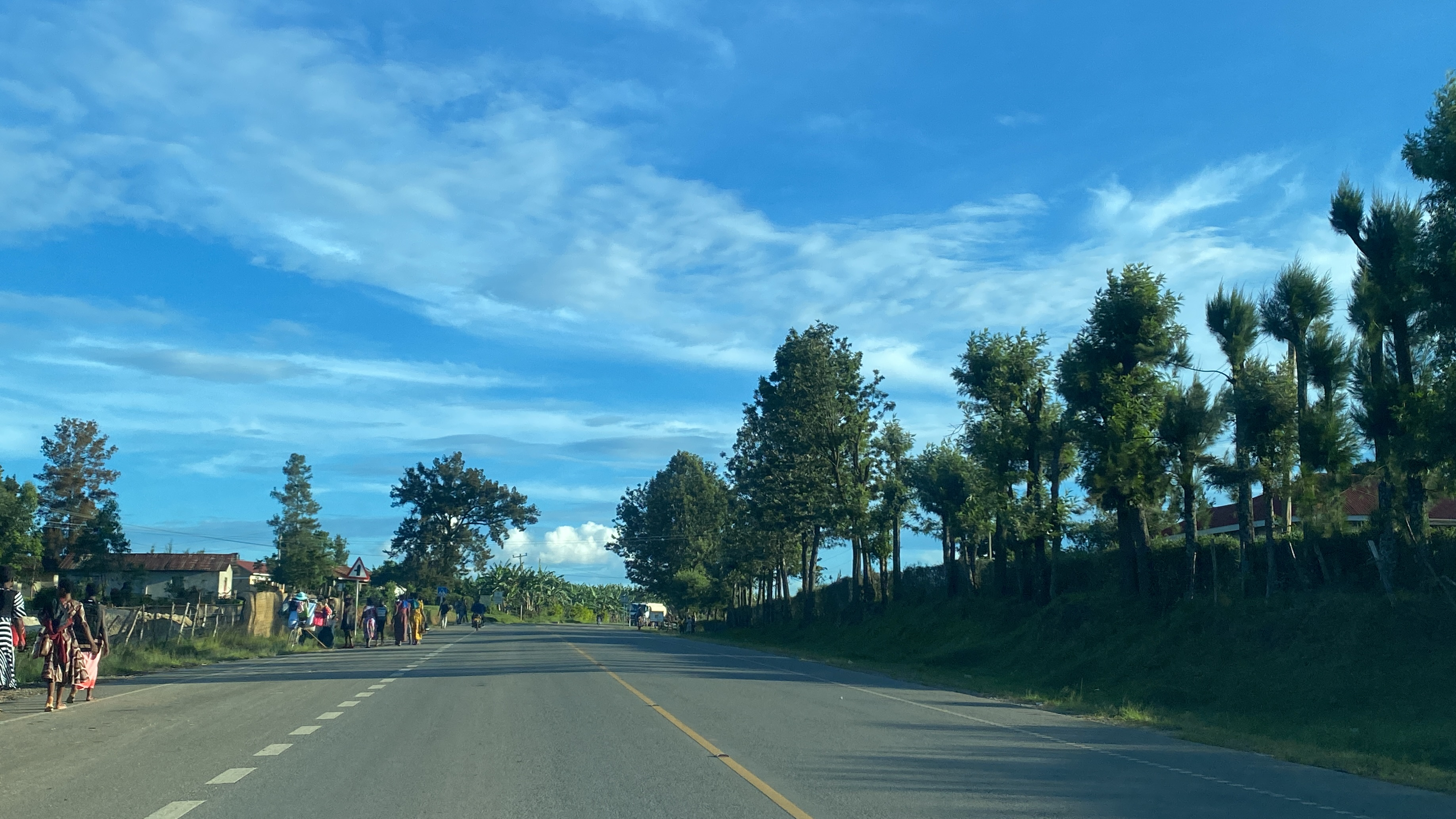
Trees besides Bushenyi to Kasese road in Kyamuhunga town council in bushenyi

In 1991, the national population census estimated the district population at about 161,000. In 2002, the district had a population of about 205,700, according to the national census bureau. The population growth rate in the district was calculated at 2%. It is estimated that the population of the district in 2012 was approximately 251,400.

== Economic activities ==
Bushenyi District is fairly endowed with natural resources. The district has relatively low poverty levels among its residents. The economy of the district depends mainly on agriculture. Agriculture is a source of food for the population, subsistence income for most families and provides direct employment to 86.7% of the district population, as well as supplying raw materials to industries. The majority of the people are involved in subsistence agriculture with some engaged in commercial production of crops including:

- Coffee
- Tea
- Sweet bananas
- Matooke

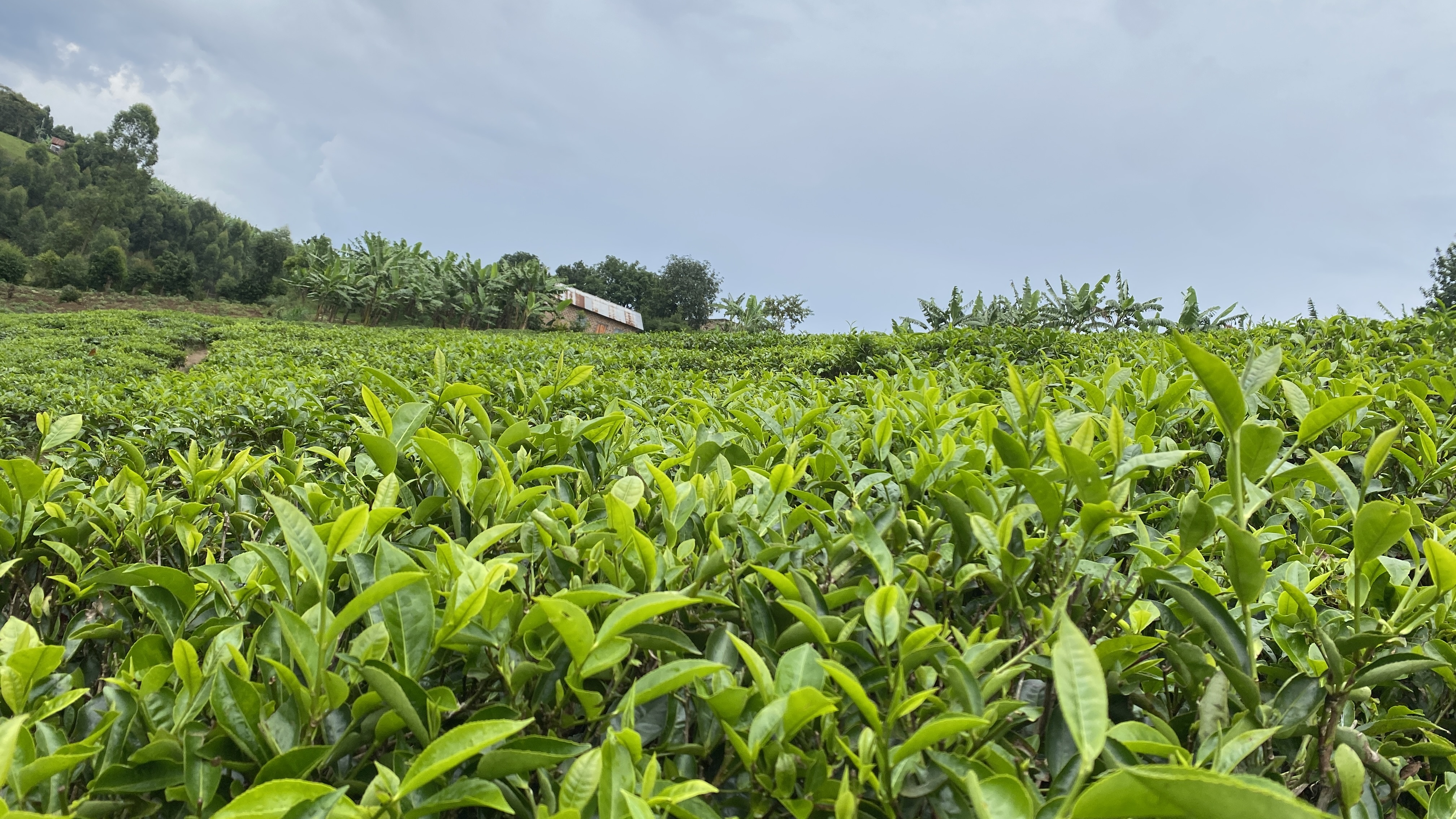
Green tea leaves and a cloudy in Bushenyi

Ranching for beef and dairy farming for milk production are widely practiced on both subsistence and commercial scales in Bushenyi District. Hybrid cattle are widely raised on farms in the district. The hybrids produce more milk per animal and yield more beef per carcass and therefore are more profitable than the local breeds.

Soil degradation, poor marketing and processing systems, and frequent out break of crop and livestock diseases are some of the challenges that the farmers in the district face.

== See also ==
- Bushenyi
- Ankole
- Western Uganda
- Uganda Districts
