= Ankole sub-region =

One of the western regions of Uganda

- Subregion
- Location within Uganda
- Country: Uganda
- Region: Western Region
- Largest city: Mbarara City

Area
  - Total: 15,067 km^{2} (5,817 sq mi)

Population (2024 census)
  - Total: 3,608,968
  - Density: 239.5/km^{2} (620/sq mi)
- Time zone: UTC+3 (EAT)
- Districts and city: Buhweju, Bushenyi, Ibanda, Isingiro, Kazo, Kiruhura, Mbarara, Mitooma, Ntungamo, Rubirizi, Rwampara, Sheema, Mbarara City

The Ankore (Nkore before the colonial era) was a traditional Bantu Kingdom in Uganda and lasted from the 15th century until 1967. The kingdom was located in the southwestern of Uganda.

Ankole sub-region is a region in the Western Region of Uganda that consists of the following districts:

- Buhweju District
- Bushenyi District
- Ibanda District
- Isingiro District
- Kazo District
- Kiruhura District
- Mbarara District
- Mbarara City
- Mitooma District
- Ntungamo District
- Rwampara District
- Rubirizi District
- Sheema District.

The area covered by the above districts constituted the traditional Ankole Kingdom. Milton Obote abolished the traditional kingdoms in Uganda in 1967. This was a bold political move that ended centuries of royal rule and centralized authority under his government. When Yoweri Museveni re-established them in 1993, Ankole did not re-constitute itself.

The sub-region is home mainly to the Ankole ethnic group. The people of Ankole are called Banyankole (singular: Munyankole). The Banyankole speak Runyankole, a Bantu language. Runyankole is very similar to Rukiga, spoken by the people of the neighboring Kigezi sub-region. According to the 2014 national census, the Ankole sub-region was home to an estimated 2.56 million people at that time.

== Geography and environment ==
The subregion lies in south-western Uganda within the Western Region administrative grouping used by UBOS.

Protected areas linked to districts in the subregion include:

- Lake Mburo National Park (associated with Kiruhura District).
- Queen Elizabeth National Park (associated with Rubirizi District).

== Demographics ==
In the 2024 National Population and Housing Census, Ankole sub-region recorded a population of 3,608,968.

Population structure (2024 census):

- Male: 1,684,729
- Female: 1,924,239

Age groups (2024 census):

- 0–14 years: 1,372,108
- 15–64 years: 2,084,082
- 65+ years: 152,778

UBOS subregional profile reporting for the 2024 census lists 842,783 households for Ankole sub-region.

District and city populations (2024 census):

- Buhweju: 167,921
- Bushenyi: 283,392
- Ibanda: 309,466
- Isingiro: 635,077
- Kazo: 208,898
- Kiruhura: 203,502
- Mbarara District: 174,039
- Mbarara City: 264,425
- Mitooma: 226,009
- Ntungamo: 552,786
- Rubirizi: 168,211
- Rwampara: 162,967
- Sheema: 252,275

== Economy ==
Livestock and dairy value chains form a major part of local livelihoods in south-western Uganda, with Mbarara frequently referenced in dairy supply and handling studies.

Indigenous Ankole Longhorn cattle remain culturally significant and are documented by FAO as a hardy local breed valued by pastoral communities in the Ankole area.

== Culture and languages ==
Runyankore-Rukiga (ISO 639-3: nyn and cgg) is documented as a Bantu language cluster associated with south-western Uganda, including areas linked to Ankole.

== Education ==
Mbarara City hosts higher education institutions including Mbarara University of Science and Technology. The city also hosts Bishop Stuart University (see official admissions portal).

== See also ==
- Regions of Uganda
- Districts of Uganda
- kigezi sub-region
- western region, Uganda
- Runyankore
- Banyankore
- Ankole
