= Sheema District =

- District
- District location in Uganda
- Coordinates: 00°32′S 30°24′E
- Country: Uganda
- Region: Western Uganda
- Sub-region: Ankole sub-region
- Established: 1 July 2010
- Capital: Kibingo

Area
  - Land: 699.1 km^{2} (269.9 sq mi)
- Elevation: 1,500 m (4,900 ft)

Population (2012 Estimate)
  - Total: 220,200
  - Density: 315/km^{2} (820/sq mi)
- Time zone: UTC+3 (EAT)
- Area code: 101
- Website: www.sheema.go.ug

Sheema District is a district in Western Uganda.

== Location ==
Sheema District is bordered by Buhweju District to the north, Mbarara District to the east, Ntungamo District to the south, Mitooma District to the southwest and Bushenyi District to the west. Kibingo, where the district headquarters are located, lies approximately 33 kilometres (21 mi) west of Mbarara, the largest city in Ankole sub-region. The coordinates of the district are:00 32S, 30 24E.

== Overview ==
Sheema District was created by an Act of the Ugandan Parliament, becoming operational on 1 July 2010. Prior to that, the district was known as Sheema County and was part of Bushenyi District. The district is part of Ankole sub-region. The districts that compose Ankole sub-region include the following districts: 1. Buhweju District 2. Bushenyi District 3. Ibanda District 4. Isingiro District 5. Kiruhura District 6. Mitooma District 7. Ntungamo District 8. Rubirizi District and 9. Sheema District. The sub-region was home to an estimated 2.2 million people in 2002, according to the national census conducted that year.

== Population ==
In 1991, the national census estimated the district population at about 153,000. The national census in 2002 estimated the population of the district at about 180,200. In 2012, the population of Sheema District was estimated at approximately 220,200.

== See also ==
- Kibingo
- Kabwohe
- Ankole
- Western Uganda
- Uganda Districts
