= Western Region, Uganda =

Region of Uganda

Western
- Region
- Coordinates: 00°39′S 030°41′E
- Country: Uganda
- Region: Western
- Regional capital: Mbarara

Area
  - Total: 55,276.6 km^{2} (21,342.4 sq mi)
- Elevation: 1,473 m (4,833 ft)

Population (2014 census)
  - Total: 8,874,862
  - Estimate (2011): 8,229,800
  - Density: 160.554/km^{2} (415.832/sq mi)
- Time zone: UTC+3 (EAT)
- HDI (2019): 0.524 low · 3rd

The Western Region of Uganda is one of four regions in the country of Uganda. As of Uganda's 2014 census, the Western region's population was 8,874,862.

== Subregions ==
As of 2010, the western Region contained four Political Subregions,

From North to South;

1- Bunyoro Sub-region

2- Rwenzori Sub-region aka Greater Tooro

3- Ankole Subregion and

4- Kigezi Subregion

== Tribes in Western Uganda ==
1. Bakonjo/Bamba.
2. Batooro.
3. Banyoro
4. Banyankore, Bahima, Bairu.
5. Bakiga.
6. Bafumbira.
7. Batwa.

== Districts ==
As of 2024, the Western Region, Uganda contained 3 cities and 34 districts:

Western region in blue.

District	Population (Census 1991)	Population (Census 2002)	Population (Census 2014)	Map	Chief town
Buhweju	55,534	82,881	120,720	81	Nsiika
Buliisa	47,709	63,363	113,161	10	Buliisa
Bundibugyo	92,311	158,909	224,387	11	Bundibugyo
Bushenyi	160,982	205,671	234,440	12	Bushenyi
Hoima	197,851	343,618	572,986	18	Hoima
Ibanda	148,029	198,635	249,625	19	Ibanda
Isingiro	226,365	316,025	486,360	26	Isingiro
Kabale	417,218	458,318	528,231	23	Kabale
Kabarole	299,573	356,914	469,236	24	Fort Portal
Kamwenge	201,654	263,730	414,454	31	Kamwenge
Kanungu	160,708	204,732	252,144	32	Kanungu
Kasese	343,601	523,033	694,992	34	Kasese
Kibaale	220,261	405,882	785,088	37	Kibaale
Kiruhura	140,946	212,219	328,077	40	Kiruhura
Kiryandongo	83,405	187,707	266,197	92	Kiryandongo
Kisoro	186,681	220,312	281,705	41	Kisoro
Kyegegwa	63,547	110,925	281,637	96	Kyegegwa
Kyenjojo	182,026	266,246	422,204	46	Kyenjojo
Masindi	129,682	208,420	291,113	52	Masindi
Mbarara	267,457	361,477	472,629	55	Mbarara
Mitooma	134,251	160,802	183,444	102	Mitooma
Ntoroko	24,255	51,069	67,005	106	Ntoroko
Ntungamo	305,199	379,987	483,841	66	Ntungamo
Rubirizi	75,361	101,804	129,149	109	Rubirizi
Rukungiri	230,072	275,162	314,694	71	Rukungiri
Sheema	153,009	180,234	207,343	111	Kibingo
Total	4,547,687	6,298,075	8,874,862	-	Mbarara

== Geography ==
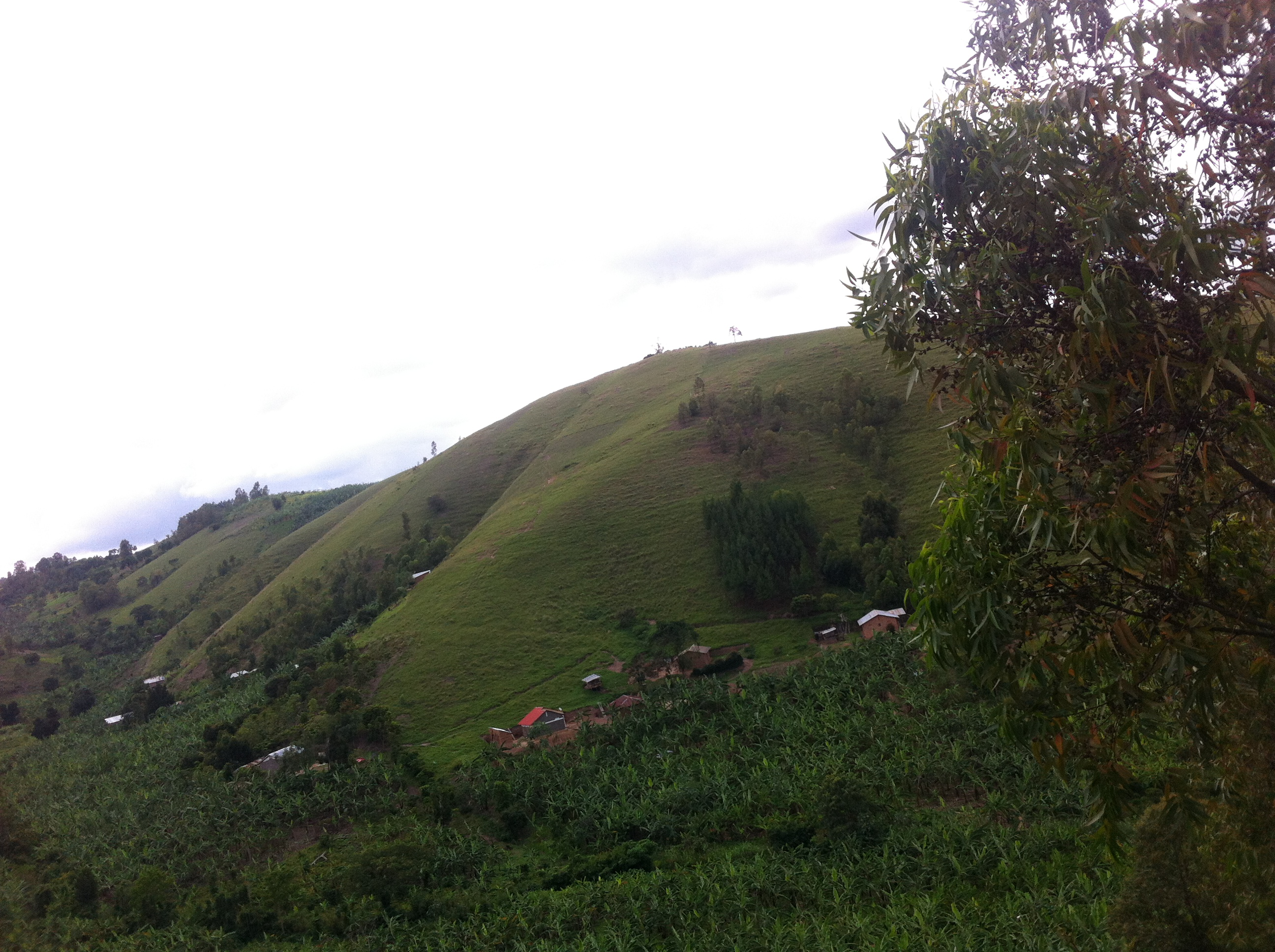
Village in Western Uganda

The Western Region borders with the Democratic Republic of Congo in the west and the Northern tip of Rwanda as well as Tanzania in the South.

It is home to the Banyakitara i.e Banyoro, Batooro, Babwisi, Songora people, Banyankore, Bakiga. And Bakonzo, Bamba, Bafumbira, e.t.c

== Tourist attractions in Western Uganda ==
Western Uganda is home to a number of national parks and protected areas, including:

- Bwindi Impenetrable National Park in south western Uganda, home to mountain gorillas and other primates like chimpanzees, L’Hoest monkeys, black and white colobus monkeys. The area is also home to forest elephants and bushpigs. The park is located over three districts: Kanungu, Rubanda and Kisoro District.
- Queen Elizabeth National Park is in western Uganda and is the second largest national park in the country and one of the oldest. The park is made up of wetlands, woodlands, savannah plains and forests. The park is located in Kasese District, with parts in Rubirizi, Kanungu, and Kamwengye districts. It borders the Democratic Republic of the Congo (DRC).
- Mgahinga Gorilla National Park is the smallest national park located in south western Uganda, located in Kisoro District. It was founded in 1991. The park is also home to mountain gorillas, along with Bwindi Impenetrable National Park. The park is home to the golden monkey, also found in Volcanoes National Park. Mountains in the park include Mount Sabinyo and Mount Muhavura which are part of the Virunga Range, which continues into Rwanda and the DRC.
- Kibale Forest National Park is located in Kibaale District. The park is home to chimpanzees, with the largest number and diversity in East Africa.
- Rwenzori Mountains National Park
- Lake Mburo National Park
- Lake Bunyonyi
- Semuliki National Park
- Bigodi Sanctuary

== See also ==
- Regions of Uganda
- Central Region, Uganda
