= Kampala =

Capital and largest city of Uganda

- Capital city
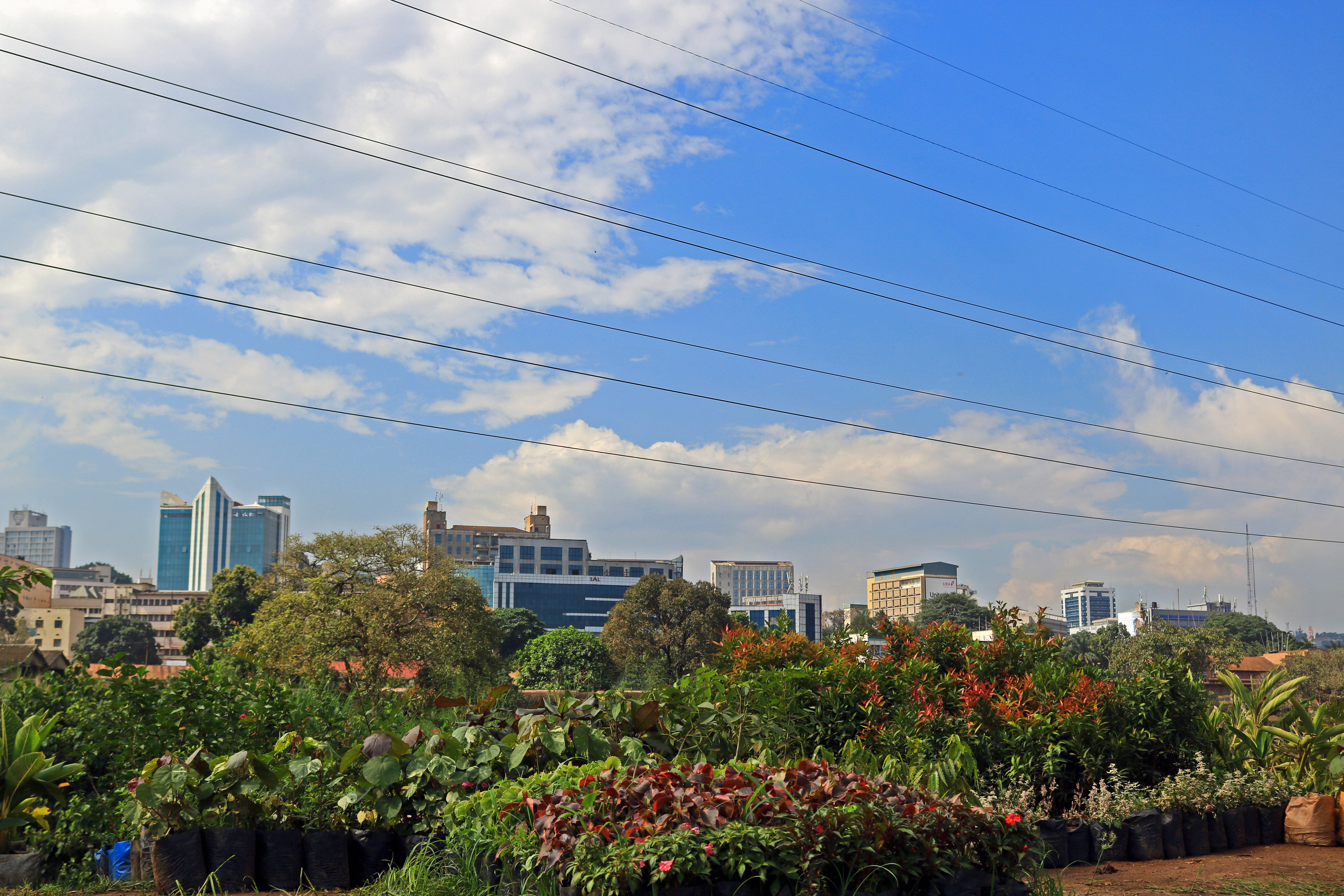
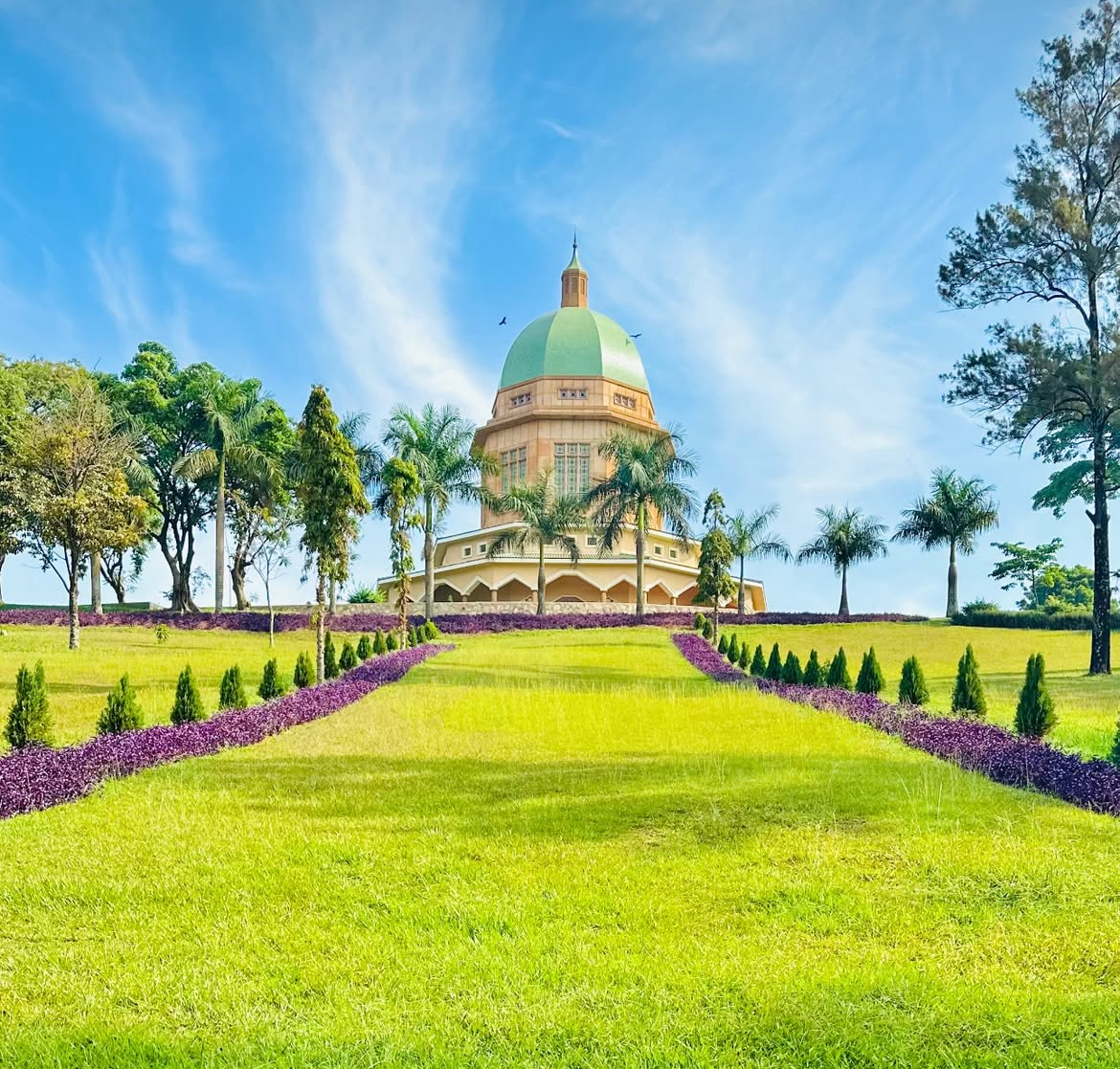
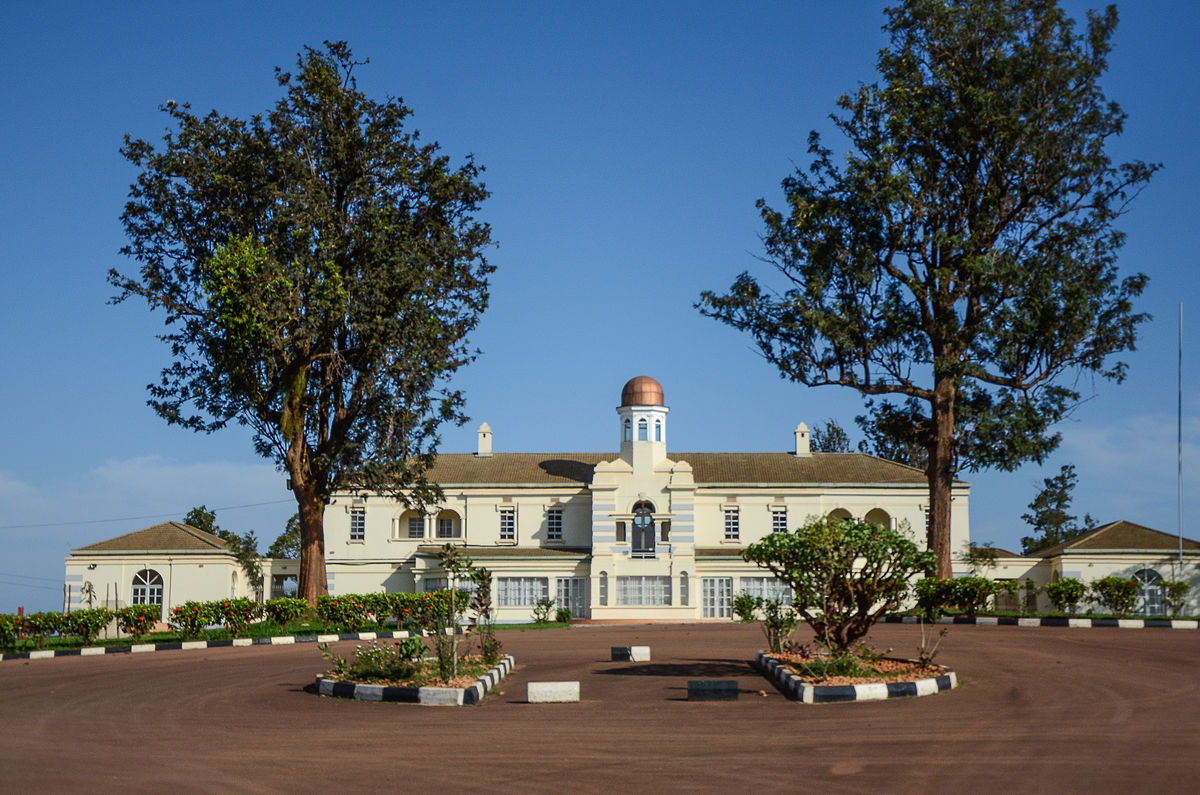
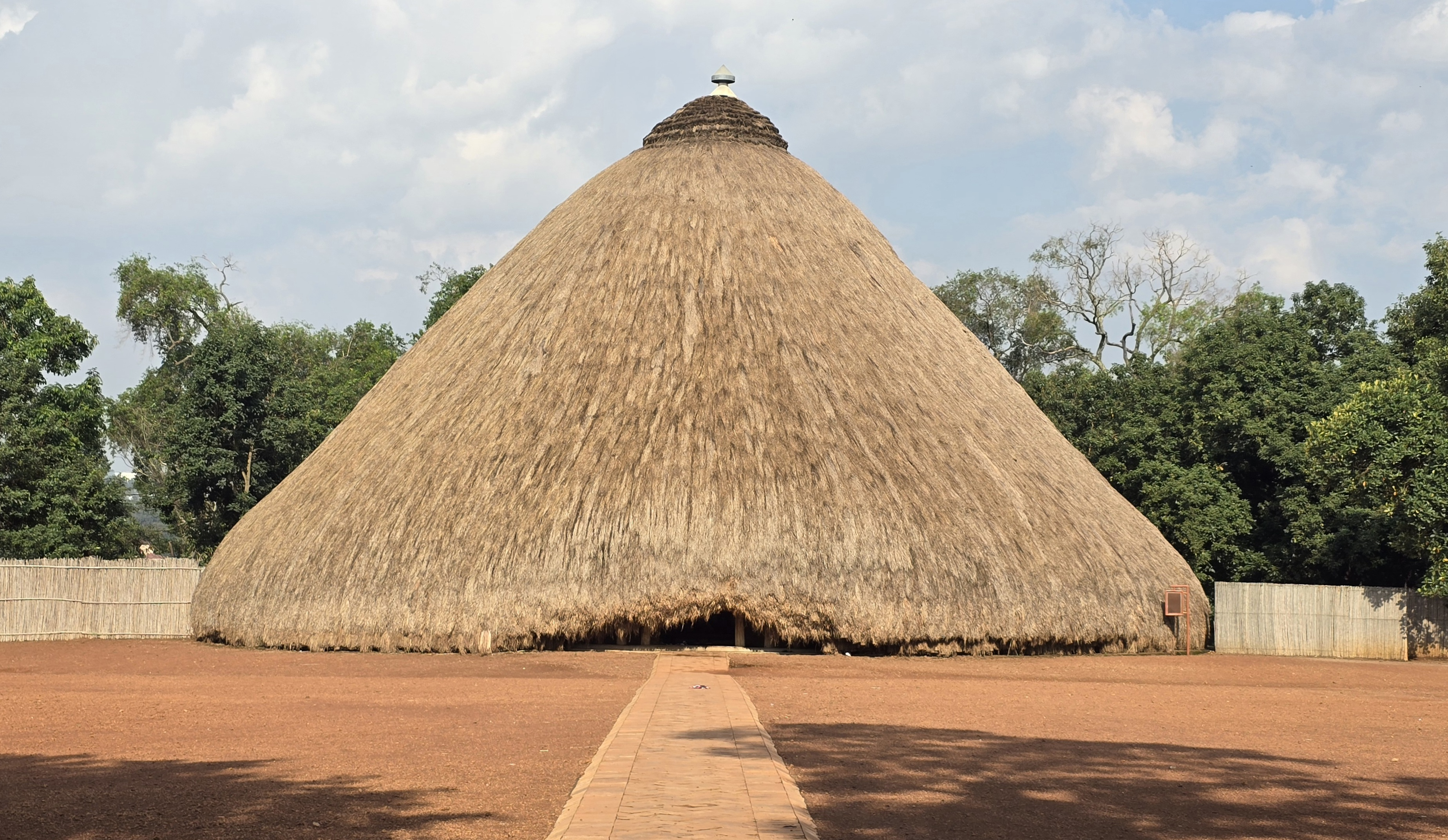
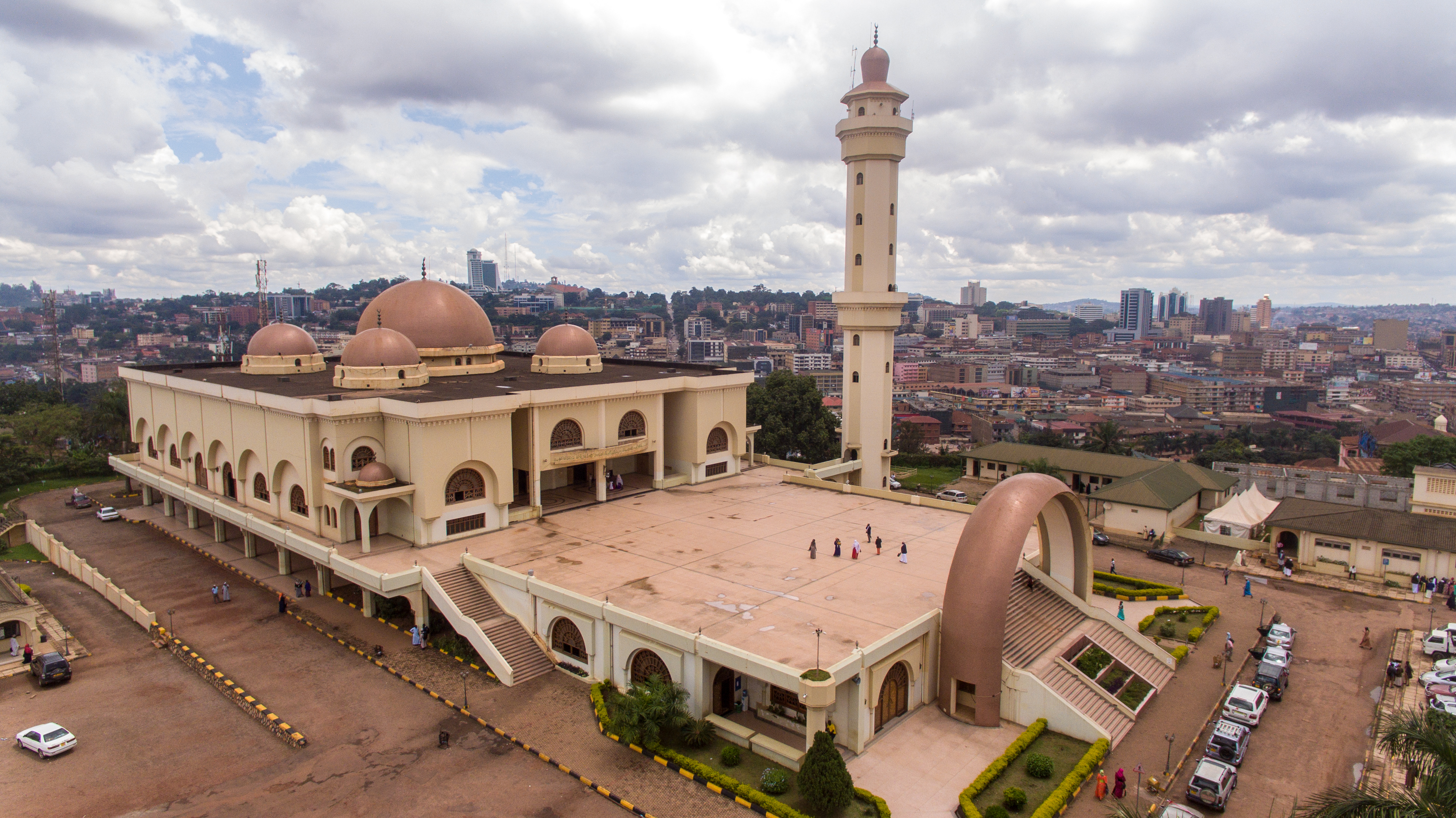
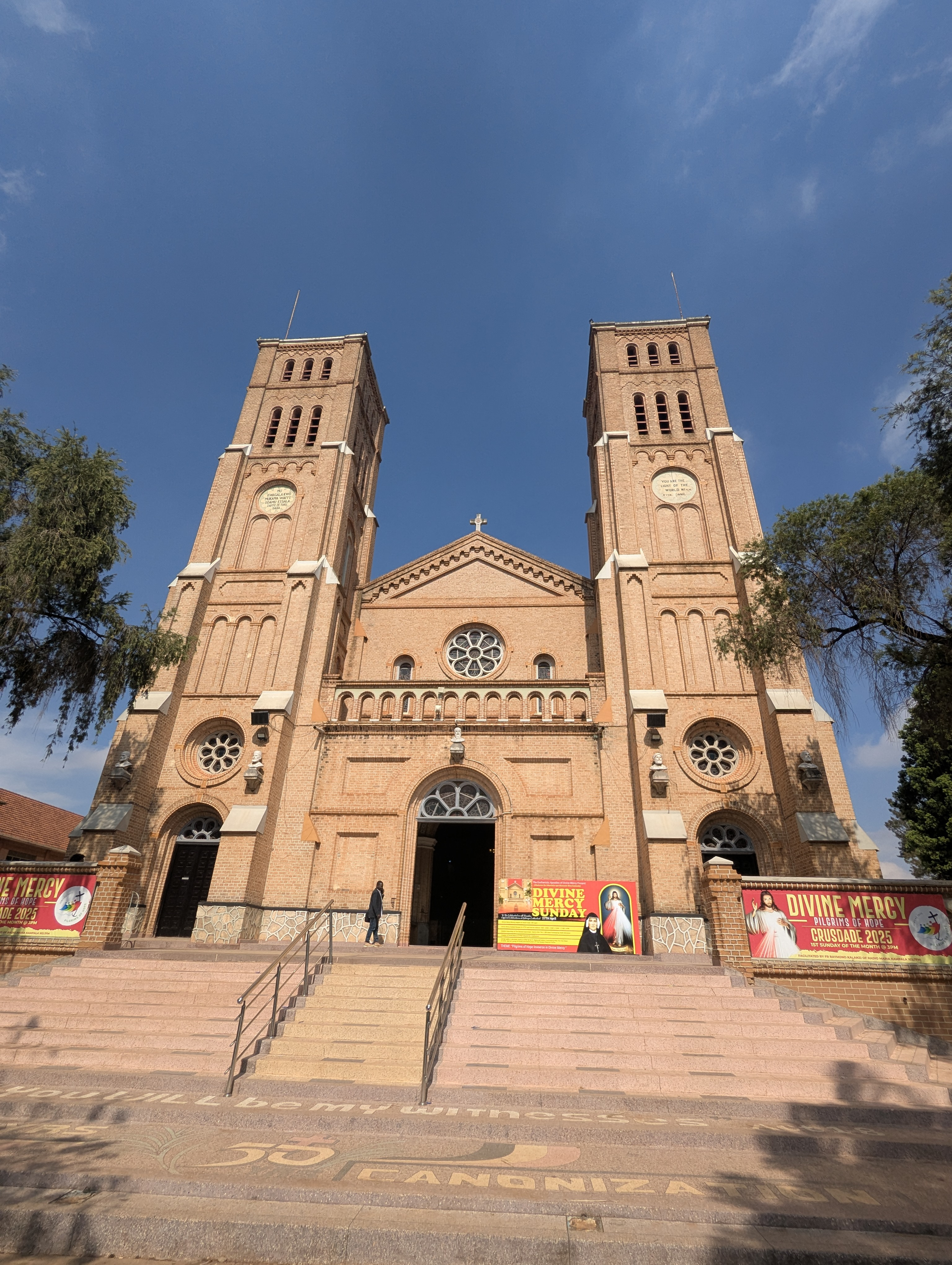
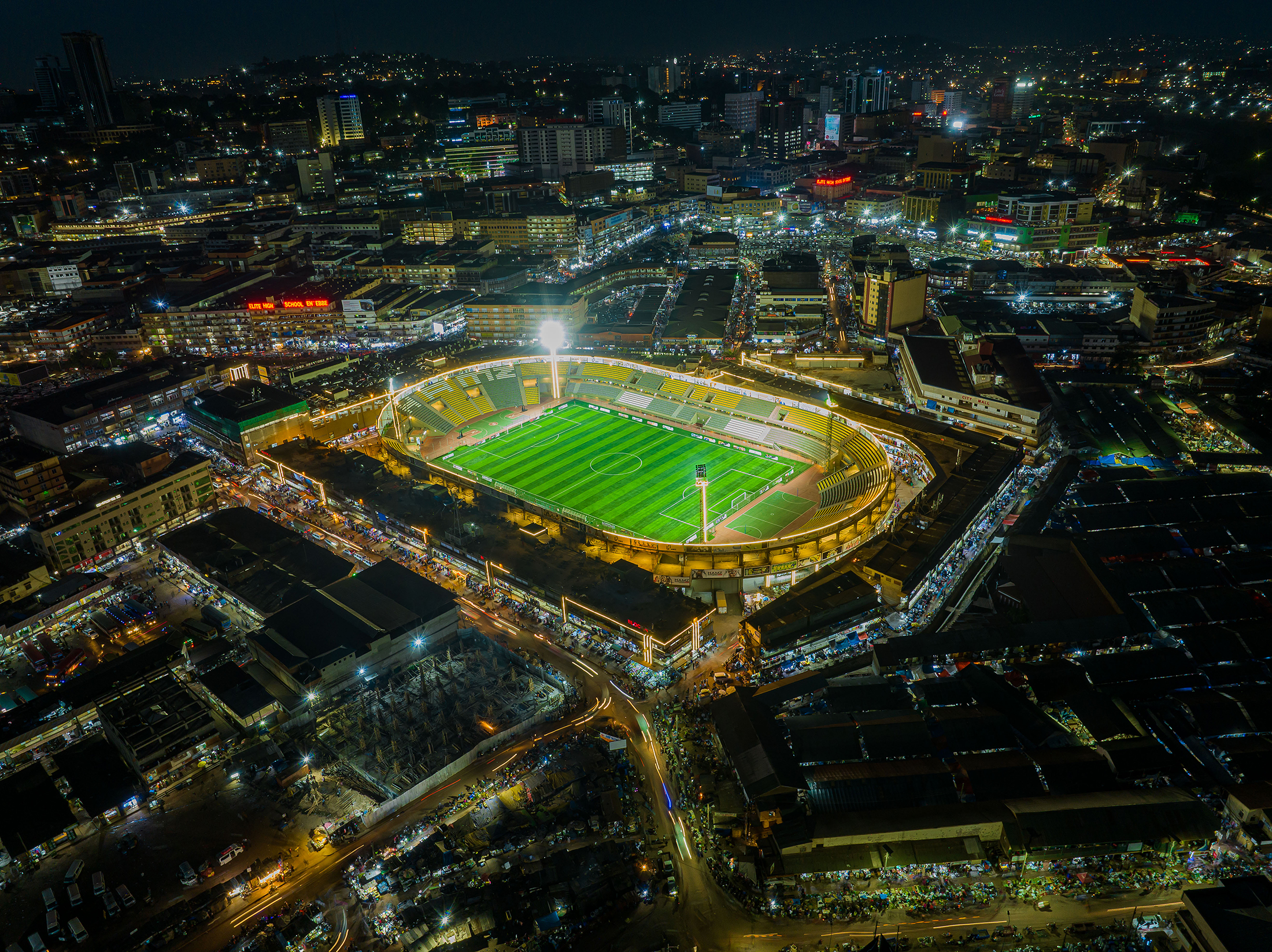
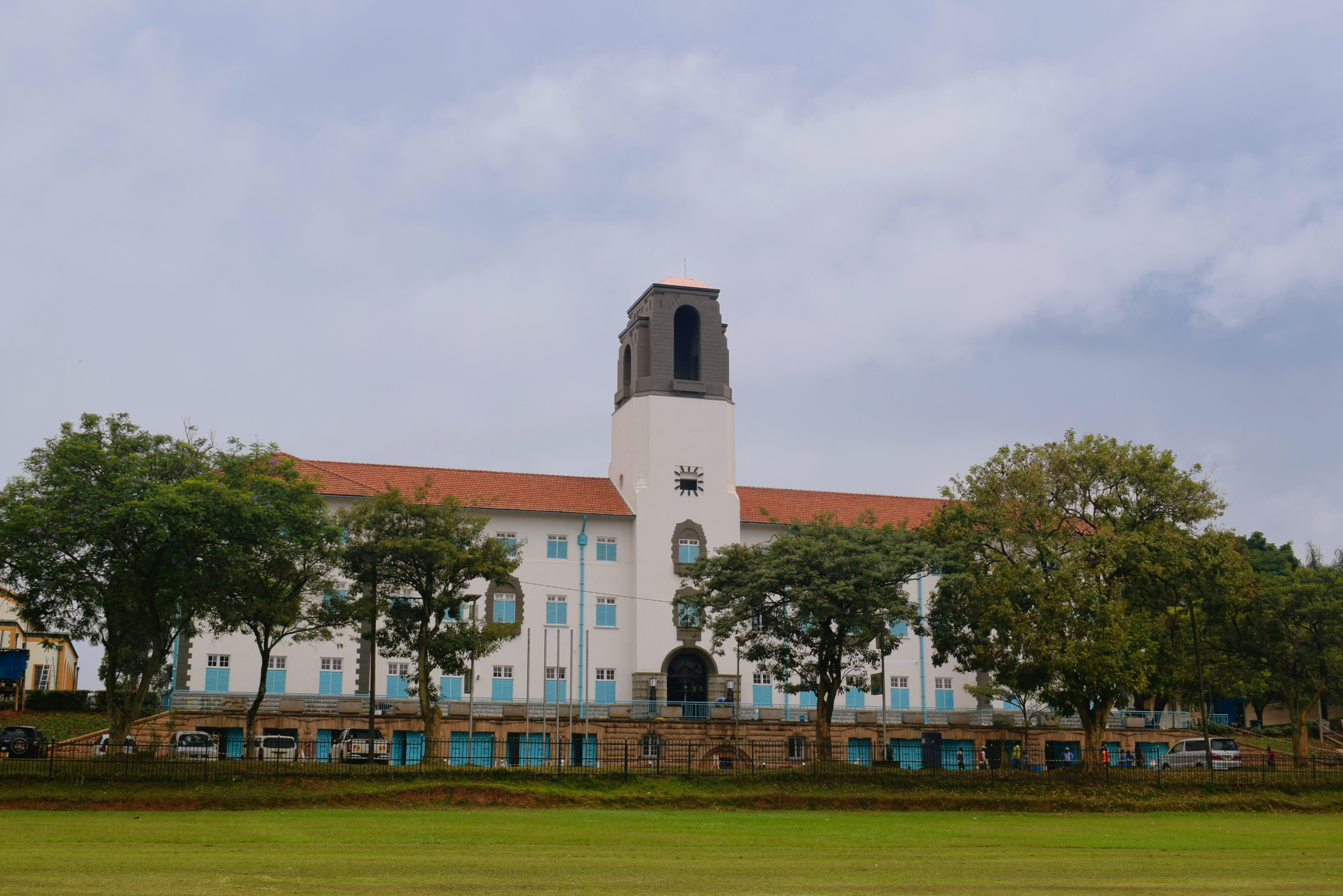
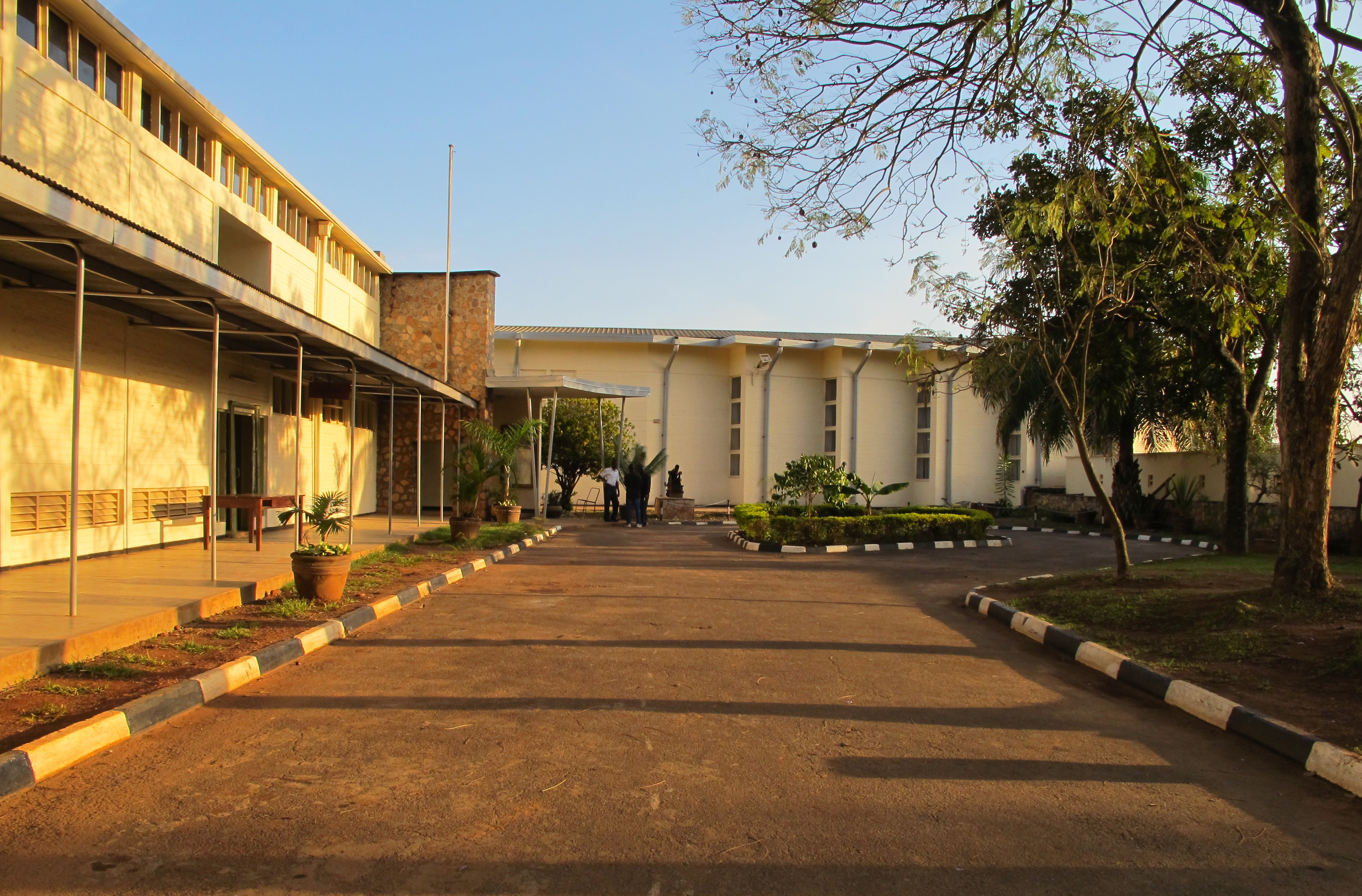
- The skyline of Kampala Bahá‘i Temple Lubiri Kasubi Tombs Uganda National Mosque Lubaga Cathedral Hamz Stadium Makerere University Uganda Museum

- Flag

- Kampala highlighted in red inside the Republic of Uganda
- Interactive map of Kampala
- Location of Kampala in Uganda Location in Africa
- Coordinates: 00°18′49″N 32°34′52″E
- Country: Uganda
- City: Kampala District

Government
  - Lord Mayor: Ronald Nsubuga
  - Executive Director: Hajjat Sharifah Buzeki

Area
  - Capital city: 189 km^{2} (73 sq mi)
  - Land: 176 km^{2} (68 sq mi)
  - Water: 13 km^{2} (5.0 sq mi)
  - Metro: 8,451.9 km^{2} (3,263.3 sq mi)
- Elevation: 1,200 m (3,900 ft)

Population (2024 census)
  - Capital city: 1,797,722
  - Rank: 1st
  - Density: 22,500/km^{2} (58,000/sq mi)
  - Metro: 6,709,900
  - Metro density: 793/km^{2} (2,050/sq mi)
- Demonyms: Munnakampala
- Time zone: UTC+03:00 (EAT)
- Website: www.kcca.go.ug

Kampala (UK: /kæmˈpɑːlə/, US: /kɑːmˈ-/) is the capital and largest city of Uganda. The city proper has a population of 1,797,722 (2024 census) and is divided into the five political divisions of Kampala Central, Kawempe, Makindye, Nakawa, and Rubaga.

Kampala's metropolitan area consists of the city proper and the neighboring Wakiso District, Mukono District, Mpigi District, Buikwe District and Luweero District. It has a rapidly growing population that is estimated at 6,709,900 people in 2019, in an area of 8,451.9 km^{2} (3,263.3 square miles). Other estimates put the size of the metropolitan area at around four million people.

In 2015, this metropolitan area generated an estimated nominal GDP of $13.8 billion (constant US dollars of 2011), which was more than half of Uganda's GDP for that year, indicating the importance of Kampala to Uganda's economy.

In 2018, Kampala was among the fastest-growing cities in Africa, with an annual population growth rate of 4.03 percent. American consulting firm Mercer has regularly ranked Kampala as East Africa's best city to live in, ahead of Nairobi and Kigali.

== Etymology ==
Kampala originally referred to only the present-day Old Kampala hill, on whose summit Fort Lugard was located, and the initial headquarters of the British colonial authorities in the soon to be Uganda Protectorate.

Before the British construction of Fort Lugard, the hill was a hunting reserve of the Kabaka (King) of Buganda and had several species of antelope, especially the impala. As a result, when the British colonial officials were allocated this hill by the then Kabaka of Buganda, they referred to it as "The Hill of the Impala".

The natives, in whose territory this British settlement was located, then translated "Hill of the Impala" as Akasozi k’empala. This was then shortened to k'empala and finally, the name ‘Kampala’ was brought to life. Kasozi means "hill", ke "of", and empala the plural of "impala". Hence the name "Kampala" came to refer to this initial British colonial settlement that would later on spread out from the occupied Old Kampala hill near the pre-existing Kibuga (capital) of the Buganda Kingdom.

== History ==
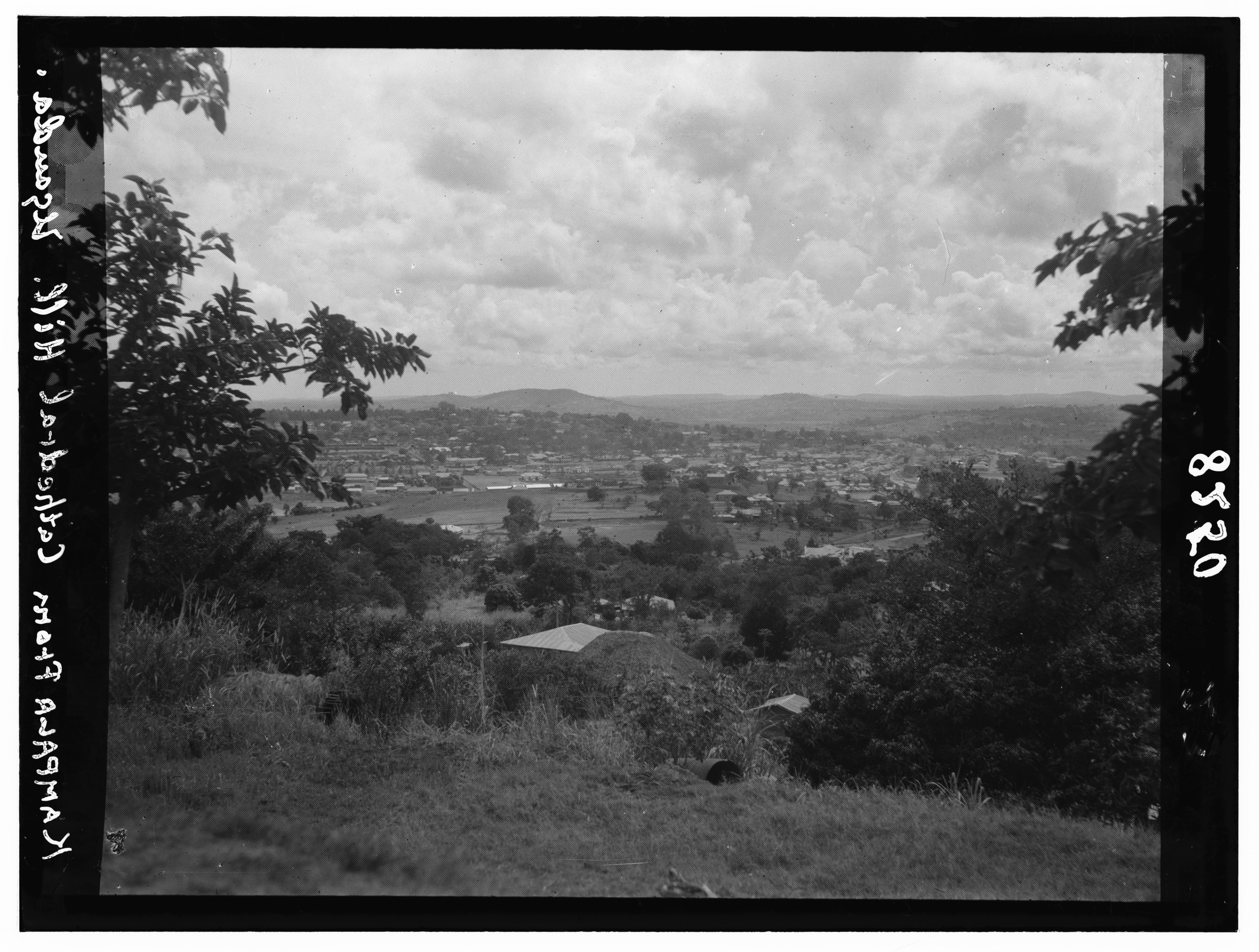
Kampala, the city from Cathedral Hill in 1936

This area of numerous hills and swamps that later become known as Kampala was part of the core of the highly centralised Buganda Kingdom. It was also the site of the shifting Kibuga (capital) of the different Bassekabaka (kings) of the Buganda Kingdom, with each Kabaka (king) upon coronation, or subsequently during their reign, setting up their Kibuga (capital) on a new or different hill as they wished or desired.

=== 19th century ===
The first written description of this Kibuga (capital) was by the explorer Sir Richard Burton in his book, The Lake Region of East Africa, published in 1860. In the book, Burton, relying on the information collected by Snay Bin Amir, an Arab trader, described the Kibuga as:

…the settlement is not less than a day's journey in length, the buildings are of cane and rattan. The sultan's (Kabaka) palace is at least a mile long and the circular huts neatly arranged in a line are surrounded by a strong fence which has only four gates.

In 1862, when explorer John Speke arrived in Buganda, the Kibuga (capital) was at Bandabarogo, present-day Banda Hill, and the reigning Kabaka (King) was Mutesa I.

In 1875, explorer Henry Morton Stanley reported the capital as being at present-day Lubaga Hill, where he met the same Kabaka, Mutesa I.

During this visit, Stanley wrote a letter that was published in The Daily Telegraph, inviting missionaries to come to Buganda. He also described the Kibuga in his 1870s dispatches to The New York Herald, thus:

As we approached the capital, the highway from Usavara [Busabala] increased in width from 20 ft [6 meters] to 150 ft [45 meters]...Arrived at the capital I found the vast collection of huts crowning the eminence were the Royal Quarters, around which ran several palisades and circular courts, between which and the city was a circular road, ranging from 100 ft [30 meters] to 200 ft [60 meters] in width with gardens and huts...

— Bennet, N.R. (ed.) Stanley's Dispatches to the New York Herald, 1871–1872, 1874–1877, Boston, 1970.

In 1877, the first missionaries from the Church Mission Society, who were of the Protestant faith, arrived from the United Kingdom and were allocated Namirembe Hill. Two years later, in 1879, the Catholic White Fathers also arrived, first settling at the present-day village of Kitebi near Lubaga; subsequently, they would be allocated Lubaga Hill. The arrival of these two missionary groups laid the ground for the religious wars of 1888 to 1892 between their new converts and forced the missionaries from Great Britain to then lobby for the British government to take over Buganda/Uganda as a protectorate.

In 1890, Frederick Lugard, an agent of the Imperial British East Africa Company, arrived in Buganda during the reign of Kabaka Mwanga II, with whom he signed a treaty of protection by the British government over Buganda, and the Kibuga (capital) was located at Mengo Hill. Captain Lugard would, later on, be allocated the Kampala hill that would soon be known as Old Kampala, and on which he built a fort.

In 1895, Mengo Senior School, the first school offering Western education in Kampala, was opened by the Church Missionary Society at Namirembe hill, where mostly the children of chiefs and pages of the royal palaces were students.

In 1897, Mwanga launched a rebellion but was defeated and was subsequently captured and exiled, in 1899, to the Seychelles alongside Omukama Kabalega, and his 3-year-old son was made Kabaka by the combined forces of the European officers leading Nubian and Baganda colonial soldiers. This state of affairs later culminated in the signing of the Buganda Agreement (1900) that formalised British colonial rule in Buganda.

Also in 1897, Kampala's first Western-style health facility, Mengo Hospital, was opened on Namirembe hill by British doctor and missionary Sir Albert Ruskin Cook. In addition, Sir Albert Ruskin Cook founded Mulago Hospital, the current National Referral Hospital, at Mulago hill in 1913.

In 1899, the Missionary Sisters of Our Lady of Africa founded Lubaga Hospital on Lubaga Hill.

=== 20th century ===
In 1900, the regents of the infant Kabaka Daudi Cwa II (who were Apolo Kagwa, the Katikiro (Prime Minister) of Buganda, Stanislaus Mugwanya, the Mulamuzi (Chief Judge) of Buganda, and Zakaria Kisingiri, the Muwanika (Chief Treasurer) of Buganda, with Bishop Alfred Tucker), signed the Buganda Agreement on behalf of Buganda with Sir Harry Johnston, who signed on behalf of the British government. This agreement with Sir Harry Johnston created new land tenures such as freehold, Crown land, and mailo, and divided up and allocated the land in such a way that would come to define the development of Kampala.

The land in Buganda's Kibuga (capital), including Mengo Hill and Makerere Hill, was allocated to the young Kabaka, the Baganda colonial collaborators, etc., under mailo and freehold. The religious missions were also formally allocated land they were previously occupying. Thus, the Catholic White Fathers got Lubaga Hill, the Protestant Church Missionary Society got Namirembe Hill, the Muslims under Prince Nuhu Mbogo's leadership received Kibuli Hill, the British Catholic Mill Hill Missionaries received most of Nsambya Hill. The Uganda Protectorate government obtained land classified as Crown lands in the area such as Old Kampala Hill, Nakasero Hill, etc.

To legalise the above changes, the following laws and ordinances were subsequently passed: The Crown lands Ordinance of 1903, The Land Law of 1908, The Registration of Land Titles ordinance of 1922, and the Busulu and Envujo law of 1928.

In 1906, the boundary of Kampala was set as a three-mile radius from the “present Nakasero Fort” at Old Kampala, and the Kampala Local Sanitary Board was designated as the authority for urban administration in the Kampala Township Area. By the time of Kampala Township's first planning scheme in 1912, the area covered by the plan was about 1,400 acres (567 ha).

In 1912, Kampala Township received its first land-use plan and had a European and Asian population of 2,850.

In 1922, Kampala's oldest university, Makerere, was founded as the Uganda Technical College at the present Makerere Hill and initially offered carpentry, building construction, mechanics, arts, education, agriculture, and medicine.

In 1930, the first sewerage plan was prepared to target a population of 20,000 people in the Nakasero and Old Kampala areas of the Kampala township. This plan guided sewerage development from 1936 to 1940 in planned urban areas of the Kampala Township and excluded the Kibuga area occupied by the Baganda and other natives.

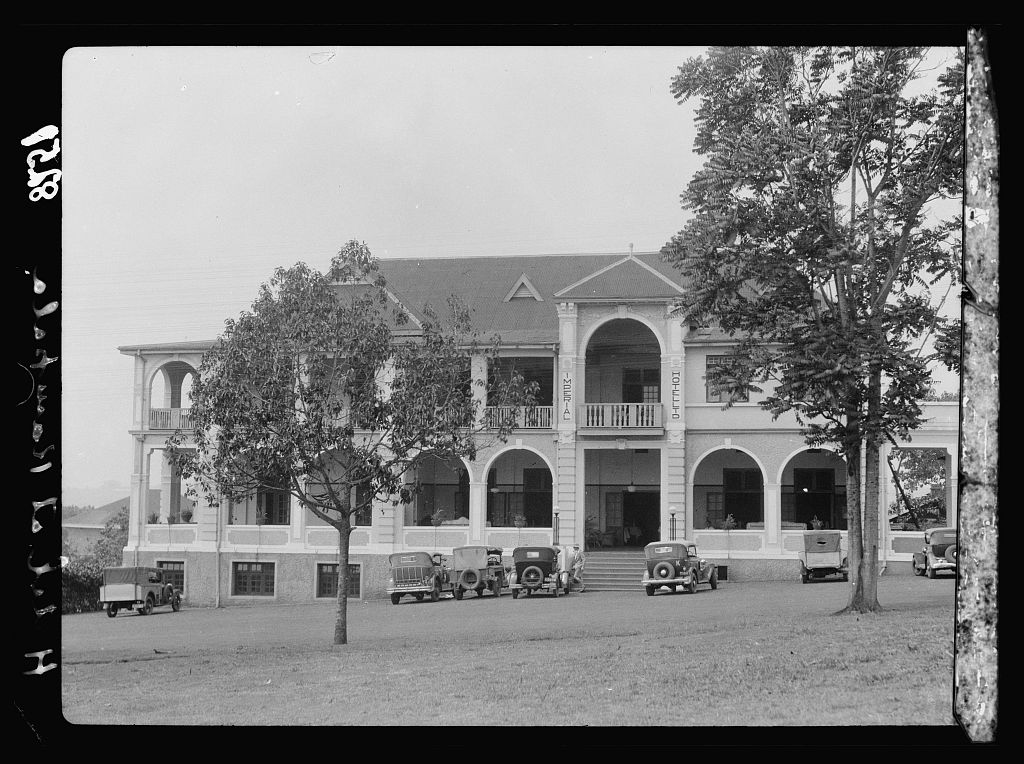
Kampala. The Imperial Hotel in 1936.

In 1931, the Uganda Railway line reached Kampala, connecting Kampala to Mombasa Port, thirty-five years after the commencement of its construction.

In 1938, The East African Power & Lighting Company was granted a licence for thermal electric power generation and distribution for the towns of Kampala and Entebbe, and in the same year Sir Philip Mitchel, the Governor of Uganda, switched on Kampala and Uganda's first electric street lights.

In 1945, Ernst May, a German architect, was commissioned by the Uganda Protectorate Government to design a new physical plan for Kampala. Ernst May's plan of 1947 was intended to extend Kampala eastwards covering Kololo Hill and Naguru Hill, and with the commercial centre on the southern slopes of Nakasero Hill, an industrial zone in the southeast of Kampala, and, for the first time, a planned residential zone for the Ugandan natives. The plan was never fully implemented, and in 1951 the third physical plan by Henry Kendall was instead adopted, though it incorporated some elements of Ernst May's 1947 plan.

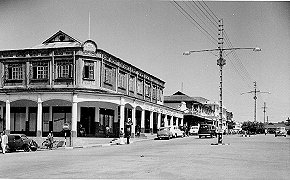
Kampala in the 1950s

Henry Kendall's 1951 plan expanded Kampala from the 5.67 km^{2} (2.19 square miles) area of the 1930 plan to an area of 28 km^{2} (11 square miles) incorporating areas like Kololo Hill, and the Industrial Area. However, like the first two planning schemes, the 1951 plan failed to achieve many of its stated objectives.

On 9 October 1962, Uganda gained independence; subsequently the capital city was transferred from Entebbe to Kampala and in the same year, Kampala was granted city status.

In 1968, six years after Uganda attained independence, the boundaries of Kampala were expanded incorporating the Kibuga (then known as Mengo Municipality), Kawempe and Nakawa Townships, and areas including Muyenga and Ggaba. This increased the administrative area of Kampala from 28 km^{2} (11 square miles) to the current 189 km^{2} (73 square miles).

In 1972, the fourth physical plan for Kampala was made covering the newly incorporated areas of Kampala's boundary extensions of 1968, but the subsequent political and economic turmoil of the 1970s and 1980s meant the plan was never implemented.

The Battle of Kampala during the Ugandan Bush War occurred in January 1986. It resulted in the capture of the city by the National Resistance Movement, led by Yoweri Museveni and the subsequent surrender of the Ugandan government.

Similarly, the fifth physical plan for Kampala, made in 1994, like the 1972 plan, was also never implemented.

=== 21st century ===
In 2010, the Kampala Capital City Authority Act was enacted, giving the Ugandan Government more control of the administration of Kampala. The act also created the Kampala Metropolitan Physical Planning Authority with the stated aims of improving the infrastructure of the City of Kampala and the surrounding districts of Wakiso, Mukono, Buikwe, Mpigi and Luwero.

On 11 July 2010, suicide bombers affiliated with al-Shabaab, a Sunni Islamist group based in Somalia, carried out two nearly simultaneous bombings in Kampala, killing 74 people. After eleven years of relative calm, on 16 November 2021, the Allied Democratic Forces (ADF), an Islamist group based in eastern Congo with ties to the Islamic State, carried out two suicide bombings near the central police station and parliament, killing three people and injuring 36.

== Geography ==
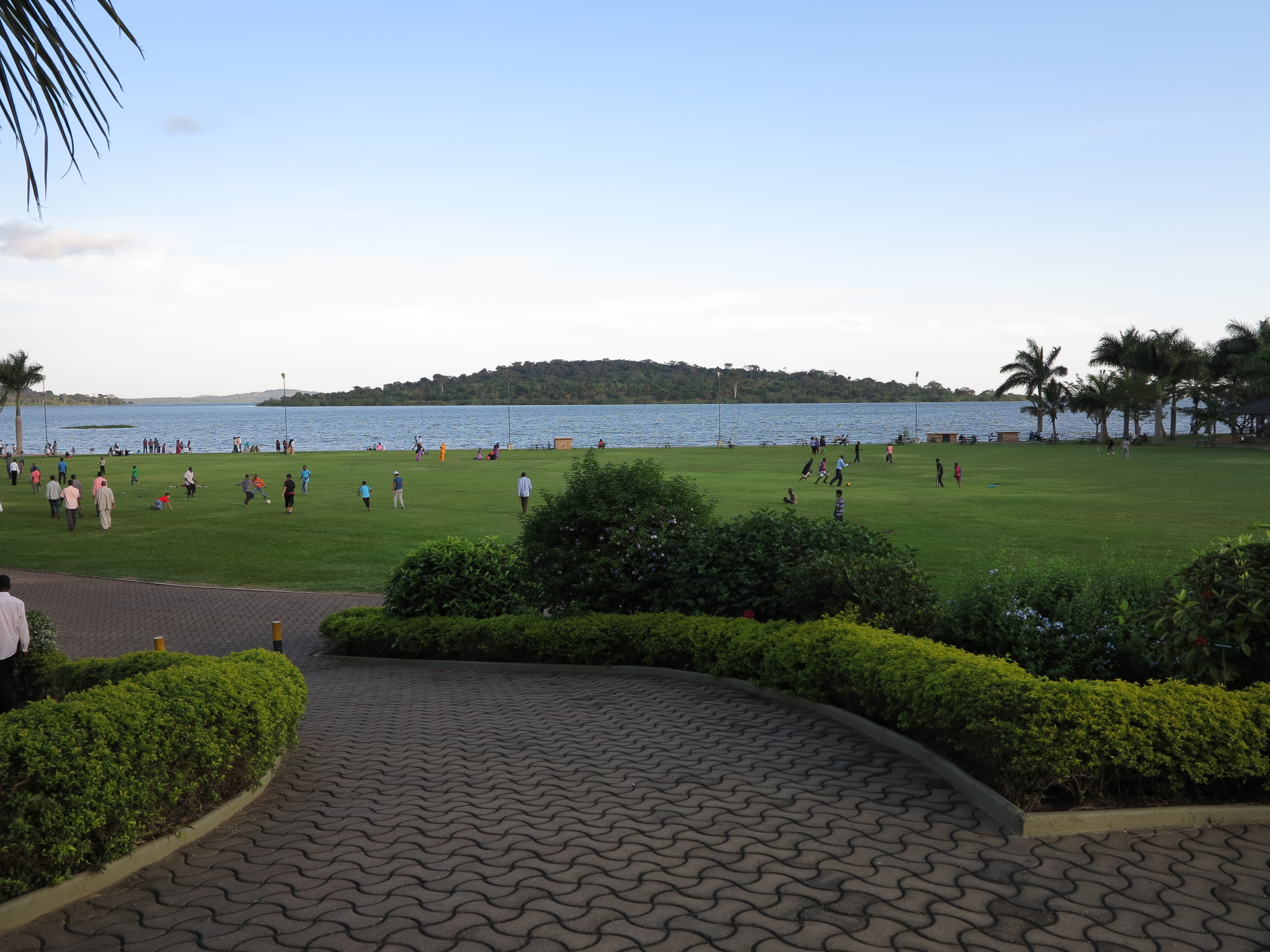
Lake Victoria

=== Topography ===
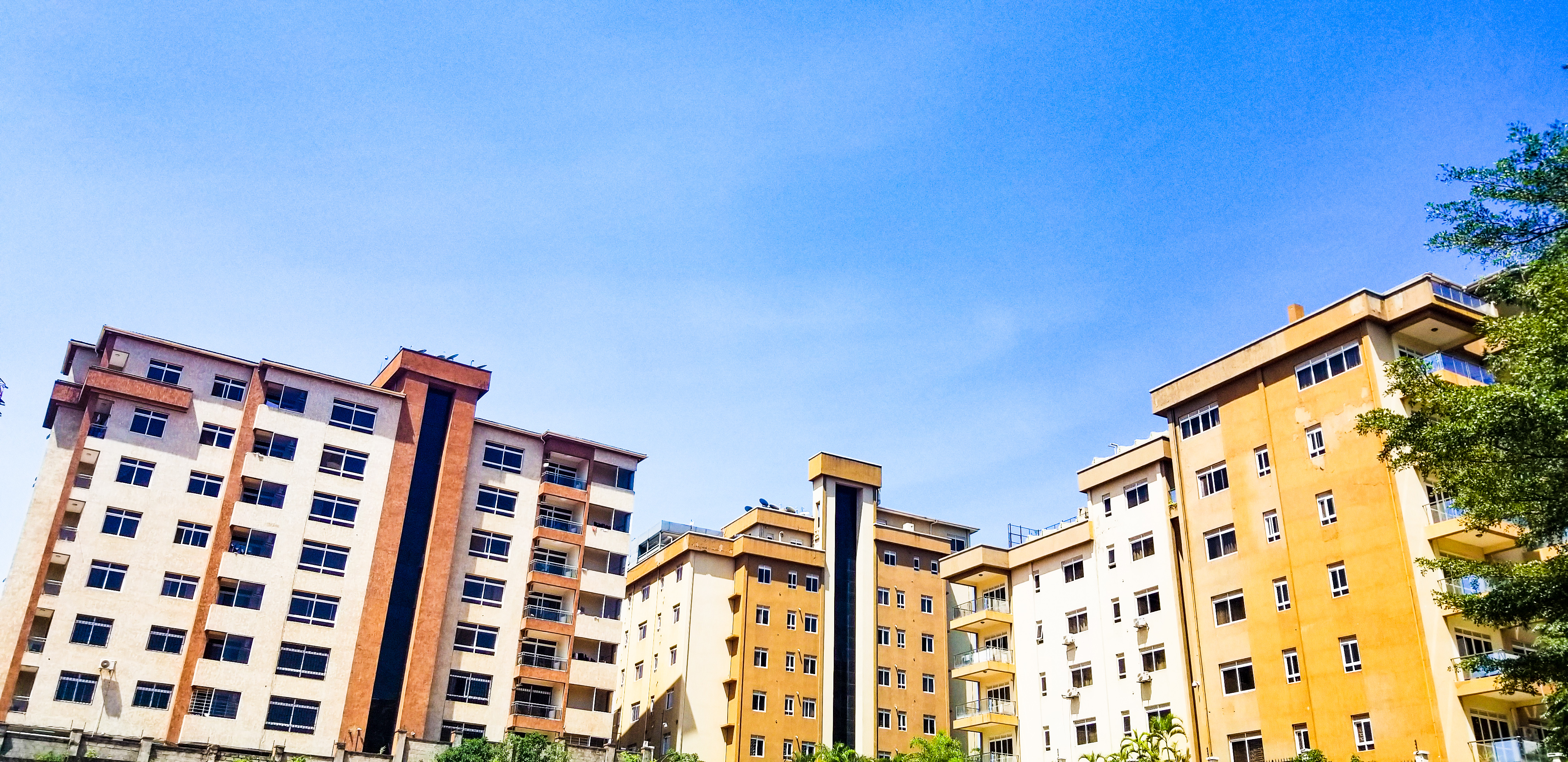
An apartment block in Kololo

The City of Kampala covers a total area of 189 km^{2} (73 square miles), comprising 176 km^{2} (68 square miles) of land and 13 km^{2} (5.0 square miles) of water.

Kampala is a hilly place with its valleys filled with sluggish rivers, lakes /swamps. The highest point in the city proper is the summit of Kololo hill at 1,311 metres (4,301 ft), located in the centre of the city and the lowest point at the shores of Lake Victoria south of the city centre at altitude of 1,135 metres (3,724 ft).

==== Hills ====
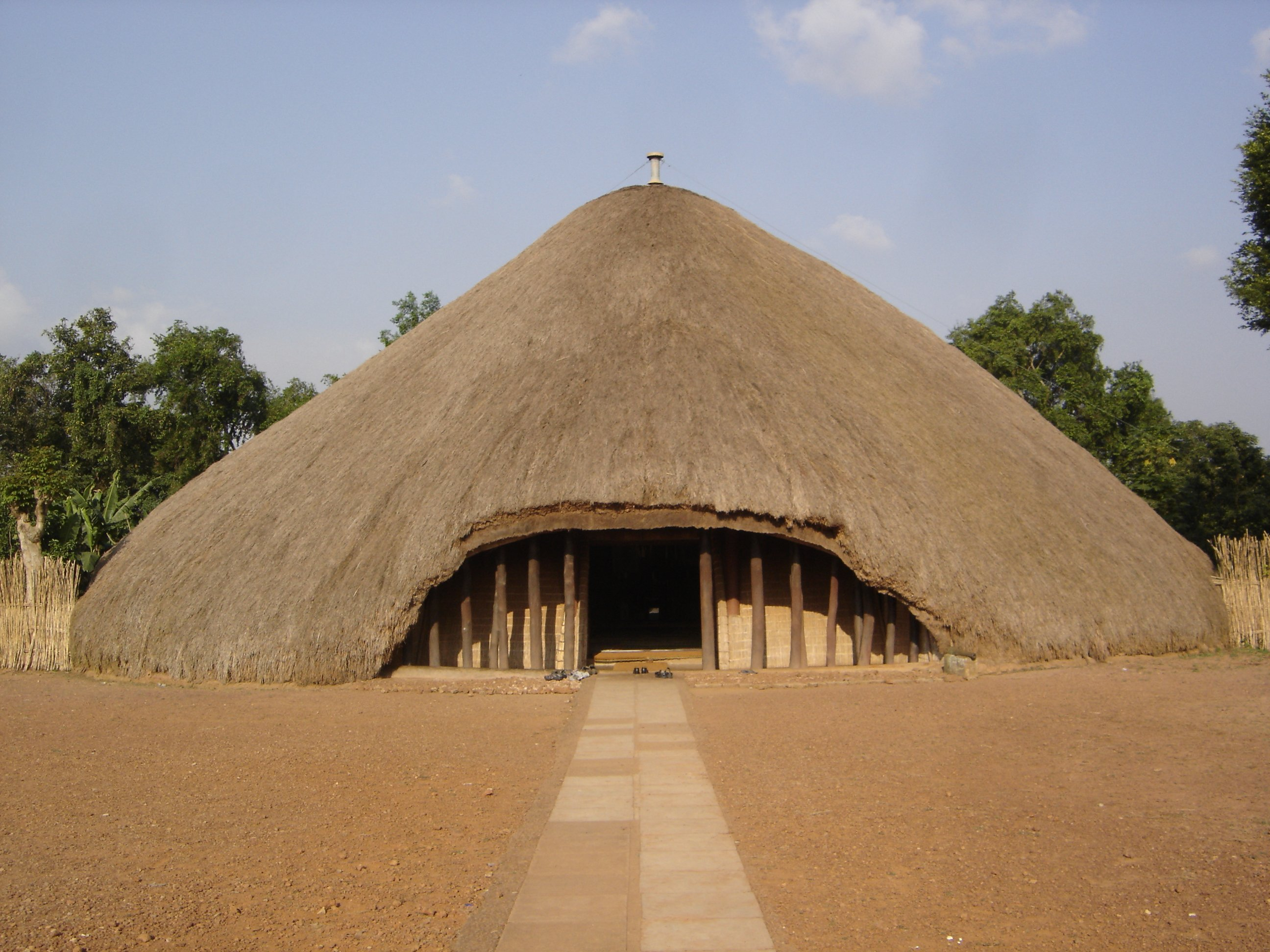
The Kasubi Tombs

Kampala was originally built on seven hills, but it has expanded to cover more than the original seven hills.

The original seven hills are:

- Old Kampala Hill on which Fort Lugard was located, the first seat of the British colonial authorities in colonial Uganda.
- The second is Mengo Hill which was the then kibuga (capital) of Buganda kingdom at the start of British colonial rule.
- The third is Kibuli Hill, that is home to the Kibuli Mosque.
- The fourth is Namirembe Hill, that was home to the Anglican (Wangeleza) faction of the Buganda religious wars of 1888 to 1892 and site of Namirembe Anglican Cathedral.
- The fifth is Lubaga Hill, that was home to the White Fathers Catholic (Wafaransa) faction of the above-mentioned Buganda religious wars and also site of the Rubaga Catholic Cathedral.
- The sixth is Nsambya Hill, site of the former Cathedral of St Peter's Nsambya and allocated to the British Catholic Mill Hill Mission during the signing of the Uganda Agreement (1900).
- The seventh is Nakasero Hill on whose summit was Fort Nakasero, a British military installation built after relocating from Fort Lugard in Old Kampala. The hill was also the site of the European Hospital (the current government analytical laboratory opposite Ministry of Public Service headquarters).

==== Swamps and slow rivers ====
Due to Kampala's hilly nature and tropical climate, the valleys have slow rivers and swamps that tend to flow southwards towards Lake Victoria or northwards. These swamps cover 15% of Kampala's land area. They include:

- Kinawataka swamp river covering an area of 1.5 km^{2} (0.58 square miles) flowing southwards into Lake Victoria and is located in Nakawa Division.
- Nakivubo swamp river covering an area of 5.29 km^{2} (2.04 square miles) flowing southwards to Lake Victoria from the foothills of Makerere and of length 9 kilometres (5.6 mi).
- Lubigi swamp covering an area of 2.85 km^{2} (1.10 square miles) flowing westwards from the foothills of Kisaasi into the Mayanja River.
- Kansanga swamp
- Kyetinda swamp

=== Vegetation ===
Kampala, due to the diversity of habitats that include wetlands and hills, was previously covered with short grasses on the tops of the hills, elephant grass (Pennisetum purpureum Schumach.), Cyperus papyrus, African water lily etc. in the swamps and evergreen forests with trees such as African olive (mpafu) and Natal fig (mutuba).

=== Geology ===
Kampala is located on the East African Plateau between the two arms of the East African Rift and on the northern limits of Tanzania Craton.

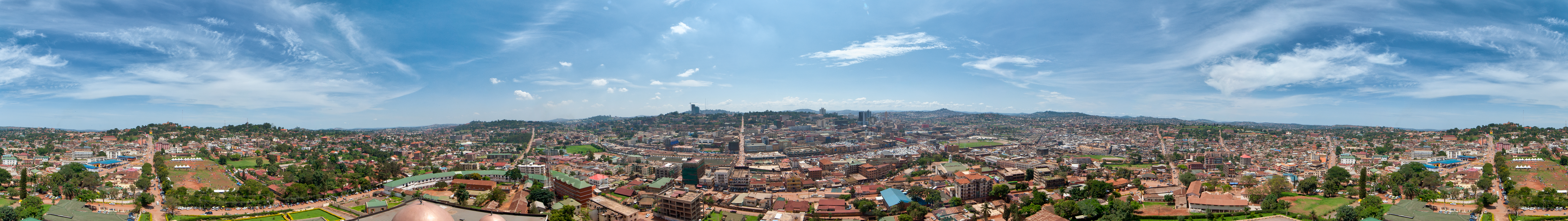
360-degree Kampala City panorama from the Old Gaddafi Mosque

=== Climate ===
Kampala has a tropical rainforest climate (Af) under the Köppen-Geiger climate classification system.

Kampala has two annual wetter seasons. While the city does not have a true dry season month, it has heavier precipitation from August to December and from February to June. Between February and June Kampala has substantially heavier rainfall per month. April has the heaviest amount of precipitation, at an average of around 169 millimetres (6.7 in) of rain.

Climate data for Kampala (Makerere University) (1991–2020 normals, extremes 1950–present)
Month	Jan	Feb	Mar	Apr	May	Jun	Jul	Aug	Sep	Oct	Nov	Dec	Year
Record high °C (°F)	33.3 (91.9)	34.4 (93.9)	33.1 (91.6)	32.2 (90.0)	29.5 (85.1)	29.3 (84.7)	29.0 (84.2)	29.4 (84.9)	31.0 (87.8)	31.7 (89.1)	31.4 (88.5)	32.0 (89.6)	34.4 (93.9)
Mean daily maximum °C (°F)	28.3 (82.9)	28.6 (83.5)	27.8 (82.0)	26.2 (79.2)	25.8 (78.4)	25.7 (78.3)	25.4 (77.7)	25.9 (78.6)	26.8 (80.2)	27.1 (80.8)	26.9 (80.4)	27.4 (81.3)	26.8 (80.2)
Daily mean °C (°F)	22.0 (71.6)	22.5 (72.5)	22.3 (72.1)	21.8 (71.2)	21.5 (70.7)	21.2 (70.2)	20.7 (69.3)	20.8 (69.4)	21.4 (70.5)	21.6 (70.9)	21.7 (71.1)	21.9 (71.4)	21.6 (70.9)
Mean daily minimum °C (°F)	17.1 (62.8)	17.5 (63.5)	17.4 (63.3)	17.1 (62.8)	16.9 (62.4)	16.5 (61.7)	16.1 (61.0)	16.0 (60.8)	16.3 (61.3)	16.6 (61.9)	16.8 (62.2)	16.9 (62.4)	16.8 (62.2)
Record low °C (°F)	12.2 (54.0)	12.8 (55.0)	13.0 (55.4)	12.8 (55.0)	13.3 (55.9)	12.0 (53.6)	11.5 (52.7)	11.7 (53.1)	12.4 (54.3)	12.5 (54.5)	12.5 (54.5)	11.5 (52.7)	11.5 (52.7)
Average rainfall mm (inches)	46.2 (1.82)	61.4 (2.42)	131.3 (5.17)	169.0 (6.65)	137.5 (5.41)	65.8 (2.59)	43.3 (1.70)	86.2 (3.39)	108.4 (4.27)	121.1 (4.77)	139.7 (5.50)	94.6 (3.72)	1,204.5 (47.41)
Average rainy days (≥ 1.0 mm)	4.8	5.3	9.8	12.4	10.9	5.2	3.8	6.5	8.9	10.3	11.8	8.1	97.8
Average relative humidity (%)	66	68.5	73	78.5	80.5	78.5	77.5	77.5	75.5	73.5	73	71.5	74.5
Mean monthly sunshine hours	155	170	155	120	124	180	186	155	150	155	150	124	1,824
Source 1: World Meteorological Organization
Source 2: BBC Weather

== Education ==
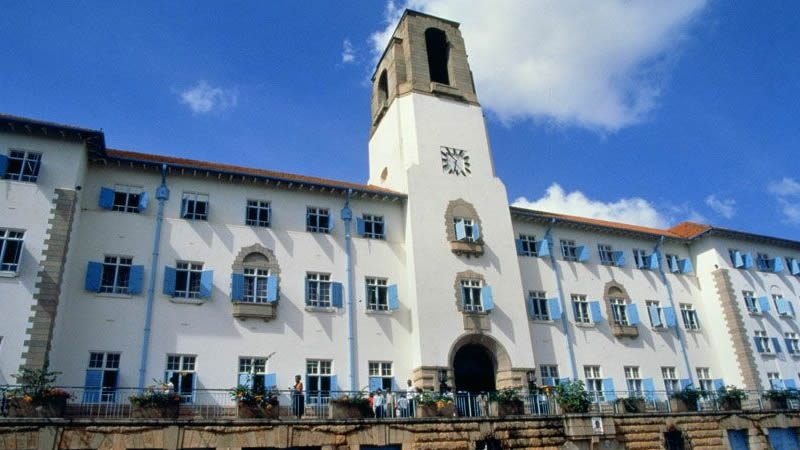
Makerere University

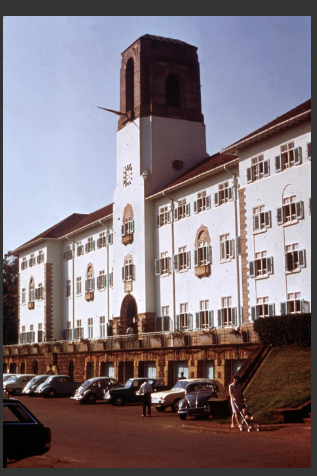
Makerere University Main building in the pre-independence years

Pre-primary education

Pre-primary education is offered only by private entities which are located in the various neighbourhoods of Kampala and is lightly regulated by the Ministry of Education and Sports and starts from age of 6 weeks. Education in Kampala city is provided by a vast number of public and private institutions offering a wide range of educational training that includes pre-primary, primary, secondary, vocational, technical undergraduate and post-graduate education.

Primary and secondary education in Kampala

Kampala has a number of both primary and secondary schools in every parish that are mostly privately owned and a handful that are state-owned and are also lightly regulated by the City Education directorate and Ministry of Education and Sports.

Some of the private institutions:

- Kampala Parents School
- Aga Khan School
- Gayaza High School
- Good Times Primary School
- Global Junior School
- Kawempe Muslim secondary school

Vocational and technical education in Kampala

Kampala has a number of both private and state institutions offering training in a broad range of fields as indicated in the table below:

Vocation/technical institution	Speciality	Location	Ownership	Est
Nakawa Vocational Training Institute	Electricity/electronic; Automotive/auto – electrical; Brick/block laying and concrete practice; Welding and fabrication; Sheet metal and plumbing; Wood working; Machining and Fitting	Nakawa	State owned	1971
Tiner International School of Beauty	Hairdressing; Beauty therapy	Wandegeya	Private	1995
Jimmy Sekasi Institute of Catering	Food and beverage	Kabalagala	Private	1989
St Mbaaga Major Seminary	Theology	Ggaba	Private	1976

The city is also home to various public and private universities in the country including Makerere University, Kyambogo University, Kampala University, African Bible University, International University of East Africa, Ndejje University and many others.

== Demographics ==
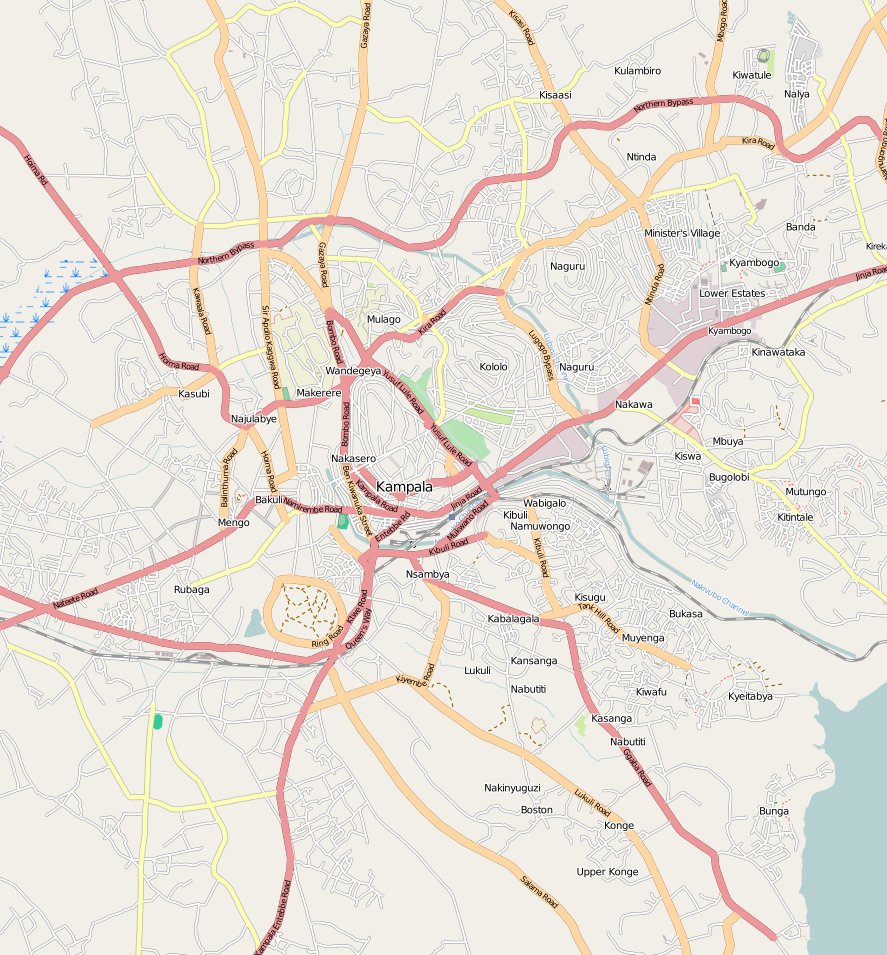
A street map of Kampala

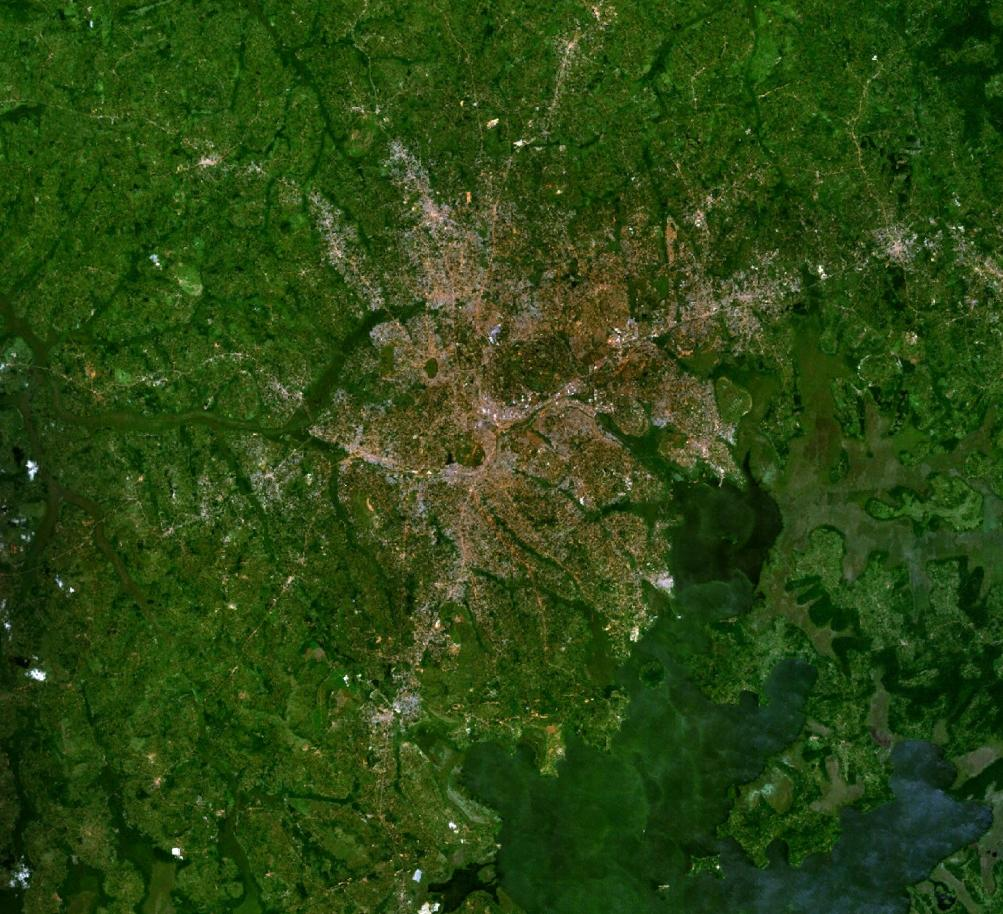
A view of Kampala from space, 2005

The population of Kampala city proper has grown from 62,264 in 1948, to 1,189,142 in 2002, then 1,507,080 in 2014. In 2019, the population was estimated to be 1,650,800.

In 2024, Kampala had 1,797,722 residents, consisting of 1,004,884 males and 792,838 females. The average household size was 2.9 persons.

Kampala, being the capital city and economic engine of Uganda, has a diverse ethnic population drawn from all parts of the country and also from neighbouring countries such as Democratic Republic of the Congo, Rwanda, South Sudan, Eritrea, Somalia, and even from countries as far away as India and China.

Cross-cultural intimate relations in Kampala and even Uganda as a whole is still unusual. Although many of Kampala's residents live and work in close contact, they still define themselves by their ethnic origins. This is more evident in the native languages (alongside Luganda and English) that are used at home, workplaces, and public spaces. In addition to the Baganda and Banyankole, other large ethnic groups include the Basoga, Bafumbira, Batoro, Bakiga, Alur, Bagisu (better known as Bamasaba), Banyoro, Iteso, Langi, and Acholi.

Historical population data for Kampala

Year	1948	1959	1969	1980	1991	2002	2014	2019	2024
Kampala (city proper)	62,264	107,058	330,700	458,503	774,241	1,189,142	1,507,080	1,650,800	1,797,722

=== Religion ===
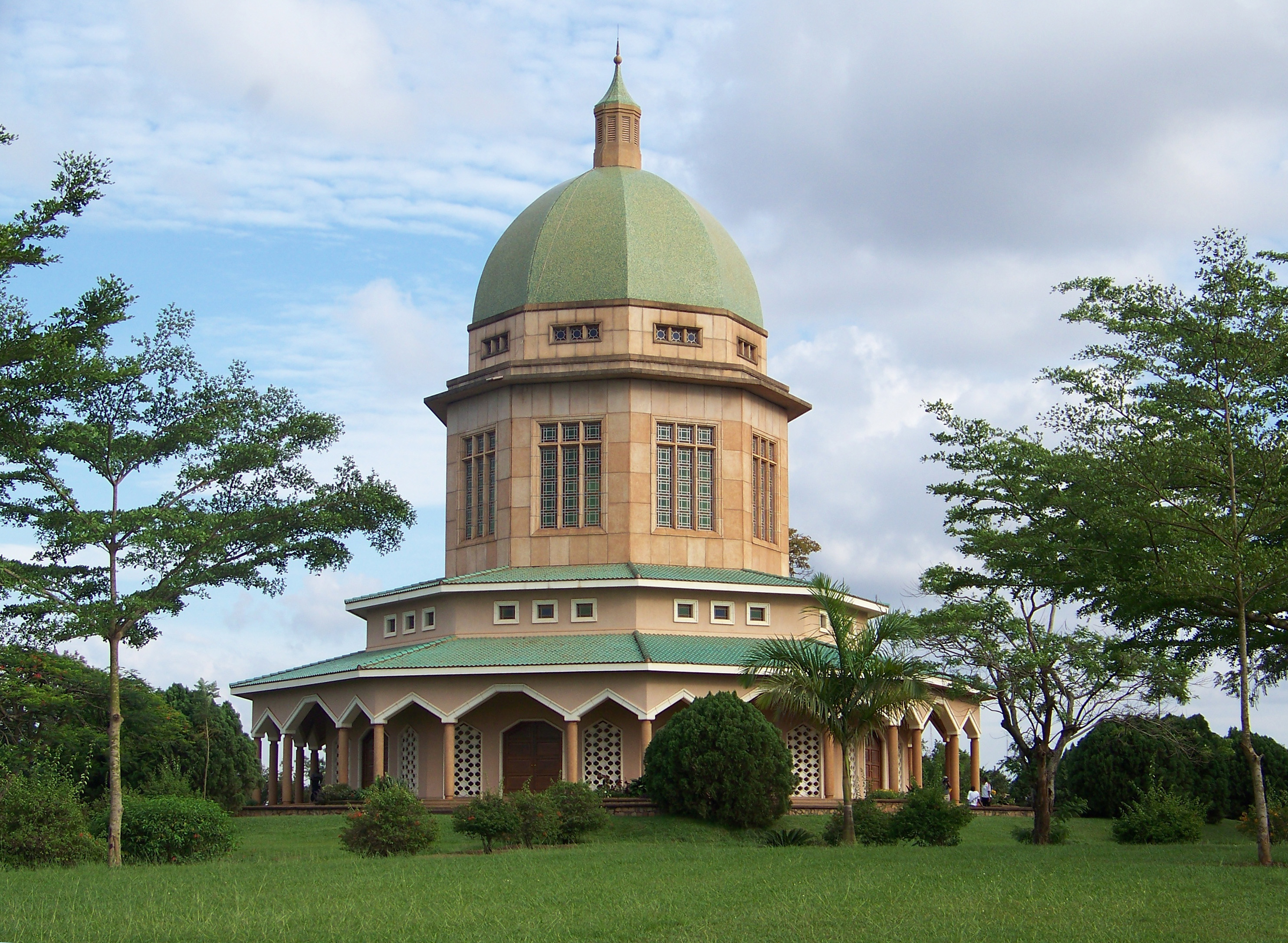
Baháʼí House of Worship in Kampala

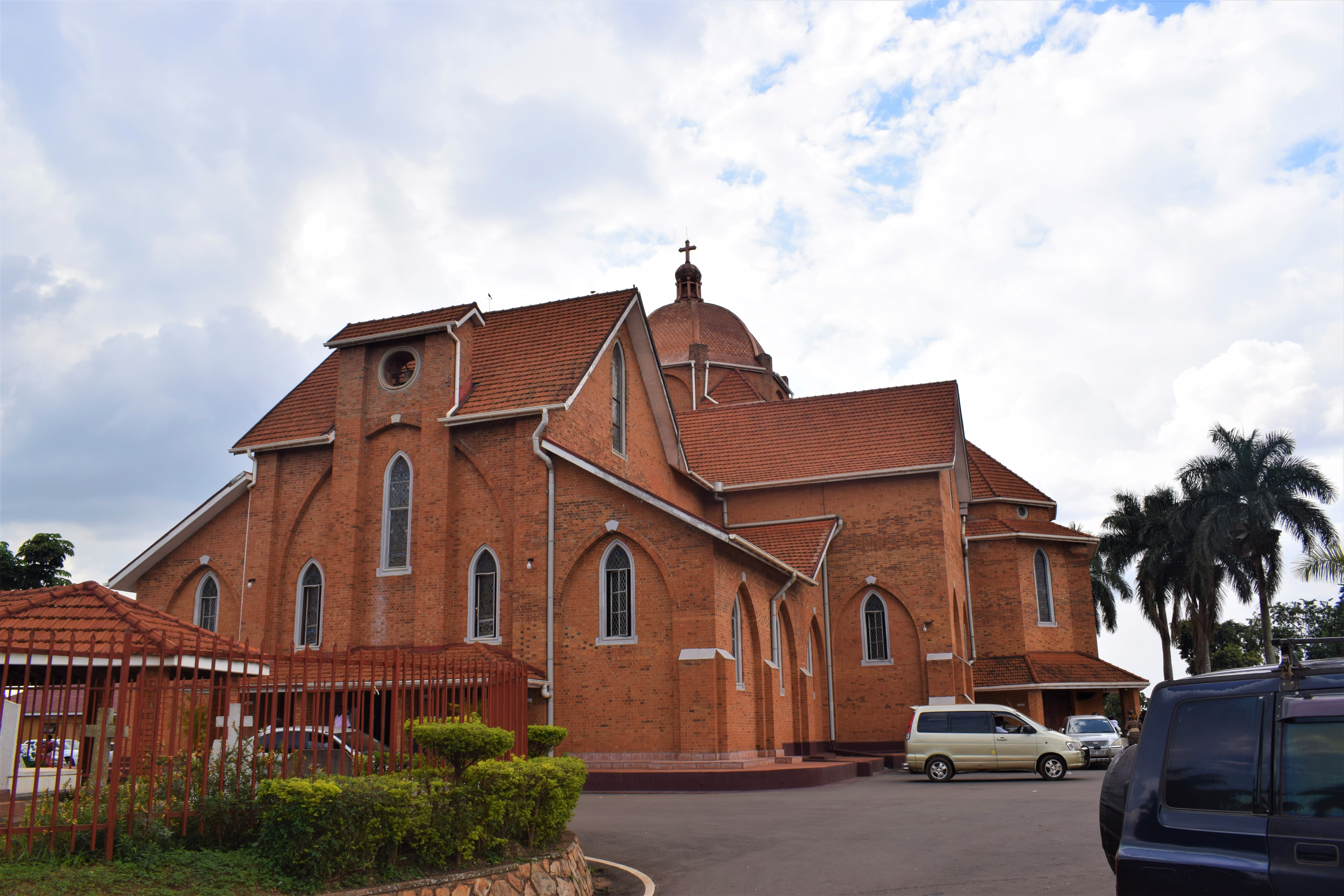
St. Paul's Anglican Cathedral located on Namirembe Hill

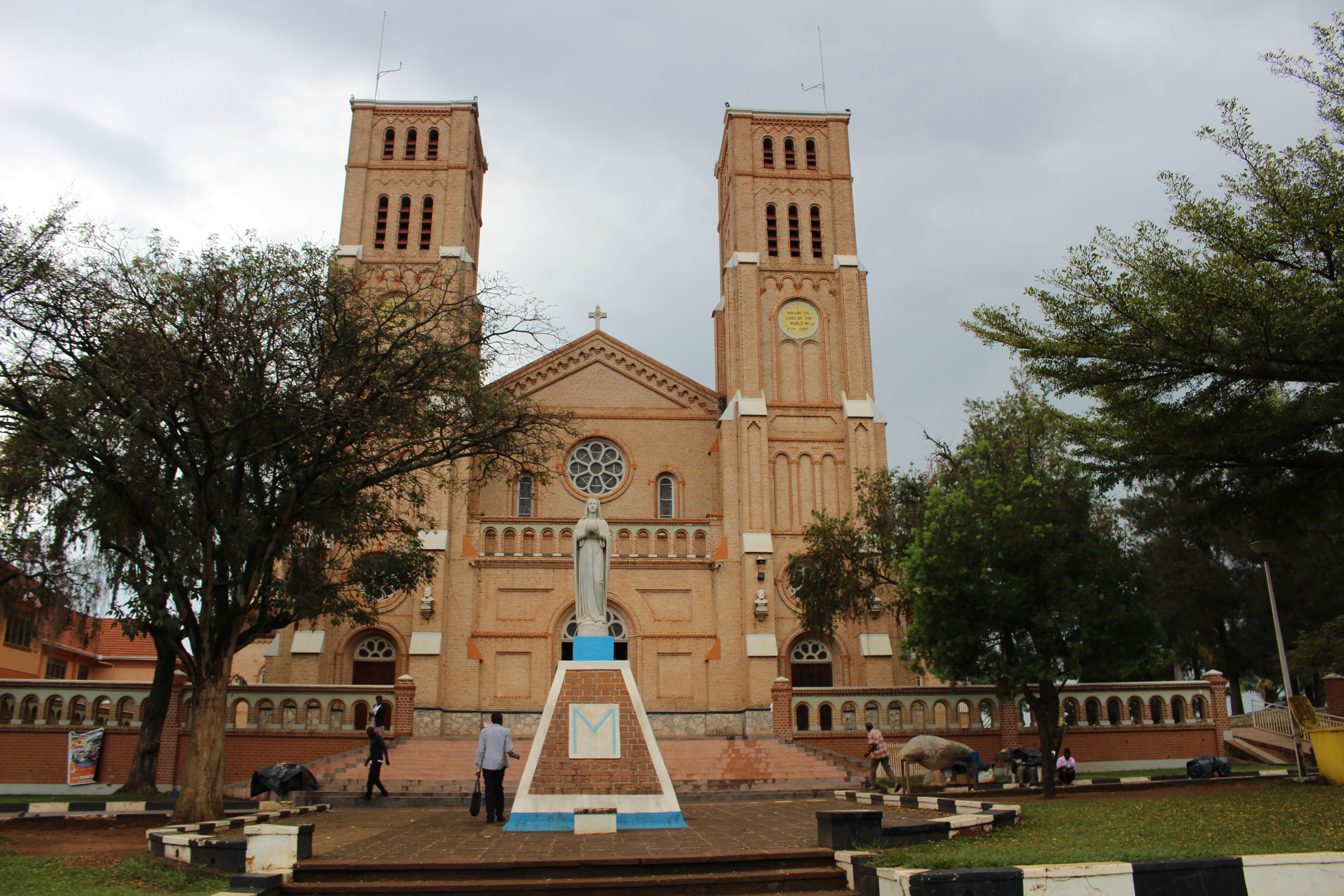
Rubaga Cathedral, the seat for the Roman Catholic Church

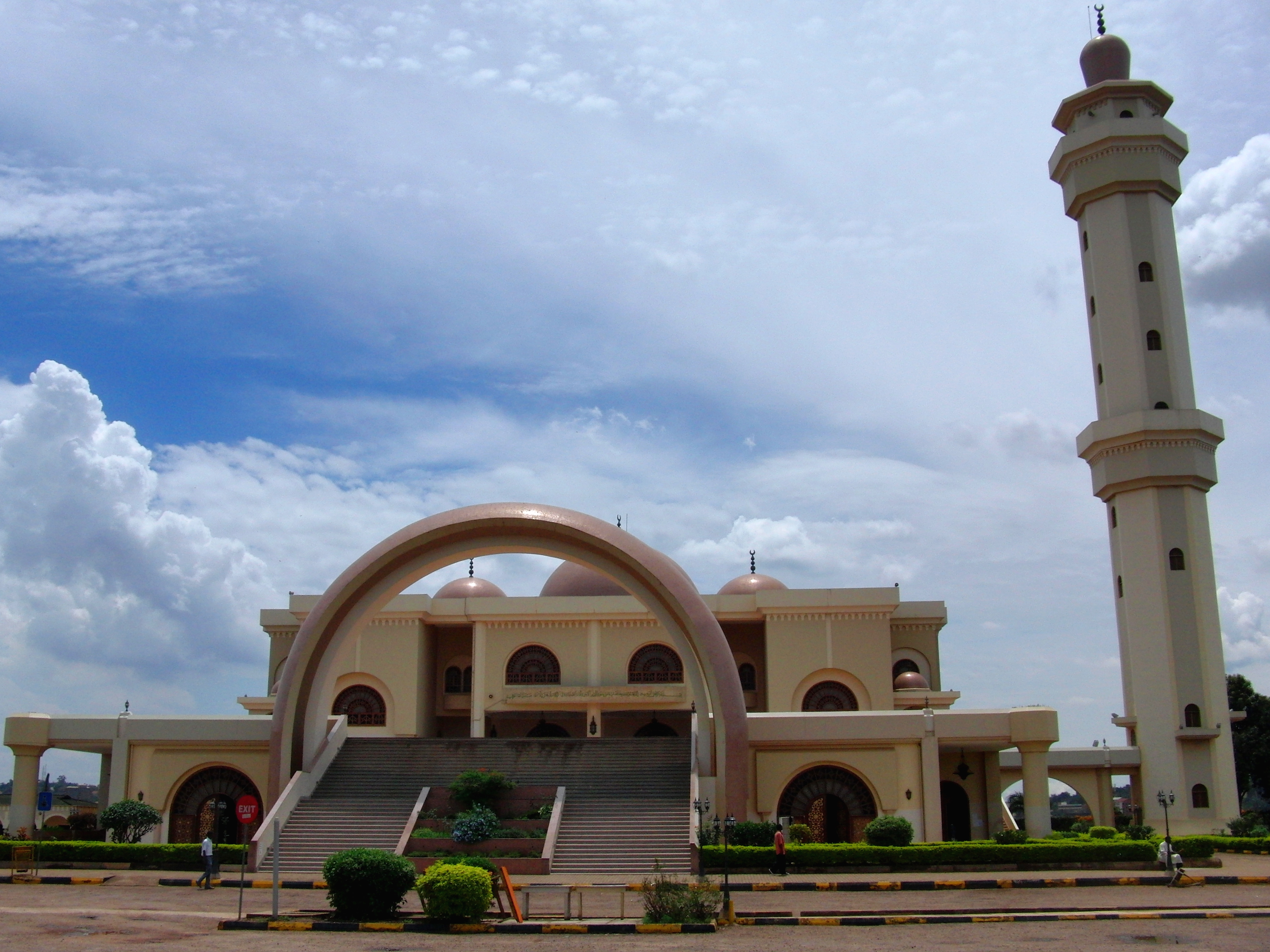
Uganda National Mosque (Islam)

Among the places of worship are predominantly Christian churches and temples: Roman Catholic Archdiocese of Kampala (Catholic Church), Church of Uganda (Anglican Communion), Presbyterian Church in Uganda (World Communion of Reformed Churches), Baptist Union of Uganda (Baptist World Alliance), and Assemblies of God. There are also Muslim mosques.

Kampala hosts a Bahá'í House of Worship known as the Mother Temple of Africa which is situated on Kikaya Hill in the outskirts of the city. The temple was inaugurated in January 1961.

== Economy ==
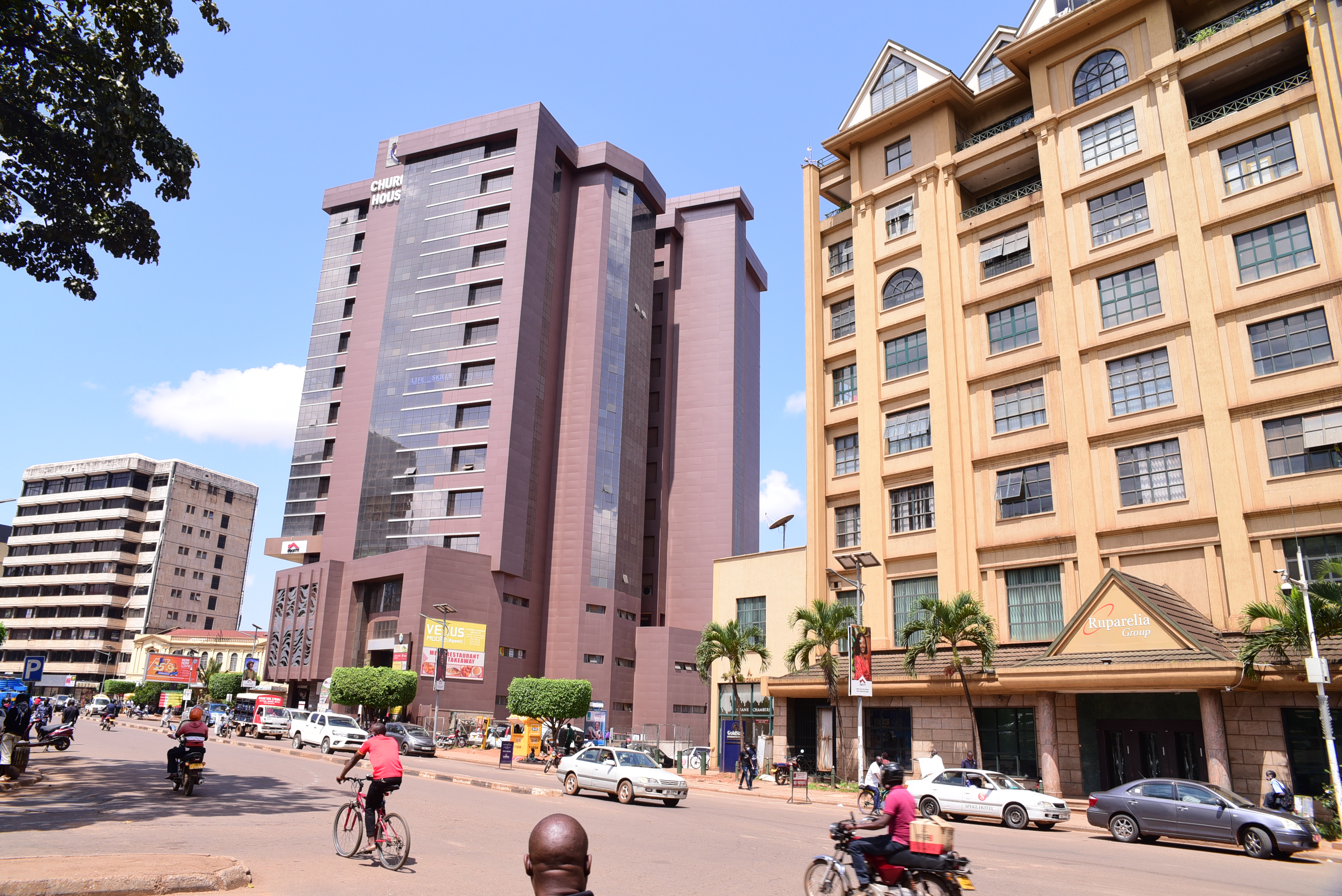
The Church House, downtown Kampala

Efforts are underway to relocate heavy industry to the Kampala Business and Industrial Park, located in Namanve, Mukono District, approximately 14 kilometres (8.7 mi) east of the city's central business district, thereby cutting down on city traffic congestion. Some of the businesses that maintain their headquarters in the city centre include all of the 25 commercial banks licensed in Uganda; the New Vision Group, the leading news media conglomerate and majority owned by the government; and the Daily Monitor publication, a member of the Kenya-based Nation Media Group. Air Uganda maintained its headquarters in an office complex on Kololo Hill in Kampala.

Crown Beverages Limited, the sole Pepsi-Cola franchise bottler in Uganda, is situated in Nakawa, a division of Kampala, about 5 kilometres (3 mi) east of the city centre.

The informal sector is a large contributor to Kampala's GDP. Citizens who work in the formal sector also participate in informal activities to earn more income for their families. A public servant in Kampala, for example, may engage in agriculture in addition to working in the formal sector. Other informal fields include owning taxis and urban agriculture. The use of Kampala's wetlands for urban farming has increased over the past few decades. It connects the informal rural settlements with the more industrialized parts of the city. The produce grown in the wetlands is sold in markets in the urban areas.

In December 2015, Google launched its first Wi-Fi network in Kampala.

While more than 30 percent of Kampala's inhabitants practice urban agriculture, the city of Kampala donated 13 hectares (32 acres) to promote urban agriculture in the northeastern parish of Kyanja, in Nakawa Division.

== Transport ==
Kampala is served by Entebbe International Airport, which is the largest airport in Uganda.

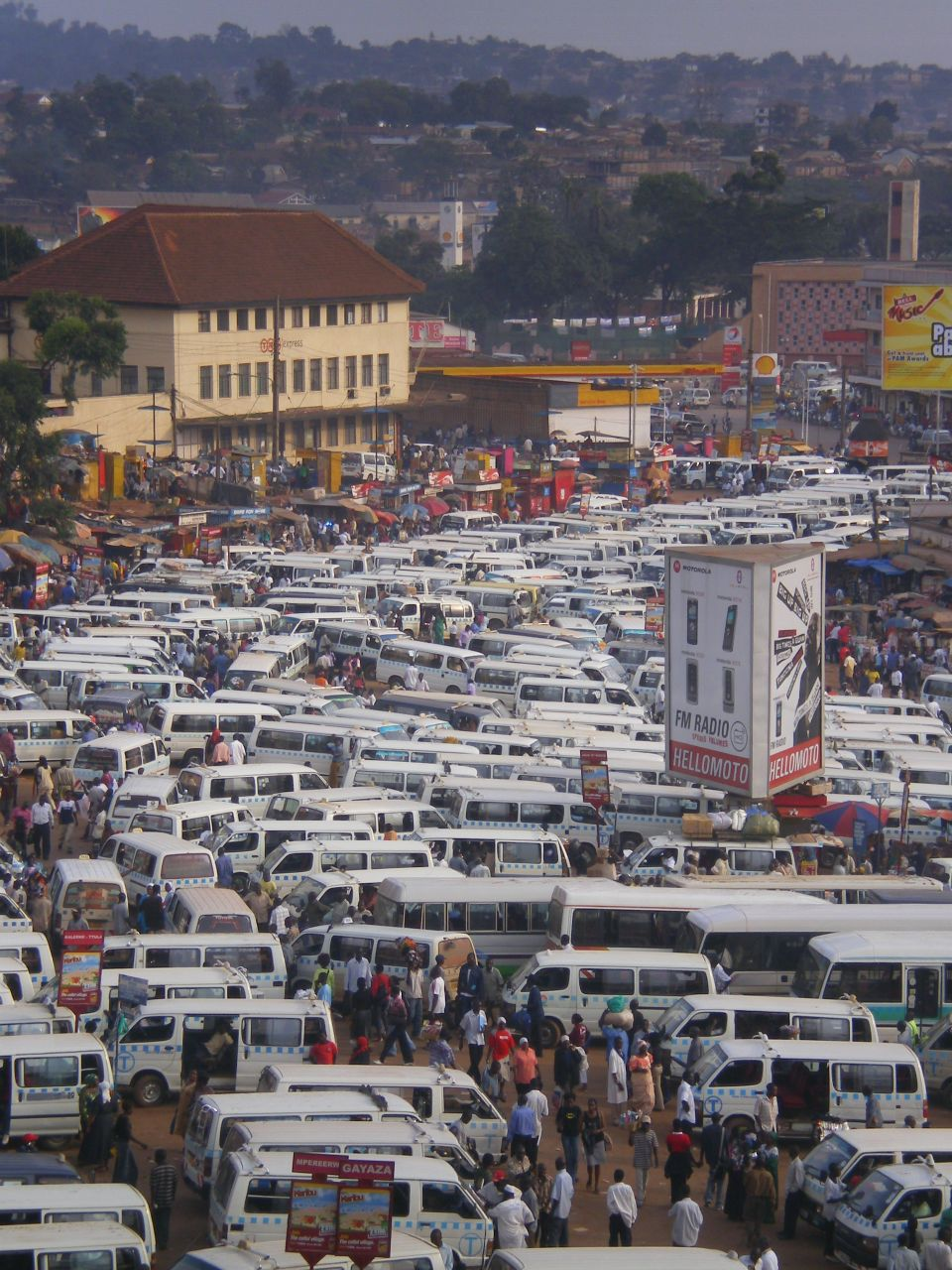
Taxi station in Kampala

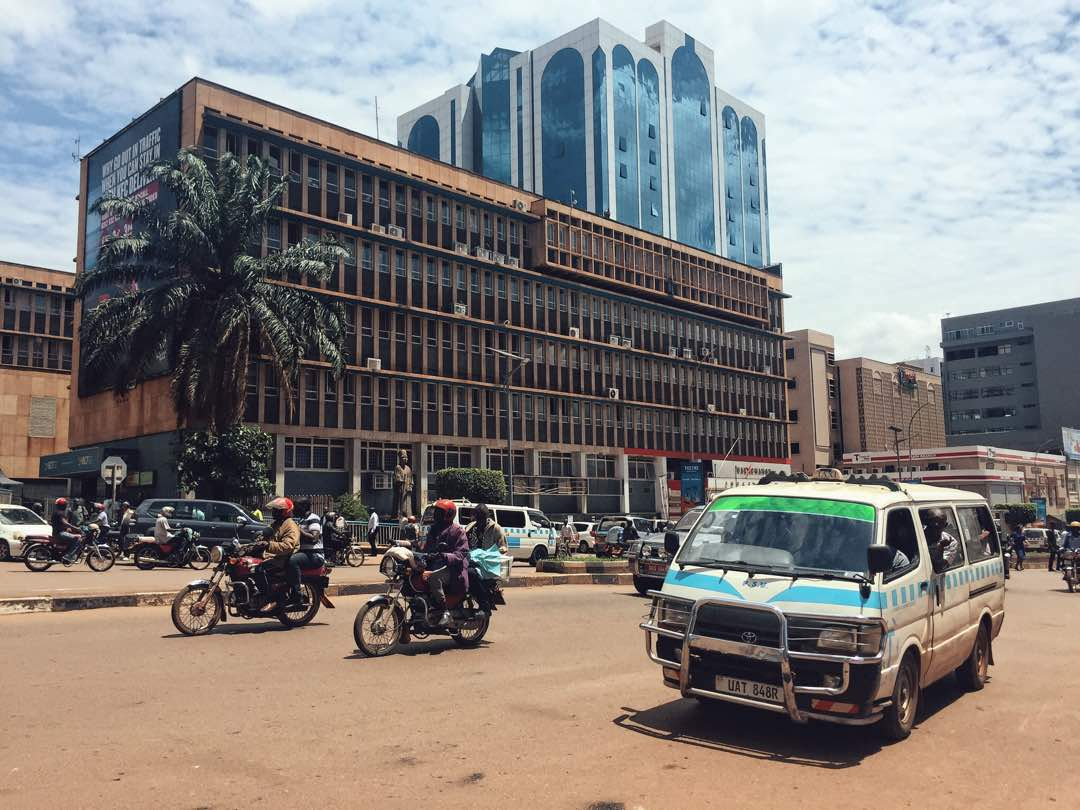
Bodaboda in Kampala

Boda-bodas (local motorbike transport) are a popular mode of transport that gives access to many areas within and outside the city. Standard fees for these range from USh:1,000 to 2,000 or more. Boda-bodas are useful for passing through rush-hour traffic, although many are poorly maintained and dangerous.

In early 2007, it was announced that Kampala would remove commuter taxis from its streets and replace them with a comprehensive city bus service. In Kampala, the term "taxi" refers to a 15-seater minibus used as public transport. The bus service was expected to cover the greater Kampala metropolitan area including Mukono, Mpigi, Bombo, Entebbe, Wakiso and Gayaza. As of December 2011 the service had not yet started.

Having successfully completed the Northern Bypass, the government, in collaboration with its stakeholders, now plans to introduce the bus rapid transit (BRT) system in Kampala by 2014. In March 2012, Pioneer Easy Bus Company, a private transport company, started public bus service in Kampala with an estimated 100 buses each with a 60-passenger capacity, 30 seated and 30 standing, acquired from China. Another 422 buses were expected in the country in 2012. The buses operate 24 hours daily.

The company has a concession to provide public transport in the city for the next five years. The buses were impounded for back taxes in December 2013. The company expected to resume operation in February 2015.

In 2014, Uganda's President Yoweri Museveni and China Civil Engineering Construction Corporation signed a Memorandum of Understanding, to embark on building a light rail system, the Greater Kampala Light Rail, similar to the one in Addis Ababa, Ethiopia.

In April 2011, the pressure group Activists for Change (A4C) held its first Walk to Work protest near Kampala, in response to a comment by President Museveni on the increased cost of fuel, which had risen by 50 percent between January and April 2011. He said: "What I call on the public to do is to use fuel sparingly. Don't drive to bars." The protest, which called on workers to walk to work to highlight the increased cost of transport in Uganda, was disrupted by police, who fired tear gas and arrested three-time presidential candidate Kizza Besigye and Democratic Party leader Norbert Mao. During the protest, Besigye was shot in the right arm by a rubber bullet. The government blamed the violence on protesters.

In 2016, the Rift Valley Railways Consortium (RVR) and Kampala Capital City Authority established passenger rail service between Namanve and Kampala and between Kampala and Kyengera. Those services were temporarily discontinued after RVR lost its concession in Uganda in October 2017.

In February 2018, the service was restored when Uganda Railways Corporation took over the operations of the metre gauge railway system in Uganda. A new Kampala to Port Bell route is being planned to be added in the 2018/2019 financial year.

== Health care ==
Kampala is Uganda's main hub for health care services. It has a mix of public hospitals, private clinics, and specialized medical centres that serve locals and international visitors. The quality of care varies depending on the type of facility, but in general, Kampala provides the best medical options in the country.

Public health care in Kampala is overseen by the Ministry of Health. The city hosts key government hospitals such as Mulago National Referral Hospital, Uganda's largest and most advanced public hospital. Mulago serves as a teaching hospital for Makerere University's College of Health Sciences and provides a wide range of services, including surgery, maternal health, paediatrics, and specialized care. While public hospitals are often affordable or free, they face challenges like overcrowding, long waiting times, limited medical supplies, and under-staffing.

Kampala has a growing number of private hospitals and clinics offering higher standards of care, often preferred by the middle class, expats, and medical tourists. Some notable private institutions include: Nakasero Hospital – a modern private hospital known for advanced diagnostics and surgery. International Hospital Kampala (IHK) – a leading facility offering general and specialized care. Kampala Hospital – known for quality services and patient-focused care.

Case Hospital provides inpatient and outpatient services among many others. Private facilities tend to be better equipped and offer faster service but come at a higher cost. Many accept international health insurance, though it's important to confirm in advance.

=== Health facilities in Kampala ===
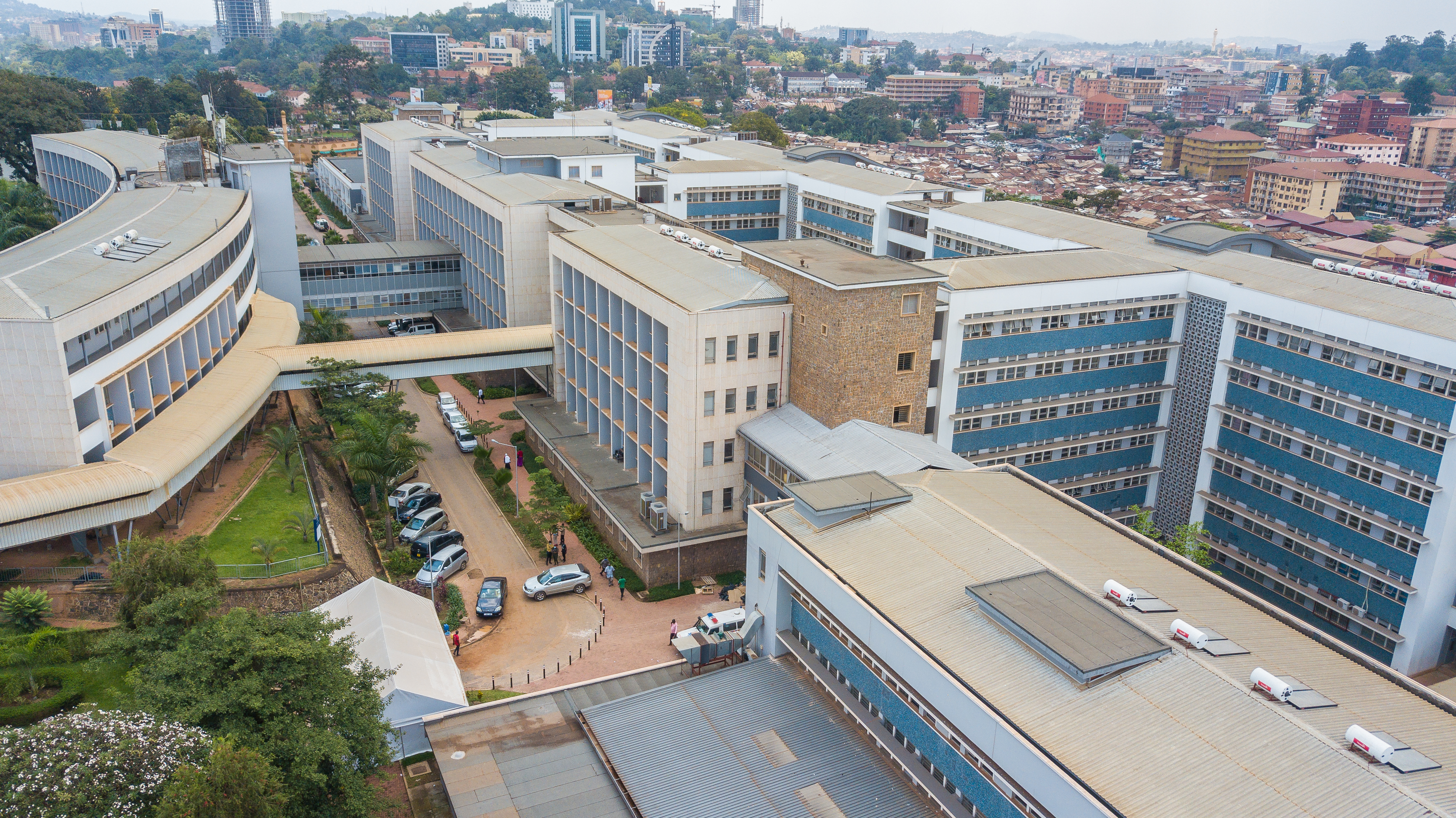
Old Mulago Hospital in Uganda

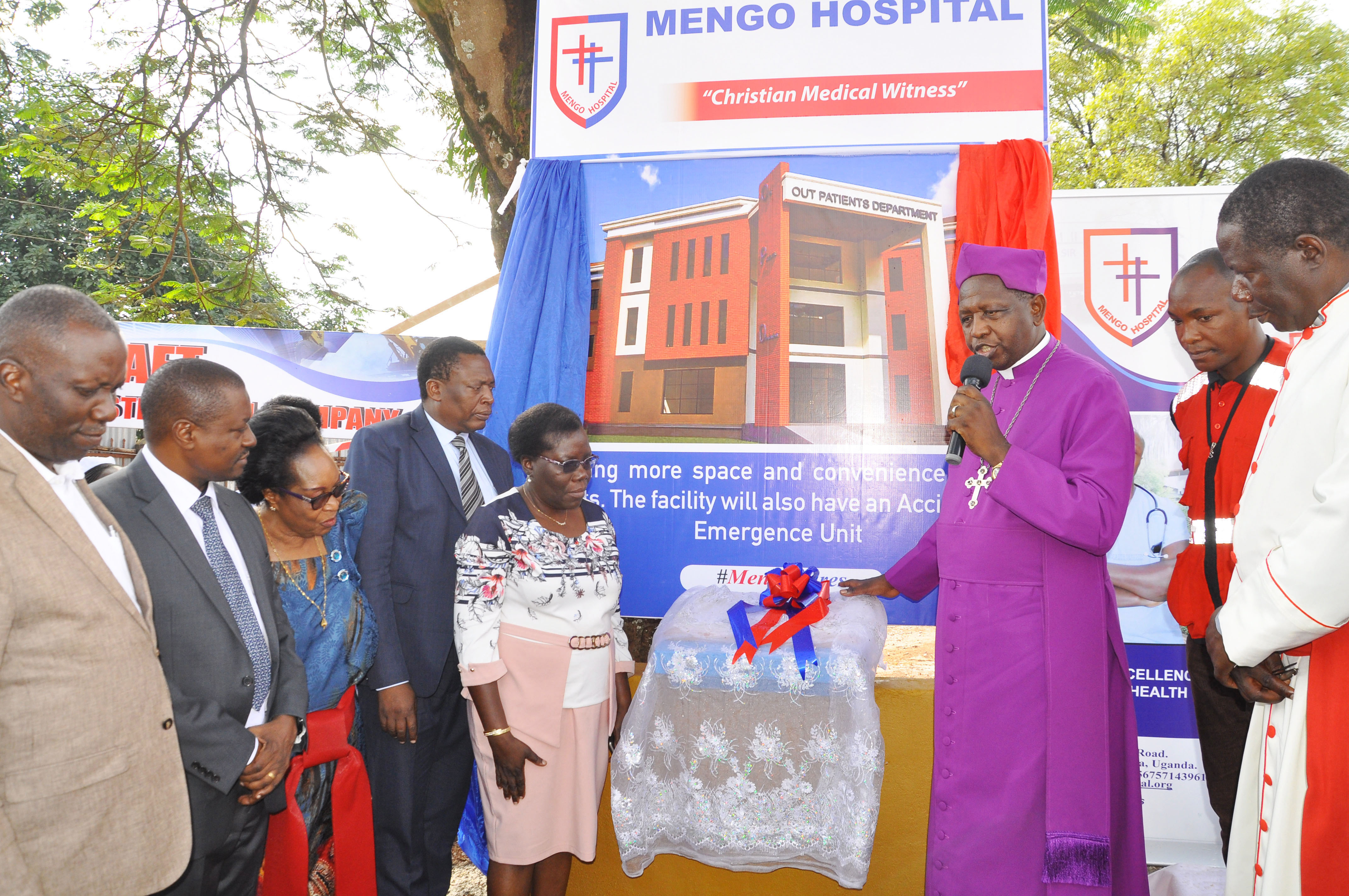
Mengo Hospital

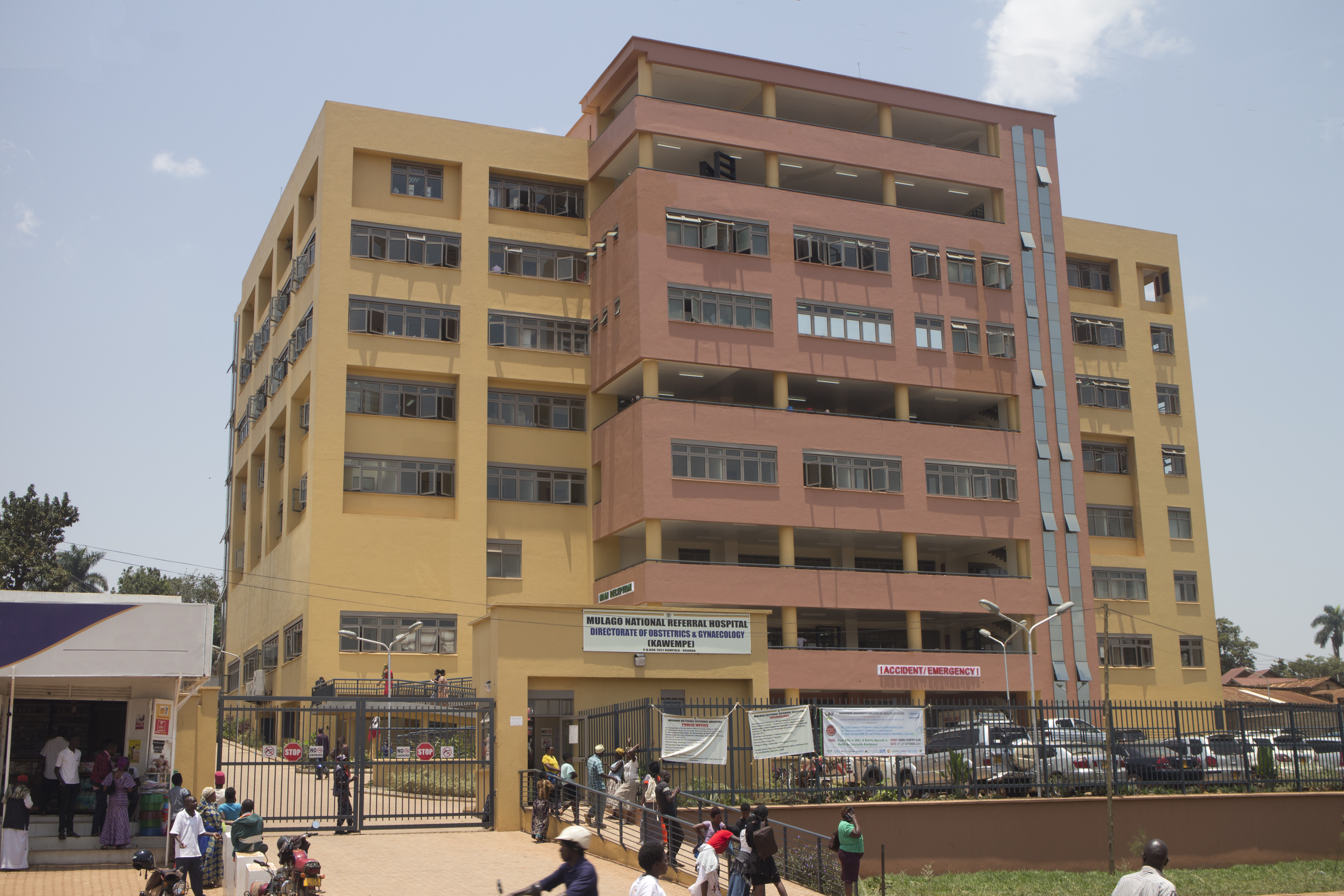
Kawempe General Hospital

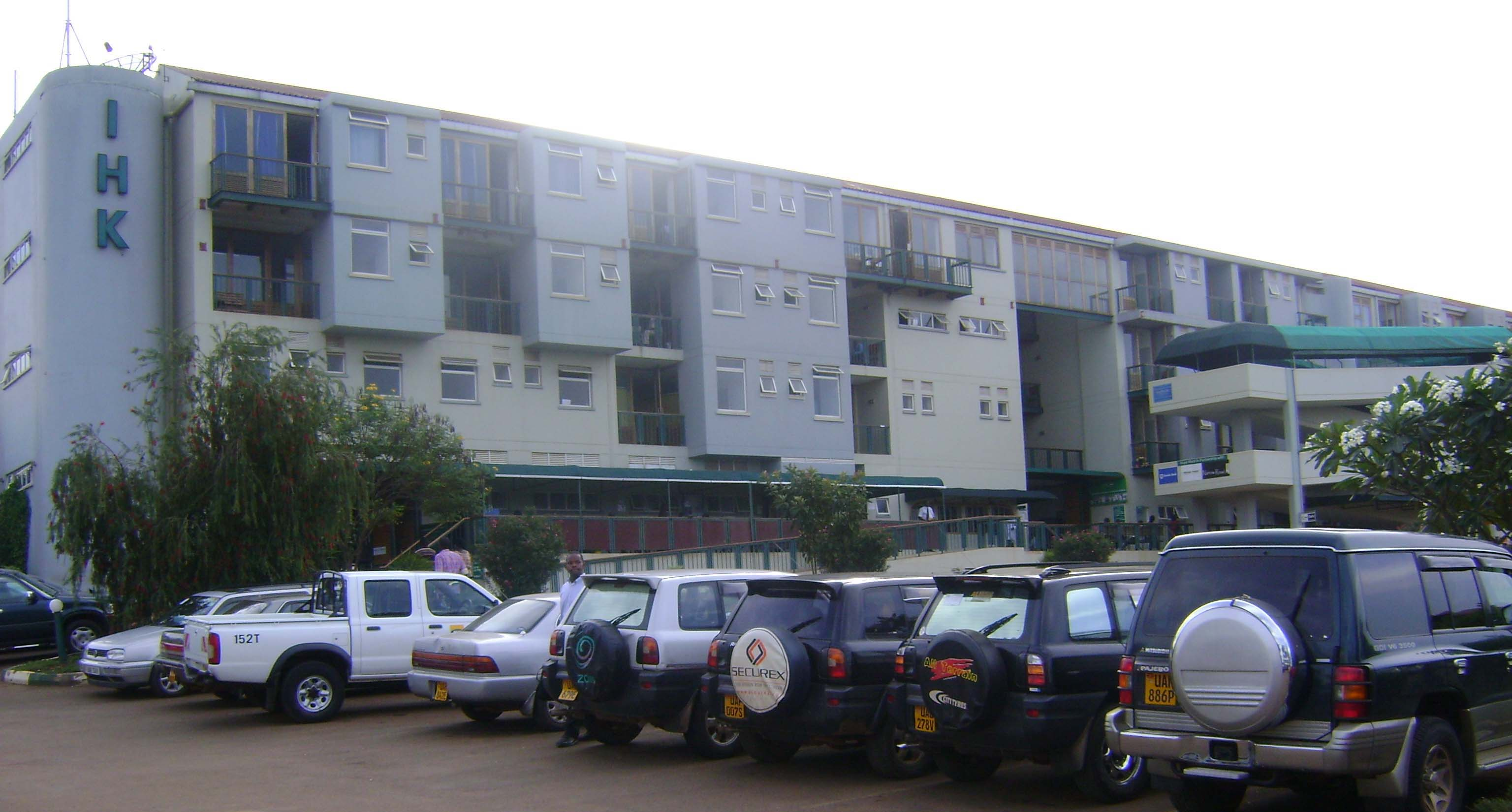
IHK Namuwongo.jpg

== Culture ==
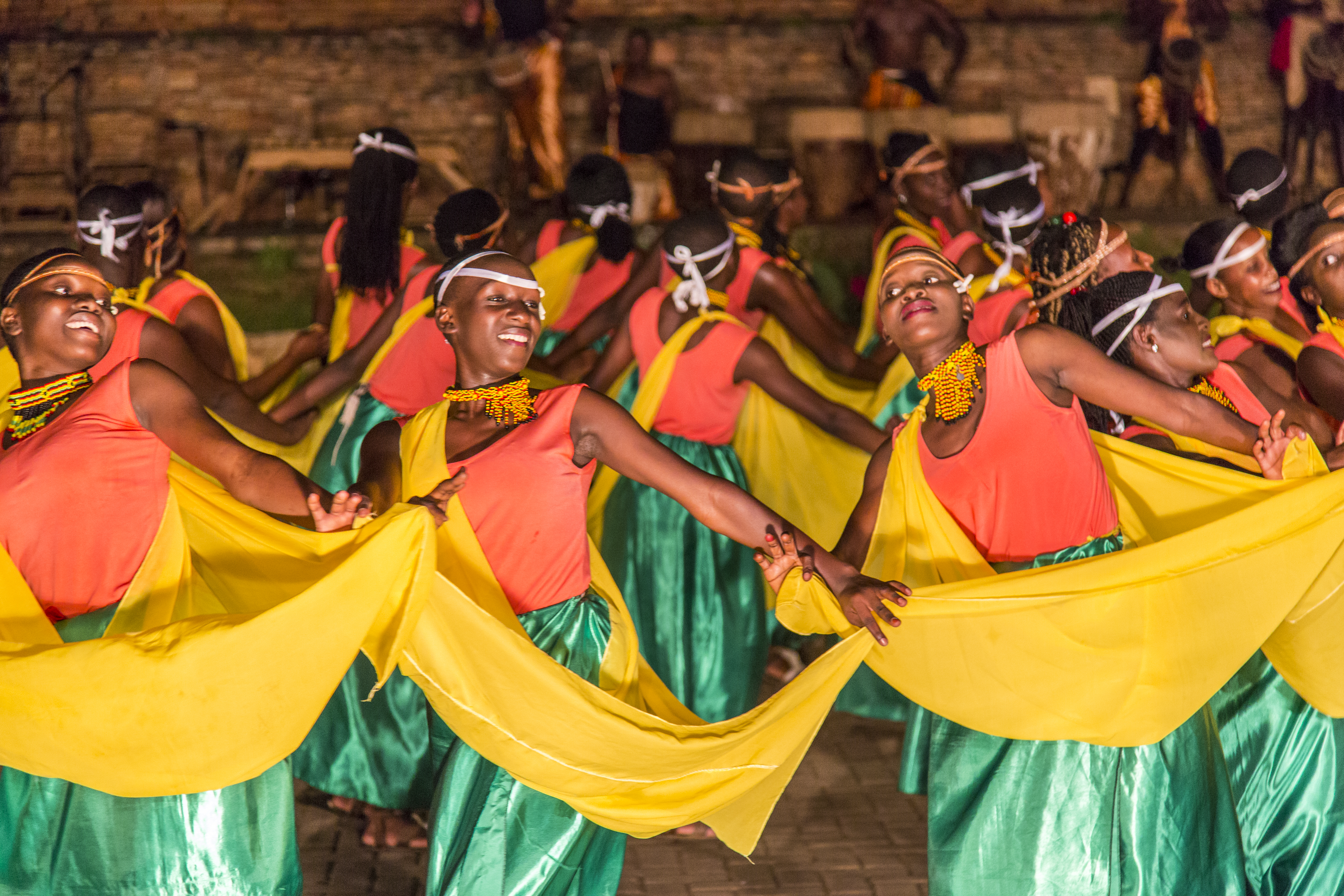
Ndere Centre in Kampala is a centre where all traditional Ugandan dances are represented. This dance is from the south of Uganda, on the border with Rwanda.

=== Cultural institutions ===
Prominent cultural institutions include the Uganda Museum and the Ugandan National Theatre.

The city also serves as the seat of the Buganda kingdom in Mengo.

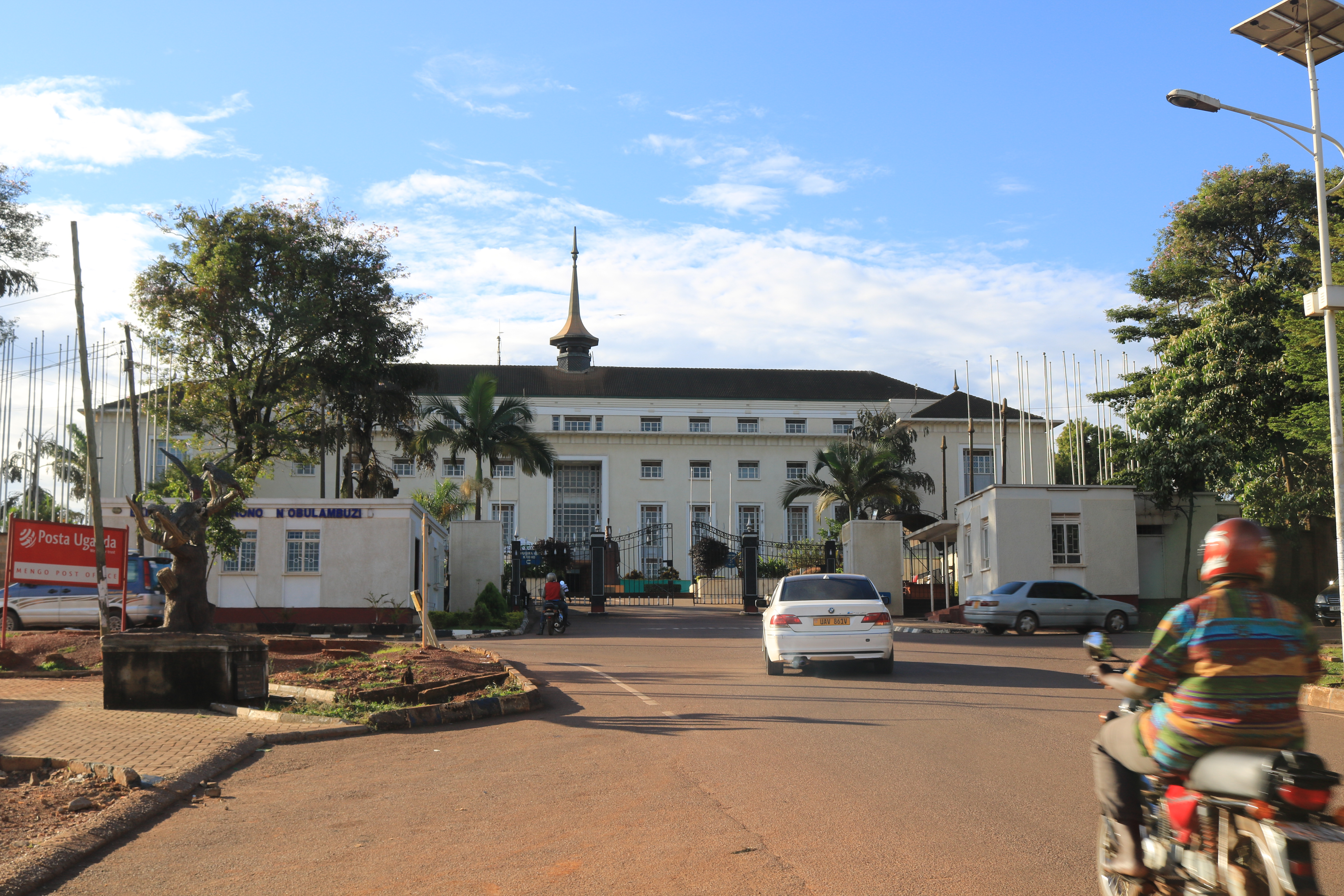
Bulange Mengo the headquarters of Buganda kingdom

One of the most notable sites is the Kasubi Tombs, a UNESCO World Heritage Site and the burial grounds of the Buganda kings.

The Independence Monument, located in the heart of Kampala, is a symbol of Uganda's freedom from colonial rule.

=== Shopping and entertainment ===
Kampala is also known for its vibrant shopping scene, offering everything from traditional crafts to modern fashion. Owino market (also known as St Balikuddembe market) is one of the largest and busiest markets in Uganda, where one can find an array of goods including clothes, shoes, and fresh produce.

The city is also filled with a number of shopping malls, such as Acacia Mall in kamwookya, Arena Mall in Nsambya, and Village Mall in bugolobi.

Wandegeya Market is located near Makerere University. There is also Nakasero Market, one of Africa's largest and liveliest.

Kampala's nightlife is another aspect of the city's leisure that cannot be overlooked. The city is alive with music and dance, with numerous bars, clubs, and lounges offering entertainment late into the night. Kabalagala and Kololo are popular areas for nightlife.

=== Cuisine ===
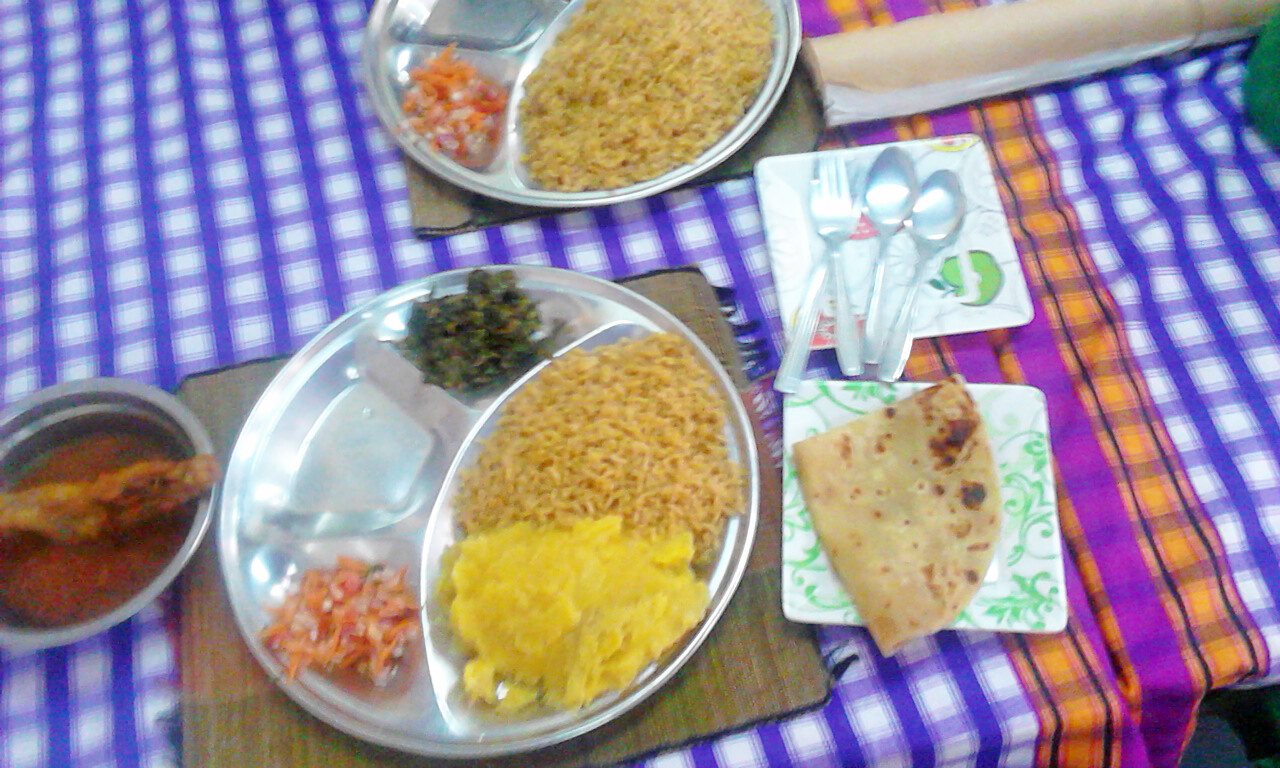
Kampala's cuisine

For those who prefer dining in a more formal setting, Kampala has numerous restaurants that offer a variety of cuisines.

Cafe javas is a popular chain that offers a blend of local and international dishes for both a casual meal and a business meeting.

One dish is called TV Chicken, named because the chicken is roasted in a rotisserie oven with a glass window that customers can watch the chicken through.

Vendors selling nsenene (Ruspolia differens, a type of katydid formerly called "long-horned grasshoppers" or "bush crickets") set up shop in May and November, during their season.

Gaba Fish Market, located on Lake Victoria, is the biggest fish market in the city.

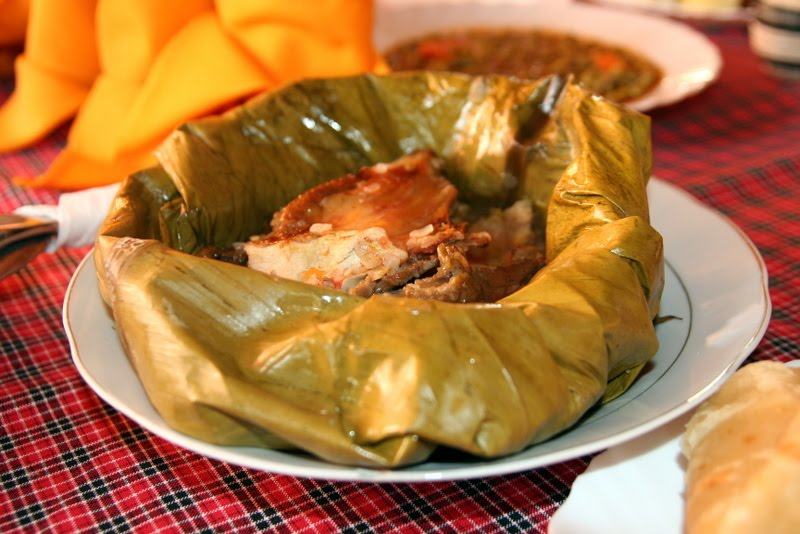
Luwombo a special dish in Kampala

=== Ndere Cultural Centre ===
A prominent cultural centre in the Kampala area of Kisasi that aims to promote Ugandan and African cultural expressions through music, dance, and drama. The name Ndere is derived from the noun 'endere', which means flute. As an instrument found in all cultures, it is chosen as a peaceful symbol of the universality of cultural expressions. The Ndere centre is famous for its Ndere troupe, a music and dance troupe that perform several nights every week at the centre showcasing music and dance from all over Uganda as well as Rwanda and Burundi.

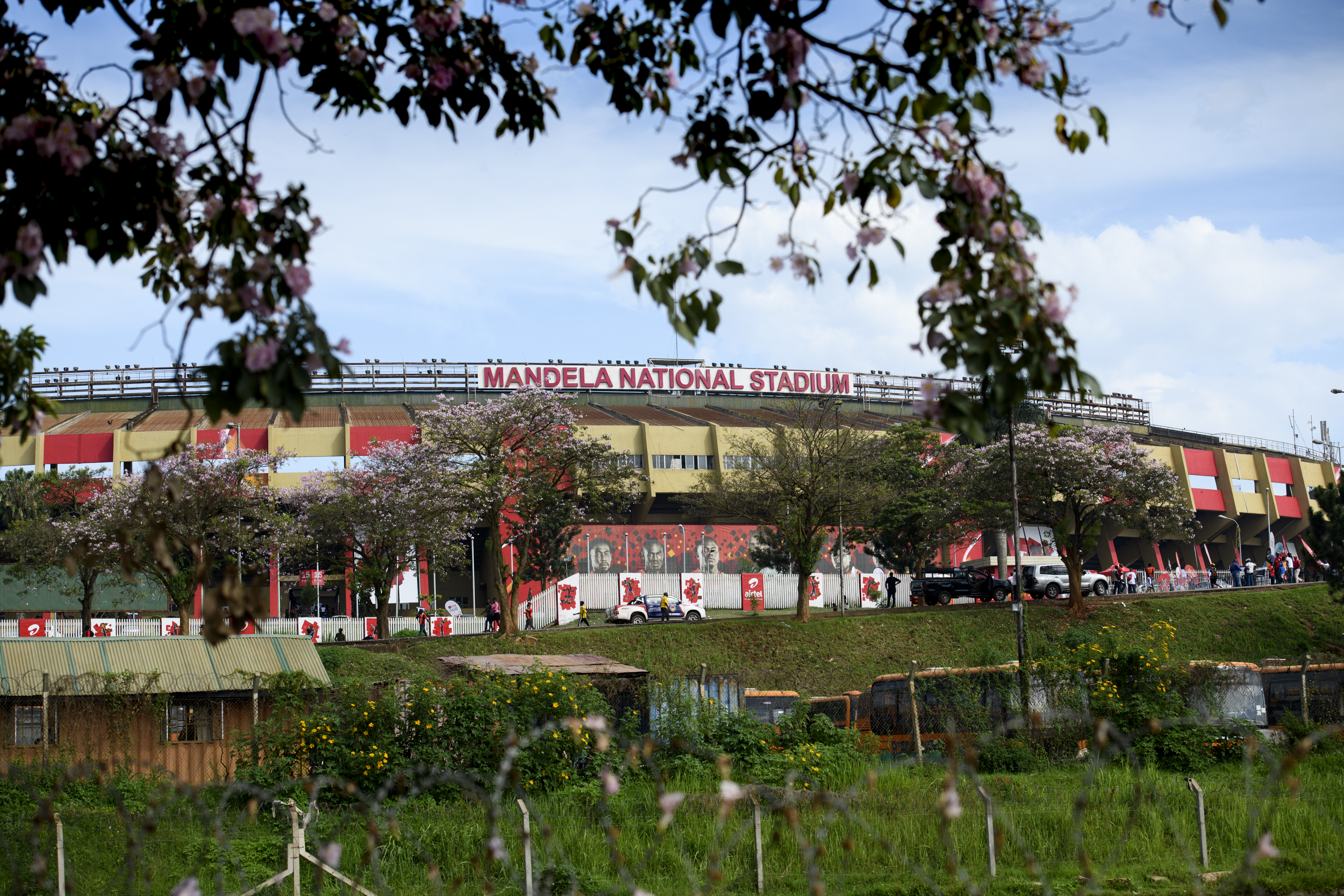
Mandela National Stadium

== Sport ==
Kampala is home to the City Oilers, one of East Africa's top basketball club teams. It is the only East African team that competes in the FIBA Africa Clubs Champions Cup. The Oilers play their home games in the MTN Arena, which is based in Kampala's Lugogo Area.

The city hosted the IAAF World Cross Country Championships in 2017. The city also hosted the Rugby Africa Cup in 2024 at the Mandela National Stadium. The 2027 Africa Cup of Nations will be hosted in the city alongside neighbouring countries of Tanzania and Kenya. The city will also host the 2031 African Games.

The Mandela National Stadium, commonly known as Namboole Stadium, is the largest and most iconic sports facility in Uganda. Located just outside Kampala in Bweyogerere, this multi-purpose stadium has a seating capacity of over 45,000 and is the primary venue for major sporting events, including football matches, athletics, and concerts. The stadium is home to the Uganda national football team, the Cranes, and hosts various local and international competitions.

Lugogo Sports Complex is a sports hub in Kampala, offering facilities for a range of sports including tennis, cricket, and boxing. The MTN Arena within the complex is a modern indoor arena with a capacity of around 3,000, used for basketball, netball, volleyball, and other indoor sports. The Lugogo Cricket Oval is another highlight, hosting national and international cricket matches, making it the centre of cricket in Uganda.

The Kampala Golf Club, located in the heart of the city, is Uganda's oldest golf course and a premier destination for golfers. The 18-hole course offers a challenging yet scenic layout, with well-maintained greens and fairways. The club also has a driving range and a clubhouse, making it a popular spot for both serious golfers and those looking to relax in a green environment.

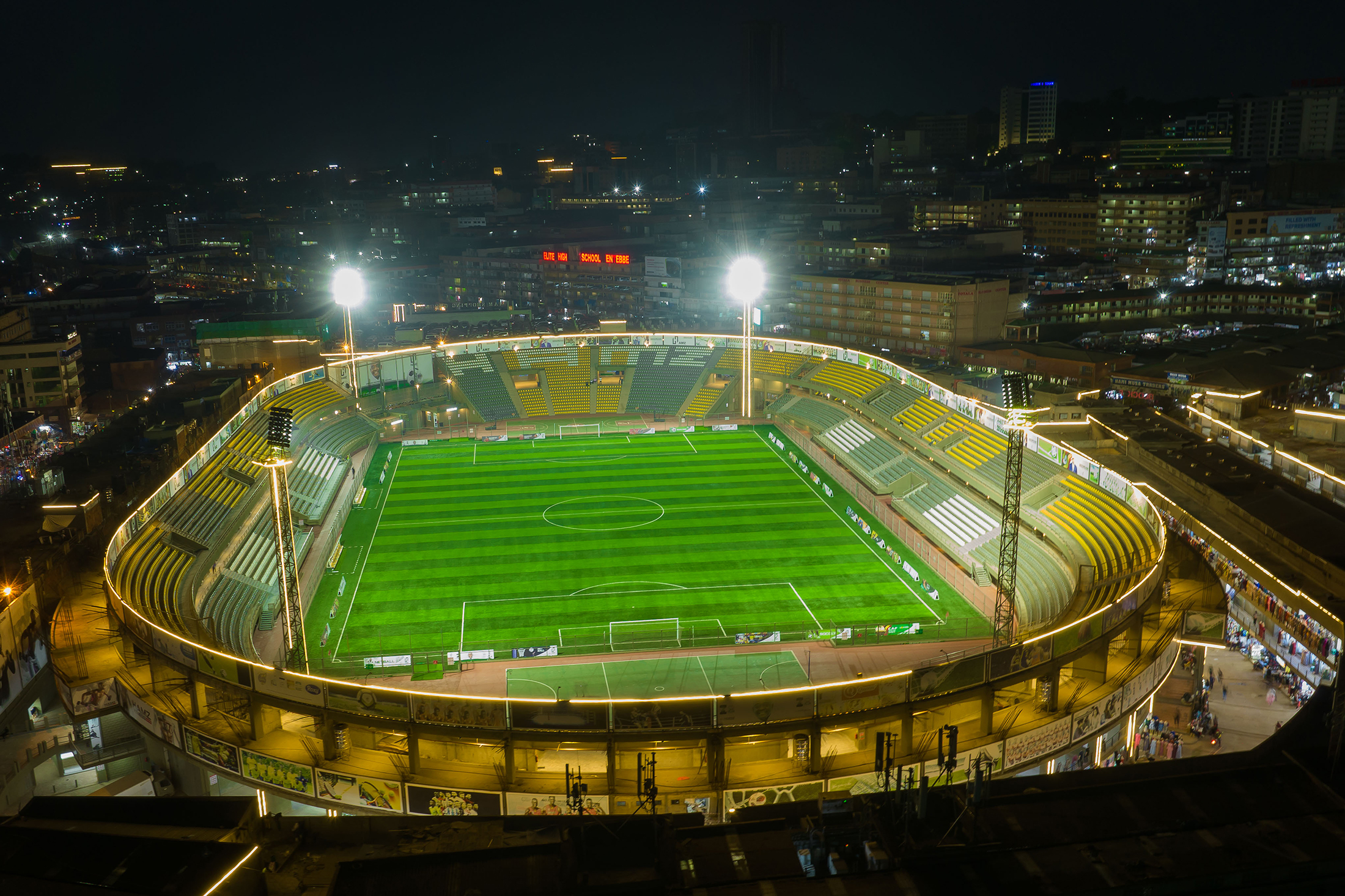
Hamz stadium in Nakivubo

The renewed Hamz Nakivubo Stadium, formerly known as Nakivubo War Memorial Stadium, is in the central business district of Kampala.

The city is home to various football clubs playing in the Uganda Premier League such as Kampala Capital City Authority FC, SC Villa, Police FC, and Express FC There are also a number of teams in Kampala playing in the FUFA Women Super League like Kawempe Muslim LFC, Lady Doves FC and many others

== Notable people ==
=== Politics ===
==== Heads of state ====
- Idi Amin (Dada)
- Yoweri Kaguta Museveni, one of Africa's longest ruling presidents
- Mutesa II of Buganda, the 1st president. Kabaka of Buganda
- Paulo Muwanga, former president and prime minister
- Apollo Milton Obote, led Uganda to independence in 1962
- Tito Okello

==== Monarchs ====
- Muteesa I, the 30th Kabaka of Buganda
- Muwenda Mutebi II of Buganda, the 36th Kabaka of Buganda

==== Other officials ====
- Salma Lakhani, Lieutenant Governor for the province of Alberta, Canada
- Erias Lukwago, Ugandan lawyer and politician and the Lord Mayor of Kampala City
- Zohran Mamdani, 112th Mayor of New York
- Bobi Wine (Robert Kyagulanyi Ssentamu), Ugandan politician, businessman, entrepreneur, philanthropist and musician

=== Activists ===
- Sandra Kwikiriza, feminist, LBQ rights and digital rights activist
- Esther Nakajjigo, humanitarian and human rights activist
- Pepe Julian Onziema, human rights activist
- Aloikin Praise Opoloje, anti-corruption activist

=== Artists ===
- Alex Mukulu
- Lillian Mary Nabulime

=== Business ===
- Maggie Kigozi
- James Mulwana
- Sudhir Ruparelia, Ugandan entrepreneur and builder, Founder Chairman of Ruparelia Group
- Hasmukh Dawda

=== Chess ===
- Robert Katende
- Phiona Mutesi, chess prodigy and subject of the 2012 book and 2016 Disney film Queen of Katwe

=== Fashion ===
- Santa Anzo
- Stella Atal
- Anita Beryl
- Aamito Lagum, fashion model, winner of the first season of Africa's Next Top Model
- Sylvia Owori

=== Film and television ===
- Shimit Amin, Uganda-born Indian filmmaker
- Mathew Nabwiso, Ugandan actor
- Whitney Peak, Uganda-born Canadian actress

=== Journalists ===
- Yasmin Alibhai-Brown, British journalist and author
- Nancy Kacungira
- Maurice Mugisha
- Rajat Neogy, Ugandan-Indian journalist, writer, poet and founder and editor of Transition Magazine
- Solomon Serwanjja

=== Law ===
- Julia Sebutinde (born 1954), jurist on the International Court of Justice

=== Music ===
- Rachael Kungu (born 1978), DJ and recording artist

=== Public speakers ===
- Derreck Kayongo

=== Religion and spirituality ===
- Robert Kayanja
- Martin Ssempa
- John Sentamu, Archbishop of York

=== Scientists and academics ===
- Kwatsi Alibaruho
- Joseph Almeida (educator)
- Ash Amin, British academic and geographer
- Venansius Baryamureeba
- Alex Coutinho
- Ellinor Catherine Cunningham van Someren, scientist
- Ivan Edwards
- Sebastian Kyalwazi
- Joshua Sikhu Okonya
- Samuel Sejjaaka, professor
- Robert Ssentongo (surgeon)

=== Sport ===
- Micheal Azira, Ugandan footballer, who plays for the New Mexico United in the USL Championship
- Cornelius Boza-Edwards, former boxer
- Moses Magogo Hassim, FUFA President who took Uganda Cranes to AFCON after 39 years and first Ugandan on CAF Executive
- Mandy Juruni, basketball coach
- John Mugabi, world champion boxer
- Martin Kayongo-Mutumba
- Denis Onyango, footballer
- Wasswa Serwanga, American football player
- Pione Sisto, footballer, Ugandan born Danish footballer
- Stephen Kiprotich, long-distance runner, Gold medallist at the 2012 Olympics
- Joshua Cheptegei, long-distance runner, world-record holder in the 10,000 metres and 5000 metres
- Jacob Kiplimo, long-distance runner, world-record holder in the Half marathon

=== Writers ===
- Marcel Theroux, British novelist

=== Other ===
- Allen Kagina, executive director, Uganda National Roads Authority, UNRA
- Julius Kakeeto, Bank executive and CEO of PostBank Uganda
- Jennifer Musisi, former execute Director of Kampala Capital City Authority

People awarded the honorary citizenship of Kampala are:

Date	Name	Notes
16 June 2017	Aga Khan IV (1936–2025)	British humanitarian and Imam of Nizari-Ismaili Shia Islam

== Gallery ==
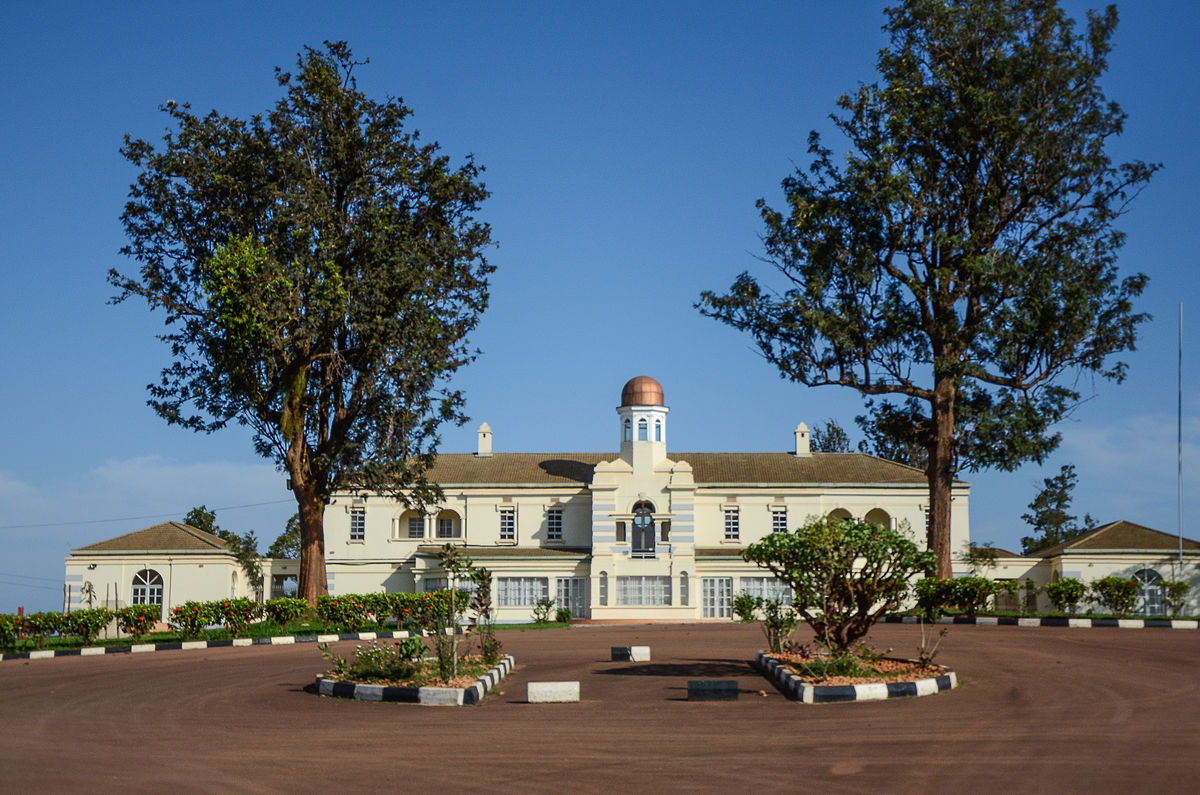
Mengo Palace

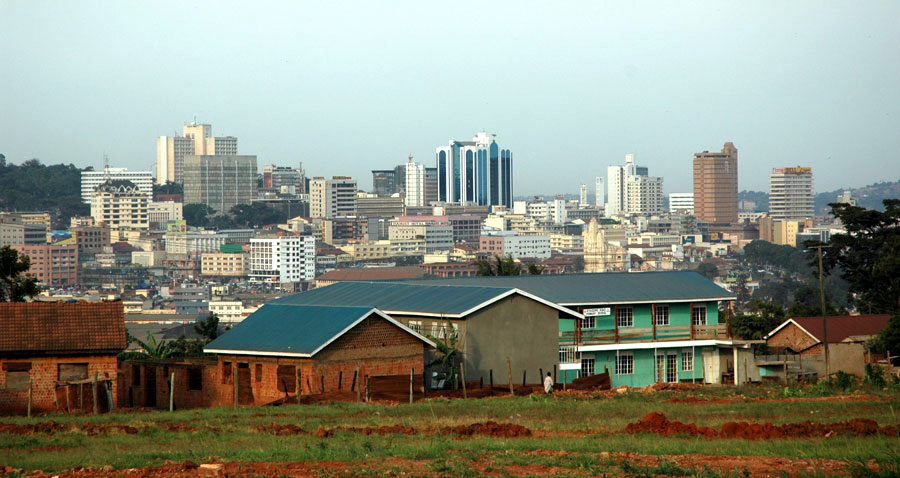
The Kampala skyline, 2006

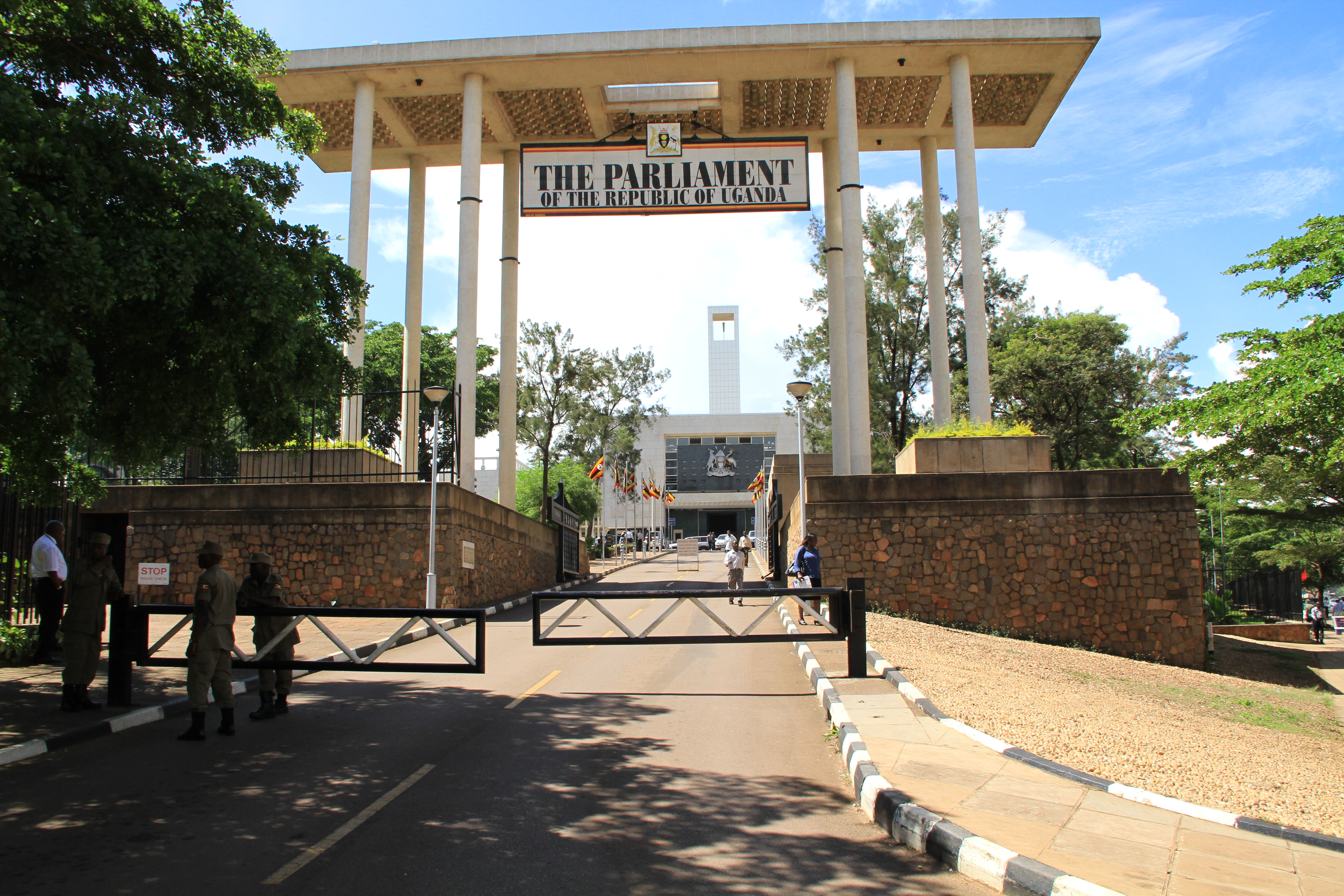
The entrance to the Parliament building

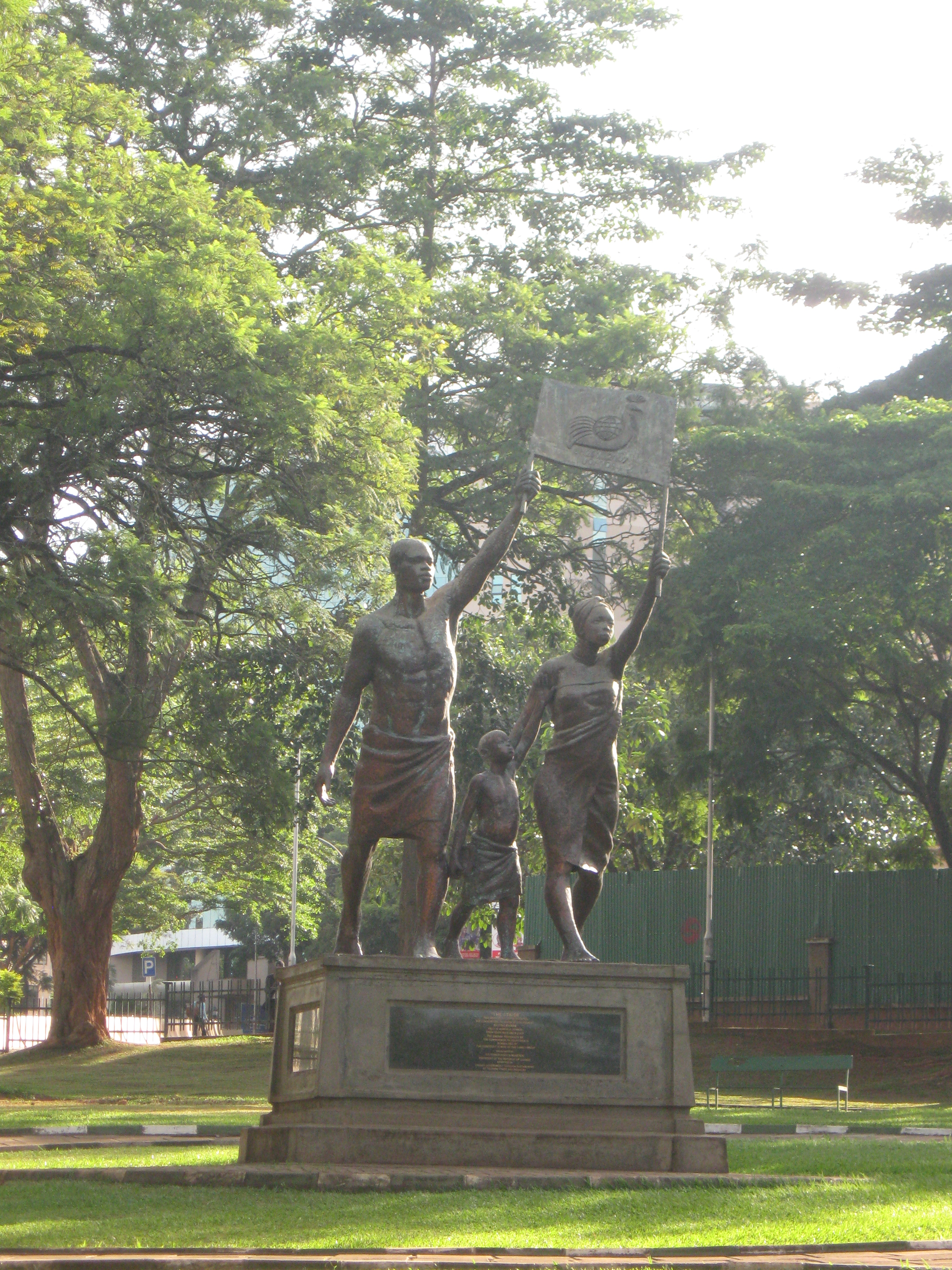
Stride monument

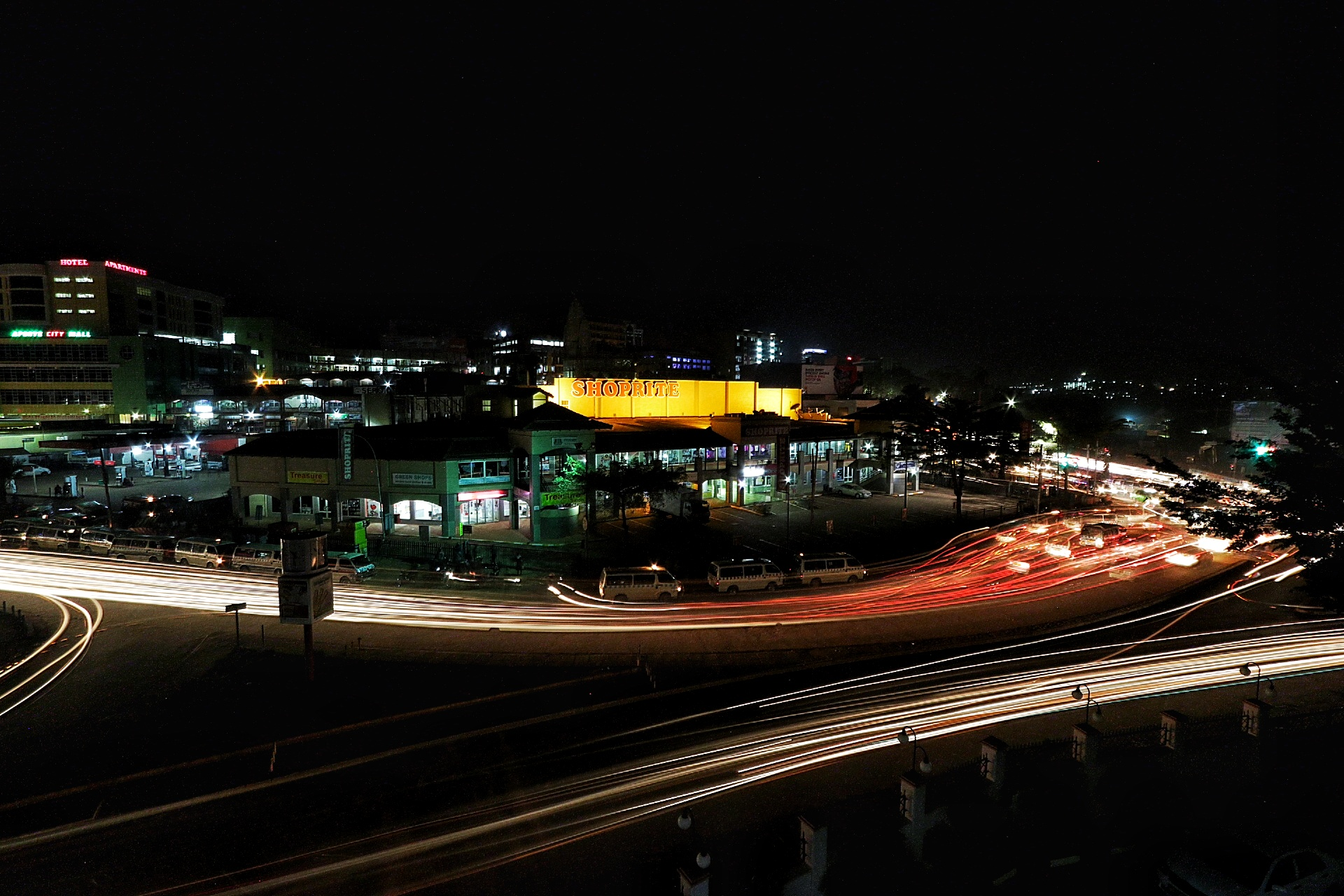
Kampala City by night

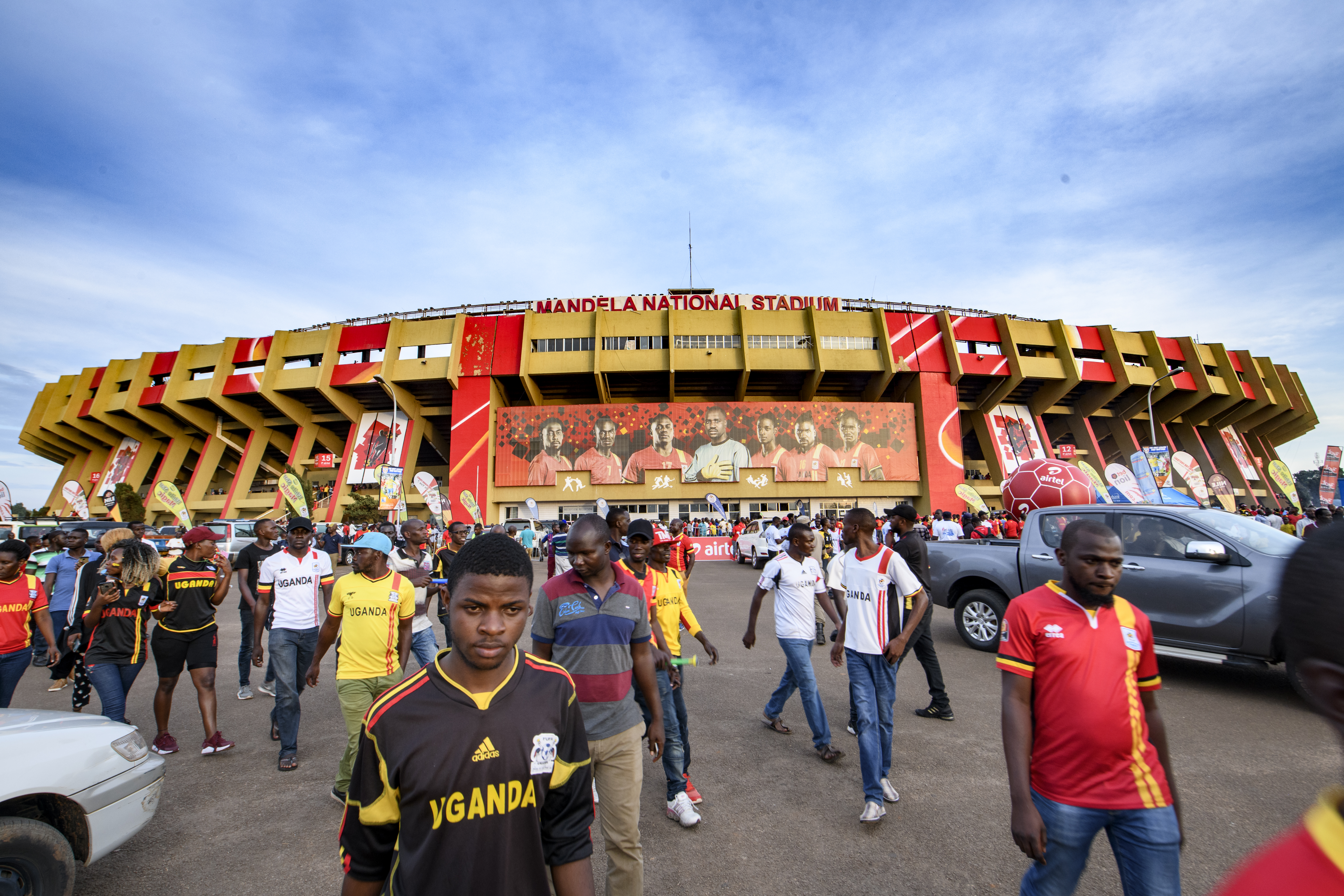
Nelson Mandela National Stadium, the home of the national football team, the Uganda Cranes

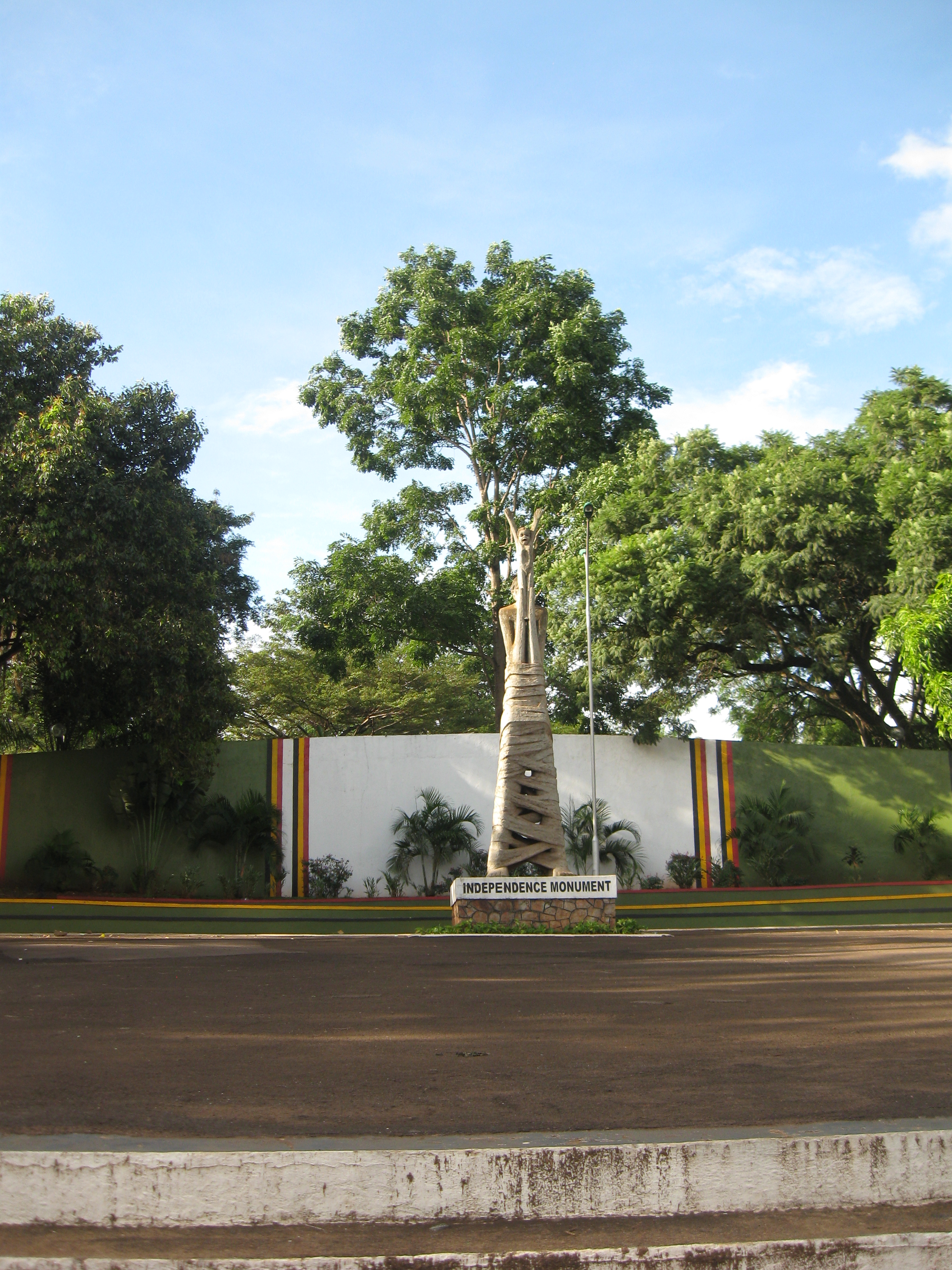
Independence Monument

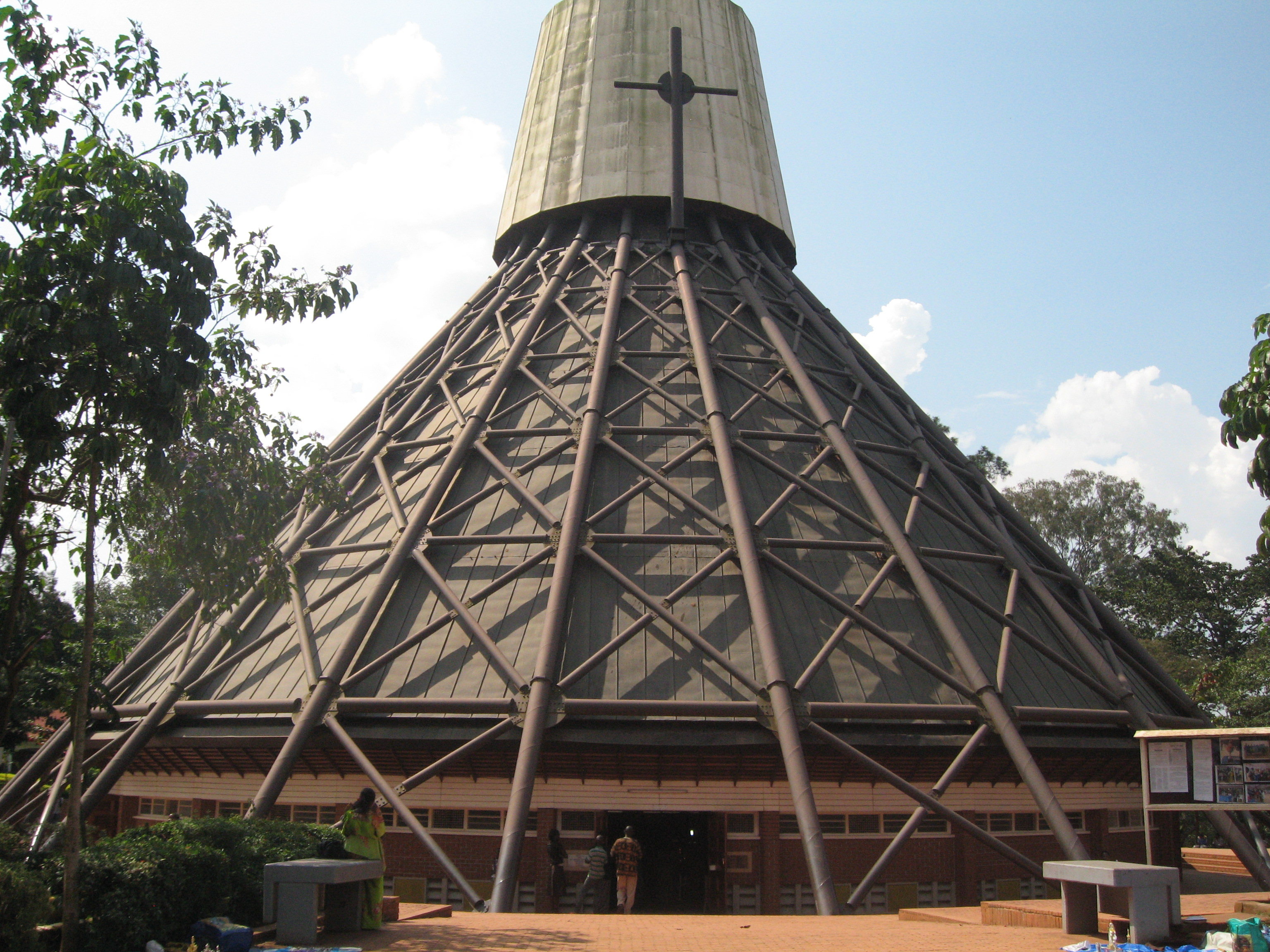
Namugongo Martyrs Shrine

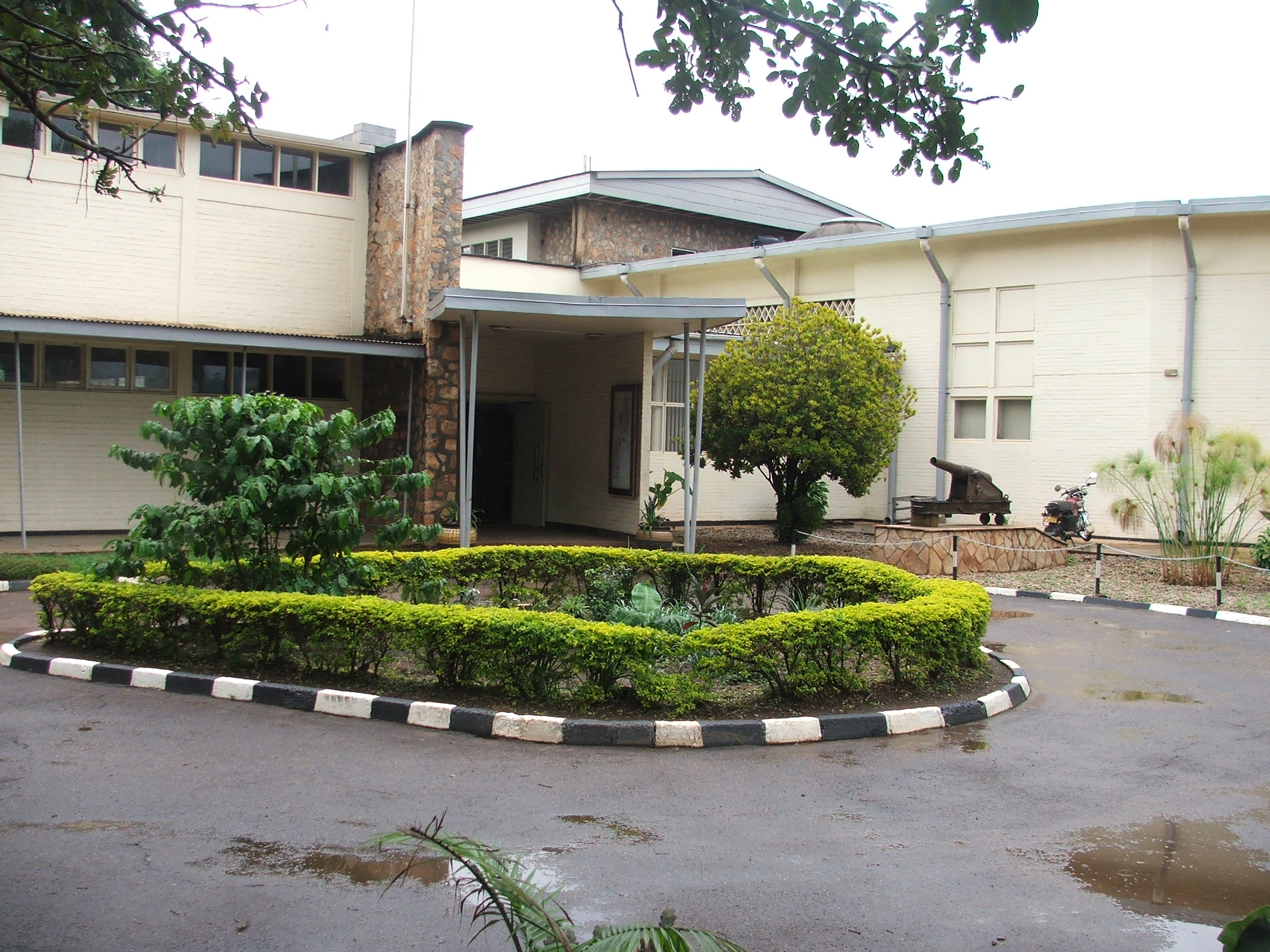
The Uganda Museum

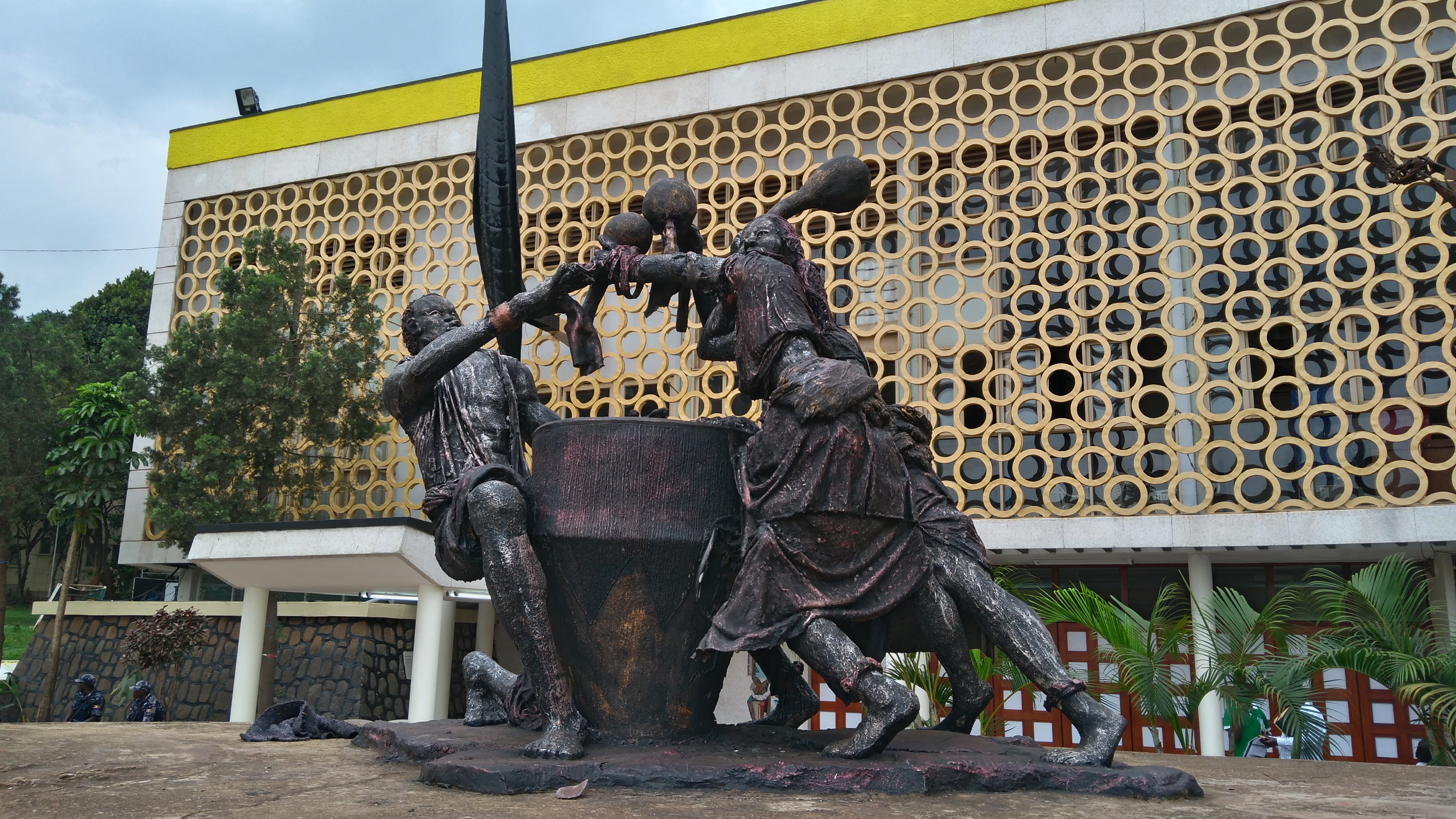
The Uganda National Cultural Centre

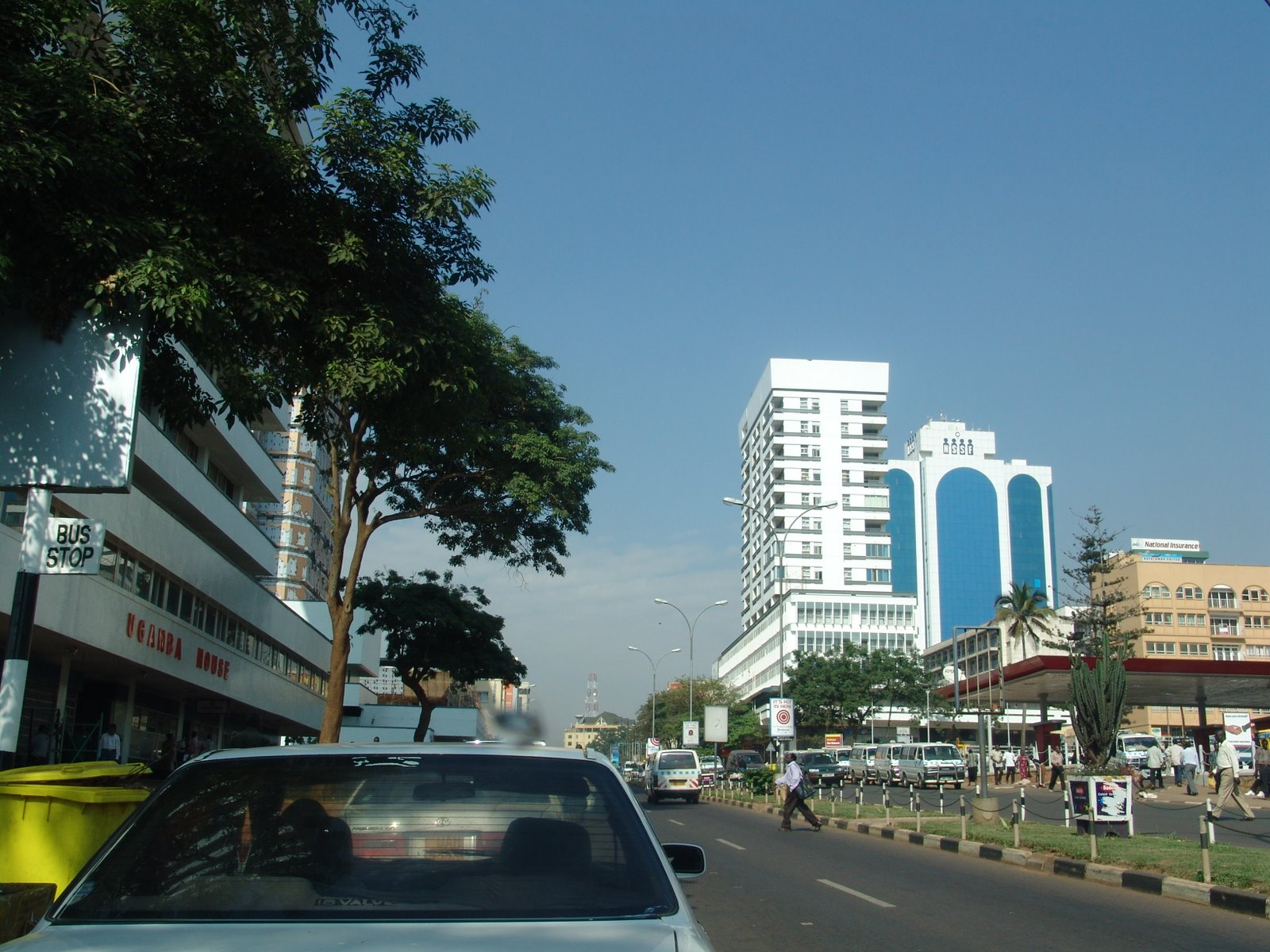
Uganda House – Kampala / Jinja Road

== See also ==
- List of banks in Uganda
- List of tallest buildings in Kampala
- Timeline of Kampala#Bibliography
- Wakaliwood – A film studio based in Kampala
