= Kibuli Mosque =

Mosque in Kibuli, Kampala, Uganda

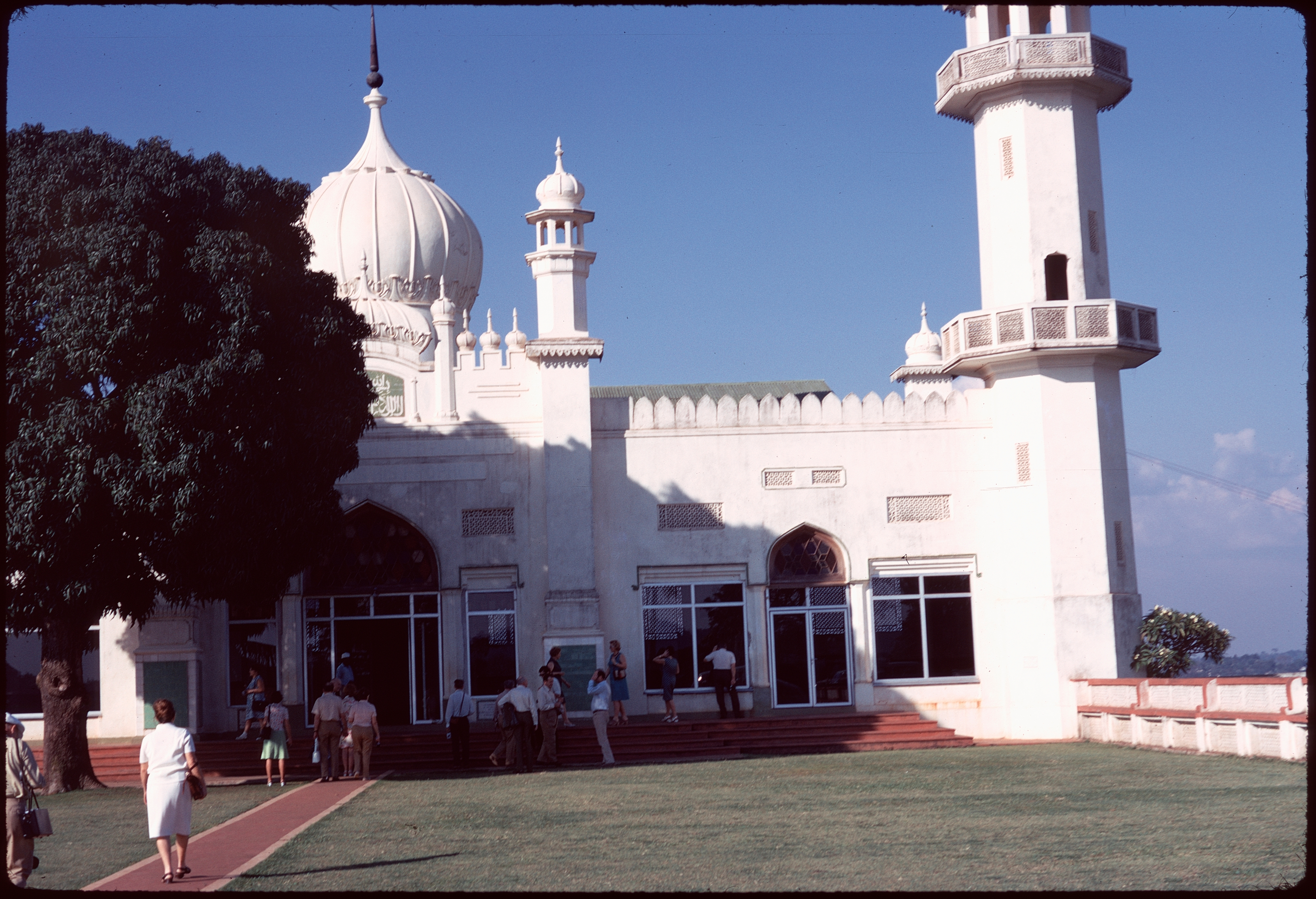

- Location of the mosque in Uganda

Religion
- Affiliation: Islam
- Ecclesiastical or organizational status: Mosque
- Status: Active

Location
- Location: Kibuli, Kampala, Makindye Division
- Country: Uganda
- Interactive map of Kibuli Mosque

Architecture
- Type: Mosque
- Established: 1920s
- Completed: 1951

Specifications
- Dome: 1
- Minaret: 2
- Site area: 32 ha (80 acres)

The Kibuli Mosque is a mosque located in the Kibuli neighborhood of Kampala, Uganda. It holds historical and religious significance for the local Muslim community.

The mosque was listed as a National Cultural Site of Uganda.

== History ==
Construction of Kibuli Mosque began in the late 1920s under the leadership of Prince Badru Kakungulu. It was officially opened for worship in 1951. The mosque is situated on Kibuli Hill, offering scenic views of Kampala city. It was constructed from contributions from local Muslims including Aga Khan, Musa Kasule, and Badru Kakungulu, who collectively donated 32 hectares (80 acres). The land is home to the Kibuli Secondary School, the Kibuli Mosque, the Kibuli Primary Teachers' Collage, the Kakungulu Memorial School, the Kibuli Demonstration School, the Islamic University in Uganda, and the Kibuli Muslim Faction Headquarters.

== Overview ==
The Kibuli Mosque features a blend of traditional Islamic and local architectural designs. It includes prayer halls, administrative offices, classrooms for Quranic studies, and spaces for community gatherings. The mosque's serene ambiance and intricate calligraphy provide a peaceful environment for worshipers.

The Kibuli Mosque serves as a place of worship and a center for Islamic activities. It facilitates daily prayers, Friday congregational prayers (Jumu'ah), and educational programs for all age groups. The mosque complex is also home to the Kibuli Muslim Hospital, which provides healthcare services to the community.

The mosque plays an important role in promoting Islamic teachings, fostering unity among Muslims, and engaging in social and humanitarian activities. It hosts religious festivals, lectures, and events aimed at promoting Islamic values, education, and community development. Additionally, the mosque encourages interfaith dialogue, contributing to peaceful coexistence among different religious communities in Uganda.

The Kibuli Mosque represents the Islamic heritage and the presence of the Muslim community in Uganda. Its historical and architectural value, as well as its community-oriented activities, have made it a notable cultural asset in Kampala.

== See also ==
- Islam in Uganda
- List of mosques in Africa
- List of national cultural sites in Central Region
