= Kibuli Muslim Tower =

Private mixed-use high-rise building in Uganda

- Location within Kampala

General information
- Type: Commercial
- Location: Kibuli Hill; Kampala, Uganda
- Coordinates: 00°18′44″N 32°35′54″E
- Construction started: February 2021
- Completed: February 2022 (Expected)

Technical details
- Floor count: 8

Design and construction
- Main contractor: Vcon Construction Uganda Limited & Ambitious Construction Limited

Kibuli Muslim Tower, also Uganda Muslim Education Association Tower, or UMEA Tower, is a building under construction in Kampala, the capital and largest city of Uganda.

== Location ==
The building is located on five acres (2 ha), on Kibuli Hill, adjacent to Kibuli Mosque, in Makindye Division in southeastern Kampala, the capital city of Uganda. This is approximately 3.5 kilometres (2 mi), by road, southeast of the city's central business district. The approximate coordinates of Kibuli Muslim Tower are 0°18'44.0"N, 32°35'54.0"E (Latitude:0.312222; Longitude:32.598333).

== Overview ==
Kibuli Muslim Tower is owned by Uganda Muslim Education Association (UMEA). It comprises rentable residential apartments and commercial office space. UMEA is expected to maintain its headquarters at this location and avail the remaining space to residential and commercial tenants, for rent.

== Construction ==
The construction contract was awarded to a consortium comprising two Ugandan companies; (a) Vcon Construction Uganda Limited, a member of the Ruparelia Group and (b) Ambitious Construction Limited. The consortium beat 14 other bidders in order to win the construction contract. Construction is expected to last one year and conclude during the first quarter of 2022. The supervising engineering company is Dolsar Engineering Limited of Turkey.

== Funding ==
The two hectares (5 acres) on which the tower stands were donated by Prince Kassim Nakibinge, "the titular head of the Muslim community in Uganda". UMEA borrowed the US10.4 million (USh38 billion) needed for erecting the building from the Islamic Development Bank (IsDB), headquartered in Saudi Arabia.

== See also ==
- Islamic University in Uganda
- Kibuli Hospital
- Habib Medical School
