= Mwesigwa =

Mwesigwa is both a given name and a surname. Notable people with the name include:

- Mwesigwa Rukutana, Ugandan lawyer
- Alice Mwesigwa (born 1969), Ugandan teacher and lecturer
- Andrew Mwesigwa (born 1984), Ugandan footballer
- Elizabeth Mwesigwa (born 1992), Ugandan badminton player
- Isaac Mwesigwa, Ugandan businessman
- Robert Mwesigwa, Ugandan politician
- Sheldon Mwesigwa (born 1962), Ugandan bishop
