= Hakim Sendagire =

Ugandan physician

- Born: 10 June 1972 (age 54); Uganda
- Education: Makerere University (Bachelor of Medicine and Bachelor of Surgery); University of Greenwich (MSc in Biomedical Sciences); Makerere University & Uppsala University (PhD in Biochemistry)
- Occupations: Physician, Academic, Academic Administrator
- Years active: 2005 — present
- Known for: Academics
- Title: Dean; Habib Medical School
- Spouse: Hadija Sendagire

Hakim Sendagire is a Ugandan physician, biochemist, academic, medical administrator and academic researcher. Currently he is the Dean at Habib Medical School, College of Health Sciences of the Islamic University in Uganda, a private university, one of the 41 universities in the country, as at February 2015.

== Background and education ==
He was born at Kasangati, Wakiso District, Central Uganda, on 10 June 1972. He attended Kololo High School for is O-Level studies, then Kibuli Secondary School for his A-Level education.

In 1991, he was admitted to Makerere University, the oldest and largest public university in Uganda. He studied human medicine, graduating, in 1996, with the degree of Bachelor of Medicine and Bachelor of Surgery (MBChB). His degree of Master of Science in Biomedical Sciences (MSc), was obtained in 1999, from the University of Greenwich, in the United Kingdom. In 2007, at the age of 35, he was awarded the degree of Doctor of Philosophy (PhD), in Biochemistry, by Makerere University in collaboration with Uppsala University in Sweden.

== Career ==
He worked briefly as a medical officer in Mulago Hospital November 1995 until August 1997. After his master's degree in the United Kingdom, he worked as the Deputy Director of Health Services at Kasangati Health Center IV, in Wakiso District, from 1999 until 2006. During the same timeframe, he served as a lecturer in the Department of Biochemistry at Makerere University. From May 2000 until May 2001, he attended a postgraduate fellowship at the University of San Francisco. In 2007 he was appointed Lecturer in the Department of Microbiology at Makerere University College of Health Sciences, serving in that position until 2014, when he was appointed Dean of Habib Medical School.

== Other responsibilities ==
Dr. Sendagire is the Technical Advisor for Laboratory Services at the Uganda Ministry of Health, based at the Uganda National Health Laboratory Services, located on Buganda Road, in central Kampala. He is also the Director of International Academic and Medical Complex (IAMeC), (Seeta Academic Complex), the company which runs Seeta Kasangati Secondary School, a private middle and high school (grades 8 to 13), located near Kasangati in Wakiso District. He has a passion for teaching science at all levels and preparing young people into future scientists.

== Personal details ==
Professor Sendagire is married and together with his wife, they are the parents of five children.

== See also ==
- Makerere University College of Health Sciences
- Makerere University School of Medicine
- Makerere University School of Public Health
- Habib Medical School
- Islamic University in Uganda
