= Saidi Mayanja =

Ugandan professional footballer

Personal information
- Date of birth: 12 August 2003 (age 23)
- Position: Midfielder

Team information
- Current team: KCCA FC
- Number: 4

International career
Years	Team	Apps	(Gls)
2024	Uganda National Football team		

Saidi Mayanja is a Ugandan professional footballer who plays as a midfielder for KCCA FC in the Uganda Premier League.

== Early life and education ==
Born on August 12, 2003, in Uganda, Saidi Mayanja began his football journey at a young age. He honed his skills at Edgar's FC and Mydel Academy, where he showcased his potential and attracted attention from top-tier clubs. He attended Kibuli Secondary School from 2012 to 2015 for his O level and later joined Kawempe Muslim Secondary School for his A level in 2016 to 2017. In addition to his football career, Mayanja is pursuing a bachelor's degree in Industrial Art and Design at Kampala University, currently in his third year.

== Club career ==
=== KCCA FC ===
In July 2022, at the age of 18, Saidi Mayanja signed a five-year contract with KCCA FC, running from 2022 to 2027. His addition to the team brought depth to KCCA's midfield, where he competes with seasoned players such as Moses Waiswa, Faisal Wabyoona, Ashraf Mugume, and Emmanuel Wasswa. Mayanja's technical ability, composure, and tactical understanding have made him a valuable asset for the club.

== Style of Play ==
Mayanja's playing style is characterized by his versatility. He seamlessly transitions between central and defensive midfield roles, demonstrating excellent ball control, precise passing, and strong defensive skills.
