= Andrew Kyamagero =

Ugandan TV and Radio presenter

Andrew Kyamagero is a Ugandan journalist, TV presenter, actor, and radio personality. Besides being a news anchor, he is also a motivational speaker and event MC. He is known by the tagline 'Omuntu Wa Wansi, which he says is copyrighted. Kyamagero is also the founder and CEO of ManCaveUg, a Twitter/X space he hosts every Saturday morning.

== Early life and education ==
Kyamagero comes from a family of seven, and he is the only boy and last-born among 6 girls. He attended Hormsdallen, Kirinya Church of Uganda, St. John's Ntebetebe, Mwiri College, and Bethel College. He is an ordained clergyman, studied theology at Durham University, UK, and is a mass communication graduate from Kampala University. He says his father, Mzee John Ssebowa, has never watched him anchor news because he believes that one day he will revert to what he wants: him becoming a priest.

== Career ==
After school, Kyamagero started his career at Best FM, an English Radio Station for Buddu. After he left for Spirit FM in Kampala later to Vision Radio, Touch FM, Galaxy FM and Record TV, then Urban TV. In April 2018, he started working with NTV Uganda, the Morning show.

== Personal life ==
Kyamagero is married to Linda Ndagire Kyamagero, with whom they both have two children, Mandela Kyamagero and Jaqueline Zaza Kyamagero. He says that, growing up, he believed in Nelson Mandela, and he believes his son will be a peacemaker, while Zaza will be outspoken and aggressive like the one during apartheid in South Africa.He said he just love to make women happy
