= Moses Muhwezi =

Ugandan academic

- Born: 23 December 1970 (age 55); Uganda
- Citizenship: Ugandan
- Education: Makerere University (B.Com, MBA), Maastricht School of Management (MPhil in Public Procurement), University of Twente (PhD in Public Procurement)
- Occupations: Academic, accountant, auditor, administrator
- Employer: Makerere University Business School
- Known for: Principal of Makerere University Business School (MUBS)
- Notable work: Research in Public Procurement and Supply Chain Management
- Title: Professor
- Predecessor: Waswa Balunywa

Moses Muhwezi (born 23 December 1970) is a Ugandan academic, accountant, and auditor. He is the current principal for Makerere University Business School (MUBS) and the second individual to hold this position.

He replaced Professor Wasswa Balunywa as the principal for Makerere University Business School.

== Early life and education ==
Muhwezi was born on 23 December 1970 in Uganda. He studied at Ntare School for secondary education and Makerere University for his Bachelor's degree in commerce.

He also did a Masters in Business Administration (MBA) in Accounting and Finance from Makerere University. He completed Master of Philosophy in Public Procurement from the Maastricht School of Management, then PhD in Public Procurement from the University of Twente in the Netherlands.

== Career ==
Muhwezi began his academic career as a research assistant, was promoted to senior lecturer then to associate professor. He acted as a Head of Department(Management Science) then became Dean (Faculty of Entrepreneurship and Business Administration), Deputy Principal and Acting Principal while at MUBS.

He was a former Vice Chairperson of the Chartered Institute of Purchasing and Supply, Uganda Chapter. He is the founder of Kirembe High School in Mitooma district in Uganda.

== Professional bodies ==
Muhwezi is a member of various professional bodies, these include;

- Member of the Chartered Institute of Purchasing and Supply (MCIPS)
- The Institute of Public Procurement Professionals in Uganda (IPPU)
- The Dutch Procurement Association
- The Industrial Marketing and Purchasing Group (IMP)
- The Technical Committee of Procurement Experts COMESA States.
