= Opio =

Opio may refer to:

- Opio, Alpes-Maritimes, France
- Opio (rapper), an American rapper
- Opio (surname), surname
- Opium, a 1949 Mexican film whose original Spanish title is Opio
- "Opio", a song by Hieroglyphics on the album 3rd Eye Vision
