= Jane Avur Pacuto =

Ugandan politician

Hon. Jane Avur Pacuto
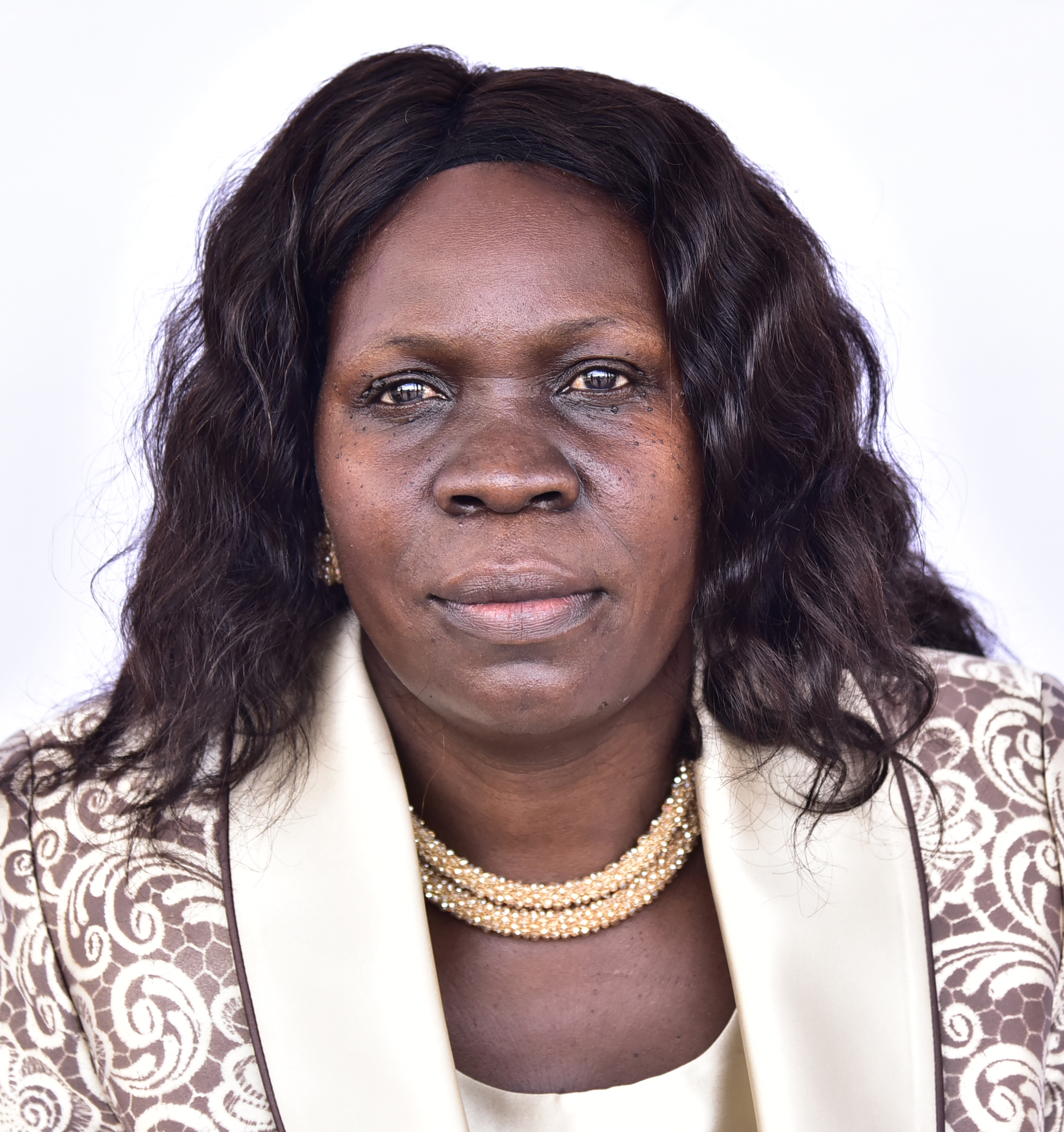

Woman Member of Parliament for Pakwach District
- In office 2017–Incumbent

Personal details
- Born: 6 January 1966 (age 60) Uganda
- Party: National Resistance Movement
- Occupation: Politician, Administrator
- Known for: Parliamentary service, Vice Chairperson of Finance Committee

Jane Avur Pacuto (born 6 January 1966) is a Ugandan female politician and legislator. She represents the people of Pakwach as a district woman representative in the Parliament of Uganda. She is a member of the National Resistance Movement(NRM) party, the party led by the current president of Uganda Yoweri Kaguta Museveni.

== Education ==
Pacuto started her primary education from Nabiyonga primary school and did her primary leaving examinations(PLE) in 1982, she later joined Sacred Heart secondary school Gulu where she completed her Uganda Certificate of Education(UCE) in 1985 and later enrolled at Kibuli Secondary School for her A'level education and did her Uganda Advanced Certificate of Education(UACE) in 1988. She thereafter joined Makerere University and graduated with a bachelor's degree in social sciences in 1991, she later added a master's degree in business administration from the Islamic University in Uganda(IUIU) in 2008.

== Career ==
Jane avur pacuto has been member of parliament of Uganda from 2017 to date, she was a board member Uganda Retirement Benefits Regulatory Authority(URBRA) from 2015 to 2017, and from 2004 to 2008 she was a credit supervisor at the microfinance support centre limited, in addition she was also assistant project administrator rural microfinance support project from 2004 to 2008. From 1998 to 2004 she was assistant project administrator poverty alleviation project and was clearing officer Uganda central transport and clearers limited from 1991 to 1998.

In parliament she serves on the finance committee as vice chairperson.
