= Asinisi Fina Opio =

Ugandan biomedical scientist

- Education: University of Nairobi; Sokoine University of Agriculture

Asinisi Fina Opio is a female Ugandan biomedical scientist, researcher and a professor at Bishop Stuart University. Fina is a member of the Council of Science and Technology, The Indian Phytopathological Society, the Agricultural Technical Committee, and the African Crop Science Society.

== Early life and career ==
In 1979, Asinisi Opio obtained her M.Sc from the University of Nairobi, and in 1992 while at the Sokoine University of Agriculture, she obtained a PhD in plant pathology.

later, Fina became a Program Leader of the Beans Program and Principal Research Officer, she became a Director of Research of Namulonge Agricultural and Animal Production Research Institute.

== Achievements and awards ==
1998-2000: Opio was awarded an outstanding performance award, in recognition of Excellent Execution of her official Duties as a Scientist in Namulonge Agricultural and Animal Production Research Institute (NARO) during the period 1998–2000.

2004: Opio Fina was recognized by the Forum for Women Educationalist in Uganda. She was also nominated for the SARAH NTIRU Award. She was the second run-up for Women Achievers of the year in Uganda. In 2006, Opio was nominated for the Presidential Science Excellence Award and competed with top eminent scientists in Uganda.

== See also ==
- Rose Mwebaza
- Alice Mwesigwa
- Alice Nabatanzi
- Pauline Bwakika
