= Isaac Mwesigwa =

Ugandan football administrator

- Born: Kampala, Uganda
- Occupations: Businessman and football administrator
- Known for: businessman, football administration
- Title: Chief Executive Officer of Express FC

Isaac Mwesigwa, is a Ugandan businessman and football administrator. On 29 May 2020, he was appointed as the chief executive officer of Express FC. Isaac Mwesigwa replaced Hamza Jjunju.

He has been involved in Ugandan football since 2008 and has vast experience in player development and talent identification.

== Career ==
He has worked in various organisations such as the Network Operations Centre Manager for Liquid Telecom and Support Engineer with UNESCO Accra, Ghana and currently he is the Technical and Support Manager for Ntest, Inc (an American Fiber Optics Company based in Minneapolis, USA) representing Africa, Middle East, Asia and parts of Europe.

He represented various players in Uganda like Allan Okello, Julius Poloto, Mustafa Kizza and Peter Magambo among others. He is also the founding chairman of Futsal Association Uganda (FAU) and works with several skills in a bid to develop an educated footballer. On 29 May 2020, Mwesigwa was announced as the new chief executive officer for Express FC replacing Hamza Jjunju, a position he left join SC Villa. On 13 June 2023, he also left SC Villa.

== See also ==
- Jackson Mayanja
- Basena Moses
- Allan Okello
- Futsal Association Uganda
- SC Villa
- Football in Uganda
