= Kibuli Hospital =

Private hospital in Uganda

Kibuli Muslim Hospital

Geography
- Location: Mbogo Road, Kibuli Hill, Kampala City, Central Region, Uganda
- Coordinates: 00°18′33″N 32°35′43″E

Organisation
- Care system: Private, Non-profit
- Type: General & Teaching
- Affiliated university: Habib Medical School

Services
- Emergency department: 1
- Beds: 200

History
- Opened: 1995; 30 years ago

Links
- Website: Homepage
- Other links: Hospitals in Uganda; Medical education in Uganda

Kibuli Hospital, sometimes referred to as Kibuli Muslim Hospital (KMH), is a hospital in Kampala, Uganda's capital and largest city.

== Location ==
KMH is located on Kibuli Hill in Makindye Division, in the southeastern part of Kampala, Uganda's capital and largest city. The hospital is approximately 3 kilometres (1.9 mi) southeast of Kampala's central business district, adjacent to Kibuli Mosque and Kibuli Secondary School.

This is about 5 kilometres (3 mi), southeast of Mulago National Referral Hospital. The geographical coordinates of the hospital are 0°18'33.0"N, 32°35'43.0"E (Latitude:0.309167; Longitude:32.595278).

== Overview ==
KMH was founded as an outpatient facility on land that had been donated in the 1930s by Prince Badru Kakungulu. The hospital added an inpatient unit with 59 beds in 1995. In 2005, the hospital opened an emergency medicine department, along with an outpatient wing. KMH is assigned a health sub-district within Makindye Division East, where it carries out primary health care activities with the collaboration of Makindye Division, the Kampala Capital City Authority, and the United Nations Environmental Program.

== Medical school affiliation ==
On 25 October 2014, the Islamic University in Uganda opened the Habib Medical School and hospital, based at its Kibuli campus, with Kibuli Muslim Hospital as the teaching hospital for the school. The school opened with 100 students enrolled in the five-year Bachelor of Medicine and Bachelor of Surgery program. The official opening ceremony took place on 10 February 2015, presided over by Yoweri Museveni, Uganda's President. It is expected that in 2017/2018 academic calendar, the school will start Bachelor of Pharmacy and a Bachelor of Dental Surgery.

== See also ==
- Hospitals in Uganda
