= Waswa Balunywa =

Ugandan business scholar

- Born: 3 December 1955 (age 70); Iganga District, Uganda
- Citizenship: Uganda
- Education: University of Delhi; University of Stirling
- Occupation: Academic administrator
- Years active: 1983 — 2023
- Known for: Academics

Juma Waswa Balunywa (born 3 December 1955) is a Ugandan economist, financier, philanthropist, and academic. He was principal of Makerere University Business School from 1991 to 2023. He is the founder of the Waswa Balunywa Foundation under which he started the Balunywa Leadership Academy and the AKB memorial hospital in Iganga District.

Balunywa has been credited with spearheading the private students' scheme in Uganda that has become a model for many universities across the country and region. Balunywa is the founder of the Balunywa Foundation, which is based in Iganga District, whose aim is to ensure the community around Iganga has better living standards through education. Balunywa built the AKB Memorial hospital in Iganga District.

== Background and education ==
Balunywa was born in Kasolo Village, Bulamagi County, in Iganga District, on 3 December 1955. He attended Mwiri Primary School for his elementary schooling. He transferred to Jinja College for his O-Level education and studied at Namasagali College, for his A-Level studies.

Balunywa holds a Bachelors of Commerce degree obtained in 1979 from the University of Delhi in India. He also has a Master of Business Administration, awarded by the same university in 1981. His Doctor of Philosophy in Entrepreneurship was awarded in 2009, by the University of Stirling, in the United Kingdom.

== Career ==
Balunywa started his academic career as lecturer in 1983, in the then Department of Commerce at Makerere University. In 1987, he was appointed a senior lecturer in the Department of Accounting, Banking and Finance, also at Makerere, serving there from 1987 until 1990. He then served as Dean Faculty of Commerce, Makerere University from 1991 to 1998. In 1997, he was instrumental in the creation of Makerere University Business School (MUBS). MUBS was created in 1997 by the merger of the former faculty of Commerce at Makerere University and the then National College of Business Studies, Nakawa. Balunywa headed MUBS at its inception in 1997 as the school's first Director. In 1998, the position of Director was changed to Principal. In June 2018, Waswa Balunywa began another three-year term as the Principal of MUBS.

Balunywa served on the Board of Directors of the Bank of Uganda, the country's central bank and national banking regulator, from 2001 until 2012. He was the serving board chairman of Uganda Airlines, at the time of its liquidation in 2001. Balunywa is the Patron of the Waswa Balunywa Foundation in memory of his father who disappeared under mysterious circumstances during Idi Amin's regime. The foundation focuses on helping needy youth and women in obtaining vocational skills for self sustenance Training lwaders under the Balunywa Leadership Academy. Ensuring proper health in the community through the AKB hospital under the Waswa Balunywa foundation which hospital provides affordable health services to the community

Balunywa, set to retire on May 26, 2018, had a 5-year extension and retired in May 2022 ending his 26 years of service at MUBS.
