= Abdallah Mubiru =

Ugandan football coach and former player

Personal information
- Date of birth: 9 September 1975 (age 51)
- Place of birth: Kampala, Uganda

Team information
- Current team: KCCA FC (manager)

Managerial career
- Years: Team
- 2012–2013: Proline FC
- 2014–2015: KCCA FC
- 2016: Vipers SC
- 2016–2022: Police FC
- 2019: Uganda (assistant)
- 2021: Uganda (caretaker)
- 2022–2023: Mbeya City
- 2023–: KCCA FC
Medal record
Uganda Premier League winner (playing career)

Abdallah Mubiru is a Ugandan football manager and former player who currently manages KCCA FC. He has coached various teams across the local football league and the senior national team.

== Early life and education ==
Abdallah Mubiru was born in 1975 to Abdallah Nsubuga and Amina Nakibuuka. He attended Kanyange Primary School and Kibuli Secondary School. He holds several qualifications, including a CAF A coaching license.

== Playing career ==
Mubiru began his football career as a midfielder, known for his strong presence on the field. He played for KCCA FC, where he was a key player in the team that won the Ugandan Premier League titles in 1994 and 1997. He played for the club from 1996 to 1998. His performances earned him a place in the Uganda national team, the Cranes, where he played between 1993 and 1995.

== Coaching career ==
Mubiru began his coaching career in 2012 with Proline FC, where he was appointed as the manager on January 3, 2012, and served until October 27, 2013. He moved to KCCA FC in 2014, managing the club from November 26, 2014, until June 30, 2015. In 2016, Mubiru took on the managerial role at Vipers SC, beginning on July 18, but his tenure there was short-lived as he left on December 4, 2016. Later that year, he joined Police FC, where he served as manager from December 20, 2016, until April 13, 2022. His time with Police FC was one of his longest managerial stints. In 2023, Abdallah was appointed as assistant coach of the Uganda National Senior (Women's) Team Crested Cranes, a position which he turned down due to personal reasons.

== Controversy ==
In his brief coaching stint at Mbeya City in Tanzania from 2022 to 2023, he was involved in a serious incident. It was during a Tanzania Premier League relegation playoff match between Mbeya City and Mashujaa FC at the Sokoine Stadium in Mbeya. Following Mashujaa FC's winning goal in the 87th minute, several staff members joined the goal scorer, John Mudeba, in celebration. As they returned to their technical area, the Mashujaa FC goalkeeping coach attacked Mubiru with a blow to his face. Mubiru went down holding his face. Despite the incident, Mashujaa FC won the game 1–0, securing promotion to the top flight and ending Mbeya City's 12-year stay in the Tanzania Premier League.

== Coaching Uganda National Team ==
Mubiru's coaching career also includes contributions to the Uganda national team. He served as an assistant manager starting on September 30, 2019, under head coach Milutin Sredojević during a critical period of FIFA World Cup qualification matches. Additionally, he held caretaker manager positions for the national team twice. His first stint as caretaker was from July 10 to September 30, 2019, and he returned as caretaker manager from March 2 to April 16, 2021.

In November 2023, Mubiru returned to KCCA FC as the head manager.
