= Faridah Nakazibwe =

Ugandan journalist

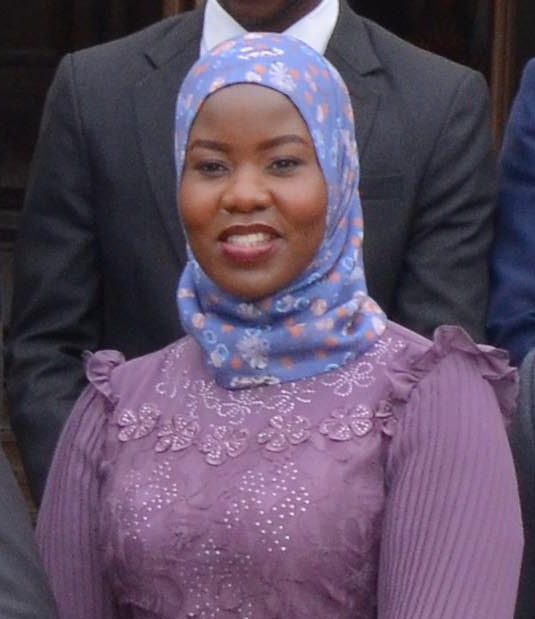
- Faridah Nakazibwe
- Born: 18 August 1984 (age 41); Sembabule District, Uganda
- Education: Islamic University in Uganda (Bachelor of Mass Communication)
- Occupations: Journalist; news anchor
- Years active: 2010–present
- Title: Head of News at Nation Television Uganda
- Spouse: Omar Ssali (m. 2016–2020)

Faridah Nakazibwe is a Ugandan journalist, who was appointed as head of News at NTV Uganda, effective 31 March 2021. She is also a Luganda news anchor and was a host of Mwasuze Mutya, a show that airs on Nation Television Uganda and Spark TV Uganda, a sister TV station in Kampala, Uganda's capital and largest city.

== Early life and education ==
Nakazibwe was born to the late Shakib Ssenyonjo and Sarah Ssenyonjo, in what is present-day Sembabule District. She is the second-born in a family of eight siblings.

She attended Kisozi Boarding Primary School in Kisozi, Gomba District for her early primary education. When the land hosting her school was acquired by president Yoweri Museveni and converted into Kisozi Cattle Ranch, Nakazibwe transferred to Bwala Primary School, in the town of Masaka, where she obtained her primary school leaving certificate. Later, her family relocated to Masaka town.

She studied at Taibah High School, in Kawempe, a neighborhood in Kampala, where she obtained her High School Diploma. She then went to the Islamic University in Uganda, in Mbale, in the country's Eastern Region, graduating with a Bachelor of Mass Communication.

== Career ==
Following the completion of her journalism degree, she was hired by the now defunct WBS Television as a reporter. Two years later, she transferred to NTV Uganda, where she was hired as the weekend news anchor of the evening Luganda telecast.

== Personal life ==
Nakazibwe was married to Omar Ssali, a Ugandan employed in one of the Middle Eastern countries. They separated in 2020.

She is the mother of two daughters, whose father is Engineer Dan Nankunda whom she met at the defunct WBS Television.
