= Kibuli =

Neighborhood in Kampala

Kibuli Kibuli Hill
- Location in Kampala
- Coordinates: 00°18′36″N 32°35′42″E
- Country: Uganda
- Region: Central Uganda
- District: Kampala Capital City Authority
- Division: Makindye Division
- Elevation: 3,973 ft (1,211 m)

Kibuli is a hill in the centre of Kampala, the capital and largest city in Uganda. The area is a suburb in the city centre and its name also applies to the commercial and residential neighbourhoods on that hill.

== Location ==
Kibuli Hill is bordered by Kololo to the north, Nakawa and Mbuya to the northeast, Namuwongo to the east, Muyenga to the southeast, Kabalagala to the south, Nsambya to the southwest, the Queen's Clock Tower to the east and Nakasero to the northeast. Kibuli is located approximately 4 kilometres (2 mi) east of Kampala's central business district. The coordinates of Kibuli Hill are:0°18'36.0"N, 32°35'42.0"E (Latitude:0.3100; Longitude:32.5950). Kibuli Hill rises 3,973 feet (1,211 m), above mean sea level.

== Overview ==
The land where the Kibuli Mosque stands today was donated by Prince Nuhu Mbogo, a member of the Buganda Royal Family, who built the first mosque there in 1892.

Prince Badru Kakungulu, a son of Price Nuhu Mbogo donated most of the land to the Ugandan Moslem community. That land today houses Bethany Victory Church, Kibuli Secondary School, Kakungulu Memorial School, Kibuli Hospital and Kibuli Teacher Training College. The hill also accommodates a police training school. At the base of the hill, on the eastern side of Kibuli, is the neighborhood called Namuwongo, the location of the old Industrial Area of the city and the oil depots of two major oil companies; Vivo Energy and TotalEnergies.

== Points of interest ==
The following points of interest lie on Kibuli Hill:

1. Kibuli Hospital
2. Kibuli Mosque
3. Kibuli Secondary School, a mixed day and boarding secondary school
4. Kibuli Teacher Training College.
5. Kibuli Muslim Tower, an under construction residential and office tower

Other points of interest include:

1. Uganda Police Force Training Academy
2. Habib Medical School, the medical school of the Islamic University in Uganda (IUIU)
3. Greenhill Academy, an upscale private school (Grades: PreK through Grade 13).

== See also ==
- Lubaga
- Namirembe
- Namungoona
- Nakasero
- Nsambya
- Kabalagala
- Kikaaya
