= Badru Kateregga =

Ugandan academic and entrepreneur

Professor Badru Kateregga
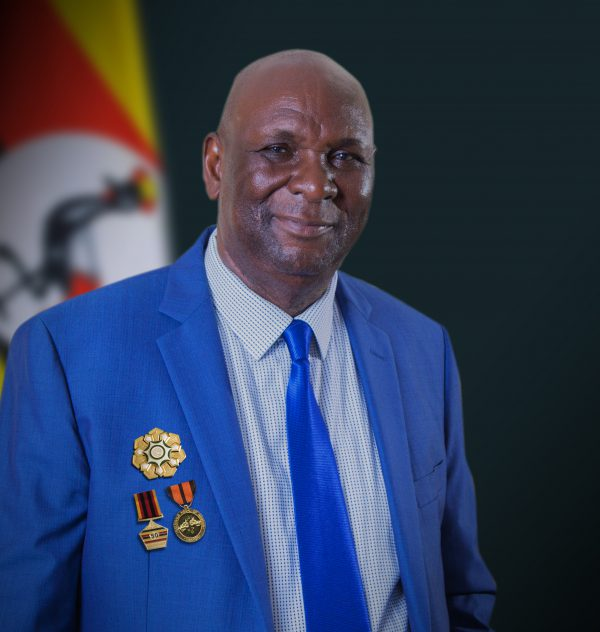
- Born: 4 December 1948 (age 77); Uganda
- Citizenship: Uganda
- Education: Makerere University (Bachelor of Arts); University of London (Master of Arts); Kampala University (Honorary Doctor of Letters)
- Occupations: University administrator, academic and entrepreneur
- Years active: 1979–present
- Known for: Academic leadership
- Website: https://www.profbadrukateregga.com

Badru Dungu Kateregga (born 4 December 1948), is a Ugandan academic, entrepreneur and academic administrator, who serves as the vice chancellor of Kampala University, a private university that he co-founded.

== Background and education ==
He was born on 4 December 1948 to Hajat Aisha Nakato Namusoke and the late Hajj Kateregga, in Kabasanda village, in present-day Butambala District, in the Buganda Region of Uganda.

He attended Kabasanda Primary School, between 1956 until 1964, graduating with a Primary Leaving Certificate. He then transferred to Kabasanda Junior Secondary School, graduating with a Junior Leaving Certificate in 1967. He obtained a High School Diploma in 1969 from Kibuli Secondary School, specializing in Arts subjects.

In 1970, he was admitted to Makerere University, Uganda's oldest and largest public university, where he studied History, Religious Studies and Philosophy. He graduated three years later with a Bachelor of Arts degree. He obtained a Master of Arts degree from the School of Oriental and African Studies at the University of London, specializing in the History of the Middle East and Islamic studies.

In 2010, the Senate of Kampala University awarded him a Doctor of Letters degree.

== Career ==
Following his graduate studies in the United Kingdom, he returned to Uganda and was appointed as a lecturer in the Department of Religious Studies and Philosophy in the Faculty of Arts at Makerere University.

== Kampala University ==
In 1999, while still a lecturer at Makerere University, Kateregga, together with other stakeholders founded Kampala University, a multi-campus private university whose main campus is located in Ggaba, on the northern shores of Lake Victoria. In 2014, he retired from Makerere University to devote his focus on the private university that he had co-founded.

== See also ==
- Education in Uganda
- List of Universities in Uganda
- List of university leaders in Uganda

== Succession table as Vice Chancellor, Kampala University ==
Preceded by None	Vice Chancellor of Kampala University; 2009 - present	Succeeded by Incumbent
