= Ritah Asiimwe =

Ugandan para badminton player

Ritah Asiimwe PLY
Personal information
- Born: 10 July 1986 (age 40) Kabarole, Uganda

Sport
- Country: Uganda
- Sport: Badminton
- Handedness: Left

Women's singles SU5 Women's doubles SL3–SU5 Mixed doubles SL3–SU5
- Highest ranking: 15 (WS 29 November 2022); 7 (WD with Elizabeth Mwesigwa 2 July 2024); 98 (XD with Kizza Edward Kabonge 20 September 2022)
- Current ranking: 19 (WS); 11 (WD with Elizabeth Mwesigwa) (5 September 2024)
- BWF profile
Medal record
Women's para badminton
Representing Uganda
African Championships
Gold medal – first place	2022 Kampala	Women's singles
Gold medal – first place	2022 Kampala	Women's doubles
Bronze medal – third place	2023 Kampala	Women's doubles

Ritah Asiimwe PLY (born 10 July 1986) is a Ugandan para badminton player who is ranked as the country's number one in the women's SU5 category. She is ranked as Africa's number 2 para badminton player and in 2020 became the first Ugandan para badminton player to compete in the Summer Paralympics.

As of 16 April 2024, she is ranked 7th worldwide in the women's para-badminton doubles (SL3-SU5 category) and 19th worldwide in the women's para-badminton singles (SU5 category) by the Badminton World Federation.

== Background and education ==
Asiimwe has a bachelor's degree in Development studies from Mbarara University.

As a beneficiary of the Badminton World Federation in partnership with the World Academy of Sport (WAoS) initiative, she graduated from the University of London’s Postgraduate Certificate in International Sports Management programme in 2023.

== Sports ==
In January 2005, Asiimwe lost her right arm after an assault and now uses her left hand. After visiting the Uganda Para Badminton International in 2018, she took up the sport.

While ranked 15th in the SU5 women's singles, she participated in the Tokyo 2020 Paralympic Games.

Asiimwe has participated in the 2021, 2022 and 2023 editions of the African Para-Badminton Championships. She won the SU5 women's singles and partnered with Elizabeth Mwesigwa to win the SL3-SU5 women's doubles in 2022, and teamed up with Mwesigwa again in 2023 to finish tied for third in the SL3-SU5 Women's Doubles.

== Achievements ==
=== African Championships ===
Women's singles

Year	Venue	Opponent	Score	Result
2022 (Note: This tournament uses a round robin system.)	Lugogo Indoor Stadium, Kampala, Uganda	(Central African Republic) Ketsia Ambare	21–7, 21–12	Gold
2022	Lugogo Indoor Stadium, Kampala, Uganda	(Egypt) Mona Fares Mohamed	21–7, 24–26, 21–6	Gold
2022	Lugogo Indoor Stadium, Kampala, Uganda	(Uganda) Sumini Mutesi	21–18, 17–21, 21–14	Gold
2022	Lugogo Indoor Stadium, Kampala, Uganda	(Zambia) Josephine Zulu	21–10, 21–16	Gold

Women's doubles

Year	Venue	Partner	Opponent	Score	Result
2022	Lugogo Indoor Stadium, Kampala, Uganda	(Uganda) Elizabeth Mwesigwa	(Uganda) Sumini Mutesi (Uganda) Rose Nansereko	21–11, 21–16	Gold
2023	Lugogo Indoor Stadium, Kampala, Uganda	(Uganda) Elizabeth Mwesigwa	(Nigeria) Mariam Eniola Bolaji (Nigeria) Chinyere Lucky Okoro	10–21, 7–21	Bronze

== See also ==
- Africa Para-Badminton Championships
- Badminton at the 2020 Summer Paralympics
