= Arnold Ainebyona Mugisha =

Ugandan businessman and inventor (1993–2019)

- Born: March 9, 1993; Masindi District, Uganda
- Died: July 9, 2019 (aged 26); Naalya, Kampala, Uganda
- Cause of death: Gunshot wound
- Education: Lohana Academy (Primary); Kibuli Secondary School (O-level); Kings College Budo (A-level); Oxford Brookes University – BSc in Real Estate Management (2012–2015); University of Reading – MSc in Real Estate Management (2015–2016)
- Occupations: Businessman, Entrepreneur, Inventor
- Employer: Knight Frank Uganda
- Known for: Automatic Pill Dispensing and Medical Assistant system; contributions to real estate
- Awards: Top Entrepreneurial Award, IST-Africa Conference

Arnold Ainebyona Mugisha (March 9, 1993 – July 9, 2019) was a Ugandan businessman and inventor, known for his work in real estate and technology. He gained recognition for developing an Automatic Pill Dispensing and Medical Assistant system at the age of 18, winning the top entrepreneurial award at the IST-Africa conference. He died in 2019 after being fatally shot by a security guard in a dispute at Quality Supermarket in Naalya, Kampala.

== Early life and education ==
Arnold Mugisha was born to Plan Mugisha (father) and Beatrice Mugisha (mother) on 9 March 1993 as the eldest of his four siblings in Masindi District. He attended his primary studies at Lohana Academy and then enrolled for his O-level at Kibuli Secondary School and A-level at Kings College Budo. He studied his Bachelor's in Real Estate Management at Oxford Brookes University between 2012-2015 and Masters in the same program at University of Reading in the UK between 2015-2016.

== Career ==
He was employed at Knight Frank Uganda, where he contributed to the real estate sector. He also ventured into entrepreneurship by opening Hickory Bar and Restaurant in Kololo, Kampala.

== Innovations and achievements ==
At the age of 18, Arnold Mugisha developed the Automatic Pill Dispensing and Medical Assistant system, a project that won the top entrepreneurial award at the IST-Africa conference. His innovation demonstrated his potential to contribute significantly to both the medical and technology fields.

== Death ==
On Tuesday July 9, 2019 at 10:30 am , Arnold Mugisha was shot and killed by a security guard, Moses Angoria, at Quality Supermarket in Naalya, Kampala. The incident occurred after a minor altercation involving a shopping trolley that scratched another vehicle. According to reports, the situation escalated when Mugisha attempted to drive away and allegedly struck the leg of one of the security personnel. In response, Angoria retrieved a firearm from his security booth and fatally shot Mugisha in the mouth while he was seated in his car.

The shooting sparked public outrage and raised questions about the conduct of private security personnel in Uganda. Arnold’s family and some social media users speculated that the incident may have been influenced by tribalism, a claim that added to the controversy surrounding his death.
