= Hakim Zziwa =

Ugandan director, producer, cinematographer

- Zziwa at SVAFF in 2026
- Born: February 27, 1984 (age 42); Kampala, Uganda
- Education: MUBS
- Occupations: Director, Cinematographer
- Years active: 2016–present

Hakim Zziwa is a Ugandan born director, producer and cinematographer who drew inspiration for visual storytelling from his performance background as a dance artist. His short film Building 62 won the best Short Film Award at the 2nd IKON Awards in 2024. He also received a Special Jury Award at the 2024 Uganda Film Festival Awards for his work on the same film.

== Career ==
Zziwa started his career as a dancer under a group called Tabu Flo before joining film. In film, he worked as a Media Assistant at the Harvard Graduate School of Education, department of Teaching and Learning Lab (TLL) in 2016 and as an Instructional Media Producer with Center for Digital Innovation in Learning (CDIL) at Boston College in 2019. He then went on to produce and direct short films Kisenge (2017), Yala (2020), Jamaa, The Dark One (2021) Building 62 (2023) which won the Best Short Film award at the 2nd iKon Awards in March 2024 and Boundary Mwisho (2024).

== Personal life ==
Zziwa was educated at Nakasero Nursery School, Buganda Road Primary School then Kibuli Secondary School and studied International Business MUBS.
