= Usher Komugisha =

Ugandan sports journalist, analyst and commentator

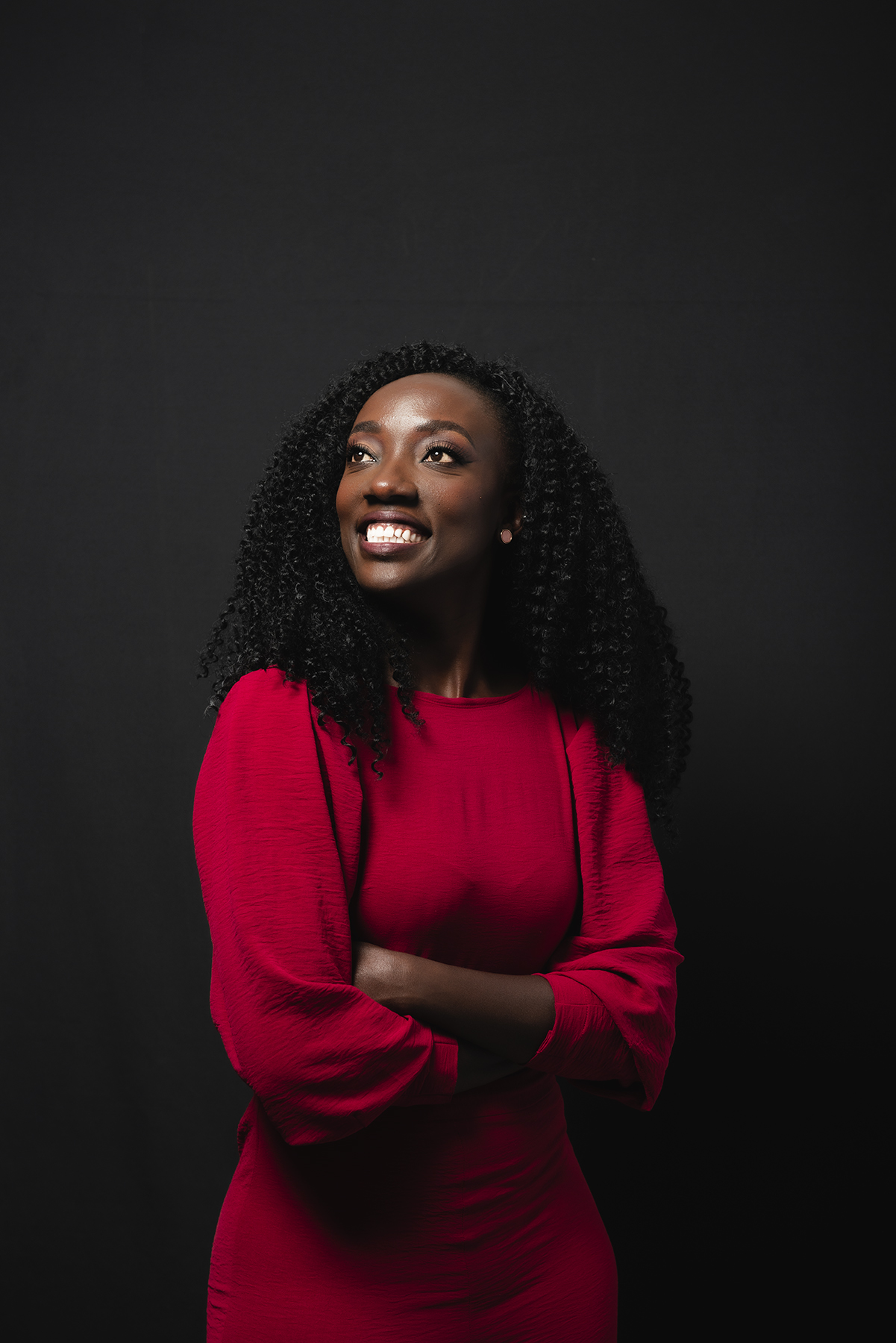
- Born: 1987 or 1988 (age 38–39); Kilembe, Uganda
- Education: Kibuli Secondary School; Makerere University; Sports Business Institute Barcelona
- Occupations: Sports Journalist, Analyst and Commentator
- Awards: 2019 Top 100 Most Influential Young Africans 2020 Momentum gsport Award: "African Woman in Sport" 2021 500 Most Influential Africans in the World

Usher Komugisha (born 1987 or 1988 (age 38–39)) is a Ugandan sports journalist and commentator, who is also a former athlete. With 15 years of experience as a multi-media journalist, she has worked with international outlets including Al Jazeera, BBC, CNN, ESPN, International Basketball Federation (FIBA), Sky Sports and SuperSport. She is a commentator with the Basketball Africa League (BAL). In the 2020 Momentum gsport Awards, she was the inaugural winner of the category "African Woman in Sport" in Johannesburg, South Africa.

== Biography ==
=== Early years and education ===
Usher Komugisha was born in Kilembe, in present-day Kasese District, western Uganda, and has two older siblings: her brother Campbell Nagaba and sister Mellisa Fiona. Her parents were athletic, and she said in a 2020 interview: "I have always loved sports from my childhood and because my parents introduced me to reading books and daily newspapers from a very young age, I always wanted to be the girl that knows information before everyone else so that I can tell them in detail. When I look back, that actually moulded me into being a journalist."

Throughout her schooling, she played many sports, including dodgeball, volleyball, netball, lawn tennis, cycling, golf, as well as excelling at track; when she attended Kibuli Secondary School, the basketball coach - a legend of Ugandan Basketball, Eric Malinga, inspired her to play the game seriously, and she continued to be a basketball player after leaving school. She won the National Schools Championship in 2006 and represented Uganda at the East Africa Secondary School Games that summer in Dar es Salaam, Tanzania. She went on to Makerere University to study for a Bachelor of Arts in Economics degree, but decided to quit and immerse herself fully in sports journalism by learning on the job. She holds a master's in football business management from the Sports Business Institute, Barcelona after graduating in June 2023.

=== Career ===
In October 2008, on a visit to Power FM Studios, Komugisha was asked by renowned media personality Mark Ssali to speak on air about basketball, and the following year on the recommendation of his fellow pundit Joseph Kabuleta, she began reporting sports in the New Vision thanks to an opportunity by the then Sports Editor Louis Jadwong. The International Sports Press Association (AIPS) recommended her to cover the 2012 London Olympics after a successful mentorship program at the 2011 World University Games in Shenzhen, China thanks to the International University Sports Federation (FISU). She worked in Uganda until August 2013, when she took up a job in Kigali, Rwanda.

Komugisha has covered several major sporting events including the 2019 FIBA Basketball World Cup, and three Africa Cup of Nations (AFCON) editions among others.

In 2021, she commentated the inaugural game of the Basketball Africa League (BAL) in Kigali.

In November - December 2022, she was a TV analyst for Al Jazeera at the FIFA World Cup in Qatar alongside renowned media gurus Gemma Soler from Spain and Colombian Juan Arango.

Usher is also an international moderator and host of high level events like the sports panel with the FIFA President Gianni Infantino and CAF President Dr Patrice Motsepe at the 2022 Commonwealth Business Forum at the Commonwealth Heads of Government Meeting in Kigali, Rwanda. She also moderated the inaugural Moving Sports Forward Forum in the same year organised by the Toronto Raptors President Masai Ujiri in Kigali, Rwanda.

She is passionate about mentoring young women and men who are seeking to pursue careers in sports especially across the African continent.
