= Opio (surname) =

Opio is a surname. Notable people with the surname include:

- Asinisi Fina Opio (born 1986), Ugandan biomedical scientist
- Gabriel Opio (born 1945), Ugandan economist and politician
- Joe Opio, Ugandan comedian and television writer
- John Opio (born 1951), Ugandan boxer
