= African Para-Badminton Championships =

Badminton championships

- Most recent season or competition: 2025
- Founder: Para Badminton World Federation (now part of the BWF)
- First season: 2018

The African Para-Badminton Championships is a tournament organized by the Para Badminton World Federation (PBWF) which has now merged with the BWF. This tournament is hosted to crown the best para-badminton players in Africa.

The inaugural edition of the tournament was hosted in Kampala, Uganda in 2018.

== Championships ==
=== Individual championships ===
The table below states all the host cities (and their countries) of the African Championships.

Year	Number	Host City	Host country	Events
2018	1	Kampala	Uganda	18
2020	Cancelled	Kampala	Uganda	Cancelled
2022	2	Kampala	Uganda	21
2023	3	Kampala	Uganda	
2025	4	Abia State	Nigeria	
2027	5	Kampala	Uganda	

== All-time medal table ==
Rank	Nation	Gold	Silver	Bronze	Total
1	Nigeria (NGR)	24	19	16.5	59.5
2	Egypt (EGY)	21.5	10.5	12	44
3	Uganda (UGA)	8	18	31.5	57.5
4	DR Congo (DRC)	3.5	2.5	0.5	6.5
5	Kenya (KEN)	3	4	7.5	14.5
6	Ivory Coast (CIV)	2.5	1	7.5	11
7	Benin (BEN)	1	3.5	1.5	6
8	Ghana (GHA)	0.5	0	9	9.5
9	Cameroon (CMR)	0	2.5	9	11.5
10	Zambia (ZAM)	0	1	6	7
11	Burundi (BDI)	0	1	2	3
12	Togo (TOG)	0	1	0.5	1.5
13	Burkina Faso (BUR)	0	0	1	1
14	Central African Republic (CAR)	0	0	0.5	0.5
14	Rwanda (RWA)	0	0	0.5	0.5
14	Senegal (SEN)	0	0	0.5	0.5
Totals (16 entries)		64	64	106	234

== Past winners ==
=== 2018 Kampala ===
The first edition of the championships was hosted in Kampala, Uganda. Nigeria became the best country in this edition of the championships, having won a total of 7 gold medals and 5 silver medals in the championships.

Event	Gold	Silver	Bronze
Men's singles WH2	(Nigeria) Seyi Dada Dixon	(Egypt) Atef Abdelkarim Mahmoud	(Egypt) Nasr Youssif Elsayed
Men's singles WH2	(Nigeria) Seyi Dada Dixon	(Egypt) Atef Abdelkarim Mahmoud	(Ghana) Bismark Kyei
Men's singles SL3	(Nigeria) Chukwuebuka Sunday Eze	(Uganda) Julius Masereka	(Kenya) Edwin Muruah Mwangi
Men's singles SL3	(Nigeria) Chukwuebuka Sunday Eze	(Uganda) Julius Masereka	(Uganda) Paddy Kizza Kasirye
Men's singles SL4	(Nigeria) Rafio Oyebanji Bello	(Egypt) Zakareia Elsayed Abdo Ayoub	(Uganda) Charles Kalega Kizza
Men's singles SL4	(Nigeria) Rafio Oyebanji Bello	(Egypt) Zakareia Elsayed Abdo Ayoub	(Uganda) Hassan Kamoga
Men's singles SU5	(Egypt) Mohamed Shaaban Abdelgawa Ismail	(Nigeria) Umar Baba Pate	(Ghana) Azumah Salih Mohammed
Men's singles SU5	(Egypt) Mohamed Shaaban Abdelgawa Ismail	(Nigeria) Umar Baba Pate	(Uganda) George Byarugaba
Singles SH6	(Egypt) Yasmina Eissa	(Kenya) Jeremia Ngungi Maringa	(Egypt) Mona Salah Sayed Abdelham Ghallab
Singles SH6	(Egypt) Yasmina Eissa	(Kenya) Jeremia Ngungi Maringa	(Kenya) Ruth Mueni Nzioka
Doubles WH1–WH2	(Nigeria) Seyi Dada Dixon (Ghana) Bismark Kyei	(Egypt) Nasr Youssif Elsayed (Egypt) Atef Abdelkarim Mahmoud	(Egypt) Shaimaa Samy Abdellatif (Kenya) Asiya Mohammed Sururu
Doubles WH1–WH2	(Nigeria) Seyi Dada Dixon (Ghana) Bismark Kyei	(Egypt) Nasr Youssif Elsayed (Egypt) Atef Abdelkarim Mahmoud	(Ghana) Safia Furkan (Ghana) Akosua Nkansah
Men's doubles SL3–SL4	(Nigeria) Rafio Oyebanji Bello (Nigeria) Chukwuebuka Sunday Eze	(Uganda) Paddy Kizza Kasirye (Uganda) Charles Kalega Kizza	(Uganda) Bashir Mutyaba (Uganda) James Ongaria
Men's doubles SL3–SL4	(Nigeria) Rafio Oyebanji Bello (Nigeria) Chukwuebuka Sunday Eze	(Uganda) Paddy Kizza Kasirye (Uganda) Charles Kalega Kizza	(Uganda) Hassan Kamoga (Uganda) Julius Masereka
Women's singles WH2	(Egypt) Shaimaa Samy Abdellatif	(Kenya) Asiya Mohammed Sururu	(Ghana) Akosua Nkansah
Women's singles WH2	(Egypt) Shaimaa Samy Abdellatif	(Kenya) Asiya Mohammed Sururu	(Kenya) Fidelis Wanjiru Wanjuu
Women's singles SL3–SU5	(Nigeria) Gift Ijeoma Chukwuemeka	(Uganda) Elizabeth Mwesigwa	(Ghana) Naomi Sarpong
Women's singles SL3–SU5	(Nigeria) Gift Ijeoma Chukwuemeka	(Uganda) Elizabeth Mwesigwa	(Uganda) Rose Nansereko
Women's singles SL4–SU5	(Uganda) Khadija Khamuka	(Nigeria) Chinyere Lucky Okoro	(Ghana) Zinabu Issah
Women's singles SL4–SU5	(Uganda) Khadija Khamuka	(Nigeria) Chinyere Lucky Okoro	(Kenya) Asha Kipwene Munene
Women's doubles SL3–SU5	(Uganda) Khadija Khamuka (Uganda) Rose Nansereko	(Nigeria) Gift Ijeoma Chukwuemeka (Nigeria) Chinyere Lucky Okoro	(Ghana) Zinabu Issah (Ghana) Naomi Sarpong
Mixed doubles WH1–WH2	(Egypt) Atef Abdelkarim Mahmoud (Egypt) Asiya Mohammed Sururu	(Egypt) Nasr Youssif Elsayed (Egypt) Shaimaa Samy Abdellatif	(Ghana) Felix Acheampong (Ghana) Akosua Nkansah
Mixed doubles SL3–SU5	(Nigeria) Rafio Oyebanji Bello (Uganda) Rose Nansereko	(Nigeria) Umar Baba Pate (Nigeria) Gift Ijeoma Chukwuemeka	(Ghana) Azumah Salih Mohammed (Ghana) Naomi Sarpong
Mixed doubles SL3–SU5	(Nigeria) Rafio Oyebanji Bello (Uganda) Rose Nansereko	(Nigeria) Umar Baba Pate (Nigeria) Gift Ijeoma Chukwuemeka	(Egypt) Zakareia Ayoub (Uganda) Khadija Khamuka

=== 2022 Kampala ===
Kampala would host the games for a second time in 2022 after the 2020 edition was cancelled as a result of the COVID-19 pandemic. The Egyptian team won 8 golds, 2 silvers and 3 bronzes in this edition.

Event	Gold	Silver	Bronze
Men's singles WH1	(Egypt) Mohamed Rashad Ahmed	(Egypt) Omar Gaber Ahmed	(Ivory Coast) Djenon Emmanuel Djah
Men's singles WH1	(Egypt) Mohamed Rashad Ahmed	(Egypt) Omar Gaber Ahmed	(Uganda) Brian Mugabe
Men's singles WH2	(Ivory Coast) Kouakou Bernard Ettien	(Uganda) Daniel Kizza	(Uganda) Kevin Mubiru
Men's singles SL3	(Ivory Coast) Deada Jean Yves Yao	(Cameroon) Emmanuel Pinochet Amougui	(Egypt) Walid Abdelghany Elsaied
Men's singles SL3	(Ivory Coast) Deada Jean Yves Yao	(Cameroon) Emmanuel Pinochet Amougui	(Uganda) Godfrey Katalo
Men's singles SL4	(Uganda) Hassan Mubiru	(Uganda) Charles Kalega Kizza	(Egypt) Joun Khaled Lotfy
Men's singles SL4	(Uganda) Hassan Mubiru	(Uganda) Charles Kalega Kizza	(Cameroon) Etienne Songa Bidjocka
Men's singles SU5	(Democratic Republic of the Congo) Prince Mamvumvu-Kidila	(Egypt) Mohamed Shaaban Abdelgawa Ismail	(Egypt) Ahmed Eldakrory
Singles SH6	(Egypt) Yasmina Eissa	(Democratic Republic of the Congo) Bob Nkanga Pembele	(Ivory Coast) Abiba Bakayoko
Men's doubles WH1–WH2	(Egypt) Omar Gaber Ahmed (Egypt) Mohamed Rashad Ahmed	(Uganda) Daniel Kizza (Uganda) Brian Mugabe	(Ivory Coast) Djenon Emmanuel Djah (Ivory Coast) Kouakou Bernard Ettien
Men's doubles SL3–SL4	(Egypt) Walid Abdelghany Elsaied (Egypt) Joun Khaled Lotfy	(Cameroon) Emmanuel Pinochet Amougui (Cameroon) Etienne Songa Bidjocka	(Uganda) Godfrey Katalo (Uganda) Latif Ngobi
Men's doubles SL3–SL4	(Egypt) Walid Abdelghany Elsaied (Egypt) Joun Khaled Lotfy	(Cameroon) Emmanuel Pinochet Amougui (Cameroon) Etienne Songa Bidjocka	(Uganda) Charles Kalega Kizza (Uganda) Julius Masereka
Men's doubles SU5	(Democratic Republic of the Congo) Prince Mamvumvu-Kidila (Uganda) Hassan Mubiru	(Egypt) Ahmed Eldakrory (Egypt) Mohamed Shaaban Abdelgawa Ismail	(Uganda) Willy Kalinaki (Uganda) Jonathan Ochan
Women's singles WH1	(Egypt) Shaimaa Samy Abdellatif	(Uganda) Sarah Nazziwa	(Uganda) Flavia Basuuta
Women's singles WH2	(Democratic Republic of the Congo) Frida Ditu Kizinga	(Democratic Republic of the Congo) Wivine Moyo Bangudulu	(Uganda) Pamela Banura
Women's singles WH2	(Democratic Republic of the Congo) Frida Ditu Kizinga	(Democratic Republic of the Congo) Wivine Moyo Bangudulu	(Ivory Coast) Douayra Prisca Marie Trey
Women's singles SL3	(Uganda) Elizabeth Mwesigwa	(Uganda) Rose Nansereko	(Ivory Coast) Massere Junior Beda
Women's singles SL3	(Uganda) Elizabeth Mwesigwa	(Uganda) Rose Nansereko	(Zambia) Martha Chewe
Women's singles SL4	(Egypt) Sherine Adel Fahmy	(Burundi) Evelyne Manishimwe	(Zambia) Vienna Hamuchenje
Women's singles SL4	(Egypt) Sherine Adel Fahmy	(Burundi) Evelyne Manishimwe	(Burundi) Pelagie Niyonzima
Women's singles SU5	(Uganda) Ritah Asiimwe	(Uganda) Sumini Mutesi	(Zambia) Josephine Zulu
Women's doubles WH1–WH2	(Egypt) Shaimaa Samy Abdellatif (Ivory Coast) Douayra Prisca Marie Trey	(Uganda) Brenda Nabukenya (Uganda) Sarah Nazziwa	(Uganda) Pamela Banura (Uganda) Cissy Nagawa
Women's doubles WH1–WH2	(Egypt) Shaimaa Samy Abdellatif (Ivory Coast) Douayra Prisca Marie Trey	(Uganda) Brenda Nabukenya (Uganda) Sarah Nazziwa	(Uganda) Flavia Basuuta (Uganda) Jennifer Bumali Kabuwo
Women's doubles SL3–SU5	(Uganda) Ritah Asiimwe (Uganda) Elizabeth Mwesigwa	(Uganda) Sumini Mutesi (Uganda) Rose Nansereko	(Burundi) Evelyne Manishimwe (Burundi) Pelagie Niyonzima
Women's doubles SL3–SU5	(Uganda) Ritah Asiimwe (Uganda) Elizabeth Mwesigwa	(Uganda) Sumini Mutesi (Uganda) Rose Nansereko	(Ivory Coast) Massere Junior Beda (Central African Republic) Ketsia Ambare
Mixed doubles WH1–WH2	(Egypt) Mohamed Rashad Ahmed (Egypt) Shaimaa Samy Abdellatif	(Ivory Coast) Djenon Emmanuel Djah (Ivory Coast) Douayra Prisca Marie Trey	(Uganda) Daniel Kizza (Uganda) Sarah Nazziwa
Mixed doubles WH1–WH2	(Egypt) Mohamed Rashad Ahmed (Egypt) Shaimaa Samy Abdellatif	(Ivory Coast) Djenon Emmanuel Djah (Ivory Coast) Douayra Prisca Marie Trey	(Uganda) Brian Mugabe (Uganda) Brenda Nabukenya
Mixed doubles SL3–SU5	(Egypt) Walid Abdelghany Elsaied (Egypt) Sherine Adel Fahmy	(Democratic Republic of the Congo) Prince Mamvumvu-Kidila (Zambia) Martha Chewe	(Egypt) Mohamed Shaaban Abdelgawa Ismail (Zambia) Lucy Kamanga
Mixed doubles SL3–SU5	(Egypt) Walid Abdelghany Elsaied (Egypt) Sherine Adel Fahmy	(Democratic Republic of the Congo) Prince Mamvumvu-Kidila (Zambia) Martha Chewe	(Uganda) Hassan Mubiru (Uganda) Elizabeth Mwesigwa

=== 2023 Kampala ===
Kampala would host the games for a third time in 2023.

Event	Gold	Silver	Bronze
Men's singles WH2	(Egypt) Mohamed Hassan Farrag	(Egypt) Atef Abdelkarim Mahmoud	(Nigeria) Ifeanacho Emmanuel Ohaeri
Men's singles WH2	(Egypt) Mohamed Hassan Farrag	(Egypt) Atef Abdelkarim Mahmoud	(Uganda) Ali Mukasa
Men's singles SL3	(Nigeria) Chukwuebuka Sunday Eze	(Nigeria) Gbenga Sunday Olanipekun	(Cameroon) Emmanuel Pinochet Amougui
Men's singles SL3	(Nigeria) Chukwuebuka Sunday Eze	(Nigeria) Gbenga Sunday Olanipekun	(Ivory Coast) Deada Jean Yves Yao
Men's singles SL4	(Nigeria) Chigozie Jeremiah Nnanna	(Uganda) Hassan Mubiru	(Cameroon) Etienne Songa Bidjocka
Men's singles SL4	(Nigeria) Chigozie Jeremiah Nnanna	(Uganda) Hassan Mubiru	(Egypt) Joun Khaled Lotfy
Men's singles SU5	(Egypt) Mohamed Shaaban Abdelgawa Ismail	(Togo) Ayao Severin Kansa	
Men's doubles SL3–SL4	(Nigeria) James Thompson Akpan (Nigeria) Gbenga Sunday Olanipekun	(Uganda) Hassan Mubiru (Uganda) David Mukisa	(Ivory Coast) Yao Andre Amani (Ivory Coast) Deada Jean Yves Yao
Men's doubles SL3–SL4	(Nigeria) James Thompson Akpan (Nigeria) Gbenga Sunday Olanipekun	(Uganda) Hassan Mubiru (Uganda) David Mukisa	(Uganda) Godfrey Katalo (Uganda) Latif Ngobi
Men's doubles SU5	(Nigeria) Chukwuebuka Sunday Eze (Nigeria) Chigozie Jeremiah Nnanna	(Egypt) Walid Abdelghany Elessawy (Egypt) Mohamed Shaaban Abdelgawa Ismail	(Cameroon) Emmanuel Pinochet Amougui (Cameroon) Etienne Songa Bidjocka
Men's doubles SU5	(Nigeria) Chukwuebuka Sunday Eze (Nigeria) Chigozie Jeremiah Nnanna	(Egypt) Walid Abdelghany Elessawy (Egypt) Mohamed Shaaban Abdelgawa Ismail	(Senegal) Mamadou Aidara (Togo) Ayao Severin Kansa
Women's singles WH1	(Uganda) Sarah Nazziwa	(Uganda) Flavia Basuuta	(Zambia) Chipego Siadindi
Women's singles WH2	(Egypt) Shaimaa Samy Abdellatif	(Nigeria) Gift Ijeoma Chukwuemeka	(Cameroon) Irene Mbiayuk Nkwa
Women's singles WH2	(Egypt) Shaimaa Samy Abdellatif	(Nigeria) Gift Ijeoma Chukwuemeka	(Uganda) Rebecca Kasinre
Women's singles SL3	(Nigeria) Mariam Eniola Bolaji	(Uganda) Elizabeth Mwesigwa	(Zambia) Martha Chewe
Women's singles SL3	(Nigeria) Mariam Eniola Bolaji	(Uganda) Elizabeth Mwesigwa	(Uganda) Rose Nansereko
Women's singles SL4–SU5	(Nigeria) Chinyere Lucky Okoro	(Benin) Amandine Morenike Oloukou	(Uganda) Harriet Nakayima
Women's singles SL4–SU5	(Nigeria) Chinyere Lucky Okoro	(Benin) Amandine Morenike Oloukou	(Uganda) Sumini Mutesi
Women's doubles SL3–SU5	(Nigeria) Mariam Eniola Bolaji (Nigeria) Chinyere Lucky Okoro	(Uganda) Sumini Mutesi (Uganda) Rose Nansereko	(Zambia) Martha Chewe (Benin) Amandine Morenike Oloukou
Women's doubles SL3–SU5	(Nigeria) Mariam Eniola Bolaji (Nigeria) Chinyere Lucky Okoro	(Uganda) Sumini Mutesi (Uganda) Rose Nansereko	(Uganda) Ritah Asiimwe (Uganda) Elizabeth Mwesigwa
Mixed doubles WH1–WH2	(Egypt) Atef Abdelkarim Mahmoud (Egypt) Shaimaa Samy Abdellatif	(Uganda) Ali Mukasa (Uganda) Sarah Nazziwa	(Uganda) Charles Mutebi (Uganda) Jennifer Bumali Kabuwo
Mixed doubles WH1–WH2	(Egypt) Atef Abdelkarim Mahmoud (Egypt) Shaimaa Samy Abdellatif	(Uganda) Ali Mukasa (Uganda) Sarah Nazziwa	(Nigeria) Ifeanacho Emmanuel Ohaeri (Uganda) Sylivia Nakanda
Mixed doubles SL3–SU5	(Nigeria) Chigozie Jeremiah Nnanna (Nigeria) Mariam Eniola Bolaji	(Egypt) Mohamed Shaaban Abdelgawad Ismail (Zambia) Martha Chewe	(Uganda) Charles Kalega Kizza (Uganda) Rose Nansereko
Mixed doubles SL3–SU5	(Nigeria) Chigozie Jeremiah Nnanna (Nigeria) Mariam Eniola Bolaji	(Egypt) Mohamed Shaaban Abdelgawad Ismail (Zambia) Martha Chewe	(Nigeria) Gbenga Sunday Olanipekun (Nigeria) Chinyere Lucky Okoro
Doubles WH1–WH2	(Egypt) Mohamed Hassan Farrag (Egypt) Atef Abdelkarim Mahmoud	(Uganda) Brian Mugabe (Uganda) Ali Mukasa	(Uganda) Pamela Banura (Uganda) Jennifer Bumali Kabuwo
Doubles WH1–WH2	(Egypt) Mohamed Hassan Farrag (Egypt) Atef Abdelkarim Mahmoud	(Uganda) Brian Mugabe (Uganda) Ali Mukasa	(Egypt) Shaimaa Samy Abdellatif (Uganda) Sarah Nazziwa

=== 2025 Abia State ===
Abia State would host the games for the first time in 2025.

Event	Gold	Silver	Bronze
Men's singles WH1	(Egypt) Mohamed Rashad Ahmed	(Nigeria) Abel Seun David	(Nigeria) Martin C. Nwankwere
Men's singles WH1	(Egypt) Mohamed Rashad Ahmed	(Nigeria) Abel Seun David	(Nigeria) Nmeribe Okpulor
Men's singles WH2	(Egypt) Mohamed Hassan Farrag	(Nigeria) Ifeanacho Emmanuel Ohaeri	(Nigeria) Okechukwe Ibeabuchi
Men's singles WH2	(Egypt) Mohamed Hassan Farrag	(Nigeria) Ifeanacho Emmanuel Ohaeri	(Nigeria) Victor I. Ozurumba
Men's singles SL3	(Nigeria) Chukwuebuka Sunday Eze	(Nigeria) Obinna Preciuos Nwosu	(Nigeria) Jonathan Christopher
Men's singles SL3	(Nigeria) Chukwuebuka Sunday Eze	(Nigeria) Obinna Preciuos Nwosu	(Nigeria) Gbenga Sunday Olanipekun
Men's singles SL4	(Nigeria) Chigozie Jeremiah Nnanna	(Nigeria) James Thompson Akpan	(Kenya) Benson Nduva Mutiso
Men's singles SL4	(Nigeria) Chigozie Jeremiah Nnanna	(Nigeria) James Thompson Akpan	(Cameroon) Etienne Songa Bidjocka
Men's singles SU5	(Democratic Republic of the Congo) Prince Mamvumvu-Kidila	(Nigeria) Munkwoba Tala Goman	(Egypt) Mohamed Shaaban Abdelgawa Ismail
Men's singles SU5	(Democratic Republic of the Congo) Prince Mamvumvu-Kidila	(Nigeria) Munkwoba Tala Goman	(Kenya) Caleb Omolo
Men's doubles WH1–WH2	(Egypt) Mohamed Hassan Farrag (Egypt) Mohamed Rashad Ahmed	(Nigeria) Seyi Dada Dixon (Nigeria) Abel Seun David	(Nigeria) Martin C. Nwankwere (Nigeria) Victor I. Ozurumba
Men's doubles SL3–SL4	(Nigeria) Chigozie Jeremiah Nnanna (Nigeria) Obinna Preciuos Nwosu	(Nigeria) James Thompson Akpan (Nigeria) Chukwuebuka Sunday Eze	(Nigeria) Yahaya Ayuba (Nigeria) Gbenga Sunday Olanipekun
Men's doubles SU5	(Nigeria) Munkwoba Tala Goman (Nigeria) Bello Ibrahim Tukur	(Kenya) Benson Nduva Mutiso (Kenya) Caleb Omolo	(Egypt) Mohamed Shaaban Abdelgawa Ismail (Egypt) Joun Khaled Lotfy
Women's singles WH1	(Nigeria) Mary Mabwat Nathan	(Nigeria) Ebikonboere Lyka Brown	(Nigeria) Hannah Theophilus
Women's singles WH2	(Nigeria) Gift Ijeoma Chukwuemeka	(Egypt) Shaimaa Samy Abdellatif	(Cameroon) Irene Mbiayuk Nkwa
Women's singles WH2	(Nigeria) Gift Ijeoma Chukwuemeka	(Egypt) Shaimaa Samy Abdellatif	(Nigeria) Chioma Onyebuchi
Women's singles SL3	(Nigeria) Mariam Eniola Bolaji	(Nigeria) Odinakachi Uwalaka	(Cameroon) Danyele Cendrah Makeu Mouafo
Women's singles SL4	(Nigeria) Chinyere Lucky Okoro	(Nigeria) Nendirmwa Monday	(Egypt) Basmala Hashim Hassan
Women's singles SU5	(Kenya) Neema Stency	(Benin) Amandine Morenike Oloukou	(Egypt) Rahma Ahmed Abdou
Women's singles SU5	(Kenya) Neema Stency	(Benin) Amandine Morenike Oloukou	(Nigeria) Ogechi J. Nwachukwu
Women's doubles WH1–WH2	(Nigeria) Gift Ijeoma Chukwuemeka (Nigeria) Mary Mabwat Nathan	(Nigeria) Hannah Theophilus (Nigeria) Amaechi Silver Ukagba	(Burkina Faso) Ouedraogo Nebnoma Marie-Kevine (Cameroon) Irene Mbiayuk Nkwa
Women's doubles SL3–SU5	(Kenya) Elizabeth Nabwire Ouma (Kenya) Neema Stency	(Cameroon) Danyele Cendrah Makeu Mouafo (Benin) Amandine Morenike Oloukou	(Nigeria) Blessing Iroanya (Nigeria) Nemdirmwa Monday
Mixed doubles WH1–WH2	(Egypt) Mohamed Rashad Ahmed (Egypt) Shaimaa Samy Abdellatif	(Nigeria) Ifeanacho Emmanuel Ohaeri (Nigeria) Ebikonboere Lyka Brown	(Rwanda) Jean D'Amour Ndahiro (Burkina Faso) Ouedraogo Nebnoma Marie-Kevine
Mixed doubles SL3–SU5	(Nigeria) Chigozie Jeremiah Nnanna (Nigeria) Mariam Eniola Bolaji	(Nigeria) James Thompson Akpan (Nigeria) Chinyere Lucky Okoro	(Kenya) Benson Nduva Mutiso (Kenya) Mary Nduku
Mixed doubles SL3–SU5	(Nigeria) Chigozie Jeremiah Nnanna (Nigeria) Mariam Eniola Bolaji	(Nigeria) James Thompson Akpan (Nigeria) Chinyere Lucky Okoro	(Democratic Republic of the Congo) Prince Mamvumvu-Kidila (Cameroon) Danyele Cendrah Makeu Mouafo
Singles SH6	(Kenya) Anthony Ojwang Otwal	(Benin) Edgard Houkpe	(Nigeria) Precious Oluwasemilore Adegoke
Singles SH6	(Kenya) Anthony Ojwang Otwal	(Benin) Edgard Houkpe	(Benin) Abdoul Farid Boukary
Doubles SH6	(Benin) Abdoul Farid Boukary (Benin) Edgard Houkpe	(Kenya) Corrine Mwaniga (Kenya) Anthony Ojwang Otwal	(Nigeria) Precious Oluwasemilore Adegoke (Nigeria) Godwin Tochukwu Ezulumike

== See also ==
- African Badminton Championships
