= Stephen Isabalija =

Ugandan civil servant/academic (born 1976)

- Born: 23 November 1976 (age 49); Fort Portal, Uganda
- Education: Makerere University Business School (Diploma in Business Studies); Makerere University (BComm) (MBA); Southern University (PhD in International Development)
- Occupations: Civil servant; management professional; accountant and academic
- Years active: 1999–present
- Title: Former Permanent Secretary in the Uganda Ministry of Energy and Mineral Development

Stephen Robert Isabalija is a Ugandan civil servant, management professional, accountant, academic and academic administrator. He is the immediate past permanent secretary in the Ministry of Energy and Mineral Development in Uganda, having served in that capacity from November 2016, until his termination on 24 August 2017.

Prior to that, he served as the vice chancellor of Victoria University Uganda, a private, for-profit university owned by the Ruparelia Group, a business conglomerate in East Africa. He served in that capacity from September 2013 until November 2016.

== Background ==
Isabalija was born in Fort Portal, Kabarole District, on 23 November 1976, to Chris Nyakahuma (deceased) and Lorraine K. Waako Akiiki (deceased).

== Education ==
Isabalija attended Kinyamasika Demonstration School, in Fort Portal for his elementary school. For his O-Level education, he attended St. Leo’s College Kyegobe, also in Fort Portal. He transferred to Makerere College School, in Kampala, Uganda's capital and largest city, for his A-Level studies. From 1996 until 1998, he attended Nakawa College of Business Studies, the name of the institution that was the precursor of Makerere University Business School (MUBS). In 1997, he enrolled in the Bachelor of Commerce degree program at the main campus of Makerere University, graduating in 2001. For one year in 1998, he juggled degree classes at Makerere and diploma classes at Nakawa. Between 2002 and 2004, he studied for the degree of Master of Business Administration (MBA) in Finance and Accounting, at Makerere University, Main Campus. His degree of Doctor of Philosophy (PhD) in Public Policy (International Development), was obtained in 2011, from Southern University, in New Orleans, Louisiana, United States.

== Work history ==
Isabalija started his career in 1999 immediately after finishing his diploma in business studies. He was a finance specialist, and rose to the rank of Head of accounts at the ministry of water and environment (JPF).

In 2005, he was hired as lecturer in the graduate school and rose to the rank to senior lecturer at Makerere University Business School (MUBS). He was appointed vice chancellor of Victoria University in 2013.

Besides his responsibilities at Victoria University, Uganda Electricity Generation Company Limited and Uganda Development Bank, he sits on the boards of Dynamic Group, where he is the chairman; ICT University Foundation; Christian Discipleship Ministries International; ICT Centre, Makerere University Business School; and Uganda Women’s Entrepreneurship Association, where he is a delegate.

On 4 November 2016, he was appointed the permanent secretary of the Ministry of Energy and Mineral Development, replacing Kabagambe Kaliisa, who became a presidential adviser on energy.

== Academic authorship ==
Isabalija's research has been published in peer reviewed journals. Topics of his articles include:

- Factors affecting adoption, implementation and sustainability of Telemedicine information systems in Uganda. This study identified and discussed the key requirements for sustainable telemedicine in Uganda.
- A theoretical framework on the antecedents of E-Medicine sustainability in Sub-Saharan Africa: A mixed approach.
- SME adoption of enterprise systems in Sub-Saharan Africa: A clarion call to action.
- A framework for designing sustainable telemedicine information systems in developing countries.
- A framework for sustainable implementation of e-medicine in transitioning countries.
- A comparative study of e-Medicine uptake in Uganda, Nigeria and Ethiopia.

== Other responsibilities ==
Isabalija sits on the board of directors of Uganda Development Bank (UDB). He is a married father of four children .

== See also ==
- List of university leaders in Uganda
