= Futsal Association of Uganda =

National governing body of futsal in Uganda

FAU
- Futsal Association of Uganda
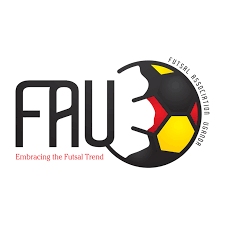
- Futsal Association Of Uganda logo
- Abbreviation: FAU
- Founded: 1 January 2015; 11 years ago
- Founded at: Kampala, Uganda
- Type: Federation of national associations
- Legal status: Not-for-profit
- Headquarters: Mengo, Kampala
- Region served: Uganda
- Official languages: English, French, German, Spanish
- President: Hamzah Jjunju
- CEO: Ibrahim Mugera
- Head Of Communication: Watimba Moses
- Website: fau.co.ug

The Futsal Association of Uganda (FAU) is the national governing body of futsal in Uganda. Since 2019 it has been an associate member of the Federation of Uganda Football Associations (FUFA). FAU had its first annual general meeting on 12 September 2019 at Kenedia Hotel Kampala.

== Futsal History ==
FAU was founded in 2015, and the core founding members were Jjunju Hamzah, Lugemwa Patrick, Nandigobe Richard Semanda, and Pius Serugo to open up and diversifying the football sector as well to enhance the skills of footballers and it was developed as a sport on its own. Idea of the game in Uganda was brought to table by Jjunju Hamzah after his interaction with the Talib Hilal (FIFA Futsal Instructor) from Oman in December 2014. It was Talib Hilals insights about Futsal that opened up Jjunju Hamzah mind towards the opportunities it would give Ugandans hence taking up the task to have it formally played in the country. Upon actualization the game has been played through a number of competitions like Futsal Corporate gala 2015 and 2016, Futsal University gala 2015, Futsal Mini League 2016, Futsal Super league 2017 to date, Futsal Uganda Cup 2017-date and the Futsal Super Cup 2017 to date.

=== Futsal University ===
This was the first Futsal University competition which was organized by FAU and it took place at Lugogo Arena on18th March 2015. Three Universities participated Makerere University Business School, Kampala International University and Makerere University. Makerere University Business School were the eventual winners of the challenge.

=== Futsal Corporate Gala ===
The first Futsal Cooperate Gala was held in 2015, and it featured 3 teams, NBS TV, FUFA and Wazei. The 2015 edition was won by Wazei Futsal Team, while the 2016 Edition show the emergency of 12 companies and the event was won by Coca Cola Uganda.

=== Futsal League ===
The first Futsal mini league was organized by FAU, the matches were played at Lugogo Indoor Arena on Tuesday night. The league ran from March 2016 to 11 May 2016, it comprised nine teams and Sauna Futsal Club were crowned as the winners. As of 2019, FAU runs two Futsal competitions (Futsal Super League and Futsal Uganda Cup) and the matches were played on Tuesday and Thursday evening nights.

== Futsal facilities ==
Various facilities have been set up by both individuals and government for the smooth running of the game; such as International Futsal Court at Mengo, Lugogo Arena, Busega Futsal Arena, Inter Kyebando Futsal pitch in Kyebando, five aside Arena Buwatte, Bayern Arena Sports Complex in Munyonyo.

== Media ==
Futsal in Uganda media has been covered in news (both in prints and online version) as well on radios, televisions especially during sports programs. FAU got various accounts on social media link Facebook, Twitter and Instagram as a way of communicating and interacting with various stake holders in the game.

== Partnerships ==
FAU has made various partnerships with different companies in Uganda such as; In November 2020, made a partnership with Uganda Youth Football Association to support youth teams, organizing Futsal Coaching courses and Futsal referees’ courses. In December 2020, signed a partnership with Sport Edge (an event management company) and Deep End Sports Media (a live broadcast company).

== Teams ==
Team	Location	Metropolitan Area
Men's Professional Teams
Park F.C.	Mengo	Kampala
Yeak F.C.	Rubaga	Kampala
Aidenal F.C.	Entebbe	Wakiso
Mengo F.C.	Mengo	Kampala
Dreamline F.C.	Wakiso	Wakiso District
KJT F.C.	Kampala	Kampala
Luzira Thunders F.C.	Luzira	Kampala
Parakeets F.C.	Mengo	Kampala
Riham F.C.	Kawempe	Kampala
KPSG F.C.	Kawempe	Kampala
Elephants F.C.	Kampala	Kampala
Bajim F.C.	Mengo	Kampala
Kabowa United F.C.	Rubaga	Kampala
Yap F.C.	Mengo	Kampala
MUBS FC	Nakawa	Kampala

== Champions ==
=== Futsal Super League ===
FSL
Season	Champion	Runner-up	Result
2016	Sauna FC	Typhoon F.C.	5-1
2017/18	Dream F.C.	KSPG F.C.	7-3
2018/19	Yeak F.C.	Crown F.C.	3-2
2019/20	Post ponned	P.P	P.P

=== Futsal Uganda Cup ===
FUgC
Season	Champion
2017/18	Luzira Thunders FC
2018/19	Dream F.C.
2019/20	Postponned

=== Futsal Super Cup ===
FsC
Season	Champion
2017/18	Mengo City FC
2018/19	Luzira Thunders F.C.
2019/20	Postponned
