= Kassim Nakibinge =

Titular Mufti Of Uganda (born c. 1966)

Prince Kassim Nakibinge Kakungulu
- Born: Prince Kassim Nakibinge Kakungulu; 1966 (age 59–60); Uganda
- Education: United States International University (BA); University of Wales (MBA)
- Occupations: Businessman & bank executive
- Years active: 1989–present
- Title: Titular Mufti Of Uganda, Managing Director & CEO, Cairo International Bank
- Spouse: 1
- Father: Prince Badru Kakungulu
- Honors: Honorary PhD, University of Lahore

Prince Kassim Nakibinge Kakungulu is the Titular Mufti of Uganda, a role he inherited as a prominent member of the Buganda Royal Family. He is a Ugandan businessman and bank executive. He is also widely respected as a unifying moral authority and is an advocate for education and peaceful governance. He serves as the managing director and chief executive officer of Cairo International Bank, a commercial bank in the country.

== Background and education ==
He was born in the Central Region of Uganda circa 1966. His father is Badru Kakungulu (died 1991), a paternal uncle to Muwenda Mutebi II, the reigning Buganda monarch (since 1993).

He studied at Kabojja Preparatory School and Savio Junior School for his primary education. He attended St. Mary's College Kisubi for his O-Level studies, and Kibuli Secondary School for his A-Level education. He was admitted at the United States International University in San Diego, California to study business administration, graduating with a Bachelor of Arts in business administration. He pursued postgraduate education at the University of Wales in Cardiff, graduating with a Master of Business Administration degree, majoring in finance. In 2014, the University of Lahore in Pakistan bestowed upon him an honorary Doctor of Philosophy degree in recognition of his contribution to the promotion of the education of Muslims in Uganda.

== Career ==
In 1989, he joined the Bank of Uganda as a banking officer, working there until he retired in 2005 as a senior principal banking officer. He then joined Tropical Bank as an acting managing director and he later served as an executive managing director, resigning from that institution in 2013. In February 2016, he was appointed managing director at Cairo International Bank.

== Other considerations ==
He serves as the "titular head" of the Muslims in Uganda. Nakibinge is a married father.

== See also ==
- List of banks in Uganda
- Banking in Uganda
