= Elizabeth Mwesigwa =

Ugandan para-badminton player (born 1992)

Personal information
- Born: 10 March 1992 (age 34) Iganga District, Uganda

Sport
- Country: Uganda
- Sport: Badminton

Women's singles SL3 Women's doubles SL3–SU5 Mixed doubles SL3–SU5
- Highest ranking: 11 (WS 1 January 2019); 15 (WD with Ritah Asiimwe 3 October 2022); 20 (XD with Hassan Mubiru 8 November 2022)
- Current ranking: 12 (WS); 15 (WD with Ritah Asiimwe); 20 (XD with Hassan Mubiru) (15 November 2022)
Medal record
Women's para-badminton
Representing Uganda
African Championships
Gold medal – first place	2022 Kampala	Women's singles
Gold medal – first place	2022 Kampala	Women's doubles
Silver medal – second place	2018 Kampala	Women's singles
Silver medal – second place	2023 Kampala	Women's doubles
Bronze medal – third place	2022 Kampala	Mixed doubles
Bronze medal – third place	2023 Kampala	Women's singles

Elizabeth Mwesigwa (born 10 March 1992) is a Ugandan para-badminton player and she is ranked as the country's number one in the SL3 category. She won a gold medal at Uganda's para-badminton international in 2018. As of February 2020, she is ranked 12 worldwide in the Women's para-badminton SL3 Category by the Badminton World Federation.

== Background and education ==
Mwesigwa was born as the first of six children of Godfrey Kakaire, in Naigobya, Iganga District. She was born with a congenital defect that created an impairment of both legs below the knees. After undergoing an operation for her limbs in Tororo, Mwesigwa returned to Iganga and was enrolled at Iganga Infants School then Pride Academy Iganga which she left in 2009 after completing her Primary Leaving Examinations (PLE). In 2010, she moved to Kampala and joined Naguru High School but dropped out in 2011 in her first term of Senior Two.

She later supported herself as a hawker before relocating to Kigali, Rwanda in 2012.

== Sports ==
In 2013, Mwesigwa was introduced to sports through basketball during her stay in Kigali, Rwanda. On her return to Kampala in 2015, she featured in a number of wheelchair basketball games before attending a week-long training course with Richard Morris, an English para-badminton coach. She took up para-badminton, training through 2015 and 2016, and eventually featuring in her first tournament (Uganda Para-badminton International) in 2017 and winning a gold medal.

In 2018, Mwesigwa won a gold in the African Para-Badminton Championships held in Kampala, Uganda after beating Nigeria's Gift Ijeoma Chukwuemeka in the Women's SL3 final.

In 2019, she again represented Uganda at the second Fazza-Dubai Para-Badminton International.

=== Qualification for Olympics ===
In 2019, Mwesigwa was part of a 5-person Ugandan contingent that played at the TOTAL BWF Para-badminton World Championships that were held in Basel, Switzerland. She featured in the Women's SL3 Group B, the Women's SL3 – SU5 doubles (partnered with Asha Kipwene Munene) and also in the mixed doubles where she partnered with Paddy Kasirye.

Members of the Parliament of Uganda had earlier resolved to contribute US$10,000 that was to help her participate in tournaments in Thailand, France, Australia and Japan that would then help her gain points to qualify for the 2020 Paralympics.

== Awards and recognition ==
In 2019, Mwesigwa was named Tigress Honoree by the Malengo Foundation in recognition of her being Uganda's gold medal winner at the Para-African Badminton championships of 2018.

== Achievements ==
=== African Championships ===
Women's singles

Year	Venue	Opponent	Score	Result
2018 (Note: This tournament uses a round robin system.)	Lugogo Indoor Stadium, Kampala, Uganda	(Uganda) Rose Nansereko	21–11, 21–12	Silver
2018	Lugogo Indoor Stadium, Kampala, Uganda	(Ghana) Naomi Sarpong	21–16, 21–6	Silver
2018	Lugogo Indoor Stadium, Kampala, Uganda	(Nigeria) Gift Ijeoma Chukwuemeka	7–21, 18–21	Silver
2022	Lugogo Indoor Stadium, Kampala, Uganda	(Uganda) Rose Nansereko	21–9, 22–20	Gold
2023	Lugogo Indoor Stadium, Kampala, Uganda	(Nigeria) Mariam Eniola Bolaji	9–21, 4–21	Silver

Women's doubles

Year	Venue	Partner	Opponent	Score	Result
2022	Lugogo Indoor Stadium, Kampala, Uganda	(Uganda) Ritah Asiimwe	(Uganda) Sumini Mutesi (Uganda) Rose Nansereko	21–11, 21–16	Gold
2023	Lugogo Indoor Stadium, Kampala, Uganda	(Uganda) Ritah Asiimwe	(Nigeria) Mariam Eniola Bolaji (Nigeria) Chinyere Lucky Okoro	10–21, 7–21	Silver

Mixed doubles

Year	Venue	Partner	Opponent	Score	Result
2022	Lugogo Indoor Stadium, Kampala, Uganda	(Uganda) Hassan Mubiru	(Democratic Republic of the Congo) Prince Mamvumvu-Kidila (Zambia) Martha Chewe	21–12, 7–21, 9–21	Bronze

=== BWF Para Badminton World Circuit (1 runner-up) ===
The BWF Para Badminton World Circuit – Grade 2, Level 1, 2 and 3 tournaments has been sanctioned by the Badminton World Federation from 2022.

Women's singles

Year	Tournament	Level	Opponent	Score	Result
2022	Uganda Para Badminton International	Level 3	(India) Charanjeet Kaur	8–21, 9–21	(silver) Runner-up

=== International Tournaments (1 title) ===
Men's doubles

Year	Tournament	Partner	Opponent	Score	Result
2018 (Note: This tournament uses a round robin system.)	Uganda Para Badminton International	(Scotland) Mary Margaret Wilson	(Ghana) Zinabu Issah (Ghana) Naomi Sarpong	21–4, 21–7	(gold) Winner
2018	Uganda Para Badminton International	(Scotland) Mary Margaret Wilson	(Cameroon) Cristance Moffouo (Cameroon) Jacqueline Carole Ntsama	21–5, 21–5	(gold) Winner
2018	Uganda Para Badminton International	(Scotland) Mary Margaret Wilson	(Nigeria) Gift Ijeoma Chukwuemeka (Nigeria) Chinyere Lucky Okoro	21–12, 21–11	(gold) Winner
2018	Uganda Para Badminton International	(Scotland) Mary Margaret Wilson	(Uganda) Khadija Khamuka (Uganda) Rose Nansereko	21–19, 21–5	(gold) Winner

== See also ==
- Badminton Confederation Africa
- Badminton at the Summer Paralympics
- BWF Para-Badminton World Championships
