= Martha Kyoshaba =

Ugandan academic

Dr. Martha Kyoshaba
- Other name: Twinamasiko
- Citizenship: Uganda
- Education: Masters, PhD education management
- Occupations: University lecturer and Academic Registrar MUST
- Employer(s): Mbarara University of Science and Technology
- Known for: Her book, Widows wear lipstick
- Notable work: Research on factors affecting academic performance of undergraduate students at Uganda Christian University. Also, examined student satisfaction in Ugandan universities based on European customer satisfaction index model.
- Predecessor: Mr. Stephen Bazirake, 2014

Martha Kyoshaba Twinamasiko is a Ugandan academic and administrator who serves as the Academic Registrar of Mbarara University of Science and Technology (MUST) and known for her contributions to the higher education sector in Uganda to improve student satisfaction and academic governance.

== Background and education ==
Dr. Kyoshaba’s academic journey includes advanced studies in educational management, with a focus on factors affecting student performance and satisfaction. Her doctoral research, titled "Examining Student Satisfaction in Universities in Uganda using the European Customer Satisfaction Index (ECSI) Model," explored how university image, student expectations, service quality, and perceived value influence student satisfaction and loyalty. This work was supported by Sweden’s research initiatives in Uganda, highlighting her as an empowered female academic in a program that has aided numerous women in science since 2000.

== Career ==
Professionally, Martha Kyoshaba has been a key figure at MUST, overseeing critical academic processes such as admissions, graduation lists, and the implementation of academic policies. To provide some examples of this, she has played a key role in the release of graduation lists for 28th, 29th, and 30th graduation at MUST; facilitating students' academic progress through thousands of students from undergraduate, master's, and PhD levels. She also guided the university through challenges, including the COVID-19 pandemic, when she announced plans for online learning and phased examination schedules in 2021. In 2009, the paper, "Factors Affecting Academic Performance of Undergraduate Students at Uganda Christian University" was submitted to Makerere University as part of Dr Kyoshaba's original research prior to commencing her employment at MUST. This work reflected her long-standing interest in educational outcomes and institutional improvement.

Her career is marked by a focus to advancing educational standards and supporting students, earning her recognition as a leader in Ugandan academia. She continues to influence higher education policy and practice through her administrative role and scholarly contributions.

== Personal life ==
Dr Martha Kyoshaba Twinamasiko is the author of 'Widows Wear Lipstick' and the founder of the online widows support group Friends of Widows.
