= Rose Mwebaza =

Ugandan lawyer

Rose Mwebaza is a Ugandan lawyer who serves as the United Nations Environment Program's regional office for Africa since 2023. She is the Director of the Climate Technology Centre & Network (CTCN), the implementation arm of the UN Framework Convention on Climate Change (UNFCCC) Technology Mechanism, which is hosted and managed by the United Nations Industrial Development Organization (UNIDO) and the UN Environment Programme. Mwebaza also serves as the Advisory Board Secretary UNFCCC.

== Background and education ==
Mwebaza earned her Bachelor of Law Degree (LL.B, Hons.) from Makerere University, Kampala, Uganda. She also attained a Master’s Degree in International Comparative Law with a Certificate of Academic Excellence from the University of Florida, U.S.A. She went on to complete her PhD in Environment and Natural Resource Governance from Macquarie University, Sydney, Australia. She is a former Carl Duisberg Research fellow at the World Conservation Union (IUCN).

== Career ==
Mwebaza was a lecturer at Makerere University, where she also served as the Head of Department for Commercial Law, and Deputy Dean of the Law School, Makerere University between 1997 and 2008. Mwebaza also served as a Senior Legal Advisor on Environmental Security for the Institute for Security Studies (ISS) based in Nairobi, Kenya. She then served as the Regional Policy Adviser for Eastern and Southern Africa on Climate Change in the Environment and Energy Group, at the United Nations Development Programme Bureau for Development Policy in Johannesburg, South Africa. She served as Programme Manager for UNDP’s regional office for Africa in Addis Ababa, Ethiopia covering 47 countries. She was also designated as Advisor to the Chairperson of the African Union, where she provided policy advice on development issues related to the African Union Development Agenda and UNDP’s Development Support to Africa. Dr. Mwebaza joined the banking sector and served as Chief Natural Resources Officer at the African Development Bank in Abidjan, Ivory Coast. She is the Director of the Climate Technology Centre & Network (CTCN), the implementation arm of the UN Framework Convention on Climate Change (UNFCCC) Technology Mechanism, which is hosted and managed by the United Nations Industrial Development Organization (UNIDO) and the UN Environment Programme replacing Jukka Uosukainen of Finland who served as CTCN Director from 2014-2019. In 2021, she was named amongst the 100 most influential women in Africa.

== Selected publications ==
- The Nature and Extent of Environmental Crimes in Seychelles
- Enforcement of Environmental Crime Laws A Framework Training Manual for Law Enforcement Agencies
- Environmental Governance and Climate Change in Africa Legal Perspectives
- Sustaining Good Governance in Water and Sanitation in Uganda
- Partnerships for Enhancing Regional Enforcement of Laws Against Environmental Crimes
- Annual Regional Conference of Judges on Environmental Security in Eastern Africa: Summary of presentations
- Environmental Crimes in Ethiopia

== See also ==
- Sarah Bireete
- Betty Kamya
- Lillian Tibatemwa-Ekirikubinza
