= Kibuli Secondary School =

Location
- Kibuli, Kampala, Makindye Division; Uganda; 00°18′38″N 32°35′51″E

Information
- Type: Public Middle School and High School (S1-S6)
- Motto: "Seek Knowlwdge"
- Established: 1959
- Head Teacher: Ssemakadde Ibrahim
- Faculty: 98 (2014)
- Enrollment: 1,567 (2014)
- Athletics: Soccer, track, tennis, volleyball, basketball
- Website: Homepage

Kibuli Secondary School (KSS) is a mixed boarding secondary school in Uganda.

== Location ==
KSS is located on Kibuli Hill, in Makindye Division, in the south-central part of the city of Kampala, Uganda's capital and largest city. The coordinates of Kibuli Secondary School are:0°18'38.0"N, 32°35'51.0"E (Latitude:0.310556; Longitude:32.597500).

== Overview ==
The school is affiliated with the Muslim faith, but admission is based on academic performance and is open to any interested student, regardless of religious beliefs. The school has a reputation of being a leading academic center with a history of sporting achievements.

The school is a sports giant in Uganda as well as in East Africa. In Uganda, it holds the highest number of cup wins (11) in high school football, a record it shares with St. Marys Kitende.

== History ==
Prince Badru Kakungulu (died 1991), a paternal uncle to Muwenda Mutebi II, the reigning Buganda monarch (since 1993), who lived during the early 20th Century, donated 80 acres (32 ha) on Kibuli Hill, where the school was constructed. The school was founded in 1959.

== Notable alumni ==
The following are some of the prominent people who have gone through the school:

- Fahad Bayo - Ugandan professional footballer who plays as a forward for MFK Vyškov in the Czech National Football League.
- Tenywa Bonseu - retired Ugandan footballer, who played nine years of professional soccer as a defender in the United States.
- Nancy Kacungira - Journalist, reporter and presenter at BBC on Focus on Africa and World Business Report
- Prince Kassim Nakibinge Kakungulu – Son to Badru Kakungulu Titular Mufti of Uganda, a role he inherited as a prominent member of the Buganda Royal Family.
- Amb. Al haji. Prof. Badru Kateregga
- Sarah Wasagali Kanaabi - Economist, Academic, Public Administrator, First woman Chairperson of the Electricity Regulatory Authority (Uganda)
- Sarah Kanyike - Cabinet Minister for the elderly and disabled, effective July 2020.
- Badru Kiggundu - Ugandan civil engineer, academic and consultant, who serves as the chancellor of Busitema university, chairman of the presidential select committee responsible for the supervision of the successful completion of both Isimba Hydroelectric Power Station and Karuma Hydroelectric Power Station He concurrently serves as the chairman of the board of directors of National Water and Sewerage Corporation., from 2002 until 2016, he served as the chairman of the Electoral Commission of Uganda, for 14 consecutive years.
- Muwanga Kivumbi – Economist, Member of the Parliament of Uganda from Butambala
- John Ssebaana Kizito - Former mayor of Kampala
- Usher Komugisha – Sports Journalist and commentator, former athlete
- Brian Mushana Kwesiga - entrepreneur, engineer, and civic leader; former president and CEO, Ugandan North American Association (UNAA)
- Moses Matovu, musician
- Saidi Mayanja - Ugandan professional footballer who plays as a midfielder for KCCA FC in the Uganda Premier League.
- Abdallah Mubiru - Ugandan manager (association football) and former player who currently manages KCCA FC. He has coached various teams across the local football league and the senior national team.
- Arnold Ainebyona Mugisha - Ugandan businessman and inventor
- Moses Muhangi - Ugandan entrepreneur and the current president of the Uganda Boxing Federation.
- Ssekaana Musa - Justice of the High court of Uganda.
- James Musinguzi - Ugandan environmentalist and the executive director of the Uganda Wildlife Authority (UWA).
- Rehema Nanfuka - television actress, director, and filmmaker known for her roles in Imani, Veronica's Wish, Imbabazi, The Girl in the Yellow Jumper, Queen of Katwe, and Imperial Blue,
- Muhammad Nsereko - Member of the Parliament of Uganda for Kampala Central
- Allan Okello - Uganda
- Allan Oyirwoth - Ugandan professional footballer who plays for Major League Soccer club New England Revolution and the Uganda national football team.
- Jane Avur Pacuto - Politician, Administrator, Woman Member of Parliament for Pakwach District
- Julius Poloto - Ugandan footballer who plays as a midfielder for Kampala Capital City Authority FC, commonly known as KCCA FC, in the Uganda Premier League. Captain for both Uganda's U‑17 and U‑20 national teams.
- Ibrahim Sekagya - Assistant coach for the New York Red Bulls in Major League Soccer, former Ugandan footballer who played as a centre back.
- Hakim Sendagire - Physician, microbiologist, biochemist and academic administrator. Current dean, Habib Medical School
- Jaberi Bidandi Ssali - Ugandan politician, businessman, and former football manager., Minister for Local Government from 1989 to 2004, candidate in the 2011 Ugandan general election.
- Henry Tumukunde - Former director, Internal Security Organization (ISO)
- Mary Paula Kebirungi Turyahikayo - Ugandan politician and social scientist., former woman Member of Parliament representative for Rubabo County, Rukungiri District
- Princess (Omumbejja) Alice Mpologoma Zaalwango, daughter of Kabaka Mutesa II and Edith Kasozi
- Hakim Zziwa, Film director, producer and cinematographer
