= Alice Mwesigwa =

Ugandan educator, lecturer

Dr. Alice Mwesigwa
- Born: 1969 (age 56–57)
- Other name: Maama Alice
- Citizenship: Ugandan
- Education: PhD, Masters in Education management, Bachelors in education, Diploma in education
- Occupation: Lecturer
- Employer(s): Mbarara University, Bishop Stuart University

Alice Mwesigwa (born 1969) is a Ugandan teacher and lecturer at Bishop Stuart University and Mbarara University of Science and Technology. As a teacher, she taught in many secondary schools including Ntare School Mbarara. Dr. Alice is a mother and a wife to Bishop Sheldon Mwesigwa of Ankole diocese.

== Education background ==
Alice Mwesigwa holds a PhD in Education Administration and Planning from Dar es salaam University, a Masters of Education Management and planning from University of Leeds, Bachelors in Education from Makerere University and a Diploma in Education from ITEK-Kyambogo.

== Career ==
Alice Mwesigwa started her career as a teacher in 1992 when she was posted to Kibubura Girls' School, where she was appointed the patron of the Scripture Union. In 1995, Alice joined Ntare School, where she was put in charge of chapel affairs.

In 2002, After Alice had finished her Masters in Education Management and Planning, she started her career as a lecturer at Uganda Christian University. Alice lecturers at Bishop Stuart University and Mbarara University of Science and Technology where she mentors students spiritually and offers counselling services which has earned her a name Maama Alice among her students.

Alice is also the president Mothers' Union Ankole diocese, vice president Mothers' Union Church of Uganda Province, Chairperson publications and communication committee at Church of Uganda Province, Member of the Church of Uganda Provincial Assembly, and also the Provincial Assembly standing committee member.

== See also ==
- Pauline Byakika
- Martha Kyoshaba
