= Xavier Kyooma =

Ugandan politician

Honourable Xavier Kyooma Akampurira
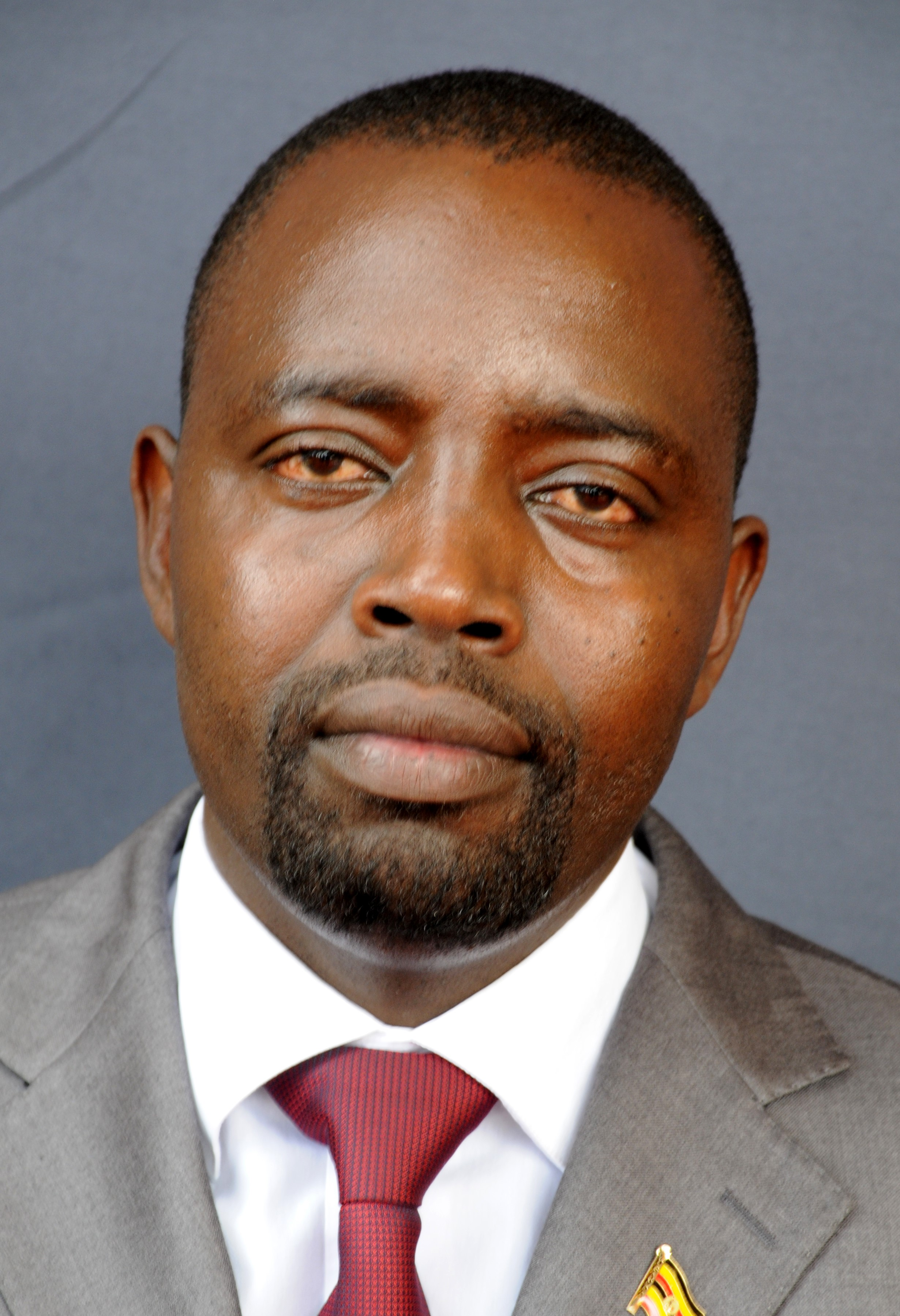
- Kyooma in 2011

Member of the Parliament of Uganda
- Incumbent
- Assumed office 24 May 2021
- Preceded by: Guma Gumisiriza David
- Constituency: Ibanda County North

Member of the Parliament of Uganda
- In office May 19, 2011 – May 11, 2016
- Preceded by: Guma Gumisiriza David
- Succeeded by: Guma Gumisiriza David
- Constituency: Ibanda County North

Personal details
- Born: Uganda
- Party: National Resistance Movement

Xavier Kyooma Akampurira is a Ugandan politician who serves as an MP of Uganda. He represents the constituency of Ibanda North as their elected Member of Parliament under the National Resistance Movement Political party in Uganda.

== Political positions ==
Kyooma proposed mandatory HIV testing in prisons and to separate HIV positive inmates from negative inmates to combat the HIV epidemic. He was appointed chairman of a committee to investigate Monica Musenero over alleged misuse of funds allocated for COVID-19 vaccine research.

== Electoral history ==
Kyooma was elected to the 9th parliament in 2011, but was not elected to the 10th parliament. He was elected to the 11th parliament in 2021.

== See Also ==
- Anita Among
- Abdu Katuntu
- Monica Musenero
- Mathias Mpuga
