= Makerere University Business School =

School of business of Makerere University, Uganda

- Motto: Enabling the Future
- Type: Public university
- Established: 1997
- Affiliations: Makerere University
- Principal: Professor Moses Muhwezi
- Students: 15,000+ (2021)
- Location: 21A Port Bell Road; Nakawa Division; Kampala, Uganda; 00°19′42″N 32°36′59″E
- Campus: Urban
- Colours: Blue, Yellow, Red, White
- Website: Homepage
- Location in Kampala

Makerere University Business School (MUBS) is the school of business of Makerere University, Uganda's oldest university. MUBS provides business and management education at the certificate, diploma, undergraduate and postgraduate levels.

== Location ==
The school's campus is located at Plot 21A Port Bell Road, in Nakawa Division, one of the five administrative divisions of Kampala, the capital and largest city of Uganda, approximately 5.5 kilometres (3 mi), by road, east of the city centre. The coordinates of the school campus are: 0°19'42.0"N 32°36'59.0"E (Latitude:0.328333; Longitude:32.616389).

== History ==
MUBS was established in the 1960s as National College of Business Studies (NCBS). It offered business and management diplomas as well as professional training in business. At that time, the college offered diplomas, the main ones being the Uganda Diploma in Business Studies and the Higher Diploma in Marketing.

In 1997, Faculty of Commerce at Makerere University was merged with NCBS, thereby creating MUBS, a constituent college of Makerere University. The staff and students of both institutions were brought together at the 45 acres (18 ha) campus at Nakawa, approximately 5.5 kilometres (3.4 mi), east of Kampala's central business district.

In 2001, due to changes in the laws of Uganda, MUBS transformed from a constituent college of Makerere University to a "public tertiary institution" affiliated to Makerere University. However this arrangement did not work well, resulting in Makerere introducing competing duplicate courses at the main campus, while MUBS started to agitate for complete autonomy. Finally in 2012, the autonomy sought by MUBS was granted by the Uganda Ministry of Education and Sports.

== Autonomy ==
In January 2012, Ugandan media reported that MUBS will break away from Makerere University and reconstitute itself into an independent university. This will result in the change of its name to a new name, yet to be determined.

In August 2013, Uganda's Attorney General began drafting the necessary legislation to separate MUBS from Makerere University. The draft was expected to be presented to the Ugandan Parliament for debate and enactment into law.

== Faculties ==
As of November 2022, the school has the following faculties:

- Faculty of Commerce
- Faculty of Computing and Informatics
- Faculty of Entrepreneurship and Small Business Management
- Faculty of Business Administration
- Faculty of Management
- Faculty of Marketing and International Business
- Faculty of Economics, Energy and Management Sciences
- Faculty of Procurement and Logistics Management
- Faculty of Tourism, Hospitality & Languages
- Faculty of Science Education
- Faculty of Vocational and Distance Education
- Faculty of Graduate Studies and Research

== Outreach Centres ==
The School operates the following outreach centres in addition to the Academic Faculties:

- Entrepreneurship, Innovation and Incubation Centre
- The ICT Centre
- The Leadership Centre
- Microfinance Centre
- The MUBS Career and Skills Development Centre
- The MUBS Centre for Executive Education
- The MUBS Disability Resource and Learning Centre

== Notable Scholars ==
Makerere University Business School has been ranked by AD Science among the top 3 leading Ugandan universities (after Makerere University the mother institution and Makerere University College of Health Sciences) in Scientific research and publication. Leading scientists as of 2022 AD Science rankings include Prof. Joseph M. Ntayi, Prof. Stephen Nkundabanyanga, Juma Bananuka (RIP), Prof. Laura Orobia, Prof. Twaaha Kigongo Kaawaase, Prof. Muhammed Ngoma, Prof. Geoffrey Kituyi Mayoka, Prof. Musa Bukoma Moya, Bob Ssekiziyivu, Zainab Tumwebaze, Dr. Edward Kabaale, among others. Other notable scholars include Prof. Waswa Balunywa, Prof. John C. Munene, Prof. Moses Muhwezi, Prof. Robert Kyeyune, Prof. Suudi Nangoli, among others.

== Notable alumni ==
MUBS has a number of notable Alumni in the fields of Academia, Business, Entrepreneurship, Politics, Entertainment and Society. Some of these have either taught or studied at the Institution.

Notable Alumni and Former Staff of Makerere University Business School include;

Politicians and Civil Servants

- Anita Annet Among: Speaker of the 11th Parliament of Uganda
- Ramathan Ggoobi: Permanent Secretary/ Secretary to the Treasury, Ministry of Finance, Uganda
- Xavier Kyooma: Member of Parliament (MP) for Ibanda North Constituency 2021 - 2026.

Visiting Professors

- Prof. Peter Rosa – University of Edinburgh
- Prof. Tom Root – Drake University
- Prof. Augustine Ahiauzu – International Centre for Management Research and Training (CIMRAT) Nigeria.
- Prof. Damien Ejigiri – Southern University
- Prof. Gerrit Rooks – Technical University Eindhoven
- Prof. Jimmy D. Senteza – Drake University
- Prof Victor W.A Mbarika – Southern University
- Hassan Omar Mahadallah Ph.D – Southern University
- Prof. Timothy Shaw – The University of the West indies
- Prof. Pascal T. Ngoboka – University of Wisconsin
- Prof.Michael Frese – Leuphana University
- Prof. G.V. Joshi
- Prof. Debra . S. Bishop
- Dr. Mary Clark Bruce
- Dr. M.S. Moodithaya
- Dr. Chanika R. Jones

Academia

- Prof. Arthur Sserwanga – Former Vice chancellor of Muteesa I Royal University
- Dr. Stephen Robert Isabalija – Former Vice chancellor of Victoria University
- Prof. Nixon Kamukama- DVC- Mbarara University of Science & Technology

Sports

- Dorcus Inzikuru – Track and field athlete – winner of the inaugural world title in women’s 3000 m steeplechase
- Davis Kamoga – Athlete – won the first Ugandan medal at the World Championships Athens 1997

Entertainment

- Mariam Ndagire – Artist in the Uganda Entertainment Industry
- Quiin Abenakyo – Miss Uganda 2018 -> Crowned Miss Africa 2018
- Hakim Zziwa - Film Director, Producer and Cinematographer

== See also ==
- List of universities in Uganda
- Education in Uganda
- Makerere University
- Universities Offering Business Courses in Uganda
