= Habib Medical School =

Medical school in Uganda

Coordinates: 00°20′12″N 32°20′55″E

- Type: Private
- Established: 2014
- Affiliations: Islamic University in Uganda
- Dean: Hakim Sendagire
- Students: 55 (2015)
- Location: Kibuli, Kampala, Uganda
- Campus: Urban

Habib Medical School (HMS) is the school of medicine of the Islamic University in Uganda (IUIU), one of Uganda's private universities. The school is the newest medical school in the country, having been part of IUIU since 2014. The school provides medical education at diploma and undergraduate levels.

== Location ==
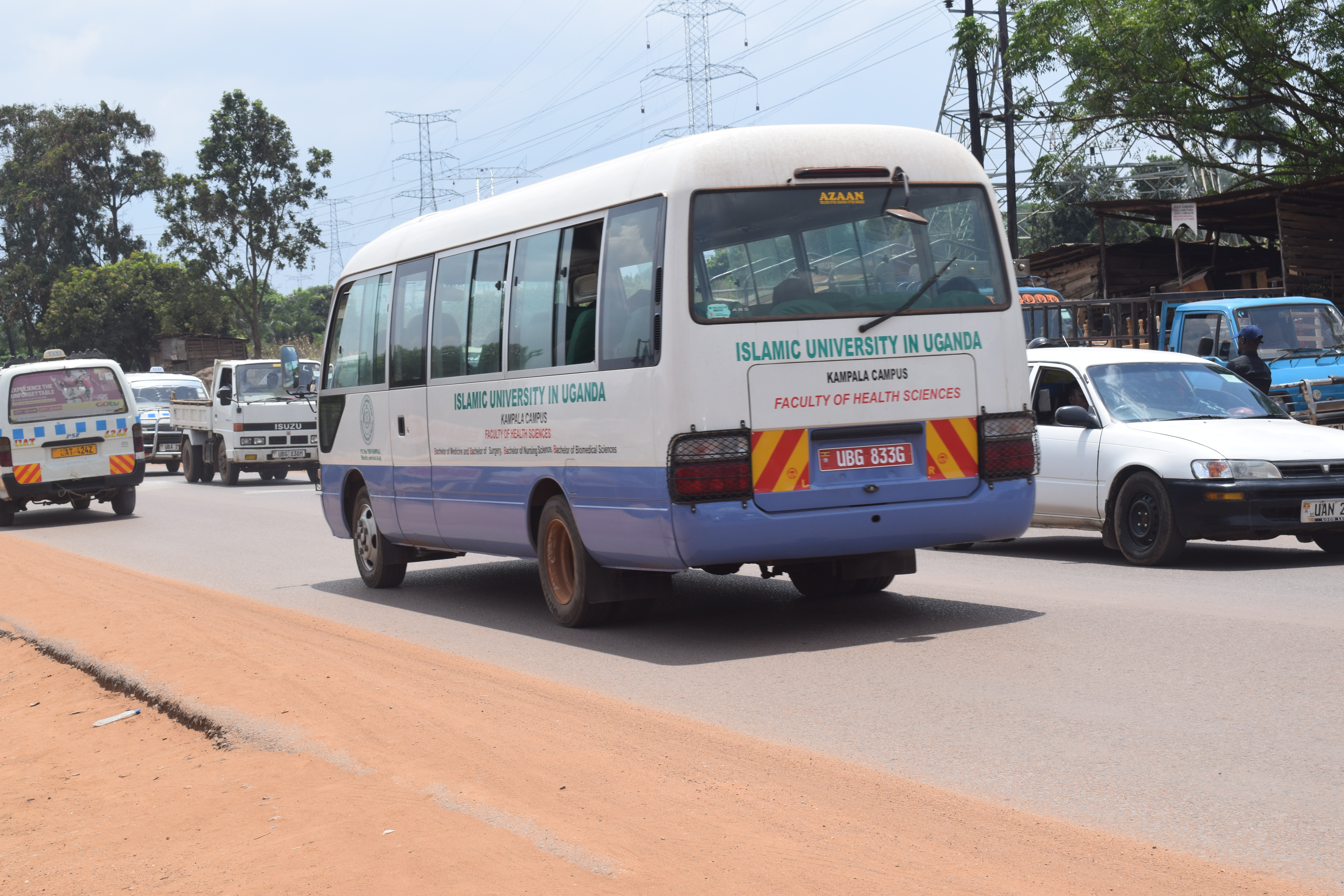
Faculty of Health Sciences bus

The medical school is located at the Kampala campus of Islamic University in Uganda, on Kiuli Hillvand adjacent to Kibuli Hospital. This location is approximately 3.5 kilometres (2.2 mi), by road, south-east of the central business district of Kampala, Uganda's capital and largest city.

The coordinates of Habib Medical School are:0°18'37.0"N, 32°35'40.0"E (Latitude:0.310278; Longitude:32.594444).

== Overview ==
Habib Medical School constitutes the Faculty of Health Sciences at the Islamic University in Uganda. The faculty is headed by a Dean, who is deputized by a Deputy Dean. Many of the academic positions within the faculty are yet to be filled. The teaching disciplines of the medical school are integrated with those of Kibuli Hospital, the teaching hospital of the university. The hospital's consultants, registrars and interns collaborate in teaching the university's medical students.

== History ==
The medical school is named after the Habib family from Saudi Arabia, who contributed heavily to the construction of the physical infrastructure and the equipping of the facilities. Other contributors included the University of Lahore in Pakistan. Habib Medical School began classes on 27 October 2014 with 35 students, out of the 120 who were admitted for the five-year MBChB degree course. The medical school is part of IUIU's expansion program, which includes the creation of the Faculty of Engineering in 2015.

== Undergraduate courses ==
The following undergraduate courses are offered:.

A Bachelor of Medicine and Bachelor of Surgery degree is awarded after two years of pre-clinical instruction and examination in anatomy, physiology, biochemistry, microbiology, pathology, and pharmacology, followed by three years of clinical instruction and examination in general surgery, internal medicine, pediatrics, obstetrics, gynecology, psychiatry, otolaryngology, neurosurgery, orthopedics, anesthesiology, urology, and public health.

== See also ==
- Education in Uganda
- List of universities in Uganda
- List of medical schools in Uganda
- List of hospitals in Uganda
- Hakim Ssendagire
- Islamic University In Uganda
