= Julius Poloto =

Ugandan footballer

Personal information
- Full name: Julius Poloto
- Place of birth: Uganda
- Date of death: September 9, 1999
- Position: Midfielder

Team information
- Current team: Kampala Capital City Authority FC
- Number: 7

Youth career
- Years: Team
- Kasawo Secondary School
- Amus College School
- Kibuli Secondary School
- KCCA FC Academy

Julius Poloto (born on 9 September 1999) is a Ugandan association footballer who plays as a midfielder for Kampala Capital City Authority FC, commonly known as KCCA FC, in the Uganda Premier League. Poloto captained for both Uganda’s U‑17 and U‑20 national teams. He served as vice-captain and club captain at KCCA FC a head of the 2023/24 season replacing Benjamin Ochan who was the club captain for two seasons.

Julius Poloto came off the bench to score the decisive goal as KCCA edged Gaddafi 1–0 in April 2023, maintaining coach Jackson Mayanja’s unbeaten league start.

== Early life and club career ==
Julius Poloto began his Secondary education at Kasawo Secondary School, then joined Amus College School, where he played in the 2015 national championships. He later attended Kibuli Secondary School, from where he joined the KCCA Football Academy. He earned a promotion to the senior team in 2017 under manager Mike Mutebi alongside players like Allan Okello and Peter Magambo. Poloto is also linked to Bukedi College during youth tournaments.

== International career ==
Poloto captained Uganda’s U-20 team in the 2018 CAF U-20 qualifiers, scoring against South Sudan and playing against Cameroon. In 2014, he featured for Uganda’s U-17 team, scoring in a 4–0 win over Rwanda. In 2018, He was also named in the Uganda Cranes’ provisional squad for AFCON qualifiers but hasn’t earned a senior cap.
