= Kampala University =

Private university in Uganda

Kampala University (KU)
- Motto: We Strive for Excellence
- Type: Private
- Established: 1999; 27 years ago
- Chancellor: Prof Mondo Kagonyera
- Vice-Chancellor: Professor Badru Dungu Kateregga
- Administrative staff: 350
- Students: 10,000+ (2019)
- Location: Kampala, Uganda; 00°15′38″N 32°38′02″E
- Campus: Urban
- Website: www.ku.ac.ug
- Location within Kampala

Kampala University (KU) is a private, chartered, recognized and accredited university in Uganda.

== Location ==
As of August 2021, KU maintained the following campuses:

1. Ggaba: The main campus is in a neighborhood in Makindye Division, approximately 12 kilometres (7 mi) southeast of the central business district (CBD) of Kampala, the capital and largest city of Uganda. The coordinates of the main campus are 0°15'38.0"N, 32°38'08.0"E (Latitude:0.260556; Longitude:32.635556).

2. Old Kampala: Located in another Kampala neighborhood, approximately 2.5 kilometres (2 mi), west of the city's CBD.

3. Masaka: Approximately 137 kilometres (85 mi) southwest of Kampala.

4. Luweero: Approximately 65 kilometres (40 mi), by road, north of Kampala on the Kampala–Gulu Highway.

5. Mutundwe: In a neighborhood in the newly created town of Ssabagabo, Wakiso District, about 8 kilometres (5 mi), by road, southwest of Kampala's central business district.

6. Jinja, about 81 kilometres (50 mi), by road, east of Kampala along the Kampala–Jinja Highway.

== History ==
KU was founded in 1999. The founding vice chancellor, Badru Kateregga, together with other academics and entrepreneurs pooled resources to establish the university. It received its license from the Uganda National Council for Higher Education in 2000.

During the university's graduation ceremony in March 2012, 2,048 graduates were awarded degrees, diplomas, and certificates in various disciplines. Of these, 57.9 percent were male and 42.1 percent were female. Seventy-four graduates received master's degrees and 24 received postgraduate diplomas.

== Affiliation ==
KU is affiliated with the East African University (TEAU) in Kitengela, Kenya. Badru Kateregga, the vice chancellor of KU, also serves as chairman of the board of trustees of TEAU.

== Academic schools ==
KU has seven constituent schools:

1. Faculty of Industrial Art and Design - Ggaba Campus
2. Faculty of Computer Science and Information Technology - Ggaba Campus
3. Faculty of Business and Management - Ggaba Campus
4. Faculty of Natural Sciences - Ggaba Campus
5. Faculty of Arts and Social Sciences - Ggaba Campus
6. Faculty of Nursing and Health Sciences - Mutundwe Campus
7. Faculty of Filmmaking - Kampala Film School Ggaba

== Courses ==
=== Graduate school courses ===
- Masters of Public Health
- Master of Economic Policy and Management
- Masters of Development Studies
- Masters of Environmental Management
- Masters of English Language and Literature Education
- Masters of Educational Management
- Masters of Guidance and Counseling
- Masters of Business Administration
- Masters of procurement and Logistics Management
- Masters of Social Work and Community Development
- Master of diplomacy and International Relations
- Master of Information Technology
- Masters of Medicine and Surgery
- Masters of Economic Policy and Planning

=== Undergraduate degree courses ===
- Bachelor of Industrial Art and Design
- Bachelor of Industrial Art and Design with Education
- Bachelor of Arts in Fashion Design
- Bachelor of Arts in Interior Design
- Bachelor of Computer Science
- Bachelor of Information Technology
- Bachelor of Computer Science and Information Technology
- Bachelor of Business Administration
- Bachelor of Procurement and Logistics Management
- Bachelor of Business Computing
- Bachelor of Credit Management
- Bachelor of Secretarial and Office Management
- Bachelor of Leisure Tourism and Hotel Management
- Bachelor of Environmental Management
- Bachelor of Arts with Education
- Bachelor of Public Administration
- Bachelor of Political Science
- Bachelor of Social Work and Social Administration
- Bachelor of Human Resource Management
- Bachelor of Mass Communication.

=== Diploma courses ===
- Diploma in Industrial Art and Design
- Diploma in Industrial Art and Design with Education
- Diploma in Art and Fashion Design
- Diploma of Art in Interior Design
- Diploma in Computer Science
- Diploma in Computer Science and Information Technology
- Diploma in Business Administration
- Diploma in procurement and Logistics Management
- Diploma in Business Computing
- Diploma in Credit Management
- Diploma in Secretarial and Office Management
- Diploma in Leisure Tourism and Hotel Management
- Diploma in Environmental Management
- Diploma in Public Administration
- Diploma in Political Science
- Diploma in Social Work and Social Administration
- Diploma in Human Resource Management
- Diploma in Guidance and Counseling

=== Certificate courses ===
- Certificate in Industrial Art and Design
- Certificate in Industrial Art and Design with Education
- Certificate in Art and Fashion Design
- Certificate in Art and Interior Design
- Certificate in Computer Science
- and Information Technology
- Certificate in Business Administration
- Certificate in Leisure Tourism and Hotel Management
- Certificate in Environmental Management
- Certificate in Public Administration
- Certificate in Social Work and Social Administration
- Certificate in Human Resource Management
- Certificate in Guidance and Counseling
- Certificate in English Language Communication

== See also ==
- Kampala Capital City Authority
- Education in Uganda
- List of universities in Uganda
- List of business schools in Uganda
- List of university leaders in Uganda
