= Islamic University in Uganda =

Private university in Mbale, Uganda

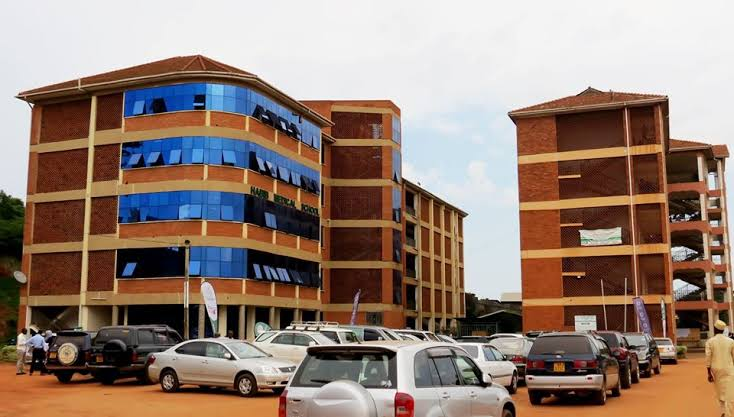
- Motto: O Lord, Advance Me In Knowledge
- Type: Private
- Established: 1988
- Chairman: Mohammad Abdulrazaq Sayyid Ebrahim A. Altababael
- Rector: Ismail Simbwa Gyagenda
- Students: 12,000+ (2022)
- Location: Mbale, Uganda; 01°06′02″N 34°10′25″E
- Campus: Urban
- Website: www.iuiu.ac.ug
- Location within Uganda

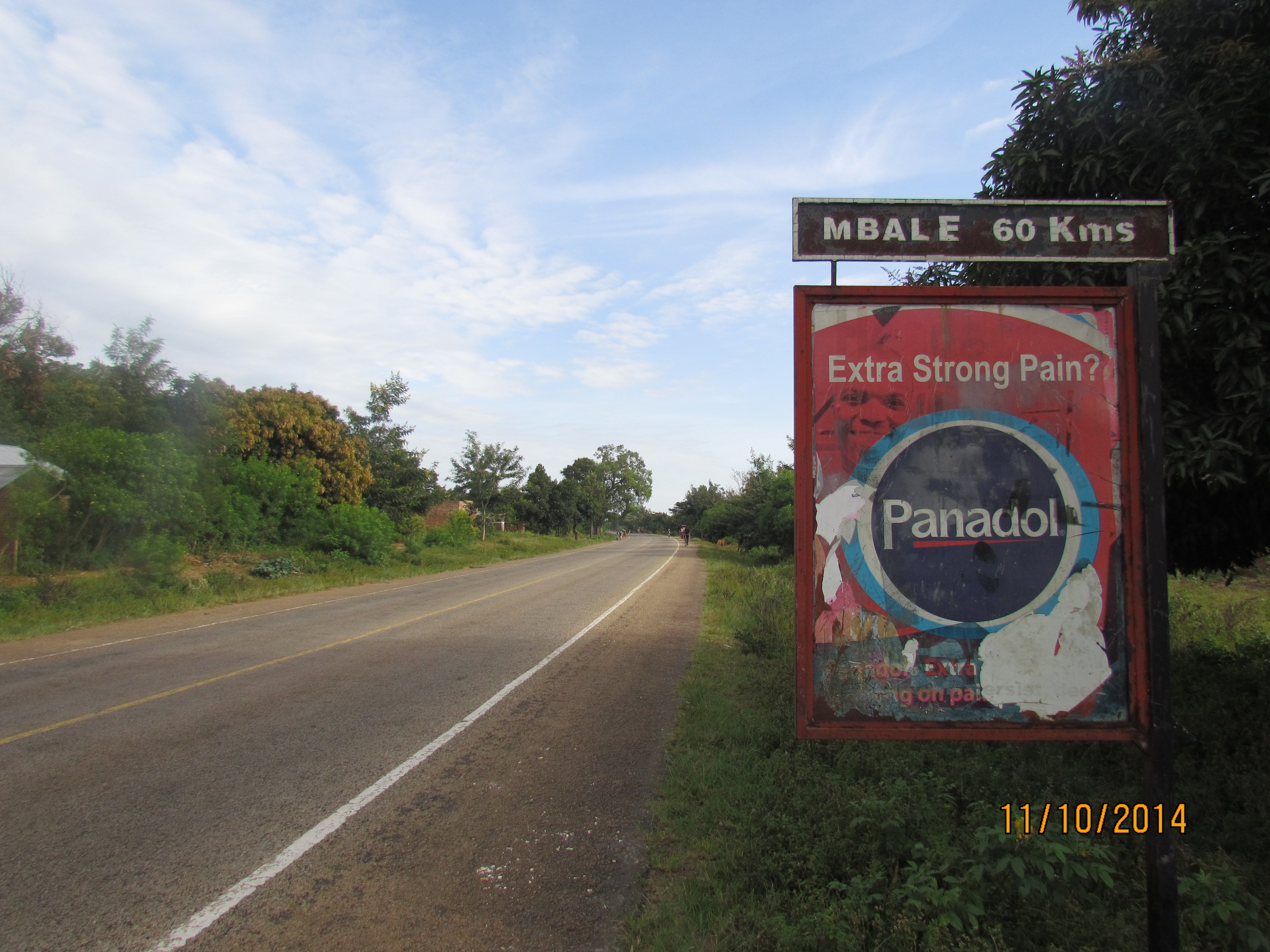
Highway road leading to Mbale district

The Islamic University in Uganda (IUIU) is a multi-campus university offering courses at certificate, diploma, undergraduate and postgraduate levels. The main campus of the university is in Mbale, about 222 kilometres (138 mi) north-east of Kampala, Uganda's capital and largest city.

== History ==
The idea to start IUIU was conceived at the second summit of the Organisation of the Islamic Conference in 1974. The university was inaugurated in February 1988 with 80 students. The main objective of the university is to serve the higher education needs of the English-speaking Muslim community in Southern and Eastern Africa. The university also enrolls non-Muslim students, who are free to practice their different religions.

== University campuses ==
As of December 2014, IUIU had four campuses:

- The Main Campus is approximately 2 kilometres (1 mi) north of Mbale's central business district in the Eastern Region of Uganda, on the Mbale-Soroti road. The coordinates of the main campus are 1°06'02.0"N, 34°10'25.0"E (Latitude:1.100556; Longitude:34.173611).
- The Kampala Campus is on Kibuli Hill, approximately 3.5 kilometres (2 mi) south-east of the central business district of Kampala, the capital and largest city of Uganda.
- The Females' Campus is in Kabojja, 8 kilometres (5 mi) west of Kampala's central business district. This campus is for female students only.
- The Arua Campus is in the town of Arua, approximately 400 kilometres (250 mi) north-west of Kampala.

== Academics ==
The university has the following faculties, as of January 2021:

- Faculty of Law
- Faculty of Science
- Faculty of Education
- Faculty of Management Studies
- Faculty of Arts & Social Sciences
- Faculty of Islamic Studies & Arabic Language
- Faculty of Health Sciences
- Faculty of Technology & Engineering (Expected)
- Faculty of Agribusiness and Natural Resource Sciences
- Center for Postgraduate Studies.

== Students ==
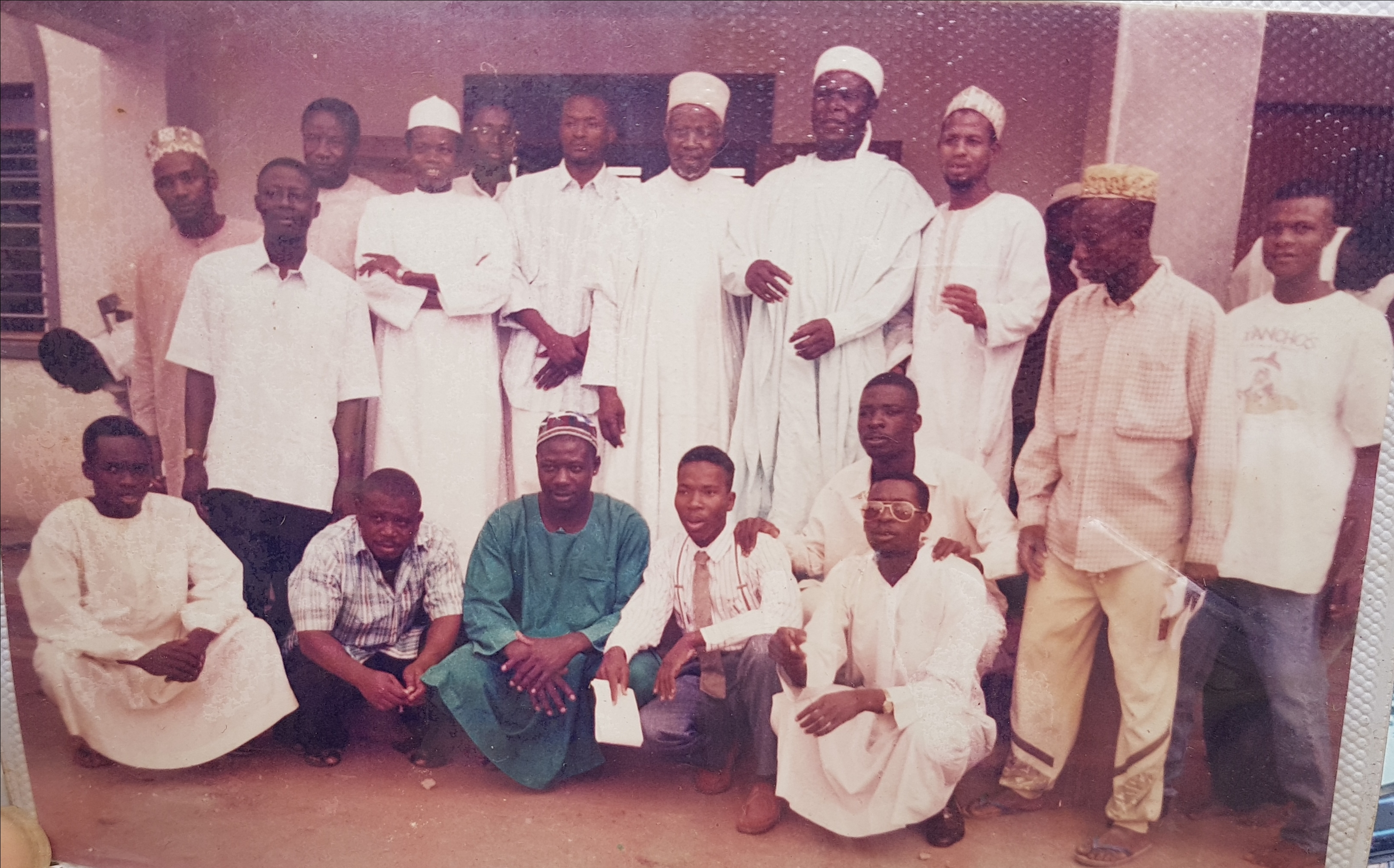
The Rector, Mahdi Adamu with some West African students

Islamic University in Uganda, affectionately called IUIU boasts of students from across the African continent. The first West African student to be admitted to the university was Mr. Abdul Ishaq Hussein from Ghana between 1989 and 1990. He was later followed by Ahmed Gedel, also from Ghana and four other Nigerians including Imam Rufai, Ismail, Uba Inuwa and Taufik Abubakar.

There were many other West African students from Mali, the Gambia, notable amongst them was the late Alieu K. Jammeh, who served as Minister of Sports under Yahya Jammeh and Gambia's High Commissioner to Guinea before his untimely death in 2023.

There were students from Malawi, Kenya, Tanzania, Somalia, South Africa, Djibouti and Eritrea as of July 1998.

== University halls ==
Umar-Khadija, the oldest, is also arguably the most successful hall of residence in sports activities. Two West African students were privileged to serve in high positions of the hall. They are Abdul Razak Abdul Hamid Musah, chairman and Anas Abubakar as the general secretary in 1998. Their rise to these positions was mainly because they were among three of the best table tennis players the university had ever produced. The third player was Asiso Suraqa. He was probably the best table tennis player on campus. However, the first West African Chairman of a hall of residence of the university was Nurudeen Abdul Hamid of Ali- Hafswa Hall. The other halls are Uth-Fat Hall and Abu-Aisha Hall.

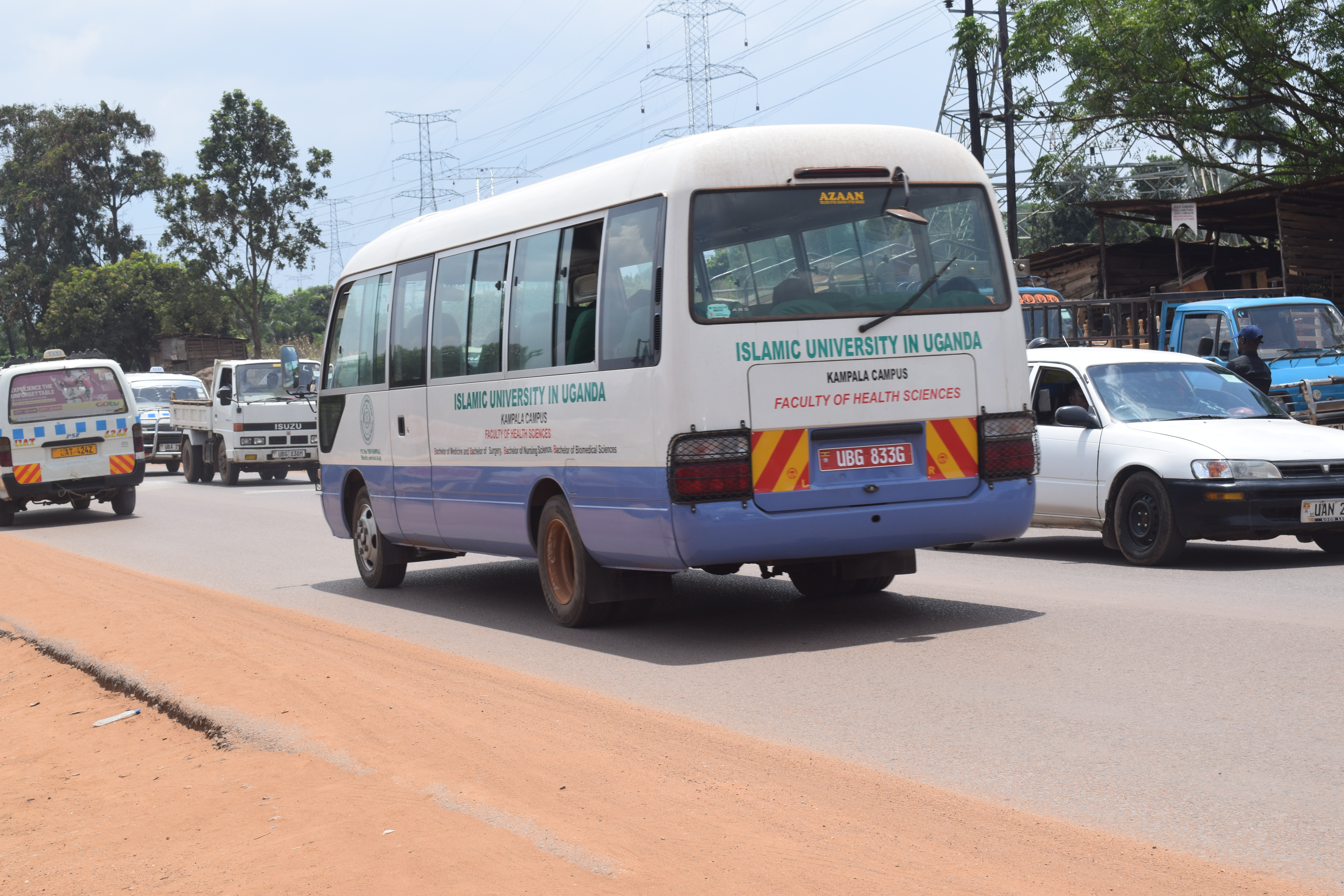
Islamic University in Uganda bus

== Notable alumni ==
- Acaye Kerunen (B.S. 2009), artist
- Faridah Nakazibwe, journalist

== See also ==
- List of Islamic educational institutions
- List of universities in Uganda
- List of law schools in Uganda
- List of medical schools in Uganda
- List of business schools in Uganda
- List of university leaders in Uganda
- Education in Uganda
