= Lord Mayor of Kampala =

Honorary title for the chair of the Kampala Capital City Authority

- Incumbent; Ronald Nsubuga since 20 May 2026
- Style: Mr. Mayor (informal); The Worshipful (formal); The Honorable (formal)
- Reports to: Minister for Kampala
- Residence: Kampala
- Appointer: Kampala Capital City Authority
- Inaugural holder: Sir Amar Maini
- Formation: 1950
- Deputy: Deputy Lord Mayor of Kampala
- Website: kcca.go.ug

The Lord Mayor of Kampala City (Swahili: Bwana Meya wa Kampala) is the honorary title of the chairperson of Kampala Capital City Authority which is the local government body for the city of Kampala, the capital of the Republic of Uganda. The incumbent, since 2026, is Engineer Ronald Nsubuga, who defeated councilor Erias Lukwago during the 2026 general elections in Uganda. Lukwago occupied that position continuously between 2011 until 2026.

== History ==
The office of Mayor of Kampala was created in 1950 by the government of the Protectorate of Uganda, and headed the Kampala City Council. In 1998, the mayor was elected directly for the first time. The office of Mayor was elevated to Lord Mayor in 2011 by the newly established Kampala Capital City Authority. Its role was reduced to a ceremonial one, with powers being transferred to the executive director, appointed by the President of Uganda, and the Minister for Kampala in the Cabinet.

== Functions ==
The office is largely symbolic and its responsibilities consist of chairing meetings of the city council and representing the city at public events. The Deputy Lord Mayor assists the Lord Mayor in the performance of his or her functions and otherwise deputise for the Lord Mayor in his or her absence.

== List of mayors ==
- Sir Amar Maini (1950–1955)
- K. H. Dale (1955–1956) (Note: Died in Office)
- C. Lewis (1956–1958)
- C. E. Develin (1958–1959)
- S. W. Kulubya (1959–1961) (Note: The first African Mayor of Kampala.)
- Barbara Saben (1961–1962) (Note: The first female Mayor of Kampala.)
- P. I. Patel (1962–1963)
- P. N. Kavuma (1961–1965)
- W. Y. Nega (1965–1968)
- A. G. Mehta (1968 – 10 March 1969) (Note: Died in Office)
- E. W. Nakibinge (1969-–1971)
- George Franck Walusimbi Mpanga (1971–1982)
- Fred Ssemaganda (1982–1986)
- Joseph Wasswa Ziritwawula (1987–1989)
- Christopher Iga (1989–1997)
- Nasser Sebaggala (1998–1999)
- John Ssebaana Kizito (1999–2006)
- Nasser Sebaggala (2006–2011)
- Erias Lukwago (2011–2026)
- Ronald Nsubuga Balimwezo (2026–)

== See also ==
- Lord Mayor
- List of cities and towns in Uganda
- Kampala Capital City Authority
