= Acan Joyce Okeny =

Hon. Acan Joyce Okeny
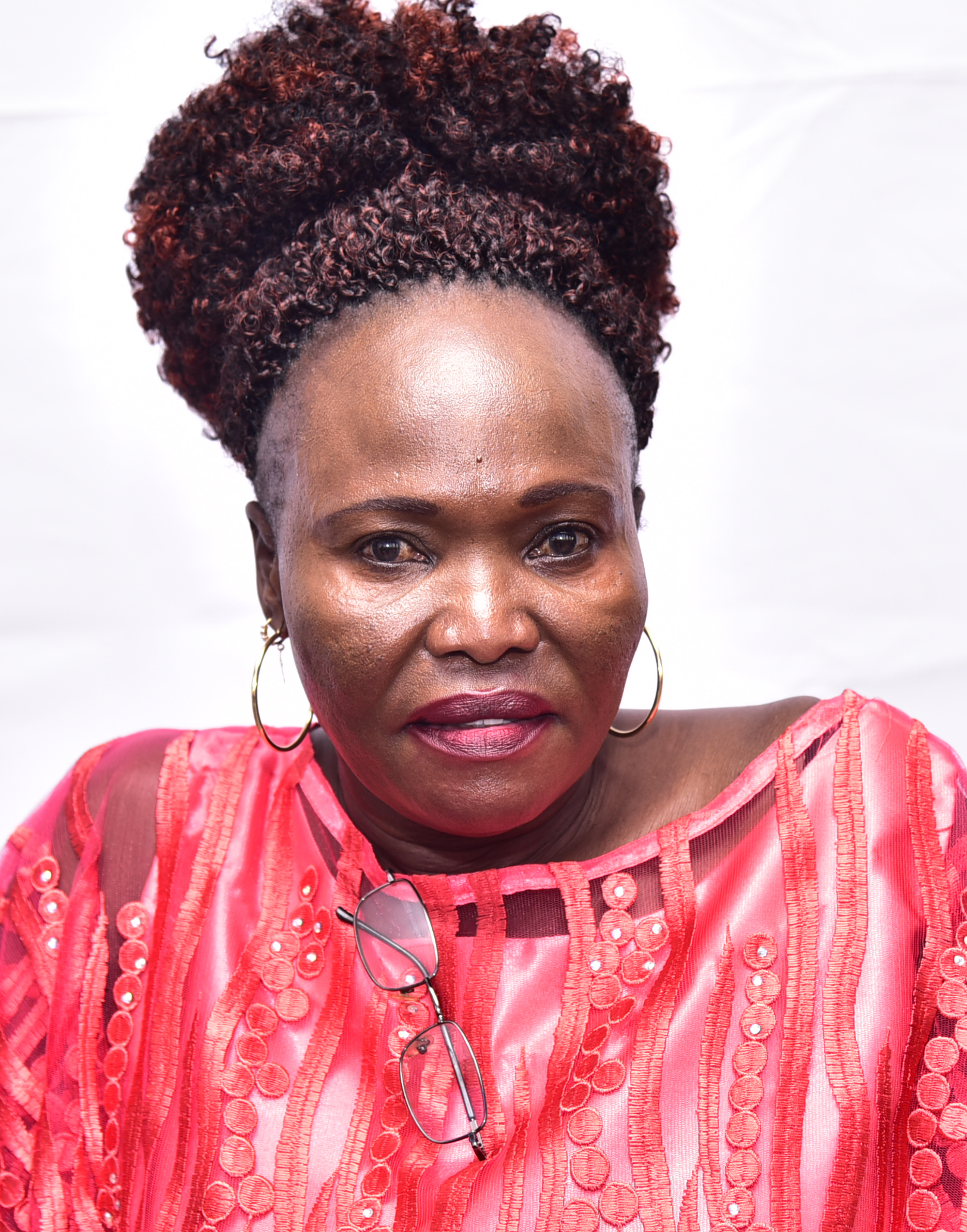

Minister of State for Gender, Labour and Social Development (Disability Affairs)
- Constituency: Representative of Persons with Disabilities (Female)

Member of Parliament, 12th Parliament of Uganda

Personal details
- Born: Uganda
- Party: National Resistance Movement (NRM)
- Education: Makerere University
- Occupation: Politician, Management Scientist
- Profession: Politician, Management Scientist
- Known for: Advocacy for persons with disabilities

Acan Joyce Okeny is a Ugandan politician and management scientist who is a female representative of people with disabilities in the 12th Parliament of Uganda. She is the minister of state for gender, labour and social development for disability affairs in the 12th Parliament of Uganda, following appointment by Yoweri Kaguta Museveni and also being considered the most impactful minister for persons with disability by Kampala persons with disabilities.

== Personal life and educational history ==
She holds both a master’s degree in human resource management and a Bachelor’s in adult and Community Education from Makerere University.

== Career ==
She has been appointed by President Museveni as the Minister of State for Gender, Labour and Social Development (Disability Affairs) in the 12th Parliament of Uganda. She promised to partner with the Uganda Bureau of Statistics (UBOS) and the National Information Technology Authority-Uganda (NITA-U) to build the system and support PWD-led research to eliminate systemic barriers. As a minister, she promised to commit to enforcing accessibility standards across public infrastructure, transport, and ICT platforms aimed at strengthening Business, Technical, Vocational Education and Training (BTVET) programs to boost employment.

Joyce also served as the Kampala Capital City Authority (KCCA) councillor for equal opportunities and was nominated by the National Resistance Movement for Northern Uganda as a Member of Parliament PWDs. She has knowledge and skills in organisation development and management, human resources and project management, leadership and governance and advocacy. She is part of the Uganda Parliamentary Forum for Persons with Disabilities.

Joyce began her political journey in the late 1990s, serving as a representative for PWDs on the Nakawa Urban Council from 1998 to 2005. In 2006, she was elected to the KCCA as a representative for the PWDs, a position she held for a record 10 years until 2016. In 2015, she contested the Northern Member of Parliament seat for Persons With Disabilities before losing to the incumbent William Nyokrach by only 30 votes.

== See also ==
- Robert Ssewagudde
- List of members of the twelfth Parliament of Uganda
- Sarah Kanyike
- Minsa Kabanda
