= Ronald Balimwezo =

Ugandan Engineer and politician (born 1975)

The Worshipful Ronald Nsubuga
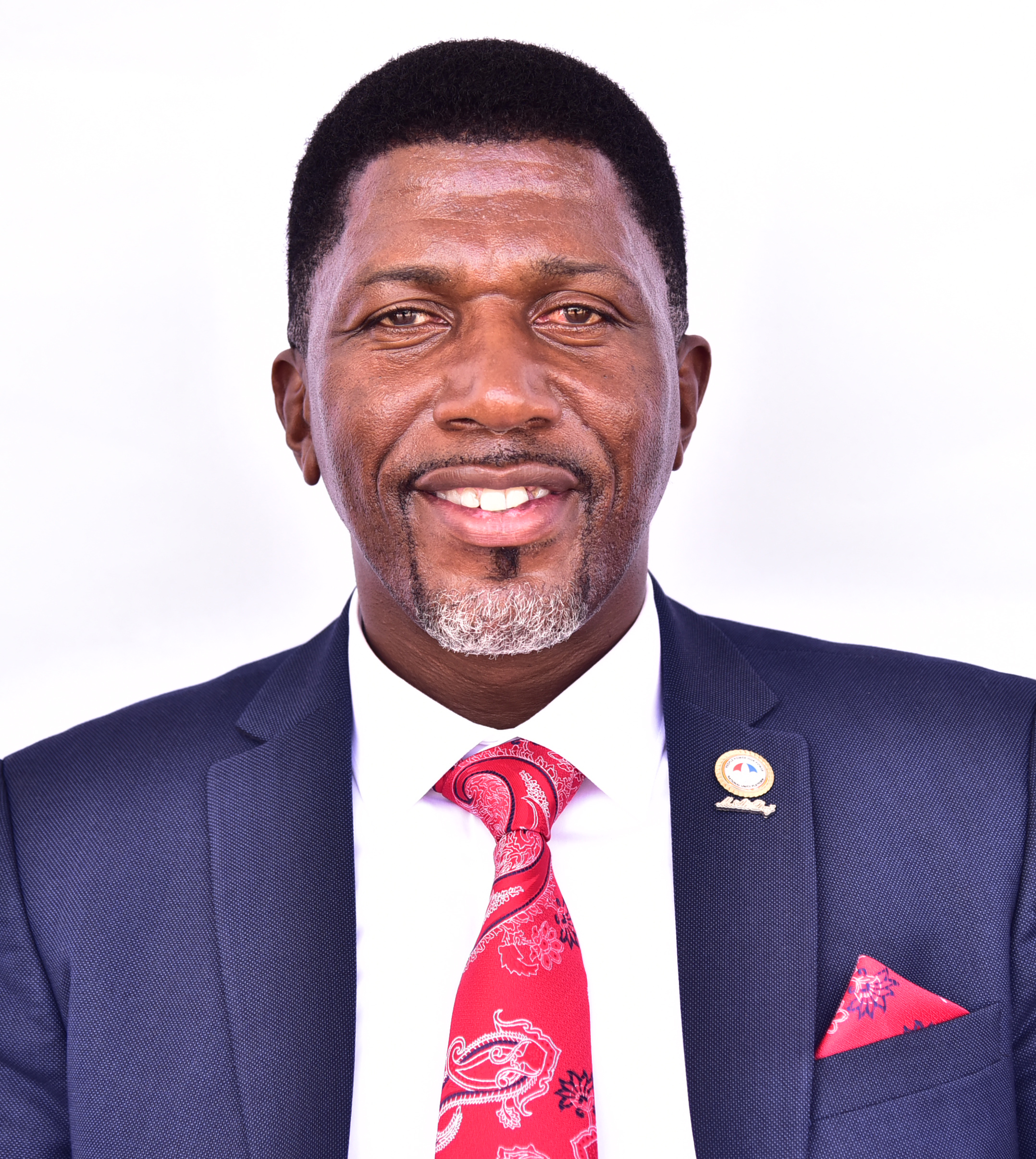
- Portrait of Ronald Balimwezo

20th Lord Mayor of Kampala Ssalongo Balimwezo Ronald Nsubuga
- Incumbent
- Assumed office 22 January 2026
- Preceded by: Erias Lukwago

Personal details
- Born: 1 January 1975 (age 51) Nakawa Division, Kampala, Uganda
- Citizenship: Uganda
- Party: National Unity Platform
- Education: Makerere University (Bachelor of Civil Engineering) (Master of Science in Civil Engineering)
- Occupation: Engineer, academic, politician
- Known for: Politics, Civil Engineering, Academics

Ronald Nsubuga Balimwezo (born 1975) is a Ugandan civil engineer and politician who serves as the incumbent mayor of Kampala, the capital of Uganda and the largest metropolitan area in the country. He was first elected to that position on 22 January 2026. Prior to that, he was a member of the 11th Parliament of Uganda representing Nakawa East Constituency from 2021 until 2026. Between 2011 until 2021, he served as the mayor of Nakawa Division, as part of KCCA Local Administration, for two consecutive terms. He served as a Councilor of Nakawa Division for one term, from 2006 until 2011. Before joining Ugandan elective politics, he was a lecturer in civil engineering at Kyambogo University. He is a member of the National Unity Platform (NUP) political party.

== Background and education ==
Ronald Nsubuga Balimwezo was born in Nakawa Division, in Kampala, Uganda in 1975 to Elizabeth Balimwezo and the late James Balimwezo. He attended Nakawa Primary School for his elementary school education. For his secondary schooling, he attended Nakawa Secondary School. In 1995, he was admitted to Makerere University, Uganda's oldest and largest public university, where he graduated with a Bachelor of Civil Engineering degree in 1999. He followed that with a Master of Science in Civil Engineering, in 2001.

== Work experience ==
For a period after graduate school, he lectured in civil engineering to undergraduates and postgraduate students at Kyambogo University, another public university in Kampala. In 2006, he was elected to the Nakawa Division local council, serving there for one five-year term until 2011. He then served two consecutive five-year terms as mayor of Nakawa Division, followed by another one five-year term serving as the member of parliament, representing Nakawa East Constituency from 2021 until 2026.

In 2026, he overwhelmingly won the election for the Lord Mayor of Kampala. He out-polled seven other politicians, who included his predecessor Erias Lukwago, who had occupied that position for 15 consecutive years since 2011.

Ronald Nsubuga Balimwezo was sworn-in as Lord Mayor of Kampala and began working in that capacity on 20 May 2026

== Personal life ==
Ronald Nsubuga Balimwezo is married to Rachael Balimwezo and together they are parents.

== See also ==
- Kampala Capital City Authority
- National Unity Platform
- Erias Lukwago

== Succession table ==
Mayor
Preceded by Erias Lukwago (14 January 2011 - 22 January 2026)	Lord Mayor of Kampala (since 20 May 2026)	Succeeded by Incumbent
