= Sarah Kanyike =

Ugandan politician

- Born: Uganda
- Citizenship: Uganda
- Education: Makerere University (Bachelor of Education)
- Occupation: Politician
- Years active: 2001 — present
- Known for: Politics
- Title: State Minister for the Elderly and the Disabled

Sarah Kanyike is a Ugandan politician, wo was appointed State Minister for the Elderly and the Disabled on 24 July 2020. Before that, she was the Deputy Lord Mayor of the city of Kampala, Uganda, the capital and largest metropolitan area in the country. She was appointed to that position on 16 June 2016. While serving as Deputy Lord Mayor, she concurrently represented Makindye East in the Kampala Capital City Authority Council.

== Background and education ==
Kanyike attended Kibuli Secondary School, before joining Makerere University, where she graduated with a Bachelor of Education degree. She is a Muslim and wears Islamic clothing.

== Work experience ==
During the 2011 to 2016 political season, Sarah Kanyike served as the personal assistant to Lord Mayor Erias Lukwago. She also represented Makindye East in the KCCA Council from 2011 to 2016. In the past, she served as councilor for Makindye East while John Ssebaana Kizito was mayor, between 1998 and 2006. She has once unsuccessfully contested for the Makindye East Parliamentary seat.

In June 2020, President Yoweri Museveni nominated Sarah Kanyike as the Director of gender at KCCA. Erias Lukwago, the Kampala Lord Mayor gave her three days to make up her mind; either take up the state appointment or stay as Deputy Lord Mayor. Kanyike chose to resign as Deputy Lord Mayor and Lukwago appointed Doreen Nyanjura as her replacement.

On 24 July 2020, the president re-directed that Kanyike be appointed to the cabinet docket of State Minister for the Elderly and Disability, which had been vacant. Reliable sources also disclosed that for one to become a director at Kampala Capital City Authority, one must possess a Master's degree. Kanyike only has a Bachelor's degree. Her appointment to cabinet was vetted by the Ugandan Parliament.

== See also ==
- Cabinet of Uganda
- Kampala Capital City Authority
