= Lugogo, Kampala =

Lugogo
- Map of Kampala showing the location of Lugogo
- Coordinates: 00°19′41″N 32°36′21″E
- Country: Uganda
- Region: Central Uganda
- District: Kampala District
- Division: Kampala Central Division
- Time zone: UTC+3 (EAT)

Lugogo is an area in the city of Kampala, Uganda's capital.

== Location ==
Lugogo is on the eastern edge of the Kampala Central Division, one of the five administrative divisions of Kampala. It is bisected into north and south by the Kampala–Jinja Highway. The Lugogo Channel, a wetland, drains the neighborhood in a north to south direction, discharging into the Nakivubo Channel and then into Lake Victoria to the south. This is about 4.5 kilometres (3 mi), by road, east of the city center. The coordinates of Lugogo are 0°19'41.0"N, 32°36'21.0"E (Latitude:0.328056; Longitude:32.605833).

Lugogo is geographically divided into three parts: Lugogo North East, Lugogo North West and Lugogo South.

=== Lugogo North East ===
Lugogo North East is bordered by Naguru Road to the north, the Lugogo Bypass to the west, and the Kampala–Jinja Highway to the south. The eastern boundary of this neighborhood is the western boundary of the Uganda Manufacturers Association showground, which is in Nakawa Division.

=== Lugogo North West ===
Lugogo North West is bounded by Hesketh Bell Road to the north, Archer Road to the west, Kampala–Jinja Highway to the south and Lugogo Bypass Road to the east.

=== Lugogo South ===
Lugogo South is bordered by the Kampala–Jinja Highway to the north and Fourth Street to the west. The eastern boundary stretches from the eastern edge of Star Auto Paradise to the eastern edge of Shell Club. The southern boundary of Lugogo South is marked by a semi-circular drainage channel that stretches from Shell Club to Spring Street.

== Overview ==
Lugogo North contains two shopping malls, an indoor sports complex, offices, an international school, and a hospital. Lugogo South containing a large power substation, an open rugby field, a car dealership and two country clubs.

== Points of interest ==
Lugogo has the following points of interest:

- Lugogo Sports Complex in North West Lugogo
- Naguru General Hospital
- Lugogo Forest Mall
- Lugogo Mall
- The French School, Kampala
- Kyadondo Rugby Club ground, one of the locations bombed by Somalia's Shabab in the July 2010 Kampala attacks
- Lugogo Electricity Substation, owned by Uganda Electricity Transmission Company Limited (UETCL).

== See also ==
- Kampala Capital City Authority
- Divisions of Kampala
