= Divisions of Kampala =

Kampala
- Map of Kampala
- Coordinates: 00°18′54″N 32°35′11″E
- Country: Uganda
- Region: Central Uganda
- District: Kampala District
- Time zone: UTC+3 (EAT)

There are five divisions of Kampala, the capital and largest city of Uganda.

Kampala's name is derived from a local name of antelopes called 'mpala'. The many antelopes that used to harbor on the rolling hills with grassy wetlands made the residents to call the place a hill of mpala"akasozi k'empala". As years passed, the name of akasozi ke mapala was changed to akasozi Kampala to literally mean the Antelopes hill when the hill had started to emerge as a city. Kampala is composed of seven hills: Mengo hill, Kasubi hill, Kibuli hill, Namirembe hill, Lubaga hill, Old Kampala hill and Nsambya hill.

The city of Kampala, Uganda's capital, is administered by the Kampala Capital City Authority (KCCA). KCCA is administratively divided into five divisions, each headed by a mayor. The whole city is politically headed by the Lord Mayor whose title initially was called the Mayor and is elected by the Kampala people.Lord Mayor, the Executive Director who us appointed by the President and has the administrative powers with the help of the minister of Kampala. The current Lord Mayor of Kampala is Erias Lukwago. The Kampala City since Independence has been led by different Mayors as listed below:

1. Sir Amar main (C.B.E) 1950-1955 after serving as the Kampala Municipal Board Chairman
2. K.H Dale (O.B.E) 1955-1956
3. C.S Lewis (1956-1958)
4. C.E Develin (1958-1959)
5. S.W Kulubya (C.B.E) 1951-1961. Kulubya is the first Ugandan Mayor of Kampala
6. Mrs. B.Saben (C.B.E) 1961-1962. Saben is the first woman Mayor of Kampala
7. P.L Patel (1962-1963)
8. P.N Kavuma (O.B.E) (1963-1965)
9. W.Y Nega (1965- 1968)
10. A.G Mehta (1969-1969). He passed on from Office.
11. Nakibinge (1969- 1971)
12. Walusimbi Mpanga(1971- 1982)
13. Semaganda Fred (1982-1986)
14. Wasswa Ziritwawula (1986-1989)
15. Yiga Christopher (1989- 1997)
16. Nasser Ntege Ssebaggala 1998. He was directly elected but lost Office after being convicted by the Court and was replaced by his deputy Sarah Nkonge who acted as the Mayor until June 1999 when John Sebaana Kizito was elected as the second directly elected Mayor of Kampala from 2001.

In 2002, John Sebaana Kizito again contested and was re-elected who later was replaced by Nasser Ntege Ssebaggala from 2006-2011. In 2011, he was succeeded by Erias Lukwago who has served as the Lord Mayor for 15 years since 2011 until 20 January 2026 when he was defeated by Ronald Balimwezo Nsubuga of National Unity Paltform who ended his tenure.(https://softpower.ug/ronald-balimwezo-wins-kampala-lord-mayor-ending-lukwagos-15-year-tenure)

== Overview ==
The five divisions that comprise the city of Kampala are:

Administrative Divisions of Kampala Capital City Authority
Rank	Name of Division	Name of Mayor
1	Kampala Central Division	Charles Sserunjogi
2	Kawempe Division	His Worship Dr Emmanuel Serunjogi
3	Rubaga Division	Joyce Nabbosa Ssebugwawo
4	Makindye Division	Kasirye Nganda Mulyanyama
5	Nakawa Division	Ronald Balimwezi
