= Joyce Nabbosa Ssebugwawo =

Ugandan politician

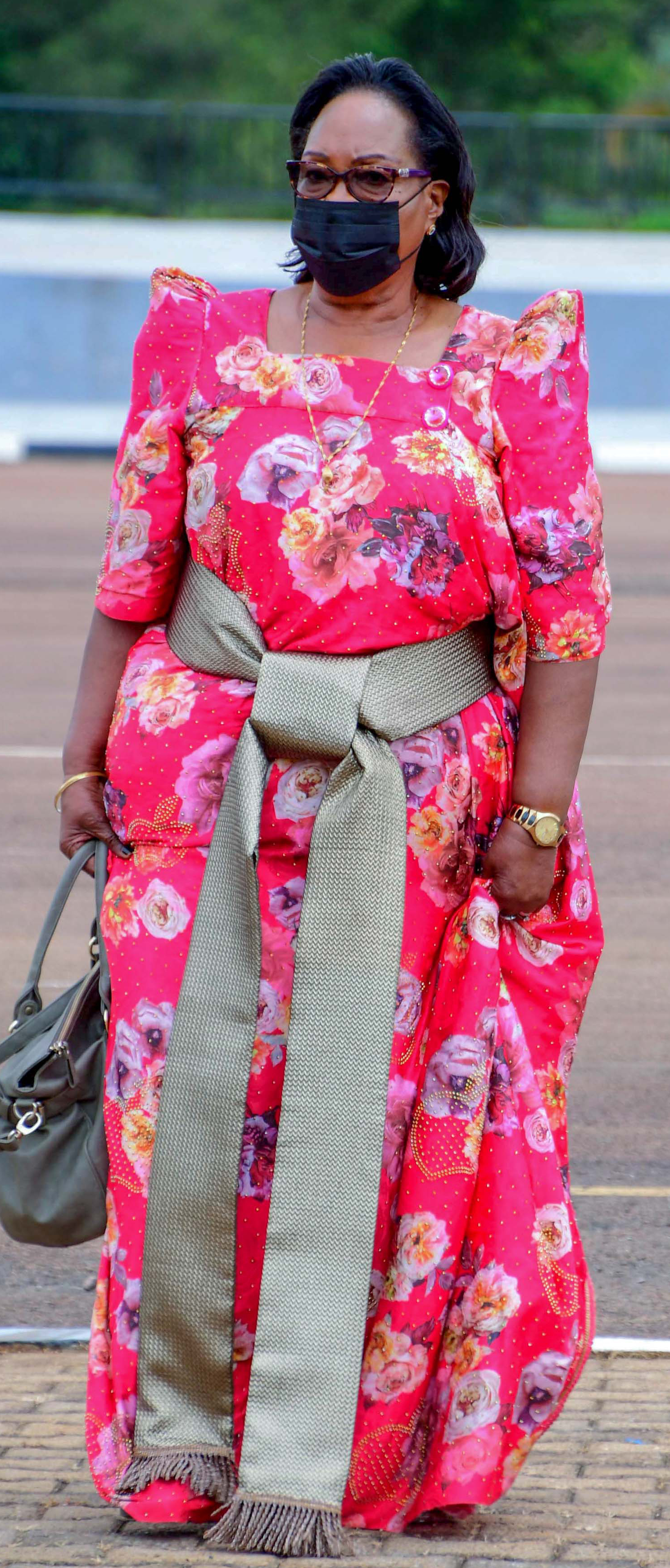
- Joyce Nabbosa SSsebuggwawo

Personal details
- Born: Joyce Nabbosa
- Citizenship: Uganda
- Occupation: Politician
- Known for: Politics

Joyce Nabbosa Ssebugwawo is a Ugandan politician, entrepreneur and the current Minister of State for Information Communication Technology and National Guidance.

She is a former minister in the Buganda government. She joined the Buganda government in the early 1980s, where she worked as a Minister for women, community work and mobilisation. A former National Chairperson of Forum for Democratic Change, she is a former Mayor for Rubaga Division in Kampala and an aunt (by marriage) to Queen Sylvia of Buganda.

== See also ==
- Forum for Democratic Change
- Rubaga Division
- Kampala Capital City Authority
- Divisions of Kampala
