= Erias Lukwago =

Ugandan lawyer & politician (born 1970)

The Worshipful Erias Lukwago
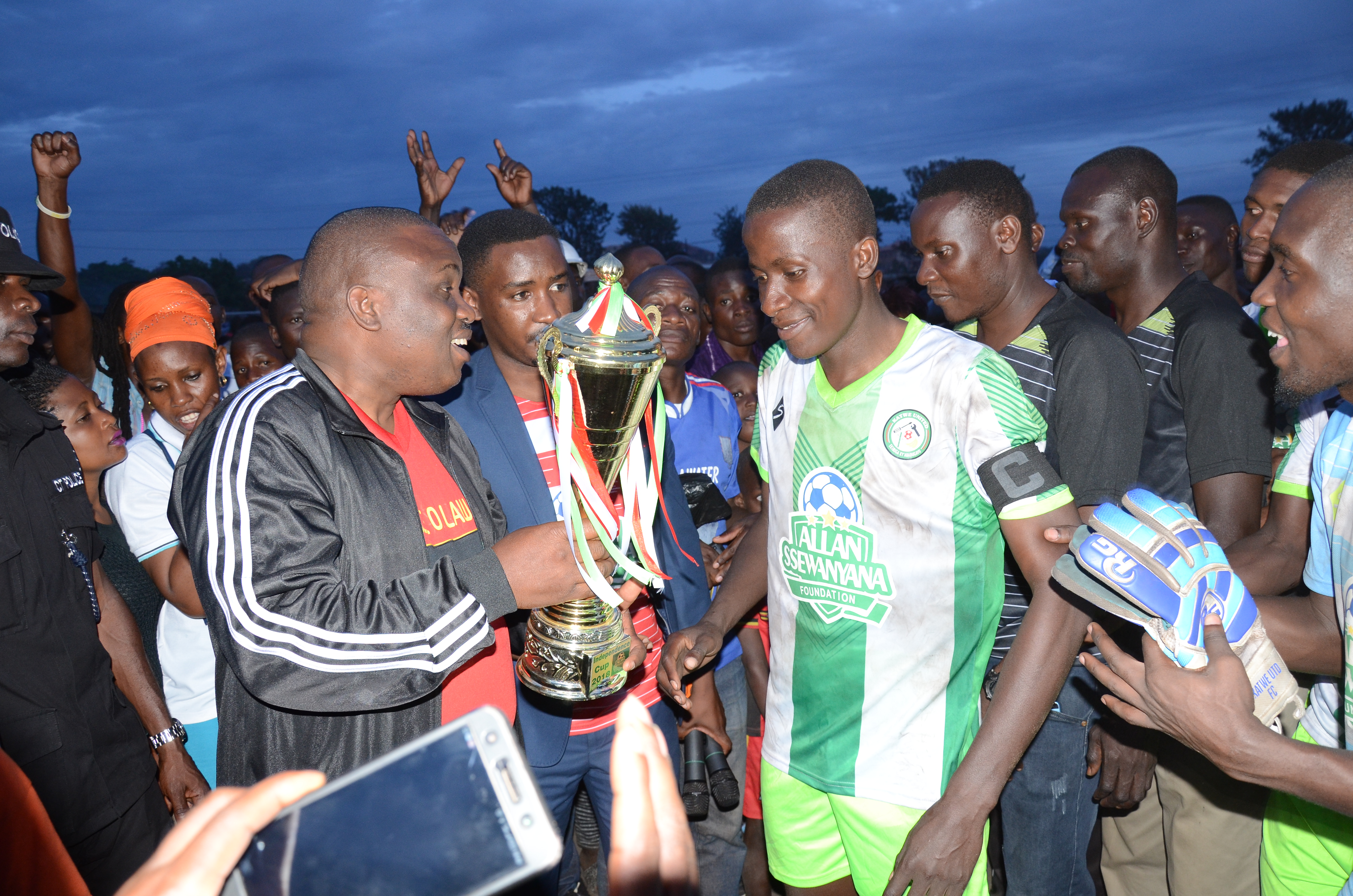
- Lord Mayor Elias Lukwago (centre left) awarding the Independence Cup (2018)

19th Lord Mayor of Kampala
- In office 15 January 2011 – 22 January 2026
- Preceded by: Nasser Sebaggala
- Succeeded by: Ronald Nsubuga

Personal details
- Born: 11 May 1970 (age 56) Kabale, Uganda
- Citizenship: Uganda
- Spouse: Zawedde Lubwama Lukwago Nnalongo
- Education: Makerere University (Bachelor of Laws); Law Development Centre (Diploma in Legal Practice)
- Occupation: Lawyer, politician
- Known for: Politics, Law

Erias Lukwago Ssalongo (born 11 May 1970) is a Ugandan lawyer and politician who served as the 19th mayor of Kampala, the capital city of Uganda, from January 2011 to January 2026. He was defeated by Ronald Balimwezo in the January 2026 general election, who succeeded him as mayor.

He was first elected on 15 January 2011 during the 2011 general elections. He was voted out of office on 25 November 2013 by councillors after a tribunal found him guilty of incompetence and abuse of office. The Kampala Capital City Authority councillors voted 29 to 3 to impeach him. He was re-instated on 28 November 2013 after the high court judge Yasin Nyanzi ordered Kampala minister Frank Tumwebaze to stop the implementation of the tribunal report that paved way for his censure.

After being re-elected in the January 2021 general election, Lukwago was sworn in for his third term as Lord Mayor of Kampala in May 2021. He was subsequently defeated in the January 2026 general election.

== Background and education ==
He was born in Kabungo Village, in present-day Kalungu District, on 11 May 1970, to Muhhamoud Mirundi and Salmati Nakayaga. Lukwago is reported to have more than twenty siblings. Lukwago attended Makerere University from 1995 to 1997, graduating with a Bachelor of Laws degree. He went on to obtain a Diploma in Legal Practice from the Law Development Center in 1998. He also holds a Certificate in Advocacy Skills from the International Law Institute.

== Political career ==
Since 1998, Lukwago has worked as the managing partner in the offices of Lukwago and Company Advocates, a Kampala-based law firm that specializes in constitutional law and human rights law. In 2005, he was elected to the Parliament of Uganda, on the Democratic Party ticket, representing the Kampala Central Constituency. While in parliament, he served on the Legal and Parliamentary Affairs Committee and on the Local Government Accounts Committee. He resigned from Parliament in 2011 and was elected Lord Mayor of the City of Kampala. Lukwago has in the past served as national legal adviser to the Democratic Party in Uganda, and as Shadow Minister for Justice and Constitutional Affairs.

On 20 May 2011, Lukwago was sworn in as Lord Mayor of Kampala for a five-year term. In 2016 he was sworn in for his second term. In 2013, Lukwago was impeached by councillors of the Kampala Capital City Authority on allegations of abuse of office, misconduct and incompetence, and his office at City Hall was closed. He challenged the impeachment in court, and the High Court later declared it unlawful. Following his re-election in the February 2016 general election, Lukwago faced delays in accessing his office, with officials citing a court directive maintaining the status quo, while he accused the government and President Yoweri Museveni of undermining his mandate. On 26 May 2021, he was sworn in for his third term as the Lord Mayor of Kampala Capital City.

== Allegations and disputes ==
In 2025, Lukwago faced internal disputes within the Kampala Capital City Authority council relating to land management and development issues, including matters concerning the Nakivubo Channel and land in Nakawuka. Councillor Faridah Nakabugo publicly accused him of involvement in alleged irregular land compensation schemes and raised concerns about a potential conflict of interest involving his private legal practice. She further alleged that individuals associated with him had sought compensation for land under dispute. Lukwago denied the accusations, and no court ruling or formal charges were reported in connection with the claims.

The tensions between Lukwago and some councillors later escalated into a public confrontation at City Hall, where Nakabugo reportedly sought clarification over statements she claimed had damaged her political reputation. The incident was defused without physical altercation. The exchanges reflected broader political disagreements within the council, particularly concerning urban development projects and the management of public land, ahead of the 2026 local government elections.

On 15 June 2026, armed military personnel raided Lukwago's residence in Wakaliga, scaling the perimeter wall to take him into custody. Following his detention, Chief of Defence Forces General Muhoozi Kainerugaba confirmed the action on the social platform X, posting photographs depicting a blindfolded Lukwago. On 17 June 2026, after a brief period at the Kira Division Police Station, Lukwago was brought before the Makindye Chief Magistrate's Court. He was formally charged with misprision of treason for allegedly concealing knowledge of a plot to overthrow the government, a charge he denied before being remanded to Luzira Maximum Security Prison.

On 22 June 2026, Lukwago appeared before the Makindye Chief Magistrate's Court for the ruling on his bail application, which was sought on medical grounds due to worsening health issues, including gastritis, a dislocated spinal disc allegedly sustained during his detention, and a low white blood cell count. Chief Magistrate Sarah Basemera deferred the ruling, citing complex legal considerations and security concerns surrounding the courtroom, announcing that the decision would instead be delivered electronically through the Electronic Court Case Management Information System (ECCMIS). Lukwago was further remanded to Luzira Prison until 30 June 2026. Concurrently, Kenyan human rights lawyer Martha Karua, who had travelled to Uganda to join Lukwago's defence team and observe the proceedings, was detained at Entebbe International Airport and forcefully deported back to Kenya.

== Personal life ==
Lukwago is married to Zawedde Lubwama Lukwago and they have six children including twins. He has in the past been a member of the Democratic Party (DP) in Uganda, although in the 2011 elections he ran as an independent. On 28 July 2020, he officially joined the Forum for Democratic Change, (FDC) political party.

== See also ==
- Kampala Capital City Authority
- Forum for Democratic Change
- Medard Lubega Sseggona
