= Mengo Senior School =

Location
- Kampala, Central Region; Uganda; 00°19′14″N 32°33′42″E

Information
- Type: Public middle school and high school (8-13)
- Motto: Akwana Akira Ayomba (Make friends and never foes)
- Established: 1895
- Principal: Dr. Nantagya Grace Ssebanakita
- Enrollment: 8667
- Slogan: Fearing God, Integrity and Respect of persons and property
- Athletics: Soccer, netball, woodball, lawn tennis, table tennis, volleyball, and basketball
- Nickname: MENGO
- Publication: The Mengo Star
- Alumni: MENGONIANS, BANNAMENGO
- Website: www.mengoss.sc.ug

Mengo Senior School, also known as Mengo SS, is a comprehensive, mixed day school in Kampala. As of March 2026, it had over 8667 students, 430 staff including 344 teachers.

== Location ==
Mengo SS is located on Namirembe Hill, along Hoima Road in Lubaga Division, in the north-western part of Kampala, the capital and largest city of Uganda. The coordinates of the school are 0°19'14.0"N, 32°33'42.0"E (Latitude:0.320556; Longitude:32.561667).

== History ==
Having been founded in 1895 by the Church Missionary Society, the school is the oldest school in Uganda. According to the school magazine, Akwana, the school complex started as an informal home school where a missionary, Miss Chadwick, taught reading and writing. Her students were mainly youth who came to her house for prayers every afternoon.

Most of the boys Chadwick taught were houseboys of the missionaries. After a while, she began sending them to chiefs, asking that the latter send their children to her for lessons. Soon, the potential of her efforts began to be noticed. As the number of Chadwick's learners grew, it was realised that her house was no longer sufficient to serve as a school. The missionaries, eager to use formal education to fuel their religious work, established a standard formal school on Chadwick's foundation.

In 1895, an elementary mixed school known as Kayanja was founded at Mengo, making it one of the first standard formal schools in Uganda. The school's location and appearance are thus described by A. K. Sempa in his 1941 article African Schools. The first school building was a reed-walled structure, with a grass-thatched roof.

The magazine points out that most of the first students who enrolled in the first Mengo School (Kayanja) became school masters posted by Church Councils to rural areas. Many became clerks and chiefs. The number of learners attending the school grew. It soon became necessary to house the learners in a boarding school. The Prime Minister of Buganda (Katikkiro), Apollo Kaggwa, gave them his house on Namirembe Hill, which they used for nine years.

But the numbers kept growing, with students coming from as far as Busoga, Bunyoro, Toro, and Ankole. As a result, a larger school was needed. In June 1904, the Church Missionary Society held a conference where it was resolved to build two new schools. One on Namirembe Hill and another at Buddo.

The schools were to produce men fit to serve God. By the end of 1904, a boarding school had been set up. The school was named Mengo High School with 250 students. The subjects taught included arithmetic, geography, and elementary science.

== Reputation ==
Academically, Mengo Senior School is ranked among the best secondary schools in Uganda and currently the best performing day school because of its continued academic excellence, especially at A-level.

== Notable alumni ==
- James Mulwana - Industrialist, businessman, and entrepreneur.
- Senteza Kajubi - Academic and academic administrator.
- Charles Hamya - Businessman and one of the wealthiest individuals in Uganda.
- Steven Kavuma - judge of the Uganda Court of Appeals.
- Muyanja Mbabaali - Ugandan politician and businessman.
- Allan Ssewanyana - Ugandan sports journalist.
- Mugalu Najib Mohsin - Interior and landscape designer.
