= Allan Ssewanyana =

Ugandan politician

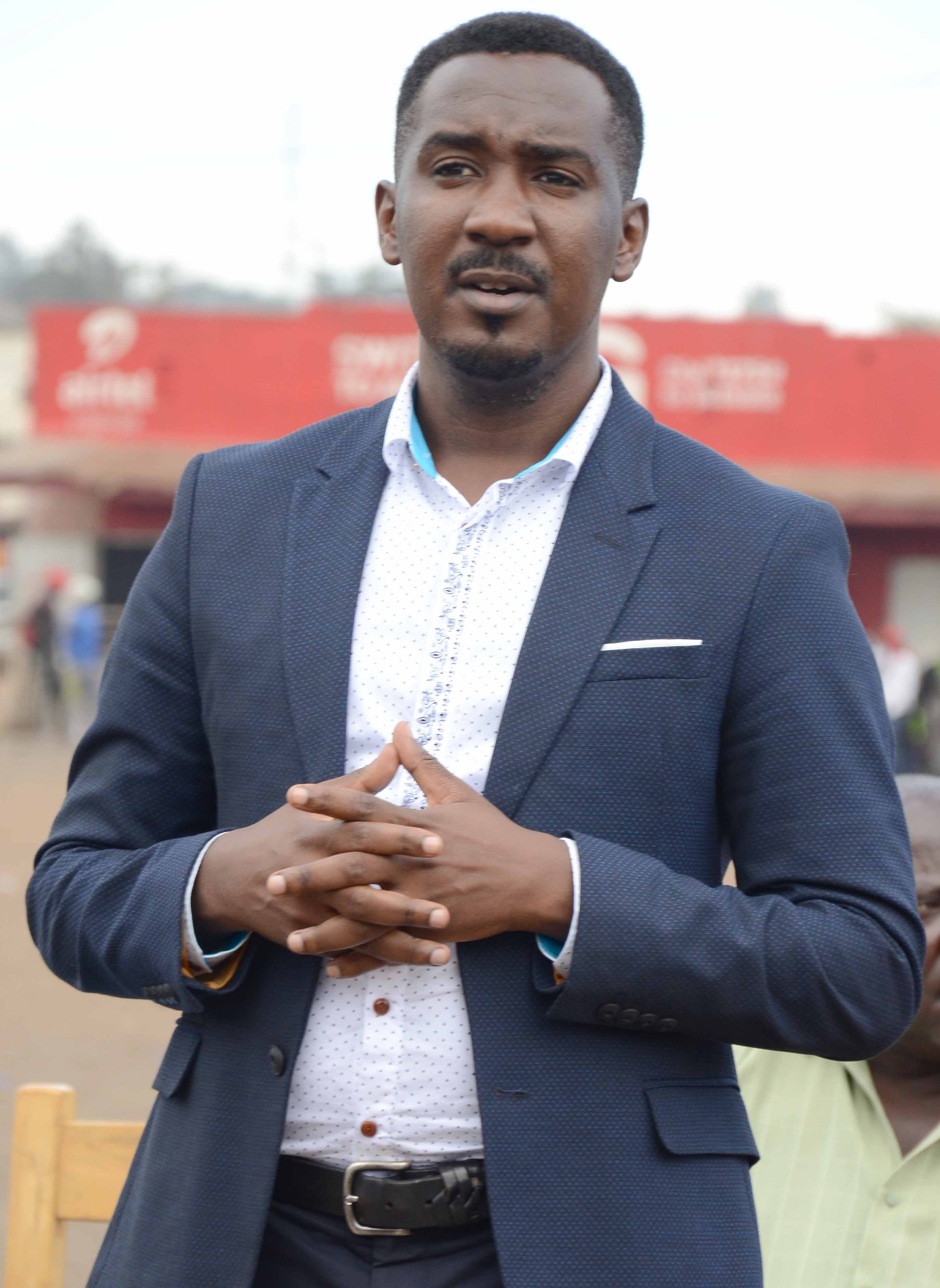
- Allan Ssewanyana (2017)

Honorable

Personal details
- Born: Allan Ssewanyana; 26 November 1986 (age 39) Kampala, Uganda
- Citizenship: Uganda
- Spouse: Lydia Ssewanyana
- Education: Makerere University (BSc Human Resource Management)
- Occupation: Sports journalist, politician
- Known for: Sports journalism, politics

Allan Aloysius Ssewanyana (born 26 November 1986), commonly known as ‘Omusajja wa Bwino’ is a Ugandan sports journalist, human resource manager and politician. He is a former Member of Parliament for Makindye Division West, representing the National Unity Platform, the largest opposition political party in Uganda. He is a member of the Committee on Education & Sports and the Committee on Equal Opportunities in the 10th Parliament of Uganda. He is also the Minister for Sports in the Shadow Cabinet.

Ssewanyana is a former: LCV Councillor for Kampala Capital City Authority (KCCA) representing Makindye Division; sports editor for Nile Broadcasting Services (NBS) TV and Top Radio 89.6 FM; sports columnist for Ennyanda sports newspaper; member of the board of directors for the Uganda Premier League and a former board vice chairperson for KCCA FC.

== Early life and education ==
Ssewanyana was born in Nsambya Hospital to Aloysius and Sarah Ssendawula of Kibuye, on 26 November 1986 in a Catholic family of the Baganda. He is the third of seven children and has four sisters and two brothers.

He had his primary education in Kampala City at Nakivubo Blue Primary School where he was a sports prefect and attained his PLE certification in 1998.

He then attended St. Mathias Kalemba Senior Secondary School for his O-Level education and Mengo Senior School for his A-Level education, attaining a UCE certification in 2002 and a UACE certification in 2005. He served as a sports minister at St. Mathias Kalemba Senior Secondary School and as a head prefect at Mengo Senior School.

Ssewanyana further advanced to Makerere University, where he graduated in 2008 with a Bachelor of Science in Human Resource Management. He was a student leader and a member of the guild representative council (GRC) at the Ivory Tower.

== Career and politics ==
On attaining his UACE Certification, Ssewanyana was employed as a sports editor at Top Radio 89.6 FM in 2005. Upon acquiring his bachelor's degree in 2008, he secured employment as a sports presenter for NBS TV, introducing and hosting the daily NBS Lunchtime Sports program. In 2014, he additionally became a sports columnist for the weekly sports newspaper Ennyanda.

In 2013, Ssewanyana contested for the Federation of Uganda Football Associations (FUFA) presidency in a bid to replace the then FUFA President, Lawrence Mulindwa. He was eliminated on technicalities that found only one candidate, a one Moses Magogo, eligible who eventually went through unopposed.

In 2011, Ssewanyana joined elective politics on the DP ticket, becoming an LCV Councillor for Kampala Capital City Authority (KCCA) representing the constituents of Makindye West up until 2016 when he was elected to serve the same constituency in a more prestigious position of member of parliament thereby becoming a member of the 10th Parliament for the Pearl of Africa.

In the 10th Parliament, Ssewanyana serves on the Committee on Education & Sports and the Committee on Equal Opportunities

"I am so proud of the way we dealt with the issue of Article 102 (b) of the constitution using mechanisms that to some looked bogus but made a mark. Allan Ssewanyana arrested for inciting violence. "Ssewanyana arrested over Kiruddu hospital sewage protests"

Ssewanyana intended to run as an independent candidate for the 2026 elections after failing to secure the party ticket.

He lost his MP seat to Zahara Luyirika during the 2026 elections.

== Personal details ==
Allan Ssewanyana is married to Lydia Ssewanyana, and they have two children. He served as the vice chairperson for KCCA FC from 2012 to 2015 and as a member of the board of directors for the Uganda Premier League in the same period. Ssewanyana is the co-owner and current chairperson of Katwe United FC. He personally played football at the National League level for Top TV FC from 2001 up until 2004, when he fractured his collarbone, the injury that all but ended his footballing career.

In September 2021, Allan Sewanyana was charged with murder linked to machette killings inthe Masaka su-regional -region.

== Awards and honours ==
Ssewanyana has been awarded the following honours over the years:

- 2013: RTV Academy Awards Best TV Sports Presenter
- 2014: RTV Academy Awards Best Radio & TV Sports Presenter
- 2014: Kadanke Awards Best Youth Leadership Award
- 2015: RTV Academy Awards Most Outstanding Sports Presenter
- 2015: Best of the Best (BB) Awards TV Sports Presenter
- 2017: Buzz Teeniez Awards Teeniez Leadership Award

== See also ==
- Kampala District
- Democratic Party (Uganda)
- Parliament of Uganda
- Kampala Capital City Authority
