= Nasser Sebaggala =

Ugandan politician (1947–2020)

Nasser Ntege Sebaggala

Mayor of Kampala
- In office 2006–2011
- Preceded by: John Ssebaana Kizito
- Succeeded by: Erias Lukwago (as lord mayor)
- In office 1998–1999
- Preceded by: Christopher Iga
- Succeeded by: John Ssebaana Kizito

Personal details
- Born: 15 November 1947 Kampala, Uganda
- Died: 26 September 2020 (aged 72) Kampala, Uganda
- Party: Democratic (before 2006)
- Profession: Businessman

Nasser Ntege Sebaggala (15 November 1947 – 26 September 2020) was a Ugandan businessman and politician who was Mayor of Kampala from 2006 to 2011. He was an independent presidential candidate in the 2006 general election before dropping out and joining the Kampala mayoral race.

== Background and education ==
He was born in Kampala, Uganda's capital city, on 15 November 1947. Nasser died on 26 September 2020.

== Career ==
Following the expulsion of Asians by Idi Amin in 1972, Nasser Sebaggala acquired a supermarket called UGANTICO on Nkrumah Road, the lower entrance to current CHAM towers, an electronics and clothes store on Kampala Road, the main thoroughfare in Kampala. His business interests grew over time. In 1998, he began his political career by running for the position of Mayor of Kampala. Ostensibly a member of the Democratic Party, Sebaggala won the first direct elections for mayor of Kampala in 1998, beating two government-sponsored candidates. However, he was arrested in the United States two months later, in June 1998, on eight counts of fraud and lying to US customs officials. In February 1999, he received a 15-month sentence but was paroled in December 1999. He returned to Kampala in February 2000 to a warm welcome and considered a bid in the 2001 presidential elections.

In mid-December 2005, he broke with the Democratic Party (DP), after he came third in the party presidential primaries, which was won by Ssebaana Kizito, and registered himself as an independent. A week later, he reversed his decision, withdrawing his candidacy and announcing his support for Kizito. When he lost the Democratic Party nominations to Norbert Mao in 2010, he quit the DP and formed his own party.

== See also ==
- John Ssebaana Kizito
- Erias Lukwago
- Kampala Capital City Authority
- Jennifer Musisi

Preceded by Christopher Iga; As Mayor of Kampala	Mayor of Kampala; 1998–1999	Succeeded by John Ssebaana Kizito

Preceded by John Ssebaana Kizito; As Mayor of Kampala	Mayor of Kampala; 2006–2011	Succeeded by Erias Lukwago; As Lord Mayor of Kampala
