= Charles Hamya =

Ugandan businessman

- Born: 1973 (age 52–53); Uganda
- Citizenship: Uganda
- Education: Mengo Senior School (EACE & EAACE)
- Occupation: Business executive
- Years active: 2005–present
- Title: Executive Director

Charles Hamya (born 1973) is a Ugandan businessman. He was the managing director of MultiChoice Uganda Limited, a digital communications network provider, until his resignation in January 2019. He is reported to be one of the country's wealthiest individuals. He also served on the board of directors of Uganda Airlines from May 2019 to 2022 when the board was suspended amid reports of underperformance, abuse of office and financial mismanagement. He resigned from Uganda Airlines board in January 2022 after being cleared of any wrongdoing by the shareholders.

== Background and education ==
He was born in Uganda in 1973. He attended the oldest school in Uganda, Mengo Senior School, established in 1895.

== Career ==
He started out as the Chief Accountant at MultiChoice Uganda Limited, during the early 2000s. He rose to the rank of General Manager and later assumed the position of Managing Director and CEO. In 2015, his monthly salary, excluding allowances, was reported at over USh50.7 million (approximately US$14,000).

He is currently the Executive Director of HCH Financial Services and also remains a special advisor to MultiChoice Uganda. Has since been appointed and is the current Board Chairman of MultiChoice Uganda Limited.
