= Muyanja Mbabaali =

Ugandan politician

Muyanja Mbabaali Honorable
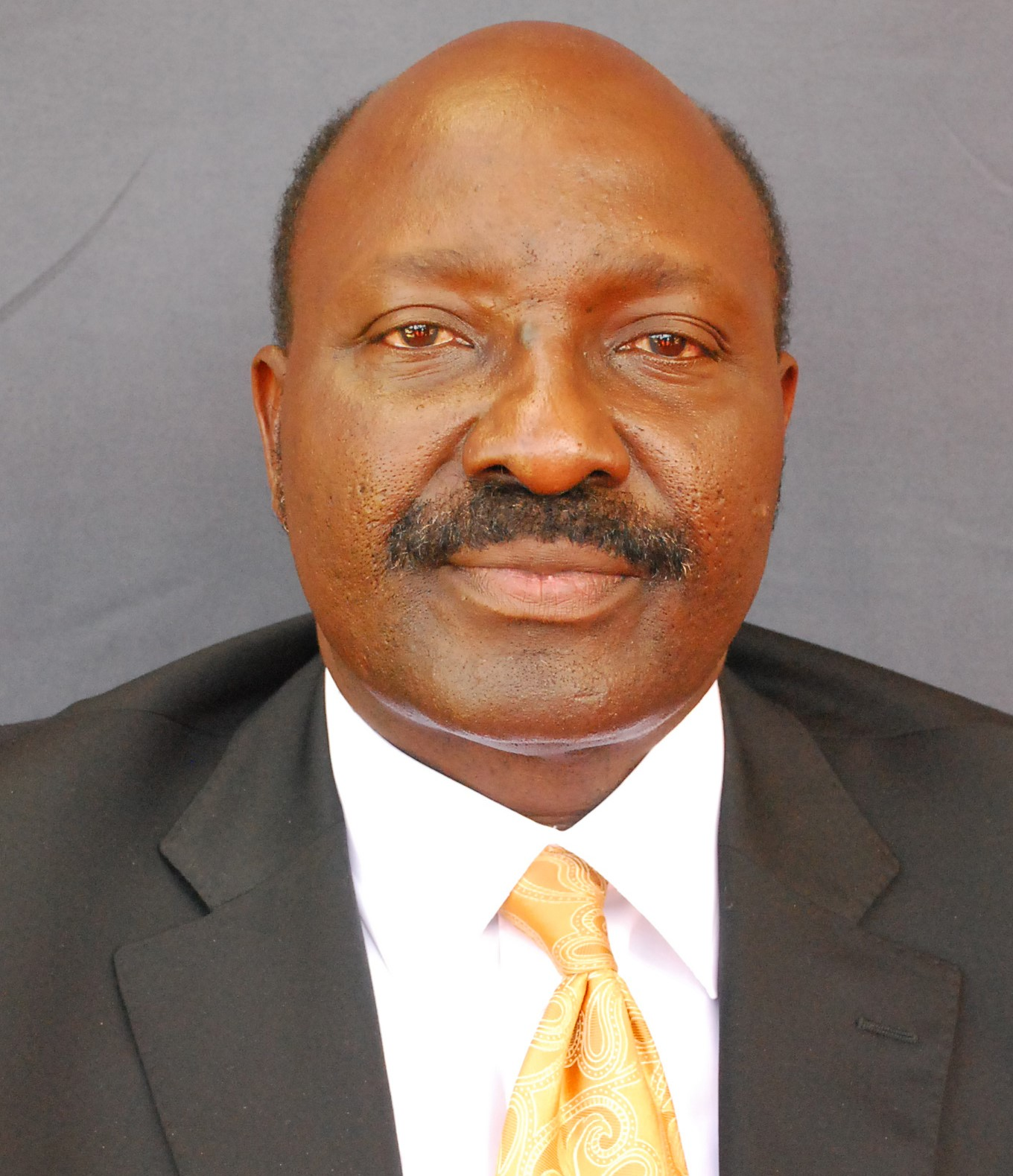
- Hon. Muyanja Mbabaali

Member of Parliament for Bukoto County South Lwengo District
- In office May 21, 2011 – May 21, 2020

Personal details
- Born: 23 October 1953 Lwengo District
- Party: National Resistance Movement
- Spouse: Mariam Rose Najjemba
- Education: Nkumba University (Bachelor in Public Administration); Uganda Pentecostal University (Diploma in Information Technology); London Graduate School (Certificate in Leadership and Management); London Graduate School (Doctorate causa in Leadership and Management)
- Occupation: Politician, Public administrator, Businessman, economist
- Known for: Politics, Public Administration, leadership, economics, business

Muyanja Mbabaali also known as Hajj Muhammad Muyanja Mbabaali (born October 23, 1953) is a Ugandan politician, businessman and public administrator. He is best known for serving as the Member of Parliament for Bukoto County South, Lwengo District, following the 2011 general election under the National Resistance Movement (NRM).

== Early life and education ==
Muyanja Mbabaali was born on 23 October 1953 in Lwengo District in the Central Region of Uganda. He attended Kikungwe Primary school in Masaka in late 60s then Mengo Secondary School for his O’Level from 1971 to 1974. Over the years, he pursued several qualifications: bachelor's degree in public administration and management from Nkumba University, a doctorate causa in leadership and management (2018) and a master class certificate in leadership and management (2018), both from the Commonwealth University - London Graduate School.

Muyanja holds a diploma in information technology from Uganda Pentecostal University (2015), a Mature Age Entry Certificate from Makerere University (2013), and a bachelor's degree in public administration and management from Nkumba University (2004). Additionally, he earned an accountancy diploma from the Association of Professional Accountancy Students in 1989.

== Business career ==
Before and alongside his political career, Mbabaali has been involved in several private enterprises and commercial ventures. He served as chairman and Founder of INTREPCO Ltd, a service company representing international firms in Uganda. He was Africa Regional Representative for SELEX an Italian radar equipment manufacturer. He has chaired and operated companies in property development, hospitality and agriculture. In 2020s, his business interests faced financial challenges including debt issues leading to bank moving to seize or auction properties after alleged loan defaults.

== Political career and working experience ==
Hon. Muyanja's career spans various fields, including business, trade, property development, and politics. From 1982 to 1987, he served as chairman and founder of INTREPCO Limited Uganda, representing several international companies and securing major contracts for the Government of Uganda. Between March 1983 and 1987, he acted as the East German (GDR) agent in Uganda, overseeing barter trade between the Ugandan Government and East Germany, facilitating significant exchanges of goods.

In April 1987, he founded the former 3M Corporation and MFK Corporation, focusing on property development and large-scale farming. From July 1996 to 2002, he served as executive director and founder of Southern Investments Limited in Kampala, a company specializing in property development and representing global firms such as Impregilo, which constructed the Jinja Hydro Power Dam, and Arab Consulting Engineers, responsible for rehabilitating Kampala's Nakivubo drainage channel.

Between February 1997 and 2000, he chaired the Uganda-Rwanda Joint Committee for Trade and Investment under the Uganda National Chamber of Commerce and Industry, promoting trade between Uganda and Rwanda and supporting the lifting of trade sanctions on Burundi. From 1998 to 2004, he was a director and chairman of finance and procurement at the National Medical Stores under the Ministry of Health. During the same period, he also served as a director at Crystal Communications (Uganda) Limited, representing VERTEX RSI Global Communications (formerly COMSAT RSI) in upgrading digital communication systems and satellite installations for Ugandan radio and television stations.

From January 2001 to 2003, he chaired BIMA Consulting, a local Oracle partner providing structural management consultancy services. Since February 2007, he has been Africa regional representative for SELEX, an Italian manufacturer of radar equipment. He also served as director and chairman of finance and procurement at Uganda Air Cargo from 2007 to 2011 and as vice chairman of the UMEME Interim Review of Electricity Tariff Committee from July to October 2009.

Since 2002, he has chaired several businesses, including Travel Hotels, ZAMO Hotels Limited, ZAMO Courts, and ZAMO Industries. He served as chairman of the NRM Lwengo District from 2010 to 2015 and was elected honorable member of Parliament for Bukoto South Constituency from 2011 to 2012. From 2015 to 2020, he was appointed minister of state in charge of investments under the Ministry of Finance in Uganda.

His election was, however, nullified by the High Court, with the unseating party citing the fact that he did not possess the required academic qualifications for the position. He was also nominated as state minister for investments in the Ugandan Cabinet but was rejected by the parliamentary vetting committee after accusations that his academic papers were forged.

== Parliamentary work ==
In 2011, Mbabaali won the parliamentary seat for Bukoto South Constituency serving as its MP. His elections was later nulliefied by Ugandan courts on grounds that he lacked the minimum academic qualifications required for parliament a decision upheld on appeal.

== Ministerial appointment ==
He was nominated as state minister for investments in the Ministry of Finance but his appointment was rejected by Parliament's vetting committee largely due to concerns over his academic qualifications.

== After Parliament ==
After losing his Parliamentary seat and in subsequent years, Mbabaali has remained active in politics. He exitede national elections in the mid-2020s citing irregularities in party primaries. In 2025, he made a comeback in NRM politics winning the party's Bukoto South primary aheadof the 2026 general elections. His candidacy has drawn cross-party endorsements including support from leaders and political parties.

== Award and Honors ==
Commonwealth University awarded Mbabaali an honorary doctorate (Doctorate causa) for his contributions in leadership and service and this was confirmed during the Dubai Leaders’ Summit in April 2018.

== Controversies ==
Mbabaali's career has been marked by multiple public controversies. Court cases and media reports questioned whether he met the academic requirements of parliamentary offices leading to the nullification of his election and rejection of his nomination as minister. On cases of property and debt issues, reports indicate that banks have moved to seize or auction several of his properties due to unpaid loans. With claims of land ownership, he has publicly asserted ownership of Lake Birinzi land, a move that has attracted debate over land rights and public resources.

== Personal life ==
Mbabaali is married to Mariam Rose Najjemba, a fellow Ugandan politician who served in Parliament and cabinet.

== Languages spoken ==
Mbabaali speaks three different languages and these include; Luganda, English and Swahili.

== See also ==
- Parliament of Uganda
- Cabinet of Uganda
- Lakes in Uganda
