= Christopher Iga =

Ugandan politician

Mayor of Kampala
- In office 1989–1997
- Preceded by: Joseph Wasswa Ziritwawula
- Succeeded by: Nasser Ntege Ssebagala

Personal details
- Occupation: Politician
- Known for: Serving as Mayor of Kampala

Christopher Iga (born 15 August 1933) is a Ugandan politician. He was mayor of Kampala from 1989 to 1997 when he was replaced by Nasser Ntege Ssebagala.

== Early life and education ==
He was born on 15 August 1933 to Boaz Wakiku and Ziporah. He attended Mengo Secondary School for his secondary education. He lives in Butege village in the outskirts of Mukono district.

He was also an actor and he loved drama. He was part of the casting crew in Kampala City Players though all this ended after the death of Byron Kawadwa whom he considered to be his mentor in drama. Later on, he retreated himself by establishing an auditing firm, Associated Central Accountants and Company in 1973. He had worked as a chief accountant at Mitchell Courts, a company that was owned by the Belgians. He also served on various boards of schools and Nsambya Hospital for 20 years.

== Political career ==
He started his political career at the LC1 level, but soon rose to LC3 chairperson, Makindye Division in 1987. He then became the mayor of Kampala from 1989 to 1997 when he was replaced by Nasser Ntege Ssebagala. In his 8-year service as the major of Kampala, he fundraised funds from World Bank Funds and constructed markets of Nateete and Bugolobi. He also raised funds to build a new taxi park from the defunct Kampala City Council coffers.

From 1999 to 2000, he worked as the Residential District Commissioner, RDC of Masaka. Still in the same capacity, he served in Bushenyi district from 2000 to 2002 when he was replaced by Bamusedde Bwambale.

== Personal life ==
He married Deborah whom he met in 1962 but on a sad note she passed on.

== See also ==
- Nasser Sebaggala
- John Ssebaana Kizito
