= Amar Maini =

Sir Amar Nath Maini (31 July 1911 – 1999) was a Kenyan lawyer who became a prominent politician in British Uganda, and the first Mayor of Kampala.

== Biography ==
He was born in Nairobi, East Africa Protectorate in 1911 to Indian Punjabi Hindu parents who had migrated to East Africa from Ludhiana, Punjab, India. He was educated at the Government Indian School in Nairobi and the London School of Economics in the United Kingdom. Thereafter, he studied law and was called to the Bar at Middle Temple.

On completion of his studies, Maini returned to Kenya and practiced as a barrister in Nairobi for a number of years. He served as a Member of Nairobi's Municipal Council between 1933 and 1939. In 1942, he moved to Kampala, Uganda where he soon became active in Ugandan politics and served as a member of the Kampala Township Authority and chairman of the Kampala Municipal Council. He was a member of Uganda's Legislative Council for seventeen years between 1944 and 1961. During this time he served as the Minister of Corporations and Regional Communications between 1955 and 1958, and Minister of Commerce and Industry between 1958 and 1961. Regarded as one of the ablest men in Uganda at the time, the appointment of an Asian minister was met with considerable African opposition. In 1950 he became the first Mayor of Kampala, and remained in the post until 1955. He was awarded a knighthood in the Queen's 1957 New Year Honours for public service in Uganda. In 1961 he became the first East African born Speaker of East African Central Legislative Assembly.

On retirement in 1969, he migrated to the United Kingdom and passed away in London in August 1999 at the age of 88. He was the father of Sir Ravinder Maini.
