= Robert Ssewagudde =

Hon. Robert Ssewagudde

National Member of Parliament for Persons with Disabilities
- Incumbent
- Assumed office 2026
- Constituency: Persons with Disabilities (National)

Personal details
- Born: Rusukum Division, Wakiso District, Uganda
- Party: National Resistance Movement (NRM)
- Occupation: Politician, Disability rights advocate
- Known for: Advocacy for rights of Persons with Disabilities

Robert Ssewagudde is a Ugandan politician and disability rights advocate representing People With Disabilities (PWDs) in the 12th Parliament of Uganda as a member of the National Resistance Movement.

== Early life ==
Robert comes from Busukuma Division, Wakiso District, Central Region. He lost his hearing at the age of seven after a severe malaria attack. He comes from a family where he is the only deaf child among 8 brothers and 2 sisters.

== Career ==
He is the National Member of Parliament representing Persons with Disabilities (PWDs) in the 12th Parliament of Uganda. During his swearing-in, he pledged to focus on addressing unemployment among PWDs, despite many of them being qualified professionals.

In addition to his political career, he is the co-founder and executive director of Deaf Sign Alliance, an organisation advocating for the rights of PWDs. He is also a Disability Inclusion Facilitator with Light for the World and serves as a board member of the National Union of Persons with Disabilities Uganda (NUDIPU). Robert is also a board member of the Uganda National Association of the Deaf and a male Councillor for people with disabilities at the local council three (LC3) level in Busukuma division, Wakiso district.

== Personal life ==
Robert loves watching and playing football and socialising with friends during his free time.

== See also ==
- List of members of the twelfth Parliament of Uganda
- Helen Nakimuli
- Nayiga Florence Sssekabira
- Disability in Uganda
- Acan Joyce Okeny
