= Nakivubo Channel =

Main stormwater drainage channel in Kampala, Uganda

Details
- Location: Kampala, Uganda
- Opened: 20th century
- Length: 9 km (5.6 mi)
- North end: Makerere Kivulu / Bat Valley, Kampala
- South end: Nakivubo wetland area towards Lake Victoria
- Owner: Kampala Capital City Authority (KCCA)
- Operator: Hamis Kiggundu and KCCA Directorate of Engineering and Technical Services

Nakivubo Channel is the primary stormwater drainage system and waterway in Kampala, the capital city of Uganda. Extending approximately nine kilometres through the central urban area, the channel carries runoff from most of the city’s developed hills and commercial zones before discharging toward Lake Victoria. It receives water from several smaller side-channel inlets, including the Jugula drainage line, Lugogo Channel. Over several decades, Nakivubo Channel has become one of Kampala’s most critical yet contested pieces of urban infrastructure, associated with chronic flooding, solid waste and silt accumulation, environmental degradation and redevelopment debates.

The channel’s condition attracted increased scrutiny in 2024, following the introduction of proposals to structurally upgrade and cover significant sections of the waterway, partly in response to CAF recommendations regarding the surrounding environment of the redeveloped Hamz Nakivubo Stadium for Uganda’s preparation to host AFCON 2027. In April 2025, the Kampala Capital City Authority (KCCA) Council passed a resolution supporting the involvement of qualified local investors in redeveloping and covering key open drainage channels under technical supervision. Later that year, businessman Hamis Kiggundu, through KIHAM Enterprises (U) Ltd, advanced a proposal to widen, clean, reinforce and cover the Nakivubo Channel as part of a privately funded redevelopment project. The initiative received further momentum after a presidential directive issued in August 2025, which instructed the relevant government agencies to facilitate the planned works.

The redevelopment concept involves enclosing the open channel within a reinforced underground system to improve stormwater flow and reduce solid-waste blockage, as well as enhancing public safety and the surrounding urban environment. The proposal also includes the construction of multi-storey commercial buildings above covered sections of the channel as a mechanism for recovering project costs. As of 2025, the project remains under phased implementation and continues to be a subject of public, technical and environmental scrutiny.

== History and Description ==
The Nakivubo drainage line was originally engineered to channel stormwater from the high-density central region of Kampala, including Makerere Kivulu, Bat Valley, Nakasero, Owino Market and the industrial area. Rapid urbanisation, reduced wetland coverage and insufficient maintenance contributed to its deterioration. By the 2000s and 2010s, the channel had become heavily silted, structurally damaged in parts and widely used as a dumping site for solid waste, contributing to recurrent flooding in downtown areas such as Kikuubo, Clock Tower and Nakivubo Trading Centre.

The surrounding Nakivubo wetland, once an ecological buffer filtering wastewater before reaching Lake Victoria, has significantly shrunk due to encroachment and commercial development, limiting its natural flood absorption and purification functions.

== Flooding and Urban Challenges ==
Kampala experiences recurrent flooding, particularly during periods of intense rainfall. Blocked inlets, undersized culverts, illegal dumping and encroachment have repeatedly been cited in government and World Bank assessments as major contributors to drainage failures. Major floods in 2019, 2023 and 2025 caused extensive damage to businesses and public infrastructure, reinforcing public debate over the adequacy of the city’s stormwater systems.

The channel has also been associated with public health risks, including contamination from plastics, faecal matter and industrial waste. Its open nature has raised security concerns, with reports of the channel being used as a hiding place for petty criminals.

== Stadium Redevelopment and Renewed Attention (2024–2025) ==
The redevelopment of Nakivubo War Memorial Stadium in 2024 brought renewed scrutiny to the condition of the channel. Inspections by the Confederation of African Football (CAF), FUFA and FIFA ahead of preparations for the CAF 2027 found the upgraded stadium structurally suitable for hosting matches, but identified major deficiencies in the surrounding environment, including exposed drainage channels, waste accumulation, and unsafe access routes.

Following these findings, drainage clearance and desilting works were initiated around the stadium area, improving water flow in the short term. The condition of the channel was subsequently identified as a key issue in Uganda’s preparations for co-hosting the 2027 Africa Cup of Nations.

== Proposed Redevelopment Projects ==
In early 2025, proposals emerged to cover, widen and upgrade portions of the channel through public–private collaboration. These proposals aimed to convert the open trench into a reinforced underground conduit and to construct commercial buildings or public spaces above the covered sections. Supporters argued that such a project would help address flooding, improve safety and enhance the appearance of the surrounding urban landscape. Critics expressed concern about ecological impacts, governance procedures and the long-term management of a major public drainage asset.

In July 2025, businessman Dr. Hamis Kiggundu submitted a formal proposal to President Yoweri Museveni outlining a plan to clean, widen, cover and redevelop the channel using private capital. The proposal described the open channel as a major source of flooding, waste accumulation and public health risks, and suggested that commercial development above the reinforced slab would enable cost recovery.

On 2 August 2025, President Museveni issued a directive endorsing the proposal and instructing the Prime Minister and relevant ministries to provide support for its implementation. The directive authorised the redevelopment to proceed and led to the beginning of preliminary works, including site clearance and drainage cleaning, in mid-August 2025 under government supervision.

Debates over the legality, oversight and technical design of proposed upgrades drew in Kampala Capital City Authority (KCCA), the Ministry for Kampala, Parliament, environmental authorities and State House.

== Government and Regulatory Actions ==
In April 2025, KCCA Council passed a resolution allowing qualified private investors to redevelop and cover key open drainage channels under the supervision of the Authority. Later in 2025, the National Environment Management Authority (NEMA) issued an Environmental and Social Impact Assessment (ESIA) approval for one of the proposed redevelopments, subject to mitigation measures.

Parliamentary committees, including the Committee on Physical Infrastructure, conducted oversight visits to assess works along the channel. Reports from these visits highlighted both engineering improvements and the need for careful regulatory compliance.

== October 2025 Flooding ==
A major rain event on 31 October 2025 triggered widespread flooding across central Kampala, affecting arcades, shops and transport routes. The incident intensified public debate about the channel’s condition and the adequacy of ongoing redevelopment works. Government assessments pointed to blocked culverts and upstream inlets as contributing factors. The event reinforced calls for comprehensive drainage upgrades across the city, not limited to Nakivubo alone.

== Environmental Concerns ==
Nakivubo Channel forms part of a larger wetland system historically responsible for filtering urban runoff before it reaches Lake Victoria. Environmentalists and civil society organisations have warned that fully enclosing or altering the channel without parallel improvements in waste management and wetland protection may reduce ecological resilience. Concerns include loss of residual wetland functions, increased pressure on engineered drainage systems, cumulative environmental impacts of commercial development, long-term maintenance obligations. NEMA’s ESIA approval mandated mitigation measures to address these issues.

== Current Status ==
By late 2025, the Nakivubo Channel remained under phased redevelopment. Sections had been cleared, widened or structurally reinforced, and proposals for covering and building over parts of the channel had received planning and environmental approvals. Work continued under the oversight of KCCA, the Ministry for Kampala and national environmental authorities.

The channel remained both a functional drainage corridor and a focal point of broader discussions on urban planning, climate resilience, public–private partnerships and the future of Kampala’s stormwater infrastructure.

As of March 2026, the Nakivubo Channel redevelopment had progressed into a covered and expanded urban drainage and business corridor within Kampala’s central business district. Reports described the original six-metre drainage corridor as having been widened into a reinforced dual-lane twelve-metre system designed to improve stormwater flow and reduce flooding during heavy rainfall. The redevelopment incorporated reinforced concrete structures, inspection access points, silt traps and covered drainage sections, while multi-level commercial buildings were constructed above parts of the corridor as part of a phased urban redevelopment programme coordinated with the Kampala Capital City Authority and other government agencies.Construction works remained ongoing in several sections of the corridor.
