= National Information Technology Authority-Uganda =

Ugandan government parastatal under the Ministry of ICT and National Guidance

National Information Technology Authority - Uganda
- Type: Parastatal
- Industry: Information Technology
- Founded: 2011
- Headquarters: Kampala, Uganda
- Key people: Hon. James Kyewalabye Kabajo; Board Chairman; Dr. Hatwib Mugasa; Executive Director
- Website: Homepage

The National Information and Technology Authority - Uganda (NITA-U) is an autonomous government parastatal under the Ministry of ICT and National Guidance in Uganda, mandated to coordinate, promote and monitor Information and Technology developments in Uganda within the context of National Social and Economic development.

== Location ==
The headquarters of NITA-U are located on Lugogo Rotary Avenue in Kampala district. The coordinates are Latitude:0.3331848; Longitude:32.5994181.

== Overview ==
The National Information Technology Authority - Uganda was initiated under the NITA- U Act, in 2009. It is generally overseen by the Ministry of ICT and National Guidance. The Authority provides technical support and expert guidance to critical Government Information Technology systems in some of the following ways:

1. Manages resource utilization for centralized data center facilities for large systems.
2. Advice on the establishment of e-Government, e-Commerce & other e-Transactions in Uganda, as well as regulate the electronic signature infrastructure.
3. Set and enforce standards on the planning, acquisition, implementation and security of information technology equipment, software and services.
4. Cater for information management through acting as a records management facility and an information repository.
5. Promote access to and utilization of information technology by special interest groups.

== Administration ==
The Authority constitutes the following key people and the respective directorates they head;

- Dr. Hatwib Mugasa, The Executive Director
- Collin Babirukamu, Directorate of e-Government Services
- Vivian Ddambya, Directorate of Technical Services
- Arnold Mangeni, Directorate of Information Security
- Stella Alibateese, National Director, Data Protection Office
- Caroline Mugisha, Director, Regulation and Legal Services
- Regina Kimera, Directorate of Finance and Administration
- Richard Obita, Directorate of Planning, Research and Development

== Ongoing Projects ==
=== National Backbone Infrastructure/E-Government Infrastructure (NBI/EGI) ===
The NBI/EGI Project is Composed to two (2) Components;

- National Data Transmission Backbone Infrastructure (NBI).
- E-Government Infrastructure (EGI).

The major aims of the Project are;

- Connect all major towns with high-speed Optical Fiber Cable based Network through the NBI.
- Connect all Governments Institutions (MDA & Local Governments) onto an e-Government Network.
- Connect all Special Interest Groups (Schools, Tertiary Institutions, Hospitals etc.).

== Other Key Developments ==
- E-government Policy framework and master plan developed
- E-government Regulations developed
- Over 40 IT standards have been developed/adopted and gazetted including website guidelines
- Parliament of the Republic of Uganda enacted 3 (three) laws relating to the use of electronic communication in Uganda, namely: the Electronic Transactions Act, 2011; the Electronic Signatures Act, 2011; and the Computer Misuse Act, 2011 collectively known as the “Cyber Laws”.
  In order to operationalize these Laws, regulations were developed and thereafter enacted in 2013. These include the Electronic Transactions Regulations, 2013 and the Electronic Signatures Regulations, 2013. These laws are the backbone of the legal framework for the IT sector and provide for and regulate the use of electronic communications in business and in the delivery of services to the public.
- National Information Security Framework (NISF) developed.
- A Framework for Certification of IT service providers, IT services and IT professionals has been developed and implemented.
- Government web portal and e-Services portal were developed and launched
- Consolidation of government software licenses.
- Set up the Information Access Centre(IAC)- a facility that provides an environment for training and innovation.
- Website development for Ministries, Departments and Agencies
