= Doreen Nyanjura =

Ugandan politician

- Born: 8 October 1989 (age 36); Fort Portal
- Citizenship: Uganda
- Education: Makerere University (Bachelor of Tourism) (Master of Arts in Public policy)
- Occupation: Politician
- Years active: 2006–present
- Known for: Politics
- Title: Deputy Lord Mayor for Kampala effective June 18th 2020 and also LCV Woman Councillor Representing Makerere University at Kampala Capital City Authority

Doreen Nyanjura is a Ugandan politician who was appointed Deputy Lord Mayor for Kampala on 18 June 2020, replacing Sarah Kanyike. She also serves as the elected Local Council 5 (LCV) Woman Councillor, representing Makerere University at Kampala Capital City Authority, the governing body of Kampala, the capital and largest city of Uganda. She was elected to her present position in 2016.

== Background and education ==
Doreen Nyanjura was born on October 8, 1989, in Fort Portal, Kabarole District, in the Western Region of Uganda. She is the third-born, in a family of seven siblings. Her parents separated when the children were still young; the children grew up with their father and visited their mother during school holidays. Her father, Samson Muhenda, a schoolteacher, served as deputy headmaster at Nyakasura School.

Nyanjura attended primary school locally. In 2003 she transferred to Kyebambe Girls' Secondary School, in Fort Portal, where she completed her O-Level studies and obtained her Uganda Certificate of Education. For her A-Level education, she attended Masheruka Girls School, at that time in Bushenyi District, but now in Sheema District. At Musheruka Girls School, she graduated with a Uganda Advanced Certificate of Education. In 2009, she was admitted to Makerere University, Uganda's largest and oldest public university, graduating with a Bachelor in Tourism, three years later. As of December 2018, she was enrolled in the postgraduate degree program of Master of Arts in Public policy, at Makerere University.

== Political career ==
Her political activism started in 2001 when she was 12 years old. She felt that presidential candidate Kiiza Besigye was not afforded a fair playing field to present and explain his manifesto. Since she was too young to vote, she asked her father to vote for Besigye.

She continued her activism in secondary school, participating in a student protest against certain school prefects and bad school food at Kyebambe Girls' School. At Masheruka Girls School, she was elected chairperson of the school council. This gave her confidence in her leadership skills and emboldened her to be more active in the opposition political party, Forum for Democratic Change (FDC).

At university, she continued her activism and mobilization for FDC. She was appointed vice president of Makerere University Guild, and organized and or participated in a number of student demonstrations on campus. Her activism drew the attention of the FDC party leaders.

In 2012, she was arrested for co-writing a book "Is It a Fundamental Change?". The book was critical of the ruling political party, National Resistance Movement. Arrested with her was the book's co-writer, Ibrahim Bagaya Kisubi. The trial fizzled, but the accused spent time on remand at Luzira Maximum Security Prison.

After her first degree, she turned down a permanent position at the Uganda National Social Security Fund and instead took up temporary research assignments with opposition politicians at parliament. In 2016, she won by a wide margin the LCV Woman Representative position at Kampala Capital City Authority. In February 2020, the FDC political party, fronted Doreen Nyanjura as the party's candidate for KCCA Speaker, a newly created elective position.
