= Kayanja =

Kayanja is an Ugandan name that may refer to

- Kayanja Muhanga (born 1965), Ugandan military officer
- Elly Kayanja (born 1959), Ugandan military officer
- Frederick Kayanja (born 1938), Ugandan physician and academic administrator
- Robert Kayanja, Ugandan pastor, author, speaker
