= Worship (style) =

Address of justices or mayors

Worship is an honorific prefix for mayors, justices of the peace, peace commissioners, and magistrates in some present or former Commonwealth realms. In spoken address, these officials are addressed as Your Worship or referred to as His Worship, Her Worship, or Their Worship (French: Son Honneur). In Australia, all states now use Your Honour as the form of address for magistrates (the same as has always been used for judges in higher courts).

== Etymology ==
The term worship implies that citizens give or attribute special worth or esteem (worthship) to their first-citizen or mayor.

== The Right Worshipful ==
The Right Worshipful (The Rt Wpful., Rt. W or RW) is an honorific style of address for all lord mayors and mayors of specific cities including the original Cinque Ports (Sandwich, Hythe, Dover, Romney and Hastings). Some historic boroughs, such as Shrewsbury and Atcham in Shropshire, also address their mayors by this prefix. In India, the mayors of cities such as Bengaluru, Mysore and Chennai are addressed as Worshipful Mayor with robes and attire as for the Lord Mayor of the City of London. The style was done away with by the Government of Kerala and the mayors in Kerala are now referred to as Respected Mayor. In Australia, the lord mayors of Darwin, Northern Territory; Parramatta, New South Wales; Newcastle, New South Wales; and Wollongong, New South Wales are also styled thus.

The style is also traditionally used for the Vice-Chancellor of the University of Cambridge. The "Right Worshipful" for is also used for certain higher-ranked Freemasonic Officials, generally those holding appointments in Grand Lodges.

== The Worshipful ==
The Worshipful is an honorific style of address for all Chancellors of Dioceses. A Chancellor's role as a judge, presiding over any consistory or ecclesiastical court, determines that the individual should be styled in this manner.

== Worshipful Master ==
In Freemasonry, Worshipful Master is the traditional style of address for the Master of a lodge, who essentially acts as the chairperson during his tenure.

== See also ==
- Excellency
- Forms of address in the United Kingdom
- Livery company (Worshipful Company of...)
- Style (manner of address)
- The Honourable
- The Right Honourable
