= Lord mayor =

Municipal executive for certain large cities in the Commonwealth

Lord mayor is a title of a mayor of what is usually a major city in a Commonwealth realm or the former British Empire, with special recognition bestowed by the sovereign of the United Kingdom. Aldermen usually elect the lord mayor from their ranks.

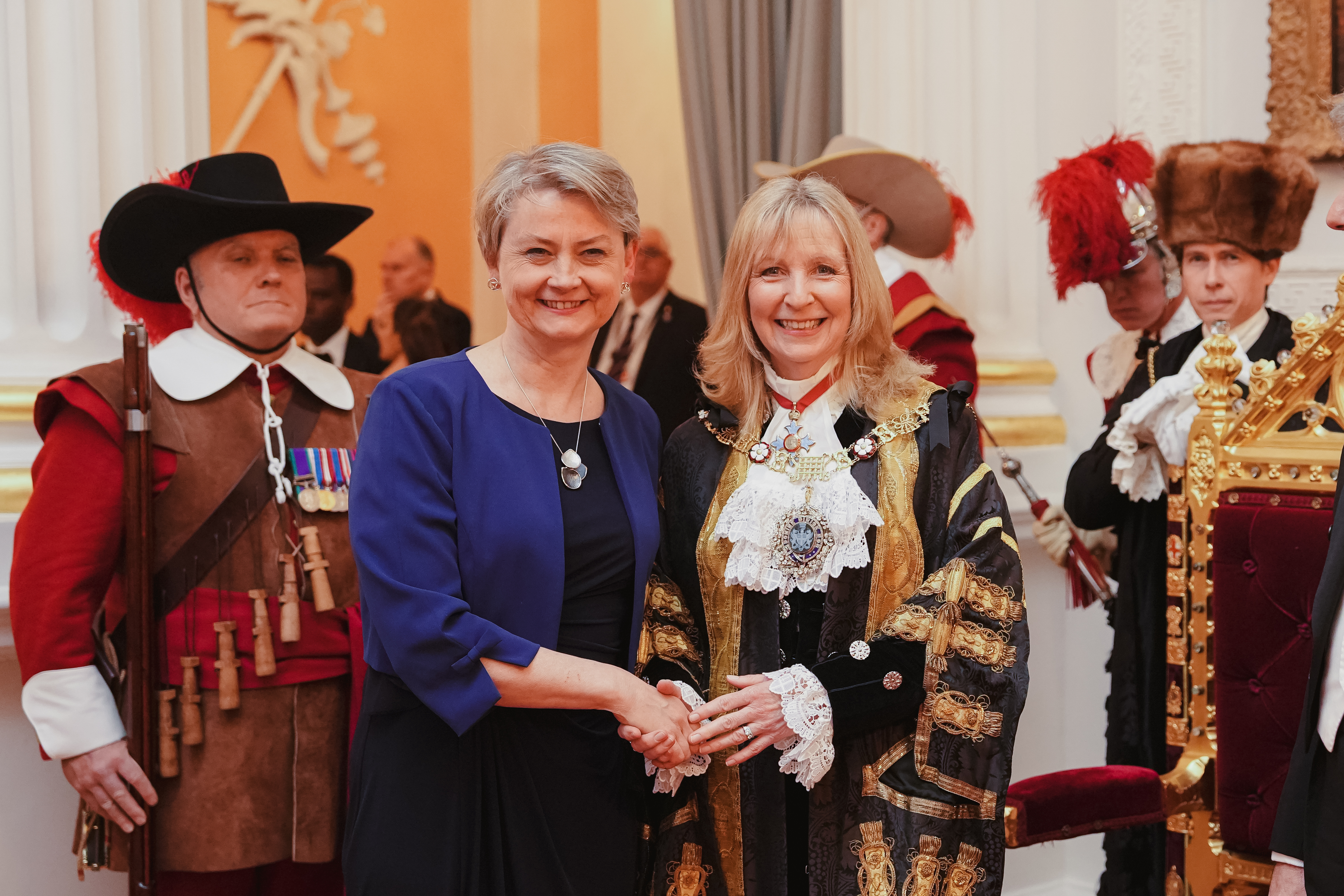
Current Lady Mayor of London, Dame Susan Langley

== Commonwealth of Nations ==
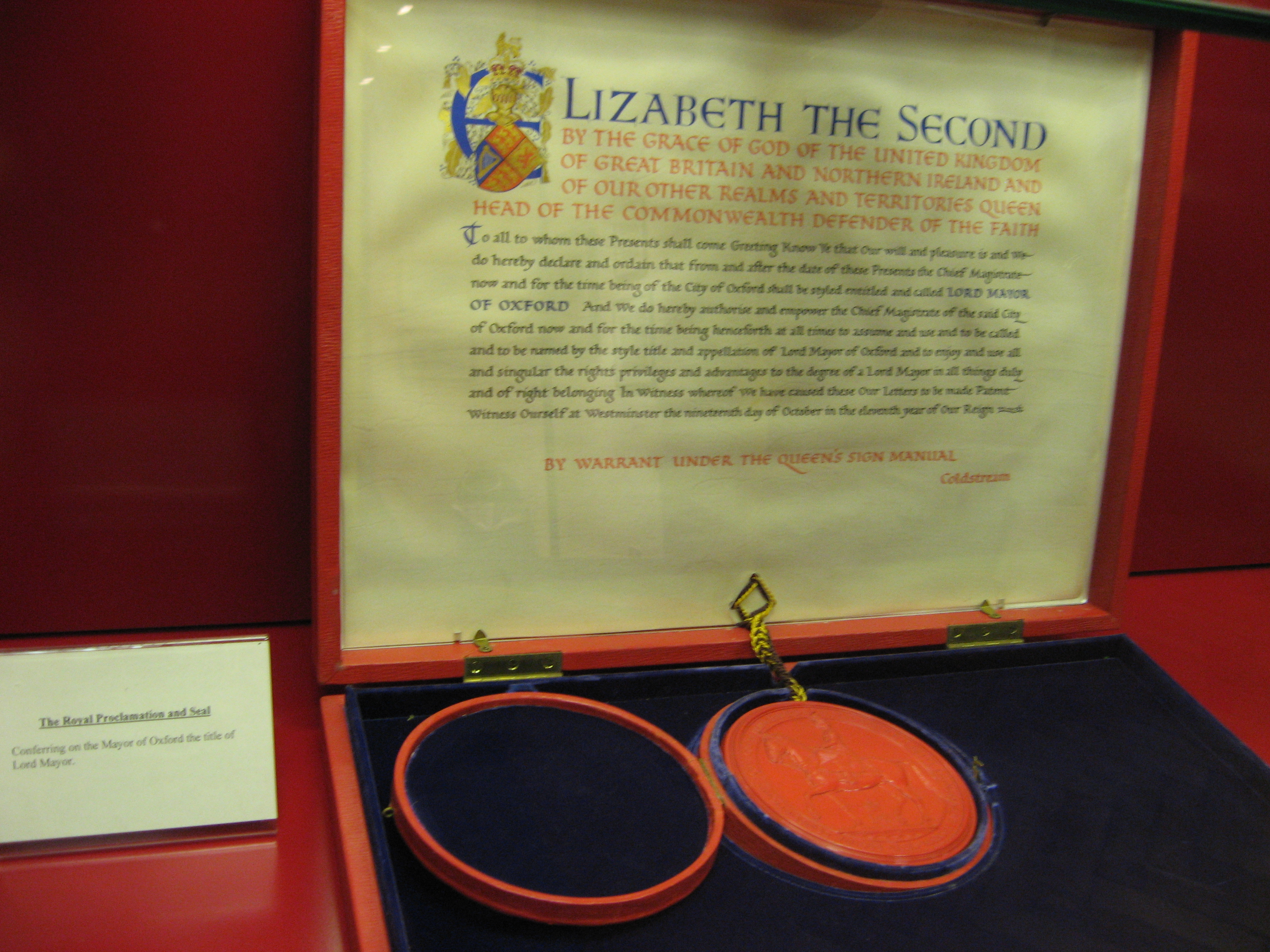
Letters patent granting lord mayoralty to Oxford

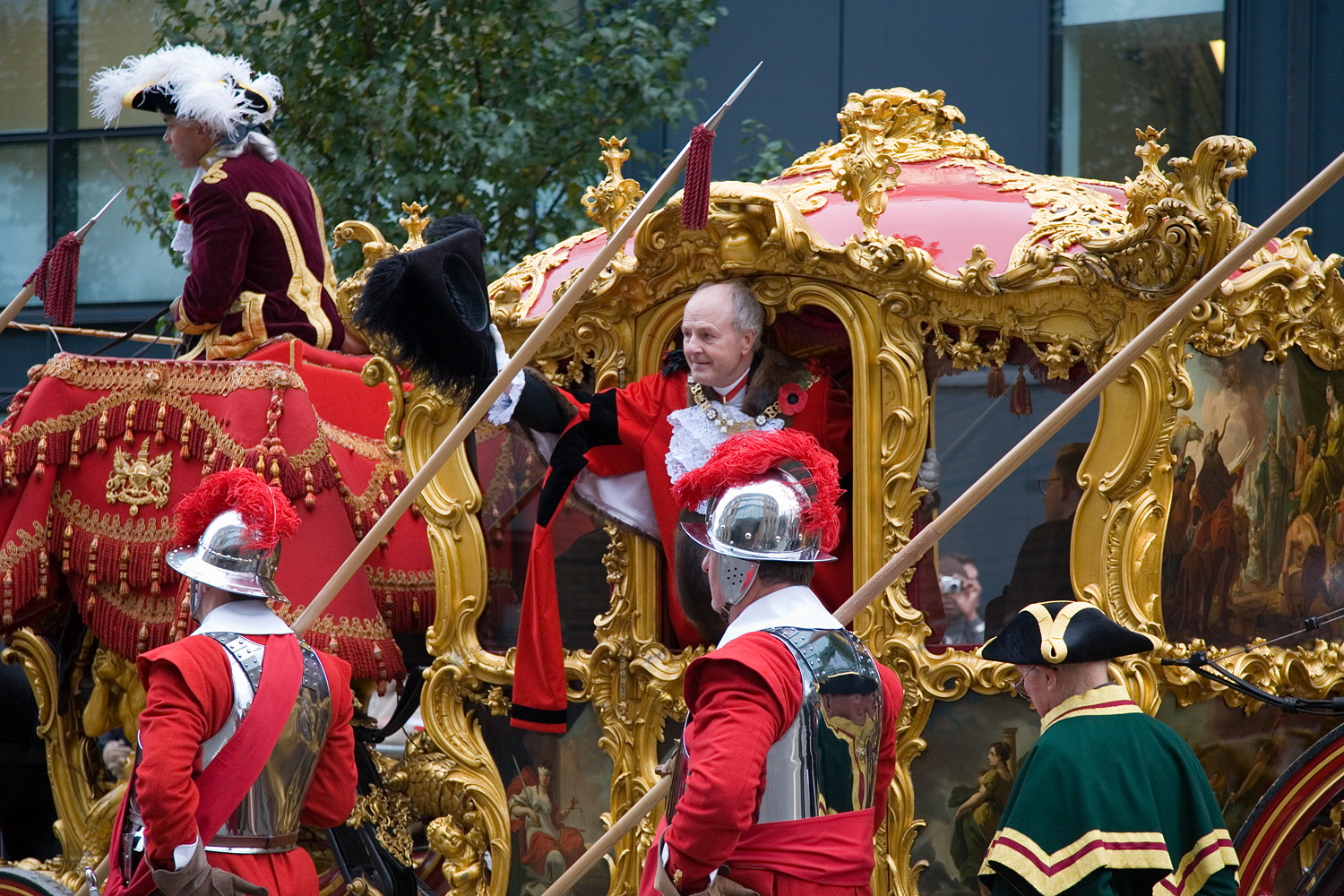
Sir John Stuttard, Lord Mayor of London during the 2006 Lord Mayor's Show

=== Australia ===
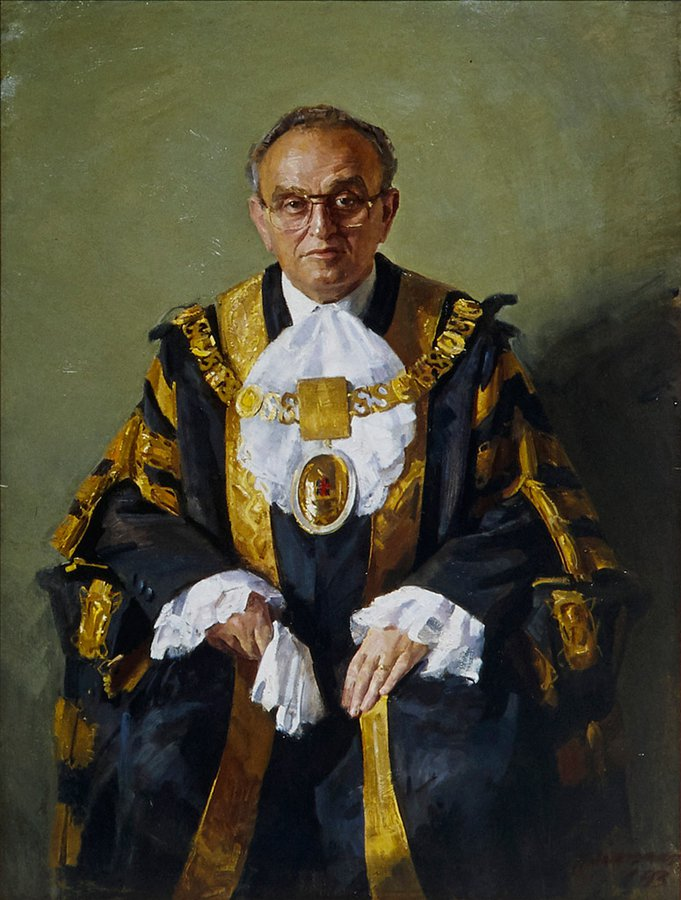
Portrait of former Lord Mayor of Adelaide, Henry Ninio (1993-1997)

In Australia, lord mayor is a special status granted by the monarch to mayors of major cities, primarily the capitals of Australian states and territories. Australian cities with lord mayors are:

- Lord Mayor of Adelaide (Since 1919)
- Lord Mayor of Brisbane (Since 1925)
- Lord Mayor of Darwin (Since 1980)
- Lord Mayor of Hobart (Since 1935)
- Lord Mayor of Melbourne (Since 1902)
- Lord Mayor of Newcastle (Since 1948)
- Lord Mayor of Parramatta (Since 1988)
- Lord Mayor of Perth (Since 1929)
- Lord Mayor of Sydney (Since 1902)
- Lord Mayor of Wollongong (Since 1970)

Lord Mayors in Australia are entitled to use the traditional honorific prefix of The Right Honourable' (which has no connection with the privy council) and the prefix attaches to the office of Lord Mayor, for example The Right Honourable the Lord Mayor of Adelaide, and is not granted to the individual, and is relinquished upon leaving office.

=== Canada ===
In Canada, the only town with a lord mayor in the traditional sense is Niagara-on-the-Lake, Ontario (originally Newark, Upper Canada), as recognition of its role as the first capital of Upper Canada. Unusually, the council of Brantford, Ontario took it upon itself to appoint an honorary Lord Mayor Walter Gretzky in addition to the elected mayor. This is the only example of a council granting the cachet itself, rather than it being granted by a higher authority, such as the Crown or national government.

=== India ===
In India, the mayors of cities such as Bengaluru, Mysore and Chennai are addressed as The Worshipful Mayor with robes and attire as for the Lord Mayor of the City of London.

=== Malaysia ===
In Malaysia, the Malay translation of lord mayor is Datuk bandar, which means "city chief". This title is used for the mayor of Kuala Lumpur, known as Datuk Bandar Kuala Lumpur locally. This position is a direct appointment by the Monarch of Malaysia.

=== United Kingdom ===
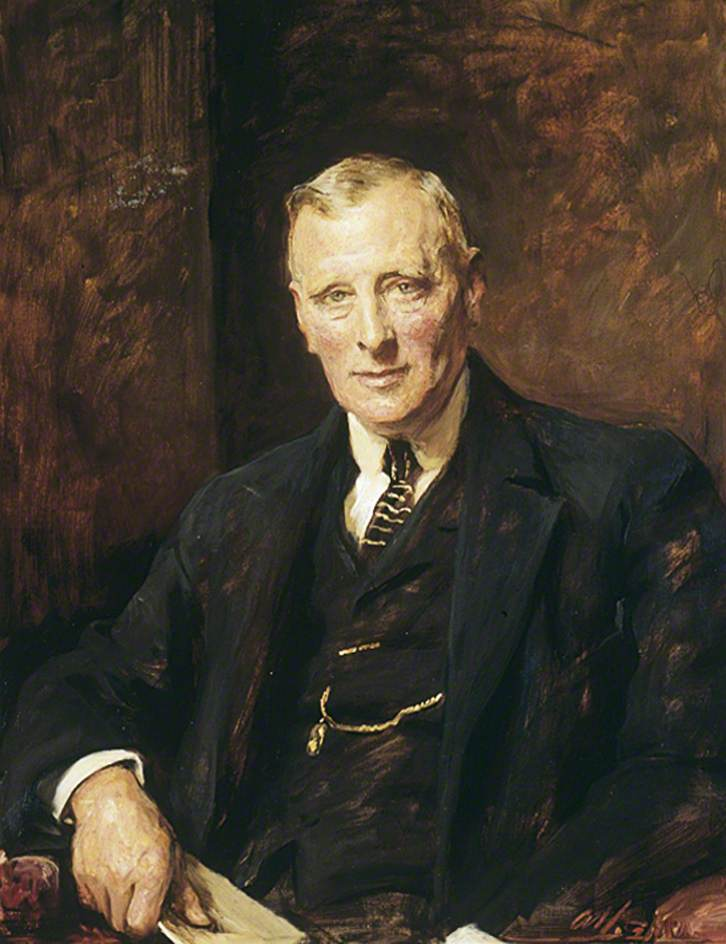
The Right Worshipful Lord Mayor of Leeds, Sir Charles Lupton

In England, Wales, and Northern Ireland, it is a ceremonial post conferred by letters patent. Most famously it refers to the Lord or Lady Mayor of London, who only has jurisdiction over the City of London, as opposed to the modern title of Mayor of London governing Greater London.
The Welsh translation of lord mayor is Arglwydd Faer.
In Scotland, the equivalent title is Lord Provost.

=== Uganda ===
In Uganda, the distinction of a lord mayoralty is exclusive to Kampala, in recognition of its preeminence as the capital.

== Ireland ==
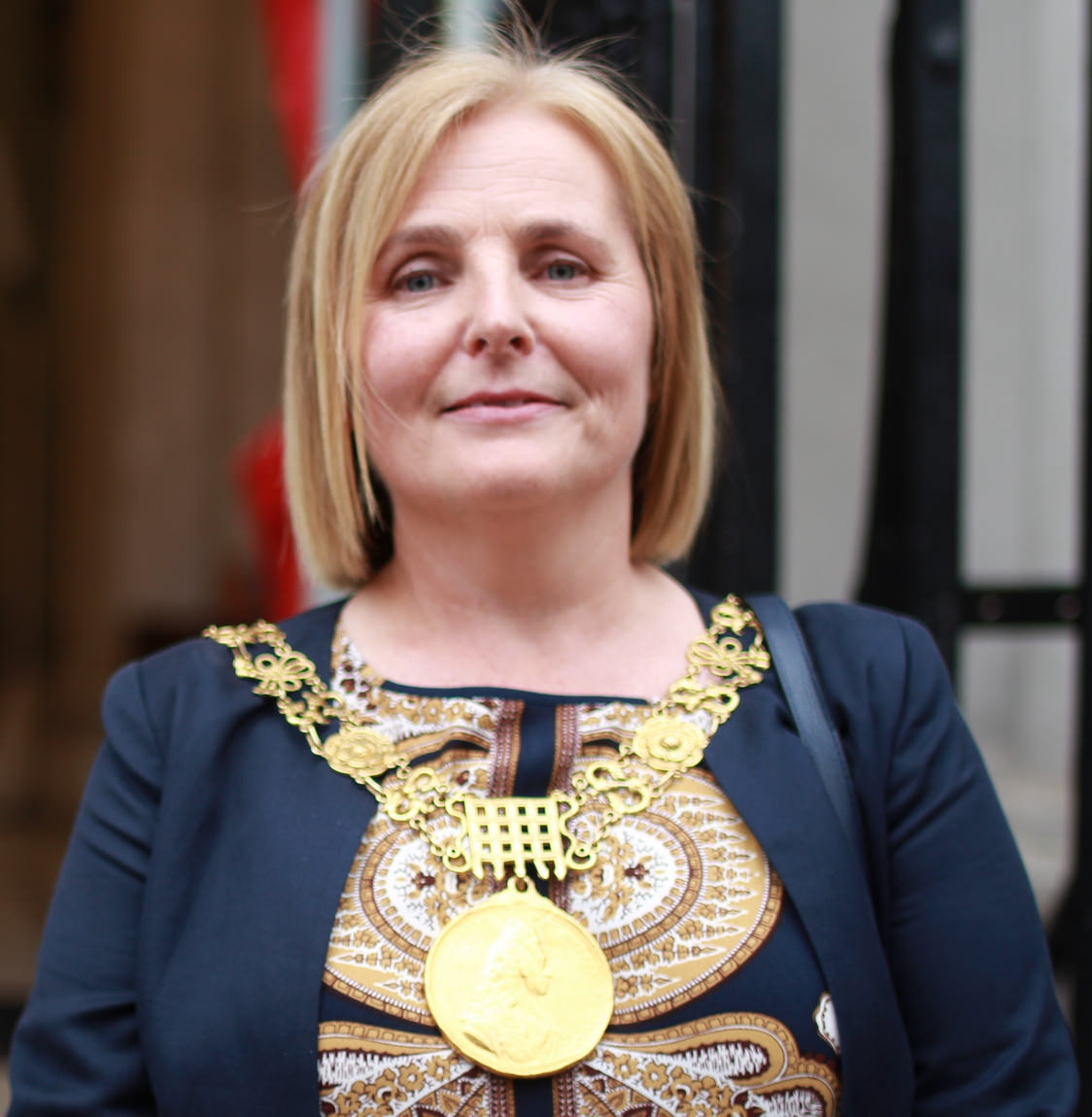
The former Lord Mayor of Dublin, Críona Ní Dhálaigh (2015-2016)

In Ireland, the posts of Lord Mayor of Dublin (granted under the Kingdom of Ireland) and Lord Mayor of Cork (granted when this city was part of the United Kingdom) still exist, and are symbolic titles as in the UK. The Irish translation of the title is Ardmhéara, literally "high mayor."

== United States ==
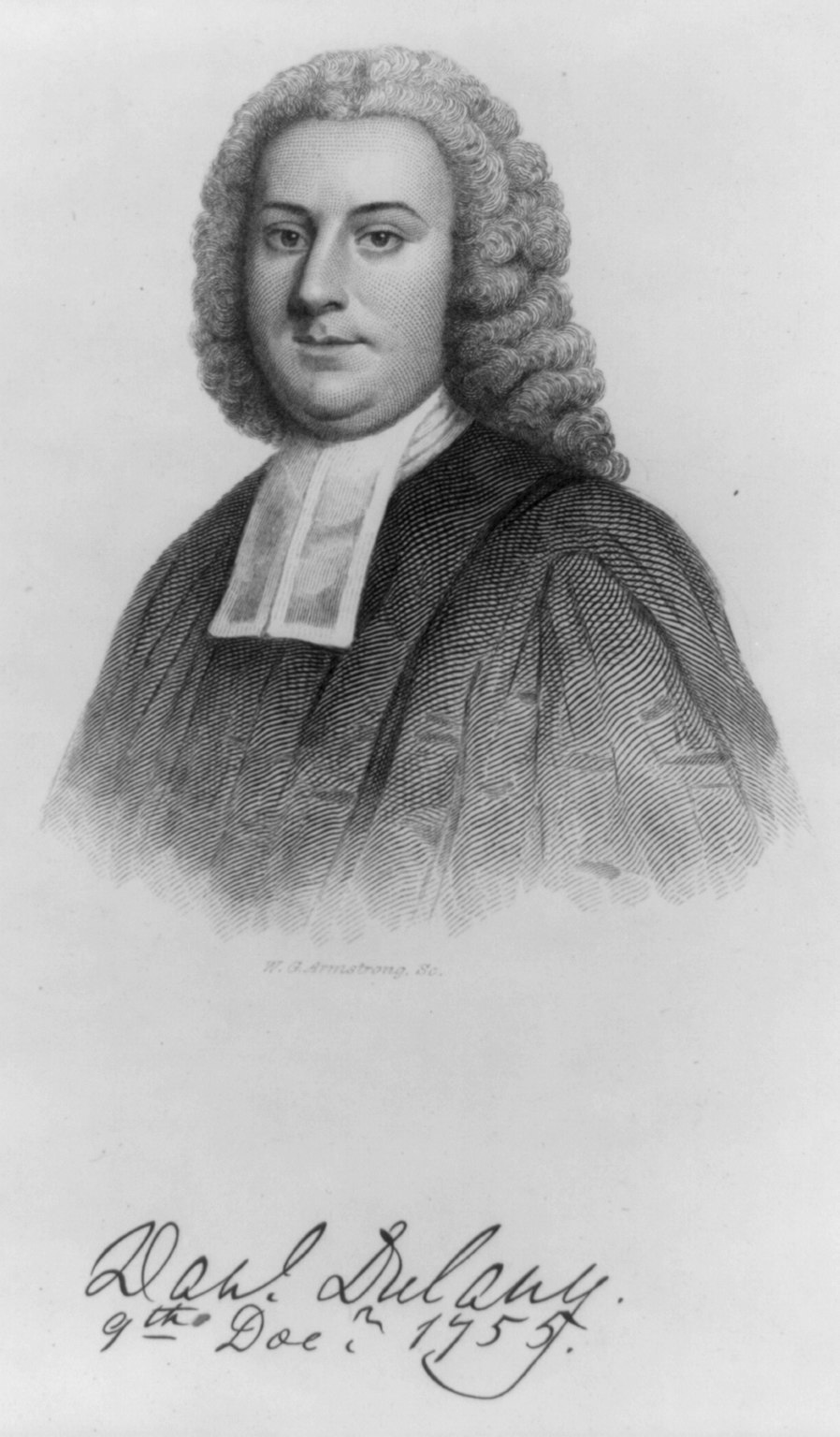
The Right Worshipful Lord Mayor of Annapolis, Daniel Dulany the Younger

In the United States, the capital of Maryland, Annapolis is incorporated under a royal charter. The city used the title of Lord Mayor of Annapolis, until shortly after the formalization of American independence from Great Britain.

== Equivalents in other languages ==
Qualified forms of mayoral titles are also present outside the English-speaking world, including forms such as "high mayor".

- In Denmark, the capital Copenhagen has six specialised mayors dealing with specific subjects (such as schools or roads), led by one overborgmester, a title commonly translated as "Lord Mayor".
- In Germany, it is sometimes (and perhaps anachronistically or incongruously) used to translate German Oberbürgermeister, the title of the mayors of large, often county-free cities. Especially in large cities that consist of subunits governed by District mayors (Bezirksbürgermeister), the title Oberbürgermeister is usually used to distinguish the head executive of the entire city from those of the subunits. As in Austria, Germany's mayors serve as the actual executive leaders of their cities and are elected officials. The post of mayor in the three German city-states is equivalent to that of a Ministerpräsident (head of government of one of Germany's constitutive states) and the respective post is referred to as Regierender Bürgermeister ("governing mayor") in Berlin and Erster Bürgermeister ("first mayor") in Hamburg. In the third city-state, Bremen, which consists of the two cities Bremen and Bremerhaven, each city has its own mayor; the Bürgermeister und Präsident des Senates (Mayor and President of the Senate) is elected by the Bürgerschaft of Bremen formed by elected representatives from both cities and serves as head of state government and mayor of Bremen.
- In Poland, the title Prezydent miasta (President of the City) is used in a corresponding fashion to the German Oberbürgermeister, as the title of the mayors of large, county-free cities. While this title has historically been translated as "Lord Mayor" in English, this usage is no longer common.
- In Finland, the head city manager of the capital, Helsinki, is customarily given by the country's President the title ylipormestari [loosely translated: "high mayor"] (which then generally is much more used of the official than kaupunginjohtaja, the title of the office itself), a tradition that resembles closely the lord mayoralties in other countries.
- In Romania and Moldova, the mayors of the capitals (Bucharest and Chişinău, respectively) are named Primar General which means general mayor. The name is ceremonial and it has no higher powers than mayors of other cities.
- In Hungary, the mayor of the capital Budapest is called főpolgármester which means chief mayor or grand mayor. Only the capital has a főpolgármester. Between 1873 and 1945, the Lord Mayor of Budapest was representative of the Hungarian government at the capital's municipal authority.
- In ancient China, jīng zhào yĭn (京兆尹) was the title given to the mayor of capital city, jīng zhào (京兆). Today, on the other hand, city mayor and party-appointed secretary (actual leader) of the four direct-controlled municipalities, Beijing, Tianjin, Shanghai, and Chongqing, though without special titles, share the rank of provincial governor and party-appointed secretary.
- In Estonia, the mayor of the capital (Tallinn), was named Lord Mayor (Ülemlinnapea) from 1938 to 1940.
- In the Czech Republic, the mayor of the capital Prague and so-called statutory cities (listed in law, currently 25 cities) is called Primátor.
- In Sweden, the titles of mayor and lord mayor have no direct equivalent since the 1970s. The executive leader of Swedish municipalities is one of sometimes several Kommunalråd in the function of the chair of the municipal board. In the capital Stockholm the chief executive is traditionally called Finansborgarråd (City Councillor of Finance)—"council" in this context referring to the executive rather than the legislative branch of local government.
- In the Ethiopian Empire, the Mayor of Addis Ababa was known as Lord Mayor (Kantiba).

== Style of address ==
The style of address for the office of the lord mayors of Belfast, Cardiff, Bristol, the City of London, York, and in Australia, is The Right Honourable. All other lord mayors are The Right Worshipful. This refers only to the post, rather than the person. The title Sir can be used for salutations when a lord mayor is being addressed.

== See also ==
- Lord provost, the similar post in Scotland
