= Kampala Capital City Authority =

Local government unit in Uganda

Coordinates: 00°18′54″N 32°35′09″E

- KCCA

Agency overview
- Formed: 2011; 15 years ago
- Jurisdiction: Government of Uganda
- Headquarters: Kampala, Uganda
- Employees: 1,133 (2018)
- Agency executives: Lord Mayor, Erias Lukwago; Executive director, HAJJAT SHARIFAH BUZEKI
- Parent agency: Ministry of Kampala Capital City Authority Affairs
- Website: kcca.go.ug

Kampala Capital City Authority (KCCA) is the legal entity, established by the Ugandan Parliament, that is responsible for the operations of the capital city of Kampala in Uganda. It replaced the Kampala City Council (KCC).

== Location ==
The headquarters of KCCA are located on Nakasero Hill in the central business district of Kampala. The headquarters are immediately south-west of the Uganda Parliament Building. The main entrance to the KCCA Complex is located on Kimathi Avenue, which comes off of Parliament Avenue. The coordinates of this building are 0° 18' 54.00"N, 32° 35' 9.00"E (Latitude:0.315000; Longitude:32.585832).

== Overview ==
The affairs of the capital city of Kampala were brought under the direct supervision of the central Ugandan government. The city clerk, formerly the highest financial officer in the city, was replaced by the executive director, who is answerable to the Minister of Kampala Capital City Authority, currently Hajat Minsa Kabanda. The elected mayor became the lord mayor, now a largely ceremonial position. In addition to the politically elected councilors, the expanded KCCA Council has members from the following professional bodies as full voting members: Uganda Institute of Professional Engineers, Uganda Society of Architects, Uganda Medical and Dental Practitioners Council, and Uganda Law Society.

== Current leaders ==
As of December 2024, the key officials responsible for KCCA affairs were:

1. Hajjat Minsa Kabanda, Cabinet Minister of KCCA, since 3 August 2021
2. Kabuye Kyofatogabye, Minister of State for KCCA, since 3 August 2021
3. Erias Lukwago, the Lord Mayor of Kampala since 2011
4. Doreen Nyanjura, Deputy Lord Mayor, since June 2021
5. Zahrah Maala Luyirika, Speaker of Kampala Capital City Authority, since June 2021
6. Frank Rusa, interim executive director of KCCA, since August 2024

== Administrative divisions ==
Kampala is divided into five divisions, each headed by a popularly elected mayor. Those divisions are preserved under the new KCCA Law. It is not yet clear what the roles of those five mayors will be in relation to the Lord Mayor and the KCCA Executive Director. The table below gives the names of the mayors:

KCCA management structure
Office	Name of official	Title of officer
Mayor	Kasirye Nganda Ali	Mayor of Makindye Division
Mayor	Salim Uhuru	Mayor of Kampala Central Division
Mayor	Paul Mugambe	Mayor of Nakawa Division
Mayor	Emmanuel Serunjoji	Mayor of Kawempe Division
Mayor	Mberaze Mawula Zacchy	Mayor of Lubaga Division

== Staff ==
As of February 2019, KCCA employed 1,113 staff, of whom 391 were permanent employees appointed by the public service commission.

== Recent developments ==
In February 2015, Rift Valley Railways, in collaboration with KCCA, began testing commuter passenger railway service in Kampala and its suburbs, with a view to establish regular scheduled service beginning in March 2015. Uganda and China have signed a memorandum of understanding to establish an elevated 35 kilometres (22 mi) light rail network. KCCA recently went under municipal finance reform and through the implementation of more efficient digitalised systems, attracting higher capacity staff, and a focus on the ‘citizen as a client’, KCCA has managed to increase own-source revenues three-fold from UGX 30 billion (US$8.2 million) in 2010/11 to UGX 90 billion (US$25 million) in 2018/19.

== See also ==
- Kampala District
- Kampala Capital City Authority FC
