= Amanda Ngabirano =

Ugandan urban planner and academic

- Born: c. 1978 (age 47–48); Uganda
- Education: Makerere University; University of Greenwich; Saxion University of Applied Sciences
- Occupations: Urban planner; academic
- Years active: 2002–present
- Known for: Academics and research
- Title: Lecturer in Urban Planning at Makerere University

Amanda Aziidah Ngabirano is a Ugandan urban planner and academic, who is a lecturer and researcher in the Department of Architecture & Physical Planning in the College of Engineering, Design, Art and Technology at Makerere University.

She is also a promoter of bicycle transport in urban areas, touting that mode of transportation to "reduce noise and air pollution, lower transport costs, decongest urban centres, create more green spaces and achieve more inclusive mobility".

== Background and education ==
Ngabirano was born in Kasese Town, in the Western Region of Uganda in the 1970s. She attended Mubuku Primary School and Hima Primary School before joining Kigezi High School, a mixed, boarding high school in Kabale City, approximately 140 miles (225 km), from home.

After high school, she missed the government scholarship scheme and was unable to enter university because her parents could not afford the fees. She spent the next three years at a vocational school in Mbarara City, studying Swahili. The teachers' college where she studied, Kakoba National Teacher’s College, is now a component of Bishop Stuart University, a private Christian university.

In her final year at Kakoba, she registered for the university entrance examinations again. She sat the A-Level examinations at St. Leo's College, Kyegobe, a Catholic, all-boys, boarding school in Fort Portal City. She passed and was admitted to Makerere University on government scholarship, to study urban planning, her only selection on the application. In 2002, she entered Makerere University, graduating three years later with a Bachelor of Urban Planning degree.

Later, she studied at the University of Greenwich in the United Kingdom and at Saxion University of Applied Sciences at the campus in Deventer, approximately 110 kilometres (68 mi) by road east of Amsterdam. She graduated with a Master of Urban, Community and Regional Planning. As of October 2021, Ngabirano is pursuing a Doctorate degree in urban and regional planning through Saxion University of Applied Sciences.

== Career ==
While an undergraduate at Makerere, Ngabirano anchored the news in Kiswahili on Uganda Television (UTV) twice a week. She began lecturing at Makerere in 2006 on a part-time basis. She was appointed a full-time lecturer in 2010.

While pursuing her master's degree in Europe, she bought a bicycle and began cycling back and forth between her off-campus residence and the university. For the thesis of her master's degree, she selected "Integrating Bicycle Transport in City Planning: A Case Study of Kampala City". She carried out her research by interviewing bicyclists on the streets of Kampala.

An idea that she developed, which her supervisor at university thought was impractical, was accepted by the Kampala Capital City Authority. A major road in the city was reserved for pedestrians, wheelchairs and bicyclist, blocking out motorized transport. The road is called Namirembe Road.

== Academic research ==
Some of Ngabirano's work includes (1) Transforming urban planning processes and outcomes through creative methods. (2) Inclusive climate resilient transport challenges in Africa.

== Other work ==
In December 2021, she was appointed the chairperson of the National Physical Planning Board- Uganda She had occupied the position in an acting capacity from 4 July 2020.

She previously served as the vice president of the World Cycling Alliance. She is a member of the consultative forum to unite Ugandan taxi operators under a single organization. She is the African partner for Move Mobility, an organization based in Deventer, Netherlands. She is a member of Collaboration for Active Mobility in Africa (CAMA). She is the Ugandan coordinator for High Volume Transport Applied Research Programme.

== Personal life ==
She is a married mother of two children.

== See also ==
- Jennifer Musisi
- Judith Tukahirwa
- Gorretti Byomire
