= Samuel Sserunkuuma =

Ugandan public administrator

Samuel Serunkuuma
- Born: Uganda
- Citizenship: Uganda
- Occupation: Public Administrator
- Years active: 2011–present
- Title: Acting Deputy Executive Director of Kampala Capital City Authority.

Samuel Sserunkuuma (also Samuel Serunkuuma) is a Ugandan public administrator, who serves as the Acting Deputy Executive Director of Kampala Capital City Authority, since 2017, following the resignation of the substantive deputy executive director, Dr. Judith Tukahirwa Tumusiime, in 2016.

== Background ==
At the time of his appointment to his current assignment, Sserunkuuma was the director of revenue collection at KCCA. In May 2018, he relinquished that role to Fred Andema, his former deputy in the Directorate of Revenue Collection at KCCA.

== As Acting Deputy Executive Director of KCCA ==
In his current assignment, he deputized Jennifer Musisi, the first executive director of KCCA, who resigned on 15 December 2018. Following the appointment of Andrew Kitaka to replace Musisi, in an acting capacity, Sserunkuuma continues to deputize Kitaka, albeit in an acting capacity.

== Succession table ==
Military offices
Preceded by Judith Tukahirwa Tumusiime; As Deputy Executive Director of Kampala Capital City Authority	Acting Deputy Executive Director of Kampala Capital City Authority; 2017 - present	Succeeded by As Deputy Executive Director of Kampala Capital City Authority
