= Andrew Kitaka =

21st-century Ugandan engineer

- Born: Buganda Region, Uganda
- Citizenship: Uganda
- Education: Namilyango College; Makerere University (Bachelor of Science in Civil Engineering); Delft University of Technology (Master of Science in Transport & Planning)
- Occupations: Civil engineer & public administrator
- Years active: 2010 – present
- Title: Director of Engineering and Technical Services at Kampala Capital City Authority
- Spouse: (Dr. Sabrina Kitaka)
- Family: 5 children

Andrew Kitaka (also, Andrew Kitaka Mubiru), is a Ugandan civil engineer and public administrator, who served as the Director of Engineering and Technical Services at Kampala Capital City Authority, a position he has held since the formation of KCCA in 2011.

In addition to that assignment, from 18 December 2018, until 12 June 2020, he concurrently served as the executive director of Kampala Capital City Authority (KCCA), in acting capacity.

== Background and education ==
Kitaka was born in the Buganda Region of Uganda, in the 1970s. After his primary education, he enrolled into King's College Budo, in Wakiso District, where he completed his O-Level studies. He then transferred to Namilyango College, in Mukono District, where he completed his A-Level education.

Kitaka was admitted to Makerere University, the oldest and largest public university in Uganda, where he graduated with a Bachelor of Science degree in civil engineering. His second degree is a Master of Science in transport and planning, awarded by Delft University of Technology, in Delft, the Netherlands.

== Career ==
Kitaka began his career at Kagga & Partners, a consulting engineering firm in Kampala. From there, he joined the Road Agency Formation Unit (RAFU), at the Uganda Ministry of Works and Transport, where he worked as a projects engineer.

Kitaka briefly served at Uganda National Roads Authority, before he was hired by the European Union, where he served as an operations officer in charge of roads infrastructure. In 2011, at the creation of Kampala Capital City Authority, Kitaka was appointed as the Director of Engineering and Technical Services in the new KCCA, a role he still occupied, as of December 2018.

Kitaka also privately consults for both local and international organisations, including the work done in June 2018 for Huron Consulting Group, of Chicago.

Kitaka is a member of the Uganda Institute of Professional Engineers (UIPE) and is a registered engineer with the Engineers Registration Board (ERB) of Uganda.

== Personal life ==
Kitaka is married to Sabrina Kitaka, a consultant pediatrician at Mulago National Referral Hospital. The couple are the parents of five children.

== See also ==
- Jennifer Musisi
- Judith Tukahirwa
