= Musisi =

Musisi is a Ugandan surname. Notable people with the surname include:

- Jennifer Musisi (born c. 1965), Ugandan lawyer and public administrator
- Majid Musisi (1965–2005), Ugandan football player
