= Abhiroop Mukhopadhyay =

Indian Economist and Statistician

- Born: 25 May 1974 (age 52); New Delhi

Academic background
- Education: Kirori Mal College; Delhi School of Economics; Delhi University; Pennsylvania State University

Academic work
- Discipline: Economics of Education, Economics of Health, Labour Economics, Empirical Development Economics
- Institutions: Indian Statistical Institute
- Website: Information at IDEAS / RePEc

Abhiroop Mukhopadhyay (born 25 May 1974) is an Indian economist and statistician who is currently a professor in the Economics and Planning Unit at the Indian Statistical Institute, New Delhi. He was previously Sir Ratan Tata Senior Fellow at the Institute of Economic Growth, an academic visitor at the India Observatory, London School of Economics, London; a visiting researcher at the Chr. Michelson Institute (Bergen), Groupement de Recherche en Economie Quantitative d'Aix Marseille, Marseille and at Charles III University of Madrid. He was also a research associate at the National Institute of Public Finance and Policy. He was awarded the Mahalanobis Medal 2018 by The Indian Econometric Society.

== Education ==
Abhiroop received his doctorate from Pennsylvania State University in 2004. He also received his master's degree in economics from the Delhi School of Economics in 1997. He completed his under graduation in economics from Kirori Mal College of the Delhi University.

== Awards ==
- Mahalanobis Memorial Medal (The Indian Econometric Society) 2018
- Honorary Research Fellow, IZA (Institute for the Study of Labour), Bonn 2012 to date
- Sir Ratan Tata Senior Fellowship, Institute of Economic Growth, Delhi 2010.
- Hermes Post Doctoral Fellowship, Fondation Maison des Sciences de l' Homme, France, 2008.
- Dissertation Fellow, The Federal Reserve Bank of Cleveland, Summer 2001.

== Published/accepted papers and chapters for books ==
- “Science education and labor market outcomes in a high STEM economy" (with Tarun Jain, Nishith Prakash and Raghav Rakesh), Forthcoming, Economic Inquiry 2021
- “Income Guarantees and Borrowing in Risky Environments. Evidence from India' Rural Employment Guarantee Scheme" (with Clive Bell), Forthcoming, Economica 2020
- "Socioeconomic inequality in life expectancy in India" an analysis of the fourth round of National Family Health Survey" (with M. Asaria, S. Mazumdar, S. Chowdhury, P. Mazumdar and I. Gupta): BMJ-Global Health, 2019;4:e001445.
- "Redistributing Teachers using Local Transfers" (with Siddhant Agarwal, Athisii Kayina and Anugula Reddy) : World Development, Volume 110 (October), pp. 333–344, 2018
- "Gender differences in health expenditure of rural cancer patients: Evidence from a public tertiary care facility in India" (with Akansha Batra and Indrani Gupta): Journal of Quantitative Economics, https://doi.org/10.1007/s40953-017-0113-4 Forthcoming 2018
- "Higher Education and Prosperity: From Catholic Missionaries to Luminosity in India" (with Amparo Castelló-Climent and Latika Chaudhry): The Economic Journal, DOI: 10.1111/ecoj.12551
- "Does Access to Secondary Education Affect Primary Schooling? Evidence from India” (with Soham Sahoo): Economics of Education Review, Volume 54, October 2016, pp 124–142
- “Female Labour Force Participation and Child Education in India: Evidence from the National Rural Employment Guarantee Scheme” (with Farzana Afridi & Soham Sahoo): IZA Journal of Labor and Development, 5:7, April 2016
- “Local Funds and Political Competition: Evidence from the National Rural Employment Guarantee Scheme in India” (with Bhanu Gupta): European Journal of Political Economy, Volume 41, January 2016, pp 14–30
- “The National Rural Employment Guarantee Scheme in Rajasthan: Rational Funds and their Allocation across villages” (with Himashu and M. Sharan): Economic and Political Weekly, Volume 50, Issue 6, February 6, 2015
- “Mass Education or a Minority Well Educated Elite in the Process of Growth: the Case of India” (with Amparo Castelló Climent): Journal of Development Economics, Volume 106, Nov 2013
- "Multiple-Dimensions of Urban Well Being: Evidence from India” (with S Chandrasekhar): Asian Population Studies, Volume 8 (2), March 2012, 173-186
- “Rural Housing Quality as an Indicator of Consumption Sustainability” (with Indira Rajaraman), Economic and Political Weekly, Vol 47, No 2 March 2012.
- “The Economic Burden of Cancer” (with B. K. Mohanti, S. Das, K. Sharma & S. Dash): Economic and Political Weekly, Vol. 43(46), 22 October 2011, pp. 112–117
- “Poverty and Well-Being in Indian Cities during the Reforms Era” (with S Chandrasekhar): Berkley Electronic Press: Poverty and Public Policy, Volume 1, Issue 2, April 2010.
- “Ranking Countries: What Can We Learn from India’s Imports?” (with S. Chandrasekhar and R. Vaidya), Journal of Quantitative Economics, Forthcoming 2009.
- “Integrating Mental Health in Welfare Evaluation: An Empirical Application to the case of HIV-AIDS in India” (With S. Das and T. Ray), The B.E. Journal of Economic Analysis & Policy: Vol. 9 : Iss. 1 (Topics), 2009, Article 41.
- “Is India better off today than 15 years ago? A Robust Multidimensional Answer” (with N. Gravel), Journal of Economic Inequality, Forthcoming 2009.
- “Economic Cost Analysis in Cancer Management and its Relevance Today” (with K. Sharma, S. Das, G. K. Rath and B. K. Mohanti), Indian Journal of Cancer, Vol 46, Issue 3, July–September 2009, pp. 184–189.
- “Economic Cost of HIV and AIDS in India,” (with S. Das and T. Roy), in Markus Haacker and Mariam Claeson, edited, HIV and AIDS in South Asia: A Development Risk, The World Bank (Washington D.C.), Feb. 2009, pp. 123–151.
- “A Robust Normative Evaluation of India’s Performance in Allocating Risks of Death” (with N. Gravel and B. Tarroux), Indian Growth and Development Review, Vol. 1, May 2008. pp. 95–111.
- “Socioeconomic Heterogeneity in Urban India”, (with S. Chandrasekhar), in George Martine, Gordon McGranahan and Mark Montgomery ed. Living in an Urban World (Earthscan), 2008.
- “Rural Unemployment 1999–2005: Who Gained, Who Lost?”, (with I. Rajaraman), Economic and Political Weekly, Vol. 42 (30) 28 July – 3 August 2007, pp. 3116–3120.
- “Does Cost of Primary Education Matter: Evidence from Rural India” (with S. Chandrasekhar), Economic and Political Weekly, September 2006.
- "Univariate Time Series Analysis of Public Debt" (with I. Rajaraman), Journal of Quantitative Economics, New Series Vol. 2 (1), 2004, pp. 122–134.
- “Trade with Labor Market Distortions and Heterogeneous Labor: Why Trade Can Hurt” (with K. Krishna and C. Yavas), WTO & World Trade: Challenges in a New Era, 2004.
- "Sustainability of Public Debt" (with I. Rajaraman), in Amaresh Bagchi ed. Readings in Public Finance (Oxford University Press), 2004.

== Refereed working papers ==
- “Local Funds and Political Competition: Evidence from the National Rural Employment Guarantee Scheme in India” (with Bhanu Gupta) ESID Working Paper No. 42 (University of Manchester), November 2014
- "The National Rural Employment Guarantee Scheme in Rajasthan: Rationed Funds and their allocation across villages" (with Himanshu and M. Sharan) ESID Working Paper No. 35 January 2015
- ”The Political Economy of National Rural Employment Guarantee Scheme“ ESID Working Paper No. 15 September 2012
- “Mass Education or a Minority Well Educated Elite in the Process of Development: the Case of India” (with Amparo Costelló Climent), CEP (London School of Economics) Discussion Paper No 1086, November 2011.
- “Female Labour Force Participation and Child Education in India: The Effect of the National Employment Guarantee Scheme” (with Farzana Afridi and Soham Sahoo), Young Lives Working Paper 95 March 2013
- “Stepping out of Palanpur: Employment outside Palanpur” Asia Research Centre Working Paper No. 46, London School of Economics, London, UK 2011.
- "Non-Farm Diversification and Rural Poverty Decline: A perspective from Indian Sample survey and village study data” (with Himanshu, Peter Lanjouw and Rinku Murgai) Asia Research Centre Working Paper No. 44, London School of Economics, London, UK 2011.
- “Multiple Dimensions of Urban Poverty: Evidence from India” (with S. Chandrasekhar) Poverty, Gender, and Youth Working Paper No. 11, Population Council, New York City, 2008
- “Quota Brokers” (with S. Imai, Kala Krishna and Ling Hui Tan), IMF Working Paper 179, September 2004.
- “Trade with Labor Market Distortions and Heterogeneous Labor: Why Trade Can Hurt” (with K. Krishna and C. Yavas) NBER Working Paper 9086, 2004

== Other working papers ==
- "Tertiary Education and Prosperity: Catholic Missionaries to Luminosity in India" (with Amparo Castelló-Climent and Latika Chaudhary): IZA Discussion Paper No. 9441, October 201
- “Income Guarantees and Borrowing in Risky Environments. Evidence from India' Rural Employment Guarantee Scheme" (with Clive Bell) IZA Discussion Paper No. 9357, September 2015
- “Does Access to Secondary Education affect Primary Schooling?: Evidence from India” (with Soham Sahoo), Institute of Economic Growth Working Paper No. 312, 2012
- “The Effects of NREGS on Rural Households in India: Evidence from Karauli District in Rajasthan”. (Paper submitted to Fondation Maison des Sciences de L’Homme, France), 2008.
- “Negative Reality of the HIV Positives: Evaluating Welfare Loss in a Low Prevalence Country”, with Sanghamitra Das and Tridip Ray, ISI Discussion Paper 08-02, Indian Statistical Institute (Delhi Centre), New Delhi, India, February 2008.
- “An Empirical Investigation Into How Middlemen Affect Markets”, with Susumu Imai and Kala Krishna, ISI Discussion Paper 05-02, Indian Statistical Institute (Delhi Centre), New Delhi, India, December 2004

Amongst other courses, Abhiroop has taught the Introductory and Advanced Econometrics and Structural Estimation Methods: Empirical Industrial Organization courses at the Indian Statistical Institute (Delhi), at the Indian School of Business (Hyderabad) and the Indian Institute of Management (Bangalore).
