= The Uses of Disorder =

1970 book by Richard Sennett

- Author: Richard Sennett
- Subject: American society
- Publisher: Knopf
- Publication date: 1970
- Pages: 198

The Uses of Disorder: Personal Identity and City Life is a 1970 book on the virtues of diversified communities written by Richard Sennett and published by Knopf. It was Sennett's first book, and is divided into two parts: the first analyzes the causes of stagnant and over-ordered communities, while the second contains Sennett's proposed solution.

== Background ==
The Uses of Disorder was published by Knopf in 1970. It is 198 pages long. At the time of publication, author Richard Sennett was a professor of sociology at Brandeis University.

== Content ==
The Uses of Disorder analyzes human development at the personal and collective level in wealthy cities, presenting the thesis that such cities are excessively ordered and thereby enable residents to avoid personal growth or change. Instead of relying on prescriptive plans and rigid self-conceptions, Sennett argues, people should remain open to difference and disorder while city life ought to be more disorderly and decentralized. The book is divided into two parts, with the first analyzing the causes of over-ordered and stagnant communities, and the second containing Sennett's proposed solution.

In the first part of the book, Sennett states that adolescents are pressured to make major decisions about their lives without sufficient life experience. Because of this, he argues, they mentally construct a simplified version of the world and base their decision on that conceptual model. When they carry out these plans in the real world, they attempt to shape reality to fit their past decisions rather than making decisions based on reality. While poor people have insufficient power to actually do this, Sennett writes that the American middle class is able to carry out these changes to the real world, and has done so by creating purified, orderly communities. In the process, they have stifled deviance and thereby eliminated the need for personal growth.

In the book's latter section, Sennett shares his solution to the problem he has described. He calls for the abolition of the purified communities, which he states is only possible in urban areas with a dense and diverse population. He additionally states that the population must be actively prevented from self-segregating into orderly communities within the urban setting, and that this can only be made possible through a radical change in the organization and structure of cities. The objective of this change would be to create urban environments where conflict and disorder are ongoing but can be expressed without violence, and where community life is engaging rather than boring or alienating. He specifically suggests creating "survival communities", in which confrontations between people at the individual level are part of the societal structure, by eliminating policing along with "any other form of central control, of schooling, zoning, renewal, or city activities that could be performed through common community action".

== Reception ==
=== In academia ===
A review in Official Architecture and Planning described The Uses of Disorder as a "Mind Expander", praising Sennett's synthesis of work by various social analysts including Erik Erikson and Alex Inkeles, and stating that the book "may have a startlingly powerful impact" on readers seeking "greater insight into increasingly polarised cities". In American Anthropologist, a reviewer characterized the book as imaginative and innovative, writing that its argument "deserves to be taken seriously as a possible solution to the mess affluent young Americans now find themselves in". The review also described the book as "similar to, but a vast improvement over" The Greening of America, and suggested that it could be useful for courses in urban anthropology. A reviewer in The American Political Science Review "found the hypothesis improbable and the solution unappealing" but noted that "Sennett's prose is both lucid and fun to read".

=== In media ===
Kenneth Keniston included The Uses of Disorder in a 1970 article in The New York Times titled "Three books that suggest a radical critique of modern America". Keniston stated that while "Sennett sets out merely to write another book about cities [...] he has ended up writing the best available contemporary defense of anarchism", and described the book as "utopian in the best sense — it tries to define a radically different future". He concluded that "with this book, the process of redefining 19th‐century anarchism for the 20th century is begun".

In 2008, The Guardian published a short review of The Uses of Disorder after a new edition was published with an added preface. Written by PD Smith, the review stated that "[Sennett's] argument remains powerful and relevant, an inspiration to a new generation of urbanists".

== Legacy ==
The Uses of Disorder was Sennett's first book. He had written 14 more as of 2018; the most recent, Building and Dwelling, revisited many of the ideas initially included in The Uses of Disorder.

== Works cited ==
- Angel, Shlomo (July 6, 2018). "'Building and Dwelling' Review: A Manifesto for the Open City". Wall Street Journal. ISSN 0099-9660.
- Blair, Thom (1971). "Review of The Uses of Disorder: Personal Identity and City Life". Official Architecture and Planning. 34 (5): 372. ISSN 2399-5327. JSTOR 43964345.
- Burch, Ernest S. (1973). "Review of The Uses of Disorder: Personal Identity and City Life". American Anthropologist. 75 (2): 546–547. doi:10.1525/aa.1973.75.2.02a01430. ISSN 0002-7294. JSTOR 672292.
- Keniston, Kenneth (September 6, 1970). "Three books that suggest a radical critique of modern America". The New York Times. pp. 3, 20. ISSN 0362-4331.
- Nexon, David (1976). "Review of The Uses of Disorder: Personal Identity and City Life". The American Political Science Review. 70 (3): 986–987. doi:10.2307/1959902. ISSN 0003-0554. JSTOR 1959902.
- Smith, PD (December 13, 2008). "Review: The Uses of Disorder by Richard Sennett". The Guardian.
