= LSE Cities =

English research centre

Coordinates: 51.5139°N 0.1156°W

LSE Cities is a research centre at the London School of Economics and Political Science.

The purpose of the centre is to increase knowledge and understanding of how people and cities interact in a rapidly urbanising world, focusing on how the physical form and design of cities impacts on society, culture and the environment; and educate and train new generations of researchers and executives through its postgraduate and executive programmes. The 13-year old Urban Age project is the centre's major outreach component. This international investigation of how the physical and social are interconnected in cities has held conferences in 13 cities across four continents, including Delhi, Rio de Janeiro, London, Hong Kong, Istanbul, São Paulo, Mumbai, Mexico City, Johannesburg, Berlin, Shanghai and New York City. In 2010 the conference, which investigated the economic health of cities post-recession, was co-hosted with Brookings Institution in Chicago. In 2016, the conference was hosted as part of the 15th International Architecture Exhibition in Venice and the forthcoming conference is expected to take place in Addis Ababa in November 2018. Urban Age is jointly organised with Deutsche Bank’s Alfred Herrhausen Gesellschaft.

The centre's main research activities are divided into three research units:

1. Cities, Space and Society
2. Cities and the Environment
3. Urban Governance

Ricky Burdett is the director of LSE Cities. Philipp Rode acts as the executive director.

== Education ==
The centre offers MSc, PhD and executive education. The MSc in City Design and Social Science is unique within the LSE as it has a practical, studio-based component. An 18-month part time Executive MSc in Cities for working professionals is also available as of 2016. Urban Age and Bloomberg Philanthropies scholarships provide financial support to applicants. The centre has offered a one-week Executive Education short course since 2014 on "London and Global Cities - Governance, Planning and Design".

== Events and exhibitions ==
LSE Cities regularly organises a range of events, including public lectures, seminars, workshops and exhibitions in London and internationally. In November and December 2015, the centre collaborated with Guardian Cities for the "Urban Age 10 Global Debates", which included five public events on issues such as social equity and designing urban infrastructure, accompanied by articles published in the Guardian. Participants included sociologist Saskia Sassen, writer Suketu Mehta, architects Norman Foster and Alejandro Aravena, as well as the executive director of UN Habitat, Joan Clos.

The centre has also co-led the organisation of several events, such as the 2015 Disrupting Mobility Summit in Cambridge, MA, along with MIT Media Lab, U.C. Berkeley’s Transportation Sustainability Research Center (TSRC) and the Berlin Social Science Centre. It also co-led a policy unit on urban governance, capacity and institutional development in preparation for the October 2016 Habitat III conference in Quito, Ecuador as well as one of three Urban Talks, which were central to the official programme.

In 2016, the Urban Age programme presented one of the three Special Projects featured at the 15th International Architecture Exhibition realised by La Biennale di Venezia. Titled Conflicts of an Urban Age, the exhibition examined global urban trends from 1990 to 2015 and asked how the world can accommodate five billion urban dwellers by 2030. In 2017, a version of the exhibition travelled to Berlin and the 2017 Seoul Biennale of Architecture and Urbanism. In Seoul, the exhibition was renamed Dynamics of the Urban Age.

== Research and key publications ==
A variety of publications have been produced by LSE Cities. The centre's Urban Age project has led to the publication of two books edited by Ricky Burdett and Deyan Sudjic: The Endless City (2008) and Living in the Endless City (2011). A third book in the series, Shaping Cities in an Urban Age, is expected in 2018. These books address the broad themes discussed at Urban Age conferences, produce data on various economic, social and environmental indicators and provide more detailed chapters on specific cities. The centre has also published several reports, such as Going Green: How cities are leading the next economy (2013), the product of a survey of 90 city governments with the Global Green Growth Institute (GGGI) and ICLEI – local governments for sustainability. Other reports have addressed issues ranging from transport and mobility, to cities and energy, including leading the cities research for the Global Commission on the Economy and Climate, and the prospects for technological innovation in urban environments. Recent reports include Towards Urban Growth Analytics for Yangon and Resource Urbanisms: Asia’s divergent city models of Kuwait, Abu Dhabi, Singapore and Hong Kong.

Several academic articles by LSE Cities researchers and directors have also been published. The Ordinary Streets project led by Suzanne Hall has produced a number ethnographic and sociological studies on diversity, migration and urban adaptation. It has also been captured in a short film looking at the inner workings of life and local business on Peckham's Rye Lane and has led to a £100,000 Philip Leverhulme Prize for the work to be extended into South Africa. The findings of the Urban Uncertainty Project, coordinated by Sobia Ahmad Kaker and Austin Zeiderman, have similarly been presented in various academic journals and reports. The Urban Governance research unit has also produced the New Urban Governance project, co-funded by the John D. and Catherine T. MacArthur Foundation, which features the urban governance survey, developed along with UN Habitat and United Cities and Local Governments (UCLG), aiming to redress the lack of empirical research on the functioning and capacity of local and city governments worldwide. The project includes a dedicated website which was shortlisted for a KANTAR Information is Beautiful Award and included in a book detailing how data visualisation will impact on scholarly, academic, cultural, social, and political spheres.

== Awards and achievements ==
The Queen's Anniversary Prize for 2016-2018 was awarded in recognition of LSE Cities’ work on ‘training, research and policy formulation for cities of the future and a new generation of urban leaders around the world.’

In the 2018 New Year Honours, Professor Richard Sennett was awarded an OBE for services to design. Sennett Chair of the advisory board at LSE Cities and contributed to founding the Urban Age.

In the 2017 New Year Honours, Professor Ricky Burdett was appointed a CBE for services to urban planning and design. Burdett is the Director of LSE Cities and the Urban Age.

Suzanne Hall, Director of the Cities Programme, won a Philip Leverhulme Prize (2017) to extend her Ordinary Streets project on how migrants inhabit the city to Cape Town, South Africa. Hall also won LSE Teaching Prize in 2017.
