= Saxion University of Applied Sciences =

University in the eastern Netherlands

- Hogeschool Saxion
- Motto: Get Ready for a Smart World
- Type: University of applied sciences
- Established: 1998
- Affiliations: UASNL, SURF; Erasmus+
- Chairperson: drs. Anka Mulder
- Administrative staff: 2.825
- Students: +27.000
- Location: Enschede, Deventer, and Apeldoorn, Netherlands
- Campus: Multiple campuses
- Colors: Saxion green
- Website: saxion.edu

Saxion University of Applied Sciences (Dutch: Hogeschool Saxion) is a Dutch university of applied sciences with three campuses in the eastern Netherlands. It provides more than 100 courses in study fields as archaeology, finance, law, engineering, hospitality, business, IT, broadcasting, health and digital media. With over 27,000 students, it is one of the largest institutions of higher education in the Netherlands. Saxion offers bachelor & master education and research focused on living technology.

The roots of Saxion University can be traced back to the 1875. A merger of two educational institutions, the Hogeschool Enschede and Hogeschool IJselland, in 1998 paved the way for Saxion University in its present form.

== History ==
Saxion is a University of Applied Sciences that originated from the rich educational history of the city of books Deventer and from the social initiatives of enterprising textile traders from Twente. Ever since the 13th century, Deventer has been a bastion of books and knowledge. In the 15th century, Desiderius Erasmus was one of the many students walking the streets of Deventer. Students came from far and near, and Latin was their lingua franca. The Deventer-based Athenaeum Illustre, founded in the 17th century, was a school for academic education. The institution can be regarded as a distant precursor of Saxion.

In the final days of the Athenaeum Illustre, the Twente Industrial and Trade School was founded in Twente in 1864. It was financed by industrialists and traders from the textiles industry. With the founding of schools for secondary technical education, such as the Hogere Textielschool De Maere, technical education in Twente was on the rise. Education in Twente was strongly rooted in society. Entrepreneurs provided financing, took care of the management, recruited lecturers and offered opportunities for internships.

In Deventer as well as in Enschede and Hengelo, the educational offerings expanded considerably after the Second World War. In the 1960s and 1970s, many new and diverse degree programmes were initiated and the number of students increased considerably. After a management merger in the Stichting Hogescholen Oost-Nederland (HON) on 1 January 1998, Enschede started developing a city campus.

In the year 2000, the teaching foundation was given a new name. Rijkshogeschool IJselland and Hogeschool Enschede continued together as Saxion. In 2001, the university of applied sciences expanded its educational activities to Apeldoorn.

== Academies ==
=== Schools ===
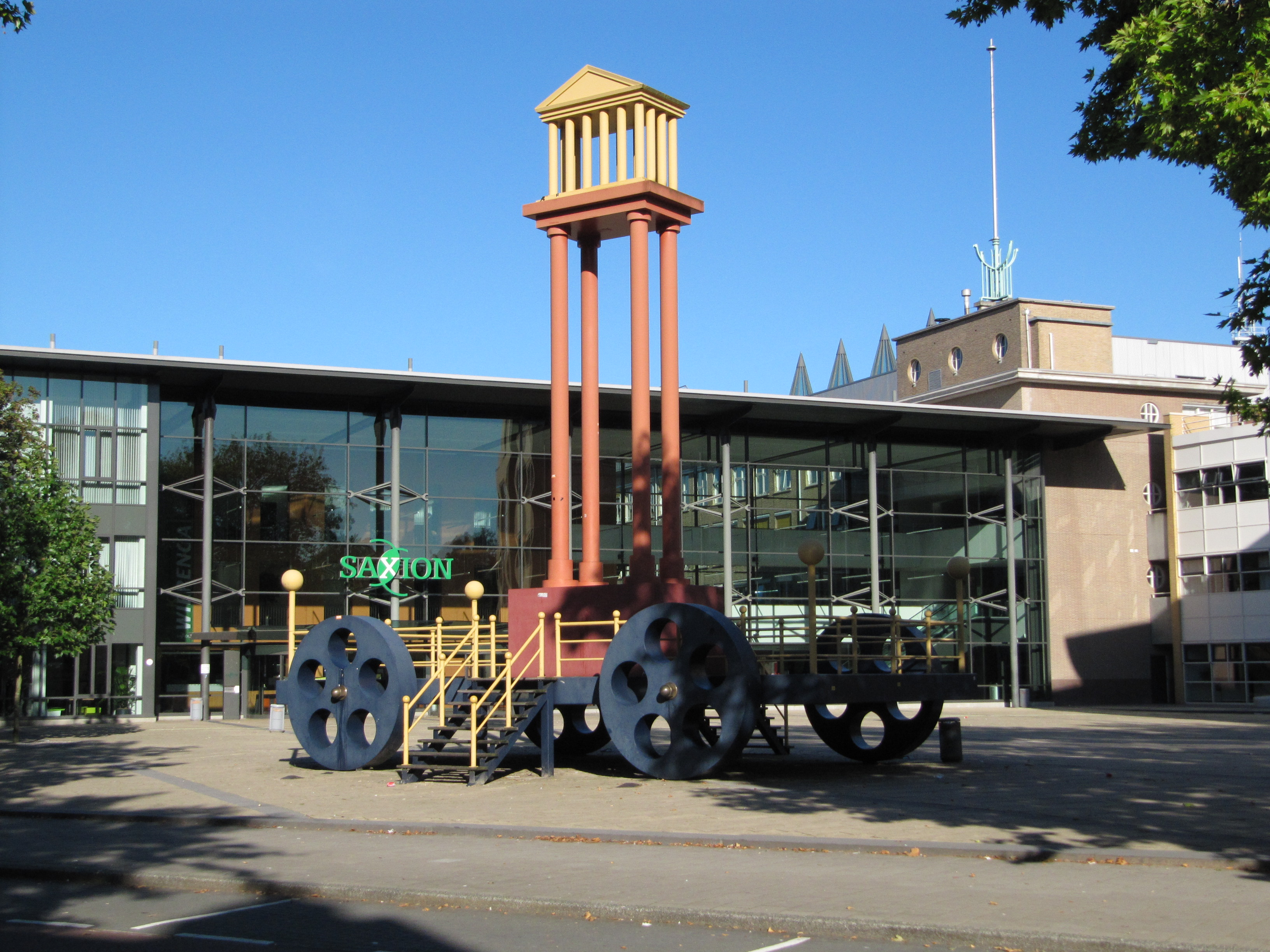
Saxion University of Applied Sciences in Enschede

Saxion University of Applied Sciences consists of eleven academies, each representing a different field of specialization and study courses.

- Hospitality Business School (HBS)
- School of Applied Psychology and Human Resources Management (AMA)
- School of Business, Building & Technology (BBT)
- School of Commerce & Entrepreneurship (SCE)
- School of Creative Technology (ACT)
- School of Education (APO)
- School of Finance & International Business (FIB)
- School of Governance, Law & Urban Development (ABRR)
- School of Health (AGZ)
- School of Life Science, Engineering & Design (LED)
- School of Social Work (AMM)
- School of Finance & Accounting (FEM)

=== Programmes ===
==== International bachelor programs ====
The international bachelor program consists of eleven study programs.

- Applied Computer Sciences
- Civil Engineering
- Creative Media and Game Technologies
- Electrical and Electronic Engineering
- Fashion and Textile Technologies
- Hotel Management
- Information and Communication Technology - Software Engineering
- International Business
- International Finance and Accounting
- International Human Resource Management
- Physiotherapy
- Tourism Management

==== Exchange programs ====
The exchange program consists of thirty nine study programs.

- Advanced App Development
- Big Data Technologies
- Biomedical Laboratory Research
- Circular Economy
- Civil Engineering
- Climate and Management
- Cloud Engineering
- Conscious Business
- Creative Design & Technology
- Creative Media and Game Technologies
- Crossing Borders: Global Engagement in Health & Social Work
- Digital Intelligence
- Doing Business with China
- European Project Semester
- Fashion and Textile Technologies
- Global Citizenship
- Hotel Management
- How to Create Killer Content
- Improve Your Business with Data
- Industrial & Sustainable Building
- Innovative Educational Approaches
- Innovative Leadership
- International Business
- International Finance and Accounting
- IT Security
- Legal Skills for European Challenges
- Liberal Arts & Sciences
- Musculoskeletal
- Nanotechnology
- Positive Psychology and Technology
- Risk and Emergency Management
- Robotics and Vision
- Security Management
- Smart Embedded System
- Software Engineering
- Tourism Management
- Urban Development - Public Administration
- Urban Development - Urban and Regional Planning
- Urban Development - Urban Design

==== International master programs ====
The international master program consists of six study programs.

- Facility and Real Estate Management
- Innovative Textile Development
- Master of Arts in Management (MA)
- Master of Business Administration (MBA)
- Master of Science in Applied Nanotechnology
- Master Robotics System Engineering

== Locations ==
Saxion University of Applied Sciences has three campuses in the East of the Netherlands - one campus in each of the three Dutch cities of Deventer, Enschede and Apeldoorn.

=== Enschede ===
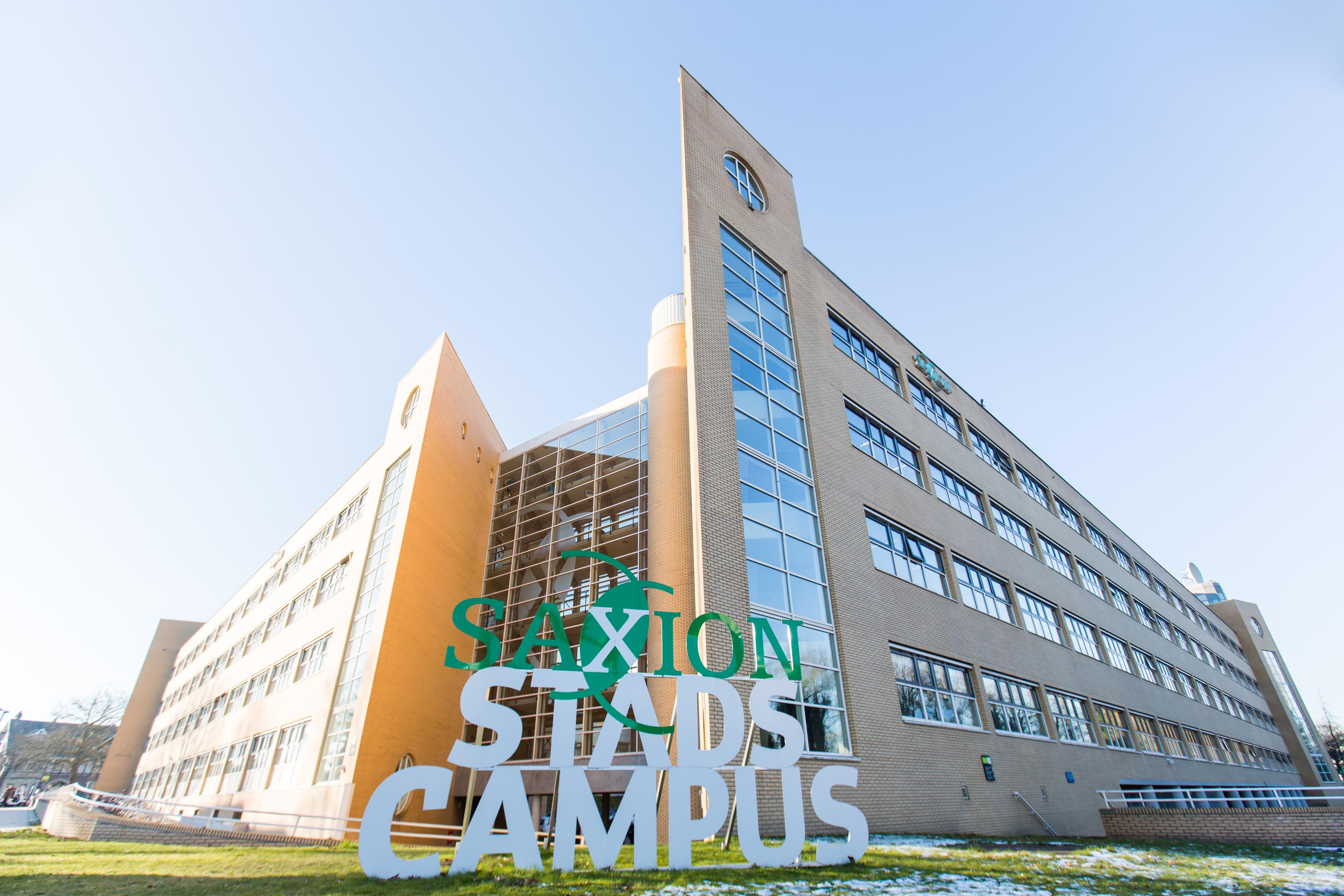
Saxion University of Applied Sciences in Enschede

The campus in Enschede is the first real 'City Campus' in the Netherlands. Characteristic to the building are the pavilions, which lodge different types of education. The campus does not consist of just classrooms, but also of working spaces for individuals or study groups, the so-called ‘study landscape’. The campus is a 5 minutes walk from the city town, so after class students can easily find a study spot in the centre or have a drink with friends. Saxion has housing accommodations in Enschede for all of first year international students from outside EU/EEA. After the first year, student can search for a room or studio in an (international) student accommodation.

=== Deventer ===
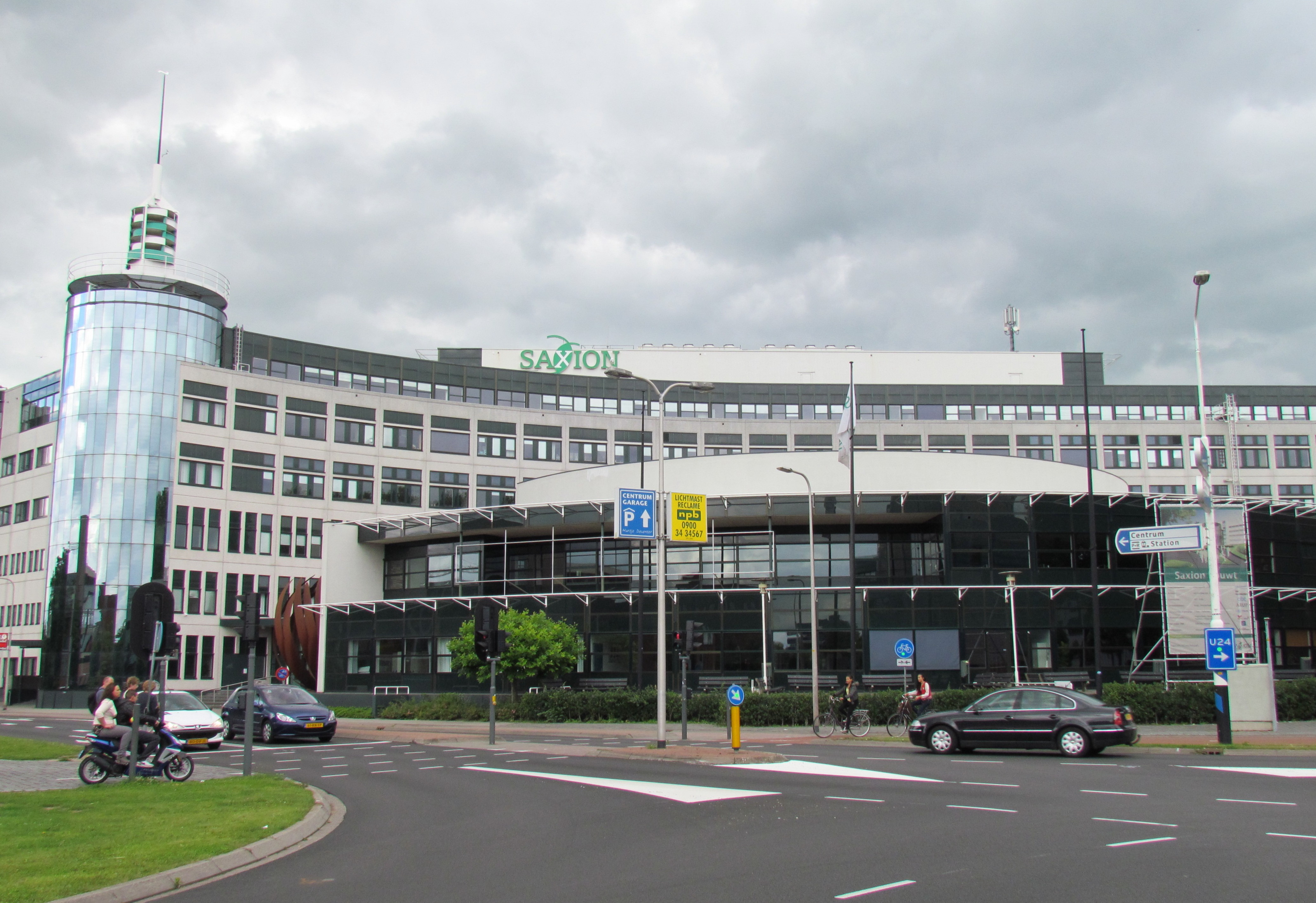
Saxion University of Applied Sciences in Deventer

The Saxion campus in Deventer is located in the city centre, within walking distance of the train station. Its architecture, designed by Dutch architect Paul Dirks, and its location a few minutes from the old town, city centre and arts centre contribute to its learning environment.

=== Apeldoorn ===
Apeldoorn houses Saxion's smallest campus. This modern building is located in the city centre, convenient next to the train station. The catering of the campus is partly provided by Hotel Management students to practise, creating an international gastronomy feeling. The students also have their own wine bar, where they learn all the ins and outs about winetasting and dining.

== International students ==
The university has around 27,000 students over the three campuses, with more than 3,500 international students from 89 different nationalities. The number of students has been growing ever since the founding of the university in 1998.

In the end of 2016 Saxion launched the platform IntoSaxion to support prospective students getting in touch with other Saxion students and experiencing what it's like to study in the Netherlands.
