= Ruth Kattumuri =

Social science researcher

Dr. Ruth Kattumuri FAcSS
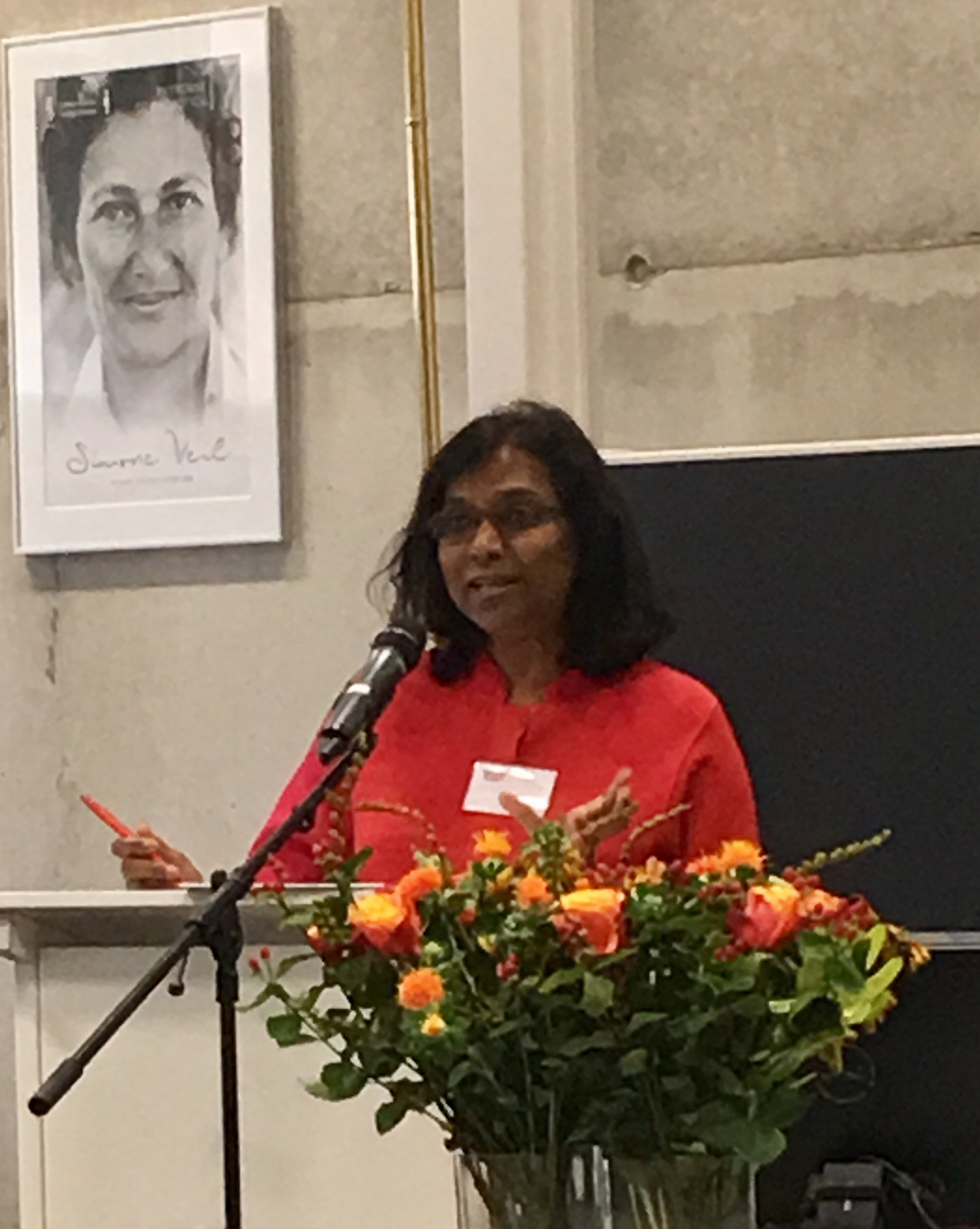
- Ruth Kattumuri

Academic background
- Education: Ph.D. demography/social policy, London School of Economics and Political Science; BSc, MSc, and MPhil, computer science and statistics, University of Madras
- Thesis: Socio-demographic study of HIV/AIDS related knowledge, attitudes and sexual behaviour: Patients from South-India (2008)

Academic work
- Institutions: London School of Economics and Political Science, Commonwealth of Nations

Ruth Kattumuri is a British Indian involved in strategy, inter-government public policy, sustainable development and academia. She is Senior Director Economic, Youth and Sustainable Development at the Commonwealth of Nations. She has been co-director of the India Observatory (IO), a Distinguished Policy Fellow and Founder of the IG Patel Chair and IO at the London School of Economics and Political Science (LSE).

She is engaged in multi-disciplinary evidence-based research and analyses for international development, and impacting inter-governmental policy pertaining to sustainable growth, transparent governance, justice and equality. She is actively involved in influencing sustainable business practices and has developed innovative international leadership and knowledge exchange programmes and collaborations.

== Early life ==
She earned a BSc, MSc, and MPhil in Computer Science and Statistics, Madras Christian College, University of Madras, India. She earned a PhD in Demography/Social Policy from the London School of Economics and Political Science in 2008 with a thesis entitled Socio-demographic study of HIV/AIDS related knowledge, attitudes and sexual behaviour: Patients from South-India.

At Madras Christian College, Kattumuri's professor and mentor was Gift Siromoney, an internationally renowned computer scientist, and founder and chairman of the college's Department of Statistics.

== Career ==
She served as professor of computer science and statistics at Madras Christian College, University of Madras.

Kattumuri became a Cambridge Commonwealth Fellow in 1999. Between 2004 and 2006, she served as LSE's India Head. Kattumuri then founded the IG Patel Chair and the LSE India Observatory in 2007 and became Co-Director of the LSE India Observatory. Between 2006 and 2016, she was also Co-Director of the LSE Asia Research Centre. In 2016, she was elected as Fellow of the Academy of Social Sciences.

From 1997 to 2004, she lectured in advanced research methods for Masters and PhD students across various departments of LSE including the Methodology Institute and Departments of Statistics, Economics, Social Policy and Public Administration.

Her multi-disciplinary research includes:

- Sustainable growth, inclusion and international development
- Human capital development
- Technology and innovation
- Urban planning and development
- Fiscal policies and financial inclusion
- Governance and reforms

Kattumuri is actively engaged in charitable activities as advisor and committee member with several global non-governmental organisations.

== Recognition ==
- Mahatma Gandhi Pravasi Samman Award (2014)
- Blue Ribbon Prize for research at Population Association of America 2004)
- Best Teacher Prize at LSE (2002/03)
- Overseas Research Fellowship for her PhD research at LSE (selected by Committee of Vice-Chancellors and Principals of UK Universities).
