= The Craftsman (book) =

2008 book by Richard Sennett

- First edition
- Author: Richard Sennett
- Published: 2008 (Yale University Press)
- Pages: 326
- ISBN: 9780300119091
- LC Class: BJ1498 .S46X 2008

The Craftsman is a book by Richard Sennett, first published in 2008, about craftmanship and its importance to individuals and society.

== Synopses ==
The book is divided into a prologue, ten chapters split over three parts, and a conclusion. Sennett argues that the spirit of craftmanship involves the "desire to do a job well for its own sake". For Sennett, people motivated purely by material rewards or competition do not tend to produce as good work as those motivated by a sense of craftmanship. The author also argues that being able to participate in craftmanship—as opposed to mere labour, or even to cerebral activity—is good for people's well-being. He tracks the waxing and waning of the craftmanship ethos across history. In the conclusion, Sennett states that the book was written to counter the dim view of manual work arising from the influential Hannah Arendt.
