= Urban Age =

Urban Age is a research programme started in 2005. It is led by LSE Cities with support from Deutsche Bank’s Alfred Herrhausen Society into the relationship between the shape and society of cities. Research includes comparing urbanisation in already urbanised and currently urbanising regions of the world. Urban Age emerged as a product of the research and ideas of LSE Cities' Ricky Burdett, Philipp Rode and Richard Sennett and has since centred around conferences in a range of cities worldwide, as well as accompanying newspapers containing both global data sets and in-depth case studies.

== Conferences ==
The first Urban Age conference was held in New York in February 2005 and subsequent conferences have taken place in Shanghai, London, Berlin, Johannesburg, Mumbai, São Paulo, Istanbul, Chicago, Hong Kong, Rio de Janeiro and Delhi. The Urban Age conferences have aimed to bring together planners, mayors, architects, academics and other stakeholders to discuss themes such as urban health and well-being, urban governance and how cities respond to the impact of major events like the hosting of the Olympic Games. Participants have included a number of current and former city leaders, including Bogotá's Enrique Peñalosa, London's Boris Johnson, Delhi's Sheila Dikshit, Kampala's Jennifer Musisi, and Barcelona's Ada Colau, and national leaders including German Chancellor Angela Merkel and UK Prime Minister David Cameron. The ten year celebration of Urban Age, taking place in November and December 2015, consisted of five Global Debates on cities and climate change, designing urban infrastructure, the politics of equity, social inclusion and steering urban growth. These debates were accompanied by a series of articles published by Guardian Cities. In 2016 Urban Age was invited to curate a Special Project at the 15th International Architecture Exhibition in Venice. Conflicts of an Urban Age highlights the changes to seven cities that have experienced significant population increases in the past 25 years and has since exhibited in Berlin, the inaugural 2017 Seoul Biennale of Architecture and Urbanism and at Arup Group's phase2 gallery in London and Sydney. The Urban Age Shaping Cities conference was held alongside the exhibition. Between 2017-2018 the programme focused on African cities including Addis Ababa, Dar es Salaam, Nairobi, Kampala, Lagos, Accra and Cape Town culminating with the Developing Urban Futures conference and publication in Addis Ababa on 29–30 November 2018.

== Publications and data ==
Each Urban Age conference has also produced a newspaper with feature articles, global, regional and city-specific data and graphics, as well as reflections from conference participants. This content has been organised and disseminated through the Urban Age digital platform, launched in December 2015. Ricky Burdett and Deyan Sudjic have also edited two books: The Endless City (2008) and Living in the Endless City (2011), which chronicle the main findings, discussions and research of the early Urban Age conferences. The Urban Age programme and concept has generated significant debate among urbanists, with critiques and appraisals produced in several academic journals. Urban Age data visualisations have also been featured in a variety of online and print media, including urban footprint graphics, transport infrastructure maps and residential density graphics. A third book in the series, Shaping Cities in an Urban Age, became available in 2018. Edited by Burdett and Philipp Rode, the book was launched at the 16th International Architecture Exhibition in September 2018.

== Urban Age Scholarships ==
Urban Age Scholarships provide financial support to applicants of LSE Cities' Executive MSc in Cities programme in an effort to broaden access to knowledge and debate around how cities are designed and governed.
