= Gorretti Byomire =

Ugadan computer scientist, academic and disability activist

- Born: 1984 (age 41–42); Uganda
- Education: Makerere University (Bachelor of Business Computing) (Master of Science in information technology); University of South Africa (Doctor of Philosophy in information systems)
- Occupations: Computer scientist, academic & disability activist
- Years active: 2006—present
- Title: Lecturer, Department of Applied Computing & Information Technology at Makerere University Business School.

Gorretti Byomire is a Ugandan computer scientist, academic and disability rights activist. She is a lecturer in the Department of Applied Computing & Information Technology at Makerere University Business School (MUBS), in Kampala, Uganda. She concurrently serves as the director of the Disability Resource & Learning Centre at MUBS.

== Background and education ==
Byomire, a Ugandan by birth, was born circa 1984. She attended St. Theresa Namagunga Primary School. She then studied at Trinity College Nabbingo, for both her O-Level and A-level studies.

She holds a Bachelor of Business Computing degree and a Master of Science in Information Technology degree, both obtained from Makerere University, Uganda's oldest and largest public university. As of February 2022, she was pursuing a Doctor of Philosophy in Information Systems at the University of South Africa, in Pretoria.

== Work experience ==
Byomire's career in the Information Technology arena goes back to 2007, after her first degree. She was hired as a graduate teaching assistant at MUBS, while she concurrently pursued her second degree. Over the years, she was promoted to Assistant Lecturer and then to full Lecturer.

== Other considerations ==
Among her many responsibilities, she is a member of MUBS University Council, where she represents people with disabilities (PWDS). She is also a member of the MUBS Technical Advisory Disability Committee (TADC). In addition, she serves as the "focal person" for the Uganda National Council for Disability (UNCD). She is reported to specialize in "disability rights, inclusive education, policy advocacy, technology"... and the rights of youth, particularly girls and those of women.

Byomire is a Mandela Washington Fellow, Class of 2021. While there, she studied public management at the University of Minnesota. Three years earlier, in 2018, she had studied public management at Kenyatta University as a Fellow of the Young African Leaders Institute Regional Leadership Center (YALI RLC).

== See also ==
- Amanda Ngabirano
