= Richard Sennett =

American sociologist

Richard Sennett OBE FBA FRSL
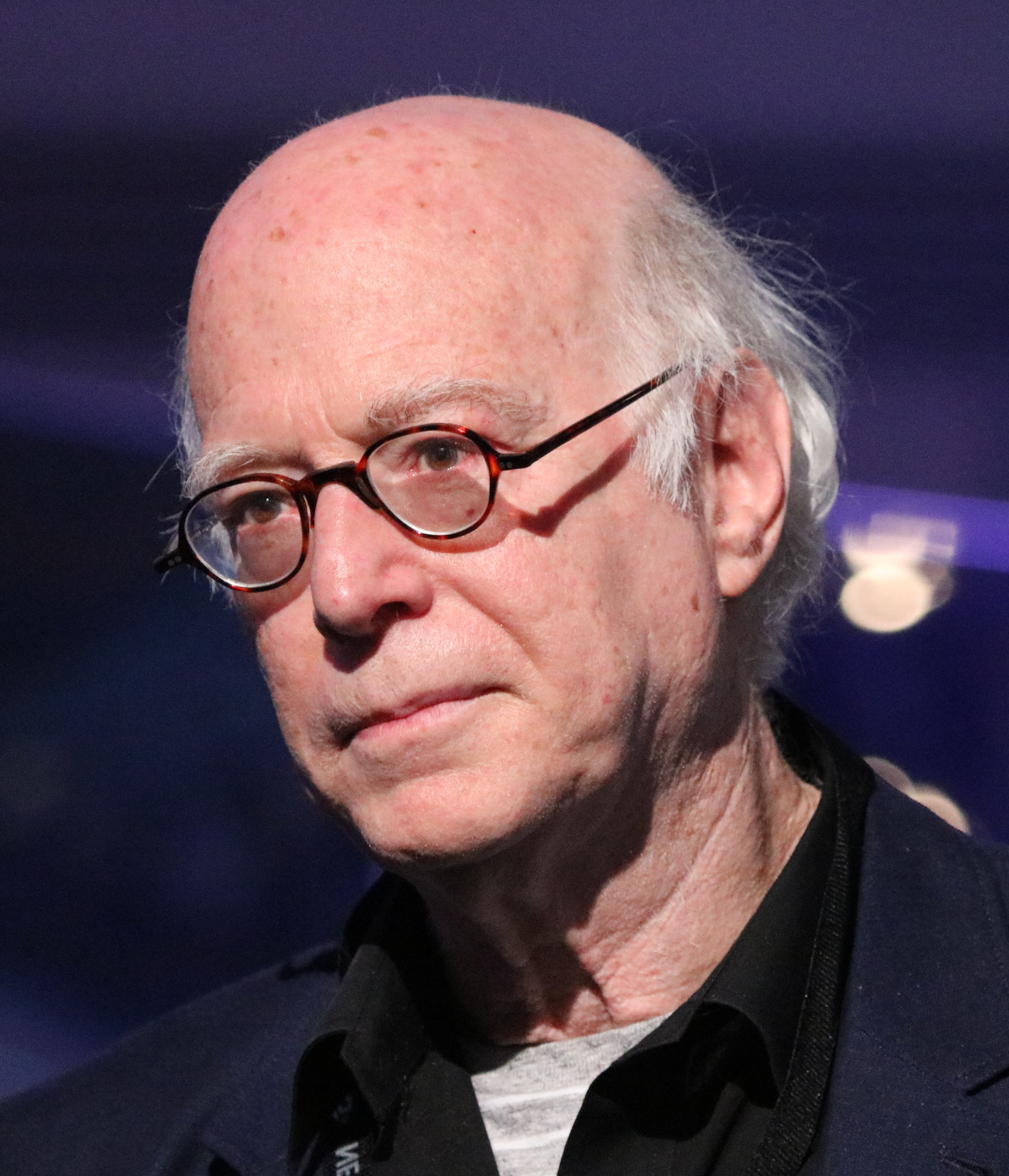
- Sennett in 2016
- Born: 1 January 1943 (age 83); Chicago, Illinois, US
- Known for: Studies of social ties in cities
- Spouse: Saskia Sassen (m. 1987)
- Scientific career
- Fields: Sociology
- Academic advisors: David Riesman, Erik Erikson, Oscar Handlin

Richard Sennett (born 1 January 1943) is an American sociologist who is the Centennial Professor of Sociology at the London School of Economics and former University Professor of the Humanities at New York University. He is currently a Senior Fellow of the Center on Capitalism and Society at Columbia University. Sennett has studied social ties in cities, and the effects of urban living on individuals in the modern world.

He has been a Fellow of The Center for Advanced Study in the Behavioral Sciences, of the American Academy of Arts and Sciences, and of the Royal Society of Literature. He is the founding director of the New York Institute for the Humanities.

== Early life and education ==
Sennett grew up in the Cabrini Green housing project in Chicago, to a Jewish family of Russian emigres. As a child he trained in music, studying the cello. When a hand injury and botched operation to fix it ended his musical career, he entered academia. He studied under David Riesman, Erik Erikson, and Oscar Handlin at Harvard, graduating with his Ph.D. in the History of American Civilization in 1969. His intellectual life as an urbanist came into focus during the time he spent as a fellow of the Joint Center for Urban Studies of Harvard and MIT.

== Career ==
Sennett's scholarly writing centers on the development of cities, the nature of work in modern society, and the sociology of culture. Families Against the City, his earliest book, examines the relationship between family and work in 19th-century Chicago. A subsequent quartet of books explores urban life more largely: The Uses of Disorder, an essay on identity formation in cities; The Fall of Public Man, a history of public culture and public space, particularly in London, Paris, and New York in the 18th and 19th centuries; The Conscience of the Eye, a study of how Renaissance urban design passed into modern city planning, and Flesh and Stone, an overview of the design of cities from ancient to modern times.

Another quartet of books is devoted to labor. The Hidden Injuries of Class is a study of class consciousness among working-class families in Boston; The Corrosion of Character explores how new forms of work are changing our communal and personal experience; Respect probes the relation of work and reforms of the welfare system; and The Culture of the New Capitalism provides an overview of these changes. Authority is an essay in political theory; it addresses the tools of interpretation by which we recast raw power into either legitimate or illegitimate authority.

Sennett is working on a project called "Homo Faber", exploring material ways of making culture. The first book in this series is The Craftsman (2008); subsequent volumes are Together: The Rituals, Pleasures, and Politics of Cooperation (2012) and Building and Dwelling: Ethics for the City (2018), on the making of the urban environment.

In the public realm, Sennett founded, and for a decade directed, the New York Institute of the Humanities at New York University. He then chaired a United Nations commission on urban development and design. As president of the American Council on Work, Sennett led a forum, sponsored by the Rockefeller Foundation, for researchers trying to understand the changing pattern of American labor. Most recently he helped create, and chaired, the LSE Cities Programme at the London School of Economics. The Urban Age project also emerged as a product of the research and ideas by Sennett and others at LSE Cities. In 2006, he chaired the jury at the Venice Biennale.

In 2024, Sennett published The Performer: Art, Life, Politics, which is intended as "the first in a trilogy of books on the fundamental DNA of human expression: performing, narrating, and imaging." The Performer examines a wide range of human roles and interactions from nightclubs to political rallies throughout history to understand the role of performance in every human life.

== Personal life ==
Sennett has been married to sociologist Saskia Sassen since 1987.

== Awards ==
- 1999 – elected Fellow of the Royal Society of Literature
- 2006 – winner of the Hegel Prize awarded by the German city of Stuttgart,
- 2008 – awarded the Gerda Henkel Prize, worth 100,000 Euros, by the Gerda Henkel Foundation of Düsseldorf, Germany,
- 2009 – awarded the Heinrich Tessenow Medal, an honour which, until then, had been reserved for architects and designers.
- 2013 awarded Honorary Doctorate Cambridge University
- 2015 – awarded Premio Hemingway
- 2016 – received the Prix Européen de l'Essai awarded by the Charles Veillon Foundation in Lausanne.
- 2017 received the Presidential Medal of HarvardUniversity
- 2018 – appointed Officer of the Order of the British Empire (OBE) for services to design in the 2018 New Year Honours
- 2018 – elected Fellow of the British Academy (FBA).

== Selected works ==
- Nineteenth Century Cities: Essays in the New Urban History, coauthor, Yale (1969)
- Classic Essays on the Culture of Cities, editor (1969), ISBN 0-13-135194-X
- The Uses of Disorder: Personal Identity and City Life (1970), ISBN 0-393-30909-6
- Families Against the City: Middle Class Homes of Industrial Chicago, 1872–1890, Harvard (1970), ISBN 0-674-29226-X
- The Hidden Injuries of Class, with Jonathan Cobb, Knopf (1972), ISBN 0-393-31085-X
- The Fall of Public Man, Knopf (1977), ISBN 0-14-100757-5
- Authority (1980), ISBN 0-571-16189-8
- The Conscience of the Eye: The design and social life of cities, Faber and Faber (1991), ISBN 0-393-30878-2
- Flesh and Stone: The Body and the City In Western Civilization, Norton (1994), ISBN 0-393-31391-3
- The Corrosion of Character, The Personal Consequences of Work in the New Capitalism, Norton (1998), ISBN 0-393-31987-3
- Respect in a World of Inequality, Penguin (2003), ISBN 0-393-32537-7
- The Culture of the New Capitalism, Yale (2006), ISBN 0-300-11992-5
- The Craftsman, Allen Lane (2008), ISBN 978-0-7139-9873-3
- The Foreigner: Two Essays on Exile, Notting Hill (2011), ISBN 1-907903-08-9
- Together: The Rituals, Pleasures, and Politics of Cooperation, Yale (2012), ISBN 0-300-11633-0
- Building and Dwelling: Ethics for the City, Farrar, Straus and Giroux (2018), ISBN 978-0-374-20033-6
- The Quito Papers and the New Urban Agenda, Routledge (2018), ISBN 978-0-8153-7929-4
- The Performer: Art, Life, Politics, Penguin (2024), ISBN 978-0-2416-3764-7

Fiction

- The Frog Who Dared to Croak (1982), ISBN 0-374-15884-3
- An Evening of Brahms (1984)
- Palais-Royal (1986), ISBN 0-393-31251-8

Literature on Richard Sennett

- Dominik Skala: Urbanität als Humanität. Anthropologie und Sozialethik im Stadtdenken Richard Sennetts. Paderborn: Schoeningh (2015), ISBN 978-3-506-78394-3
- Igor Pelgreffi: "Soggetto, tecnica, scrittura. Su How I write: Sociology as Literature di Richard Sennett ", in M. Iofrida (Eds) Officine Filosofiche, 2, Mucchi, Modena 2015, pp. 95–108 ISBN 978-88-7000-653-7
- Igor Pelgreffi: "Qualità artigianale del lavoro. Elementi per un'antropologia filosofica in Richard Sennett", in M. Iofrida (Eds) Officine Filosofiche, 3, Mucchi, Modena 2016, pp. 95–108 ISBN 978-88-7000-707-7
