= India Observatory =

Research centre of the London School of Economics based in India

The India Observatory (IO) is a research unit at the London School of Economics and Political Science (LSE).

The IO and the IG Patel Chair were established in 2006 in partnership with the Reserve Bank of India (RBI) and the State Bank of India (SBI) in honour of former Director of LSE and former Governor of RBI, Dr IG Patel.

The Director of the IO, and current holder of the IG Patel Chair, is Lord Nicholas Stern of Brentford.

Dr Ruth Kattumuri, Co-Director of the IO, is founder of the IG Patel Chair and the India Observatory.

== IG Patel Lecture Series ==
As well as the IG Patel Chair, the IO hosts the IG Patel Lecture Series. This is a regular lecture in honour of IG Patel. The inaugural lecture was given by Montek Singh Ahluwalia (former Deputy Chairman of the Planning Commission of India) in 2006 and the most recent lecture, the sixth, was given by Tharman Shanmugaratnam (Deputy Prime Minister and Coordinating Minister for Economic and Social Policies in Singapore) in 2017. Other speaker include Nicholas Stern, Amartya Sen and two former Governors of the Reserve Bank of India, Y.V. Reddy and Duvvuri Subbarao.

== Research ==
The purpose of the IO is to engage in public policy in and with India and also increase the generation and exchange of knowledge on India.

The IO undertakes multi-disciplinary and interdisciplinary research. Its main research activities are:

- Sustainable growth, inclusion and development
- Climate change and environmental sustainability in collaboration with the Grantham Research Institute at LSE
- Cities and sustainable development in collaboration with LSE Cities
- Public finance and taxation
- Financing and promotion of sustainable infrastructure
- Palanpur: economic developments in India through the longitudinal experience of one village in Uttar Pradesh

The IO disseminates its research findings through events (including seminars, lectures and conferences) and publications (including working papers, journal articles and books).

== Fellowships ==
The IO hosts two funded fellowships each year: the Sir Ratan Tata Fellowship and the Subir Chowdhury Fellowship on Quality and Economics.

The Sir Ratan Tata Fellowship was established in 1997 in partnership with the Sir Ratan Tata Trust. The Fellowship is for a period of eight months during each academic year, based at the IO. The Fellow is expected to engage in social science research broadly on the Economy and Society in India and South Asia.

The Subir Chowdhury Fellowship on Quality and Economics was established in 2010 and is supported by the Subir and Malini Chowdhury Foundation. The Fellowship is for a period of three months during each academic year, based at the IO. The Fellow is expected to engage in research examining the impact of people quality and behaviour on the economies of Asian nations, prioritising but not restricted to, India and Bangladesh.

== Students ==
The IO works with and supports students through a number of activities.

Jointly with LSE Careers, the IO administers the Tata Social Internship which offers LSE students the opportunity to undertake an 8-week project with the Tata Group in India. These projects have either a development, social enterprise, environmental, sustainable or corporate social responsibility focus and involve a significant research element.

The IO has supported the activities of student societies including the India Society and the Entrepreneurs Society. The IO has supported various activities of the India Society since its inception. These include India Week, The Economic Forum for India at LSE and currently the annual LSE SU India Forum.
