= The Culture of the New Capitalism =

2006 book by Richard Sennett

- Author: Richard Sennett
- Language: English
- Publisher: Yale University Press
- Publication date: 2006
- Publication place: United States
- Pages: 214
- ISBN: 0-300-10782-X

The Culture of the New Capitalism is a 2006 book written by Richard Sennett about the economic situation of the time. In the book, Sennett covers politics, economics, sociology and psychology.

== Analysis ==
Based on the author's Castle Lectures at Yale, the book is a sociological study of the influence of the New Economy on human relationships. Sennett describes the transformations that have taken place in postmodern capitalism as corporations have become more diffuse, unstable, and decentered. Contrasted with the 'iron cage' bureaucracy described by Weber – those pyramid-like corporate structures in which individuals knew their place and planned their futures – modern corporations provide no long-term stability, benefits, social capital, or interpersonal trust.

Sennett first looks at bureaucracy in early capitalism. Most businesses were short lived and unstable. However, in the latter half of the 19th century, business was modelled on predictable military lines where all roles were defined and career progression could be mapped out. This new model aimed at social inclusion, that is, most would work at the base of the social pyramid, hopefully progressing to the tip.

Modern capitalism looks at this model with disdain – too many superfluous people are employed to remain competitive and people should constantly adapt and prove themselves to be assets. Therefore, in large modern businesses, the majority of workers face uncertainty and find it difficult to conceive of a life narrative. Due to mechanization and the need for upskilling, managers as well as their subordinates face the possibility of obsolescence. Concepts such as craftmanship and getting the job right are seen as wasteful and somewhat obsessive.

Capitalism's need for potential is increasingly reflected in the education system. SATs favour superficial and adaptive reasoning rather than deeper introspection on the meaning of things. Finally, comparisons are made between branding and politics. Products such as cars are physically very similar, but branding creates differences on minor issues revolving around appearance and emotion. Sennett views this same 'goldplating' process as having a largely negative influence on modern politics where presentation is key.

== Edition ==
- The Culture of the New Capitalism (Yale University Press, 2006), 214pp. (ISBN 0-300-10782-X). Originally delivered as Castle Lectures in Ethics, Politics, and Economics at Yale University in 2004.
