= Ricky Burdett =

British academic (born 1956)

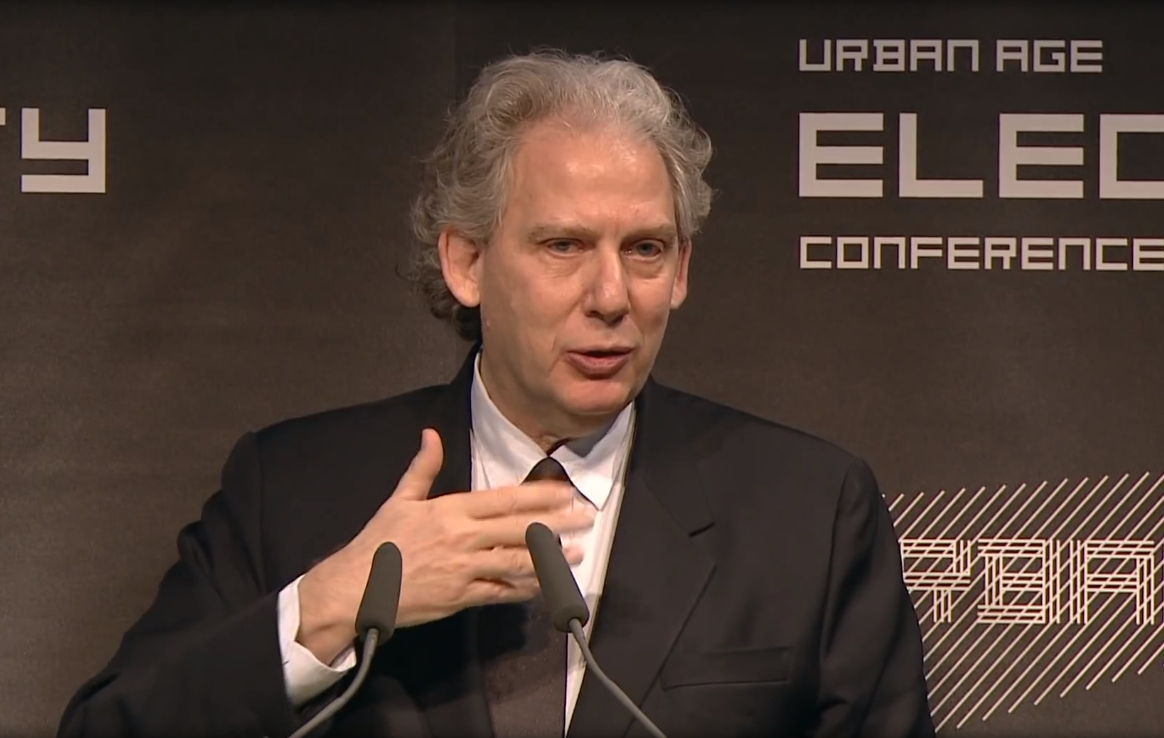

Richard (Ricky) Burdett CBE (London, 1956) is professor of Urban Studies at the London School of Economics and Political Science (LSE), was the founding director of LSE Cities and the Urban Age project, and is now chair of LSE Cities. He is co-chair of the Bloomberg LSE European City Leadership Initiative.

== Biography ==
His interests and activities focus on the interactions between the physical and social worlds of cities. He leads LSE Cities, a global centre of research and teaching at the London School of Economics which was awarded a Queen's Anniversary Prize 2016-2018 for its work on training urban leaders and shaping cities of the future. At LSE, he is co-chair of the Bloomberg LSE European City Leadership Initiative and founded the Urban Age programme, an interdisciplinary investigation of global cities which brings together national and city leaders, academics, designers and civic actors. Burdett was the architectural adviser to the Mayor of London from 2001 to 2006 and Chief Adviser on Architecture and Urbanism for the London 2012 Olympics. He was director of the 2006 Venice Architecture Biennale and curator of the Global Cities exhibition at Tate Modern in London and curator of Rome in the World exhibition at MAXXI in Rome in 2025-2026. In addition to his roles at LSE, Professor Burdett was a member of the Mayor of London's Cultural Leadership Board, member of Council of the Royal College of Art (RCA) in London, a Trustee of the Norman Foster Foundation and chairman of the Jury for the Mies Crown Hall Americas Prize 2016–2018. He was a commissioner on the UK Government's Airports Commission., a member of the US Housing and Urban Development Hurricane Sandy Regional Planning and Design Competition and the Rockefeller Foundation's 100 Resilient Cities initiative. Burdett acts as a consultant to national and city governments, private developers and philanthropic agencies around the world. He is co-editor of "The Endless City" (2007), "Living in the Endless City" (2011), "Transforming Urban Economies" (2013), "The SAGE Handbook of the 21st Century City" (2017) and "Shaping Cities in an Urban Age" (2018).

Burdett was appointed Commander of the Order of the British Empire (CBE) for services to urban planning and design in the 2017 New Year Honours and awarded an Honorary Fellowship from the Royal College of Art in 2019.

== Selected works ==
- Shaping Cities in an Urban Age, co-editor
- The SAGE Handbook of the 21st Century, co-editor, 2017
- Living in the Endless City, co-editor, 2011
- The Endless City, co-editor, 2007
