= Sabrina Kitaka =

Ugandan physician

- Born: 1971 (age 54–55); Nsambya, Uganda
- Citizenship: Ugandan
- Education: Mount Saint Mary's College Namagunga (Uganda Advanced Certificate of Education); Makerere University (Bachelor of Medicine and Bachelor of Surgery) (Master of Medicine in Pediatrics); Infectious Diseases Institute (Fellowship in Pediatric Infectious Diseases); University of Antwerp (Doctor of Philosophy)
- Occupations: Pediatrician and Academic
- Years active: 2002–present
- Title: Senior Lecturer in the Department of Pediatrics at Makerere University School of Medicine
- Spouse: (Engineer Andrew Kitaka)

Sabrina Bakeera Kitaka (née Sabrina Bakeera), commonly known as Sabrina Kitaka, is a Ugandan physician, pediatrician, pediatric infectious diseases specialist and academic, who serves as a senior lecturer in the Department of Pediatrics at Makerere University School of Medicine.

== Background and education ==
Kitaka was born at Nsambya, in the city of Kampala, to Teddy Bakeera, a retired nurse and the late Paul Samuel Ssemuli Bakeera, a mining engineer with Kilembe Mines.

She attended Namuhunga Primary School in Kelembe. She then transferred to Mount Saint Mary's College Namagunga, in Mukono District, where she completed her O-Level and A-Level education.

She was admitted to Makerere University in 1990, graduating in 1995 with a Bachelor of Medicine and Bachelor of Surgery. She interned at Saint Francis Hospital Nsambya. In 2002, she received a Master of Medicine degree in Pediatrics and Child Health, also from Makerere. She followed that with a Fellowship in Pediatric Infectious Diseases at the Infectious Diseases Institute at Mulago, in Kampala, Uganda's capital city.

As of March 2018, she was pursuing a Doctor of Philosophy degree in paediatric HIV/AIDS, at the School of Biomedical Sciences at the University of Antwerp in Belgium, a task she completed in 2020.

== Career ==
Kitaka is a specialist in infectious diseases among children and adolescents, with special interest in HIV/AIDS infections among adolescents. She instructs MBChB and MMed students in paediatrics and adolescent medicine at Makerere University School of Medicine.

Kitaka has published widely in peer journals and has over 30 published professional articles to her name. She presents often at medical conferences inside and outside Uganda. She also gives motivational speeches to appropriate audiences.

She served as a consultant to the World Health Organization while formulating health guidelines for pneumonia among children living with HIV/AIDS. She is a Fellow of the Uganda National Academy of Sciences.

== Family ==
Kitaka is married to Engineer Andrew Kitaka, who was employed by the Kampala Capital City Authority and is currently a private consultant and together, they are parents of five children.

== Other considerations ==
Kitaka teaches Sunday School at All Saints Church, Mutundwe, her home place of worship. She is the Director of the Adolescent Health training program at the Makerere University College of Health Sciences and is the Founder President of the Society of Adolescent Health in Uganda. Kitaka is also an active member of the African Pediatric Society of Infectious Diseases (AFSPID).

== See also ==
- Rhoda Wanyenze
- Pauline Byakika
