= Deyan Sudjic =

British writer and broadcaster (born 1952)

Deyan Sudjic OBE
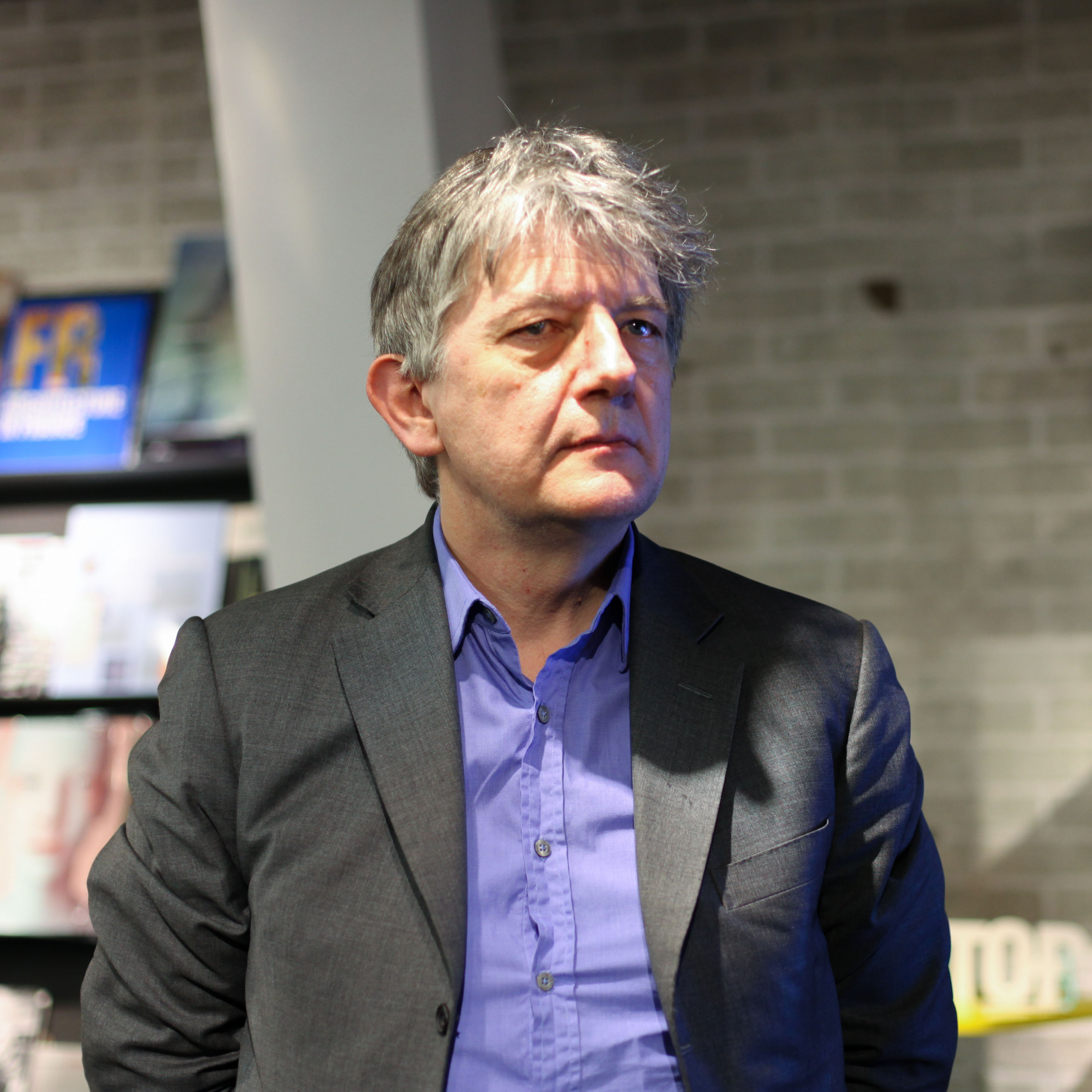
- Sudjic in 2013
- Born: 6 September 1952 (age 73); London, England, UK
- Education: Latymer Upper School, London
- Alma mater: University of Edinburgh
- Occupation(s): Director, Writer, Broadcaster
- Known for: Director, Design Museum, London (2006—2020); Editor, Domus (2000—2004); Director, Venice Architecture Biennale (2002); Director, Glasgow's UK City of Architecture and Design programme (1999); Co-founder, later Editor and Editorial Director, Blueprint architecture magazine (1983)
- Spouse: Sarah Miller
- Children: Olivia Sudjic

Deyan Sudjic OBE (born 6 September 1952) is a British writer and broadcaster, specialising in the fields of design and architecture. He was formerly the director of the Design Museum, London.

== Life and career ==
Sudjic grew up in Acton, London; his Serbian parents, who were immigrants from Yugoslavia, spoke Serbo-Croatian at home. His parents "lived the high life" after the Second World War, his father, Misha, working as foreign correspondent for Tanjug, the Yugoslav state news agency, then for a time, in less comfortable circumstances, as a bulletin-writer for the BBC World Service, also "working away sporadically on ill-fated plans to make a fortune" including selling non-stick frying pans, holiday lets, and DIY. He was later employed by a travel company taking tourists to Yugoslavia, then relocated to Sveti Stefan, working at a hotel on the Adriatic Sea until he was hospitalized for alcoholism; brought back to the UK by his family, he finally worked as a security guard in a Kirkcaldy shopping centre. Sudjic's mother, Seja, took jobs teaching, translating Serbo-Croatian, and in the homeware department at Harrods.

Sudjic was educated at Latymer Upper School, at the time a direct grant grammar school, based in Hammersmith in West London. He attended the University of Edinburgh.

In 1970, as a teen, he contributed to Schoolkids OZ, the subject of an obscenity trial the following year.

Sudjic was the design and architecture critic for The Observer, the Dean of the Faculty of Art, Design and Architecture at Kingston University, visiting professor at the Royal College of Art, and co-chair of the Urban Age Advisory Board.

In 1983, he co-founded, with Peter Murray and Simon Esterson, Blueprint, a monthly architecture magazine and went on to be the magazine's editor and then its editorial director. From 2000–04, he was the editor of Domus. In 2000, he was made OBE.

He was the director of Glasgow's UK City of Architecture and Design program in 1999, and the director of the Venice Architecture Biennale in 2002. Sudjic became director of the Design Museum in 2006.

Sudjic has contributed to The Guardian, the London Review of Books, and other publications.

== Honours ==
Sudjic was appointed Officer of the Order of the British Empire (OBE) in the 2000 Birthday Honours for services to architecture.

In 2012, he was awarded an honorary degree from the University for the Creative Arts.

== Selected publications ==
- Cult Objects. Paladin Books. 1985. ISBN 0-586-08483-5.
- Cult Heroes: How To Be Famous For More Than Fifteen Minutes. Andre Deutsch. 1989. ISBN 0-233-98355-4.
- The 100 Mile City. Harcourt. 1993. ISBN 0-15-642357-X.
- Ron Arad. Laurence King Publishing. 2001. ISBN 1-85669-258-2.
- Foster, Norman (2001). De Grey, Spencer (ed.). Norman Foster and the British Museum. Prestel Verlag. ISBN 3-7913-2541-8.
- John Pawson Themes and Projects. Phaidon. 2004. ISBN 0-7148-4452-7.
- Future Systems. Phaidon. 2006. ISBN 0-7148-4469-1.
- The Edifice Complex: How the Rich and Powerful Shape the World. Penguin. 2006. ISBN 0-14-101672-8.
- The Language of Things: Understanding the World of Desirable Objects. W.W. Norton. 2009. ISBN 978-0-393-07081-1.
- Norman Foster: A Life in Architecture. Weidenfeld. 2010. ISBN 978-0-297-85868-3.
- B is for Bauhaus. Particular Books (an imprint of Penguin). 2014. ISBN 9780140515930.
- Ettore Sottsass and the Poetry of Things. Phaidon. 2015. ISBN 9780714869537.
- Stalin's Architect: Power and Survival in Moscow. MIT Press. 2022. ISBN 9780262046862.
