= Engineers Registration Board =

Engineering organization of Uganda

- Formation: 1 December 1969; 56 years ago
- Type: Statutory Authority
- Location: Kampala, Uganda
- Members: 842 (2018)
- Key people: Michael Odongo; Chairman; Henry Francis Okinyal; Vice Chairman
- Website: http://www.erb.go.ug

The Engineers Registration Board (ERB), is a statutory authority established in 1969, under the Engineers Registration Act (ERA) Cap 271, whose mission is to regulate and supervise the profession of engineering in Uganda.

== Location ==
As of March 2018, the headquarters and offices of the ERB are temporarily housed at the offices of the Uganda Ministry of Works and Transport at Kyambogo, while efforts to secure a permanent location are ongoing, with the help of the Uganda Investment Authority. The geographical coordinate of the ERB headquarters are: 00°20'24.0"N, 32°37'37.0"E (Latitude:0.339999; Longitude:32.626949).

== Overview ==
Under its mandate, the ERB is authorized to (a) register (b) de-register (c) restore registration (d) suspend registration (e) hold inquiries (f) hear appeals and (f) appear as respondents against a case brought against it in the High Court. It is also mandated to advise the government regarding the engineering sector.

The board is appointed by the Ugandan Minister of Works and Transport in consultation with the Uganda Institute of Professional Engineers (UIPE), the professional body of engineers in the country, who are guaranteed for positions on the board.

The 17th Board was named on 15 March 2018, by the Ugandan Minister of Works and Transport, Engineer Monica Azuba Ntege. The ERB members named are:

1. Michael Odongo: Chairman
2. Henry Francis Okinyal: Vice Chairman
3. Andrew Kitaka: Member
4. Elias Bahanda
5. Michael Pande
6. Florence Lubwama Kiyimba
7. Peter Balimunsi
8. Ronald Namugera: Board Registrar

Registered engineers in Uganda, enjoy cross-border reciprocity of recognition of credentials in the countries of the countries of the East African Community (Burundi, Kenya, Rwanda, Tanzania and South Sudan).

As of 25 January 2018, there were 842 registered engineers, of whom 774 were Uganda nationals with full operational licences and 68 were foreigners with temporary registration. 720 of the registered engineers are concentrated in Kampala, with only 105 scattered across the remaining 120 districts.

== Governance ==
The current board is haired by Engineer Michael Odongo, who id deputized by Engineer Henry Francis Okinyal.

== See also ==
Ministry of Works and Transport (Uganda)
