= Judith Tukahirwa =

Ugandan environmental scientist

Judith Tukahirwa Tumusiime
- Born: 1970 (age 55–56); Uganda
- Citizenship: Uganda
- Education: Makerere University (Bachelor of Science Education) (Master of Science in Environment and Natural Resources); Wageningen University (Doctorate in Urban Sanitation and Solid Waste Management); Harvard University; Executive Education
- Occupations: Environmental scientist and management executive
- Years active: 1998 – present
- Known for: Expertise in water and sanitation
- Title: Deputy executive director Kampala Capital City Authority
- Spouse: Edmund Tumusiime

Judith Tukahirwa Tumusiime (née Judith Tukahirwa) is a Ugandan environmental scientist, water and sanitation consultant, and former management executive. She is the immediate past deputy executive director of the Kampala Capital City Authority (KCCA). She was appointed to that position in December 2012. She resigned on 31 October 2016, citing interference from politicians and security agencies.

== Background and education ==
She was born in Uganda circa 1970. Tukahirwa attended the Shimoni Primary School in the city centre at that time and Trinity College Nabbingo for her O-Level and A-Level studies. She studied at Makerere University, where she obtained a Bachelor of Science Education in biology and chemistry. Later, she obtained a Master of Science in environment and natural resources, also from Makerere. Her doctorate in urban sanitation and solid waste management was obtained from Wageningen University in the Netherlands. The subject of her doctoral thesis was about the role of civil society organizations in urban sanitation and solid waste management in cities within East Africa. Later, she received executive training from the John F. Kennedy School of Government at Harvard University.

== Career ==
In 1998, she started teaching biology and chemistry at St. Mary's College Kisubi. Following her doctoral studies, she worked as a researcher on the Lake Victoria Environment Project in the Uganda Ministry of Lands and Urban Development, sponsored by the World Bank. Her initial involvement with KCCA was when she was hired as a consultant on solid waste management. Later, she was appointed acting director of public health and environment. In December 2012, President Yoweri Museveni appointed her deputy executive director of the KCCA. In October 2016, she resigned from that position.

== Other responsibilities ==
She is married to architect Edmund Tumusiime and together are the parents of four children. Tukahirwa also serves a member of the board of directors of the National Water and Sewerage Corporation, Uganda's largest water and sanitation utility.

== See also ==
- Jennifer Musisi
- List of cities and towns in Uganda
