= Jennifer Musisi =

Ugandan lawyer, administrator and academic

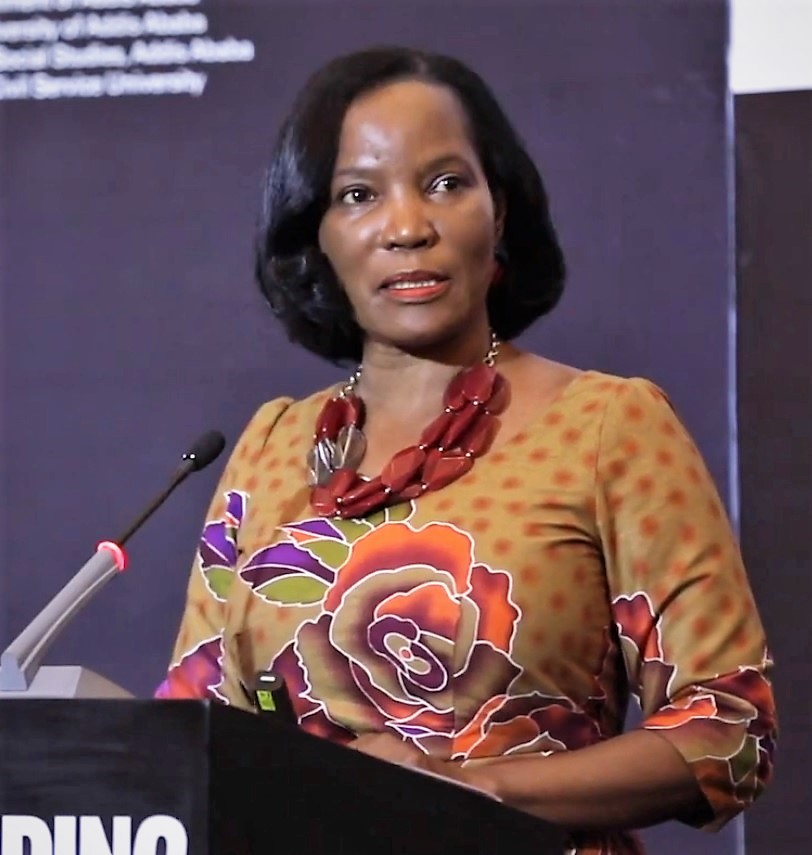
- Semakula-Musisi speaking on Urban Age in 2019
- Born: Uganda
- Citizenship: Ugandan
- Education: Makerere University (Bachelor of Laws) (Master of Public Administration); Law Development Centre (Diploma in Legal Practice)
- Occupations: Lawyer, public administrator
- Years active: 1987–present
- Title: City Leader in Residence at Bloomberg Harvard City Leadership Initiative
- Term: January 2019 – Present
- Predecessor: None
- Spouse: Frederick Musisi

Jennifer Semakula Musisi is a Ugandan lawyer and public administrator. She is the first City Leader in Residence at Bloomberg Harvard City Leadership Initiative at the Ash Center of the Harvard Kennedy School, in Cambridge, Massachusetts, United States. She was appointed to this position in January 2019.

She served as the first Executive Director of the Kampala Capital City Authority. She was appointed to that position in April 2011 by the President of Uganda, following the creation of the new institution that replaced Kampala City Council. She assumed office on 15 April 2011. On 27 February 2014, the President of Uganda re-appointed her for another three-year term, effective 14 April 2014. Her contract was renewed in April 2017, to run from 15 April 2017 until 14 April 2020. However, on 15 October 2018, she tendered her resignation as KCCA Executive Director, effective 15 December 2018.

== Background and education ==
Musisi was born in Kampala in the Central Region of Uganda, during the 1960s. She did her O'levels at Tororo Girls School in Tororo District before transferring to King's College Buddo in Wakiso District for her A'levels. She graduated from Budo on the top of her class in 1982. She also served as deputy head prefect during her time at the school.

In 1982, she entered Makerere University, Uganda's oldest university, where she studied law. She graduated in 1986 with the degree of Bachelor of Laws (LLB). The following year, she obtained the Diploma in Legal Practice from the Law Development Centre in Kampala, the capital of Uganda. Later, she obtained the degree of Master of Public Administration (MPA) from Makerere University. She also has qualifications in management, taxation, and law from several institutions including Harvard Law School and George Washington University in the United States. The exhaustive list of qualifications attained and training programs undertaken by Musisi are presented below.

== Academic and other qualifications ==
- Master of Public Administration & Management, Makerere University, Kampala, Uganda (1996–1997)
- Diploma in Legal Practice, Law Development Centre, Kampala, Uganda (1985–1986)
- Bachelor of Laws (Honors), Makerere University, Kampala, Uganda (1982–1985).

== Career ==
Musisi is a lawyer, advocate of the High Court of Uganda and seasoned administrator with a strong legal, administrative and leadership background. She trained at Makerere University, Kampala, Uganda as well as numerous other institutions including the George Washington University, Harvard Business School and Harvard Law School.

Musisi briefly worked as a State Attorney in the Directorate of Public Prosecutions and moved on to become the Assistant Secretary Legal Affairs for Makerere University. She was then appointed Head of Legal Services for the Uganda Revenue Authority (URA). Her position was then elevated to Commissioner Legal Services and Board Affairs in the same institution, a position in which she served with distinction for several years. Together with Allen Kagina, Musisi led the formulation and implementation of the Institutional Reforms and Restructuring Programme at Uganda Revenue Authority.

In URA, Musisi was involved in policy formulation, legislative drafting and initiation of amendments, as well as policy implementation at the executive and board levels. She was also a key player in financial planning and management. During this period, she was responsible for originating several policies, like the whistle-blower policy, aimed at increasing integrity and stamping out corruption. One of her key achievements was the recovery of the 8-acre piece of land on which the URA headquarters stands today. She was also the leader and key member of the team which oversaw the recovery of vast sums of tax monies owed to Government, including taxes accruing from oil exploration activities. Her role as Commissioner Legal Services and Board Affairs also involved working closely with the Commissioner General and the Senior Management Team, the Board of Directors and various stakeholders including government ministries, the Tax Appeals Tribunal and the Uganda judicial system.

In 2011, Musisi was appointed by the President of Uganda as the first Executive Director of the Kampala Capital City Authority. She led the formulation and implementation of transformation of the City Administration from a Local Government to a corporate entity under the Central Government. In March 2014, her contract was renewed for another three years, to run from 15 April 2014 until 14 April 2017. Her contract was further renewed in April 2017, to run from 15 April 2017 until 14 April 2020. However, on 15 October 2018, she tendered her resignation as KCCA Executive Director, effective 15 December 2018, citing inadequate funding and irreconcilable competing interests between the KCCA Technical Team and politicians, that made it increasingly difficult to achieve the set transformational targets.

In her farewell speech, Musisi handed over 250 land titles belonging to KCCA, with another 56 still being processed (total of 306 land titles).

== Achievements ==
In her career at the helm of the various public institutions, Musisi has led several teams to register numerous successes, some of which are highlighted below:

- Established the Uganda Employment Service Bureau and Skills Development Centre
- Initiated the I-serve program for skilling young graduates
- Established the Kyanja Agricultural Resource Centre of Excellence for Urban Agriculture
- Established the Kyanja Concrete Yard for Infrastructure Projects
- Introduced Specialized Services in KCCA Health centres including a Renal Unit in Kisenyi Health Centre, 10 Dental Units
- Constructed maternity units in Kawaala and Kitebi Health Centers
- Upgraded Kawempe and Kiruddu Health centres to 200-bed Referral Hospitals
- Established 6 Savings and Credit Cooperative Societies for KCCA Technical Staff, KCCA Health Workers, KCCA Teachers, KCCA Drivers, KCCA Law Enforcement and KCCA Waste Workers)
- Established the Annual Kampala City Festival
- Established the Kampala Sunday Street Market
- Constructed the 2000-capacity Wandegeya Market
- Procured and Initiated the more than 6-acre USAFI market and Transport Terminal Complex
- Held the Inaugural East and Central African Cities Development Forum
- Restarted the Passenger Rail Services
- Established the Kampala Water and Sanitation Forum
- Established the Kampala Migration Forum
- Established the Kampala Solid Waste Management Private Sector Platform
- Initiated the Kampala Street Naming, House Numbering and Addressing Project
- Established new and specialized Business Units in Kampala including the Land Management Unit, Risk Management Unit and Client Care
- Established award-winning Social Media Platforms for KCCA
- Held the only Future of Cities Forum in Africa
- Established the Kampala Climate Change Action Plan
- Oversaw the formulation of the Kampala Climate-Smart Capital Investment Plan
- Revamped the Kabalagala Youth Centre
- Revamped the KCCA Football Club into a Continental Powerhouse
- Constructed the Phillip Omondi Stadium as the first FIFA-certified Astro-turf Stadium in Uganda
- Established the East African Customs Union and law

== Personal life ==
Musisi is a married mother.

== Recognition and awards ==
Musisi has been the recipient of numerous prestigious International, Regional and National awards. Some of the awards and honors she has received include:

1. Honorary Doctor of Philosophy in Humanities: United Graduate College, US, January, 2016
2. IHS Alumni International Urban Professional Award – Rotterdam, The Netherlands, 2018
3. African Virtuous Women Award: African Agent of Change 2018, Abuja
4. Grand Global Award for Integrity and Excellence in Leadership – Global Leadership Training USA, 2016.
5. Country Winner (Agencies and Regulatory Authorities Sector) CEO Global Africa's Most Influential Women in Business and Government Award 2015/16
6. Regional Winner (Agencies and Regulatory Authorities Sector) CEO Global Africa's Most Influential Women in business and Government Award 2015/16
7. The Governance Award – African Leadership Award and Medal of Honor in Business. New York 2018
8. Selected as one of the 100 Exceptional Leaders in the Commonwealth 2014–15
9. Paul Harris Awards 2013 and 2014 from The Rotary Foundation of Rotary International
10. Vocational Award 2012/2013 for Dedicated and Selfless Service from the Rotary Club of Sunrise Kampala
11. Certificate of Appreciation from Inspirational Development Uganda
12. Appreciation award – Makerere University 82nd Guild Uganda
13. Airtel Woman of Substance Award 2013 for Outstanding Contribution to Uganda's Public Service
14. Inspirational Woman of Uganda Award for Exemplary Leadership – 2013
15. Philadelphia City Citation presented by the Mayor of Philadelphia Michael A. Nutter – August/September 2012
16. Medal of Achievement for Distinguished Service to the Nation – King's College, Budo – 2008
17. Award for Best Performing Student at King's College Budo – UCE 1982
18. National Award as the 4th Best Performing Student in Uganda – UACE 1982

== Memberships/fellowships/associations ==
1. Advocate of the High Court of Uganda and all Courts subordinate thereto
2. Commissioner for Oaths
3. Member of the Uganda Law Society
4. Honorary Member of the Uganda Society of Architects
5. Council Member of Cities that Work organization
6. Uganda's Ambassador for UN Sustainable Development Goal 11

== Succession table as Executive Director of KCCA ==
Preceded by None; Prior to 2011	Executive Director; Kampala Capital City Authority; April 2011 – December 2018	Succeeded by Andrew Kitaka (December 2018 – June 2020) (Acting)
