= Rhoda Wanyenze =

Ugandan physician and academic

- Born: Uganda
- Education: Makerere University; University of Antwerp
- Occupations: Physician; Academic; Medical Administrator
- Known for: Medical expertise, Leadership
- Title: Dean of Makerere University School of Public Health

Rhoda Wanyenze is a physician, public health consultant, academic and medical administrator, who serves as the Dean of Makerere University School of Public Health, a component school of Makerere University College of Health Sciences, which is part of Makerere University, Uganda's oldest and largest public university.

She was appointed to that position in September 2017, replacing Professor William Bazeyo, who was promoted to Deputy Vice Chancellor of Makerere University, in charge of Finance and Administration.

== Early life and education ==
She was born in Uganda. After attending local primary schools, she entered Nabisunsa Girls' Secondary School where she completed her O-Level education. She then transferred to Mount Saint Mary's College Namagunga for her A-Level studies.

She was admitted to Makerere University to study human medicine, graduating from there with a Bachelor of Medicine and Bachelor of Surgery (MBChB) degree. Following her internship, she joined the Uganda People's Defence Force (UPDF), as a civilian clinician-contractor. After seven years with the UPDF, she went back to Makerere University and registered in the Master of Public Health program, as a student, graduating in 2002. In 2010, she was awarded a Doctor of Philosophy (PhD) degree by the University of Antwerp in Belgium.

== Career ==
Wanyenze has long and varied clinical and public health experience in tropical diseases research, with emphasis on tuberculosis and HIV/AIDS. She has worked at the Makerere University School of Public Health, since 2008. She has managed the postgraduate fellowship program at the School of Public Health, funded by the Centers for Disease Control and Prevention, and the Global Fund, among others. She has also carried out original research in the areas of maternal and child health.

In September 2017, Wanyenze was appointed as the dean of Makerere University School of Public Health, replacing Professor William Bazeyo.

== Research ==
She has been involved in studies mostly about HIV which has brought to light new findings about the virus. some of her articles include; Uptake of family planning methods and unplanned pregnancies among HIV-infected individuals: a cross-sectional survey among clients at HIV clinics in Uganda. The study found that the uptake of family planning among HIV-infected individuals is fairly high even though there are a large number of unplanned pregnancies. Factors associated with Virological Non-suppression among HIV-Positive patients on Antiretroviral Therapy in Uganda, August 2014–July 2015. "When they know that you are a sex worker, you will be the last person to be treated": Perceptions and experiences of female sex workers in accessing HIV services in Uganda. This study found out that societal, structural and policy level barriers are required to increase access to HIVservices among FSWs in Uganda. "If You Tell People That You Had Sex with a Fellow Man, It Is Hard to Be Helped and Treated": Barriers and Opportunities for Increasing Access to HIV Services among Men Who Have Sex with Men in Uganda. This study established that negative perceptions among providers and the community present barriers to service access among MSM. Retention of HIV infected pregnant and breastfeeding women on option B+ in Gomba District, Uganda: a retrospective cohort study. Guidelines for reporting trial protocols and completed trials modified due to the COVID-19 pandemic and other extenuating circumstances. Hypertension awareness, treatment and control in Africa: a systematic review. The study established that there are low levels of awareness and treatment of hypertension and even lower levels of control. The costs and effectiveness of four HIV counselling and testing strategies in Uganda. The study found that all testing strategies had relatively low per client costs. Strengthening district-based health reporting through the district health management information software system: the Ugandan experience. The article established that implementation of DHIS2 resulted in improved timeliness and completeness in reporting of routine outpatient, inpatient and health service usage data from the district to the national level. The COVID-19 pandemic in the African continent. Fertility and contraceptive decision-making and support for HIV infected individuals: client and provider experiences and perceptions at two HIV clinics in Uganda. COVID-19 awareness, adoption of COVID-19 preventive measures, and effects of COVID-19 lockdown among adolescent boys and young men in Kampala, Uganda. The study suggested the need for appropriate health promotion, mental health and socio-economic interventions targeting ABYM in Kampala, Uganda. Missed opportunities for HIV testing and late-stage diagnosis among HIV-infected patients in Uganda. Women's views on consent, counselling and confidentiality in PMTCT: a mixed-methods study in four African countries. The need for COVID-19 research in low- and middle-income countries. Facilitators and barriers to uptake and adherence to lifelong antiretroviral therapy among HIV infected pregnant women in Uganda: a qualitative study. Linkage to HIV care and survival following inpatient HIV counselling and testing. Fertility desires and unmet need for family planning among HIV infected individuals in two HIV clinics with differing models of family planning service delivery.

== See also ==
- David Serwadda
- Harriet Mayanja-Kizza
- Makerere University School of Medicine
