= Daniel Kyabayinze =

Daniel Japheth Kyabayinze
- Citizenship: Ugandan
- Education: Mbarara University of Science and Technology; Makerere University; University of Antwerp; Southeastern University
- Occupations: Medical doctor; Clinical epidemiologist; Public health specialist
- Years active: 2010–present
- Employer: Ministry of Health of Uganda
- Organization: Ministry of Health of Uganda
- Known for: Public health and malaria control
- Title: Director of Public Health

Daniel Kyabayinze also known as Daniel Japheth Kyabayinze is a Ugandan medical doctor, clinical epidemiologist and public health specialist who serves as the Director of Public Health at the Ministry of Health of Uganda.

== Education background ==
Kyabayinze studied medicine at Mbarara University of Science and Technology, where he obtained a Bachelor of Medicine and Bachelor of Surgery (MBChB). He later obtained a master's degree in clinical epidemiology and biostatistics from Makerere University before obtaining a PhD in medical sciences from the University of Antwerp in Belgium.

He also had a training in molecular biology and research at the University of California and completed a clinical elective in obstetrics and gynaecology at Tameside Hospital in England. He later obtained a postgraduate diploma in organisational leadership from Southeastern University in the United States.

== Career ==
Kyabayinze began his career in 2010 by working as a clinical epidemiologist and research officer with Malaria Consortium–Africa, where his work focused on malaria and tropical diseases. He had also worked with the Regional Centre for Quality of Health Care and the Uganda Malaria Surveillance Project at Makerere University.

In 2018, Kyabayinze was among researchers from the Ministry of Health and the Uganda Public Health Fellowship Program who investigated a malaria outbreak in Nwoya District following heavy rainfall and the formation of mosquito-breeding sites. He also served on the editorial team of the Ministry of Health's malaria quarterly bulletin, contributing to the sharing of information on malaria prevention and control.

During the COVID-19 pandemic, he served as the National Vaccination Commander and in November 2021, Kyabayinze became Director of Public Health at the Ministry of Health. He is also a member of the World Health Organization's Strategic Advisory Group of Experts and participates in the Roll Back Malaria Partnership.

Kyabayinze serves as a team doctor for the Uganda Swimming Federation and chairs the Medical and Doping Control Committee for the Africa Cup of Nations and African Nations Championship activities in Uganda.

== See also ==
- Harriet Mayanja-Kizza
- Moses R. Kamya
- Fred Wabwire-Mangen
