= Doreen Okong Alaleit =

Doreen Okong Alaleit is a Ugandan physician who works at Mulago National Referral Hospital in Kampala as the Emergency Medicine Doctor. She heads the Resuscitation Team at Mulago Hospital. Alaleit serves as the president of Emergency Care Association of Uganda.

== Education and background ==
Doreen Alaleit was raised in a family of healthcare workers with her father who worked as an Obstetrician, and her mother as a nurse. In 2028, she joined the Master of Medicine in Emergency Medicine at Makerere University, a program introduced by Seed Global Health.

== Career ==
Alaleit is a teacher of emergency medicine to undergraduate and graduate student nurses at Makerere University, and works as an Educator at Seed Global Health. She is one of only 25 emergency medicine doctors in Uganda and leads the resuscitation team at the emergency ward in Mulago Hospita. She has authored a journal article titled "Description and Analysis of the emergency obstetric inter-facility ambulance transfers to Kawempe National Referral Hospital in Kampala" indicating that 2% of women in Uganda die from causes of maternity with a rate of 336 maternal deaths per 1000 live births.

== Personal life ==
Alaleit is a wife and a mother to four children.
