= Michael Kawooya (physician) =

Ugandan physician

- Born: 1958 (age 67–68); Uganda
- Citizenship: Uganda
- Education: Makerere University (Bachelor of Medicine and Bachelor of Surgery) (Master of Medicine in Radiology) (Doctor of Philosophy); University of Tübingen (Fellowship in Radiology); Thomas Jefferson University (Fellowship in Ultrasound); European Society of Radiology (Honorary Member); American Institute of Ultrasound in Medicine (Honorary Fellow)
- Occupations: Physician, Radiologist, Researcher and Academic
- Years active: 1990 — present
- Title: 1. Director of ECUREI and 2. Professor emeritus of at Department of Radiology, Makerere University College of Health Sciences
- Spouse: (Mrs Kawooya)

Michael Grace Kawooya (born 1958) is a Ugandan physician, academic, researcher and academic administrator, who serves as Director at the Ernest Cook Ultrasound Research and Education Institute (ECUREI). He is a Professor (emeritus) of Radiology at Makerere University College of Health Sciences.

== Background and education ==
He was born in the Buganda Region of Uganda circa 1958. After attending local elementary and secondary schools, he was admitted to Makerere University Medical School in 1978.

He graduated with a Bachelor of Medicine and Bachelor of Surgery degree, in 1983. He went on to obtain a Master of Medicine degree in Radiology from the same university, in 1988.

He followed that with a two-year fellowship in radiology from the University of Tübingen in Tübingen, Germany. In 2001, he studied at the Thomas Jefferson University, in Philadelphia, Pennsylvania, United States in a fellowship in ultrasound.

== Career ==
He started his teaching career in the Department of Radiology at Makerere University Medical School, as a lecturer to undergraduate and postgraduate students. Over the years he was promoted and given more responsibilities, as his experience increased and broadened. He has supervised over forty radiologists at the Master of Medicine level and above. He attained full professorship in radiology at Makerere University.

Professor Kawooya’s area of super-specialization is ultrasound. He has in excess of fifty-five published articles in peer-reviewed journals, and five chapters in books on different topics, including imaging of tropical diseases. He has many professional awards including as an Honorary Fellow of the American Institute of Ultrasound in Medicine, awarded in 2015, and as an Honorary Member of the European Society of Radiology, awarded in 2019.

== Other considerations ==
In 2002, with the support of Thomas Jefferson University, in Philadelphia, Pennsylvania, United States, Professor Kawooya, with other Ugandan radiologists, founded the Ernest Cook Ultrasound Research And Education Institute (ECUREI), based at Mengo Hospital, in Kampala, Uganda's capital city.

ECUREI, which also receives partial funding from the Fontys University of Applied Sciences, in the Netherlands trains students for the Diploma in Ultrasound qualification. Trainees come from Uganda, Kenya, Tanzania, the Democratic Republic of the Congo and Zambia.

== See also ==
- Makerere University
- Mulago National Referral Hospital
