= Evelyn Nabunya =

Ugandan gynecologist

- Born: 1968 (age 57–58); Uganda
- Education: University of Dar es Salaam; Makerere University
- Occupations: Physician; Obstetrician; Gynecologist; Academic; Medical Administrator
- Years active: 1994–present
- Known for: Obstetrics & Gynecology, Leadership
- Title: Executive Director of Mulago Women's Referral Hospital

Evelyn Christine Nabunya is a senior consultant obstetrician and gynecologist in the Uganda Ministry of Health, who serves as the executive director of the 450-bed Mulago Women's and Neonatal Referral Hospital. She was appointed to that position on 9 August 2018.

== Background and education ==
She was born in the Buganda Region of Uganda circa 1968. After attending local schools, she was admitted to the University of Dar es Salaam, where she studied human medicine. She graduated with a Doctor of Medicine (MD) degree in 1993. Five years later, he was awarded a postgraduate Master of Medicine (MMed) degree in Obstetrics and Gynecology, by Makerere University, in Kampala, Uganda's capital, and largest city.

== Career ==
Nabunya is a senior consultant obstetrician and gynaecologist at Mulago National Referral Hospital, reported to have the busiest labour ward in the world, with over 30,000 live births annually, averaging 32,654 annually in the three years from 1 January 2011 until 31 December 2013. This is an average of approximately 90 deliveries every day, or 3.7 births per hour, including about 20 to 25 daily Caesarean sections.

By 2018, Dr. Nabunya had risen to the rank of Senior Consultant, and served as the Clinical Head of the Directorate of Obstetrics and Gynecology at Mulago National Referral Hospital Complex.

In August 2018, the Uganda Ministry of Health, appointed Evelyn Nabunya MD, MMed (Obs & Gyn), as the interim executive director of the new Mulago Specialised Maternal and Neonatal Hospital. She is deputized by Dr. Jolly Kaharuza Nankunda, a consultant paediatrician.

== See also ==
- Makerere University School of Medicine
- Mulago National Referral Hospital
