= Damalie Nakanjako =

Ugandan medical researcher, academic and academic administrator

- Born: Uganda
- Education: Makerere University (Bachelor of Medicine and Bachelor of Surgery) (Master of Medicine in Internal Medicine); University of Antwerp (Doctor of Philosophy
- Occupations: Physician; Internist; Immunologist; Infectious Diseases Consultant; Academic
- Years active: 2000–present
- Known for: Academics and Research
- Title: Principal and Professor of Medicine at Makerere University College of Health Sciences

Damalie Nakanjako, (born 1974) is a Ugandan specialist physician, internist, immunologist, infectious diseases consultant, academic and researcher, who serves as the Principal and Professor of Medicine at Makerere University College of Health Sciences. Immediately prior to her present position, she served as Dean of Makerere University School of Medicine, from 2019 until 17 February 2021.

== Background and education ==
She was born in the Buganda Region of Uganda in the 1970s. After attending Maryhill High School and later Gayaza High School, she was admitted to Makerere University, where she studied human medicine. She graduated with a Bachelor of Medicine and Bachelor of Surgery (MBChB) degree in 1999. She followed that with a Master of Medicine (MMed) degree in Internal Medicine, also from Makerere University. Her third degree was a Doctor of Philosophy (PhD) in Biomedical Science, obtained from the University of Antwerp, in Belgium, in 2010. According to her online curriculum vitae, she spent the years between 2011 and 2013 at the Infectious Diseases Institute, working as a postdoctoral fellow and at Uganda Virus Research Institute, working as a research scholar.

== Career ==
Nakanjako interned at Mulago Hospital in Internal Medicine and Obstetrics and Genecology, from 1998 until 1999. She spent another year at the same hospital as a medical officer. She then spent two years as a specialist medical officer at the CDC field station in Tororo, Uganda. In 2002, she returned to Mulago to pursue her master's degree.

After her MMed studies she focused on clinical research in HIV/AIDS and she started lecturing in internal medicine at Makerere in 2007. Following her PhD studies, the Wellcome Trust awarded her a scholarship to undertake a postdoctoral fellowship at Makerere, based at the Infectious Diseases Institute of the university.

Makerere University appointed Nakanjako as associate professor of medicine in 2013, serving in that capacity for five years. In 2018, she made full Professor. She is the scientific Director of the Translational laboratory at the Infectious Diseases Institute, Makerere University College of Health Sciences. Professor Nakanjako is the Director of the ADAPT Africa One Health Network with Seven countries in sub-Saharan Africa and Germany https://adaptonehealth.net/our-team/#uganda and she leads the Africa-Europe Cluster of Excellence in Infection Immunity and Inflammation Research https://www.the-guild.eu/africa-europe-core/Translational%20Research-in-Infection-Immunity-an-Inflammation.html. Professor Damalie Nakanjako is a recipient of the 2022 TWAS-Abdool Karim Award in Biological Sciences, in recognition of her achievements in biological sciences. The award recognizes women scientists from low-income African countries

== Other considerations ==
Professor Nakanjako has authored or co-written over 100 peer-reviewed articles, in the areas of her medical expertise in different medical journals. Some of them include; Effects of HIV infection and ART on phenotype and function of circulating monocytes, natural killer, and innate lymphoid cells. Access to HIV/AIDS care for mothers and children in sub-Saharan Africa: adherence to the postnatal PMTCT program. Diversity of vaginal microbiota in sub-Saharan Africa and its effects on HIV transmission and prevention. Subclinical Atherosclerosis among HIV-Infected Adults Attending HIV/AIDS Care at Two Large Ambulatory HIV Clinics in Uganda. Low HIV viral suppression rates following the intensive adherence counseling (IAC) program for children and adolescents with viral failure in public health facilities in Uganda. Acceptance of routine testing for HIV among adult patients at the medical emergency unit at a National Referral Hospital in Kampala, Uganda. High T-cell immune activation and immune exhaustion among individuals with suboptimal CD4 recovery after 4 years of antiretroviral therapy in an African cohort. Use of RDTs to improve malaria diagnosis and fever case management at primary health care facilities in Uganda. Effect of co-trimoxazole prophylaxis on morbidity, mortality, CD4-cell count, and viral load in HIV infection in rural Uganda. Mentorship needs at academic institutions in resource-limited settings: a survey at makerere university college of health sciences. Atorvastatin reduces T-cell activation and exhaustion among HIV-infected cART-treated suboptimal immune responders in Uganda: a randomised crossover placebo-controlled trial. Challenges faced by caregivers of virally non-suppressed children on the intensive adherence counselling program in Uganda: a qualitative study. Predictors and outcomes of mycobacteremia among HIV-infected smear- negative presumptive tuberculosis patients in Uganda. Acceptability and predictors of uptake of Anti-retroviral Pre-exposure Prophylaxis (PrEP) among fishing communities in Uganda: A cross-sectional discrete choice experiment survey. Frequency and impact of suboptimal immune recovery on first-line antiretroviral therapy within the International Epidemiologic Databases to evaluate AIDS in East Africa. and Strategies for retention of heterosexual men in HIV care in sub-Saharan Africa: A systematic review.

== See also ==
- Makerere University School of Medicine
