= Jolly Nankunda =

Ugandan pediatrician

- Born: 1959 (age 66–67); Mbarara District, Uganda
- Education: Bweranyangi Girls' Senior Secondary School; Gayaza High School; Makerere University; University of Bergen
- Occupations: Physician; Pediatrician; Academic; Medical Administrator
- Years active: 1988–present
- Known for: Pediatrics, Leadership
- Title: Deputy Executive Director of Mulago Women's & Neonatal Referral Hospital

Jolly Kaharuza Nankunda (born 1959) is a consultant pediatrician in the Uganda Ministry of Health, who serves as the Deputy Executive Director of the 450-bed Mulago Women's and Neonatal Referral Hospital. She was appointed to that position on 9 August 2018.

== Background and education ==
She was born in 1959, in Kinoni Village, Rwampara sub-county, Mbarara District, to Mary Kabarungi and John Kafaari. After attending local elementary school, she attended Bweranyangi Girls' Senior Secondary School in Bushenyi District, for her O-Level education. In 1977, she was admitted to Gayaza High School, a prestigious all-girls boarding secondary school, in Wakiso District, where she completed her A-Level studies.

She was admitted to Makerere University, to study human medicine. She graduated with a Bachelor of Medicine and Bachelor of Surgery (MBChB) degree in 1987. Later, in 1996, she was awarded a postgraduate Master of Medicine (MMed) degree in Pediatrics, also by Makerere University, in Kampala, Uganda's capital, and largest city. In 2012, she graduated with a Doctor of Philosophy degree in Pediatrics, from the University of Bergen, in Norway.

== Career ==
Dr Nankunda a consultant pediatrician at Mulago National Referral Hospital, reported to have the busiest labor ward in the world, with over 30,000 live births annually, averaging 32,654 annually in the three years from 1 January 2011 until 31 December 2013. This is an average of approximately 90 deliveries every day, or 3.7 births per hour, including about 20 to 25 daily Caesarean sections.

In August 2018, the Uganda Ministry of Health, appointed Jolly Kaharuza Nankunda MBChB, MMed (Peds), PhD, as the interim deputy executive director of the new Mulago Specialised Maternal and Neonatal Hospital. She will deputize Dr. Evelyn Christine Nabunya, a senior consultant obstetrician and gynecologist.

== See also ==
- Makerere University School of Medicine
- Mulago National Referral Hospital
