= Makerere University School of Dentistry =

Dental school in Uganda

- Type: Public
- Established: 1983; 43 years ago
- Affiliations: Makerere University
- Dean: Louis Muwazi
- Students: ~150 (2024)
- Undergraduates: ~100
- Location: Makerere Hill, Kampala, Uganda; 00°20′09″N 32°34′16″E
- Campus: Urban
- Location in Kampala

The Makerere University School of Dentistry (MUSD), also known as the Makerere University Dental School, is the school of dentistry of Makerere University, Uganda's oldest and largest public university. The dental school has been part of Makerere University since 1983.

== Location ==
The school is located on Makerere Hill, on the main campus of Makerere University, in northern Kampala, Uganda's capital and largest city. The campus is approximately 3 kilometres (1.9 mi), north of the city's central business district. The pre-clinical disciplines of the dental school are integrated with the Makerere University School of Medicine. The clinical teaching disciplines are integrated with the Makerere University School of Health Sciences, all of which are located on neighboring Mulago Hill.

== Overview ==
MUSD is one of the schools that comprise the Makerere University College of Health Sciences, a constituent semi-autonomous college of Makerere University. The college is headed by a principal and a deputy principal, while each school is headed by a dean.

== History ==
The school was established as a dental department, sometime in 1983. Initially it shared premises with the Ugandan Ministry of Health's Uganda Allied Health Sciences and Management Institute, located on Mulago Hill. In 2019, the dental facilities at Mulago Hill were determined to be inadequate.

The dental school was allocated new facilities on Makerere University Main Campus and a new lecture block was constructed at the site. New dental chairs were procured and new lecturers were hired. Between 2019 and 2022, the dental department was closed down while the changes were implemented. The dental school opened at the new premises on 17 May 2022.

== Academic courses ==
Undergraduate

The following undergraduate courses were offered As of July 2022:

- Bachelor of Dental Surgery (BDS)
- Bachelor of Dental Technology (BDTech)

Postgraduate

- MMed in Oral and Maxillofacial Surgery (MMed OMFS) (In collaboration with Makerere University School of Medicine)
- Master of Dental Surgery (MDS)

== See also ==
- Education in Uganda
