= Upper Mulago Regional Referral Hospital =

Coordinates: 00°20′27″N 32°34′33″E

- Uganda Ministry of Health

Geography
- Location: Mulago, Kampala, Central Region, Uganda

Organisation
- Care system: Public
- Type: General & referral

Services
- Emergency department: II
- Beds: 600

History
- Opened: 1913

Links
- Other links: Hospitals in Uganda

Upper Mulago Regional Referral Hospital, also known as Old Mulago Regional Referral Hospital, is a planned hospital in Uganda. When established, it is expected to serve as the regional referral hospital for the Kampala Metropolitan Area, which includes the capital city of Kampala (2014 population: 1,507,080) and the surrounding Wakiso District (2014 pop: 1,997,418).

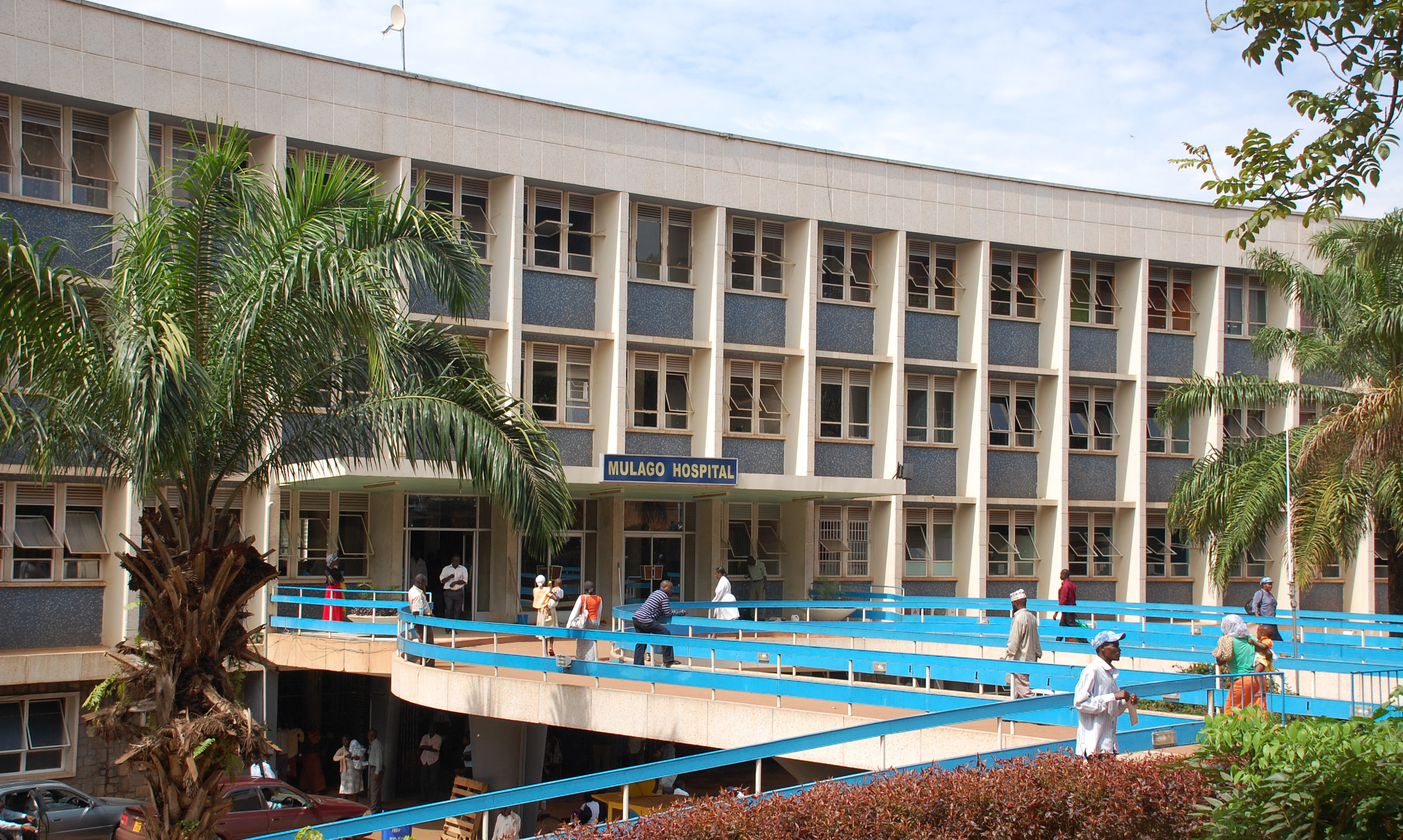
Mulago Hospital

== Location ==
Upper Mulago Hospital or Old Mulago Hospital is located on Mulago Hill, immediately north and north-east of the newly reconfigured Mulago National Referral Hospital, about 5 kilometres (3 mi) north of the central business district of Kampala. The coordinates of Upper Mulago are 0°20'27.0"N, 32°34'33.0"E (Latitude:0.340835; Longitude:32.575823).

== Overview ==
Old Mulago Hospital was established in 1913. New Mulago Hospital or Lower Mulago Hospital was established in 1962. Together they form the "Mulago Hospital Complex" with 1,790 beds serving as the national referral hospital and the teaching hospital of the Makerere University College of Health Sciences. Lower Mulago is undergoing upgrades and renovation to make it a truly tertiary referral and teaching institution. What is planned is to upgrade Lower Mulago to a 900-bed facility, including a 400-bed Mulago Women's and Neonatal Referral Hospital. Upper Mulago will then be transformed into a 600-bed, regional referral hospital for the Kampala metropolitan area, which lacks a hospital in that category.

== Target population ==
The hospital is intended to serve as a regional referral hospital for the population in the Kampala Metropolitan Area, as part of the "Improvement of Health Services At Mulago National Referral Hospital And The City Of Kampala", funded by the African Development Bank.

== See also ==
- List of hospitals in Uganda
- Naguru General Hospital
- Kawempe General Hospital
- Kiruddu General Hospital
