= Anthony Kabanza Mbonye =

- Died: 25 July 2021; Buziga, Kampala, Uganda
- Citizenship: Ugandan
- Education: Ntare School; Makerere University (MBChB); University of Liverpool (MPH); Makerere University (MA in Demography); University of Copenhagen (PhD)
- Occupations: Physician; Public health specialist; Researcher; Academic
- Known for: Acting Director-General of Health Services at the Ministry of Health of Uganda
- Spouse: Lucy Nakyobe Mbonye

Anthony Kabanza Mbonye was a Ugandan physician, public health specialist, researcher and academic who served as Acting Director-General of Health Services at the Ministry of Health of Uganda.

== Early life and education background ==
Mbonye was born in Rwenkobwa in Ibanda District, western Uganda. He studied at Ntare School for his secondary education before joining Makerere University, where he obtained a Bachelor of Medicine and Bachelor of Surgery degree in 1986.

In 1994, he obtained a Master of Public Health from the University of Liverpool in the United Kingdom, before obtaining a Master of Arts in demography from Makerere University in 1995. He later obtained a PhD from the University of Copenhagen in Denmark in 2006 and in 2017, he became a Fellow of the Royal College of Physicians in the United Kingdom in public health.

== Career ==
Mbonye joined started his career after completing his medical training by serving as a teaching assistant in the department of pharmacology. He later worked as a doctor at Entebbe Grade B hospital before he was promoted to the rank of senior medical officer.

In addition, he served as the Assistant Commissioner of Health Services for Reproductive Health from 2002 to 2008 and from 2008, he served as Commissioner of Health Services and Head of the Department of Community Health.

In June 2016, Mbonye was appointed Acting Director-General of Health Services in the Ministry of Health. Alongside his public service career, Mbonye worked in academia in away that he taught at Makerere University's School of Public Health from the 1990s and later became a professor at the College of Health Sciences. He also taught at Uganda Christian University.

== Publications ==
Mbonye also wrote books like Uganda's Health Sector Through Turbulent Politics (1958–2018) and The History of Rwenkobwa Town. He also authored an article titled “The dilemma of pursuing a double career”.

== Death ==
Mbonye was married to Lucy Nakyobe Mbonye. He died on 25 July 2021 after battling gastric and peritoneal cancer. He died at his home in Buziga, in Kampala.

== See also ==
- Anne Atai Omoruto
- Moses Kamya
- William Bazeyo
- Fred Wabwire-Mangen
