= Sebastian Kyalwazi =

Ugandan surgeon, researcher and academic (1920 - 1992)

- Born: 30 October 1920; Masaka, Masaka District, Uganda
- Died: January 25, 1992 (aged 71); London, United Kingdom
- Education: St. Mary's College Kisubi (High School Diploma); Makerere University (Bachelor of Medicine and Bachelor of Surgery); Royal College of Surgeons of Edinburgh (Fellow of the Royal College of Surgeons of Edinburgh)
- Occupations: Surgeon, academic, academic administrator
- Years active: 1961–1992
- Known for: Surgical skills and Academics
- Title: Former Professor and Head of Surgery; Makerere University School of Medicine & Mulago National Referral Hospital

Sebastian Kakule Kyalwazi (20 October 1920 – 25 January 1992) was a Ugandan consultant surgeon who served as professor and head of surgery at Makerere University School of Medicine and concurrently as senior consultant surgeon at Mulago National Referral Hospital from the early 1970s until his death in the early 1990s. He is reported to be the first indigenous African to qualify as a surgeon in East and Central Africa.

== Early life and education ==
Kyalwazi was born in Masaka District, in the Buganda Region of Uganda, where he was raised as a Roman Catholic.

After primary school in Kampala and Masaka, he studied at St. Mary's College Kisubi, where he obtained both his GCE Ordinary Level and GCE Advanced Level certificates.

In 1948, he graduated from Makerere University (at that time a constituent college of the University of London), with a Bachelor of Medicine and Bachelor of Surgery (MBChB) degree. Later he undertook postgraduate studies in Edinburgh, Scotland, graduating as a Fellow of the Royal College of Surgeons of Edinburgh, being the first African in East and Central Africa to qualify as a surgeon. In 1968, he spent a period of study at the Masaryk Memorial Cancer Institute (Czechoslovakia Cancer Institute) on a World Health Organization, scholarship.

== Career ==
Kyalwazi was appointed as a lecturer in surgery at Makerere University Medical School in 1968. He rose through the ranks and became Professor and Head of the Department of Surgery at the medical school and the university's teaching hospital, the first African to attain that rank.

He took interest in research and surgery of a number of solid cancer illnesses, including hepatocellular carcinoma, penile cancer, Kaposi's sarcoma and cervical cancer among others. At the time that Uganda Cancer Institute (UCI) was established in 1967, Kyalwazi was the lead negotiator on the Ugandan side and is credited for allowing UCI to be established. In 1968, he was elected as the president of the Association of Surgeons of East Africa, the first African to serve in that position.

== Other considerations ==
He was appointed lead surgeon on the medical team selected to treat Pope Paul VI on the pontiff's visit to Uganda in 1969, if the need arose. Kyalwazi served as the president of the Rotary Club of Kampala in the late 1970s.

== Honors and awards ==
The Catholic Church awarded Kyalwazi the Order of St. Gregory the Great, in recognition of his service to the Church and to humanity. The Association of Surgeons of Uganda created an annual memorial lecture in memory of Kyalwazi's contribution to healthcare and social development in Uganda.

== Personal life ==
He died on 25 January 1992 in a London hospital from pancreatic cancer at age 71. He was awarded a state funeral by the government of Uganda.

== See also ==
- Uganda Cancer Institute
- Charles Olweny
- Francis Miiro
- Jovan Kiryabwire
