= John Baptist Mukasa =

Ugandan neurosurgeon (1967-2021

- Born: 1 January 1967; Kawolo Hospital, Uganda
- Died: 29 June 2021 (aged 54); Mulago National Referral Hospital
- Citizenship: Uganda
- Education: Lugansk State Medical University; Huazhong University of Science and Technology
- Occupation: Neurosurgeon
- Years active: 2007–2021
- Title: Consultant neurosurgeon at Mulago National Referral Hospital

John Baptist Nsubuga Mukasa (January 1967 – June 2021) was a Ugandan neurosurgeon who served as a consultant neurosurgeon at Mulago National Referral Hospital in the Uganda capital Kampala. He concurrently served as a senior lecturer in the Department of Neurosurgery at the nearby Makerere University School of Medicine.

He died in Kampala, from complications of COVID-19 infection on 29 June 2021.

== Background and education ==
Mukasa was born c. 1967 in the Central Region of Uganda. After attending local primary and secondary schools, he was awarded a scholarship to study human medicine at Luhansk State Medical University, in Ukraine, graduating with a medical degree.

Later, he went to the Huazhong University of Science and Technology, Wuhan, Hubei, China, where he specialized as a neurosurgeon. His areas of sub-specialization included neurotrauma (brain and spinal cord), pediatric neurosurgery and spinal cord surgery.

== Career ==
At the time of his death, Mukasa was one of only 13 neurosurgeons in Uganda, whose national population was estimated at 47 million. He is remembered fondly by his colleagues, co-workers, neurosurgeons, residents, medical students whom he taught and mentored, and the many patients he operated on and went out of his way to assist. These include Juliet Sekabunga Nalwanga, Uganda's first female neurosurgeon, who was trained by Mukasa.

Mukasa also had operating privileges at UMC Victoria Hospital in Bukoto, in the northern part of Kampala, Uganda's capital city.

== Personal life ==
Mukasa is survived by a widow and two sons.
