= Juliet Sekabunga Nalwanga =

Ugandan neurosurgeon

- Born: 29 January 1983 (age 43); Uganda
- Citizenship: Uganda
- Education: Mbarara University (Bachelor of Medicine and Bachelor of Surgery) (Master of Medicine in Surgery); Makerere University (Residency Program in Neurosurgery); University of Toronto (Fellowship in Pediatric Neurosurgery)
- Occupation: Pediatric neurosurgeon
- Years active: 2019–present
- Title: Consultant pediatric neurosurgeon
- Spouse: Kenneth Male

Juliet Sekabunga Nalwanga is a paediatric neurosurgeon from Uganda, who is the country's first female neurosurgeon. As of 2021, she was one of only thirteen neurosurgeons in Uganda. As of 2018, she was employed by Mulago National Referral Hospital in Kampala.

== Background and education ==
Nalwanga's father is the late Professor Sekabunga, a well-known pediatric surgeon, who practiced at Mulago National Referral Hospital in the 1970s and 1980s. She also had a maternal aunt who was a physician. She credits that aunt for paying her school fees and being the inspiration to pursue medicine as a career.

Nalwanga went on to study medicine at Mbarara University, followed by internships at the same institution, and at Lira Regional Referral Hospital. She returned to Mbarara University to pursue a Master of Medicine degree in Surgery, the first woman to do so. She was then admitted to Makerere University to pursue a neurosurgical residency at Mulago National Referral Hospital, graduating in 2018. She then spent a year specialising in paediatric neurosurgery at The Hospital for Sick Children, the teaching hospital of the University of Toronto Faculty of Medicine, in Toronto, Canada. One of her Ugandan mentors was the late John Baptist Mukasa (1967–2021).

== Career ==
Following the completion of her neurosurgery fellowship in Toronto, Canada, Nalwanga returned to Uganda and took up employment at Mulago National Referral Hospital as a consultant pediatric neurosurgeon and as an assistant lecturer in neurosurgery at Makerere University School of Medicine. She has also held teaching positions at Mbarara University School of Medicine. As of February 2023, Nalwanga was a member of the faculty at Uganda Christian University School of Medicine.
