= Josephine Nambooze =

Ugandan physician, public health specialist, academic

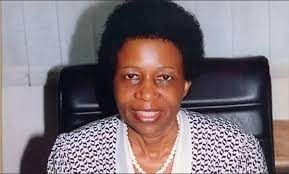
- Born: 1930 (age 95–96); Nsambya, Uganda
- Citizenship: Uganda
- Education: Makerere University (Bachelor of Medicine and Bachelor of Surgery); University of London (Diploma in Maternal and Child Health); Undisclosed University in USA (Master of Public Health)
- Occupations: Physician, researcher, academic
- Years active: 1962 to present
- Known for: Medical Practice & Research
- Title: Professor of Public Health

Josephine Nambooze (born 1930) is a Ugandan physician, public health specialist, academic, and medical researcher. She is an emeritus professor of public health at Makerere University School of Public Health. Nambooze was the first female East African to qualify as a physician circa 1959.

== Background and education ==
Nambooze was born at Nsambya, a suburb of Kampala to Joseph Lule, a school teacher, and Maria Magdalena Lule, a housewife. She was the first born in a family of thirteen children. She attended St. Joseph's Primary School Nsambya, and Mount Saint Mary's College Namagunga. While at Namagunga, she studied science subjects. There being no laboratories at the school at the time, she studied her science classes at Namilyango College, an all-boys residential high school 25.5 kilometres (16 mi) to the west of Namagunga.

During the mid-1950s, she was admitted to Makerere University School of Medicine to study human medicine, the first female in the history of the school. Following graduation from Makerere, she undertook postgraduate studies in the United Kingdom and the United States, returning to Uganda in 1962.

== Work experience ==
She joined the staff at Makerere University in 1962 as a lecturer in public health and maternal and child health. She was given the responsibility of supervising Kasangati Health Centre, a teaching facility of Makerere University School of Public Health. She later made senior lecturer, associate professor, and full professor in those fields. She has also served as the World Health Organization (WHO) representative to Botswana and as director of support for health services development at the WHO regional office in Brazzaville, Congo.

== See also ==
- Mulago Hospital
- Nsambya Hospital
- Uganda Ministry of Health
