= Jeremiah Twa-Twa =

Ugandan politician

- Born: 29 January 1951 (age 75); Uganda
- Education: Makerere University (MBChB, MA in public health); University of Nairobi (Certificate in Epidemiology)
- Occupations: Physician, politician
- Years active: 1980–present
- Known for: Public health, politics
- Title: MP for Iki-Iki County; Budaka District
- Spouse: Florence Twa-Twa

Jeremiah Mutwalante Twa-Twa (born 29 January 1951) is a Ugandan physician, public health specialist, and politician. His last name is sometimes spelled "Twatwa". He is the elected Member of Parliament representing Iki-Iki County, Budaka District since May 2011. Previously he was the director of the Division of Child Health at the Uganda Ministry of Health from 2005 until 2010.

== Background and education ==
He was born in Budaka District on 29 January 1951. Twa-Twa attended Sekulo Primary School in Budaka District from 1959 until 1964. He then studied at Mbale College in Mbale District from 1965 until 1966. He undertook his O-level studies (S1-S4) at Jinja College in Jinja District from 1967 until 1970. In 1971, he entered Namilyango College in Mukono District to pursue his A-level (S5-S6) education, graduating in 1972.

He graduated from Makerere University Medical School in 1978 with a Bachelor of Medicine and Bachelor of Surgery degree. In 1981, he obtained a Diploma in Public Health from the Makerere University School of Public Health. In 1995, he received a Master of Arts degree in demography from the same university. He also holds a Certificate in Epidemiology, awarded in 1983 by the University of Nairobi.

== Work experience ==
Twa-Twa served as the medical director of the Tororo General Hospital in Tororo from 1980 until 1983. He then served as the district medical officer for Tororo District from 1983 until 1987. From 1988 until 1995, he served as a senior medical officer of the Uganda Aids Control Programme at the headquarters of the Uganda Ministry of Health. He was registrar of the Uganda Medical and Dental Practitioners Council from 1995 until 1999. From 1999 until 2010, he was director of the School Health Programme at the headquarters of the Uganda Ministry of Health, in addition to his other responsibilities.

His first foray into national politics was in 2006, when he contested for the Iki-Iki parliamentary seat on the National Resistance Movement political party ticket. He lost during the primaries. In 2011, he won both the primary and the general election to become a member of parliament.

== Personal details ==
Jeremiah Mutwalante Twa-Twa is married to Florence Twa-Twa. Together, they are the parents of five children.

== See also ==
- Bagwere
- Makerere University College of Health Sciences
