= Makerere University School of Biomedical Sciences =

Makerere University School of Biomedical Sciences (MakSBS)
- Type: Public
- Established: 2007
- Affiliations: Makerere University
- Dean: Prof. David Patrick Kateete
- Location: Mulago Hill, Kampala, Uganda; 00°19′38″N 32°37′00″E
- Campus: Urban
- Location in Kampala

The Makerere University School of Biomedical Sciences (MakSBS) is one of the four schools that comprise the Makerere University College of Health Sciences (MakCHS), a semi-autonomous constituent college of Makerere University, Uganda's oldest university. Between 1924 and 2007, the school was part of the Makerere University School of Medicine and constituted the pre-clinical departments of anatomy, biochemistry, physiology, pharmacology, microbiology, and pathology. In 2007, those departments were organized into a separate school. MakSBS provides biomedical education at the undergraduate and postgraduate levels.

Dean: Prof. David Patrick Kateete

== Location ==
The school's campus is located on Mulago Hill, in north-east Kampala, Uganda's capital and largest city. The location is close to the other schools of the College of Health Sciences and is adjacent to the Mulago Hospital Complex, the teaching hospital of MakCHS. The coordinates of the school are: 00° 20' 17"N, 32° 34' 38"S (Latitude:0.3381, Longitude:32.5772)

== Overview ==
MakSBS is one of the schools that constitute MakCHS, a constituent semi-autonomous college of Makerere University. The schools of the college include:

- Makerere University School of Biomedical Sciences
- Makerere University School of Health Sciences
- Makerere University School of Medicine
- Makerere University School of Public Health

The college is headed by a principal and a deputy principal, while each school is headed by a dean.

== Departments ==
As of September 2009, the following departments constituted MakSBS:

- Department of Human Anatomy
- Department of Biochemistry
- Department of Medical Microbiology
- Department of Pathology
- Department of Pharmacology and Therapeutics
- Department of Physiology

== Undergraduate Courses ==
The following undergraduate courses are offered at MakSBS:

- Bachelor of Science in biomedical sciences
- Bachelor of Science in biomedical engineering
- Bachelor of Science in medical illustration
- Bachelor of Science in cytotechnology

== Graduate courses ==
The following graduate courses are offered at MakSBS:

- The East African Diploma in Tropical Medicine and Hygiene
- Master of Science in anatomy
- Master of Science in biochemistry
- Master of Science in medical illustration
- Master of Science in pharmacology
- Master of Science in physiology
- Master of Medicine in microbiology
- Master of Science in immunology and clinical microbiology
- Master of Medicine in pathology
- Doctor of Philosophy in any of the school's disciplines

== See also ==
- Education in Uganda
- Makerere University College of Health Sciences
