= Moses Kamya =

Ugandan physician and academic

Moses R Kamya
- Born: 1960 (age 65–66); Uganda
- Citizenship: Uganda
- Education: Makerere University (Bachelor of Medicine and Bachelor of Surgery) (MMed in Internal Medicine); University of California, Berkeley (Master of Public Health); University of Antwerp (PhD in Biomedical Sciences)
- Occupations: Physician and academic
- Years active: 1988–present
- Title: Professor and chair, Department Medicine, Makerere University

Moses R Kamya is a Ugandan physician, academic, researcher, and academic administrator, who serves as professor and chair of the Department of Medicine, Makerere University School of Medicine, a component of Makerere University College of Health Sciences.

== Background and education ==
Kamya was admitted to Makerere University School of Medicine in 1980, graduating in 1985 with a Bachelor of Medicine and Bachelor of Surgery. In 1988, he returned to the institution to study for the Master of Medicine (MMed) program. He graduated in 1991 with an MMed in Internal Medicine. He also holds a Master of Public Health in Epidemiology, awarded in 1995, by the University of California, Berkeley School of Public Health. His PhD in Biomedical Sciences was awarded by the University of Antwerp in 2007.

== Career ==
Kamya's research and teaching in infectious diseases spans a period in excess of 20 years. He has special interest in the interaction between malaria and HIV/AIDS. He serves as professor and chair (head) of the Department of Medicine at Makerere University College of Health Sciences. He is also a key researcher and case manager in AIDS care at Mulago National Referral Hospital, the teaching hospital of the university, and at the adjacent Makerere University Infectious Diseases Institute.

His research spans HIV, malaria, tuberculosis, and STDs. He trains medical students and residents in the design and execution of infectious diseases research. He also serves as editor of the Uganda antiretroviral therapy (ART) clinical guidelines. He is also the chair of the Uganda Ministry of Health adult ART management committee. He has published widely in peer journals, and has contributed to several books.

== Researcher ==
As an academic as well as a medical researcher, Kamya has participated in research studies which has been published in respectable academic and scientific journals. These include:

- Outcomes of cryptococcal meningitis in Uganda before and after the availability of highly active antiretroviral therapy. This study found significant cryptococcal meningitis associated mortality persists, despite the administration of amphotericin B and HIV therapy.
- Cost-effectiveness of serum cryptococcal antigen screening to prevent deaths among HIV-infected persons with a CD4^{+} cell count ≤100 cells/μL who start HIV therapy in resource-limited settings.
- HIV testing and treatment with the use of a community health approach in rural Africa.
- Predictors of long-term viral failure among Ugandan children and adults treated with antiretroviral therapy.
- Malaria in Uganda: challenges to control on the long road to elimination: I. Epidemiology and current control efforts.
- Dihydroartemisinin–piperaquine for the prevention of Malaria in pregnancy.
- Estimating the annual entomological inoculation rate for Plasmodium falciparum transmitted by Anopheles gambiae s.l. using three sampling methods in three sites in Uganda. This study concluded that light traps provide an alternative method for sampling indoor-resting mosquitoes to human-landing catches and have the advantage that they protect individuals from being bitten during collection, are easy to use and are not subject to collector bias.
- Changing Prevalence of Potential Mediators of Aminoquinoline, Antifolate, and Artemisinin Resistance Across Uganda.
- Novel serologic biomarkers provide accurate estimates of recent Plasmodium falciparum exposure for individuals and communities. Factors determining the heterogeneity of Malaria incidence in children in Kampala, Uganda.
- Artemether-Lumefantrine versus Dihydroartemisinin-Piperaquine for treatment of malaria: A randomized trial.
- COVID-19: Shining the Light on Africa.
- Sources of persistent malaria transmission in a setting with effective malaria control in eastern Uganda: a longitudinal, observational cohort study.
- Malaria transmission, infection, and disease at three sites with varied transmission intensity in Uganda: implications for malaria control.

== See also ==
- Uganda AIDS Commission
