= Makerere University School of Health Sciences =

Health sciences university in Africa

Coordinates: 00°20′17″N 32°34′34″E

Makerere University College of Health Sciences
- Type: Public
- Established: 2007
- Affiliations: Makerere University
- Principal: Professor
- Location: Mulago Hill, Kampala, Uganda
- Campus: Urban

Makerere University College of Health Sciences (MakCHS) is one of the 10 colleges that constitute Makerere University, East Africa's oldest university. The college was established in 2007 by consolidating the training offered by the University in the disciplines of Medicine, Dentistry, Pharmacy, Nursing, Public Health, Optometry, Radiography and other health sciences. The College of Health Sciences consists of 5 schools: School of Medicine, School of Public Health, School of Biomedical Sciences, School of Dentistry and School og Health Sciences. The college provides training in the health sciences at the undergraduate, masters, PhD and post-doctoral levels.

== Location ==
The school's campus is located on Mulago Hill between the new and old mulago, in northeast Kampala, Uganda's capital and largest city. The location is adjacent to Mulago Hospital Complex, the teaching hospital of Makerere University. The coordinates of the school are: 00° 20' 17"N, 32° 34' 34"S (Latitude:0.3380, Longitude:32.5760)

== Overview ==
Makerere University College of Health Sciences ( MakCHS) is one of the 10 colleges that constitute Makerere University. The schools of the college include:

- Makerere University School of Biomedical Sciences
- Makerere University School of Health Sciences
- Makerere University School of Medicine
- Makerere University School of Public Health
- Makerere University School of Dentistry

The College is headed by a Principal and a Deputy Principal, while each School is headed by a Dean.

== Departments ==
Makerere University College of Health Sciences has 30 Departments

- Department of Anaesthesia
- Department of Family Medicine
- Department of Internal Medicine
- Department of Surgery
- Department of Paediatrics
- Department of Radiology and Radiotherapy
- Department of Ear, Nose and Throat
- Department of Orthopedic Surgery
- Department of Ophthalmology
- Department of Psychiatry
- Department of Anatomy
- Department of Physiology
- Department of Biochemistry
- Department of Pharmacology
- Department of Pathology
- Department of Medical Microbiology
- Department of Immunology and Molecular Biology
- Department of Medical Illustration
- Department of Pharmacy
- Department of Dentistry
- Department of Nursing
- Department of Allied Health Sciences (Radiology, Physical Therapy, Occupational Therapy, Medical Laboratory Technology)

== Undergraduate Courses ==
The following undergraduate courses are offered at Makerere University School of Health Sciences:

- Diploma in Dentistry
- Diploma in Medical Laboratory Technology
- Diploma in Midwifery
- Diploma in Nursing
- Diploma in Radiology
- Diploma in Physiotherapy
- Diploma in Pharmacy
- Bachelor of Science in Nursing (BSN)
- Bachelor of Pharmacy (BPharm)
- Bachelor of Dental Surgery (BDS)
- Bachelor of Science (BSc) in Occupational Therapy
- Bachelor of Science (BSc) in Physiotherapy

== Graduate Courses ==
The following postgraduate courses are offered at Makerere University School of Health Sciences:

- Master of Science (MSc) in Occupational Therapy
- Master of Science (MSc) in Physical Therapy
- Master of Science in Nursing (MSN)
- Master of Dental Surgery (MDS)
- Master of Pharmacy (MPharm)
- Doctor of Philosophy (PhD)

== See also ==
- Education in Uganda
- Makerere University
- Makerere University College of Health Sciences
- Makerere University School of Biomedical Sciences
- Makerere University School of Medicine
- Makerere University School of Public Health
