= Francis Miiro =

Ugandan obstetrician and gynaecologist, researcher and academic (1934 - 2008)

- Born: 2 August 1934; Masaka, Masaka District, Uganda
- Died: 28 March 2008 (aged 73); Kampala, Uganda
- Education: University of Mumbai (Bachelor of Medicine and Bachelor of Surgery); Queen's University Belfast (Member of the Royal College of Obstetricians and Gynaecologists); Makerere University (Doctor of Philosophy)
- Occupations: Obstetrician and Gynaecologist, researcher, academic
- Years active: 1968–2008
- Known for: Academics and Research
- Title: Former Professor of Obstetrics and Gynecology at Makerere University School of Medicine and Former Senior Consultant Obstetrician and Gynecologist at Mulago National Referral Hospital
- Spouse: Sarah Wanyana Miiro (m. 3 August 1969)

Francis A. Miiro, (2 August 1934 – 30 March 2008), was a consultant obstetrician and gynecologist in Uganda, who served as Professor of Obstetrics and Gynecology at Makerere University School of Medicine and concurrently as senior consultant obstetrician and gynecologists at Mulago National Referral Hospital, the teaching hospital of the medical school.

== Background and education ==
Miiro was born in the Buganda Region of Uganda, on 2 August 1934. He was raised as a Roman Catholic. His parents were the late Maria Nakiwala Nakayima and the late Petero Nsubuga.

He attended Kiziba Primary School for his elementary studies. He then transferred to St. Peter's Boys School, Nsambya where he completed his junior school education (middle school). He then attended Namilyango College where he completed both his O-Level and A-Level studies.

In 1963, he graduated from Mumbai University (at that time the University of Bombay), where he had studied human medicine on scholarship. He obtained a Bachelor of Medicine and Bachelor of Surgery (MBChB) degree from there. Later he undertook postgraduate studies at Queen's University Belfast, in Belfast, Northern Ireland, where he obtained the title of Member of the Royal College of the Royal College of Obstetricians and Gynaecologists (MRCOG) in 1968. In 1975, Makerere University awarded him the degree of Doctor of Philosophy (PhD).

== Career ==
He was appointed as a lecturer in obstetrics and gynaecology at Makerere University Medical School in 1968. He rose through the ranks and became professor in the department of obstetrics and gynaecology at the medical school and senior consultant obstetrician and gynaecologist the medical school's teaching hospital.

In the 1990s and early 2000s, he was the lead investigator in clinical trials where Makerere University was a study centre. The studies established the efficacy of Nevirapine in preventing maternal-newborn transmission of HIV. Miiro and his colleagues were able to demonstrate a 50 percent reduction in perinatal transmission to children born to HIV positive mothers, when the mothers are given a single dose of Nevirapine during labour.

== Illness and death ==
He died on 30 March 2008 at Mulago National Referral Hospital, from pancreatic cancer at the age of 73. He was survived by his wife and eleven adult children and eight grandchildren.

== See also ==
- Education in Uganda
- Sebastian Kyalwazi
- Ugandan Medical Schools
