= David Guwatudde =

Ugandan academic and researcher

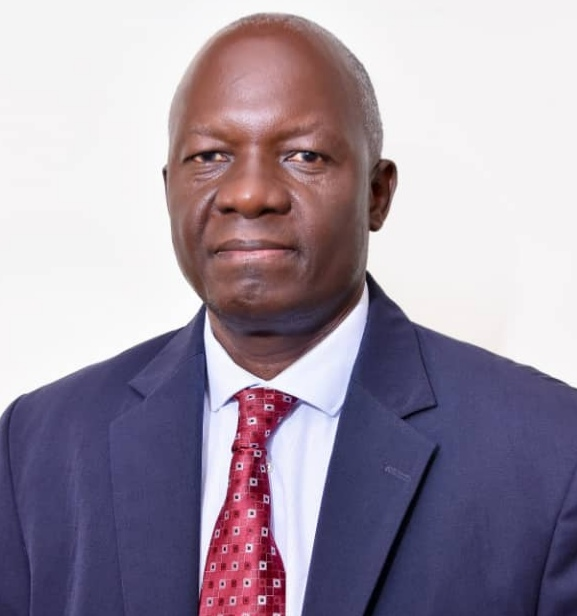
Guwatudde David

Prof David Guwatudde is a Ugandan academic and researcher. He is currently a professor of Epidemiology and Biostatistics in the Department of Epidemiology and Biostatistics at the School of Public Health, Makerere University College of Health Sciences.

== Background and education ==
He obtained his Msc in statistics from the University of Southampton, UK, and his PhD from the Case Western Reserve University, Cleveland, Ohio, USA.

== Research ==
He is a researcher whose areas of expertise include epidemiology of hypertension, epidemiology of diabetes, evaluation of effectiveness of interventions for the prevention, management and control of high burden diseases, especially non-communicable diseases, and capacity building through tertiary training. His works have been highly used with 4,361 citations, h-index of 34 and i-10 index of 41. Some of his highly cited works include; Injury patterns in rural and urban Uganda, The state of hypertension care in 44 low-income and middle-income countries: a cross-sectional study of nationally representative individual-level data from 1· 1 million adults, Tuberculosis in household contacts of infectious cases in Kampala, Uganda, The burden of hypertension in sub-Saharan Africa: a four-country cross sectional study, Citywide trauma experience in Kampala, Uganda: a call for intervention, The epidemiology of hypertension in Uganda: findings from the national non-communicable diseases risk factor survey, Prevalence factors associated with hypertension in Rukungiri district, Uganda-a community-based study, Urban malaria: primary caregivers' knowledge, attitudes, practices and predictors of malaria incidence in a cohort of Ugandan children, Health system performance for people with diabetes in 28 low-and middle-income countries: a cross-sectional study of nationally representative surveys, Diabetes and pre-diabetes among persons aged 35 to 60 years in eastern Uganda: prevalence and associated factors, Mycobacterium africanum Subtype II Is Associated with Two Distinct Genotypes and Is a Major Cause of Human Tuberculosis in Kampala, Uganda, Prevalence and correlates of diabetes mellitus in Uganda: a population‐based national survey, Diabetes diagnosis and care in sub-Saharan Africa: pooled analysis of individual data from 12 countries and Looking at non-communicable diseases in Uganda through a local lens: an analysis using locally derived data.
