= Higher Education for Development =

Educational organizations based in the United States

- Founded: 1992
- Purpose: Education, Health care, Environment, Workforce Development
- Location: Washington, D.C.
- Region served: Global
- Method: Grants
- Key people: Tully Cornick, executive director Jeanne-Marie Duval, deputy executive director
- Website: www.hedprgram.org

Higher Education for Development (HED) was an organization that worked in close partnership with the United States Agency for International Development (USAID) and operated with the advice and counsel of the six major U.S. higher education associations to support the engagement of higher education in development issues worldwide. The contract with USAID came to a close at the end of FY 2015, and HED operations ceased at that time.

== About HED ==
Higher Education for Development, which at one time was known as the Association Liaison Organization (ALO), worked from 1992 to 2015 with U.S. universities to build worldwide partnerships to address development issues internationally. HED had some 350 higher education partnerships in more than 66 countries, with grants funded by USAID and USAID Missions in varying amounts for activities of two to three years awarded via a competitive process involving a peer-review..

HED's worldwide higher education partnerships addressed all USAID sectors of agriculture, democracy and governance; economic growth and trade; education and training; and global health and the environment.

Dr. Tully Cornick led Higher Education for Development as the organization strengthened ties between U.S. and host country higher education institutions and other partners, which resulted in strong partnerships and sustainable results in developing countries. Dr. Cornick came to Higher Education for Development after extensive experience and knowledge in international development and more than two decades of experience at the USAID.

== Former HED Board ==
Terry Hartle, (Board Chair), American Council on Education

Dr. James McKenney, American Association of Community Colleges

Dr. George Mehaffy, American Association of State Colleges and Universities

Dr. John Vaughn, Association of American Universities

Ms. Maureen Budetti, National Association of Independent Colleges and Universities

Mr. Kerry Bolognese, Association of Public and Land-grant Universities (formerly National Association of State Universities and Land-Grant Colleges)

== Former HED Advisory Council ==
Dr. J. Michael Adams, President, Fairleigh Dickinson University

Dr. William Bertrand, Executive Director, Payson Center for International Development & Technology Transfer Tulane University

Dr. Jeffrey Gorrell, Professor and Dean College of Education and Human Development George Mason University

Dr. John Hudzik, Vice President, Global Engagement and Strategic Projects Michigan State University

Dr. Bobby Moser, (Chair), Vice President for Agricultural Administration and Dean, College of Food Agriculture and Environmental Sciences The Ohio State University

Dr. Nicolas van de Walle, Associate Dean of International Studies, Cornell University

Dr. John Welty, President, California State University-Fresno

Dr. Carolyn Williams, President, Bronx Community College

Dr. Handy Williamson, Jr., Vice Provost for International Programs University of Missouri

== Former Higher Education Partnerships ==
HED offered higher education institutions opportunities to compete for higher education partnerships on a variety of issues. These institutions included Historically Black Colleges and Universities (HBCUs), minority-serving institutions, and community colleges. The resources and diversity of higher education institutions in the United States made them good partners for many universities abroad.

President Barack Obama on July 14, 2009 spoke about increasing support for community colleges at a Macomb Community College, an HED partnering institution. The Macomb Community College and Instituto Federal de Ciência e Tecnologia-Amazonas partnership was one of HED's 34 community college partnerships.

== Former HED Programs ==
Some examples of program areas include LIPHEA, The Africa-U.S. Initiative and TIES, MEPI, CEPI.

- USAID/Haiti Associate Award
- USAID/Egypt EMBA Associate Award
- USAID/Jordan Strengthening Early Childhood Education Associate Award
- USAID/OMEP Strengthening Workforce Preparation in Algeria
- Middle East Partnership Initiative (MEPI)
- Civic Education Partnership Initiative (CEPI)

Leadership Initiative for Public Health in East Africa (LIPHEA) USAID's Bureau of Global Health, in collaboration with HED (previously ALO) made an award of $2 million in October 2005, (since increased to $5.16 million) for a partnership among the Muhimbili University College of Health Sciences (MUCHS), the Makerere University School of Public Health (MUSPH), and the Johns Hopkins University Bloomberg School of Public Health (JHU) – with additional support from Tulane University and George Washington University – titled "Leadership Initiative for Public Health in East Africa (LIPHEA): Tanzania and Uganda."

The goal of this partnership was to strengthen public health leadership in East Africa by improving the capacity of local institutions to train mid- and senior-level health professionals in leadership skills. This initiative was creating a cadre of professionally trained health leaders better able to envision, plan, implement, and manage effective responses to the health needs of Africans, especially in the areas of epidemiology, health policy and planning, public administration, budgeting, human resource management, emergency response, and applied field research.

== Former Africa-U.S. Higher Education Initiative ==
An initiative focused on African higher education was a collaborative effort linking USAID, HED, the Africa-U.S. Initiative. After launching a request for application in late 2008, HED received more than 250 application from various U.S. higher education institutions for 20 planning grants of $50,000 each. The response was so profound that USAID provided an additional 10 planning grants of the same amount. An August 2009 conference gained recognition for its goal to bring together several universities across the African continent and the United States to tackle topics like health, education and agriculture. Some of the winners of the grant included professors at Calvin College, Georgia State University, and others.

HED partnerships were proven to be sustainable and effective in their specific partnership project goals. Through these partnerships, for example, a Southeast Asia Impact Assessment Report illustrated the qualitative and quantitative results of closed partnerships. Many continue to remain active in their activities although HED funding has ended because of leveraged funds and project design.

Training, Internships, Exchanges, and Scholarships Initiative (TIES) The TIES partnerships made up a huge portion of the HED partnership portfolio. The USAID-Mexico partnership was fully engaged in the creation of the RFAs to ensure that the award competitions closely matched the needs of the Mexican people and the higher education community between the United States and Mexico. Other RFAs focused on Rule of Law, Agriculture, Health Care, Tourism and Business Development, Natural Resource Management, Biodiversity conservation, and Energy.

Bi-annual TIES conferences were held in Mexico to allow past and current Mexican partnership directors to engage with one another and discuss general issues and problem areas in the higher education community among academia and development specialists. HED produced publications in English and Spanish for these events to encourage cross-collaboration and information sharing.

Middle East Partnership Initiative (MEPI) partnerships spanned select countries within the Middle East and North Africa region. MEPI countries include: Algeria, Bahrain, Egypt, Iraq, Israel, Jordan, Kuwait, Lebanon, Libya, Morocco, Omar, Qatar, Saudi Arabia, Syria, Tunisia, United Arab Emirates, and Yemen. The partnerships in this region focused on workforce and career development.

== Funding ==
Higher Education for Development grants were funded by the United States Agency for International Development (USAID) and its Missions abroad.
