= David Serwadda =

Ugandan physician

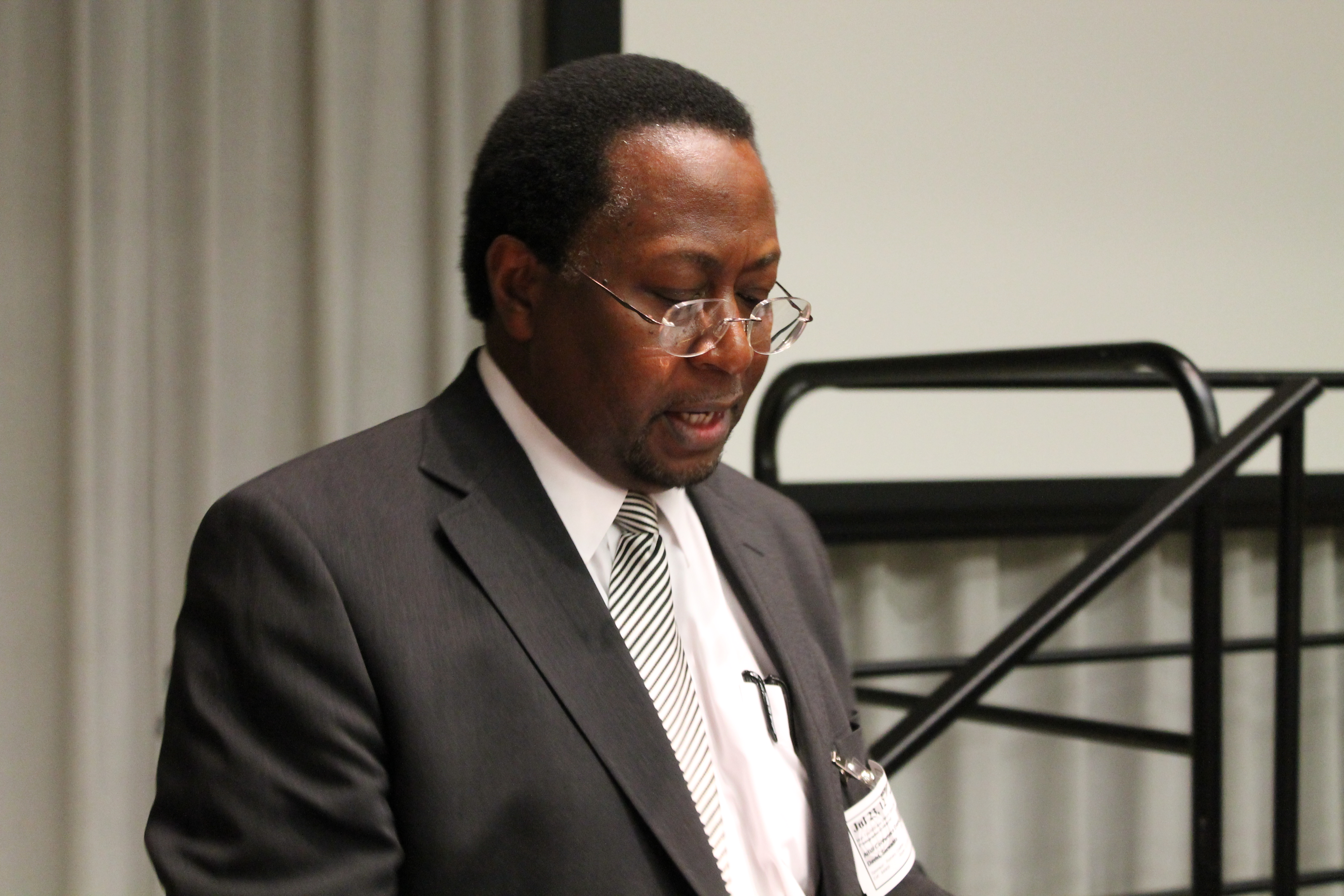
- Born: 1 January 1959 (age 67); Uganda
- Citizenship: Uganda
- Education: Makerere University (Bachelor of Medicine and Bachelor of Surgery) (Master of Medicine in Medicine); Bloomberg School of Public Health (Master of Science) (Master of Public Health)
- Occupations: Physician, researcher, academic
- Years active: 1984–present
- Known for: Medical research
- Title: Professor of Public Health; Makerere University School of Public Health

David M. Serwadda is a Ugandan physician, medical researcher, academic, public health specialist and medical administrator. Currently he is a professor of Public Health at Makerere University School of Public Health, one of the schools of Makerere University College of Health Sciences, a semi-autonomous constituent college of Makerere University. He is also a founding member of Accordia Global Health Foundation's Academic Alliance.

== Background and education ==
Serwadda was born in Kampala, Uganda's capital city. He was educated at Namilyango College, a prestigious, all-boys residential middle and high school (Grades 8–13), located in Mukono District, from 1972 until 1977. In 1978, he entered the Makerere University School of Medicine, where he obtained a Bachelor of Medicine and Bachelor of Surgery, graduating in 1983. He went on to obtain a Master of Medicine degree, specializing in internal medicine, also from Makerere University, in the mid-1980s. He later obtained a Master of Science degree and a Master of Public Health degree, both from the Bloomberg School of Public Health at Johns Hopkins University in Baltimore, Maryland, USA.

== Work experience ==
In the early 1980s, Serwadda was one of the earliest physicians in Uganda to recognize the new disease that caused patients to lose weight and "slim" down to abnormal cachectic sizes. The new disease, at first called Slim Disease, became known as HIV/AIDS. He has been a leading researcher in the epidemiology of HIV/AIDS in sub-Saharan Africa. He has published the finding of his research in numerous medical journals and other peer publications. He has attended many national, regional and International conferences as a presenter and/or moderator on the subject matter.

In the 1990s, he was appointed director of the then Makerere Institute of Public Health. He served in that position until 2007 when he was promoted to the position of dean, Makerere University School of Public Health, following the elevation of the institute to a constituent School of Makerere University College of Health Sciences. He later resigned as dean of the School of Public Health, but he continues to teach and carry out research in his capacity as professor of Public Health. Serwadda is a fellow of the Uganda National Academy of Sciences.

== Research ==
As a medical researcher, he has been involved in several scientific studies, some of which are listed below.

- HIV-1 infection associated with abnormal vaginal flora morphology and bacterial vaginosis (co-authored), published in The Lancet.
- Control of sexually transmitted diseases for AIDS prevention in Uganda: a randomised community trial (co-authored), published in The Lancet.
- Health professionals for a new century: transforming education to strengthen health systems in an interdependent world (co-authored), published in The Lancet.
- Viral load and heterosexual transmission of Human Immunodeficiency Virus Type 1 (co-authored), published in the New England Journal of Medicine.
- Male circumcision for HIV prevention in men in Rakai, Uganda: a randomised trial (co-authored), published in The Lancet.
- Rates of HIV-1 transmission per Coital Act, by stage of HIV-1 infection, in Rakai, Uganda (co-authored), published in the Journal of Infectious Diseases.
- Probability of HIV-1 transmission per coital act in monogamous, heterosexual, HIV-1-discordant couples in Rakai, Uganda (co-authored), published in The Lancet.

== Personal details ==
Serwadda is married and, by his wife Deborah Serwadda, is the father of three adult children.
