= Michael Kawooya =

Michael Kawooya may refer to:

- Michael Kawooya (physician) (born 1958), Uganda professor of radiology and world expert in ultrasound
- Michael Kawooya (squash player) (born 1984), Ugandan squash player
