= Mulago Women's Referral Hospital =

- Uganda Ministry of Health
- Location within Kampala

Geography
- Location: Mulago, Kampala, Uganda
- Coordinates: 00°20′16″N 32°34′41″E

Organisation
- Care system: Public
- Type: General and Teaching
- Affiliated university: Makerere University College of Health Sciences

Services
- Emergency department: I
- Beds: 450

History
- Founded: 2018

Links
- Other links: Hospitals in Uganda; Medical education in Uganda

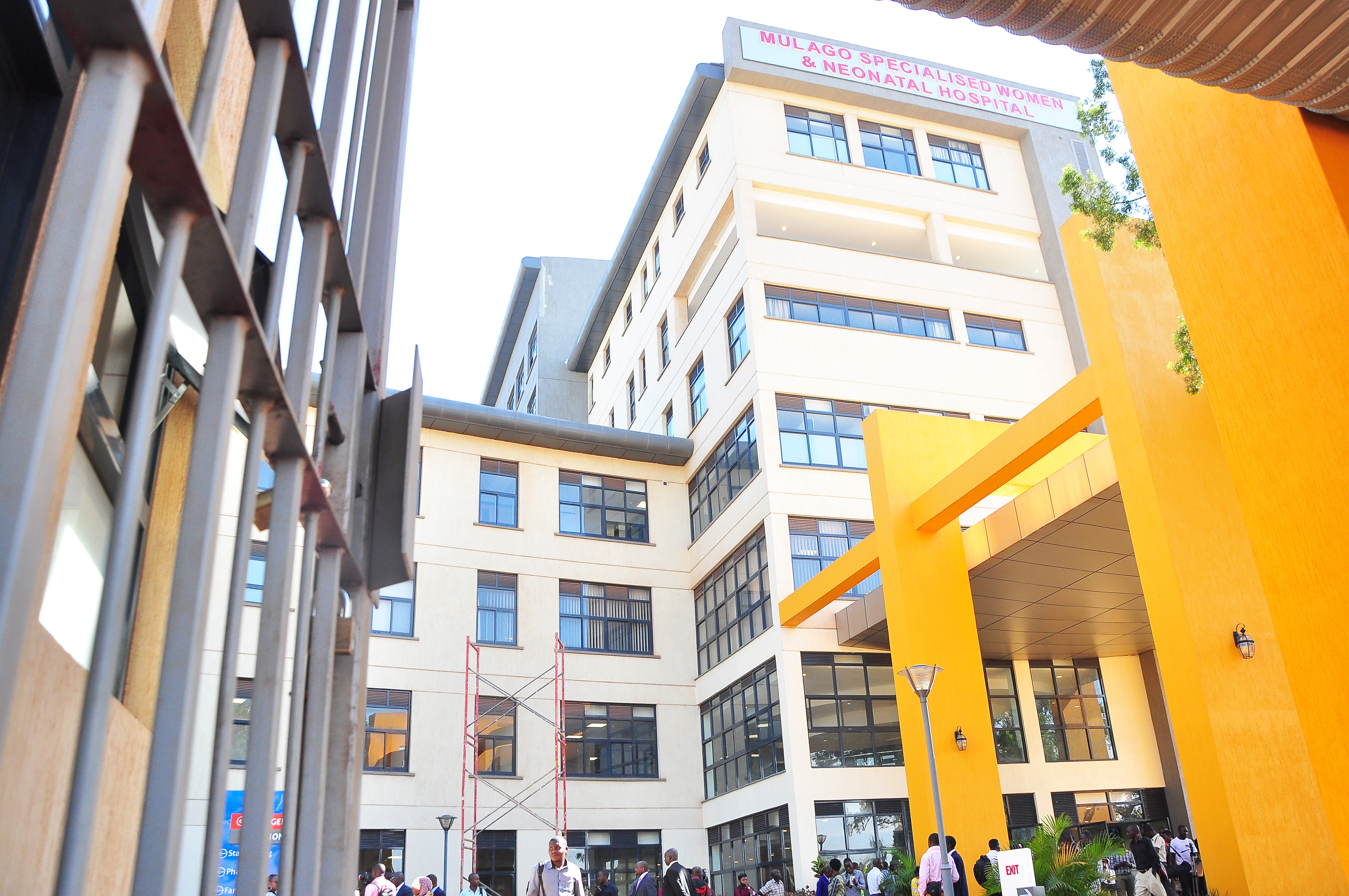
Mulago Specialised Hospital Maternal and Neonatal center

Mulago Women's Referral Hospital, whose official name is Mulago Specialised Women and Neonatal Hospital, is a component of Mulago National Referral Hospital, the largest hospital in Uganda, which serves as the teaching hospital of Makerere University College of Health Sciences. The construction of the women's hospital started in April 2013, with commissioning originally expected in the second half of 2016. After delays, construction was completed in July 2018.

== Location ==
The hospital is located on Mulago Hill in the northern part of the city of Kampala. It sits within the Mulago Hospital Complex, the teaching hospital of Makerere University College of Health Sciences. This location is approximately 4 kilometres (2 mi), by road, north of Kampala's central business district. The coordinates of Mulago Women's Referral Hospital are 0°20'16.0"N, 32°34'41.0"E (Latitude:0.337778; Longitude:32.578056).

== Overview ==
Mulago Women's Referral Hospital is the specialized women's unit within Mulago National Referral Hospital. It consists of the prenatal clinics, the delivery wards, surgical theaters, recovery rooms and postnatal wards. The hospital caters to obstetric and gynecologic patients. It has an oncology wing reserved for patients with gynecologic cancers, including ovarian cancer, fallopian tube cancers, uterine cancer, endometrial cancer, cervical cancer, vaginal cancer and vulvar malignancies. The hospital will have state-of-the-art newborn wards, pre-term neonatal wards, a newborn intensive care unit and a 60-bed private wing for expectant mothers, those who have just delivered and private gynecology patients. The hospital will handle high risk prenatal and high risk gynecology cases. The hospital has a unit specializing in obstetric fistula prevention, repair and rehabilitation. It also houses the first public fertility clinic in the country.

== Bed allocation ==
As of December 2018, the hospital's beds were subdivided into the following classes:

Mulago Women's Referral Hospital Bed Allocation
Rank	Type of Bed	Number of Beds	Percentage of Total
1	Recovery Ward	25	5.5
2	Intensive Care Unit	40	8.9
3	New Born Nursery	50	11.1
4	Oncology	80	17.8
5	Other Beds	85	18.9
6	High Risk Obstetrics	170	37.8
	Total	450	100.0

Note: Totals may be slightly off due to rounding

== Costs, funding and timeline ==
The women's hospital was constructed at a budgeted cost of US$34.14 million, consisting of a loan of US$33 million from the Islamic Development Bank and US$1.14 million in direct funding by the Government of Uganda. Construction began in April 2013 and was expected to last until December 2016. Construction of the women's hospital coincides with the ongoing general renovation and upgrade of the entire Mulago Hospital complex at a budgeted cost of US$49 million, using a loan from the African Development Bank. Those improvements started in October 2014 and were originally expected to last two years. As of August 2017, construction was still in progress. Construction was finally concluded in July 2018.

The Mulago Women and Neonatal Hospital is expected to admit the first patient on 17 September 2018. It is expected to employ 788 people.

== Management ==
In August 2018, the Uganda Ministry of Health appointed Dr. Evelyn Nabunya, a Senior Consultant Gynecologist as the executive director of the hospital and Dr. Jolly Nankunda, as the deputy executive director.

== See also ==
- Makerere University School of Medicine
- Uganda Hospitals
- Kawempe General Hospital
- Kiruddu General Hospital
- Naguru General Hospital
- List of medical schools in Uganda
- Makerere University College of Health Sciences
