= John Wycliffe Musinguzi =

Ugandan sports journalist and writer

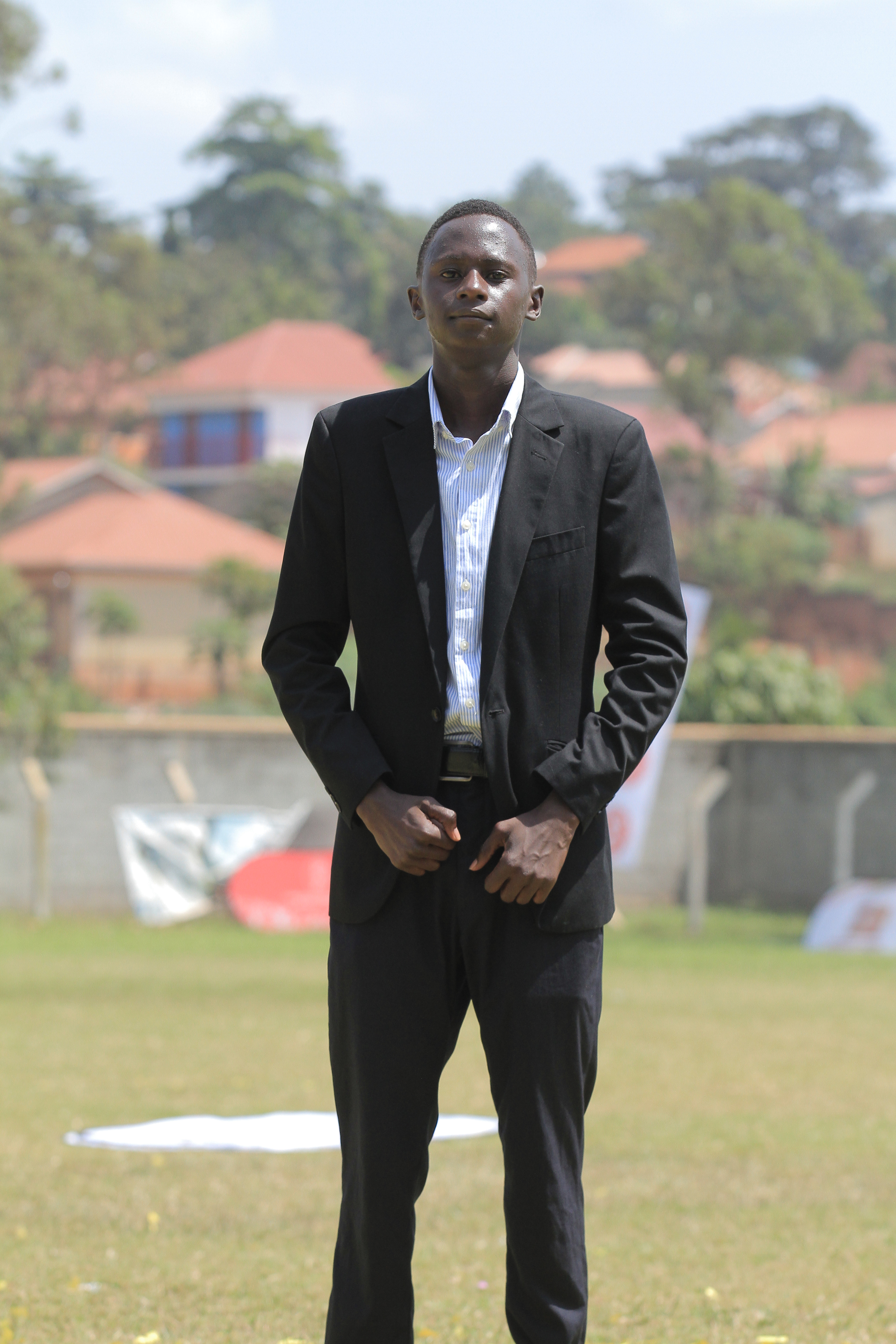
- John during a USSSA event in 2026
- Born: August 16, 2006 (age 20); Mulago, Kampala-Uganda.
- Education: CAF young reporters' program
- Occupations: Journalist, Writer and Media officer
- Years active: 2021–present

John Wycliffe Musinguzi (born 16 August 2006) is a Ugandan sports journalist and writer. He specialises in school sports and football, he covered the TotalEnergies CAF African Nations Championship 2024.

== Early life and education ==
Wycliffe was born at Mulago Hospital and grew up in Fort Portal. He was raised largely by his grandmother Oliva Tibasaga and uncle James Kisembo, alongside his sister Patience Kanweri.

He attended media capacity building organised by Uganda Secondary Schools Sports Association (USSSA) and CAF young reporters' program before he joined Standard High School Zzana for his secondary school.

== Career ==
Wycliffe began his sports journalism journey in 2021 at the age of sixteen, during the COVID-19 lockdown.

While attending high school, he started working on Jubilee FM. Wycliffe joined Life FM(Uganda) in February 2023, where he established extensive connections with sports journalists.
