= Harriet Mayanja-Kizza =

Ugandan academic

- Born: 1950s Central Region, Uganda
- Citizenship: Uganda
- Education: Makerere University (Bachelor of Medicine and Bachelor of Surgery) (Master of Medicine in Medicine); Case Western Reserve University (Master of Science in Immunology); American College of Physicians (Fellow of the American College of Physicians)
- Occupations: Medical researcher, academic administrator
- Years active: 1978–present
- Title: Former Dean; Makerere University School of Medicine

Harriet Mayanja-Kizza is a Ugandan physician, researcher, and academic administrator. She is the former dean of Makerere University School of Medicine, the oldest medical school in East Africa, established in 1924.

== Background and education ==
She was born in the Central Region of Uganda in the 1950s. She holds the degree of Bachelor of Medicine and Bachelor of Surgery, obtained from Makerere University in 1978. She also holds the degree of Master of Medicine in Internal Medicine, obtained in 1983, also from Makerere. She studied immunology and pathology at Case Western Reserve University in Cleveland, Ohio, USA, graduating with the degree of Master of Science in those fields in 1999. She is a Fellow of the American College of Physicians .

== Career ==
Mayanja-Kizza has worked as a lecturer in the Department of Internal Medicine at Makerere University Medical School. She has also served as the head of the Department of Internal Medicine, both at the medical school and at Mulago National Referral Hospital, the university's teaching hospital. In November 2010, she was appointed dean of the Makerere Medical School, at Makerere University College of Health Sciences. She has presented widely at national, regional, and international conferences and has published extensively in peer journals. In 2022, she was ranked by the AD Scientific Index as the best scientist in Uganda.

== Other considerations ==
Her area of specialization is immunology, focusing on the interaction between AIDS and tuberculosis. Her research focuses on immunopathogenesis, and immune-modulation treatments among patients with human immunodeficiency virus infection and tuberculosis. Professor Harriet Mayanja-Kizza is a Fellow of the Uganda National Academy of Sciences.

== See also ==
- Makerere University College of Health Sciences
- Mulago National Referral Hospital

== Research ==
She is a researcher with more than 200 publications and 9277 citations of her works as of May 2022. Some of her articles with more than 100 citations include:

- Combination therapy with fluconazole and flucytosine for cryptococcal meningitis in Ugandan patients with AIDS (1998)
- Impact of tuberculosis (TB) on HIV-1 activity in dually infected patients (2001)
- A study of the safety, immunology, virology, and microbiology of adjunctive etanercept in HIV-1-associated tuberculosis (2004)
- Immunoadjuvant prednisolone therapy for HIV-associated tuberculosis: a phase 2 clinical trial in Uganda (2005)
- Patient and health service delay in pulmonary tuberculosis patients attending a referral hospital: a cross-sectional study (2005)
- Acceptance of routine testing for HIV among adult patients at the medical emergency unit at a national referral hospital in Kampala, Uganda (2007)
- Predictors of long-term viral failure among Ugandan children and adults treated with antiretroviral therapy (2007)
- Genome scan of M. tuberculosis infection and disease in Ugandans (2008)
- Outcomes of cryptococcal meningitis in Uganda before and after the availability of highly active antiretroviral therapy (2008)
- Severe sepsis in two Ugandan hospitals: a prospective observational study of management and outcomes in a predominantly HIV-1 infected population (2009)
- Relationship of immunodiagnostic assays for tuberculosis and numbers of circulating CD4+ T-cells in HIV infection (2010)
- Sero-prevalence and risk factors for hepatitis B virus infection among health care workers in a tertiary hospital in Uganda (2010)
- High T-cell immune activation and immune exhaustion among individuals with suboptimal CD4 recovery after 4 years of antiretroviral therapy in an African cohort (2011)
- The impact of early monitored management on survival in hospitalized adult Ugandan patients with severe sepsis: a prospective intervention study (2012)
- FCRL5 Delineates Functionally Impaired Memory B Cells Associated with Plasmodium falciparum Exposure (2015)
- Novel serologic biomarkers provide accurate estimates of recent Plasmodium falciparum exposure for individuals and communities (2015)
- A blood RNA signature for tuberculosis disease risk: a prospective cohort study (2016)
- Concise gene signature for point‐of‐care classification of tuberculosis (2016)
- Diagnostic performance of a seven-marker serum protein biosignature for the diagnosis of active TB disease in African primary healthcare clinic attendees with signs and symptoms suggestive of TB (2016)
- Four-gene pan-African blood signature predicts progression to tuberculosis (2018)
- Immunological mechanisms of human resistance to persistent Mycobacterium tuberculosis infection (2018)
- IFN-γ-independent immune markers of Mycobacterium tuberculosis exposure (2019)
