= Mbarara University School of Medicine =

School of Medicine in Uganda

Coordinates: 0°37′00″S 30°39′27″E

- Type: Public
- Established: 1989
- Affiliations: Mbarara University of Science and Technology
- Location: Mbarara, Uganda
- Campus: Urban

Mbarara University School of Medicine (MUSM), also known as Mbarara University Medical School (MUMS) is the school of medicine of Mbarara University of Science and Technology, one of Uganda's public universities. The medical school was founded in 1989, the same year that the university was established.

== Location ==
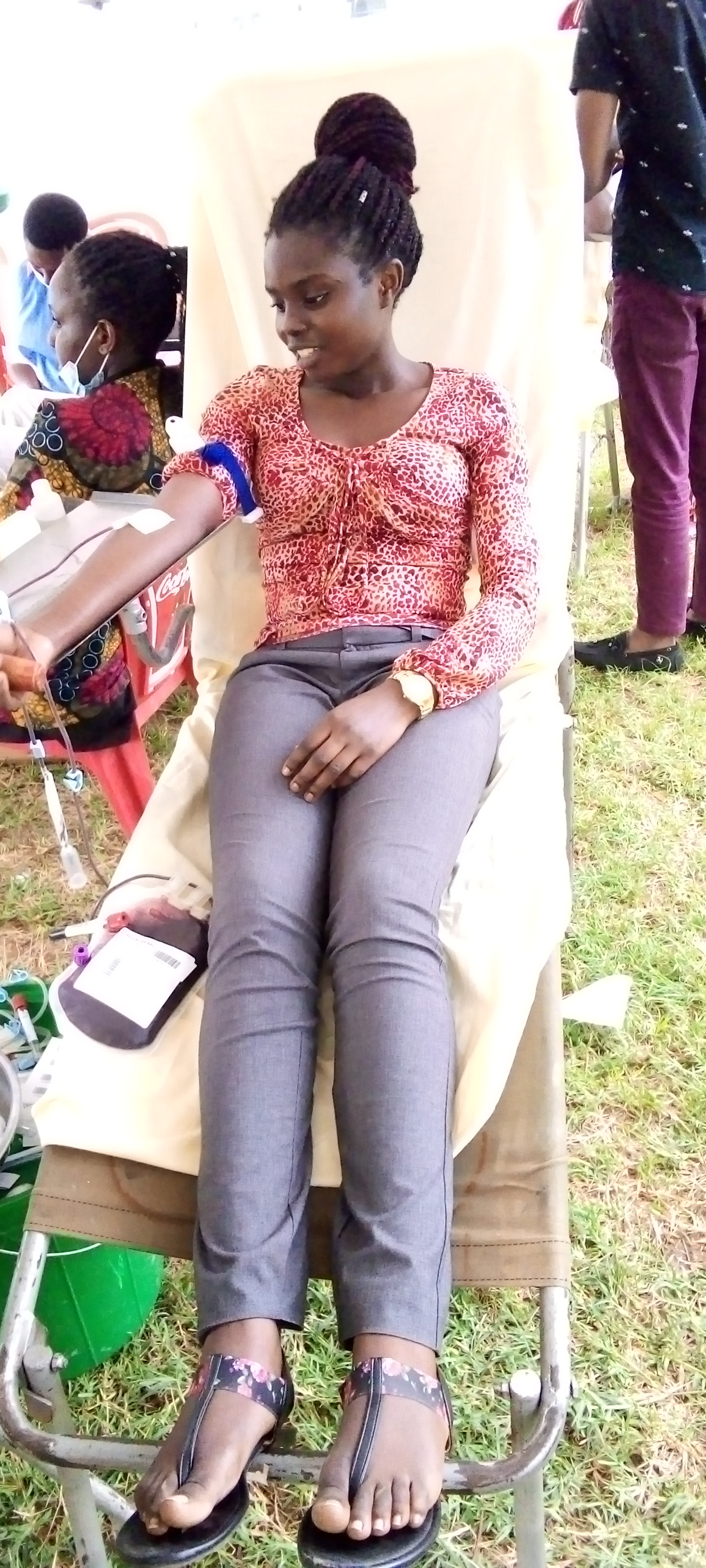
Blood donation at Mbarara University, Uganda

The school's campus is located on the premises of Mbarara Regional Referral Hospital, in the city of Mbarara, in Mbarara District, Western Uganda. Mbarara is the largest urban center in this region of the county, approximately 295 kilometres (183 mi), by road, southwest of Kampala, the capital of Uganda, and the largest city in the country.

== Overview ==
Mbarara University School of Medicine constitutes the Faculty of Medicine at Mbarara University. The faculty is headed by a Dean, who is deputized by a Deputy Dean. The teaching discipline of the medical school are integrated with the regional referral hospital. The hospital's consultants and registrars, and interns also serve as teaching staff for the university's medical students.

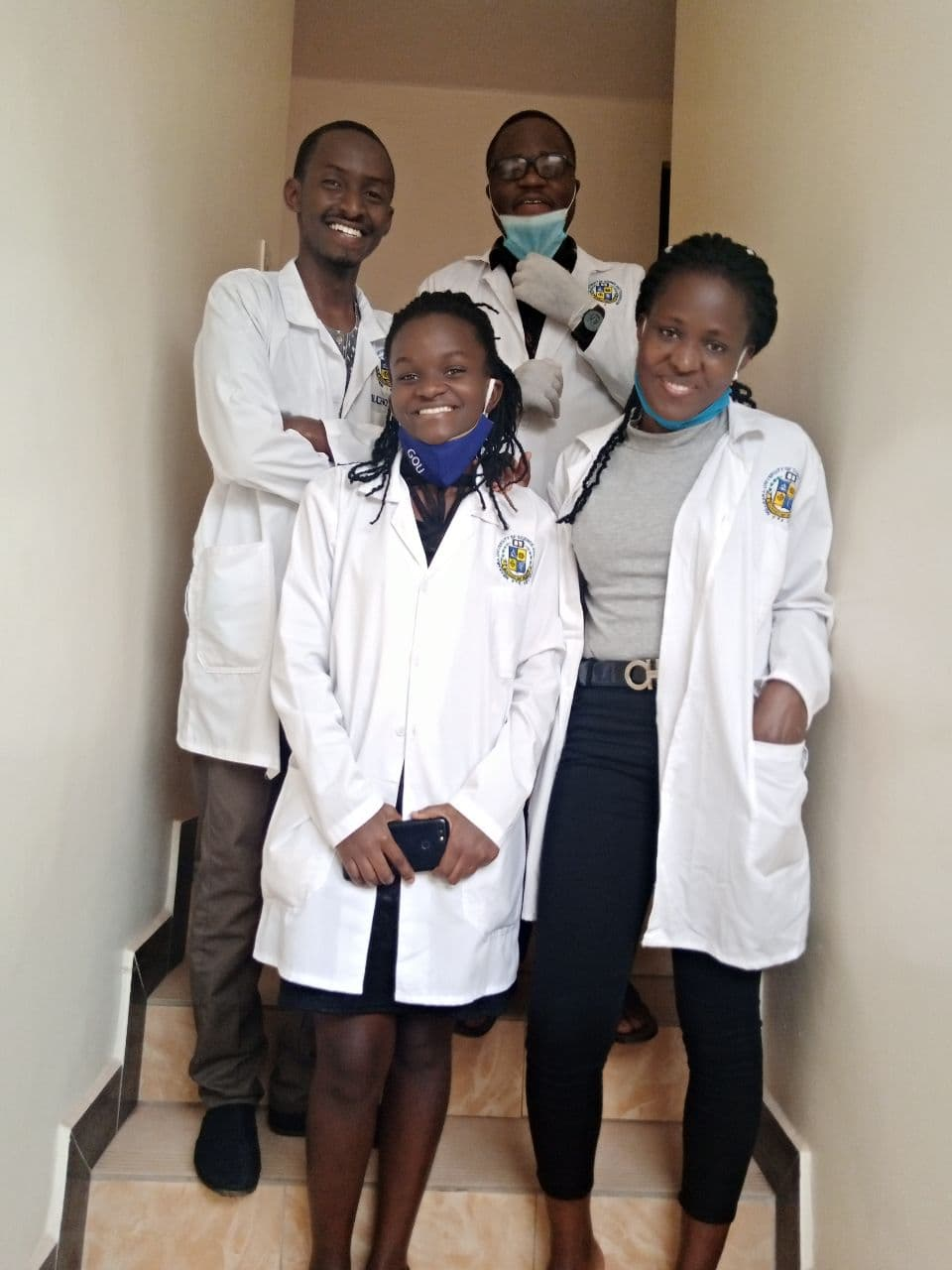
Young Medical doctors at Mbarara University Medical School

Uganda's first female neurosurgeon, Juliet Sekabunga Nalwanga, trained there.

== See also ==
- Uganda Education
- MUST
- Medical Schools
- UG Medical Schools
- Uganda Hospitals
