= Fred Wabwire-Mangen =

Ugandan physician

- Born: Uganda
- Citizenship: Uganda
- Education: Makerere University (Bachelor of Medicine and Bachelor of Surgery); Liverpool School of Tropical Medicine (Diploma in Tropical Medicine and Hygiene); Bloomberg School of Public Health (Master of Public Health) (Doctor of Philosophy)
- Occupations: Physician, Academic & Researcher
- Years active: 1983 — present
- Known for: Academic research

Frederick Wabwire-Mangen is a Ugandan physician, public health specialist and medical researcher. Currently he is Professor of Epidemiology and Head of Department of Epidemiology & Biostatistics at Makerere University School of Public Health. Wabwire-Mangen also serves as the Chairman of Council of Kampala International University and a founding member of Accordia Global Health Foundation’s Academic Alliance

== Background and education ==
He was born in Busia District, Eastern Uganda. He attended Nakasero Primary School and sat for his O-Level examinations from St. Mary's College Kisubi. Professor Wabwire-Mangen received his first medical degree, Bachelor of Medicine and Bachelor of Surgery (MBChB) from Makerere University School of Medicine. He also holds the Diploma in Tropical Medicine and Hygiene (DTM&H) from the Liverpool School of Tropical Medicine. His Master of Public Health (MPH) and Doctor of Philosophy (PhD) degrees, were both obtained from the Bloomberg School of Public Health at Johns Hopkins University in Baltimore, Maryland, United States.

== Work experience ==
Dr. Wabwire-Manghen has been a researcher, academician and lecturer at Makerere University School of Public Health for most of his professional life. He has published extensively in medical journals and other peer publications. He is a leading authority on the epidemiology of HIV/AIDS in sub-Saharan Africa. He is also the chairperson of the National Population Council. He is also a former dean of the Makerere University School of Public Health Professor Fred Wabwire-Mangen is a Fellow of the Uganda National Academy of Sciences.

Some of his research published include the following; Malaria in Uganda: Challenges to control on the long road to elimination: I. Epidemiology and current control efforts. Male circumcision for HIV prevention in men in Rakai, Uganda: a randomised trial. This study established that male circumcision reduced HIV incidence in men without behavioural disinhibition. Circumcision can be recommended for HIV prevention in men. Viral load and heterosexual transmission of human immunodeficiency virus type 1. The study concluded that viral load is the chief predictor of the risk of heterosexual transmission of HIV-1, and transmission is rare among persons with levels of less than 1500 copies of HIV-1 RNA per milliliter. Rates of HIV-1 transmission per coital Act, by stage of HIV-1 infection, in Rakai, Uganda. Probability of HIV-1 transmission per coital act in monogamous, heterosexual, HIV-1-discordant couples in Rakai, Uganda. The study established that higher viral load and genital ulceration are the main determinants of HIV-1 transmission per coital act in this Ugandan population. Control of sexually transmitted diseases for AIDS prevention in Uganda: a randomised community trial. The study found no effect of the STD intervention on the incidence of HIV-1 infection. Current status and future prospects of epidemiology and public health training and research in the WHO African region. The study recommended that capacity building and training initiatives in epidemiology are required to promote research and address the public health challenges facing the continent. HIV-1 infection associated with abnormal vaginal flora morphology and bacterial vaginosis. Increased risk of incident HIV during pregnancy in Rakai, Uganda: a prospective study. Population-based study of fertility in women with HIV-1 infection in Uganda. The effects of male circumcision on female partners' genital tract symptoms and vaginal infections in a randomized trial in Rakai, Uganda.

== See also ==
- MUCHS
- MUSPH
- MUSM
- Mulago Hospital Complex
- Busia District, Uganda
