= Phyllis Kyomuhendo =

Ugandan entrepreneur

- Born: Kampala, Uganda
- Citizenship: Uganda
- Education: Bachelors Degree in medical radiography, Makerere university Masters in public health
- Known for: Entrepreneurship and innovation
- Notable work: Developing the M-SCAN device
- Awards: Youth Achievers Award, 2018 Women in Tech Awards

Phyllis Kyomuhendo is a Ugandan entrepreneur, innovator and the co-founder of m-SCAN.

== Background and education ==
Phyllis grew up with two sisters, raised by a single mother. She obtained her Bachelor's Degree in Medical Radiography from Makerere University school of medicine, and holds a Masters in Public health.

== Career ==
Kyomuhendo did community placement in rural areas of Uganda, where she saw the death of women due to pregnancy related complications caused by infrastructure challenges such as shortages in water and electricity needed to run the CT scans, MRI, X-rays and ultrasound machines. In 2017, Phyllis Kyomuhendo, alongside Prosper Ahimbisibwe, Menyo Innocent, and Ivan Nasasira developed the M-SCAN, a mobile ultrasound device. M-SCAN is energy efficient and portable compared to the previous scanner used in Ugandan areas, and was made to reduce instances of maternal death and promote safe birth deliveries.

== Awards ==
- Kyomuhendo won the 2021 YALE Africa Startup Review; as the winner of the 2018 TechCrunch Startup Battlefield Africa. In 2019 she also won the Johnson & Johnson Africa Innovation challenge.
- Young Achiever's Award 2018 at Serena Hotel, Kampala
- Women in Tech Awards at GITEX Africa
