= Makerere University School of Public Health =

- Type: Public
- Established: July 1, 2007; 18 years ago
- Dean: Professor Rhoda Wanyenze
- Location: Kampala, Uganda; 00°20′15″N 32°34′38″E
- Campus: Urban
- Website: Homepage
- Location in Kampala

Makerere University School of Public Health (MUSPH) is one of the schools that comprise the Makerere University College of Health Sciences, a constituent college of Makerere University, Uganda's oldest and largest public university.

== Location ==
MUSPH is located on Mulago Hill, adjacent to the Mulago Hospital Complex, approximately 3 kilometres (2 mi), by road, north of the central business district of Kampala, the capital and largest city of Uganda. The geographical coordinates of the school are 0°20'15.0"N, 32°34'38.0"E (Latitude:0.337500; Longitude:32.577222).

As of August 2017, the school was preparing to break ground for a new five-storey headquarters building, to house innovation laboratories, auditoriums, tutorial rooms, demonstration rooms, as well as space for postgraduate students, doctoral students, post-doctoral trainees, research fellows and visiting scholars. A total of US$3 million was needed. At that time, more than 3/4ths of the funds had been secured.

== History ==
The origins of MUSPH date back to 1957 when the Department of Preventive Medicine was established at Makerere University Medical School. In 1975, the department was elevated to the Makerere Institute of Public Health and moved to a new five-storey building of its own. The institute was elevated to a full-fledged School of Public Health and made a constituent school of the Makerere University College of Health Sciences in 2007.

== Departments ==
As of August 2018, MUSPH had the following departments:

- Department of Health Policy, Planning and Management
- Department of Epidemiology and Biostatistics
- Department of Community Health and Behavioural Sciences
- Department of Disease Control and Occupational Health
- Regional Centre for Quality of Health Care

== Postgraduate programmes ==
MUSPH focuses more on graduate training than undergraduate. As of August 2018, the school offered the following graduate programmes.

- Master of Public Health (Distance Education): A 3-year distance education masters programme tailor-made for busy working health professionals who cannot afford full-time in-class coursework
- Master of Public Health: A full-time 2-year Masters course
- Master of Science in Health Services Research
- Master of Science in Public Health Nutrition
- Master of Science in Public Health Disaster Management
- Masters in Health Informatics
- Masters in Biostatistics

== Short courses ==
As of August 2018, MUSPH offered the following short courses:

1. Short Course in Humanitarian and Disaster Resilience Leadership
2. Short Course in Community Health and Behavioural Sciences #
3. Short Courses in Epidemiology and Biostatistics
4. Short Course in Water, Sanitation and Hygiene.

== Undergraduate courses ==
The following undergraduate courses are offered at MUSPH:

- Bachelor of Environmental Health Sciences: A three-year course

MUSPH offers instruction in the following undergraduate programs whose qualifications are awarded by other schools within the Makerere University College of Health Sciences:

- Bachelor of Medicine and Bachelor of Surgery: Offered by Makerere University School of Medicine
- Bachelor of Radiography: Offered by Makerere University School of Medicine
- Bachelor of Pharmacy: Offered by Makerere University School of Biomedical Sciences
- Bachelor of Science in Nursing: Offered by Makerere University School of Health Sciences
- Bachelor of Dental Surgery: Offered by Makerere University School of Health Sciences.

== Notable faculty ==
- Rhoda Wanyenze, Physician, infectious diseases specialist, associate professor of public health
- David Serwadda, Physician, infectious diseases specialist, professor of public health
- Fred Wabwire-Mangen, Physician, epidemiologist, professor of public health.

== Former faculty ==
- Professor William Bazeyo. For a period of eight years, ending in September 2017, he served as the Dean of the School. Since 15 September 2017, Professor Bazeyo is the Deputy Vice Chancellor, responsible for Finance and Administration at Makerere University.

== See also ==
- Education in Uganda
- Makerere University
- Makerere University College of Health Sciences
- Makerere University School of Biomedical Sciences
- Makerere University School of Medicine
- Makerere University School of Health Sciences
