= Mulago =

- Map of Kampala showing the location of Mulago.
- Coordinates: 0°20′33″N 32°34′37″E
- Country: Uganda
- Region: Central Uganda
- District: Kampala Capital City Authority
- Division: Kampala Central Division
- Elevation: 1,260 m (4,130 ft)
- Time zone: UTC+3 (EAT)

Mulago is a hill in north-central Kampala, the capital city of Uganda. The hill rises 4,134 feet (1,260 m) above sea level. The name also applies to the neighborhoods that sit on this hill.

== Location ==
Mulago is in Kawempe Division, one of the five administrative divisions of Kampala. It is approximately 4 kilometres (2.5 mi), by road, north of the city's central business district. The coordinates of Mulago are 0°20'33.0"N, 32°34'37.0"E (Latitude:0.342508; Longitude:32.576959).

== History ==
Mulago was derived from the Ganda word 'omulago', a type of medicine, kept on this hill that was used by King Suna II for protection against spirits. This hill now contains Mulago Hospital. Built in 1917, Old Mulago Hospital merged with the New Mulago Hospital in 1960 to form a giant complex that is now the national referral hospital. The complex also houses Makerere University Medical School."

== Mulago neighborhood ==
At the lower end of the hill about 2 kilometres (1.2 mi) from the hospital complex, are the Uganda Museum and headquarters of the Uganda Wildlife Authority at Kamwookya. The British High Commission office and the High Commission office of Rwanda are both located in neighboring Kamwookya.

The hill is, however, dominated by hospital related activities that include:

- A doctors' village
- A nurses' Hostel
- Infectious Diseases Institute
- Mulago National Referral Hospital
- Makerere University College of Health Sciences
- Makerere University School of Medicine
- Makerere University School of Public Health
- Makerere University School of Biomedical Sciences
- Makerere University School of Health Sciences
- Mulago Specialised Women and Neonatal Hospital
- Upper Mulago Regional Referral Hospital
- Uganda Cancer Institute
- Uganda Heart Institute
- Baylor College of Medicine Children's Foundation - Uganda
- MU-JHU Care Ltd | MU-JHU (Makerere University-Johns Hopkins University) Research Collaboration
- Kampala City Mortuary

== Other prominent structures and buildings in the neighborhood ==
- Uganda Radio Network
- Kitante Medical Centre

The headquarters of the Uganda Ministry of Health is located at Wandegeya, in the valley between Nakasero Hill and Mulago Hill. There is a small residential area on Mulago Hill, overlooking the Uganda National Museum. Also, there is a market at Kamwookya, between Kololo Hill and Mulago Hill. The Uganda Electricity Transmission Company Limited maintains a large electricity sub-station at Mulago, which distributes power to the northern part of the city, including Makerere University, the Mulago Hospital Complex, Old Kampala and most of Nakasero Hill.

== See also ==
- Kampala Capital City Authority
