= Bachelor of Pharmacy =

Academic degree

A Bachelor of Pharmacy (abbreviated BPharm or PharmB) or Bachelor of Science in Pharmacy (BS Pharm) is an academic degree in the field of pharmacy. The degree provides training to understand the properties and impacts of medicines and develop the skills required to counsel patients about their use. In most countries where it is offered, the course of study typically requires four years. Bachelor of Pharmacy degree holders can pursue various career paths, including working as a pharmacist, providing patient counseling, pursuing further studies such as a master's degree, teaching at a university as a lecturer, or working as a drug information specialist.

In most Western countries, PharmB and PharmD are considered equivalent since they are both prerequisites to be licensed. In many Western countries, foreign graduates with BPharm, PharmB, or BS Pharm practice similarly to PharmD graduates. It is analogous to an MBBS versus an MD, where MBBS is the foreign equivalent of an MD. In some countries, the BPharm has been superseded by the Doctor of Pharmacy (PharmD) and Master of Pharmacy (MPharm) degrees. In the United States, this degree has been superseded by the PharmD. In Canada, the UK, Australia, and New Zealand, a Bachelor of Pharmacy degree is a prerequisite for practicing as a pharmacist. See list of pharmacy schools for institutions offering the BPharm degree.

== Asia and Oceania ==
=== Australia ===
In Australia, the BPharm degree is awarded following a four-year undergraduate pharmacy program. Australian undergraduate pharmacy courses were previously three years but increased to four years during the 1990s with greater emphasis on pharmacy practice education. It is compulsory to undertake clinical placements during this undergraduate program. During the early 2000s, two-year postgraduate Master of Pharmacy (MPharm) courses were established by many universities, but these have accounted for a relatively minor proportion of pharmacy graduates.

All BPharm programs in Australia are accredited by the New Zealand and Australian Pharmacy Schools Accreditation Committee (NAPSAC). These programs provide comprehensive training in various fields, including pharmacology, chemistry, pharmaceutical chemistry, pharmacy practice (such as pharmacotherapeutics and disease state management), pharmaceutics, ethics, pharmacy law, pharmacy management, physiology, anatomy, biochemistry, pharmacokinetics, and medication compounding. At present, either the BPharm degree or the MPharm degree is acceptable for registration as a practicing pharmacist.

As with most honors degrees at Australian universities, the awarding of a Bachelor of Pharmacy (Honors) (abbreviated BPharm(Hons)) is based on the completion of original research and a high level of academic performance. All other graduates are awarded a pass degree. Unlike most honors degrees in Australia, an additional year of study is not required for a BPharm(Hons), as most universities integrate research and coursework into the fourth year of BPharm(Hons) programs.

In 2003, the University of Sydney began offering a four-year Bachelor of Pharmacy (Rural) (abbreviated BPharm (Rural)) program at its Orange campus. It was designed to address the continuing shortage of pharmacists in rural areas and placed greater emphasis on rural aspects of pharmacy practice. Since the BPharm and BPharm (Rural) had most units of study in common, academics delivered many lectures at the main campus in Sydney with a live video broadcast to students at Orange. The program was not offered in 2005 due to the transfer of Orange campus to Charles Sturt University. Following a review, a new BPharm (Rural) program was offered from 2006 onwards at the university's main campus (Camperdown/Darlington campus). Although the rural program has not continued, focus on a rural workforce remains within the degree. Rural placements are encouraged in almost all undergraduate programs.

=== Hong Kong ===
In Hong Kong, a Bachelor of Pharmacy degree is offered by the Chinese University of Hong Kong (CUHK) under the Faculty of Medicine. The CUHK Bachelor of Pharmacy program started in 1992 and was the only pharmacy degree program available in Hong Kong until 2009. The degree is awarded upon satisfactory completion of at least three to four years of full-time study. To be considered for registration as a practicing pharmacist in Hong Kong by the Pharmacy and Poisons Board, graduates must complete an additional year of pre-registration training. In 2009, the University of Hong Kong (HKU) implemented a Bachelor of Pharmacy program under the Li Ka Shing Faculty of Medicine.

=== India ===
The Bachelor of Pharmacy degree is a four-year program with both annual and semester schemes available. Diploma of Pharmacy (DPharm) holders are eligible for admission directly into the second year of the BPharm program. BPharm holders can enter directly into the fourth year of the PharmD (PG) course. Colleges imparting pharmaceutical education (DPharm, BPharm, MPharm, or PharmD) must be approved by the All Indian Council of Technical Education and the Pharmacy Council of India (PCI). BPharm is often superseded by MPharm, PharmD (PB), and PhD-level courses, although the minimum qualification required for registration as a pharmacist is DPharm.

=== Bangladesh ===
The BPharm (Honors) in Bangladesh is a four-year program with both annual and semester schemes available. Colleges imparting pharmaceutical education (DPharm, BPharm, MPharm, or PharmD) must be approved by the Pharmacy Council of Bangladesh (PCB) .

=== Pakistan ===
PharmD is the only basic pharmacy degree awarded by universities in Pakistan. The five-year program is approved by the Pharmacy Council of Pakistan. Those who hold an older four-year Bachelor of Pharmacy (BPharmacy) and are registered as pharmacists with the Pharmacy Councils of Punjab, Sindh, Balochistan or Khyber-Pakhtunkhwa can study at any university for a one-year evening and/or weekend condensed course leading to a post-BPharmacy Doctor of Pharmacy.

== Europe ==
=== Norway ===
In Norway, the Bachelor of Pharmacy degree is awarded by Oslo Metropolitan University, The University of Tromsø and Nord University. The degree makes one eligible to work as a pharmacist in Norway. Norway also offers the Master of Pharmacy degree, which often offers higher payment and more job opportunities than the Bachelor of Pharmacy degree.

=== Ireland ===
MPharm (Hons) degrees in the Republic of Ireland are offered by:

- Trinity College, Dublin
- University College Cork
- Royal College of Surgeons in Ireland, Dublin

However, in Northern Ireland (which is part of the United Kingdom), MPharm degrees (as opposed to BSc or BPharm degrees) are offered at Queen's University Belfast as in the rest of the UK.

=== Finland ===
In Finland, pharmacy is taught in University of Helsinki, University of Eastern Finland and Åbo Akademi University. A Bachelor of Pharmacy is called farmaseutti (dispenser), and a Master of Pharmacy is called proviisori. A proviisori degree (MPharm) is required to be a pharmacist.

=== United Kingdom ===
In the United Kingdom, the BPharm degree was awarded following a three-year undergraduate pharmacy program. As a result of European Union harmonisation, the BPharm degree was superseded in 1997 by the Master of Pharmacy (MPharm) degree, which is awarded following a four-year program.

=== Portugal ===
In Portugal, the BPharm degree is awarded following a four-year program. The degree is necessary to become a pharmacy technician, and progressing to being a pharmacist by doing a master's degree alone is not possible.

== North America ==
=== Canada ===
The following Canadian universities formerly offered the bachelor's degree program and replaced it with the graduate Doctor of Pharmacy:

- Memorial University of Newfoundland (last cohort of BSc (Pharmacy) students graduated in 2020)
- University of Saskatchewan (program launched in 2017)
- Université de Montréal
- Université Laval
- University of Toronto
- University of Waterloo
- University of British Columbia
- University of Alberta
- University of Manitoba
- Dalhousie University

=== United States of America ===
Universities in the United States do not offer Bachelor of Pharmacy programs; however, many offer pre-doctoral programs and other undergraduate degrees that better an applicant's chance of becoming a student for a Doctor of Pharmacy degree.

== South America ==
=== Guyana ===
Texila American University offers the Bachelor of Pharmacy degree program.

=== Brazil ===
Universidade de São Paulo is the university of Latin America with the best degree program for Pharmacy.

== Africa ==
=== Nigeria ===
The BPharm degree remains the most commonly awarded pharmacy degree in Nigeria, although there has been a recent move towards the clinically oriented Doctor of Pharmacy degree. The following Nigerian universities still offer BPharm programs:

- University of Lagos
- Ahmadu Bello University
- Olabisi Onabanjo University
- University of Uyo
- Niger Delta University
- Madonna University, Nigeria
- University of Maiduguri
- Igbinedion University
- University of Port Harcourt
- Usmanu Danfodiyo University
- Delta State University, Abraka
- Gombe State University
- Kaduna State University
- Bayero University Kano
- Kaduna State University
- Chukwuemeka Odumegwu Ojukwu University

=== South Africa ===
The following South African universities offer BPharm programs:

- Nelson Mandela University – Department of Pharmacy
- North-West University (Potchefstroom Campus) – School of Pharmacy
- Rhodes University – School of Pharmaceutical Sciences
- University of KwaZulu-Natal (Westville Campus) – School of Pharmacy
- University of Limpopo (Medunsa Campus) in collaboration with Tshwane University of Technology – School of Pharmacy
- University of Limpopo (Turfloop Campus) – School of Pharmacy
- University of the Western Cape – School of Pharmacy
- University of the Witwatersrand – Department of Pharmacy

=== Lesotho ===
The following universities offer BPharm programs in Lesotho:

National University of Lesotho – Department of Pharmacy

=== Kenya ===
The following Kenyan universities offer BPharm programs:

- University of Nairobi – School of Pharmacy, KNH Campus
- Mount Kenya University
- Kenyatta University
- Jomo Kenyatta University of Agriculture and Technology
- Kenya Methodist University
- United States International University Africa
- Kabarak University

=== Uganda ===
The following Ugandan universities offer BPharm programs:

- Mbarara University of Science and Technology
- Makerere University School of Health Sciences
- Kampala International University School of Health Sciences

== See also ==
- Doctor of Pharmacy
- Master of Pharmacy
- Pharmacist
- Pharmaconomist
- List of pharmacy schools
