= Makerere University College of Health Sciences =

Oldest medical school in Uganda

- Type: Public
- Established: 1 July 2007; 18 years ago
- Affiliations: Makerere University
- Principal: Professor Damalie Nakanjako
- Students: 3,300 (2022)
- Undergraduates: 2,185 (2022)
- Postgraduates: 1,115 (2022)
- Location: Mulago Hill, Kampala, Uganda; 0°20′18″N 32°34′38″E
- Campus: Urban
- Website: Homepage
- Location in Kampala

Makerere University College of Health Sciences (MakCHS) is a constituent college of Makerere University, Uganda's oldest university. The schools of the college offer undergraduate and postgraduate courses in the biomedical sciences, health sciences, human medicine and public health, covering a broad range of disciplines and specialties.

== Location ==
The College campus is located on Mulago Hill, in northeast Kampala, Uganda's capital and largest city, approximately 4 kilometres (2 mi) north of the city's central business district. This is about 2.5 kilometres (2 mi) northeast of Makerere University Main Campus. The schools of the college are spread across the southern, western, northern and eastern parts of Mulago Hill and include Mulago Hospital Complex, the college's teaching hospital. The coordinates of the college are: 00°20'18.0"N 32°34'38.0"E (Latitude:0.338333; Longitude:32.577213).

== Overview ==
Makerere University College of Health Sciences, formerly named the Faculty of Medicine, Makerere University's medical school was established in 1924 as the oldest medical training institution in East and Central Africa https://pubmed.ncbi.nlm.nih.gov/36321129/ and https://pubmed.ncbi.nlm.nih.gov/14287327/. Its training programs expanded to include all health care professionals such as radiographers, nurses, pharmacists, dental surgeons, optometrists, biomedical engineers, speech and language therapists, cytotechnologists, bioinformaticians, etc., with 70 academic programs (undergraduate and graduate). Makerere University College of Health Science is headed by a Principal and a Deputy Principal. It consists of five schools, School of Medicine with 14 Departments, School of Biomedical Sciences with 9 departments, School of Public Health with 4 Departments, School of Health Sciences with 3 Departments and School of Dentistry. Each school is headed by a Dean. The Makerere University College of Health Sciences has a mission to improve the health of the people of Uganda through innovative teaching, research and provision of services responsive to society needs.

== Schools ==
As of June 2016, the following schools comprised the Makerere University College of Health Sciences:

- Makerere University School of Biomedical Sciences - MakSBS
- Makerere University School of Health Sciences - MakSHS
- Makerere University School of Medicine - MakSOM
- Makerere University School of Public Health - MakSPH
- Makerere University School of Dentistry - MakSD

== Undergraduate courses ==
The following undergraduate courses are offered at MakCHS. Instruction in most courses is carried out across several different schools within the college. The school responsible for awarding a particular qualification is indicated in bold letters.

- Bachelor of Science in Medical Radiography - MakSOM
- Bachelor of Science in Speech and Language Therapy - MakSOM
- Bachelor of Medicine and Bachelor of Surgery - MakSOM
- Bachelor of Science in Biomedical Engineering - MakSBS
- Bachelor of Cytotechnology - MakSBS
- Bachelor of Science in Biomedical Sciences - MakSBS
- Bachelor of Science in Nursing - MakSHS
- Bachelor of Pharmacy - MakSHS
- Bachelor of Dental Surgery - MakSD
- Bachelor of Optometry - MakSHS
- Bachelor of Science in Dental Laboratory Technology - MakSHS
- Bachelor of Environmental Health Sciences - MakSPH

== Graduate Courses ==
The following postgraduate courses are offered at MakCHS. Instruction is offered across several schools of the college. The school that is ultimately responsible for awarding the postgraduate degree is indicated in bold ink.

1. Master of Medicine (MMed) in Anesthesiology - **MakSOM**
2. Master of Medicine (MMed) in Family Medicine - **MakSOM**
3. Master of Medicine (MMed) in Internal Medicine -**MakSOM**
4. Master of Science (MSc) in Nursing - **MakSHS**
5. Master of Medicine (MMed) in Orthopaedic Surgery - **MakSOM**
6. Master of Medicine (MMed) in Obstetrics and Gynecology - **MakSOM**
7. Master of Medicine (MMed) in Ophthalmology - **MakSOM**
8. Master of Medicine (MMed) in Otolaryngology - **MakSOM**
9. Master of Medicine (MMed) in Pediatrics and Child Health - **MakSOM**
10. Master of Medicine (MMed) in Psychiatry - **MakSOM**
11. Master of Medicine (MMed) in General Surgery - **MakSOM**
12. Master of Science (MSc) in Pharmacology - **MakSBS**
13. Master of Medicine (MMed) in Radiology - **MakSOM**
14. Master of Medicine (MMed) in Microbiology - **MakSBS**
15. Master of Medicine (MMed) in Pathology - **MakSBS**
16. Master of Science (MSc) in Human Anatomy - **MakSBS**
17. Master of Science (MSc) in Clinical Epidemiology and Biostatistics - **MakSBS**
18. Master of Science (MSc) in Physiology - **MakSBS**
19. Master of Science (MSc) in Medical Illustration - **MakSBS**
20. Master of Science (MSc) in Allied Health Sciences - **MakSHS**
21. Master of Science (MSc) in Nursing - **MakSHS**
22. Master of Science (MSc) in Clinical Chemistry - **MakSBS**
23. Master of Pharmacy (MPharm) - **MakSHS**
24. Master of Dental Surgery (MDS) - **MakSHS**
25. Master of Public Health (MPH) - **MakSPH**
26. Doctor of Public Health (DrPH) - **MakSPH**
27. Doctor of Medicine (MD) - **MakSOM**
28. Doctor of Philosophy (PhD) - **All Schools of MakCHS**

In addition to the postgraduate degree courses, the College of Health Sciences at Makerere University offers several postgraduate courses including:

- Postgraduate Diploma in Anesthesiology - **MakSOM**
- Postgraduate Diploma in Quality of Health Care - **MakSPH**

== Albert Cook Memorial Library ==
The Albert Cook Memorial Library, also Albert Cook Medical Library is the main library of Makerere University College of Health Sciences. The library, named after Sir Albert Cook (22 March 1870 – 23 April 1951), the founder of Mulago Hospital and Mengo Hospital, was established in 1924, by Dr. Cook. The library houses an archive of Dr. Albert Cook's original handwritten patient notes dating back to 1900.

The library underwent a renovation in 1968 and another major renovation in 2018; the last one funded by a USh197 billion (US$52,000) grant from Stanbic Bank Uganda Limited, Uganda's largest commercial bank by assets.

== See also ==
- Education in Uganda
- Makerere University
- Medical Schools in Uganda
- Makerere University School of Biomedical Sciences
- Makerere University School of Health Sciences
- Makerere University School of Medicine
- Makerere University School of Public Health
