= Makerere University School of Medicine =

- Type: Public
- Established: 1924
- Affiliations: Makerere University
- Dean: Annet Olivia Nakimuli
- Location: Mulago Hill, Kampala, Uganda; 00°20′17″N 32°34′38″E
- Campus: Urban
- Location in Kampala

The Makerere University School of Medicine (MUSM) in Kampala, Uganda, also known as the Makerere University Medical School, is the school of medicine of Makerere University, Uganda's oldest and largest public university. The medical school has been part of Makerere University since 1924. The school provides medical education at diploma, undergraduate, and postgraduate levels.

== Location ==
The school's campus is located on Mulago Hill in north-east Kampala, Uganda's capital and largest city. The campus is approximately 4 kilometres (2.5 mi), north of the city's central business district. The pre-clinical disciplines of the medical school are integrated with the Makerere University School of Biomedical Sciences. The clinical teaching disciplines are integrated with the Mulago Hospital Complex and the Makerere University School of Public Health, all of which are also located on Mulago Hill.

== Overview ==
MUSM is one of the schools that comprise the Makerere University College of Health Sciences, a constituent semi-autonomous college of Makerere University. The college is headed by a principal and a deputy principal, while each school is headed by a dean.

== Departments ==
As of July 2022, MUSM's departments were:

- Department of Internal Medicine
- Department of Surgery
- Department of Obstetrics & Gynæcology
- Department of Psychiatry
- Department of Family Medicine
- Department of Anæsthesia
- Department of Ear Nose Throat
- Department of Ophthalmology
- Department of Orthopædics
- Department of Radiology & Radio Therapy
- Medical Research Centre
- Reproductive Health Unit
- Department of Pædiatrics & Child Health

== Undergraduate courses ==
The following undergraduate courses were offered as of July 2022:

- Bachelor of Medicine and Bachelor of Surgery
- Bachelor of Science in Radiography
- Bachelor of Science in Speech and Language Therapy
- Bachelor of Science in Palliative Care
- Diploma in Palliative Care

== Graduate courses ==
=== Master of Medicine ===
A clinical degree awarded following three or more years of instruction and examination in any of the following specialties:

- Master of Medicine
  - Anæsthesiology and Critical Care
  - Ear Nose Throat
  - Family Medicine
  - Internal Medicine
  - Obstetrics & Gynæcology
  - Ophthalmology
  - Orthopædic Surgery
  - Pædieatrics & Child Health
  - Psychiatry
  - Radiology
  - Surgery
  - Emergency Medicine
- Master of Science
  - Clinical Epidemiology & Biostatistics
  - Health Professions Education
- Doctor of Philosophy by course work and/or thesis

== Notable alumni ==
- Lulume Bayiga - Physician, politician, and member of parliament. Acting secretary general of the Democratic Party in Uganda.
- Kizza Besigye - Physician, politician, and leader of the Forum for Democratic Change political party in Uganda. Ugandan presidential candidate in 2001, 2006, and 2011.
- Gilbert Bukenya - Physician, professor of public health, politician, and farmer. Former vice-president of Uganda (2003–2011).
- Paul D'Arbela - Physician, academic, and medical researcher. Professor of medicine and dean of postgraduate studies at the Uganda Martyrs University Postgraduate School of Medicine based at St. Francis Hospital Nsambya in Nsambya, Kampala.
- Specioza Kazibwe - Surgeon, politician, and women's activist. Vice-president of Uganda from 1994 until 2003.
- Maggie Kigozi - Physician, businesswoman, sportswoman, and farmer. A management consultant at UNIDO. Former executive director of the Uganda Investment Authority.
- George Kirya - Academic, microbiologist, politician, and diplomat. Former vice-chancellor, Makerere University. Former Ugandan high commissioner to the United Kingdom. Chairman, Uganda's Health Services Commission.
- Samson Kisekka - Physician, politician, and diplomat. Prime minister of Uganda (1986–1991) and vice-president of Uganda (1991–1994).
- Crispus Kiyonga - Physician and politician. Minister of defense in the cabinet of Uganda (since 2006).
- Phyllis Kyomuhendo - Ugandan entrepreneur, innovator and the co-founder of m-SCAN, a mobile ultrasound device company.
- Stephen Mallinga - Physician and politician. Former minister for disaster relief and refugees in the cabinet of Uganda (2011–2013). of Uganda Martyrs University in Nkozi, Mpigi District.
- Harriet Mayanja-Kizza - Professor of internal medicine, clinical immunologist, and academic administrator. Dean of the School of Medicine at the Makerere University College of Health Sciences.
- Cissy Kityo Mutuluza - Physician, epidemiologist, medical researcher. Executive director of the Joint Clinical Research Centre. (Note: "Dr. Cissy Kityo Muuluza". Joint Clinical Research Centre. Archived from the original on 2022-07-07.)
- Josephine Nambooze was admitted to Makerere University School of Medicine to study human medicine (the first female in history of the school).
- Charles Olweny - Oncologist, academic, and medical researcher. Former professor of medicine at Makerere University Medical School and director of the Uganda Cancer Institute, Mulago, Kampala. Vice-chancellor of Uganda Martyrs University in Nkozi, Mpigi District.
- Christine Ondoa - Pediatrician, administrator, and pastor. Former minister of health in Uganda (2011–2013). Chairperson of the Uganda AIDS Commission (since 2014).
- Emmanuel Otala - Physician and politician. Former minister of state for labor in the cabinet of Uganda (2009–2011).
- Ruhakana Rugunda - Physician, politician, and diplomat. Minister of health in the Ugandan cabinet (since 2013).
- David Serwadda - Professor of public health and dean of the Makerere University School of Public Health (since 2007).
- Nelson Sewankambo - Physician, professor of medicine, and medical researcher. Principal, Makerere University College of Health Sciences (since 2007).
- Jeremiah Twa-Twa - Physician, politician, and former elected member of parliament for Iki-Iki County, Budaka District (2011–2016).
- Fred Wabwire-Mangen - Physician, public health specialist, and medical researcher. Professor of epidemiology and head of the department of epidemiology and biostatistics at the Makerere University School of Public Health.

== See also ==
- Education in Uganda
- List of medical schools in Uganda
