= Master of Medicine =

Academic degree in healthcare

Master of Medicine (MMed, MM) is a postgraduate professional clinical degree awarded by medical schools to physicians following a period of instruction, supervised clinical rotations, and examination.

== Australia ==
=== University of Queensland ===
The following MMed courses are available at the University of Queensland.

- General practice
- Primary care skin cancer medicine

=== University of Sydney ===
The following MMed courses are available at the University of Sydney.

- Ophthalmology
- Sleep medicine
- Child and adolescent health
- Critical care medicine

=== Monash University ===
The following MMed courses are available at the Monash University.

- Perioperative medicine

== P. R. China ==
Chinese Universities in collaboration with their affiliated hospitals award two categories of master's degrees of medicine: specialty MMed or academic MMed degrees. Specialty MMed degrees are awarded after a supervised rotational training in the university's affiliated teaching hospitals and lead to registration as a specialist. Academic MMed degrees on the other hand are research and basic sciences oriented, focusing more on medical laboratory research. Both qualifications are acceptable prerequisites for PhD enrollment. The entry requirements of both specialty and academic MMed programs are MBBS or related undergraduate medical qualifications.

Graduates of specialty MMed qualifications can either choose to practise as specialist physicians and surgeons in their respective specialties or undergo subspecialty PhD/fellowship training leading to an advanced specialisation practice as consultants. The most important condition for gaining admission into MMed program is the availability of supervising professors or consultants who are willing to mentor the student.

== Guyana ==
=== Texila American University ===
The following MMed courses are available at Texila American University:

- Pediatrics
- Psychiatry
- Pathology
- Surgery
- Anesthesia
- Ear nose and throat surgery
- Diagnostic radiology
- Obstetrics and gynecology
- Immunology
- Internal medicine
- Neurology
- Dermatology
- Emergency medicine
- Ophthalmology
- Orthopaedics
- Forensic medicine
- Human anatomy & histo-embryology

== Kenya ==
=== University of Nairobi ===
Various MMed courses are available at University of Nairobi and Moi University.

== Malaysia ==
=== University of Malaya ===
- Clinical pathology
- Medical physics
- Internal medicine
- Emergency medicine
- Clinical oncology
- Anesthesiologist
- Medical science
- Nursing science
- Obstetrics & gynaecology
- Psychiatry
- Paediatrics
- Paediatrics surgery
- Otorhinolaryngology

=== Universiti Sains Malaysia ===
==== Medical based programs ====
- Anaesthesiology
- Emergency medicine
- Family medicine
- Internal medicine
- Paediatrics
- Psychiatry
- Radiology

==== Surgical based programs ====
- Obstetrics and gynaecology
- Ophthalmology
- Orthopaedics
- Otorhinolaryngology
- Surgery
- Neurosurgery
- Plastic surgery

== Singapore ==
The Master of Medicine is conferred by the National University of Singapore (NUS) Division of Graduate Medical Studies.

- Internal medicine
- Surgery (may be taken jointly with the MRCS examinations)
- Pediatrics
- Obstetrics & gynaecology
- Occupational medicine
- Public health
- Psychiatry
- Family medicine
- Diagnostic radiology
- Orthopaedic surgery
- Otorhinolaryngology
- Emergency medicine

== Sweden ==
=== Karolinska Institutet ===
The following MMed courses are available at the Karolinska Institutet

- Public health sciences

=== Umea University ===
The following MMed courses are available at the Umea University

- Biomedical engineering

=== KTH Royal Institute of Technology ===
The following MMed courses are available at the KTH RIT

- Technology, work and health

=== Lund University ===
The following MMed courses are available at the Lund University

- Public health sciences

== United Kingdom ==
=== University of Dundee ===
The following MMed courses are available at the University of Dundee

- Medical educations

=== Edge Hill University ===
The following MMed courses are available at the Edge Hill University

- Acute medicine
- Adult and later life psychiatry
- Breast radiology
- Pain management
- Interventional cardiology
- Clinical microbiology and virology
- Cross-sectional imaging
- Forensic psychiatry

=== University of Buckingham ===
The following MMed courses are available at the University of Buckingham

- General medicine

== South Africa ==
=== University of Cape Town ===
The following MMed courses are available at the University of Cape Town

- Occupational medicine
- Public health
- Anesthesia
- Anatomical pathology
- Haematology
- Internal medicine
- Microbiology and immunology
- Obstetrics and gynecology
- Ophthalmology
- Orthopedics
- Otorhinolaryngology
- Pediatrics
- Psychiatry
- Radiology
- Radiation oncology
- Surgery

=== University of Pretoria ===
The following MMed courses are available at the University of Pretoria

- Anaesthesiology
- Dermatology
- Emergency medicine
- Family medicine
- Geriatrics
- Internal medicine
- Medical oncology
- Neurology
- Neurosurgery
- Nuclear medicine
- Obstetrics and gynaecology
- Ophthalmology
- Orthopaedics
- Otorhinolaryngology
- Paediatrics
- Anatomical pathology
- Chemical pathology
- Clinical pathology
- Forensic pathology
- Haematology
- Medical microbiology
- Medical virology
- Plastic surgery
- Psychiatry
- Public health
- Radiation oncology
- Diagnostic radiology
- Surgery
- Paediatric surgery
- Thoracic surgery
- Urology
- MMilMed – Master of military medicine

== Tanzania ==
=== Muhimbili University ===
The following MMed courses are available at Muhimbili University:

- Anesthesiology
- Anatomical pathology
- Clinical oncology
- Emergency medicine
- Haematology
- Internal medicine
- Microbiology and immunology
- Obstetrics and gynecology
- Ophthalmology
- Orthopedics and trauma
- Otorhinolaryngology
- Pediatrics
- Psychiatry
- Radiology
- Surgery
- Urology

=== University of Dodoma ===
The following MMed courses are available at University of Dodoma:

- Internal medicine
- Microbiology and immunology
- Obstetrics and gynecology
- Pediatrics
- Psychiatry
- Surgery

=== Kilimanjaro Christian Medical University College ===
The following MMed courses are available at Kilimanjaro Christian Medical University College:

- Anesthesiology
- Dermato-venereology
- Internal medicine
- Obstetrics and gynecology
- Ophthalmology
- Orthopedics and trauma
- Otorhinolaryngology
- Pediatrics
- Diagnostic radiology
- Surgery
- Urology

=== Catholic University of Health and Allied Sciences ===
The following MMed courses are available at Catholic University of Health and Allied Sciences:

- Anatomical pathology
- Internal medicine
- Obstetrics and gynecology
- Orthopedics and trauma
- Pediatrics
- Surgery

== Uganda ==
=== Gulu University ===
The following MMed courses are available at Gulu University School of medicine:

- Surgery
- Psychiatry

=== Makerere University ===
The following MMed courses are available at Makerere University School of medicine:

- Anesthesiology and critical care
- Family medicine
- Internal medicine
- Medical oncology
- Neurosurgery
- Obstetrics and gynecology
- Ophthalmology
- Otolaryngology
- Pediatrics
- Psychiatry
- Surgery
- Surgical oncology
- Urology

=== Mbarara University ===
The following MMed courses are available at Mbarara University School of medicine:

- Internal medicine
- Obstetrics and gynecology
- Pediatrics
- Surgery
- Plastic & reconstructive surgery

=== Uganda Martyrs University ===
The following MMed courses are available at Uganda Martyrs University School of medicine:

- Internal medicine
- Obstetrics and gynecology
- Pediatrics
- Surgery
- Emergency medicine

=== Kampala International University ===
The following MMed courses are available at Kampala International University

- Internal medicine
- Obstetrics and gynecology
- Pediatrics
- Surgery
- Psychiatry

=== Busitema University ===
Busitema university has a Master of Medicine in internal medicine.

== Zambia ==
=== University of Zambia ===
The following MMed courses are available at University of Zambia:

- Pediatrics
- Clinical pathology
- Psychiatry
- Internal medicine
- Infectious diseases
- General surgery
- Urology
- Orthopaedics and trauma
- Obstetrics and gynecology
- Family medicine
- Ophthalmology
- Otorhinolaryngology
- Anaesthesiology
- Neurology

== Zimbabwe ==
=== University of Zimbabwe ===
The following MMed courses are available at University of Zimbabwe:

- Medicine
- Anaesthetics
- Obstetrics & gynaecology
- Paediatrics
- Surgery
- Neurosurgery
- Urology
- Otorhinolaryngology
- Medicine
- Psychiatry
- Ophthalmology
- Histopathology
- Radiotherapy and oncology

== Democratic Republic of the Congo ==
=== University of Lubumbashi ===
The following MMed courses are available

- Medicine
- Anaesthetics
- Obstetrics & gynaecology
- Paediatrics
- Surgery
- Medicine
- Psychiatry
- Ophthalmology
- Histopathology

=== University of Kinshasa ===
- Medicine
- Anaesthetics
- Obstetrics & gynaecology
- Paediatrics
- Surgery
- Neurosurgery
- Urology
- Otorhinolaryngology
- Medicine
- Psychiatry
- Ophthalmology
- Histopathology

== See also ==
- Medical education
