= Mulago National Specialised Hospital =

Public tertiary care facility in Uganda

- Uganda Ministry of Health
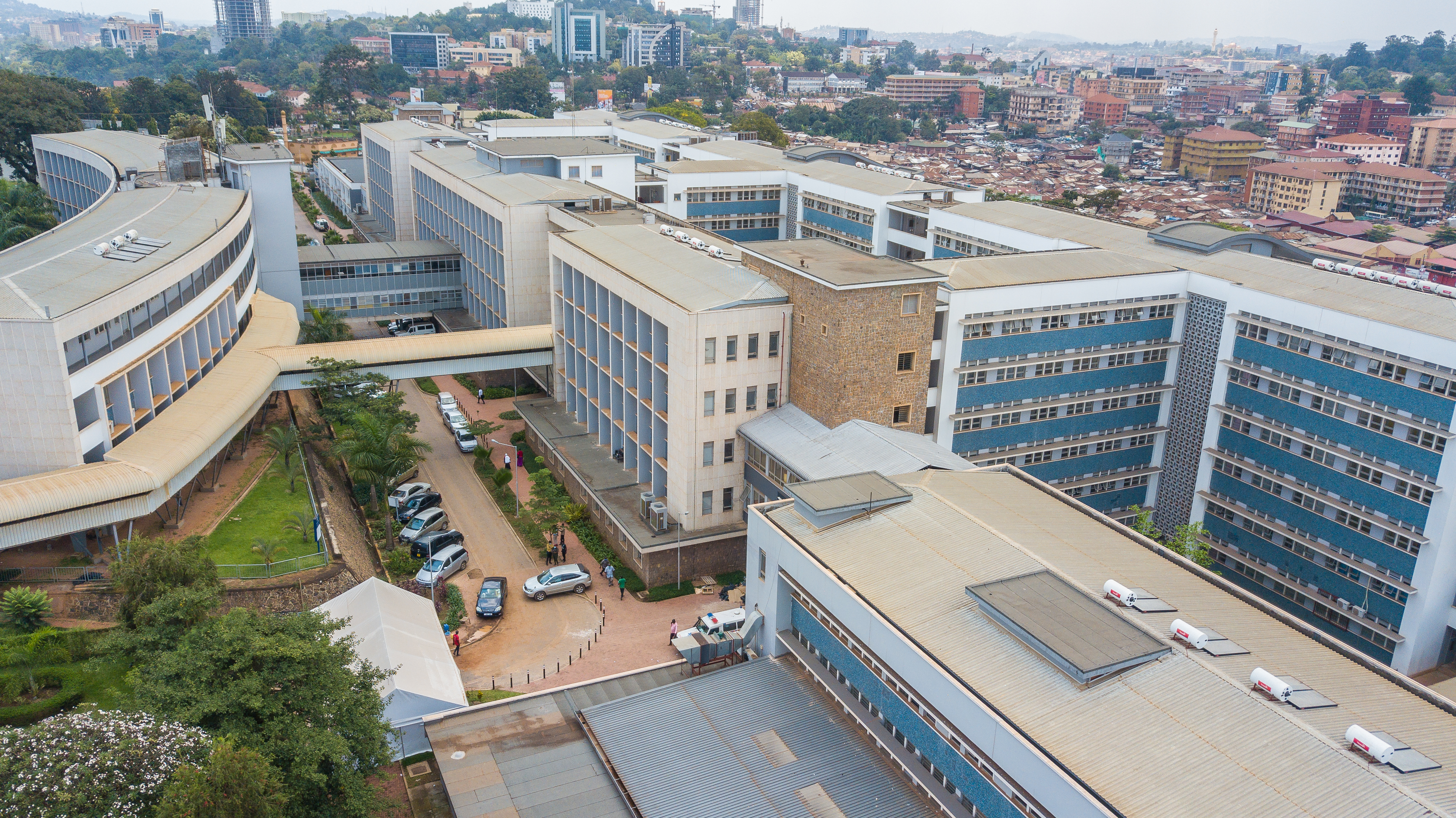

Geography
- Location: Mulago, Kampala, Uganda
- Coordinates: 00°20′16″N 32°34′32″E

Organisation
- Care system: Public
- Type: General and Teaching
- Affiliated university: Makerere University College of Health Sciences

Services
- Emergency department: I
- Beds: 1,000

History
- Founded: 1913; 113 years ago

Links
- Lists: Hospitals in Uganda
- Other links: Hospitals in Uganda; Medical education in Uganda

Mulago National Specialised Hospital, also known as Mulago National Referral Hospital, is a component of Mulago Hospital Complex, the teaching facility of Makerere University College of Health Sciences, in Kampala, Uganda. It is the largest public hospital in Uganda.

== Location ==
The hospital is on Mulago Hill in the northern part of the city of Kampala, immediately west of the Makerere University College of Health Sciences. It is approximately 5 kilometres (3 mi) north-east of Kampala's central business district. The geographical coordinates of the hospital are 0°20'16.0"N, 32°34'32.0"E (Latitude:0.337786; Longitude:32.575550).

== Overview ==
This hospital, together with adjacent, affiliated hospitals and institutions, constitutes Mulago Hospital Complex, the teaching facility of the Makerere University College of Health Sciences. The hospital offers services in most medical and surgical subspecialties, in addition to dentistry, emergency medicine, pediatrics, and intensive care. Some of the hospital's major departments are structurally located distant from each other with the foremost instances being Kiruddu Referral Hospital and Kawempe Referral Hospital, which are kilometers away from the main hospital complex.

== History ==
Old Mulago Hospital was founded in 1913 by Albert Ruskin Cook. New Mulago Hospital was completed in 1962. The new Mulago Hospital was built by the British colonial government as a parting legacy project.The hospital has an official capacity of 1,790 beds, although it often houses over 3,000 patients. In 2012, the annual hospital budget was USh33.2 billion. "Apparently, to run effectively, Mulago needs thrice its current budget." Uganda's first female neurosurgeon, Juliet Sekabunga Nalwanga, trained and is employed there. During the Entebbe Hostage Crisis in late June and early July 1976, one of the hostages, Dora Bloch, became ill and was taken from Entebbe Airport to Mulago Hospital. After the rescue of the hostages from the airport terminal during Operation Entebbe on 4 July 1976, she was taken from her hospital bed and was murdered on Idi Amin's orders.

== Mulago Hospital Complex ==
Mulago Hospital Complex is a term used to refer to the hospitals on Mulago Hill and the adjacent and affiliated medical institutions that serve as the teaching entity for Makerere University College of Health Science. As of April 2020, the complex housed an estimated 1,800 hospital beds. These units of the complex include the following:

- Old Mulago Hospital with 200 beds
- Mulago Women's Referral Hospital with 450 beds
- Mulago National Specialized Hospital with 1,000 beds
- Infectious Diseases Institute*
- Uganda Heart Institute**
- Uganda Cancer Institute** with 80 beds

Note 1*: Infectious Diseases Institute is a component of Makerere University.
Note 2**: Uganda Cancer Institute and Uganda Heart Institute are self-accounting bodies, separate from Mulago Hospital.

Some credible sources reserve the term to refer to only the combination of (a) Old Mulago Hospital (b) Mulago Women's Referral Hospital and (c) Mulago National Specialized Hospital.

== Renovations ==
In October 2014, major renovations and rehabilitation works commenced at the hospital, the purpose of which was to bring about structural and performance improvements. These works, estimated to last 24 months, were the largest renovation works to the facility since the New Mulago (Lower Mulago) hospital block was completed 52 years earlier.

The work was budgeted to cost US$29 million and the equipment was budgeted to cost US$20 million (sub-total US$49 million), financed by a loan from the African Development Bank. The government of Uganda had to co-fund US$9.5 million, bringing total cost to US$54.5 million. As part of the planned changes, the intensive care unit was enlarged from 7 beds to 41 beds, of which 27 are adult beds and 14 are pediatric beds. The mortuary was expanded from 16 to 160 slots; and, the number of operating theatres were increased from 7 to 22. Other changes include the decrease of total beds from 1,500 to 1,000. Of those, 900 beds are general inpatient beds, 6 are platinum beds for high net-worth individuals, 45 are gold rooms, and 49 are VVIP rooms. There will be a fee for service, the nature and amount to be determined by cabinet.

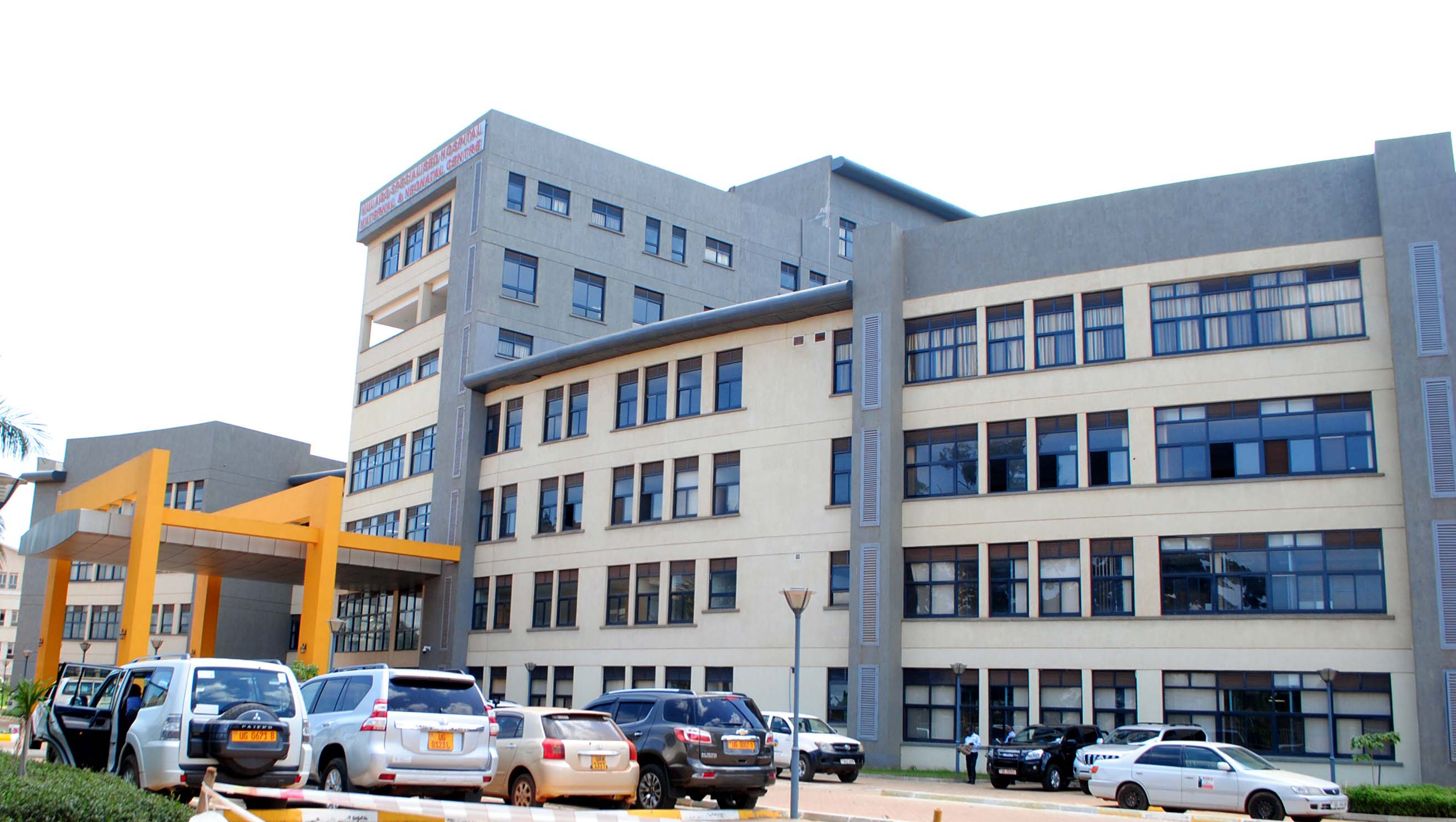
Mulago Specialised Hospital Maternal and Neonatal center

In May 2019, the Cabinet of Uganda authorized the release of USh35.5 billion (US$9.5 million) to complete the renovations to the hospital. As of that date, the pending work, estimated at 8 percent of the total, included new windows, an ICT network installation, 6 new subterranean tanks, and expansion of the road network within the hospital complex. Once the funds are released, work is expected to take five months to completion. Completion is expected later in 2020.

== See also ==
- List of hospitals in Uganda
- Makerere University Medical School
- Kampala Capital City Authority
- List of medical schools in Uganda
