= List of Makerere University academics =

This is the list the notable academics and alumni of Makerere University, the oldest university in Uganda. It is limited to those with articles in Wikipedia.

== A ==
- Eric Adriko
- Thomas Aisu
- Rubby Opio Aweri

== B ==
- Waswa Balunywa
- Noble Banadda
- Venansius Baryamureeba
- William Bazeyo
- Gilbert Bukenya
- Abed Bwanika
- Pauline Byakika

== C ==
- William Canby
- Colin Chapman
- David Cook

== D ==
- Paul D'Arbela
- Hugh Dinwiddy

== E ==
- Les Ebdon
- Moses Ebuk
- Eric Berry Edney

== F ==
- Oliver Furley

== G ==
- Arthur Gakwandi

== H ==
- Denis Hills

== I ==
- Charles Ibingira
- Richard Idro
- Robert Ikoja-Odongo

== J ==
- John F. Mugisha

== K ==
- Charles Kabugo
- Werikhe Kafabusa
- Mondo Kagonyera
- Senteza Kajubi
- Richard Kanyerezi
- James Katorobo
- Elly Katunguka
- Nehemiah Katusiime
- Lawrence Kazibwe
- Maggie Kigozi
- Sarah Kiguli

== L ==
- Peter Lwabi

== M ==
- Kiddu Makubuya
- Philemon Mateke
- Ali Mazrui
- Abigaba Cuthbert Mirembe
- Joseph Mugisha
- Maud Kamatenesi Mugisha
- Florence Muranga

== N ==
- Evelyn Nabunya
- Jolly Nankunda
- Barnabas Nawangwe
- Grace Ndeezi
- Apolo Nsibambi
- Augustus Nuwagaba
- Stella Nyanzi

== O ==
- Celestino Obua
- Ponsiano Ocama
- Benjamin Josses Odoki
- Wafula Oguttu
- Charles Olweny
- Anne Atai Omoruto
- Jackson Orem
- Mark Ouma
- Denis Owen
- Raphael Owor

== P ==
- Okot p'Bitek

== R ==
- John Ruganda

== S ==
- Samuel Sejjaaka
- Hakim Sendagire
- David Serwadda

== T ==
- Hilda Tadria
- Sylvia Tamale
- Justinian Tamusuza

== W ==
- Fred Wabwire-Mangen
- John Walugembe
- Timothy Wangusa
- Rhoda Wanyenze
- Denis Williams
