= Kenneth Ocen Obwot =

Ugandan physician and military officer

Brigadier Kenneth Ocen Obwot
- Born: 1954 (age 71–72); Gulu District, Uganda
- Citizenship: Uganda
- Education: Makerere University (Bachelor of Medicine and Bachelor of Surgery) (Master of Medicine in Internal Medicine); University of Wales College of Medicine (Diploma in Dermatology) (Master of Science in Dermatology) (Postgraduate Diploma in Health Management)
- Occupations: Physician, Dermatologist, Military Officer
- Years active: 1980–present
- Known for: Military Matters
- Title: Deputy Director of Medical Services in the Uganda People's Defence Forces

Brigadier Kenneth Ocen Obwot, is a Ugandan physician, military officer and medical administrator in the Uganda People's Defence Forces (UPDF). He serves as the Deputy Director of Medical Services in the UPDF.

== Background and education ==
He was born in the Acholi sub-region of the Northern Region of Uganda circa 1954. After attending local elementary and secondary schools, he was admitted to Makerere University, Uganda's oldest and largest public university in 1974. He entered Makerere University School of Medicine, graduating with a Bachelor of Medicine and Bachelor of Surgery degree, in 1979. In 1990, he obtained a Master of Medicine in Internal Medicine, also from Makerere University.

In 1996, he was admitted to the Cardiff University School of Medicine (at that time University of Wales College of Medicine), where he graduated with a Diploma in Dermatology. The following year he obtained a Master of Science degree in Dermatology. Later, in 2000, he successfully studied for a Postgraduate Diploma in Health Management, from the same university. He specialized in dermatology (skin diseases).

== Career ==
Dr Ocen Obwot, when on military duty, is based at Bombo Military Hospital, in Luweero District. In February 2019, as part of a promotions exercise that involved 2,031 UPDF men and women, Dr. Kenneth Ocen Obwot was promoted from the rank of colonel to that of brigadier general.

== See also ==
- Stephen Kusasira
- Magid Kagimu
- Thomas Aisu
- Churchill Lukwiya Onen
