= Robert Ssentongo =

Robert Ssentongo may refer to:

- Robert Ssentongo (footballer) (born 1988), Ugandan footballer
- Robert Ssentongo (surgeon), Ugandan plastic surgeon
