= Naguru General Hospital =

- Uganda Ministry of Health and Kampala Capital City Authority

Geography
- Location: Naguru, Nakawa Division, Kampala, Central Region, Uganda
- Coordinates: 00°19′44″N 32°36′24″E

Organisation
- Care system: Public
- Type: General

Services
- Emergency department: III
- Beds: 100

History
- Founded: 2012

Links
- Other links: Hospitals in Uganda

Naguru General Hospital, also known as China-Uganda Friendship Hospital Naguru, is a hospital in Uganda. It is an urban, general hospital built between 2009 and 2012, at an estimated cost of approximately US$8 million (UGX:20 billion). The hospital was built by the Government of China, as a gift to the Government of Uganda.

The hospital is on Naguru Road, on Naguru Hill, Nakawa Division, Kampala District, in Kampala, the capital of Uganda and the largest city in that country. This location lies approximately 4 kilometres (2 mi), by road, east of the central business district of Kampala.

== Overview ==
The Chinese government, designed and built the hospital as a gift to the people of Uganda, at a cost of US$8 million (UGX:20 billion). Kampala Capital City Authority (KCCA), donated the 5-acre (2.0 ha) site where the hospital was built. The government of Uganda contributed an estimated US$2 million (UGX:4.8 billion) in tax waivers on construction materials used to build the hospital, landscaping, road access and licensing fees.

The institution which was completed in December 2011, consists of seven buildings, four operating rooms, a maternity ward, a pediatric unit, a teenage center (adolescent health unit), a blood bank, radiology department (including a CT scanner) and housing for medical staff. The hospital was officially handed over to the Government of Uganda on 10 January 2012, to be jointly administered by the Uganda Ministry of Health and Kampala Capital City Authority (KCCA).

== Target population ==
The hospital is intended to serve, primarily the residents of (a) Nakawa Division (b) Kampala Metropolitan Area and (c) Other Ugandans. Naguru General Hospital is also meant to decongest Mulago National Referral Hospital, the only general public hospital serving an estimated 3 million inhabitants of the Kampala Metropolitan Area. Plans are underway by the Government of Uganda to construct a general hospital in each of the five divisions of Kampala, by 2016. In June 2014, construction of the hospital's staff quarters began in the Kireka neighborhood in Kira Municipality, Wakiso District, approximately 7 kilometres (4 mi), east of Naguru. The hospital employs 356 staff led by the executive director, Doctor Edward Naddumba.

== See also ==
- Uganda Hospitals
- Kawempe General Hospital
- Kiruddu General Hospital
- Mulago National Referral Hospital
