= Nehemiah Katusiime =

Ugandan obstetrician and gynecologist

- Born: Uganda
- Education: Makerere University (Bachelor of Medicine and Bachelor of Surgery) (Master of Medicine in Obstetrics and Gynecology)
- Occupations: Physician; Academic; Medical Administrator
- Known for: Medical expertise, Leadership
- Title: Executive Director of Kawempe General Hospital

Nehemiah Katusiime is an Ugandan consultant obstetrician and gynecologist in the Uganda Ministry of Health. He was the executive director of Kawempe General Hospital, in Kawempe Division, in northern Kampala, the capital and largest of Uganda. He was appointed to that position on 9 August 2018 and was succeeded by Dr. Byaruhanga Emmanuel Kayogoza also a senior consultant Gynaecology and Obstetrics as the new Executive Director since his appointment in June 2022.

== Background and education ==
He was born in the Western Region of Uganda. After attending local schools, he was admitted to Makerere University to study human medicine, graduating with a Bachelor of Medicine and Bachelor of Surgery (MBChB) degree. He followed that with a Master of Medicine (MMed) degree in Obstetrics and Gynecology, also from Makerere University.

== Career ==
Dr. Nehemiah Katusiime is a consultant, who was attached to Mulago National Referral Hospital, Uganda's top and largest tertiary referral hospital, with a 1790 bed capacity, which also serves as the teaching hospital of Makerere University College of Health Sciences. Mulago National Referral Hospital is reported to have the busiest labor ward in the world, with over 30,000 live births annually, averaging 32,654 annually in the three years from 1 January 2011 until 31 December 2013. This is an average of approximately 90 deliveries every day, or 3.7 births per hour, including about 20 to 25 daily Caesarean sections.

In 2016, New Mulago Hospital transferred the gynecology ward and delivery suites (labour ward) to the newly-completed Kawempe General Hospital, to allow for the renovation and upgrade to the New Mulago Complex.

In August 2018, Nehemiah Katusiime, MBChB, MMed (Obstetrics and Gynecology), was appointed executive director of Kawempe General Hospital, a 200-bed facility, affiliated with Mulago Hospital. He will be deputized by Dr. Lawrence Kazibwe.

== See also ==
- Kiruddu General Hospital
- Mulago National Referral Hospital
- Makerere University College of Health Sciences
