= Idro =

Idro may refer to:

Places, Italy

- Idro, Lombardy, a comune in the Province of Brescia
- Lake Idro (or Lago d’Idro), a subalpine lake in the Provinces of Brescia and Trento

Organisations

- IDRO, Industrial Development and Renovation Organization of Iran
- IDRO, Internal Dobrujan Revolutionary Organisation

People

- Richard Idro, a Ugandan pediatric neurologist.
