= Ndagire =

Ndagire is a surname. Notable people with the surname include:

- Florence Ndagire (born 1984), Ugandan lawyer
- Mariam Ndagire (born 1971), Ugandan singer, actress, playwright, film director, and producer
- Specioza Kimera Ndagire, Ugandan businesswoman
