= Mohamed Yakub Janabi =

Tanzanian cardiologist (born 1962)

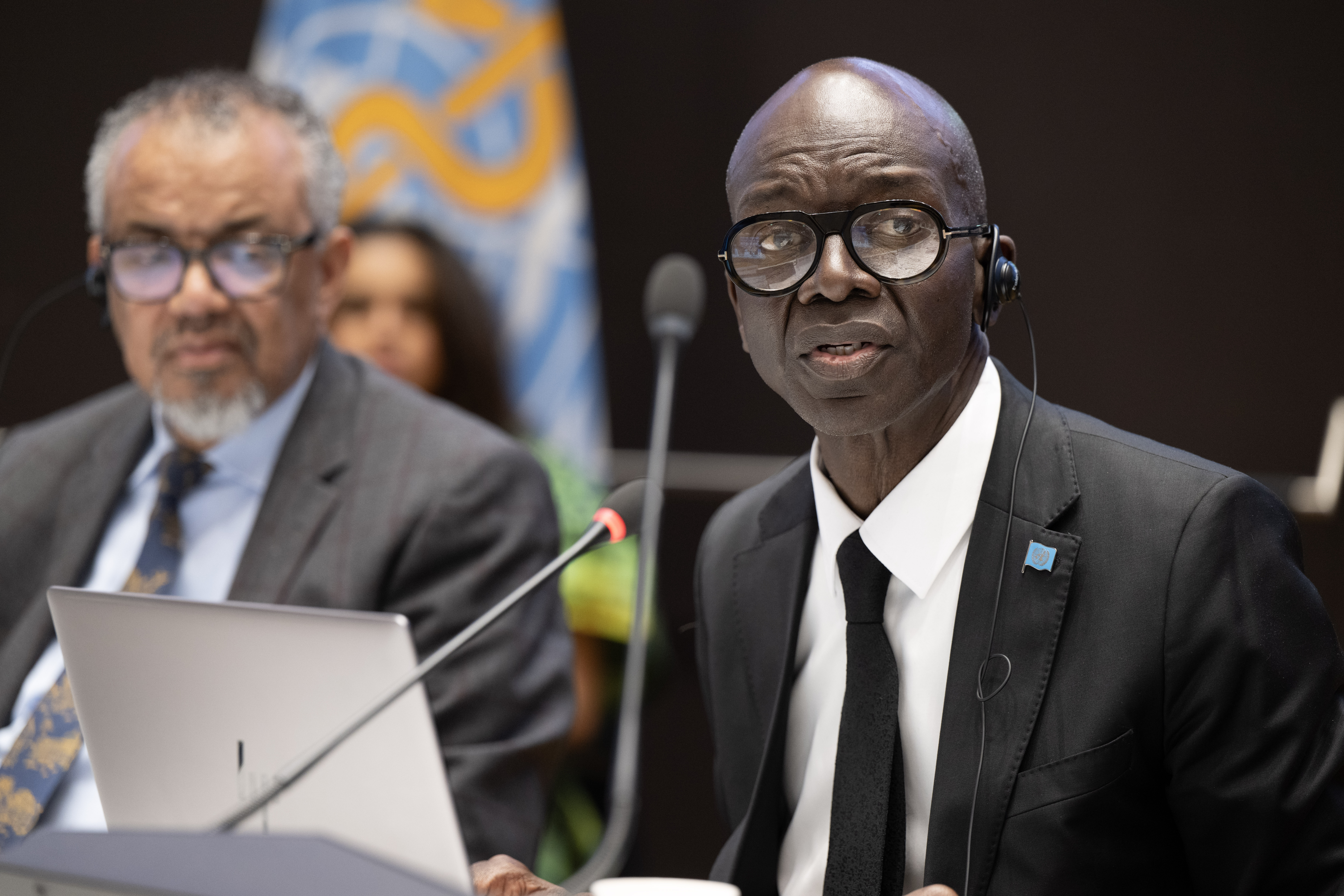

Regional Director of the WHO Regional Office for Africa
- Incumbent
- Assumed office 30 June 2025
- Preceded by: Matshidiso Moeti

Personal details
- Born: 25 December 1962 (age 63) Moshi, Kilimanjaro, Tanzania
- Education: Kharkiv Medical Institute; University of Queensland; Osaka University
- Occupation: Cardiologist, Public health expert, Presidential health advisor
- Known for: Regional Director; WHO Regional Office for Africa

Mohamed Yakub Janabi (born 25 December 1962) is a Tanzanian cardiologist, public health expert, and the Regional Director of the World Health Organization African Region (WHO-AFRO). He has over 30 years of experience in medicine, health policy, and international health diplomacy. Before his election in May 2025, he served as the Executive Director of Muhimbili National Hospital (MNH), Tanzania’s largest public hospital, and as a senior health advisor to the President of Tanzania. He assumed office as WHO Regional Director on 30 June 2025.

== Early life and education ==
Janabi was born on 25 December 1962 in Moshi, located in the Kilimanjaro Region of northern Tanzania. He earned his Doctor of Medicine (MD) from Kharkiv Medical Institute in Ukraine in 1989. In 1994, he obtained a Master's degree in Tropical Medicine (MSc) from the University of Queensland in Australia. He later earned a PhD in cardiology from Osaka University in Japan in 2000. He also completed a Postdoctoral Fellowship in cardiology at Osaka University Hospital in 2004.

== Medical and administrative career ==
After returning to Tanzania, Janabi was appointed as the personal physician to the President in 2005. From 2015 to 2022, he served as the Executive Director of the Jakaya Kikwete Cardiac Institute (JKCI). Under his leadership, JKCI became a regional center of excellence in cardiovascular treatment and research, helping reduce overseas medical referrals by over 95%.

In October 2022, Janabi was appointed Executive Director of Muhimbili National Hospital, the country's largest referral and teaching hospital, with over 4,000 beds. His leadership has been noted for expanding services and enhancing operational efficiency at the national health institution.

== International engagement and policy advisory ==
Janabi has advised multiple Tanzanian presidents, including former President Jakaya Kikwete and current President Samia Suluhu Hassan, on matters of health policy and health system reforms. He was a member of the United Nations High-Level Panel on the 2014–2016 Ebola outbreak. He has also worked closely with international organizations such as the Bill & Melinda Gates Foundation, Africa Centres for Disease Control and Prevention (Africa CDC), and the United States Centers for Disease Control and Prevention (CDC), focusing on pandemic preparedness and health security in Tanzania.

== WHO-AFRO candidacy ==
In March 2025, Janabi was nominated by the Tanzanian government as the official candidate for the position of WHO Regional Director for Africa. He succeeded Matshidiso Moeti, following the unexpected passing of Regional Director-elect Faustine Ndugulile. During the interim period, Chikwe Ihekweazu served as Acting Regional Director. Janabi's vision for African health systems is based on four strategic pillars: achieving universal health coverage, building health system resilience, leveraging modern technology, and promoting sustainable and self-reliant health institutions.

== Awards and memberships ==
Janabi is an adjunct faculty member at Muhimbili University of Health and Allied Sciences (MUHAS) and the University of South Carolina, USA. He is a Fellow of the American College of Cardiology (FACC) and a certified Aviation Medical Examiner approved by the United States Federal Aviation Administration (FAA-USA).

== Personal life ==
Janabi is multilingual, fluent in Swahili, English, Russian, and Japanese. He is married and has children.

== Selected publications ==
- Janabi, Mohamed; Yamashita, Shizuya; Hirano, Ken-ichi; Sakai, Naohiko; Hiraoka, Hisatayo; Matsumoto, Kengo; Zhang, Zhongyan; Nozaki, Shuichi; Matsuzawa, Yuji (August 2000). "Oxidized LDL–Induced NF-κB Activation and Subsequent Expression of Proinflammatory Genes Are Defective in Monocyte-Derived Macrophages From CD36-Deficient Patients". Arteriosclerosis, Thrombosis, and Vascular Biology. 20 (8): 1953–1960. doi:10.1161/01.ATV.20.8.1953. ISSN 1079-5642. PMID 10938017.
- Pallangyo, Pedro; Millinga, Jalack; Bhalia, Smita; Mkojera, Zabella; Misidai, Nsajigwa; Swai, Happiness J.; Hemed, Naairah R.; Kaijage, Alice; Janabi, Mohamed (21 February 2020). "Medication adherence and survival among hospitalized heart failure patients in a tertiary hospital in Tanzania: a prospective cohort study". BMC Research Notes. 13 (1): 89. doi:10.1186/s13104-020-04959-w. ISSN 1756-0500. PMC 7035643. PMID 32085803.

== See also ==
- Ahunna Eziakonwa

Preceded by Matshidiso Moeti; 2015–2025	WHO Regional Director for Africa; 2025–present	Succeeded by incumbent
