= Robert Ssentongo (surgeon) =

Ugandan consultant plastic surgeon

- Born: Uganda
- Citizenship: Ugandan
- Education: Makerere University (Bachelor of Medicine and Bachelor of Surgery) (Master of Medicine in Surgery); Manipal Academy of Higher Education (Two Year Residency in Plastic Surgery)
- Occupation: Consultant Plastic Surgeon
- Years active: 2003 — present
- Known for: Surgical skill
- Title: Deputy Executive Director; Kiruddu General Hospital

Robert Ssentongo, is a consultant plastic surgeon in the Uganda Ministry of Health, who serves as the deputy executive director of Kiruddu General Hospital, in Makindye Division, in southern Kampala, the capital and largest city of Uganda. He was appointed to that position on 9 August 2018.

== Background ==
Ssentongo was born in the Buganda Region of Uganda. He attended Bishop’s Primary School Mukono West for his elementary schooling. He transferred to Bishop Senior School Mukono for his secondary education.

He was admitted to Makerere University Medical School, graduating with a Bachelor of Medicine and Bachelor of Surgery (MBChB). He went on to obtain, from the same medical school, a Master of Medicine (MMed) degree in Surgery. Later, between 2001 and 2003, he spent two continuous years attending a residency in plastic surgery at the Manipal Academy of Higher Education, in Bangalore, India.

== Career ==
For at least 15 years, since 2003, Dr. Ssentongo has worked as a plastic surgeon at Mulago National Referral Hospital, rising to the rank of Senior Consultant, by 2015. In that capacity, he served as the lead consultant plastic surgeon at the hospital’s burns unit.

He has concurrently worked with the international non-profit, SmileTrain. He also maintains privileges at Nakasero Hospital, a private hospital, as the sole plastic surgeon on staff, as of August 2018.

In August 2018, the Uganda Ministry of Health, appointed Dr. Robert Ssentongo as the deputy executive director of Kiruddu General Hospital. He will deputize Dr. Charles Kabugo, a senior consultant physician.

== See also ==
- Charles Kabugo
- John Omagino
- Jackson Orem
