= Diagnosis: Dissent =

2023 historical feature film

- Directed by: Denys Tarasov
- Written by: Kseniia Zastavska; Oleksandr Hlasenko
- Produced by: Valeriia Ivanenko; Artem Koliubaiev; Taras Bosak
- Starring: Kostiantyn Temliak; Irma Vitovska-Vantsa; Serhiy Kalantai; Ostap Stupka; Vitaliy Salii; Andriy Mostrenko; Pavlo Kostitsyn; Serhiy Kysil; Anastasiia Pustovit; Nataliia Babenko; Viktor Zhdanov
- Cinematography: Yevhenii Kyrei
- Edited by: Mikael Torgomian
- Music by: Hosein Mirzagoli
- Production companies: Joint Victory Production LLC; FILM.UA Group; Mountain Bear Production
- Distributed by: FILM.UA Distribution; Kinomania
- Release date: 13 October 2023
- Country: Ukraine
- Languages: Ukrainian; Russian
- Budget: ₴20 million
- Box office: ₴4.2 million

Diagnosis: Dissent (Ukrainian: «БожеВільні», romanized: Bozhevilni, also known as Madmen) is a 2023 Ukrainian feature film, a historical drama directed by Denys Tarasov, whose characters in the 1970s confront the Soviet system's use of punitive psychiatry to suppress dissent.

The world premiere took place at the Warsaw International Film Festival on October 13, 2023. The film received a Special Mention Award in the 1-2 COMPETITION section. It was released in Ukrainian theaters on October 31, 2024. Box office earnings amounted to ₴4.2 million.

== Plot ==
In the 1970s, Andriy Dovzhenko, a young, creative, and freedom-loving individual, discovers that many accused of "anti-Soviet activity" were sent to special psychiatric hospitals rather than prisons, diagnosed with a KGB-invented condition—"sluggish schizophrenia." Trapped in the horrors of punitive psychiatry, Andriy faces a choice: cooperate with the KGB to return to his family or expose the truth about dissidents tortured in psychiatric facilities.

Throughout the film, Andriy (played by Kostiantyn Temliak) undergoes a profound transformation, grappling with whether his rebellion against the Soviet system stems from a desire to stand out or a genuine pursuit of human free will. He represents a composite of freedom-loving individuals caught in the KGB's grip due to their rejection of the oppressive communist regime.

== Cast ==
Actor	Role
Kostiantyn Temliak	Andriy Dovzhenko
Nataliia Babenko	Oksana Dovzhenko
Serhiy Kalantai	Valentyn Stelmakh
Irma Vitovska-Vantsa	Iryna Lakhnovska
Ostap Stupka	Mykola Khudymchuk
Vitaliy Salii	Kozych
Serhiy Kysil	Vitaliy Kravets
Andriy Mostrenko	Rohoza
Dmytro Oliinyk	Hamlet
Oles Katsion	Orderly Levchenko
Pavlo Kostitsyn	Volodymyr Prus
Anastasiia Pustovit	Nurse
Yevhen Chernykov	Mykola Bantysh
Oleg Stefan	Oleg Stefan
Artem Martynyshyn	Orderly Fatman
Oleg Stalchuk	Radio Director
Viktor Zhdanov	Hamlet's Father
Roman Yakymchuk	Zhukovets
Viacheslav Bielozorov	Morozov
Oleksandr Hannochenko	Doctor
Tamara Morozova	Doctor
Oleksandr Hryhoriev	Doctor
Anton Solovei	Radio Colleague
Anastasiia Atamanchuk	Reception Nurse
Hryhorii Bokovenko	Grandfather
Anton Zakharchuk	Ghost
Oleksii Komarovskyi	Bayan

== Creative Team ==
- Director: Denys Tarasov
- Writers: Kseniia Zastavska, Oleksandr Hlasenko
- Producers: Valeriia Ivanenko, Artem Koliubaiev, Taras Bosak
- Cinematographer: Yevhenii Kyrei
- Production Designer: Ivan Tyshchenko
- Composer: Hosein Mirzagoli
- Sound Designer: Ivan Haladiuk
- Editor: Mikael Torgomian
- Costume Designer: Yana Nikitenko
- Makeup Artist: Serhiy Maurin
- Casting Director: Olena Artiomova
- Consultants: Semen Gluzman, Valeriia Ivanenko
- Co-producers: Volodymyr Bulba, Maksym Leshchanka

== Production ==
The film marked the feature directorial debut of Denys Tarasov.

"Diagnosis: Dissent is a story about the unequal struggle of one small individual against the powerful mechanism of a totalitarian state with its sprawling network of spies and agents who, like parasites, fed on its vitality and the lives of innocent citizens. Clearly, defeating such an enemy is impossible without personal sacrifice. Dissidents waged a long battle, with something greater than personal life at stake. Friends, colleagues, relatives, and family were all at risk. Only a few could risk these sacred elements of any society and stubbornly pursue their goal—freedom and democracy," says director Denys Tarasov.

The director focused heavily on recreating the 1970s era, including sets, costumes, hairstyles, actors' appearances, and music. On the first day of shooting, Tarasov wore a 1970s-style outfit—flared trousers, a shirt, a wig, and long hair—to immerse himself in the atmosphere and connect with the actors.

Composer Hosein Mirzagoli created a soundtrack in the style of 1970s Western rock, reminiscent of an unreleased Led Zeppelin album. Music plays a pivotal role in the film, serving not just as background but as a symbol of freedom, a driver, and a catalyst for events.

The film was produced with support from the State Agency of Ukraine on Cinema.

== Awards and nominations ==
Year	Festival	Category / Award	Nominee	Result
2023	Warsaw International Film Festival	Special Mention in 1-2 Competition	Diagnosis: Dissent	Won
2023	Warsaw International Film Festival	Audience Award	Diagnosis: Dissent	Won
2024	Transilvania International Film Festival	Larger than Life Section	Diagnosis: Dissent	Nominated
2024	Odesa International Film Festival	National Competition: Ukrainian Feature Films	Diagnosis: Dissent	Nominated
2024	Montreal International Film Festival	Best Director	Denys Tarasov	Won
2024	Montreal International Film Festival	Best Actor	Kostiantyn Temliak	Won
2024	OKO International Ethnographic Film Festival	OKO GLOBAL: Feature Film Competition	Diagnosis: Dissent	Nominated

== Theatrical Release ==
The nationwide theatrical premiere in Ukraine took place on October 31, 2024. Theatrical distribution and promotion were handled by FILM.UA Distribution, known for its portfolio of national and Eastern European films ranging from arthouse to blockbusters, and Kinomania.
