= Kiguli =

Kiguli is a surname. Notable people with the surname include:

- Sarah Kiguli, Ugandan pediatrician
- Susan Nalugwa Kiguli (born 1969), Ugandan poet
