= Kumi Town =

Kumi Town Kumi Municipality
- Location in Uganda
- Coordinates: 01°29′36″N 33°56′15″E
- Country: Uganda
- Region: Eastern Region of Uganda
- Sub-region: Teso sub-region
- District: Kumi District
- Elevation: 3,220 ft (980 m)

Population (2024 Census)
  - Total: 39,781

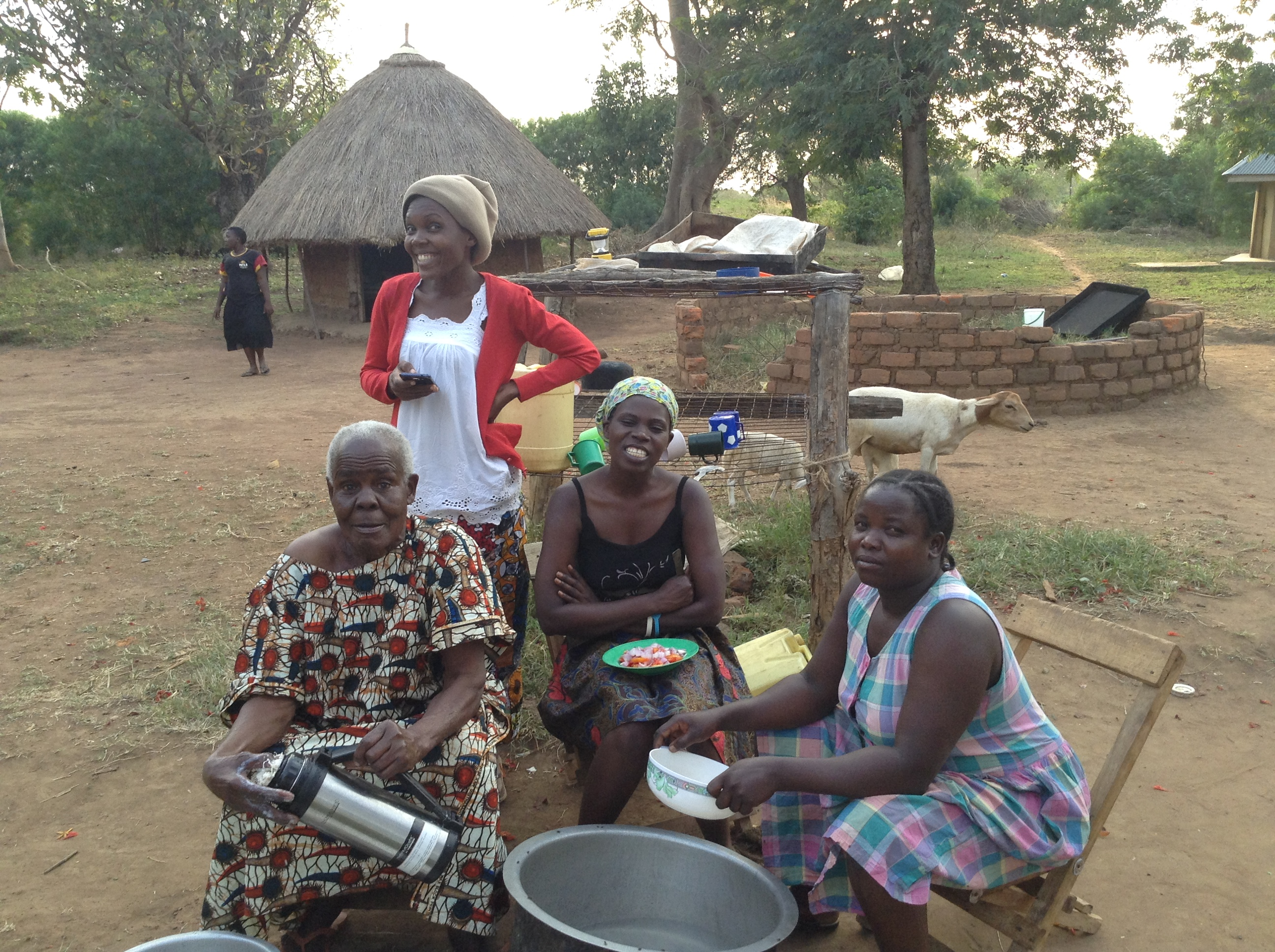
Family in Kumi

Kumi Town, commonly called Kumi, is a town in the Eastern Region of Uganda. It is the main municipal, administrative, and commercial center in Kumi District and the site of the district headquarters.

== Location ==
Kumi is approximately 65 kilometres (40 mi), by road, northwest of Mbale, on the highway between Mbale and Soroti. It is approximately 54 kilometres (34 mi), by road, southeast of Soroti, the largest town in the Teso sub-region Kumi is about 250 kilometres (160 mi), by road, northeast of Kampala, the capital of Uganda and its largest city. The coordinates of the town are 1°29'36.0"N, 33°56'15.0"E (Latitude:1.493334; Longitude:33.937500).

== Population ==
The national census in 2002 estimated the population of the town of Kumi at 8,800. In 2010, the Uganda Bureau of Statistics (UBOS) estimated the population at 12,500. In 2011, UBOS estimated the mid-year population at 13,000. In 2014, the national population census and household survey enumerated the population of Kumi Town at 36,493 people, of whom 18,690 (51.2 percent) were female and 17,803 (48.8 percent) were male.

== Points of interest ==
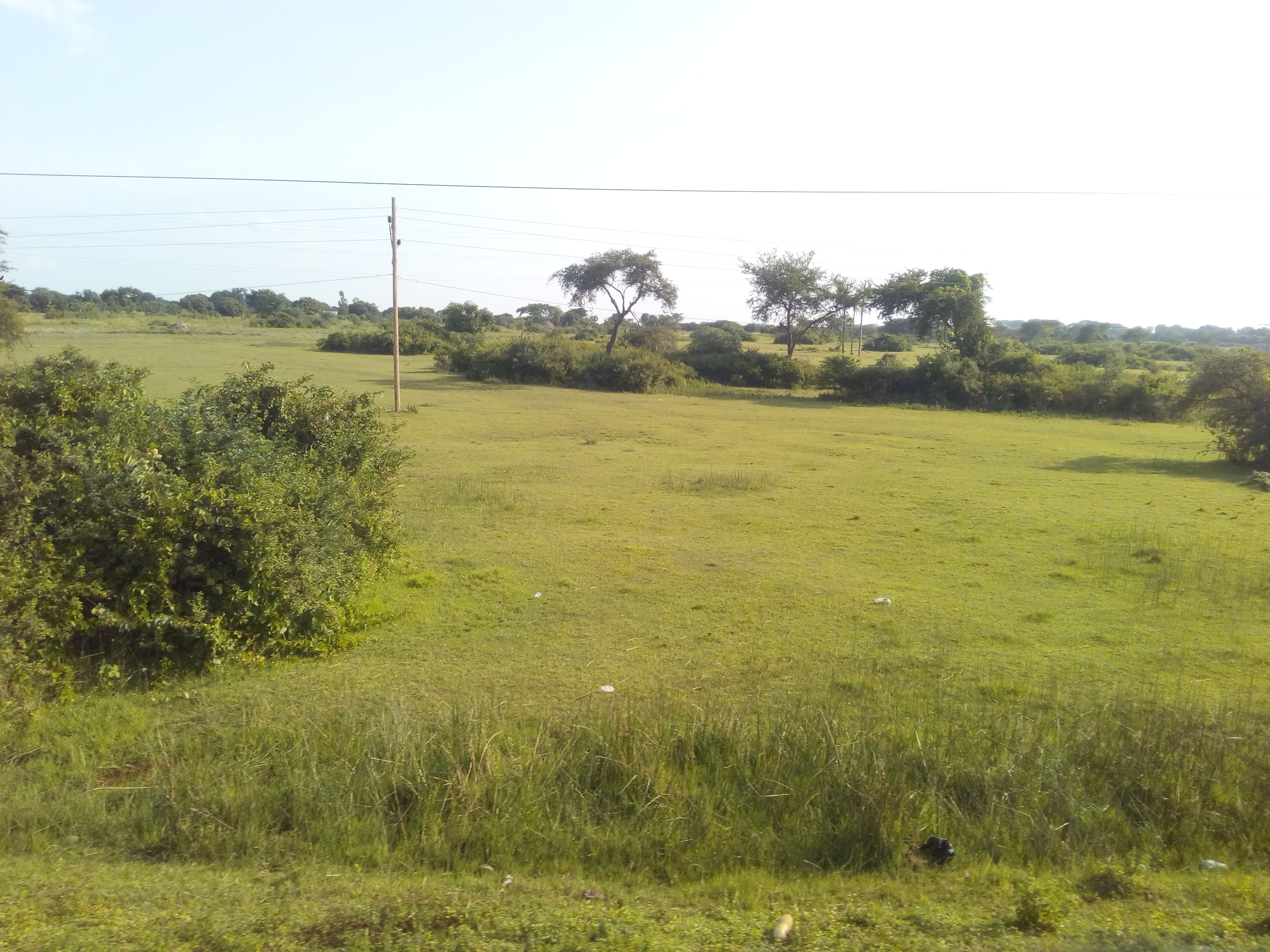
Green Vegetation at a swamp in Kumi District

The following additional points of interest lie within the town limits or close to the edges of town: (a) offices of Kumi Town Council (b) Kumi central market (c) Atutur General Hospital, a 200-bed public hospital, administered by the Uganda Ministry of Health (d) main campus of Kumi University, a private institution of tertiary education and located about 8 kilometres (5 mi) west of the town's central business district and (e) Tororo-Mbale-Soroti Road, passing through town in a southeastern to northwestern direction.

== Notable people ==
- Thomas Aisu (1954–2018), physician, microbiologist, academic and academic administrator, who at the time of his death was an associate professor at Soroti University.
- Anne Atai Omoruto (1956-2016), was a Ugandan family physician, public health specialist, and academic. In 2014, she led a team of 12 Ugandan physicians as part of the World Health Organization's response to the Ebola outbreak in Liberia.[1]

== See also ==
- List of cities and towns in Uganda
