= James Katorobo =

Professor James Katorobo is a former United Nations diplomat from Uganda and a former lecturer at Makerere University in Kampala.

Katorobo was chief technical adviser at the United Nations headquarters in New York in charge of the Management, Development, and Governance Division under the United Nations Development Programme (UNDP). He was also part of the UN mission of advisers in Rwanda immediately after the 1994 Rwandan genocide before moving to the United Nations in New York in 1997.

While in New York, Katorobo had a brief assignment overseeing needs and aid to Somalia during its civil war. He worked out of Nairobi, Kenya, owing to the violence in the Horn of Africa. He also worked with the UN in East Timor, and he frequently visited these two countries while stationed in New York.

Katorobo obtained his doctorate degree (PhD) in African Studies from the Massachusetts Institute of Technology (MIT) in 1975.

== See also ==
- Victoria Sekitoleto
- Elizabeth Lwanga
- Rachel Mayanja
