= Matshidiso Moeti =

Motswana physician, WHO Regional Director for Africa (born 1954)

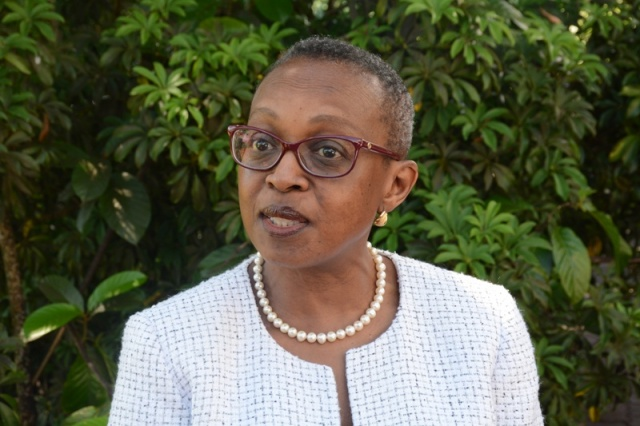
- Born: 13 March 1954 (age 72); Greater Johannesburg area, South Africa
- Education: University of London (MBBS); London School of Hygiene and Tropical Medicine (MSc)
- Occupations: Physician; Public health specialist; Medical Administrator
- Years active: 1980s–present
- Title: Regional Director; WHO Regional Office for Africa

Matshidiso Rebecca Natalie Moeti (born 13 March 1954) is a Motswana physician, public health specialist and medical administrator who served as Regional Director of the World Health Organization Regional Office for Africa (AFRO), headquartered in Brazzaville, the Republic of the Congo, from February 2015 to February 2025.

== Early life and education ==
Moeti was born in South Africa in the 1950s. In 1978, she obtained her MBBS degree from Royal Free Hospital School of Medicine of the University of London. Later, in 1986, she graduated with a Master of Science in Community Health for Developing Countries from the London School of Hygiene and Tropical Medicine.

== Career ==
In the early 1990s, Moeti worked for the Botswana Ministry of Health. She then joined UNAIDS, rising to the position of Team Leader of the Africa and Middle East Desk, based in Geneva, from 1997 until 1999. She also served as the Regional Health Advisor for UNICEF's Regional Office for East and Southern Africa.

In 1999, Moeti joined the WHO Regional Office in Africa, working on HIV/AIDS. She was appointed as Assistant Regional Director, serving in that capacity from 2008 until 2011. She also served as the Director of Noncommunicable Diseases at the regional office. From 2005 until 2007, she served as the WHO Country Representative in Malawi. At the time of her appointment to her current position, she was the Coordinator of the Inter-Country Support Team for the South and East African countries of WHO African Region.

Moeti was appointed as Regional Director of the WHO Regional Office for Africa on 27 January 2015, by the WHO Executive Board sitting at its 136th session in Geneva, Switzerland. She became the first woman to head the office. She assumed office on 1 February 2015, to serve a renewable five-year term. This followed the endorsement of the health ministers of the 47 member countries in the Africa Region, at their meeting in Cotonou, Benin, in November 2014. She replaced Luis Gomes Sambo of Angola, who served as the Director of AFRO from 2005 until 2015. She was reelected for a second term in 2019. She was succeeded in 2025 by Mohamed Yakub Janabi of Tanzania.

== Other activities ==
- Virchow Prize for Global Health, Member of the Council (since 2022)
- Centre for International Health Protection (ZIG), Robert Koch Institute (RKI), Member of the Scientific Advisory Board (since 2020)
- WomenLift Health, Member of the Global Advisory Board
- World Health Summit, Member of the Council

== Selected publications ==
- Norr, Kathleen; Tlou, Sheila; Moeti, Matshidiso (March 2004). "Impact of Peer Group Education on HIV Prevention Among Women in Botswana". Health Care for Women International. 25 (3): 210–226. doi:10.1080/07399330490272723. PMID 15195767. S2CID 26715341. Wikidata ()
- Zere, Eyob; Moeti, Matshidiso; Kirigia, Joses; Mwase, Takondwa; Kataika, Edward (15 May 2007). "Equity in health and healthcare in Malawi: analysis of trends". BMC Public Health. 7 (1): 78. doi:10.1186/1471-2458-7-78. PMC 1884146. PMID 17504530. Wikidata ()
- Moeti, Matshidiso (October 2016). "Winning the battle against the scourge of poliomyelitis in the African Region". Vaccine. 34 (43): 5142–5143. doi:10.1016/J.VACCINE.2016.05.059. PMID 27576072. Wikidata ()
- Nkengasong, John N; Maiyegun, Olawale; Moeti, Matshidiso (March 2017). "Establishing the Africa Centres for Disease Control and Prevention: responding to Africa's health threats". The Lancet Global Health. 5 (3): e246–e247. doi:10.1016/S2214-109X(17)30025-6. PMID 28108138. Wikidata ()
- Moeti, Matshidiso; Nandy, Robin; Berkley, Seth; Davis, Steve; Levine, Orin (April 2017). "No product, no program: The critical role of supply chains in closing the immunization gap". Vaccine. 35 (17): 2101–2102. doi:10.1016/J.VACCINE.2017.02.061. PMID 28364913. Wikidata ()
- Aranda, Sanchia; Berkley, Seth; Cowal, Sally; Dybul, Mark; Evans, Tim; Iversen, Katja; Moeti, Matshidiso; Osotimehin, Babatunde; Peterson, Stefan; Piot, Peter; Purandare, Chittaranjan N.; Sidibé, Michel; Trimble, Ted; Tsu, Vivien Davis (July 2017). "Ending cervical cancer: A call to action". International Journal of Gynecology & Obstetrics. 138: 4–6. doi:10.1002/IJGO.12182. PMID 28691327. Wikidata ()
- Moeti, Matshidiso (December 2017). "Longer and healthier lives for all Africans by 2030: perspectives and action of WHO AFRO". The Lancet. 390 (10114): 2747–2749. doi:10.1016/S0140-6736(17)32128-1. PMID 28917962. S2CID 833933. Wikidata ()
- Rosenthal, Philip J.; Breman, Joel G.; Djimde, Abdoulaye A.; John, Chandy C.; Kamya, Moses R.; Leke, Rose G. F.; Moeti, Matshidiso R.; Nkengasong, John; Bausch, Daniel G. (5 May 2020). "COVID-19: Shining the Light on Africa" (PDF). The American Journal of Tropical Medicine and Hygiene. 102 (6): 1145–1148. doi:10.4269/AJTMH.20-0380. PMC 7253089. PMID 32372749. Wikidata ()

== See also ==
- World Health Organization
- Ebola Hemorrhagic Fever
- Ebola virus epidemic in West Africa

Preceded by Luis Gomes Sambo; 2005–2015	WHO Regional Director for Africa; 2015–2025	Succeeded by Mohamed Yakub Janabi; 2025–
