= Thomas Aisu =

Ugandan medical doctor (1954-2018)

- Born: January 1, 1954; Kumi, Uganda
- Died: October 16, 2018 (aged 64); Soroti, Uganda
- Education: Namilyango College; Makerere University (M.B.B.S., M.Med.)
- Occupations: Pathologist, academic & academic administrator
- Years active: 1980—2018
- Known for: Academics
- Title: Former Associate Professor of Microbiology at Soroti University

Thomas Ongodia Aisu (1 January 1954 – 16 October 2018), was a Ugandan medical doctor, microbiologist, academic and academic administrator, who at the time of his death, served as an associate professor at the Soroti University School of Health Sciences.

== Background and education ==
Thomas Aisu was born in Otipe Village, Olungia Ward, in the Southern Division of Kumi Municipality. After attending local schools, he studied at Namilyango College, an all-boys boarding high school in Mukono District, where he completed his A-Level studies.

In 1974 he was admitted to Makerere University School of Medicine, graduating in 1979 with a Bachelor of Medicine and Bachelor of Surgery degree. Later, in 1988, the same medical school awarded him the Master of Medicine degree in pathology, specializing in microbiology.

== Career ==
Aisu worked in the past as a laboratory specialist medical officer at the World Health Organization. During the 1990s and early 2000s, he served as the head of the Department of Medical Microbiology at Makerere University Medical School in Uganda. He also served as the head of the National Tuberculosis Reference Laboratory.

In 2018, he served as a consultant pathologist at Mulago National Referral Hospital in Kampala, from where he was recruited to serve as an associate professor at Soroti University.

== Death ==
On the morning of Tuesday 16 October 2018, Aisu drove himself in his personal automobile to the campus of Soroti University. He had gone to attend a meeting of the University Senate, which was in preparation for a visit from the Uganda National Council for Higher Education the following week. Aisu made a presentation to the meeting which took place in the university boardroom.

After his presentation, he collapsed and died. His body was taken first to Soroti Regional Referral Hospital and then to Mulago Hospital for a postmortem. He was laid to rest at his ancestral home, in Kumi Municipality, on Saturday 20 October 2018.

== See also ==
- Robert Ikoja-Odongo
- Specioza Kazibwe
- Magid Kagimu
- Kenneth Ocen Obwot
- Churchill Lukwiya Onen
