= Kabugo =

Kabugo is a surname. Notable people with the surname include:

- Charles Kabugo, Ugandan physician
- Savio Kabugo (born 1995), Ugandan footballer
