= Luís Gomes Sambo =

Angolan physician and politician

Regional Director of the WHO Regional Office for Africa
- In office 2005 – 31 January 2015
- Preceded by: Ebrahim M. Samba
- Succeeded by: Matshidiso Moeti

National Assembly Member
- In office ?–?

Vice Minister of Health
- In office 1983–1988
- President: José Eduardo dos Santos

Personal details
- Born: c. 1950 (age 75–76)
- Education: University of Angola; University of Hull
- Occupation: Physician, politician

Luís Gomes Sambo (born c. 1950) is an Angolan medical doctor and politician who served as vice minister of health. He previously worked at the World Health Organization (WHO) in various positions before rising to the position of regional director in 2005. His term as director ended on 31 January 2015.

== Education ==
Sambo studied for a bachelor's degree in medicine at the University of Angola and a diploma in Public Health at the Portuguese Medical Association. After his medical studies, he enrolled for a PhD in Management at the University of Hull, United Kingdom.

== Career ==
Sambo entered civil service in the ministry of health. He was director of Health Services in Cabinda Province and later became the director of the International Cooperation department of the Ministry of Health. After this he was appointed vice-minister of health serving concurrently as chair of the National Health Committee and coordinator of public hospitals in Luanda. At the international level, he served as WHO's regional director for Africa, director of programme management, and director of the Division of Health Services Development. He later became country representative for Guinea Bissau and chief of the Inter-Country Strategic Support Team for Southern/East African countries.

He belongs to multiple medical organizations including the Portuguese Medical Association, International Editorial Board of the Global Library of Women's Medicine, and the International Society of Systems Sciences. He is currently a member of the Angolan parliament.

Preceded by Ebrahim M. Samba; 1995–2005	WHO Regional Director for Africa; 2005–2015	Succeeded by Matshidiso Moeti; 2015–2025
