= Kharkiv National Medical University =

Public university in Kharkiv, Ukraine

Coordinates: 50.0091°N 36.2285°E

- ДЗВО "Харківський національний медичний університет"
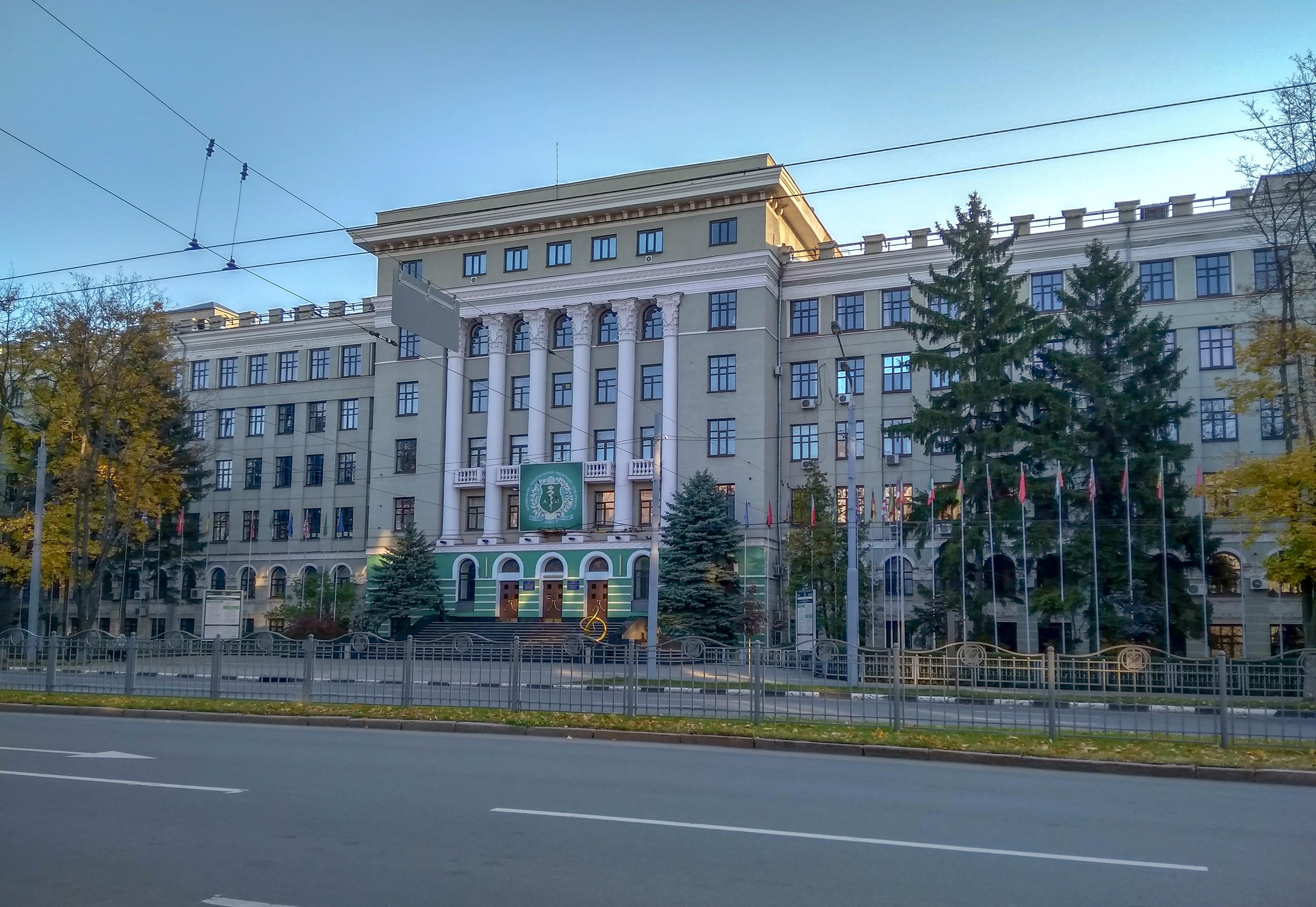
- University building
- Former names: Kharkiv Medical Institute (1921–94); Kharkiv State Medical University (1994-2007)
- Motto: Valetudo est bonum optimum
- Type: Public medical university
- Established: 1805; 221 years ago as medical faculty of the Imperial Kharkiv University
- Accreditation: Ministry of Education and Science of Ukraine
- Rector: V.A.Kapustnyk
- Students: 10000
- Location: 4 Nauky Ave, Kharkiv, 61022, Ukraine
- Campus: Urban
- Website: https://khnmu.com

Immovable Monument of Local Significance of Ukraine
- Official name: «Медичний інститут» (Medical University)
- Type: Urban Planning, Architecture
- Reference no.: 7259-Ха

The Kharkiv National Medical University (Ukrainian: Харківський національний медичний університет), formerly known as Kharkiv Medical Institute and Kharkiv State Medical University, is a State-sponsored medical university in Kharkiv, Ukraine. In March 2022 many buildings were heavily damaged due to the Russian invasion into Ukraine.

Over 700 teachers work at the departments of the university. Staff capacity is 5 corresponding members NAMN Ukraine, 17 Honoured Scientist of Ukraine, 2 Honored high school Ukraine, 13 distinguished doctors of Ukraine, 8 winners of the State Prize of Ukraine in Science and Engineering, 28 academicians of the public academies of Ukraine, 28 employees - Member of International Medical Associations;. Since 1951, the university has been training medical personnel for countries of the Eastern Europe, China and Mongolia, and since 1961 it has been training students from other countries of Asia, Africa and Latin America. At present, there are about 3400 foreign students in the Kharkiv National Medical University who study at the Preparatory Department, Medical, Nursing and Dental Faculties, undergo postgraduate and clinical post-graduate (residency) courses as well as professional probation at departments of the university in Dental, therapy, orthopedics, surgery, oncology, urology, psychiatry, ophthalmology, obstetrics and gynecology, as well as other medical specialties. The university has trained over 5000 specialists for 86 states of Europe, Asia, Latin America, Middle East countries. Among them there are 3 Doctors and 70 Candidates of Medical Science, about 200 clinical post-graduates (residents).

== History ==
The history of the higher medical school in Kharkiv is more than 200 years long and closely connected with the history of V. N. Karazin Kharkiv National University, because it sprang from its Medical Faculty. The university was founded in 1805, a decree about its foundation was signed by the Russian Tsar Alexander I, and the first Statutes of the university were approved at that time.

In the 19th century, widely known doctors and scientists taught at the medical faculty of the university and worked in practical medicine. It was them who, for the first time in the Russian Empire, performed operations of ovariotomy, total resection of the stomach, operations on the open heart, as well as made significant scientific discoveries. In 1887, a special building was erected for the anatomical theatre of the Medical Faculty (now it houses the Department of Human Anatomy of our higher school); in 1896, four independent University clinics were built, namely: therapeutic, surgical, obstetrical and ophthalmological.

In 1910, the Kharkov Medical Society, which was created on the initiative of professors of the Medical faculty, founded the Women's Medical Institute, where higher education was given to women.

In 1920 the Medical Faculty of Kharkiv University was united with the Women's Medical Institute, and Kharkiv Medical Academy was founded; one year later the latter was given another name: Kharkiv Medical Institute. Among its teachers there were a lot of outstanding pedagogues and scientists; streets of the City of Kharkiv were named after some of them. These are: physiologist Danilevsky V.Ya., surgeon Trinkler N.P., anatomist Vorobyov V.P., ophthalmologist Girschman L.L., therapeutist Frankovsky V.A.

Many research institutes, hospitals and clinics were founded on initiatives of lecturers of KhNMU. These are, in particular, the Institute of General and Emergency Surgery, Malaya Institute of Therapy, Shapoval Regional Clinical Centre of Urology and Nephrology, etc. They became the basis for scientific and medical work of our University Departments in these fields.

In 1951, the university started training of foreign students. By now, the university has trained more than 3,600 specialists for different countries of the world.

In 1994, by a Decision of the Cabinet of Ministers of Ukraine, Kharkiv Medical Institute served as the basis for founding Kharkiv State Medical University; the latter received the highest 4th category by results of its accreditation and fully justifies it today. In 2007 the university received the National status.

== Museum ==
The Museum of History of Kharkiv National Medical University was founded in 1968. It is located in the Main Building of the university and occupies 120 sq.m. The total number of the museum exhibits exceeds 5,000 pieces. In 2011, by an order of the Ministry of Education, Youth and Sports of Ukraine the Museum of History of KhNMU was awarded the title "The Perfect Museum" for its significant contribution to the cause of education of young pupils and students, increase of the national culture, preservation of the historic heritage of the Ukrainian people and of the Museum Fund of Ukraine, popularization of monuments of history, culture and nature.

The museum exhibitions display documents and articles, which make it possible to follow more than 200 years of the history of the higher medical school in Kharkiv. In particular, these are books, theses, diplomas, albums, medical instruments, photographs and other exhibits.

The museum is open for excursions accompanied by a lecturer from 9.00 a.m. until 4.00 p.m.

== Rectors and deans ==
=== Heads of the Medical Academy, Institute, University of Kharkiv from 1920 to the present ===
- Grinyov DP President (July 1920 - October 1920),
- Turkeltaub LS - Chief (October 1920 - April 1921),
- Gusakov GV - Chief (April 1921 - May 1922),
- Korshun SV; - Rector (May 1922 - October 1922),
- Kavalerov IM - rector (November 1922 - September 1923),
- Strum I. Ya. - rector (September 1923 – 1925),
- Radchenko GP - Rector (1925 - January 1927),
- Zhuk OP - rector (1927 −1929),
- Lovlya DS - director (1929 −1937),
- Tkachenko SZ - director of the 2nd med. inst. (1936 −1940),
- Gasparyan AM - director (1937 −1944),
- Shupik PL - director of the 2nd med. inst. (1940-1944),
- Truten NI - c. at. director (1944 −1945),
- Sharlay RI - director (1945 −1949),
- Kononenko IP - director (1949 −1959),
- Zadorozhny B. Ya. - rector (1959 −1975),
- Chernenko VD - Rector (1975 −1986),
- Tsiganenko A. Ya. - rector (1986 −2005),
- Lisovy VM - Rector (2005 - 2019),
- Kapustnyk VA - Rector (2019–present)

=== Deans of the Medical Faculty of Kharkiv University from 1805 to 1920 ===
- Shumlyansky PM, 1805–1806, 1808–1812;
- Coritari GG, 1807;
- Dreisig VF, 1813–1815;
- Knigin ID, 1813, 1816–1826;
- Yelinsky MI, 1827–1830;
- Blumenthal AI, 1831–1837;
- Gan FI, 1837–1857;
- Albrecht FK, 1858–1863;
- Dumonsy KO, 1864–1867;
- Shchelkov IP, 1867–1870;
- Zarubin IK, 1870–1889;
- Kovalevsky PI, 1889–1894;
- Bruev O. Ya., 1894–1897;
- Kulchytsky MK, 1897–1900;
- Popov MO, 1901;
- Lomikovsky MM, 1901–1905;
- Orlov LV, 1905–1908;
- Kuznetsov OH, 1908–1910;
- Pensky Yu. R., 1910–1920.

== Rankings and Reputation ==
The university ranks 4000 out of 11,000 universities in the world. The university takes the 26th general place and the 5th place among higher medical educational establishments of Ukraine in the scientometrical database SCOPUS. It ranks 47th among Ukrainian higher educational establishments by UNESCO "TOP 200". In 2015, the Order of Honour and Silver Diploma by the rating "Golden Fortune" were awarded to the university. KhNMU became a laureate of the rating of higher educational establishments "Ukraine-2000".

In 2001, Silver Diploma by the VII International Rating "Golden Fortune" in the nomination "The Third Millennium Quality" was awarded to the staff of the university.

In 2010, the university won an honorary title "Leader of Modern Education" at the International Exhibition "Modern Education of Ukraine"; in 2011-2012 – "Leader of National Education" at the International Exhibitions "Education and Career - 2011" and "Education and Career - 2012".

== Campuses and buildings ==
The university has a complex of modern buildings to provide the teaching process, and 6 hostels. All the students of the graduate and post-graduate stages of training are provided with hostels.

The university has 65 departments. The departments are equipped with modern classrooms and have all the opportunities for high-quality training of students.

The Departments, which provide the training for the 1st – 3rd year students, are located in 4 buildings of the university. The Departments, which provide teaching clinical subjects, are located at the Scientific-Practical Medical Centre of KhNMU, Ukrainian Research and Practical Medical Centre of Obstetrics, Gynaecology and Reproductology, Institute of Occupational Hygiene and Occupational Diseases of KhNMU, Ukrainian Institute of Clinical Genetics, University Dental Centre of KhNMU, 9 regional, 10 city and 5 departmental medical units. The Educational-Scientific Centre of the university is equipped with classrooms for phantom techniques of education.

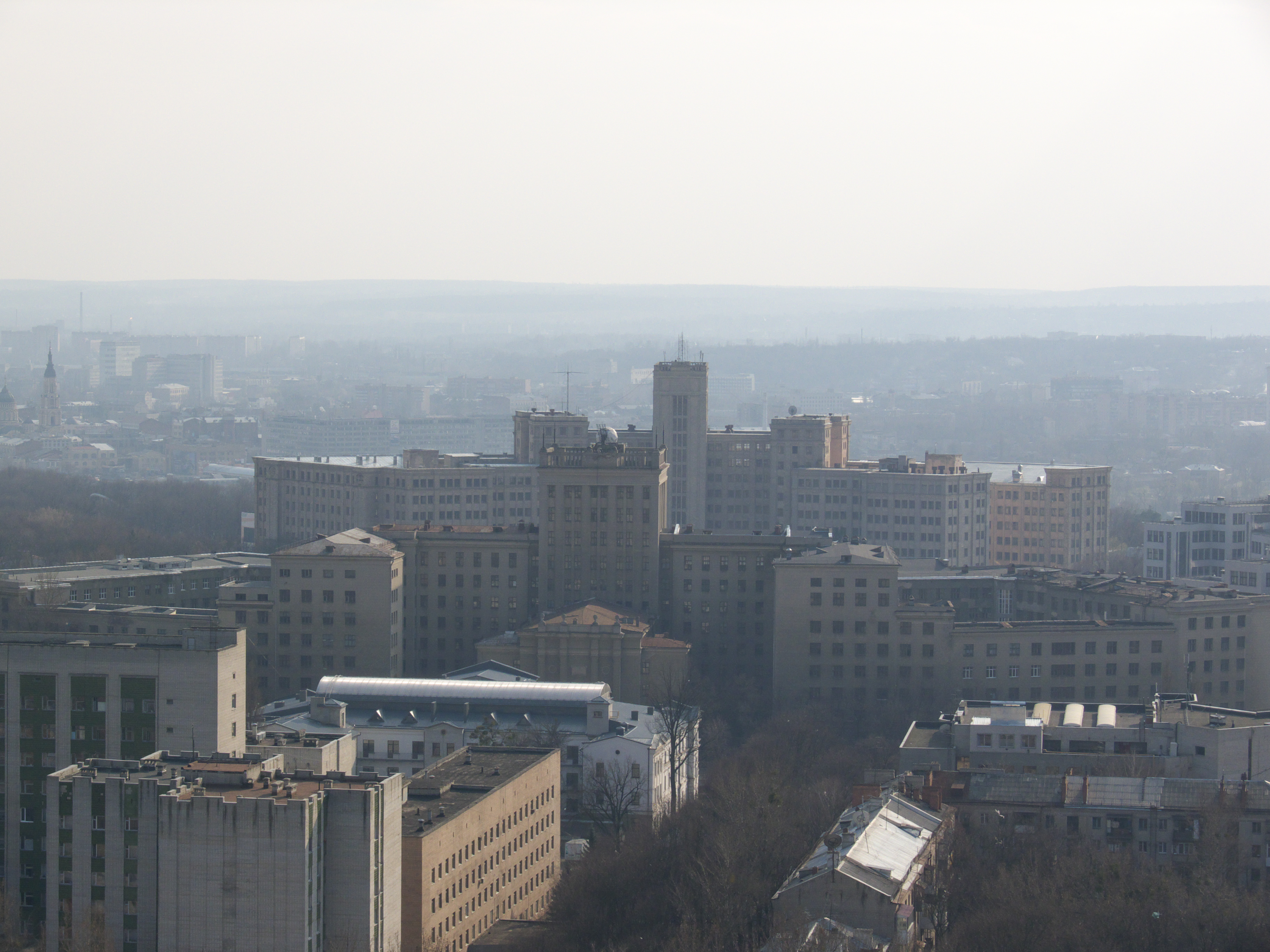

== Institutes and faculties ==
- 7 faculties;
- Educational Research Institute for Postgraduate Training at Kharkiv National Medical University;
- Medical college;
- 2 research institutes: Research Institute of Occupational Hygiene and Occupational Diseases, Ukrainian Institute of Clinical Genetics;
- Central research laboratory;
- 4 research laboratories;
- Medical training and research unit of Kharkiv National Medical University "University Dental Centre";
- Scientific-Practical Medical Centre of KhNMU.

== Research ==
About 40 researches in priority directions are conducted at the university. These are working out of methods for prevention, diagnosing and treatment of diseases of the cardiovascular, reproductive and musculoskeletal systems, as well as implementation of low-invasive interventions in cases of acute and chronic pathology. Researches are conducted in the Central Research Laboratory, 5 problem laboratories and departments, as well as on the basis of 2 scientific institutes and 6 education-research-production units ("Therapy" – Department of internal Medicine No.1 and Clinical Pharmacology and the Institute of Therapy of the Academy of Medical Sciences of Ukraine; "Surgery"– Department of Surgery No.1 and the Institute of General and Urgent Surgery of the Academy of Medical Sciences of Ukraine; "Obstetrics and Gynaecology" – Department of Obstetrics and Gynaecology No. 1 and the Institute of Problems of Cryobiology and Cryomedicine of the Academy of Medical Sciences of Ukraine; "Medical Radiology" – the Department of Radiation Diagnosis and Radiation Therapy and the Institute of Medical Radiology of the Academy of Medical Sciences of Ukraine; "Nephrology and Urology" – the Department of Urology, Nephrology and Andrology and Shapoval Regional Clinical Centre for Urology and Nephrology; "Medical Genetics" – the Department of Medical Genetics and the Ukrainian Institute of Medical Genetics).

Each year the workers of the university receive more than 80 patents of Ukraine on inventions and utility models, publish more than 1,400 articles in professional editions. The university takes the 5th place among higher medical educational establishments of Ukraine in the scientometrical database SCOPUS.

== International cooperation ==
KhNMU is a member of the International Association of Universities (under the aegis of UNESCO) since 1998; it is added to the register of medical universities of the World Health Organization (Avicenna Directories).

The foreign partners, who have concluded contracts for cooperation with our university, include: Belgorod State University, Kursk State Medical University, Novosibirsk State Medical University, Samara State Medical University (Russian Federation); Vilnius University (Republic of Lithuania), Otto von Guericke Magdeburg University (Federal Republic of Germany), memorandum of cooperation with Professional Hypnosis Training Institute (Poland), Poznan University of Medical Sciences (Poland), Institute of Physiology of the Academy of Sciences of the Czech Republic, Tajik State Medical University (Tajik Republic), Yeditepe University (Turkish Republic), and others. Twenty-eight workers of the university are members of 66 international medical associations

== Notable people ==
- Anastasia Afanasieva (born 1982), psychiatrist, poet, writer, translator
- Raisa Bogatyrova is a Ukrainian politician and former Vice Prime Minister of Ukraine and Minister of Health and former Secretary of National Security and Defense Council of Ukraine.
- Alexander E. Braunstein, one of the "fathers of vitamin B6".
- Mohamed Yakub Janabi - Regional Director WHO Regional Office for Africa
- Victor Skumin studied medicine at the university and graduated in 1973 with diploma with honours.
- Viktor Zhdanov was a Deputy Minister of Health for the Soviet Union.

== Accreditation of Kharkiv National Medical University ==
- World Health Organization (WHO)
- Medical Council Of India (MCI)
- United Nations Educational, Scientific, and Cultural Organization (UNESCO)
- European Federation of Psychologists' Associations (EFPA)
- American Medical Research Foundation
- University of Medical Science (Poland)
- General Council of Medicine of UK
- European University Associations
- International University Association
- Magna Charta Observatory of Fundamental University
- European Nuclear Education Network
- Bath Spa University (Great Britain)

== See also ==
- List of universities in Ukraine
- List of medical universities in Ukraine
