= Anastasia Afanasieva =

Ukrainians physician

Anastasia Valerievna Afanasieva Анастасія Валеріївна Афанасьєва
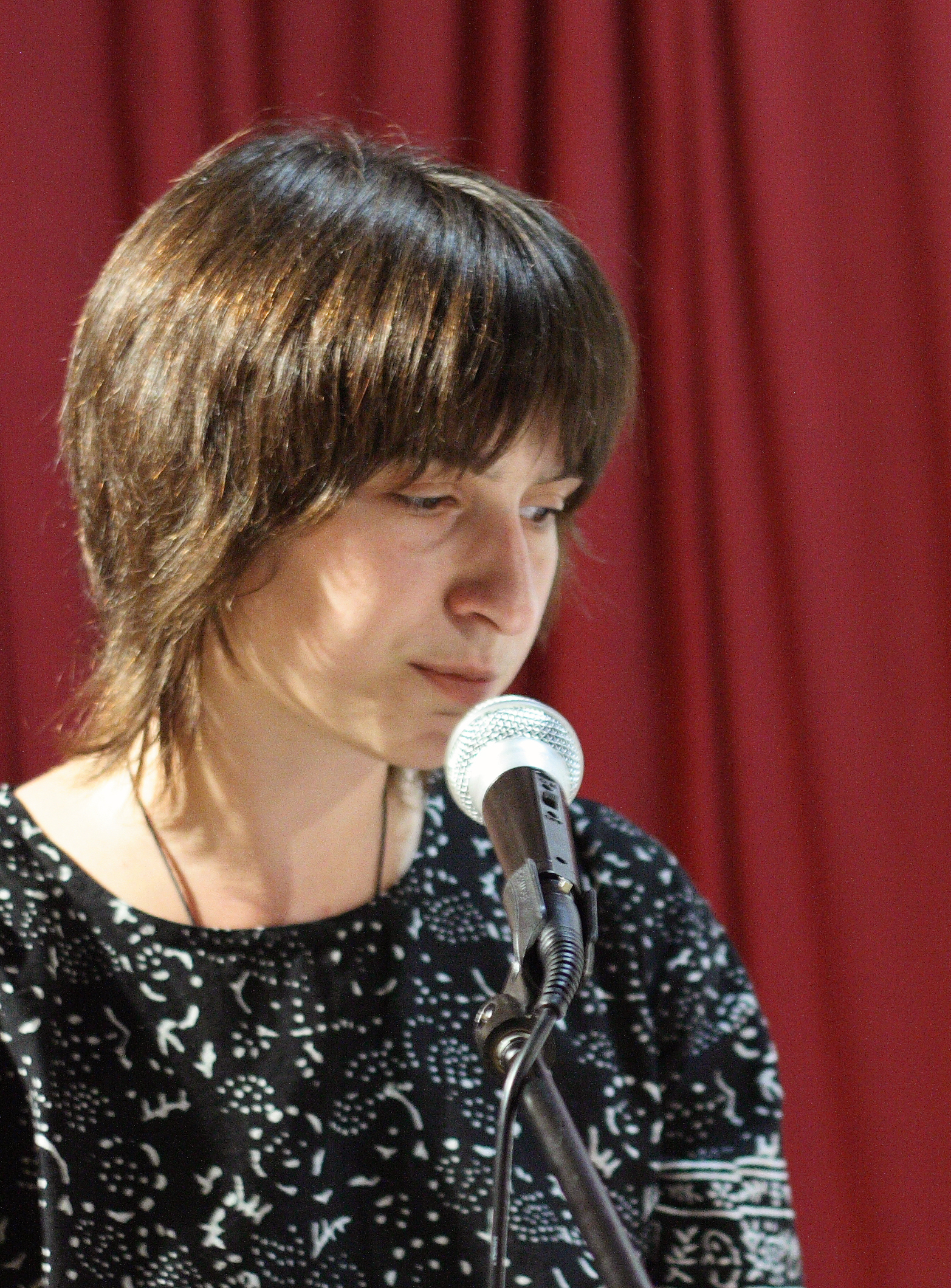
- Born: 1982 (age 43–44); Kharkiv
- Education: Kharkiv National Medical University
- Occupations: physician; poet; writer; translator

Anastasia Valerievna Afanasieva (Ukrainian: Анастасія Валеріївна Афанасьєва; born 1982) is a Ukrainian physician as well as a Russian-speaking poet, writer, and translator.

== Biography ==
Anastasia Valerievna Afanasieva was born in 1982, in Kharkiv. She graduated from Kharkiv National Medical University, and works as a physician (Note: According to jacketmagazine.com, Afanasieva is a medical psychologist.) at a psychiatric ward.

Afanasieva's poems, prose, and articles on modern poetry have been published in magazines, and other publications, including the anthologies, Babylon and Union of Writers. She is the author of the poetry collections, Poor White People (2005), Voices Speak (2007), White Walls (2010), White Soldier, Black Soldier (2010), Empty Bullet (2012), and Imprints (2014). Audio collections of her works include, White there, white here (3 CDs, 2011).

Afanasieva is the winner of the Retz Magazine Prize (2005), the Russian Prize (2006), the LiteratRRentgen Prize (2007) and others. She was shortlisted for the Debut Award (2003). Her poems have been translated into Belarusian, English, German, Italian, and Ukrainian.

== Awards ==
- Short-listed, Debut Prize in Poetry (2003)
- Short-listed, Debut Prize in Criticism (2004)
- Winner, Russian Prize in poetry (2006)

== Publications ==
=== Poetry collections ===
- Poor White People (Moscow, 2005)
- Voices Speak (Moscow, 2007)
- White Walls (2010)
- White Soldier, Black Soldier (2010)
- Empty Bullet (2012)
- Imprints (2014)
