= Chandy C. John =

Ryan White professor of pediatrics

- Born: Michigan
- Education: University of Michigan
- Scientific career
- Workplaces: Case Western Reserve University; Indiana University; Makerere University

Chandy C. John is an American physician who is the Ryan White Professor of Pediatrics at Indiana University. He works in collaboration with Makerere University on neurodevelopment conditions, malaria and sickle cell anemia. He was elected a Fellow of the National Academy of Medicine in 2025.

== Early life and education ==
John was born in Michigan. As a child, he travelled to India so his parents could work as clinicians at a mission hospital. He has said that his parents emphasized that his family “needed to use [their] privilege to help those who were less fortunate”. He was an undergraduate at the University of Michigan and remained there for his medical degree and residency. As a resident, he spent time in Nigeria and Bangladesh with children impacted by malaria. He realized that malaria had devastating impacts on children, but that very few people were investigating how to prevent it. He moved to Case Western Reserve University for a research fellowship, where he eventually earned a master's degree in pediatric infectious diseases.

== Research and career ==
John joined Indiana University in 2015. He is an expert in epidemiology and the neurodevelopment impacts of malaria. John works in Kenya and Uganda. John has studied the long term neurodevelopmental impacts of cerebral and severe malaria in children. He has shown that children who suffer from severe malaria have low cognitive scores, and that severe anemia can compromise the economic productivity of a household. He has explored the pathogenesis of malaria, including intestinal injury, kidney injury and coma. John works with local physicians and researchers in Uganda and Kenya, securing training grants to upskill specialists and build local capacity. John revealed a high mortality rate for children in the year after a hospital discharge, and successfully proposed chemoprevention (using medications to prevent the development of disease) as a preventative strategy.

John has studied infection rates in children with Sickle Cell Anemia. In some of the regions John worked in, a quarter of the children suffering from malaria also had a sickle cell trait. He led a study known as NOHARM MTD (Novel use Of Hydroxyurea in an African Region with Malaria – Maximum Tolerated Dose), which showed that hydroxyura can be used to treat malaria and reduce sickle cell infections. NOHARM changed medical guidelines in Uganda, and encouraged efforts to reduce the costs. He contributed to the creation of Global Health Uganda, a research institute in Uganda that provides support and funding to Ugandan researchers.

== Awards and honors ==
- 2011 American Society of Tropical Medicine and Hygiene Bailey Ashford Medal
- 2025 Elected Fellow of the National Academy of Medicine

== Selected publications ==
- Richard Idro; Kevin Marsh; Chandy C John; Charles R. Newton (October 2010). "Cerebral malaria: mechanisms of brain injury and strategies for improved neurocognitive outcome". Pediatric Research. 68 (4): 267-74, 267-274. doi:10.1203/pdr.0b013e3181eee738. ISSN 0031-3998. PMC 3056312. PMID 20606600. Wikidata Q21032453.
- Chandy C John; Paul Bangirana; Justus Byarugaba; Robert O Opoka; Richard Idro; Anne M Jurek; Baolin Wu; Michael J Boivin (9 June 2008). "Cerebral malaria in children is associated with long-term cognitive impairment". Pediatrics. 122 (1): e92-9. doi:10.1542/peds.2007-3709. ISSN 0031-4005. PMC 2607241. PMID 18541616. Wikidata Q37023944.
- Michael J Boivin; Paul Bangirana; Justus Byarugaba; Robert O Opoka; Richard Idro; Anne M Jurek; Chandy C John (15 January 2007). "Cognitive impairment after cerebral malaria in children: a prospective study". Pediatrics. 119 (2): e360-6. doi:10.1542/peds.2006-2027. ISSN 0031-4005. PMC 2743741. PMID 17224457. Wikidata Q37346269.

== Personal life ==
John is a published poet and writer. He has said, that while he is a scientist “at the core,”, he is a “lover and believer of and supporter of the arts because that's one of the things we live for as humans”. His partner is a pianist.
