= Kumi University =

University in Kumi Town, Uganda

- Motto: Godliness and Excellence for Servant-hood
- Type: Private
- Established: 2004
- Vice-Chancellor: Prof. Jong In Hong Since October 2024, Dr. Hong Sekee Since 2019-2024
- Administrative staff: 250+ (2024)
- Students: 2,500+ (2024)
- Location: Nyero, Kumi,, Uganda; 01°28′21″N 33°51′45″E
- Campus: 2
- Website: Homepage
- Location within Uganda

Kumi University, commonly abbreviated as (KUMU), is a private University in the Eastern region of Uganda.

== Location ==
The main university campus is in "Nyero Parish", Nyero subcounty, Kumi District, in the Eastern Region of Uganda, approximately 11 kilometres (7 mi), by road, west of the town of Kumi. This is about 250 kilometres (155 mi) north-east of Kampala, Uganda's capital and largest city. The coordinates of Kumi University Main Campus are 1°28'21.0"N, 33°51'45.0"E (Latitude:1.472500; Longitude:33.862500). In 2007, the university established a second campus in the city of Soroti, 48 kilometres (30 mi) north-west of the main campus.

== History ==
The institution was founded in 1996 by a South Korean missionary couple, Hyeong Lyeol Lyu and Min Ja Lee, under the name African Leaders Training Institute. In 1999, the name was changed to Kumi University. The university was fully accredited by the Ministry of Education and Sports in 2004. Arrangements are underway to attain a university charter. According to a 2012 published report, efforts were underway to start a medical school at this university.

== Overview ==
Enrollment at the university remains below capacity, leading to inadequate finances. In 2015, some of the staff, particularly the part-time lecturers went unpaid, leading to a lecturers' strike.

== Academics ==
As of February 2018, the university had the following functioning faculties:

- Faculty of Education and Languages
- Faculty of Science and Technology
- Faculty of Social Sciences and Management Studies
- Faculty of Theology
- School of Postgraduated Studies

== Academic Programs/Courses ==
Courses offered lead to the award of certificates, diplomas, and bachelor's degrees. The following degree courses were offered at Kumi University as of February 2018:

=== School of Postgraduate Studies ===
- Post Graduate Diploma in Financial Management (PGDFM)
- Post Graduate Diploma in Public Administration and Management (PGDPAM)
- Post Graduate Diploma in Information Technology (PGDIT)
- Post Graduate Diploma in Monitoring and Evaluation (PGDME)
- Post Graduate Diploma in Education Management and Administration (PGDEMA)

=== Faculty of Education and Languages ===
- Bachelor of Science with Education
- Bachelor of Arts with Education
- Bachelor of Education (In service)
- Bachelor Arts in Primary Education
- diploma in secondary education
- Diploma in Primary Education
- Bachelor of Education with ICT
- Higher Education Access Certificate (General Track, Biological Track and Physical Track) Done by individuals who did not perform well in 'A' Level in order to join the Diploma or Bachelor Program in any University in Uganda

=== Faculty of Science and Technology ===
- Bachelor of Science in Information Technology
- Diploma in Information Technology
- Certificate in Information Technology
- Bachelor of Computer Science
- Diploma in Computer Science
- Bachelor of Agricultural Science
- Diploma in Agricultural Science
- Certificate in Agriculture

=== Faculty of Social Sciences and Management Studies ===
- Bachelor of Business Administration
- Bachelor of Human Resource Management
- Bachelor of Administrative & Secretarial Studies
- Bachelor of Commerce
- Bachelors in Social Work and Social Administration
- Bachelors in Development Studies
- Bachelors in Guidance and Counseling
- Bachelors in Community Development
- Bachelor of Public Administration
- Diploma in Records and Archives Management
- Certificate in Records and Archives Management

=== HEAC – Higher Education Access Certificate ===
In addition to the degree courses, the university offers HEAC – Higher Education Access Certificate, a one-year full-time bridging programme designed to take care of:-

1. ‘A’ Level leaver who could have attained only one principal pass and yet wish to join University for a Diploma or Bachelor Degree.

2. ‘A’ Level leaver who attained only two subsidiaries and yet he/she desires to join the University for a Diploma programme and;

3. International Applicants whose Education system is less by one year.

== See also ==
- List of universities in Uganda
- List of medical schools in Uganda
- Education in Uganda
