= Florence Ndagire =

Ugandan lawyer

- Born: 1984 (age 41–42); Uganda
- Education: Makerere University (Bachelor of Laws); Law Development Centre (Diploma in Legal Practice); University of Leeds (Master of Laws)
- Occupation: Lawyer
- Years active: 2007 – present
- Title: Intern, UN Special Rapporteur on Disability Rights

Florence Ndagire is a female Ugandan lawyer, who works as a legal researcher and human rights lawyer at the United Nations (UN) based in Geneva, Switzerland. Ndagire, who is totally blind, also serves as the chairperson of the UN Women Regional Group, for Eastern and Southern Africa, comprising twelve countries. She is the first visually impaired person, male or female to qualify and receive licensure as a lawyer in Uganda.

== Background and education ==
She was born in Nkokonjeru, Buikwe District in 1984, to Joyce Nabinaka and Francis Kayizi. She was born prematurely at about six months gestation and kept in an incubator at the hospital. When her parents took her home from the hospital, they realized that their new-born was blind. She attended Bishop Wills Primary School in Iganga District. After secondary school, she was admitted to Makerere University in Kampala, to study law. While at Makerere, she was elected to the Guild Representative Council (GRC) to represent students in the Faculty of Law. After obtaining her Bachelor of Laws, from Makerere, she obtained a Diploma in Legal Practice from the Law Development Centre (LDC), also in Kampala. Later she received a Master of Laws from the University of Leeds in the United Kingdom. In an interview in 2012, Ndagire credits the late Francis Ayume (1940 to 2004), with inspiring her to study law. She used to listen to Ayume on radio and television, when she was growing up, and Ayume was still alive.

== Career ==
Following graduation from the Law Development Centre, and her admission to the Uganda Bar in 2009, she first worked as a Legal Assistant at the law firm Mukisa & Mukisa Company Advocates, working there from July 2009 until July 2010. She was then hired by the Uganda Society for Disabled Children, a non-profit organisation, working there as a Policy Lobbying and Advocacy Officer from October 2009 until October 2011. Then from March 2012 until July 2013, she was employed as a Fundraising & Advocacy Officer at the Uganda National Association of the Blind.

In August 2013 until December 2014 she worked as a Human Rights and Fundraising Officer for the non-profit organisation Light of the World, based in the Netherlands, with offices in Uganda. She then worked for ADD International, a non-profit based in the United Kingdom. She worked at their Kampala office, as a senior program officer from February 2015 until October 2016.

Beginning in October 2016, she is employed by the United Nations (UN), as the UN Special Rapporteur on Disability Rights, based in Geneva, Switzerland. Her reports are reviewed by the Human Rights Council.

From 1 April 2018 she joined the World Blind Union as organization's Human Rights Policy Adviser.

== See also ==
- Anna Ebaju Adeke
- Rachel Mayanja
- UN Special Rapporteur
- First women lawyers around the world
