= Stephen Kusasira =

Ugandan physician and military general

Brigadier General Stephen Kusasira
- Born: 1 January 1969 (age 57); Uganda
- Citizenship: Uganda
- Education: Makerere University (Bachelor of Medicine and Bachelor of Surgery) (Master of Medicine in Obstetrics and Gynecology) (Masters Security Strategy) Cranfield University (Masters Security Sector Management) Uganda Management Institute (Post Graduate Diploma in Project Planning and Management)
- Occupations: Military Officer, Obstetrician and Gynecologist
- Years active: 1996 – present
- Known for: Military Matters
- Title: Director of Medical Services in the Uganda People's Defence Forces

Brigadier Stephen Kusasira, is a Ugandan obstetrician, gynecologist, military officer and medical administrator in the Uganda People's Defence Forces (UPDF). He serves as the Director of Medical Services in the UPDF.

== Background and education ==
Kusasira was born in the Western Region of Uganda circa 1969. After attending Mbarara High School (1983-1986) and Ntare School (1987-1988), he was admitted to Makerere University, Uganda's oldest and largest public university, in 1989. He attended Makerere University School of Medicine, graduating in 1995, with a Bachelor of Medicine and Bachelor of Surgery degree. In 2004, he obtained a Master of Medicine in Obstetrics and Gynecology, also from Makerere University. He is a Fellow of College of Obstetrics and Gynaecology (FCOG) of East, Central and Southern Africa. He graduated from Uganda Management Institute 2005 with a Post Graduate Diploma in Project Planning and Management. He is a graduate of Galilee Management Institute, Israel in Health Systems Management and HIV/AIDS Management. He holds a Master of Science in Security Sector Management from Cranfield University, in the United Kingdom (2021) and a Masters in Security Strategy from Makerere University (2024)He is also a graduate of the Uganda Senior Command and Staff College and National Defence College- Uganda He is a graduate of the Medical Strategic Leadership Program at the US Army Medical Center of Excellence, Fort Sam Houston, Texas (2021).

== Career ==
Kusasira is based at the Bombo Military Hospital, in Bombo, Luweero District. Kusasira led the UPDF efforts to staff public hospitals, when the doctors belonging to the Uganda Medical Association (UMA) went on strike in November 2017.

In February 2019, as part of a promotions exercise that involved 2,031 UPDF men and women, Kusasira was promoted from the rank of colonel to that of brigadier general.

== See also ==
- Kenneth Ocen Obwot
- Flavia Byekwaso
