= Sviatohorivka =

Rural settlement in Donetsk Oblast, Ukraine

Sviatohorivka Святогорівка
- Rural settlement
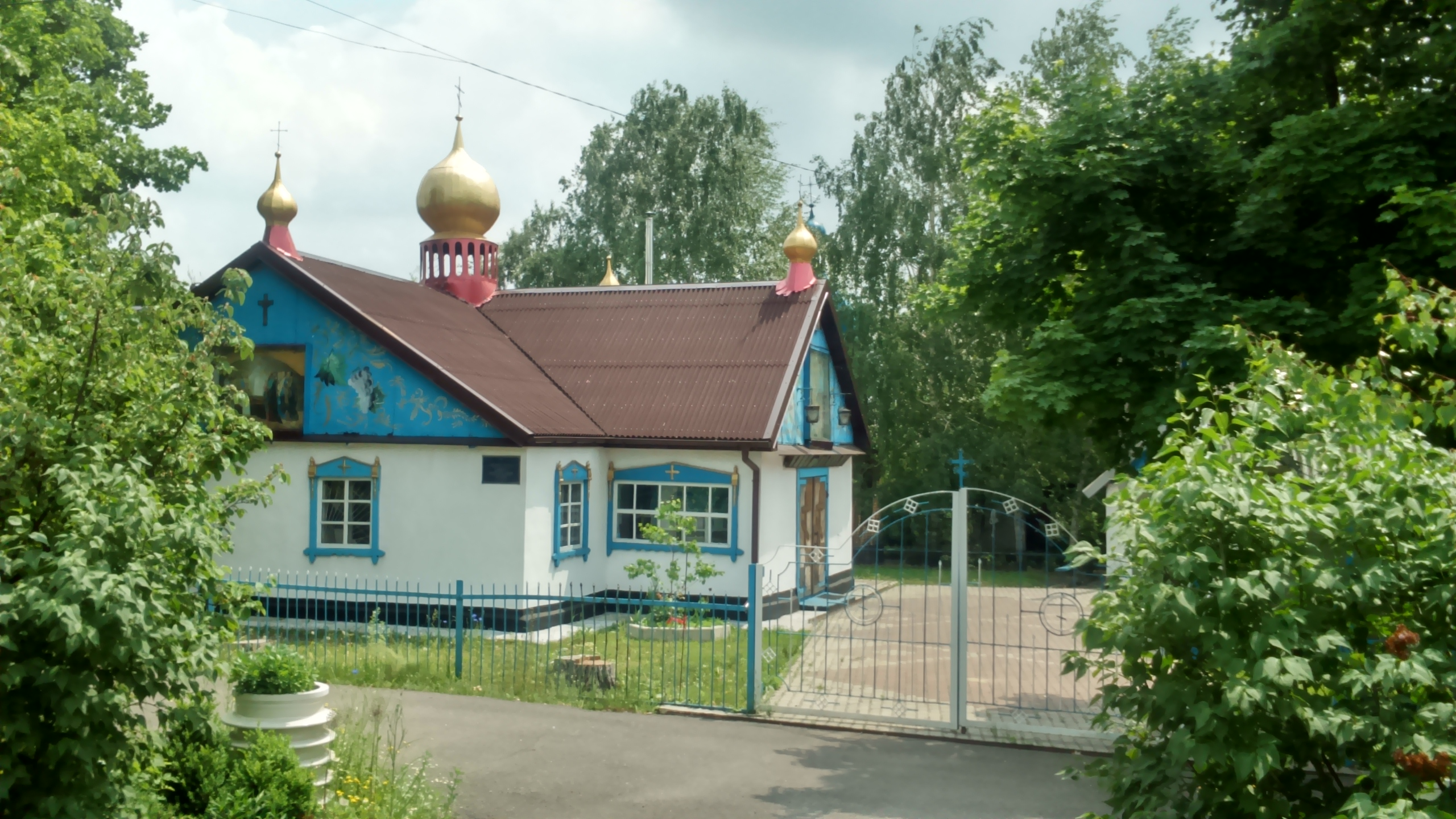

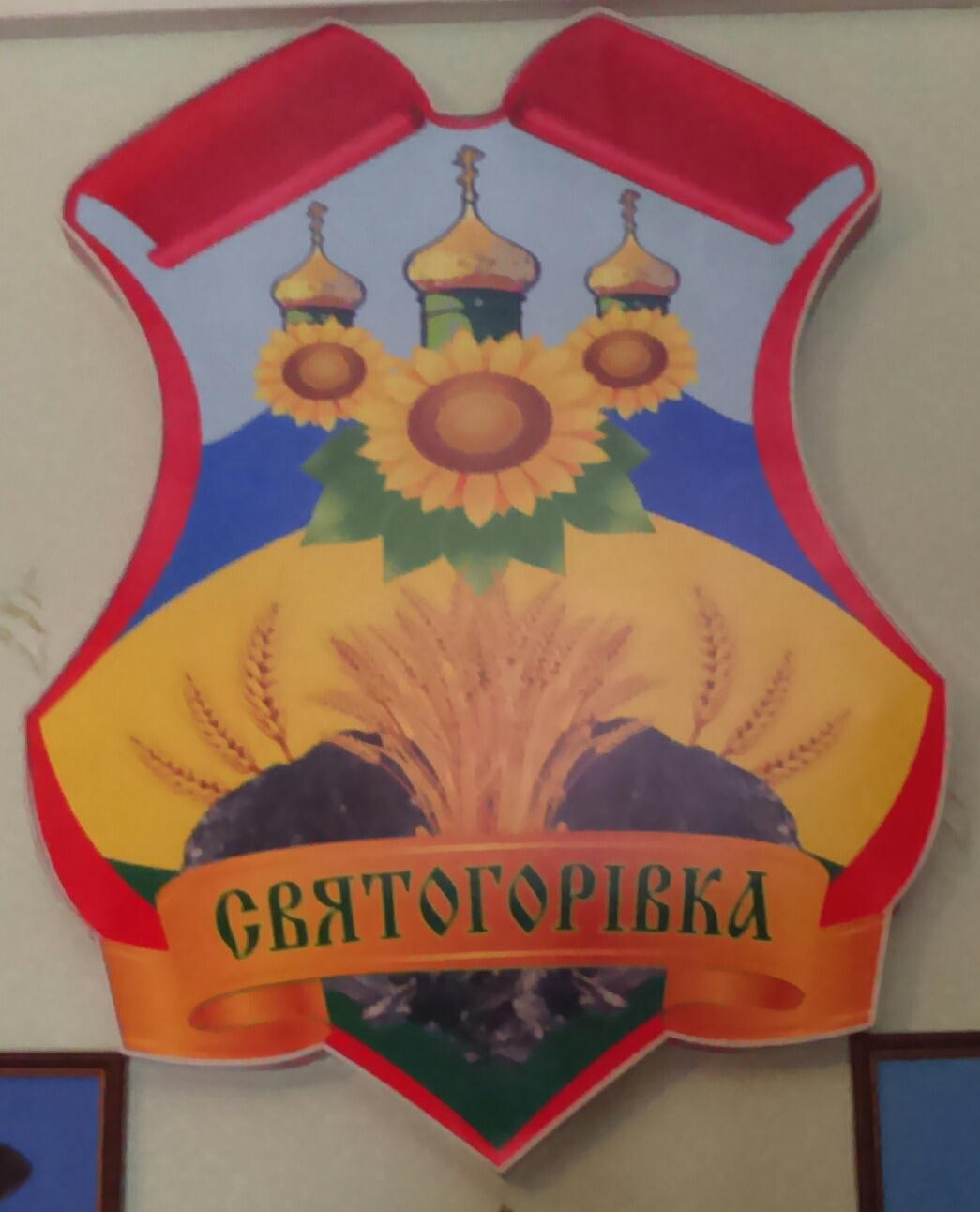
- Coat of arms

- Location of Sviatohorivka Sviatohorivka (Ukraine)
- Coordinates: 48°28′51″N 37°01′48″E
- Country: Ukraine
- Oblast: Donetsk Oblast
- Raion: Pokrovsk Raion
- Elevation: 129 m (423 ft)

Population (2022)
  - Total: 1,799
  - Estimate (02.10.2025): 163
- Time zone: UTC+2
  - Summer (DST): UTC+3
- Postal code: 85020-85021
- Area code: +380 6277

Sviatohorivka (Ukrainian: Святогорівка) is a rural settlement in Pokrovsk Raion, Donetsk Oblast, eastern Ukraine. Population: 1,799 (2022 estimate).

== Demographics ==
Distribution of the population by native language according to the 2001 Ukrainian census:

Native languages in Svyatohorivka
	percent
Ukrainian	89.52%
Russian	10.34%
Others	0.14%

== Notable people ==
- Viktor Zhdanov (1914 - 1987)
