= Kawempe General Hospital =

Kawempe Specialised National Referral Hospital
- Uganda Ministry of Health and Kampala Capital City Authority
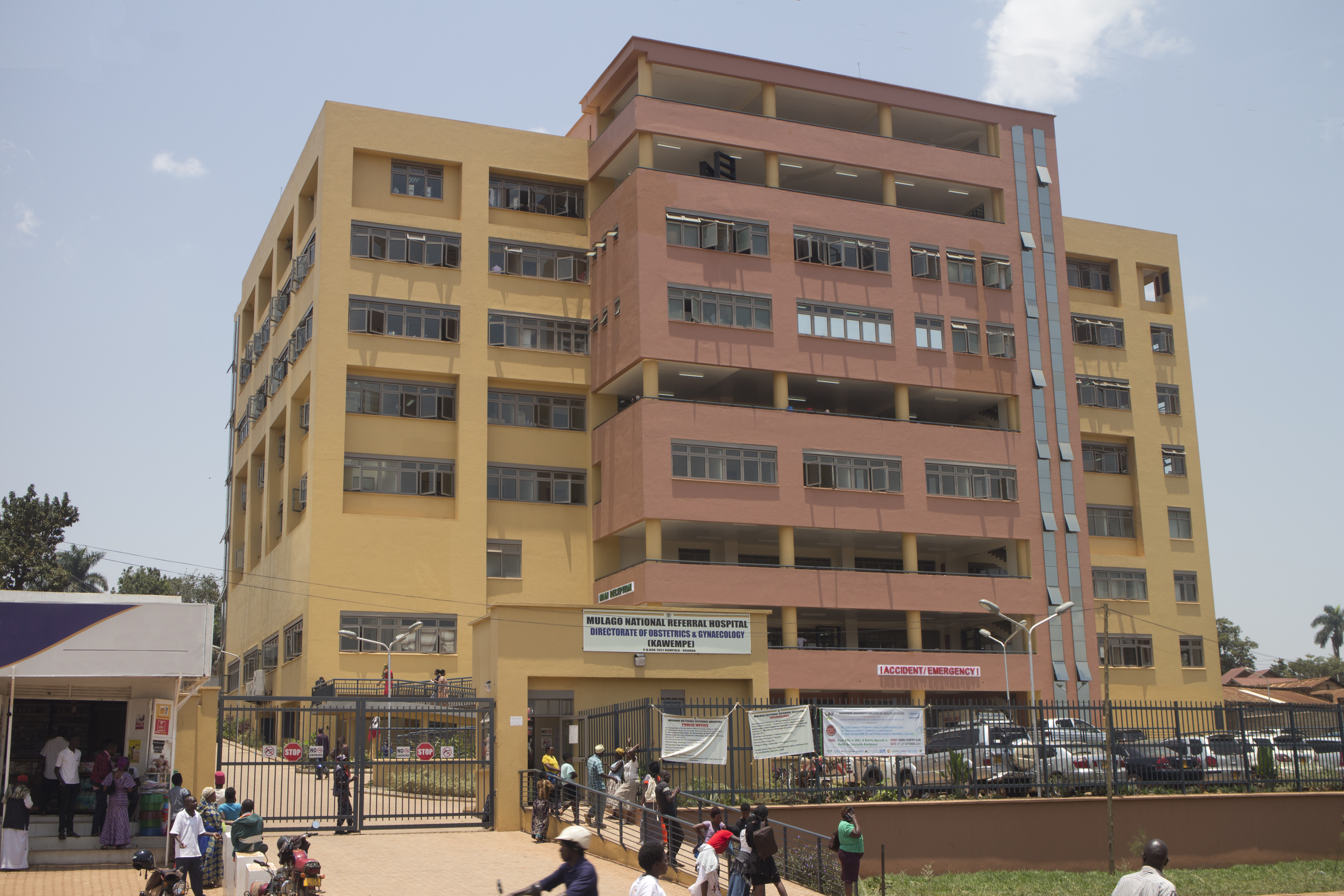

- Location within Kampala

Geography
- Location: Kawempe, Kampala, Central Region, Uganda
- Coordinates: 00°21′43″N 32°33′41″E

Organisation
- Care system: Public
- Type: General

Services
- Emergency department: III
- Beds: 200

History
- Founded: 2016

Links
- Other links: Hospitals in Uganda; Medical education in Uganda

Kawempe General Hospital, also known as Kawempe Specialised National Referral Hospital, is a hospital in Uganda. It is an urban, specialised hospital built between 2014 and 2016 at an estimated cost of US$11.3 million (about UGX:40.6 billion). The hospital was constructed by the government of Uganda, with funding from the African Development Bank and the Nigeria Trust Fund.

== Location ==
The hospital is in Kawempe Division, one of the five administrative units of the Kampala Capital City Authority. This location is approximately 5 kilometres (3 mi), by road, north of Mulago National Referral Hospital, Along the Kampala–Gulu Highway. This location is approximately 8 kilometres (5 mi), north of the central business district of the city. The coordinates of the hospital are 0°21'43.0"N, 32°33'41.0"E (Latitude:0.361944; Longitude:32.561389).

== Overview ==
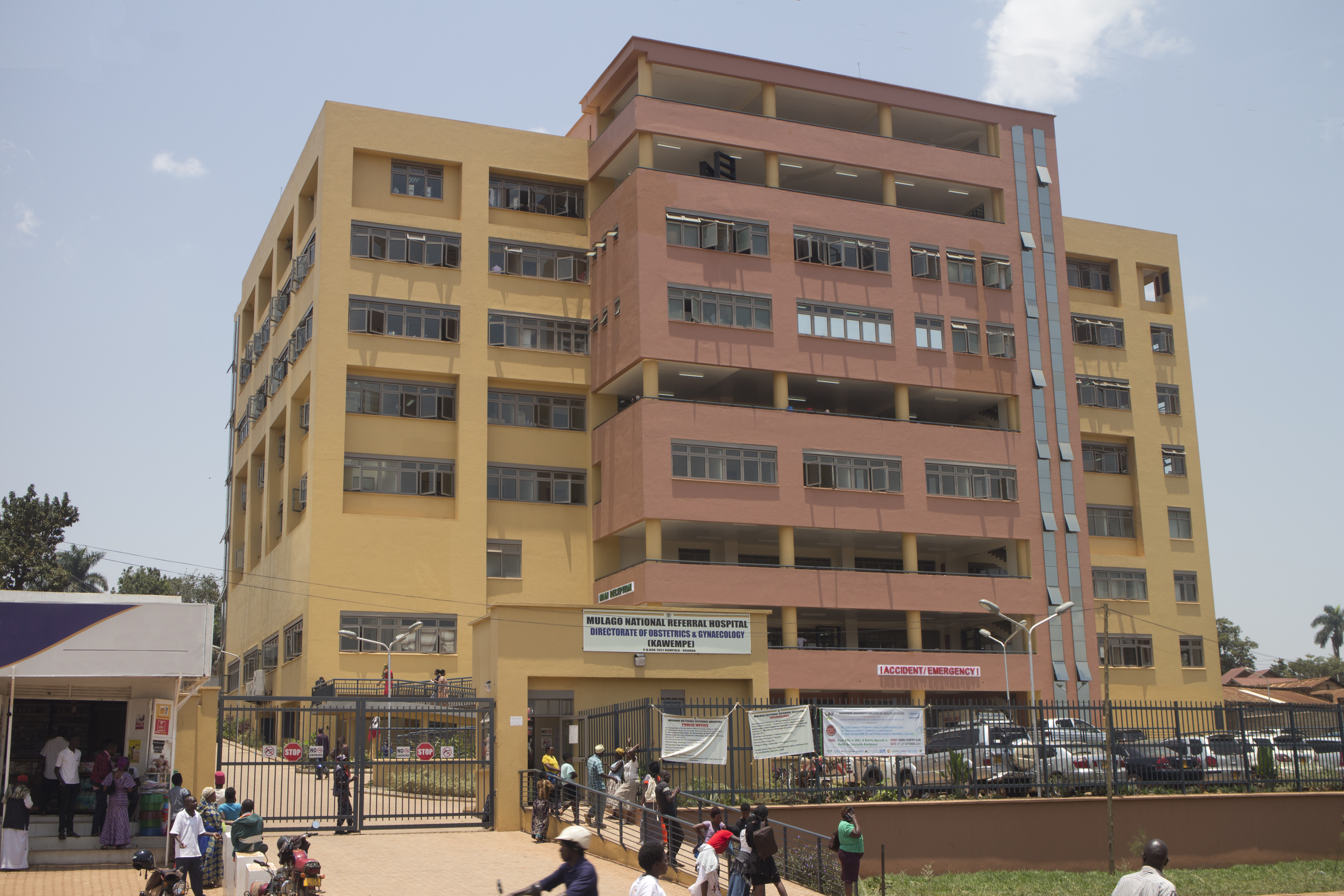
Kawempe General Hospital in Kampala, Uganda shortly after its opening in 2016

In December 2013, the Uganda government, through the Ministry of Health, contracted China National Aero Technology to construct the hospital at an estimated cost of US$15 million (UGX:38 billion). Construction was expected to commence in 2014. In December 2015, Ugandan print media reported that construction of the hospital was nearing completion, with commissioning planned for March 2016.

== Target population ==
Because of rapid urbanization, the night-time population of Kampala, Uganda's capital and largest city, is estimated at 2 million, but swells to 4.5 million during the day. The increases in the city's population has exerted extreme pressure on the Mulago National Referral Hospital, the largest public hospital in the country, which also serves as the teaching hospital for the Makerere University College of Health Sciences.

In 2013, the Uganda government obtained a loan from the African Development Bank and the Nigeria Trust Fund to rehabilitate and improve Mulago Hospital, construct Kawempe General Referral Hospital, construct Kiruddu General Hospital, and re-organize healthcare delivery in the city of Kampala, so that some of the patient burden is shifted to the Naguru General Hospital, Kawempe General Hospital, and Kiruddu General Hospital. Mulago will then be reserved for the role for which it was constructed; as a true referral hospital, serving patients referred to it by other health facilities, and not handling common colds and uncomplicated ear infections.

In June 2022, the Uganda Ministry of Health appointed Dr. Byaruhanga Emmanuel Kayogoza as the new Executive Director for Kawempe National Referral Hospital. Dr. Byaruhanga K. Emmanuel is a Senior Consultant in Obstetrician/Gynaecologist- MBChB, MMED(Obs/Gyn), DIP(SRH)-LUND, FCOG (ECSA) 2018, who replaced Dr. Nehemiah Katusiime who has been serving since his appointment as the executive director of the hospital in August 2018. Dr. Byaruhanga K. Emmanuel is deputized by Dr. Lawrence Kazibwe. Both are consultant obstetricians and gynecologists.

== See also ==
- List of hospitals in Uganda
- Naguru General Hospital
