= Joseph Mugisha =

Joseph Y.T Mugisha
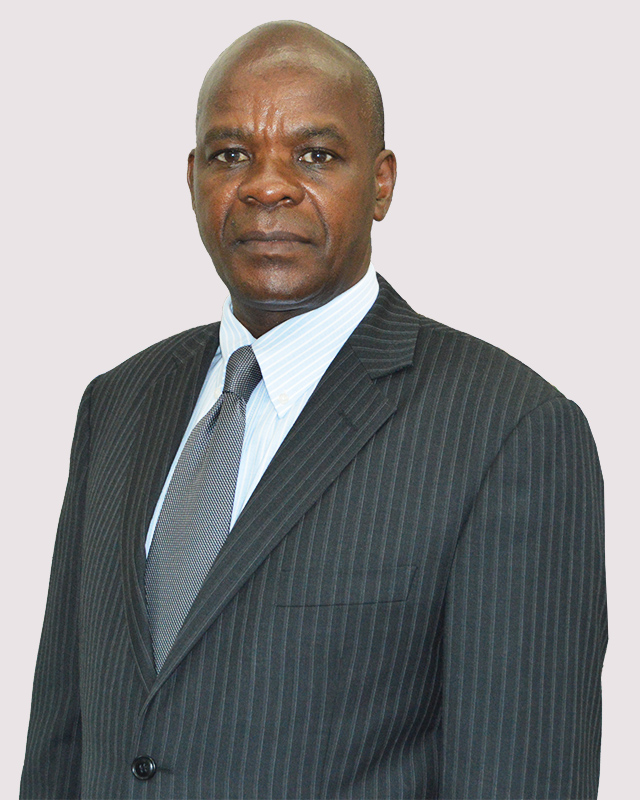
- Mugisha in 2018
- Born: 1960 (age 65–66); Bushenyi District, Sheema, Uganda
- Citizenship: Ugandan
- Education: Makerere University (Bachelor of Science),(Master of Science), (Doctor of Philosophy) Makerere University
- Occupations: Mathematician & Academic Administrator
- Years active: 1987 - present
- Known for: Academic leadership & Professor of Biomathematics
- Title: Principal, College of Natural Sciences, Makerere University

Joseph Y.T. Mugisha is a Ugandan mathematician (specialising in biomathematics), academician and academic administrator. Currently he is a professor of mathematics and principal of the College of Natural Sciences, a constituent college of Makerere University. Makerere University is the oldest university in Uganda.

== Background and education ==
He was born in 1960 in Bushenyi district, Western Uganda. Professor Mugisha received his PhD in Bio-mathematics in 2000 from Makerere university. Prior to that he was awarded a Masters of Science(Bio-mathematics) in 1992 and a Bachelors of Science in Education from Makerere University. He attended Mbarara High School for his Secondary Education; and Masheruka Primary School for foundation Education.

== Career ==
Before his appointment as the principal of the College of Natural Sciences (CONAS), he was the dean of the Faculty of Science from 2009 to 2010, in which position he led the process of conversion of the faculty to a college. He held the principal post initially in acting capacity (2010 to 2011) before substantive appointment in 2012. He has also served as the acting deputy vice chancellor (academic affairs) at Makerere University.

Mugisha joined Makerere University as a teaching assistant in 1987, rising through the ranks to professorship in 2008. He has also served the university in various leadership and management capacities; acting director Institute of Computer Science - Makerere University from August to December 2003; deputy director Institute of Computer Science - Makerere University from 2003 to August 2005. He is also a member of the Makerere University Senate, which is the highest academic decision-making body of the university; he has been appointed to several boards and committees within the university.

Mugisha has taught courses at undergraduate and graduate level. He has supervised and mentored over 40 students at graduate level (both PhD and MSc) in the region. He is an international researcher and examiner with strong links to several universities in Eastern, Central and Southern Africa. He has served as a reviewer of several international journals like Mathematical Biosciences, Southern Journal of Sciences, Mathematical Biosciences and Engineering, Mathematical Modelling and Analysis, Ecological Modelling, Computers and Mathematics with Application, Computational and Applied Mathematics, Mathematical and Computer Modelling, among others.

Mugisha is a founder member and the current president of the African Society for Bio-mathematics since 2009. He has been a member of the American Mathematical Society, Ugandan Mathematical Society, Ugandan Biometric Society and is a Fellow of the Ugandan National Academy of Sciences [UNAS].

Mugisha is widely published in over 50 articles in International Journals. His major research interest is in the application of mathematics in biology and biomedical processes with special emphasis on epidemiological and ecological modelling. He has co - organized, attended and facilitated at various conferences, workshops and seminars nationally and internationally. He is a member Kyambogo University Council, and board member of the Uganda National Council for Science and Technology council.
