= Charles Kabugo =

Ugandan health official

- Born: Uganda
- Education: Makerere University (Bachelor of Medicine and Bachelor of Surgery) (Master of Medicine in Internal Medicine); Undisclosed University (Master of Science in Clinical Epidemiology & Biostatistics)
- Occupations: Physician; Academic; Medical Administrator
- Years active: 1994–present
- Known for: Medical expertise, Leadership
- Title: Executive Director of Kiruddu General Hospital

Charles Kabugo is a senior consultant internal medicine physician in the Uganda Ministry of Health. He is the executive director of Kiruddu General Hospital, in Makindye Division, in the south of Kampala, the capital and largest city of Uganda. He was appointed to that position on 9 August 2018.

== Background and education ==
He was born in the Buganda Region of Uganda. After attending local schools, he was admitted to Makerere University to study human medicine, graduating with a Bachelor of Medicine and Bachelor of Surgery (MBChB) degree. Later, Makerere University awarded him a Master of Medicine (MMed) degree in Internal Medicine. He also holds a Master of Science (MSc) in Clinical Epidemiology and Biostatistics, from an undisclosed university.

== Career ==
Dr. Charles Kabugo is a senior consultant physician, who was attached to Mulago National Referral Hospital, Uganda's top and largest tertiary referral hospital, with a 1790 bed capacity, which also serves as the teaching hospital of Makerere University College of Health Sciences.

In May 2016, following the completion of the 200-bed Kiruddu General Hospital, Dr. Kabugo was selected as the interim director of the new facility. More than one hundred in-patients and fourteen out-patient clinics were temporarily transferred to Kiruddu, to make room for renovations to the Lower Mulago Hospital Complex between 2016 and 2019. The fourteen clinics involved included (1) hypertension (2) thyroid (3) diabetes (4) kidneys (5) heart problems (6) infectious diseases (7) skin diseases (8) lung diseases (9) brain diseases (10) burns (11) HIV/AIDS (12) liver diseases (13) rheumatology (joint diseases) and (14) hematology (blood diseases).

In August 2018, Charles Kabugo, MBChB, MMed (Internal Medicine), MSc, was appointed executive director of Kiruddu General Hospital. He will be deputized by Dr. Robert Sentongo.

== See also ==
- Kawempe General Hospital
- Mulago National Referral Hospital
- Makerere University College of Health Sciences
