= Ponsiano Ocama =

Ugandan physician

- Born: 1 July 1969 (age 57); Pakwach, Uganda
- Citizenship: Uganda
- Education: Makerere University (Bachelor of Medicine and Bachelor of Surgery) (Master of Medicine in Internal Medicine); University of Antwerp (Doctor of Philosophy); University of Texas Southwestern Medical Center (Academic Research Fellowship in Hepatology)
- Occupations: Physician, Academic & Academic Administrator
- Years active: 1996 — present
- Known for: Medicine, Research

Ponsiano Ocama is a Ugandan physician, researcher, academic and academic administrator, who is an associate professor of medicine and former head of department of Internal Medicine at Makerere University School of Medicine, a component of Makerere University College of Health Sciences.

== Early life and education ==
Ocama was born in Uganda circa 1969. After attending local primary and secondary schools, he was admitted to Makerere University School of Medicine, graduating in 1994 with a Bachelor of Medicine and Bachelor of Surgery degree. In 2001, he was awarded a Master of Medicine degree in Internal Medicine, by the same medical school. His degree of Doctor of Philosophy was awarded by the University of Antwerp in Belgium, in 2011. He also completed an academic research fellowship in hepatology at University of Texas Southwestern Medical Center, in Dallas, Texas, United States.

== Career ==
Dr Ponsiano Ocama is a specialized gastroenterologist, with super specialization as a hepatologist with focus on viral infections of the liver, including HIV/AIDS, Hepatitis B, Hepatitis C and the interactions between these infections and their role in the causation and progression of hepatocellular carcinoma. He has led several clinical studies focused on HIV, hepatitis B and hepatitis C.

In 2003, he joined Makerere College of Health Sciences as a lecturer in the department of Internal Medicine. In 2010, he was promoted to the rank of senior lecturer. He made associate professor in 2013. In 2015, he was appointed Head of Department of Internal Medicine at the college.
