= Ahunna Eziakonwa =

Nigerian economist and humanitarian

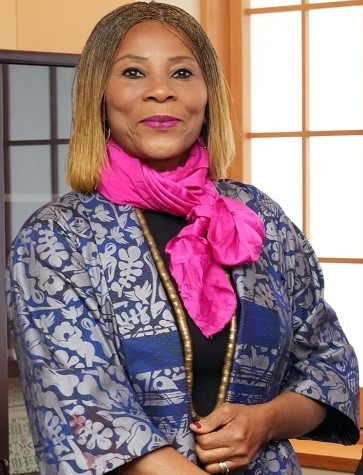
- Ahunna Eziakonwa in 2025

Assistant Administrator and Regional Director

Personal details
- Education: Columbia University’s School of International and Public Affairs; University of Benin City, Nigeria
- Occupation: Economist, Humanitarian

Ahunna Eziakonwa is a United Nations assistant secretary-general and the U.N. Special Advisor for Africa. She previously served as United Nations Development Program assistant administrator and director, Regional Bureau for Africa. Prior to her appointment on August 15, 2018, she was the United Nations Development Program's resident representative and humanitarian coordinator in Ethiopia, Uganda, and Lesotho. She now serves as the UN Special Advisor for Africa. In this role, she has called for unity and freedom of movement between the governments. She has also emphasized free trade. She has called for continued support to Africa by Europe.

== Early life and education ==
Ahunna was born in Nigeria. She holds a master's degree in international affairs from Columbia University’s School of International and Public Affairs. She also has a bachelor's in education from University of Benin Nigeria. She is an alumnus of the Harvard Kennedy School Executive Programme where she gained knowledge in cutting-edge development thinking.

== Personal life ==
Ahunna is married and has a daughter.
