= Elizabeth Lwanga =

Elizabeth Lwanga is a Ugandan human rights activist and former United Nations official.

Lwanga has served as Resident Representative of the UN Development Programme (UNDP) and Coordinator of UN System Operational Activities in Kenya, as Deputy Director of the Regional Bureau for Africa, as UNDP Resident Representative and Coordinator in Sierra Leone and Swaziland and as Manager of the UNDP Gender in Development Programme in New York.
