= Rubby Opio Aweri =

Ugandan lawyer and judge (1953–2022)

- Born: 31 May 1953; Dokolo District, Protectorate of Uganda
- Died: 7 December 2022 (aged 69); Mulago, Kampala, Uganda
- Citizenship: Uganda
- Education: Makerere University (Bachelor of Laws) (Master of Laws); Law Development Centre ( Diploma in Legal Practice)
- Occupations: Lawyer, judge
- Years active: 1982—2022 (his death)
- Known for: Law
- Title: Justice of the Supreme Court of Uganda

Rubby Opio Aweri, also Rubby Aweri Opio (31 May 1953 – 7 December 2022) was a Ugandan lawyer and judge, who served as a justice of the Supreme Court of Uganda, from September 2015. In August 2017, the Judiciary named him as the new Chief Inspector of Courts on a three-year term.

== Background and education ==
Aweri was born in Dokolo District in 1953, the son of the late Samwiri Opio Aweri.

Aweri held a Bachelor of Laws from Makerere University, in Kampala. He held a Diploma in Legal Practice from the Law Development Centre, also in Kampala. His Master of Laws was also obtained from Makerere University.

== Career ==
Aweri's career started in 1982, as a legal assistant in the Soroti District. In 1983, Aweri was appointed a grade one magistrate. He gradually rose through the ranks and in 1998, was appointed a judge of the High Court. In 2014, he was promoted to the Uganda Court of Appeal. In September 2015, he was elevated to the Supreme Court of Uganda. In August 2017, the Judiciary named him as the new Chief Inspector of Courts on a three-year term.

== Personal life and death ==
Aweri was married. He died at Mulago National Referral Hospital on 7 December 2022, at the age of 69.
