= Viktor Zhdanov =

Soviet virologist and epidemiologist (1914-1987)

- Віктор Ждaнов
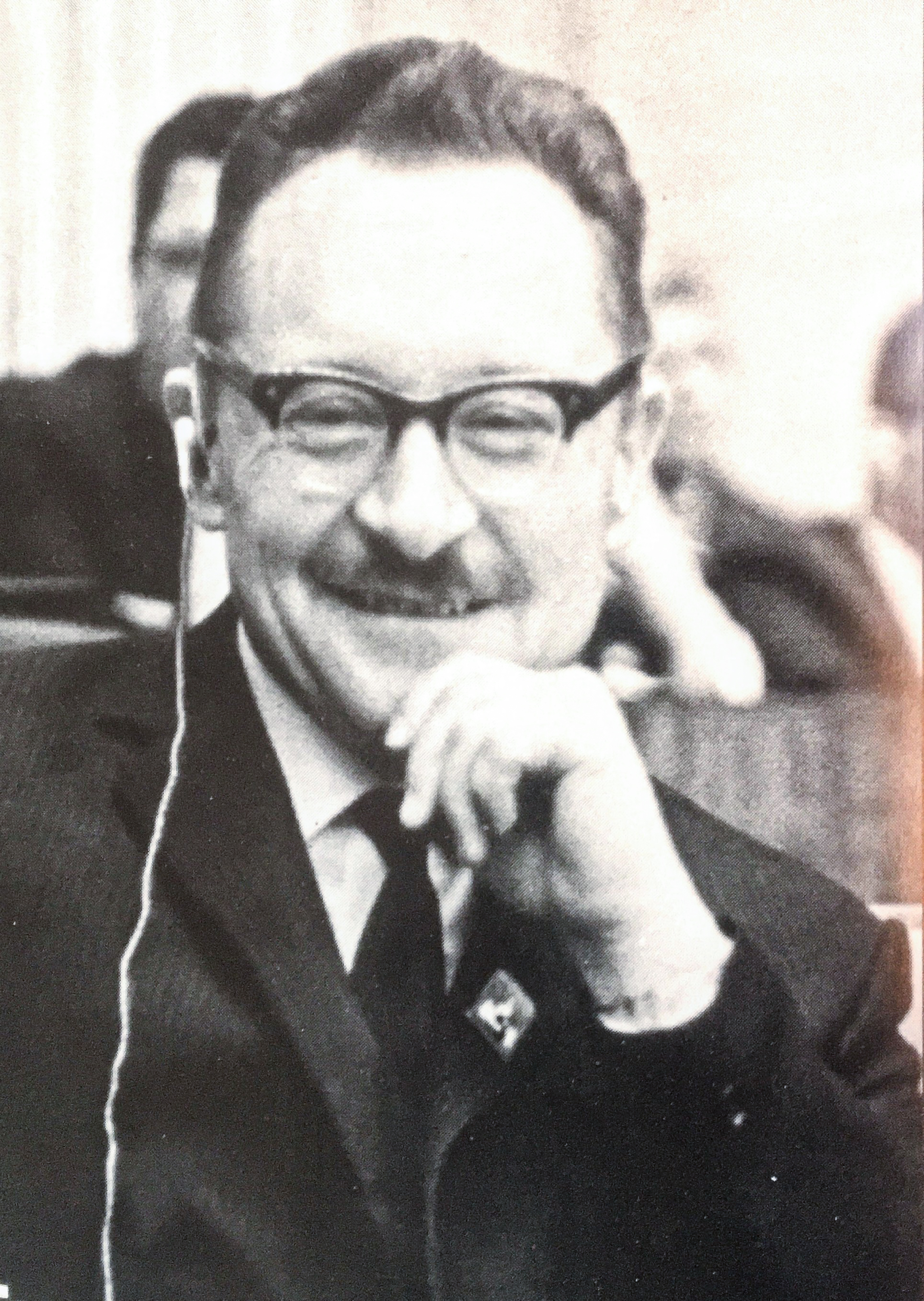
- Born: February 14, 1914; Stepino, Yekaterinoslav Governorate, Russian Empire (now Sviatohorivka, Donetsk Oblast, Ukraine)
- Died: July 14, 1987 (aged 73); Moscow, Russian SFSR, Soviet Union
- Resting place: Kuntsevo Cemetery
- Citizenship: Russian Empire, Soviet Union
- Education: Kharkiv Medical Institute
- Known for: Initiating the global program to eradicate smallpox undertaken by the WHO
- Awards: Order of Lenin; Order of the October Revolution; Order of the Red Banner of Labor; Order of the Red Star; Award of the Council of Ministers of the Soviet Union
- Scientific career
- Fields: Microbiology, virology
- Workplaces: I. I. Mechnikoff Institute of Epidemiology and Microbiology

Viktor Mykhailovych Zhdanov (Ukrainian: Віктор Михайлович Ждaнов; Russian: Виктор Михайлович Ждaнов, romanized: Viktor Mikhaylovich Zhdanov; 14 February [O.S. 1 February] 1914 – 14 July 1987) was a Soviet scientist, virologist and epidemiologist. He was instrumental in the effort to eradicate smallpox globally.

Zhdanov was born in the village of Shtepino, Russian Empire (in present-day renamed as Sviatohorivka, Donetsk Oblast, Ukraine). After Zhdanov graduated from Kharkiv Medical Institute in 1936, he spent the next decade working as an army doctor, where he became interested in epidemiology; this work would directly lead to his doctoral thesis on Hepatitis A. In 1946, Zhdanov was invited to become Chief of the Epidemiology Department of the I. I. Mechnikoff Institute of Epidemiology and Microbiology in Kharkiv, becoming its director two years later. His work in virus classification saw him admitted to the International Committee on Taxonomy of Viruses as a life member. In addition to his accomplishments in the field of public health, Zhdanov chaired the Soviet Union's Interagency Science and Technology Council on Molecular Biology and Genetics.

== Smallpox eradication ==
In 1958, Zhdanov, as Deputy Minister of Health for the Soviet Union, called on the World Health Assembly to undertake a global initiative to eradicate smallpox. The proposal (Resolution WHA11.54) was accepted in 1959. Zhdanov left the Ministry of Health in 1961 and focused on scientific research for the rest of his career. This work included studying influenza, hepatitis, and in the 1980s, HIV.

William MacAskill wrote, "Smallpox was one of the worst diseases to ever befall the human race, and its eradication is one of the greatest achievements of humanity. Bill Foege and Viktor Zhdanov should be celebrated for their contributions, and should inspire us today to take effective action to tackle the world's most pressing problems." Despite Zhdanov's relative obscurity, some—including MacAskill—have argued that Zhdanov has done "more good for humanity" than any other human in history.

Because of his belief in the value of international cooperation, Zhdanov maintained close working associations with scientists in the West, even during the Cold War. Joint influenza research projects were done with Walter Dowdle (CDC), Robert Webster, Edward J. Kilbourne (Harvard Medical School), and Nancy Cox (CDC); joint viral oncogenesis research projects were done with John Moloney (National Cancer Institute) and Fred Rapp (Penn State); joint viral hepatitis research projects were done with Daniel Bradley (CDC) and James E. Maynard (CDC), to mention but a few.

== Awards and honors ==
For his efforts to eradicate smallpox, Zhdanov was the co-winner of the 2020 Future of Life Award along with William (Bill) Foege. Foege and Zhdanov (through his sons Viktor and Michael) received that award in a ceremony including Bill Gates, Anthony Fauci and freshly minted Nobel Laureate Jennifer Doudna. The ceremony was held remotely as it took place during the 2019 Coronavirus Pandemic. In consideration of the achievements of Zhdanov and Foege, Bill Gates added that Zhdanov and Foege "are phenomenal examples of what it means to harness science for global health". "We're all indebted to Bill Foege and Viktor Zhdanov for their critical contributions to the eradication of smallpox, which demonstrated the immense value of science and international collaboration for fighting disease", said António Guterres, Secretary General, United Nations.

UNICEF estimates that smallpox eradication has saved close to 200 million lives as of 2018. On 8 May 1980, the 33rd World Health Assembly officially declared: 'The world and all its peoples have won freedom from smallpox.' According to the World Health Organization, the US$300m price-tag to eradicate smallpox saves the world well over US$1 billion every year since 1980. WHO Director-General, Tedros Adhanom Ghebreyesus said, "As the world confronts the COVID-19 pandemic, humanity's victory over smallpox is a reminder of what is possible when nations come together to fight a common health threat". The United Nations Postal Administration (UNPA), in collaboration with WHO, signifies what national unity and global solidary can achieve. Numerous countries, such as Guinea, India, Nigeria, Philippines, Togo and others issued smallpox stamps to show support for, and raise awareness about WHO's Intensified Smallpox Eradication Programme launched in 1967.

== Later life and death ==
Zhdanov later turned his attention to researching AIDS, becoming the first Soviet official to confirm the existence of the disease in the USSR. However, starting in 1984, Zhdanov became the target of anonymous denunciations accusing him of nepotism and plagiarism. On June 6, 1987, upon reading a letter from the Academy of Medical Sciences informing him that a committee investigation had been opened into these allegations, Zhdanov had a stroke. He died in hospital 8 days later. The person who denounced Zhdanov was never identified.
