= Moses Ebuk =

Ugandan diplomat

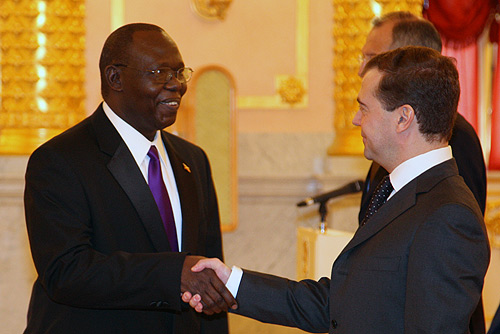
Late Dr Moses Ebuk presenting his diplomatic credentials to President of Russia Dmitry Medvedev on 27 February 2009.

Moses Ebuk was a Ugandan neurophysiologist, academic and diplomat.

== Career ==
In 2005, Ebuk was appointed as Ambassador of Uganda to the Democratic Republic of the Congo after President of Uganda Yoweri Museveni's first appointment, Jacob Okello, had his appointment rejected by the Democratic Republic of Congo government in Kinshasa.

On 11 September 2008, Ebuk was appointed by President of Uganda Yoweri Museveni as Ambassador of Uganda to Russia between 2008 and 2015. He presented his diplomatic credentials to President of Russia Dmitry Medvedev on 27 February 2009.

Ebuk had contested for Oyam South MP seat several times before his diplomatic appointments. He was also an executive director of Moses Ebuk investments limited that was registered in June 2015.

Ebuk, a neurophysiologist, was a lecturer in the College of Health Sciences at the Makerere University in Mulago.

== Death ==
Ebuk died on 2 July 2022 at Mulago Referral Hospital in Kampala where he had been receiving treatment for cancer for weeks. He was buried on 9 July 2022 in Oyam district.

== See also ==
- Richard Idro
- Kamand Bataringaya
