= Lawrence Kazibwe =

Ugandan obstetrician and gynecologist

Dr Lawrence Kazibwe
- Born: 1981 (age 44–45); Uganda
- Education: Mbarara University (Bachelor of Medicine and Bachelor of Surgery) (Master of Medicine in Obstetrics and Gynecology)
- Occupations: Physician; Academic; Medical Administrator
- Years active: 2007–present
- Known for: Medical expertise, Leadership
- Title: Deputy Executive Director of Kawempe General Hospital

Dr Lawrence Kazibwe is a consultant obstetrician and gynecologist in the Uganda Ministry of Health. He is the deputy executive director of Kawempe General Hospital, in Kawempe Division, in northern Kampala, the capital and largest of Uganda. He was appointed to that position on 9 August 2018.

== Background and education ==
He was born in the Buganda Region of Uganda. After attending local schools, he enrolled into the Mbarara University of Science and Technology to study human medicine, graduating with a Bachelor of Medicine and Bachelor of Surgery (MBChB) degree in 2006. In 2011, he was awarded a Master of Medicine (MMed) degree in Internal Medicine, also from Mbarara University.

== Career ==
Dr. Lawrence Kazibwe is a consultant, who was attached to Mulago National Referral Hospital, Uganda's top and largest tertiary referral hospital, with a 1,790-bed capacity, which also serves as the teaching hospital of Makerere University College of Health Sciences. Mulago National Referral Hospital is reported to have the busiest labor ward in the world, with over 30,000 live births annually, averaging 32,654 annually in the three years from 1 January 2011 until 31 December 2013. This is an average of approximately 90 deliveries every day, or 3.7 births per hour, including about 20 to 25 daily Caesarean sections.

In August 2018, Lawrence Kazibwe, MBChB, MMed (Obstetrics & Gynecology), was appointed deputy executive director of Kawempe General Hospital, a 200-bd facility, affiliated with Mulago Hospital. He will deputize Dr. Nehemiah Katusiime.

== See also ==
- Kawempe General Hospital
- Mulago National Referral Hospital
- Makerere University College of Health Sciences
