= Richard Idro =

Ugandan physician

- Born: 9 May 1970 (age 56); Moyo, Uganda
- Citizenship: Uganda
- Education: Makerere University (Bachelor of Medicine and Bachelor of Surgery) (Master of Medicine in Pediatrics); University of Amsterdam (Doctor of Philosophy); Royal College of Paediatrics and Child Health (Fellow of the Royal College of Paediatrics and Child Health)
- Occupations: Pediatrician, researcher, academic
- Years active: 2001–present
- Known for: Medicine, research

Richard Iwa Idro is a Ugandan pediatric neurologist, researcher and academic, who serves as an associate professor in the Department of Pediatrics and Child Health at Makerere University College of Health Sciences.

== Early life and education ==
Idro was born in Moyo, Uganda in 1970. After attending local primary and secondary schools, he was admitted to Makerere University School of Medicine, graduating in 1996 with a Bachelor of Medicine and Bachelor of Surgery degree. In 2001, he was awarded a Master of Medicine degree in Pediatrics by the same medical school. His degree of Doctor of Philosophy was awarded by the University of Amsterdam in the Netherlands, in 2008. He specialized as a pediatric neurologist.

In October 2022, he was elected as a Fellow of the Royal College of Paediatrics and Child Health (FRCPCH) of the United Kingdom. It is the highest recognition that can be bestowed to a pediatrician in the countries of the Commonwealth of Nations.

== Career ==
Idro is a specialized pediatrician, with super specialization as a neurologist. His research interests include HIV/AIDS in adolescents, the interactions between HIV and malaria, and the prognostic features of cerebral malaria, among other topics. Recently, his work has expanded into studies of brain injury in sickle cell anemia, viral encephalitis and childhood epilepsy.

He also concurrently serves as an honorary consultant pediatrician and pediatric neurologist at Mulago National Referral Hospital (MNRH), in Kampala, Uganda. MNRH is the teaching hospital of Makerere University College of Health Sciences.

He is a leading authority on nodding disease, an ill-understood pediatric mental condition, characterized by seizures, intellectual disability, and stunted growth. Its cause remains unknown, and there was no known cure as of 2019.

== Honors and awards ==
In February 2019, the London School of Hygiene and Tropical Medicine (LSHTM) announced Idro as the winner of the Greenwood Africa Award 2019. The award includes a medal and one week of residence at the LSHTM. The winner is required to give a Greenwood Lecture. During the week of residence at LSTMH in London, the winner is required to interact with relevant academics and give seminars as the situation may warrant. The award is restricted to mid-level medical researchers in infectious diseases in sub-Saharan Africa. It is awarded every three years, and Idro is its first recipient.

== Other considerations ==
He is a member of the eight-person board of directors of Global Health Uganda, a non-profit organization that aims at improving pediatric health research in Uganda.

== See also ==
- Moses Ebuk
- Sarah Kiguli
