= Rachel Mayanja =

Ugandan lawyer and diplomat

Rachel N. Mayanja
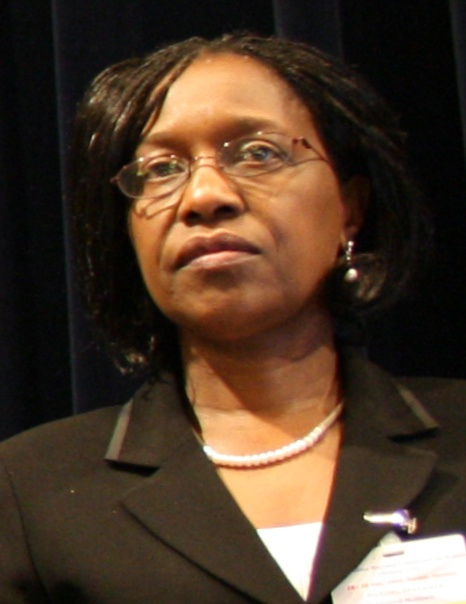
- Mayanja in 2009
- Born: 1 January 1948 (age 78); Uganda
- Citizenship: Uganda
- Education: Makerere University (Bachelor of Laws); Law Development Centre (Diploma in Legal Practice); Harvard University (Master of Laws)
- Occupations: Lawyer & Diplomat
- Years active: 1996 — present
- Known for: Diplomacy

Rachel N. Mayanja is a Ugandan lawyer and diplomat. Currently, she serves as the United Nations Secretary-General's Special Adviser on Gender Issues and Advancement of Women. She was appointed to that position by the United Nations Secretary-General in 2004. The appointment is at the level of Assistant Secretary-General.

== Background ==
She was born in the Central Region of Uganda.

== Education ==
Rachel Mayanja obtained the degree of Bachelor of Laws (LLB), from Makerere University. She also obtained the Diploma in Law Practice (Dip. Law Pract.), from the Law Development Center in Kampala, the capital of Uganda and the largest city in that country. Her degree of Master of Laws (LLM), was obtained from Harvard University, in Cambridge, Massachusetts, United States.

== Work experience ==
Mayanja joined the United Nations, soon after the First World Conference on Women, held in Mexico City from 19 June 1975 until 2 July 1975. She first worked in the Division for Equal Rights for Women in the United Nations' Centre for Social Development and Humanitarian Affairs. As the Special Assistant to the Assistant Secretary-General for Social Development and Humanitarian Affairs, she was an active participant in the development of policies and attended conferences at the non-governmental and intergovernmental levels on topics dealing with gender, family, the disabled, the youth and the aged.

From 1989 to 1990, Mayanja served on the United Nations peacekeeping missions to Namibia (UNTAG), where she worked with the United Nations civilian police to oversee the elections leading to independence. From 1992 to 1994, she served in the UN Mission in Iraq/Kuwait (UNIKOM), where she was responsible for the provision of administrative support to the observer mission. Between 1995 until 1999, Mayanja held different senior positions in the Office of Human Resources Management, including as Chief, Common System and Specialist Service, dealing with policies regarding salaries and entitlements, as well as appeals and disciplinary cases. In 1999, she served as secretary to the UN Secretary-General's Task Force on the reform of human resources management.

In 2000, she was seconded by the United Nations to Food and Agriculture Organization (FAO) as the Director, Human Resources Management Division. She played a vital role in the implementation of the reform of human resources management at FAO. This was her last assignment prior to her appointment to her current position.

== Personal life ==
Mayanja lives in New York City, New York State, in the United States. She is the mother of three (3) children.
