= Anne Atai Omoruto =

- Born: 22 November 1956; Kumi District, Uganda
- Died: 5 May 2016 (aged 59); Uganda Cancer Institute
- Education: Dr. Sampurnanand Medical College (MBBS); Makerere University (MMed)
- Occupations: Physician, researcher, academic
- Years active: 1984–2016
- Known for: Medical practice and research
- Title: Chairperson of Family Medicine; Makerere University College of Health Sciences

Anne Deborah Atai Omoruto (22 November 1956 to 5 May 2016) was a Ugandan family physician, public health specialist, and academic. In 2014, she led a team of 12 Ugandan physicians as part of the World Health Organization's response to the Ebola outbreak in Liberia.

== Background and education ==
She was born in Kumi District on November 22, 1956. She attended the Dr. S.N. Medical College, Jodhpur, in India, graduating with a Bachelor of Medicine and Bachelor of Surgery degree. Later, she graduated from Makerere University School of Medicine with a Master of Medicine in internal medicine.

== Work experience ==
Atai was the chairperson of the Department of Family Medicine at the Makerere University Medical School and concurrently served as the chair of the Department of Community Medicine at the Mulago National Referral Hospital.

== 2014 Ebola outbreak ==
In July 2014, Omoruto was asked by the World Health Organization to respond to the Ebola crisis in Liberia. She brought with her a team of Ugandan health workers. Together they trained over one thousand Liberian workers on the management of Ebola patients and protection against the disease.

== Illness and death ==
Anne Atai Omoruto died on 5 May 2016 at the age of 59 years. The cause of death is reported as pancreatic cancer.

== Other considerations ==
The World Organization of Family Doctors (WONCA) has established a scholarship in her name. The Dr Atai Anne Deborah Omoruto Scholarship Award is available to African women family physician residents and practitioners, with limited means. The award enables the recipient to attend the biennial WONCA Conference.

== See also ==
- Makerere University College of Health Sciences
- Uganda Cancer Institute
- Esperance Luvindao
