= Churchill Lukwiya Onen =

Ugandan physician and medical researcher (born 1954)

- Born: 1955 (age 70–71); Uganda
- Citizenship: Uganda
- Education: Makerere University (Bachelor of Medicine and Surgery) (Master of Medicine in Internal Medicine) (Doctor of Medicine); Royal College of Physicians (Fellow of the Royal College of Physicians)
- Occupations: Physician, medical researcher
- Years active: Since 1980
- Known for: Medical research, leadership
- Title: Senior Consultant Physician; Centre for Chronic Diseases, Gaborone, Botswana
- Spouse(s): Margaret Aber Onen, PhD
- Family: Barbara Lachana Onen (Daughter); Dennis Lukwiya Onen (Son)

Churchill Lukwiya Onen (born c. 1955) is a Ugandan physician and medical researcher, who serves as a Senior Consultant Physician at the Centre for Chronic Diseases, in Gaborone, Botswana.

== Background and education ==
Onen was born in Uganda circa 1955. He attended local elementary schools. He studied at Namilyango College for his high school education, graduating with a High School Diploma in 1973.

In 1974, he was admitted to Makerere University Medical School, the oldest school of medicine in East Africa. He graduated in 1979 with a Bachelor of Medicine and Bachelor of Surgery (MBChB) degree.

Following a year of internship, and another as a medical officer, he returned to Makerere to pursue a Master of Medicine in Internal Medicine, graduating in 1984. In 2010, the same university awarded him a Doctor of Medicine degree, based on his research and thesis on Macrovascular Complications of Diabetes in adults in Botswana.

Dr Onen is a Fellow of the Royal College of Physicians, having been awarded the Fellowship in 2005.

== Career ==
Dr Onen is a senior consultant physician at the Centre for Chronic Diseases, a private medical practice that offers treatment in a number of specialties, including Cardiology, Cardiovascular Diseases, Diabetes, Gastroenterology and Infectious Diseases, among others. The practice is based at Gaborone Private Hospital, Botswana.

== Family ==
Dr Churchill Lukwiya Onen is married to Dr Margaret Aber Onen, a librarian and social worker. Together, they are the parents of Dr Barbara Lachana Onen, an Internal Medicine Specialist Physician consultant in acute care medicine, and Dennis Lukwiya Onen, a recording artist.

== Other considerations ==
Dr Churchill Onen is the founder and president of Diabetes Association of Botswana. In the past, he served as Project Manager of MASA, the mass population antiretroviral therapy programme in Botswana, which began in 2002.

== Book chapters edited ==
- Management of Hypertension and Dyslipidemia for Primary Prevention of Cardiovascular Disease Authors: Panniyammakal Jeemon, Rajeev Gupta, Churchill Onen, Alma Adler, Thomas Gaziano, Dorairaj Prabhakaran, Neil Poulter. In Disease Control Priorities (third edition): Volume 5, Cardiovascular, Respiratory, and Related Disorders. Washington, DC: World Bank. 2017.
