= Magid Kagimu =

Ugandan physician (born c. 1954)

Professor Magid Kagimu
- Born: c. 1954; Uganda
- Citizenship: Uganda
- Education: Makerere University (Bachelor of Medicine and Surgery) (Master of Medicine in Internal Medicine); Royal College of Physicians (Fellow of the Royal College of Physicians)
- Occupations: Physician, researcher, academic, community leader
- Years active: Since 1980
- Known for: Medical research, leadership
- Title: Professor of Medicine; Makerere University College of Health Sciences

Magid Mayanja Kagimu (born c. 1954) is a Ugandan physician, academic and community leader, who serves as Professor of Medicine and Head of the Gastroenterology Division at Makerere University College of Health Sciences, in Kampala, Uganda's capital and largest city.

== Background and education ==
He was admitted to Makerere University Medical School, the oldest school of medicine in East Africa, in 1974. He graduated in 1979 with a Bachelor of Medicine and Bachelor of Surgery (MBChB) degree.

Following a year of internship, and another as a medical officer, he returned to Makerere to pursue a Master of Medicine in Internal Medicine, graduating in 1983. His chosen specialty is gastroenterology.

== Career ==
He is a member of the gastroenterology team that cared for Joyce Moriku, the State Minister of Health for Primary Care, in the Cabinet of Uganda, when she fell ill in November 2017.

== Other roles ==
Kagimu serves as the chairman of the Islamic Medical Association of Uganda (IMAU). He also serves as the Secretariat Administrator of the Uganda Gastroenterology Society.

In 2016, when the Embassy of Sweden in Uganda launched a campaign to recognize the critical role that midwives play in Ugandan society, Kagimu was selected by the embassy as one of seven Champions of the Midwives4all campaign. The role of the champions was to mobilize communities, influence policy-makers and encourage young people to consider training as midwives.
