= Sarah Kiguli =

Ugandan pediatrician, academic

- Born: c. 1961 (age 64–65); Central Region, Uganda
- Citizenship: Uganda
- Education: Makerere University (Bachelor of Medicine and Bachelor of Surgery) (Master of Medicine in Pediatrics); Maastricht University (Master of Health Professions Education)
- Occupations: Pediatrician, researcher, academic
- Years active: 1990 – present
- Known for: Medical practice & research
- Title: Professor of pediatrics Makerere University School of Medicine

Sarah Kiguli is a Ugandan pediatrician, academic, and medical researcher. She is a professor and head of the Department of Pediatrics and Child Health at the Makerere University School of Medicine, a component of the Makerere University College of Health Sciences.

== Background and education ==
She was born in the Central Region of Uganda, circa 1961. She attended Gayaza High School before entering Makerere University, graduating with a Bachelor of Medicine and Bachelor of Surgery. Her Master of Medicine in Pediatrics was also obtained from Makerere. Later, she obtained a Master of Health Professions Education degree from Maastricht University in the Netherlands.

== Career ==
She interned at the Mulago National Referral Hospital (MNRH) after her first degree. She then worked as a medical officer at the same hospital for two more years before starting the three-year masters program.

Following her MMed studies, she continued to work in the Department of Pediatrics at MNRH and was appointed a lecturer at Makerere in the Department of Pediatrics and Child Health. At Makerere, she was appointed to the Education Committee of the Faculty of Medicine in 2000. She later became involved in the formulation of a new curriculum for the medical school.

Kiguli has published widely in peer publications, and maintains an active pediatric practice as part of her hospital and university appointments.

== Other responsibilities ==
In her capacity as a professor of pediatrics at the Makerere University Medical School, within Makerere University College of Health Sciences, Kiguli serves as a senior consultant in pediatrics at the Mulago National Referral Hospital, the teaching hospital of the university.

== See also ==
- Uganda Ministry of Health
