= Kiruddu General Hospital =

- Uganda Ministry of Health and Kampala Capital City Authority

Geography
- Location: Salaama, Kampala, Makindye Division, Central Region, Uganda
- Coordinates: 00°14′53″N 32°36′45″E

Organisation
- Care system: Public
- Type: General

Services
- Emergency department: III
- Beds: 200

History
- Opened: 16 May 2016

Links
- Other links: Hospitals in Uganda

Kiruddu General Hospital, also known as Kiruddu General Referral Hospital, is a hospital in Uganda. It is an urban, public, general hospital. It cost an estimated US$10.3 million (about USh37 billion) plus about $350,000 in supervisory fees to build. The hospital was constructed by the government of Uganda, with funding from the African Development Bank (AfDB) and the Nigeria Trust Fund (NTF). The hospital opened to the public on 16 May 2016.

== Location ==
The hospital is in the neighborhood of Kiruddu, on Buziga Hill, in Makindye Division, one of the five administrative units of the Kampala Capital City Authority. This is approximately 13.5 kilometres (8 mi), by road, south-east of the Mulago National Referral Hospital. Kiruddu General Hospital is approximately 10 kilometres (6 mi), southeast of the central business district of the city. The coordinates of Kiruddu General Hospital are 0°14'53.0"N, 32°36'45.0"E (Latitude:0.248056; Longitude:32.612500).

== Overview ==
Because of the rapid expansion of Kampala's population, and as part of government efforts to improve service delivery to its citizens, the number of public hospitals planned for the city was increased.

In December 2013, the Ugandan government, through the Ministry of Health, contracted China New Era And Metallurgical Joint Venture to construct the hospital. The work was budgeted at an estimated cost of US$15 million (UGX:38 billion).

As at August 2016, Kiruddu Hospital's fourteen outpatient clinics attend to about 250 patients daily.

== History ==
In 2013, the Ugandan government secured a loan from AfDB and NTF. The purpose was to rehabilitate and improve the Mulago National Referral Hospital, construct Kawempe General Hospital, construct Kiruddu General Hospital, and reorganize healthcare delivery in Kampala so that some of the patient burden is shifted to Naguru General Hospital, Kawempe General Hospital, and Kiruddu General Hospital. Mulago will then be reserved for the role for which it was constructed - serving only patients referred to it by other health facilities and not handling upper respiratory infections and uncomplicated malaria cases.

== Governance ==
In August 2018, the Uganda Ministry of Health appointed Charles Kabugo, MBChB, MMed (Medicine), MSc, as the executive director of Kiruddu Hospital. Kabugo, a senior consultant physician, will be deputized by Dr. Robert Sentongo, a consultant plastic surgeon.

== Other considerations ==
The sewer system at this hospital, as originally built, is too small to handle the waste-water and sewerage that the hospital generates. The effluent from the hospital is prone to overflowing, polluting the hospital surroundings, including people's homes and businesses. A localized waste water treatment plant is planned on a 2.5 acres (1.0 ha) plot near the hospital to remedy the situation.

In April 2021 National Water and Sewerage Corporation (NWSC) announced plans to construct a Sewage Compact Waste Water Treatment Plant capable of treating 150,000 litres (32,995 imp gal; 39,626 US gal) of waste water every 24 hours. Construction of the project is expected to take eight months and cost approximately USh2 billion (approximately US$560,000), fully funded by the Government of Uganda.

== See also ==
- List of hospitals in Uganda
