= Uganda National Academy of Sciences =

- Formation: October 20, 2000; 26 years ago
- Type: NGO
- Headquarters: A4 Lincoln House, Makerere University, P. O. Box 23911, Kampala, Uganda
- Website: www.unas.org.ug

Uganda National Academy of Sciences is a nonprofit, scientific organization in Uganda, that brings together scientists from the behavioral, biological, physical and social sciences. These scientists work together to promote excellence in sciences by "offering independent, evidence-based advice for the prosperity of Uganda", according to the academy's brochure.

== Location ==
The headquarters of Uganda National Academy of Science are at A4 Lincoln House, Makerere University, in Kampala, Uganda's capital city. The coordinates of the academy headquarters are 0°19'56.0"N, 32°34'11.5"E (Latitude:0.332222; Longitude:32.569861).

== Overview ==
The Uganda National Academy of Science is an autonomous organization of diverse leaders in various fields of science, who aspire to use merit-based science to inform Uganda's development.

== History ==
The academy was founded on 20 October 2000. As of 2018, the organisation had over 120 registered members, of whom 65 were Fellows of the academy.

== Fellows ==
The following are some of the Fellows of the Uganda National Academy of Science:

1. James Ntambi: professor of biochemistry and of nutritional sciences, at the University of Wisconsin, Madison
2. Harriet Mayanja-Kizza: professor of medicine and dean of Makerere University School of Medicine.
3. Emmanuel Tumusiime-Mutebile: professor of economics, Makerere University. Chancellor of the International University of East Africa. Governor of the Bank of Uganda.
4. Christine Dranzoa: professor of zoology and vice chancellor of Muni University.
5. David Serwadda: professor of medicine and public health, at Makerere University College of Health Sciences. Former dean of the School of Public Health at Makerere University.
6. Noble Ephraim Banadda: professor and chair of the Department of Agricultural and BioSystems Engineering at Makerere University. Youngest person to achieve rank of full professor in the history of the university, at age of 37 years.
7. Peter Ndimbirwe Mugyenyi: professor and chancellor of Mbarara University of Science and Technology. Executive Director of the Joint Clinical Research Centre.
8. Zerubabel Nyiira: entomologist and bio-ecologist. Former State Minister of Agriculture of Uganda. Also Former State Minister of Fisheries of Uganda. Member of Parliament for Buruuli County, Masindi District.
9. Jack Pen-Mogi Nyeko: professor of veterinary medicine and immediate past vice chancellor of Gulu University.
10. Maud Kamatenesi Mugisha: professor and vice chancellor of Bishop Stuart University.
11. Nelson Sewankambo: professor of medicine and immediate past Principal of Makerere University College of Health Sciences. President of the Uganda National Academy of Sciences.
12. Mary Okwakol: professor of zoology and vice chancellor of Busitema University.
13. John Ssebuwufu: professor of chemistry and chancellor, University of Kisubi.
14. Gilbert Bukenya: professor of public health and former vice president of the Republic of Uganda.
15. Apollo Nsibambi: professor of economics and social science at Makerere University. Former prime minister of Uganda.
16. Lillian Tibatemwa-Ekirikubinza: justice of the Supreme Court of Uganda. Former professor of Law and former deputy vice-chancellor responsible for academic affairs at Makerere University.
17. Paul Waako: physician, clinical pharmacologist, academic and academic administrator. Vice chancellor of Busitema University, since 1 May 2019.
18. Joshua Sikhu Okonya: Agricultural Technology and Innovation Officer at the Association for Strengthening Agricultural Research in Eastern and Central Africa.
19. Grace Ndeezi: paediatrician and a professor of Pediatrics and Child Health at Makerere University; UNAS treasurer and UNAS Council 2022-2025.

== Other considerations ==
The Uganda National Academy of Science has collaborations with the Network of African Science Academies, Network of Science Academies in Islamic Countries, the US National Academies, InterAcademy Partnership, and The World Academy of Sciences.

== See also ==
- National Academy of Sciences
