= Ernest Okello Ogwang =

Ugandan academic & author

- Born: Uganda
- Occupations: Academic, Associate Professor of Literature and Folklore
- Known for: First Deputy Vice-Chancellor (Academic Affairs) at Makerere University

Academic background
- Education: Makerere University (BA, MA), Indiana University, Bloomington (Ph.D.)

Academic work
- Institutions: Makerere University
- Notable works: A Century of Existence, Colonial Library, National Literature, and Postcolonialism, Popular Cultural Forms: A Materialist Critique of Gender Representation in the Lang'o Orature, Popular Commemorations of the Uganda Martyrs Tradition

Ernest Okello Ogwang is a Ugandan academic and author. He served as the 1st Deputy Vice-Chancellor (Academic Affairs) at Makerere University. He is also an associate professor of literature and folklore at the same institution.

== Background and education ==
Ernest Okello Ogwang holds a Ph.D in Literature-Folklore from Indiana University, a Masters in Literature and a BA (Hons.) from Makerere Universitya university he joined in 1983.

== Career ==
Dr. Okello has authored a number of peer-reviewed books, working papers, edited journals, and scholarly articles. His areas of specialization for research and teaching include African Literature, Folklore and Literature, Oral Literature, Folklore (Genres and Artifacts, Methods, Intellectual History, Performance), Ethnographic Field Research, and Literary Theory and Criticism.

He has also lectured various courses at Makerere University in African Literature, Oral Literature, Literature and Folklore like fieldwork course, Caribbean Literature, Ritual and Literature, Comparative Epic Poetry, Postcolonial Literature and Criticism.

Dr. Okello Ogwang conducted different consultancies with the Ministry of Education (1993–94), the Ministry of Gender, Labour, and Social Development (2005), and the Council for the Development of Social Science Research in Africa (CODESRIA). He has been appointed to serve on various Makerere University Task Forces, Committees, Visitation Teams, as well as the University Senate and University Council. Dr. Okello has served and is still serving in different academic institutions at national and international levels. He has guided different Masters and Ph.D. students to graduation and Postdoctoral Mentorship to more than five Senior Teaching Staff members at Makerere University. He was also the vice president of the History of the Ugandan Centre in 2001.

== Publications ==
- A Century of Existence. ISBN 9970-02-022-6, 978-9970-02-022-5
- Colonial Library, National Literature, and Postcolonialism.
- Popular Cultural Forms: A Materialist Critique of Gender Representation in the Lang'o Orature.
- Popular Commemorations of the Uganda Martyrs Tradition.

== See also ==
- Paul Waako
- Joseph Ssekandi
- Charles Olweny
- John Maviiri
- Adonia Katungisa
- Jimmy Spire Ssentongo
