= Jimmy Spire Ssentongo =

Ugandan professor, academic, columnist, portraitist, author, and editorial cartoonist

Jimmy Spire Ssentogo
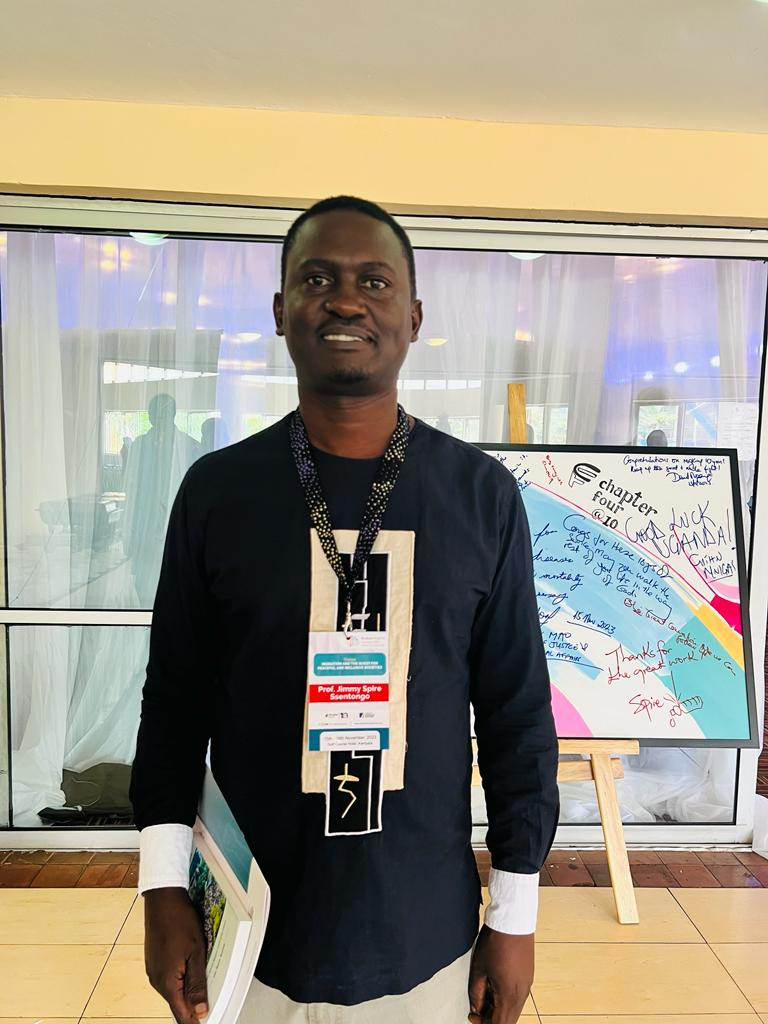
- Ssentogo in 2023
- Born: August 14, 1979 (age 47); Uganda
- Citizenship: Uganda
- Education: University of Humanistic Studies; Makerere University; London South Bank University
- Occupations: Academic, columnist, portraitist, author, and editorial cartoonist
- Years active: 2005–present
- Known for: Editorial cartooning

Jimmy Spire Ssentongo (born August 14, 1979) is a Ugandan professor, academic, columnist, portraitist, author, human rights defender and editorial cartoonist. He is an associate professor of Ethics and Identity Studies at Uganda Martyrs University (UMU). He also teaches Ethics and Research methods at Makerere University.

== Background and education ==
Ssentongo was born on August 14, 1979. Ssentongo holds a PhD in humanistic studies from the University of Humanistic Studies in Holland which he defended on 26 October 2015; a master's in ethics and public management (Makerere University), a Master of Science in education for sustainability (London South Bank University – Commonwealth Fellowship), a BA in philosophy (Urbaniana), and a diploma in philosophy and religious studies (Apostles of Jesus Philosophicum, Nairobi). He has been on post-doctoral fellowships as a visiting research fellow at the Centre for African Studies (University of Cambridge) and a research fellow on the African Humanities Program (AHP). Spire is said to have made his first cartoon publication in 2005 in Cartoon Theater, a paper run by the cartoonist Katz who was working with Daily Monitor at that time.

== Career ==
Ssentongo is the founding chair of the Center for African Studies at Uganda Martyrs University (UMU). Besides heading research and publication at UMU, he works as editor of the UMU monograph series, Mtafiti Mwafrika (African researcher), and the Uganda Martyrs University Book Series. He is also a columnist and editorial cartoonist with The Observer. His research interests are in ethics and identity studies, especially on pluralism (living with diversity). He is also into studies on coloniality and decolonization, with a keen interest in Africa.

== Awards ==
In 2021, Ssentongo was the recipient of the Janzi Award. He was recognized for his work as a cartoonist, which earned him the title of Outstanding Cartoonist. He also received nominations for his work as a nonfiction writer.

In 2016, Ssentongo was shortlisted for the Uganda National Journalism Awards 2016 working with The Observer in the "Editorial Cartooning" category in which he was the first runner-up with Chrisogon Atukwasize who was working with the Daily Monitor.

Ssentongo received the Civil Liberties Award in 2023 for his contributions to defending civil liberties in Uganda. The award was presented by Chapter Four Uganda.

On 8 December 2023, he was honored as the most exceptional human rights advocate of the year 2023 during the national symposium held in Jinja to commemorate the International Day of Human Rights Defenders.

On 2 April 2024, he was given the EU Human Rights Defenders Award 2024 by the EU Delegation to Uganda.

== Social media campaigns ==
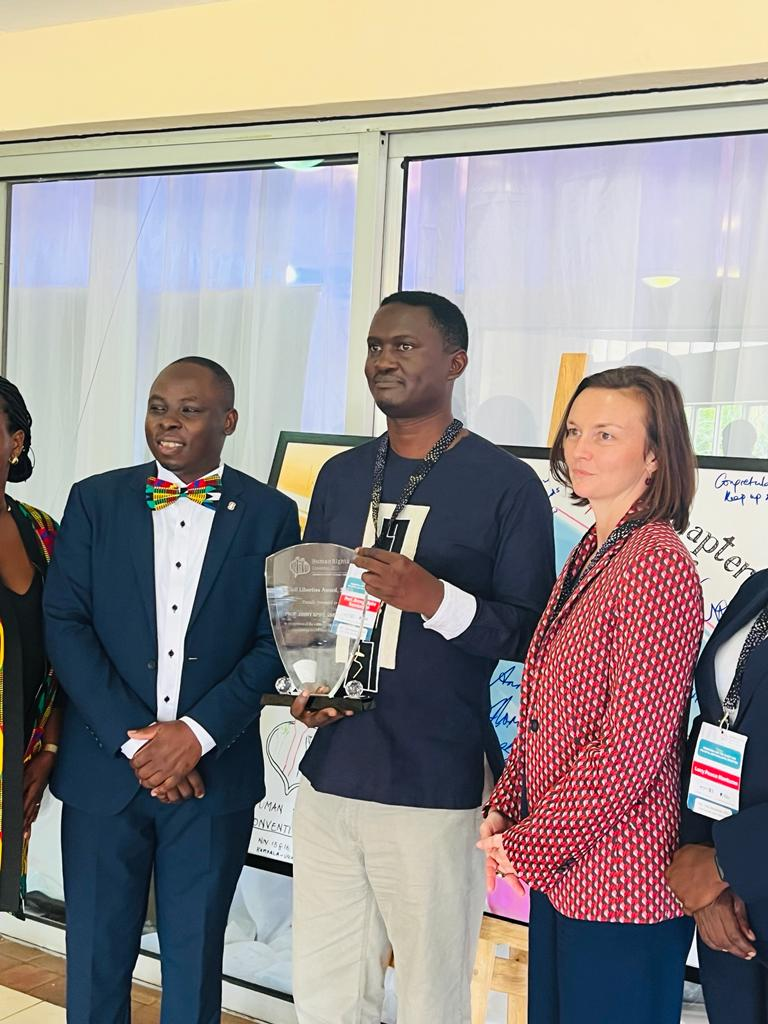
Ssentongo receiving an award during Human Rights Convention 2023

Ssentongo has been using his art to comment on Ugandan society and politics for more than two decades. He focuses on issues such as corruption, governance, and human rights.

In early 2023, he began leading social media campaigns dubbed 'exhibitions', in which he encouraged Ugandans to post their views and photos of specific issues and tag the responsible authorities. The first campaign, #KampalaPotholeExhibition, focused on the condition of roads in Kampala. Participants shared photos of potholes and gave their dimensions. As a direct result of the exhibition, President Yoweri Museveni allocated USh 6,000,000,000 for the repair of potholes.

Ssentongo's second social media campaign was the #UgandaHealthExhibition, which drew attention to poor conditions in the country's healthcare system. Across Youtube, Twitter and Reddit, the campaign received over ten million posts, and officials from the Ministry of Health responded to it publicly.

By March 2024, Ssentonga had run seven social media 'exhibitions', addressing foreign recruitment scandals, corruption within NGOs and human rights abuses, among other topics. After receiving reports of threats against him for exposing government failures, however, he began to fear for his life.

== Publications ==
=== Books ===
- Ssentongo, Jimmy Spire (May 2011). inquiry into a withering heritage. Lap Lambert Academic Publishing GmbH KG. ISBN 9783844399646.
- Ssentongo, Jimmy Spire (2012). inquiry into a withering heritage: the relevance of traditional baganda approaches to sustainable environmental conservation. Uganda Martyrs University Research Directorate. ISBN 9789970090068.
- Ssentongo, Jimmy Spire (2021). Quarantined: my ordeal in uganda's covid-19 isolation centers. Ubuntu Reading. ISBN 9789970733026.
- Ssentongo, Jimmy Spire (2021). What I Saw when I Died. Makerere University. ISBN 9789970611058.

=== Books edited ===
- Decolonization Pathways.
- Higher Education for African Challenges of the 21st Century.

== Personal life ==
Spire is married to Diana, who is a lecturer in the School of Distance and Lifelong Learning, Department of Adult and Community Education at Makerere University. The couple got married in 2012.

== See also ==
- Paul Waako
- Joseph Ssekandi
- Charles Olweny
- John Maviiri
- Adonia Katungisa
- Jesca Ruth Ataa
