= Karungi (surname) =

Karungi is a surname. Notable people with the surname include:

- Elizabeth Beikiriize Karungi (born 1976), Ugandan politician
- Jeninah Karungi, Ugandan agronomist
- Josephine Karungi, Ugandan journalist and television personality
- Naomi Karungi (1978–2020), Ugandan helicopter pilot
- Sheebah Karungi (born 1989), Ugandan musician, dancer and actress
