= Uganda Martyrs University Museum =

Planned cultural museum in Nkozi, Uganda

Coordinates: 0°00′13″N 32°00′52″E

African Research and Documentation Centre: Uganda Martyrs University.
- Established: 1966
- Location: Uganda Martyrs University campus, Nkozi, 84km along Kampala-Masaka road
- Type: Anthropological and Cultural Community Museum
- Curator: David Ngendo Tshimba

Uganda Martyrs University Museum, also known as the African Research and Documentation Centre, is an academic museum located at Uganda Martyrs University (UMU) in Nkozi, Mpigi District, Central Region, Uganda. It operates as a research and preservation unit under the Centre for African Studies at Uganda Martyrs University. It consists of collections of indigenous cultural artefacts, sculptures, and archival materials from Uganda and other parts of the African Great Lakes region. The museum serves as a teaching, research, and historical preservation facility within the university. Its collections are used for academic activities related to African studies, history, anthropology, cultural heritage, and related disciplines.

== History and development ==
The establishment of the museum in 1996 formed part of the university's efforts to promote cultural preservation, documentation, and research within the humanities and social sciences. The museum developed under the Centre for African Studies as a space for collecting, preserving, documenting, and interpreting material culture which included traditional objects, historical materials, and archival resources such as written documents, photographs, and audio-visual materials associated with research projects conducted by the university. Since its establishment, the Uganda Martyrs University Museum has supported teaching and research by giving students, academic staff, and researchers access to cultural materials for study and interpretation. It has also served as a resource for disciplines such as history, anthropology, African studies, and cultural heritage studies. In 2024, the Catholic Church in Uganda announced plans to establish a specialized museum at Uganda Martyrs University dedicated to preserving materials related to the Uganda Martyrs. It was intended to include religious relics, historical materials, scholarly resources, and artworks associated with the Uganda Martyrs.

According to Rev.Fr. Musuubire, the museum was to serve as a comprehensive center dedicated to all aspects related to the martyrs. The vice chancellor of the University prof. Patrick Edrin kyamamywa emphasized that the museum would encompass all aspects related to the martyrs including relics, scholarly materials, and artworks among others.

== Gallery ==
The museum houses collections that represent Uganda's cultural, historical, and environmental heritage. These collections are organized into ethnographic and cultural exhibits displayed within the museum building. This includes artefacts representing the material culture of Uganda's diverse communities which include traditional drums used in music and ceremonies, gourds, pottery and many others used for household storage and food preparation. Axes used in agriculture and daily subsistence activities.

== Education service ==
The UMUM supports educational activities for students, researchers, and visitors. It is used as a learning resource for academic programmes within the university, particularly in disciplines such as African studies, history, anthropology, and cultural heritage studies. The museum provides access to its collections to support experiential learning and the study of material culture. The museum facilitates research by providing opportunities for students and staff to engage with artefacts for academic inquiry and documentation. Through its collections and exhibitions, it contributes to the understanding of Uganda's cultural and historical heritage within an academic setting.

In 2024, Dr. David Ngendo Tshimba from the Centre of African Studies at the Uganda Martyrs University curated a Uganda Martyrs exhibition together with Fr. Richard Nnyombi of the Missionaries of Africa plus Prof. Derek R. Peterson from the University of Michigan

== Cultural village ==
The museum includes a cultural village component that is used to represent and interpret aspects of traditional Ugandan community life. It is designed as an educational and interpretive space that complements the indoor exhibitions by providing a contextualized view of cultural practices in a reconstructed setting. It is a prominent anthropology and community museum located at the university's main campus in Nkozi, Mpigi District, Central Region, Uganda. It illustrates selected elements of indigenous settlement patterns, domestic architecture, and daily activities as practiced by different communities in Uganda. These may include traditional dwelling forms, household organization, and spatial arrangements that reflect cultural norms and environmental adaptation.

The key features of the UMU Museum and Cultural Village include:

- Indigenous Artifacts: holds a dedicated collection of historical, cultural, and religious items that reflect the diverse heritage of Uganda's ethnic groups.
- Cultural Village and Gardens: a traditional cultural village setup. It features recreated traditional homesteads, allowing visitors to experience the architectural designs, lifestyles, and community setups of various Ugandan cultures.
- Research & Education: The center serves as a hub for anthropological research and educational outreach, preserving endangered indigenous heritage.
- Live performances and crafts: includes a craft shop and dedicated garden spaces where traditional music, dance and cultural performances are routinely hosted.

== Architecture ==
The Uganda Martyrs University Museum is integrated into the university's Nkozi campus which incorporates the natural landscape of the campus into its design. The museum's architectural layout uses the site's terrain to accommodate multiple levels while combining academic library functions with museum exhibition spaces. This integration reflects the university's approach of connecting research, education, and cultural preservation within a single facility. The Museum preserves and showcases indigenous cultural artefacts and sculptures from Uganda and the African Great Lakes region, while also supporting research, education, and community-based heritage interpretation

== See also ==
- Uganda National Cultural Centre
- Uganda Museum
