= Grace Ndeezi =

Ugandan paediatrician

Grace Ndeezi is a Ugandan female pediatrician and a professor of pediatrics and child health at Makerere University of Health Sciences with over 140 publications in peer-reviewed journals on nutrition, HIV, pneumonia, malaria, sickle cell anemia, diarrheal diseases, neonatal health and child heath interventions, such as immunization, breast feeding and other common childhood diseases. She has won many competitive research grants. She's conducted a lot of research internationally and worked in her field of study, and still currently researches actively. She has collaborated with other faculty and health professionals on three continents, including facilitation in Zimbabwe, Eritrea, and Kenya.

She has conducted a lot of research internationally, and still currently researches actively. Ndeezi and her colleagues have performed procedures on mainly pregnant women and children for cures.

== Education ==
Ndeezi earned her MBChB from Makerere University and her PhD jointly from Makerere University and the University of Bergen in Norway, where she has also taught classes.

== Career ==
Ndeezi is a professor at the School of Medicine at Makerere University's College of Health Science. She is also a team member at the Centre for Excellence in Sustainable Health, a collaborative endeavor between Makerere University and Karolinska Institutet in Sweden. She has had multiple opportunities in her lifetime to work with many international committees and collaborators from high income countries.

Ndeezi is also a health and medical sciences fellow at the Uganda National Academy of Sciences (UNAS), where she serves as treasurer and member of the UNAS Council for the 2022-2025 term.

She has also served as deputy to the Editor-in-Chief of African Health Sciences. She is also part of several committees at the College of Health and Sciences.

Ndeezi has more than 25 years of experience in pediatrics, research in her area of study, and teaching. The Joint Clinical Research Centre in Uganda is currently in charge of the Joint Clinical Research Centre.

== Select publications ==
- Nankabirwa, V., Mukunya, D., Ndeezi, G., Odongkara, B., Arach, A. & Achora, V., Mugenyi, L, Sebit, M., Wandabwa, J., Waako, P., Tylleskär, T., & Tumwine, J. (2024). Can an integrated intervention package including peer support increase the proportion of health facility births? A cluster randomised controlled trial in Northern Uganda. BMJ Open, 14(2).
- Ndeezi, G., Mor, S. M., Ascolillo, L. Rr, Tasimwa, H. B., Nakato, R., Kayondo, L. N., Tzipori, S., Mukunya, D., Griffiths, J. K., & Tumwine, J.K. Giardia duodenalis in Ugandan children aged 9–36 months in Kampala, Uganda: Prevalence and associated Factors. (2023, July). American Journal of Tropical Medicine and Hygiene, 109(1), 147-152.
- Biermann, O., Nordenstam, A., Muwonge, T., Kabiri, L., Ndeezi, G., & Alfvén, T. (2023). Sustainable preventive integrated child health care: Reflections on the importance of multidisciplinary and multisectoral stakeholder engagement. Global Health Action, 16.
- Båge, K., Bate, C., Tomasdotter, L., Mala Ali, M., Alasow, M., Ndejjo, R., Hellden, D., Ndeezi, G., Alfvén, T., & Wanyenze, R. (2022). Managing innovation for sustainable health: Rethinking training of health officials in fragile states. European Journal of Public Health, 32(3).
- Ndeezi, G., Kiyaga, C., Hernandez, A. G., Munube, D., Howard, T. A., Ssewanyana, I., ... & Aceng, J. R. (2016). Burden of sickle cell trait and disease in the Uganda Sickle Surveillance Study (US3): a cross-sectional study. The Lancet Global Health, 4(3), e195-e200.
- Ndeezi, G., Tylleskär, T., Ndugwa C. M., & Tumwine, J. K. (2012). Multiple micronutrient supplementation does not reduce diarrhoea morbidity in Ugandan HIV-infected children: a randomised controlled trial. Paediatrics and International Child Health, 32(1), 14-21.
- Ndeezi, G. (2012). Nodding Disease or syndrome: What is the way forward? African Health Sciences, 12(3), 240-241.
- Hotz, C., Loechl, C., Lubowa, A., Tumwine, J. K., Ndeezi, G., Nandutu Masawi, A., ... & Gilligan, D. O. (2012). Introduction of β-carotene–rich orange sweet potato in rural Uganda resulted in increased vitamin A intakes among children and women and improved vitamin A status among children. The Journal of Nutrition, 142(10), 1871-1880.
- Byamugisha, R., Åstrøm, A. N., Ndeezi, G., Karamagi, C. A., Tylleskär, T., & Tumwine, J. K. (2011). Male partner antenatal attendance and HIV testing in eastern Uganda: a randomized facility‐based intervention trial. Journal of the International AIDS Society, 14(1), 43-43.
- Ndeezi, G., Tylleskär, T., Ndugwa C. M., & Tumwine, J. K. (2010). Effect of multiple micronutrient supplementation on survival of HIV-infected children in Uganda: a randomized, controlled trial. Journal of the International AIDS Society, 13(1), 18-18.
- Nakawesi, J. S., Wobudeya, E., Ndeezi, G., Mworozi, E. A., & Tumwine, J. K. (2010). Prevalence and factors associated with rotavirus infection among children admitted with acute diarrhea in Uganda. BMC pediatrics, 10, 1-5.
- Mpimbaza, A., Ndeezi, G., Staedke, S., Rosenthal, P. J., & Byarugaba, J. (2008). Comparison of buccal midazolam with rectal diazepam in the treatment of prolonged seizures in Ugandan children: a randomized clinical trial. Pediatrics, 121(1), e58-e64.
- Tumwine, J. K., Kekitiinwa, A., Bakeera-Kitaka, S., Ndeezi, G., Downing, R., Feng, X., ... & Tzipori, S. (2005). Cryptosporidiosis and microsporidiosis in Ugandan children with persistent diarrhea with and without concurrent infection with the human immunodeficiency virus. The American journal of tropical medicine and hygiene, 73(5), 921-925.
