= Ndungu =

Ndungu, or Ndung'u, is a surname of Kenyan origin that may refer to:

- Njoki Susanna Ndung'u (born 1965), Kenyan lawyer and associate justice of the Supreme Court of Kenya
- Njuguna Ndung'u (born 1960), Kenyan economist and Governor of the Central Bank of Kenya
- Samuel Ndungu (born 1988), Kenyan long-distance runner based in Japan
- Thumbi Ndung'u, Kenyan medic and AIDS researcher

== See also ==
- Ndungu Land Commission, public investigation into land use in Kenya
