= Emmanuel Natal Banya =

Emmanuel Natal Banya is a Ugandan politician. He is a member of parliament representing Koboko County in Koboko District in the 12th parliament of Uganda running on the National Resistance Movement (NRM) party ticket.

Banya was born on December 26, 1976, in Angule village, Lurunu Parish, Midia Sub-County in Koboko County, Koboko district.

== Career ==
At the beginning of his career, after his university studies, he worked as Sub-County Chief of Rhino Camp and Adumi Sub-counties in the then Arua District. He served as the university secretary and accounting officer at Muni University where he was appointed in 2021 and resigned in June 2025 to pursue active elective politics. He also served as the Town Clerk for Kitgum Municipality In his career, he serves as a town clerk in Koboko, Tororo, Hoima and Soroti.He worked as the Program Manager at Community Empowerment for Rural Development (CEFORD), a local NGO in West Nile and equally served as the executive director of the organisation.

== Early life and education ==
Banya was born on December 26, 1976, in Angule village, Lurunu Parish, Midia Sub-County in Koboko County, Koboko district. He went to Anyakalio Primary School (PS) and studied up to P.6 before changing to Teremunga PS where he completed his P.7 in 1991.

Banya later joined St. Charles Lwanga College – Koboko in 1992 up to 1995 when he completed his Ordinary Level of Education. After four years in St. Charles Lwanga, Banya then joined the Comboni College in Lira for his Advanced Level of Education. He joined Uganda Martyrs University where he did Bachelors in Development Studies.

He joined Uganda Management Institute (UMI) for a Postgraduate Diploma in Urban Governance and Management and later for Masters in Business Administration and Management at Uganda Management Institute (UMI)

In 2004, Banya went to Law Development Center (LDC) and got a Certificate in Administrative Law besides many other short courses he did like Certificate in Foreign Relations attained in China, Certificate in Drip Irrigation in Israel, Certificate in Strategic Management at UMI, and Certificate in Monitoring and Evaluation also at UMI among others.
