= John F. Mugisha =

- Born: 1 March 1970 (age 56)
- Education: Keele University (BA(Hons)), (Adv.Dip.), (MSc), (PhD)
- Occupations: Health scientist, academic administrator
- Employer: Bishop Stuart University
- Predecessor: Maud Kamatenesi Mugisha
- Website: https://www.bsu.ac.ug/profile/prof-john-f-mugisha/

John F. Mugisha (born 1 March 1970) is a Ugandan scholar, researcher, health scientist, and academic administrator. He is the fourth and current Vice-Chancellor of Bishop Stuart University, a private Chartered Higher Education Institution accredited by the Uganda National Council for Higher Education, since July 2024. Before joining Bishop Stuart University, Mugisha was, until June 2024, the Vice-Chancellor of Cavendish University Uganda, which he joined in 2016 from Uganda Martyrs University, where he had served as Dean of the Faculty of Health Sciences for six years.

== Background ==
John Mugisha was born on 1 March 1970. He is married and has children.

== Career ==
- 1996 – 2000: Hospital Administrator, Itojo Hospital, Ministry of Health (Uganda)
- 2000 – 2002: Senior Hospital Administrator, Gulu Regional Referral Hospital, Ministry of Health (Uganda)
- 2002 – 2006: Lecturer, Faculty of Health Sciences, Uganda Martyrs University
- 2006 – 2010: Senior Lecturer, Faculty of Health Sciences, Uganda Martyrs University
- 2011 – 2016: Faculty Dean, Faculty of Health Sciences, Uganda Martyrs University
- 2016 – 2017: Deputy Vice-Chancellor, Cavendish University Uganda
- 2017 – 2024: Vice-Chancellor, Cavendish University Uganda

On 1 July 2014, Mugisha was appointed the fourth Vice-Chancellor of Bishop Stuart University.

== Awards ==
Mugisha received the Presidential Award – Golden Independence Medal for his contribution to health and education in Uganda, the Outstanding Alumni Award by Uganda Martyrs University at its inaugural ceremony, and the Fellowship Award by the African Institute of Public Health Professionals.

As a member of the Uganda National Council for Higher Education and Vice Chairman of the Uganda Vice Chancellors’ Forum, Mugisha has contributed to improving standards for teaching and learning, research and innovation in universities. In 2022, he was voted Vice Chair of the Inter-University Council for East Africa. He has also contributed to designing of standards for Online, Distance and e-Learning (ODeL) that assisted other universities after the shutdown of education institutions due to the COVID-19 pandemic.

== Publications ==
Mugisha has over 35 scientific publications to his name.
