= Rosemary Bareebe =

Ugandan lawyer and judge

Honorable Lady Justice Rosemary Bareebe Ngabirano

Acting Judge of the High Court of Uganda
- Appointed by: Yoweri Museveni

Personal details
- Education: Master of Laws in Human Rights and Democratisation, University of Pretoria; Master of Business Administration, Uganda Martyrs University; Bachelor of Laws, Makerere University
- Occupation: Judicial officer
- Profession: Lawyer

Rosemary Bareebe Ngabirano is a Ugandan lawyer and judge who served as the judicial officer and was appointed by President Yoweri Museveni as the acting judge of the High Court.

== Background and education ==
Ngabirano holds a Master of Laws in Human Rights and Democratisation from the University of Pretoria, an MBA from Uganda Martyrs University, and a Bachelor of Laws from Makerere University.

== Career ==
Ngabirano served as the registrar of the High Court before being appointed by President Yoweri Museveni as an acting judge of the High Court. In her role as the High Court registrar, she presided over the enrollment ceremony of 130 advocates at the Judiciary Headquarters in Kampala. She was among the thirty judicial officers who were promoted to different ranks within the judiciary, and was promoted to chief magistrate in 2014. She served as the registrar for Magistrates' Affairs and Data Management before transferring to the High Court in 2022, where she administratively coordinated all the activities at the different High Court divisions and circuits.

Ngabirano has served on the Judiciary Disciplinary Committee and the Judiciary Case Management Committee. She also served as assistant registrar, deputy registrar, chief magistrate, and magistrate grade I, in which roles she handled legal matters and promoted alternative dispute resolution. She conducted a judicial training as a tutor and external examiner at the Law Development Centre. She is a member of the Uganda Judicial Officers Association and the International Association of Women Judges. She was deployed as the deputy registrar at Lira High Court in 2018.
