= Josephine Karungi =

Ugandan journalist and television personality

- Born: Uganda
- Citizenship: Ugandan
- Education: Makerere University (Bachelor of Mass Communication)
- Occupations: Journalist, media personality
- Years active: 2009–present
- Title: Media & communications consultant at World Bank Uganda
- Spouse: Vince Musisi (m. 2012)

Josephine Karungi is a Ugandan journalist and television personality. She works as a media and communications consultant at the World Bank Uganda, based at their offices in Kampala, Uganda's capital city.

== Early life and education ==
Karungi was born in Uganda. She attended Nakasero Primary School, in Kampala. She joined St. Lawrence Citizens High school, Horizon Campus for secondary education. Later she was admitted to Makerere University, Uganda's largest and oldest public university, in Kampala, where she graduated with a Bachelor of Mass Communication degree.

== Career ==
She joined Nation Television Uganda (NTV Uganda) in 2009 as an English language news anchor. She produced and hosted the Sunday night lifestyle television talk show, Perspective With Josephine Karungi. In October 2018, she was appointed Head of News at NTV Uganda, replacing Maurice Mugisha as their new deputy managing director. She was later appointed as the communications manager with World Bank before leaving Nation Media Group.

In March 2021, she was replaced as NTV Uganda's Head of News by Faridah Nakazibwe.

== Family ==
Karungi was married to Vince Musisi, a Ugandan record producer. The couple are parents to a son.

== Other considerations ==
In January 2017, the Daily Monitor newspaper named her one of "Uganda's most likely influential people in 2017".

== Read also ==
- Jackline Kemigisa
- Esther Wamala
