= Rebecca Mulira =

Ugandan women's rights advocate

Rebecca Allen Namugenze Mukasa
- Born: Mengo Hospital, Kampala, Uganda
- Died: 2001
- Other name: Rebecca Mulira
- Notable work: Women's rights activism
- Honours: African anti-colonial struggle

Rebecca Allen Namugenze Mukasa, also known as Rebecca Mulira, was a Ugandan women's rights advocate and social activist.

== Biography ==
Mulira was born in Mengo Hospital, Kampala, Uganda. She is known for her contributions to the Buganda Kingdom. She died in a car crash in 2001.

== Honours ==
She was honoured as one of the female icons of the African anti-colonial struggle. She was hailed by the Kabaka for being a figure in women's emancipation.

== See also ==
- Women's rights in Uganda
- Sandra Kwikiriza
- Buganda
- Jesca Ruth Ataa
- Lillian Bagala
- Santa Okot
