= Dorrys Mutahunga =

Ugandan musician

- Occupations: Folk musician, songwriter, music educator, businessperson
- Spouse: Vincent Mutahunga
- Award: Artiste of the Year at the Western Music Awards (2014) PAM Award for best folk pop artiste 2007

Dorrys Mutahunga is a Ugandan folk musician, songwriter, music educator and performer from Mbarara district.

== Early life and Educational background ==
Mutahunga is a daughter of Mabanga Godfrey who was a lecturer at Bishop Stuart University and Chairman of Mbarara District Land Board. She holds a Masters Degree in Education (Educational Administration & Planning) from Mbarara University of Science and Technology (MUST). Mutahunga studied music at university, and has a postgraduate qualification in education.

== Career ==
Mutahunga is known for folk‑pop, heritage / traditional music, classical, and gospel and she has written and performed over 100 folk‑pop songs. Some of her well-known songs include Keitetsi, Mugirenta, Ninkukunda, Barbara, Kwera, Believe.

In addition, she was appointed by State House to a youth development and art project. Mutahunga started a beauty products business, operating mobile money services in Western Uganda and is also the boss of Dove Entertainment Company.

== Awards and Honors ==
Mutahunga won Western Uganda Artiste of the Year at the Western Music Awards (2014).

She was nominated for a Hipipo Award in the “Best Western Region” song category.

Mutahunga won a PAM Award for best folk pop artiste 2007.

== Personal life ==
Mutahunga is married to Vincent Mutahunga an internal auditor at Mbarara University of Science and Technology (MUST).
