= Kyamanywa =

Kyamanywa is a surname. Notable people with the surname include:

- Nathan Kyamanywa (born 1956), Ugandan Anglican bishop
- Patrick Edrin Kyamanywa (fl. from 2021), Ugandan surgeon and researcher
