= Cissy Kityo =

Ugandan physician and medical researcher

Doctor Cissy Kityo
- Born: 1962 (age 63–64); Uganda
- Citizenship: Uganda
- Education: Makerere University (MBChB, MMed); Johns Hopkins Bloomberg School of Public Health (MPH)
- Occupations: Physician, epidemiologist and researcher
- Years active: 1992–present
- Title: Executive director of the Joint Clinical Research Centre

Cissy Kityo Mutuluuza (née Cissy Kityo) is a Ugandan physician, epidemiologist and medical researcher. She is the executive director of the Joint Clinical Research Centre, a government-owned medical research institution in Uganda, specializing in HIV/AIDS treatment and management.

== Background and education ==
Kityo hails from Mpigi District, in the Central Region of Uganda. She attended local Ugandan schools for her pre-university education. She studied at Makerere University School of Medicine, first graduating with a Bachelor of Medicine and Bachelor of Surgery (MBChB) degree. She followed that up with a Master of Medicine (MMed) degree, also from Makerere University. Later, she obtained a Master of Public Health (MPH) degree from the Johns Hopkins Bloomberg School of Public Health, in Baltimore, Maryland, in the United States.

On 10 June 2025, she received an honorary Doctorate of Science from the University of Western Ontario in London, Ontario, in Canada.

== Career ==
Kityo has over 20 years experience in the field of HIV/AID diagnosis, treatment, prevention and research. Since circa 1992, she has been among the pioneers of antiretroviral therapy (ART) use in sub-Saharan Africa. She has been one of the proponents and movers of scaling up treatment in Uganda. She is part of the team that planned and wrote Uganda's first strategic plan for a national ARV policy and program to increase access to care and ARVs.

Kityo has served as researcher in many clinical, epidemiological and operational trials of HIV treatment and related infections, including tuberculosis. She has also been closely involved in the study of prevention of HIV transmission and in the preparation for HIV vaccines. She is particularly interested in clinical trials, ART implementation, evolution of HIV drug resistance, HIV reservoirs and operational research.

She has served as a member of the AIDS Task Force (ATF) in Uganda and as the chairperson of the AIDS Clinical Care Subcommittee of the ATF. Kityo has published widely in peer publications and related books on the subject.

== Other responsibilities ==
In her capacity as executive director of the JCRC, Kityo is a member of the board of directors of the institution.
