= Global Health and Vaccination Research =

Norwegian research programme

Global Health and Vaccination Research (GLOBVAC) is a programme of the Research Council of Norway. Its primary objective is to support high-quality research with potential for high impact that can contribute to sustainable improvements in health and health equity for poor people in low- and lower-middle income countries (LMIC). Norwegians institutions may apply for grants in collaboration with researchers in other countries.

As all programmes of the Research Council of Norway it is led by a programme board appointed by the Division Board for Society and Health at the Research Council. The programme board for the period 2011–2014 is chaired by Peter Smith (epidemiologist). Other members include Prof. Nelson Sewankambo and Prof. Rifat Atun

It prioritizes projects in the following thematic areas:

1. Prevention and treatment of, and diagnostics for, communicable diseases with particular relevance for low and lower-middle income countries.
2. Family planning, reproductive, maternal, neonatal, child and youth health.
3. Health systems and health policy research: that is production and application of knowledge to improve how societies organize themselves in order to achieve health goals.
4. Implementation research: research on the promotion of uptake of research findings into public health programmes, and to expand knowledge on strategies for implementation and wider scaling-up of effective health interventions and health services.
5. Innovation in technology and methods development for maternal and child health in settings where appropriate technologies are not available or non-existing.
