= Nkozi Hospital =

Private faith-based, non-profit community, hospital in Uganda

- Uganda Catholic Medical Bureau

Geography
- Location: Nkozi, Mpigi District, Central Region, Uganda
- Coordinates: 00°00′09″N 32°00′59″E

Organisation
- Type: Community
- Affiliated university: Uganda Martyrs University

Services
- Emergency department: I
- Beds: 91

History
- Founded: 1942

Links
- Website: Homepage
- Other links: Hospitals in Uganda; Medical education in Uganda

Nkozi Hospital is a hospital in Nkozi, Mpigi District, in the Central Region of Uganda. It is a private, non-profit, community hospital, serving the town of Nkozi and surrounding areas of southern Mawokota County. The hospital also serves as the nearest and hospital of first choice for the staff and students of Uganda Martyrs University, located in the same town.

== Location ==
The hospital is located in the parliamentary constituency of Mawokota County South, off of the Kampala–Masaka Road. This location is approximately 55 kilometres (34 mi), by road, northeast of Masaka Regional Referral Hospital, in the city of Masaka. Nkozi Hospital is approximately 83 kilometres (52 mi), by road, southwest of Mulago National Referral Hospital, in the city of Kampala, Uganda's capital.

The hospital is about 48 kilometres (30 mi), by road, southwest of the town of Mpigi, where the district headquarters are located. The geographical coordinates of Nkozi Hospital are: 0°00'09.0"N, 32°00'59.0"E (Latitude=0.002490, Longitude=32.016381).

== Overview ==
During the Uganda-Tanzania War, which toppled Idi Amin, the hospital received extensive damage to buildings and equipment. The X-ray unit damaged during that war was replaced in 2007 through a donation from the Government of Japan.

The hospital is owned by the Roman Catholic Archdiocese of Kampala. It is accredited to the Uganda Catholic Medical Bureau and is managed by the Sisters of Immaculate Heart of Mary Reparatrix. The hospital, as of December 2004, was staffed by three doctors who performed surgeries, clinical assistants, and had an overall staff of 107 including midwives, nurses, nursing assistants, and other support staff. In addition, the hospital serves as the teaching hospital for students pursuing the Master of Science in Health Services Management degree at Uganda Martyrs University, also in Nkozi.

Nkozi Hospital generates 90 percent of its income locally, with patient user-fees accounting for an average of 51.4 percent of total hospital income. As of December 2019, the hospital averaged 30,998 annual outpatient visits, 5,885 annual inpatient admissions and 1,800 annual maternal deliveries. Its annual bed occupancy ratio averaged 57 percent, and its annual caesarian rate averaged 22.2 percent.

== See also ==
- List of hospitals in Uganda
- Uganda Martyrs University
