= Joseph Ssekandi =

- Born: 1970 (age 55–56); Nkozi, Uganda
- Citizenship: Uganda
- Education: Uganda Martyrs University (Bachelor of Arts in Development Studies) (Postgraduate Diploma in Teaching and Learning); University of Reading (Master of Science in Environment and Development); University of Nairobi (Doctor of Philosophy in Dry Lands Resource Management)
- Occupations: Academic & academic administrator
- Years active: 1990–present
- Title: Dean of the Faculty of Agriculture at Uganda Martyrs University

Joseph Ssekandi is a Ugandan academic and academic administrator, who serves as the dean of the Faculty of Agriculture at Uganda Martyrs University, a private university affiliated with the Roman Catholic Church in Uganda.

== Background and education ==
Ssekandi was born in Nkozi Village, Mpigi District, in the Buganda Region of Uganda in the 1970s. He attended Saint Mugagga Nkozi Primary School, before transferring to Saint Balikudembe Secondary School in Mpigi District, where he completed his O-Level and A-Level education.

Later, he was admitted to Uganda Martyrs University (UMU), graduating with a Bachelor of Arts degree in Development Studies. He followed that with a Postgraduate Diploma in Learning and Teaching, also from UMU.

He holds a Master of Science degree in Environment and Development from the University of Reading in Berkshire, United Kingdom. His Doctor of Philosophy in Dry Land Resources Management was awarded by the University of Nairobi in 2017.

== Career ==
After completing his A-Level studies, Ssekandi's father, Matia Nyakamwe, ran out of tuition money to send his son to university. Ssekandi took up a job as a security guard at UMU, working in that capacity for three years. An employee of the university, Evelyn Ayot, noticed his demeanor and good English language, and encouraged him to apply to UMU. He was admitted and obtained a £2,000 annual scholarship from Dorothy Whitworth, a British citizen. During the transitional first semester, he continued to work as a security guard at night, while attending class during the day.

After his master's degree in the United Kingdom, he secured a job on a horse farm, in the UK. However, when he came to visit relatives in Uganda in 2009, UMU offered him a job as the administrator of the UMU School of Diplomacy, so he stayed.

After his PhD studies, Uganda Martyrs University appointed Ssekandi as dean of the Faculty of Agriculture, where he still serves, as of October 2018.

== Family ==
Ssekandi is a married father of four children.
