= Franc Kamugyisha =

Ugandan social entrepreneur (born 1993)

- Born: 19 March 1993 (age 33); Fort Portal, Uganda
- Education: Università Cattolica del Sacro Cuore; Uganda Martyrs University
- Occupation: Social entrepreneur
- Known for: Climatetech startups
- Title: Co-founder at Ecoplastile

Franc Kamugyisha (born 19 March 1993), is a Ugandan social entrepreneur. He is the founder of Ecoplastile, a climatetech company that converts plastic waste into sustainable building materials. He is also the founder of WastePays in Uganda, an initiative focused on incentivized recycling systems. Kamugyisha is known for his work in waste management and circular economy solutions in Uganda, and was named the Commonwealth Young Person of the Year 2022.

== Early life and education ==
Kamugyisha was born on 19 March 1993 in Nyabweya village in Fort Portal and raised in Kampala, Uganda. He began his entrepreneurial journey at a young age. Kamugyisha has a Bachelor of Business Administration in Accounting and Finance, and a National Certificate in Building and Construction. Since 2024, he also holds an E4IMPACT MBA in Impact Entrepreneurship from Università Cattolica del Sacro Cuore in Italy and an MBA in Entrepreneurship from Uganda Martyrs University.

== Early career ==
Kamugyisha worked as Director of Finance at ISDNET Uganda, a non-profit organization focused on training student leaders and addressing violence in schools. He also served as the Estates Manager at Ibanda University in Western Uganda where he was in charge of construction projects for five years.

== Ecoplastile ==
Kamugyisha founded Ecoplastile in 2020 to address plastic waste and housing challenges in Uganda. Ecoplastile collects and processes waste plastics into durable Ecopoles, plastic lumbers and Ecofloor tiles. The idea of Ecoplastile was shaped by Kamugyisha's early experiences with waste disposal and his background in construction at Ibanda University. Ecoplastile also developed Wasteinsure, a program and mobile app that enables users to exchange recyclable plastic for financial value while supporting informal waste collectors. Ecoplastile is based in Namanve Industrial Area and has received support from JICA and UNDP Uganda and other organizations like Uganda Research Institute.

Through Ecoplastile, Kamugyisha founded WastePays, a waste management initiative focused on incentivized recycling systems. In 2024, WastePays entered into a partnership with Crown Beverages Limited, a bottler of Pepsi products in Uganda, to improve the collection and recycling of polyethylene terephthalate PET waste in Jinja City.

Kamugyisha and Ecoplastile participated in an initiative of AB InBev named 100+ Accelerator program, launched in 2018 to support sustainability-focused startups. In 2023, Ecoplastile was a runner-up in Cohort 4 of the program in Uganda.

== Recognitions ==
- 2022: Finalist for Commonwealth Youth Awards 2022.
- 2022: Commonwealth Young person of the Year Award.
