= Thumbi Ndung'u =

Kenyan HIV/AIDS researcher

Thumbi Ndung'u is a Kenyan HIV/AIDS researcher. He is the Director for Basic and Translational Science and a Max Planck Research Group Leader at the Africa Health Research Institute (AHRI) in KwaZulu-Natal, South Africa. He is Professor of Infectious Diseases in the Division of Immunity and Infection, University College London. He is Professor and Victor Daitz Chair in HIV/TB Research and Scientific Director of the HIV Pathogenesis Programme (HPP) at the Nelson R. Mandela School of Medicine, University of KwaZulu-Natal. He holds the South African Research Chair in Systems Biology of HIV/AIDS. He is an adjunct professor of Immunology and Infectious Diseases at the Harvard T.H. Chan School of Public Health. He is the Programme Director of the Sub-Saharan African Network for TB/HIV Research Excellence (SANTHE), a research and capacity building initiative led by Africa Health Research Institute, and funded by the African Academy of Sciences and the Wellcome Trust.

Ndung'u attended Gathugu Primary School in Kiambu, Kenya and Nyeri High School, Nyeri, Kenya. He graduated with a Bachelor of Veterinary Medicine degree from the University of Nairobi, Kenya, and obtained a PhD in Biological Sciences in Public Health from Harvard University, United States. As a graduate student, he worked with Max Essex at Harvard. He was also a Postdoctoral Fellow in Virology at Harvard Medical School. He is a member of the Academy of Science of South Africa (ASSAf) and a fellow of the African Academy of Sciences (AAS). He has been a member of the External Advisory Board of the HIV Vaccine Trials Network (HVTN), a member of the Scientific Advisory Committee of the Cape Town HVTN Immunology Laboratory (CHIL), a member of the Scientific Advisory Panel of the Poliomyelitis Research Foundation and a member of the advisory board of the Global Health and Vaccination Research Programme (GLOBVAC), The Research Council of Norway. He was co-chair of the Young and Early Career Investigators Committee (YECIC) of the Global HIV Vaccine Enterprise from 2008 to 2010 that worked on the Enterprise's five-year strategic plan.

Ndung'u was the first scientist to clone infectious HIV subtype C and has received numerous awards for his scientific and scholarly contributions. The awards include:

- Jun 2001 - Edgar Haber Award (Harvard University) in recognition of "outstanding, original and creative thesis work that makes a fundamental contribution to our understanding of a biological problem important to public health."
- Feb 2007 - Vice-Chancellor's Research Award, University of KwaZulu-Natal in recognition of "exceptional research and research related scholarly activities."
- Jan 2012 - Howard Hughes Medical Institute's International Early Career Scientist Award.
- Oct 2017 - South African Medical Research Council Gold Scientific Achievement Award. Gold medals are awarded to established senior scientists who have made seminal scientific contributions that have impacted on the health of people.
- Nov 2018 - Research Excellence Award at the South African Health Excellence Awards. The award ceremony celebrated excellence in healthcare by identifying leaders in medicine who have contributed to research, teaching and advancement of medicine in South Africa.

His research interests are host-pathogen interactions, particularly immune mechanisms of HIV and TB control. He has co-authored more than 200 manuscripts in peer-reviewed journals. He has made seminal contributions on our understanding of how virus-host interactions lead to immune-mediated mechanisms of HIV control, which has implications for immune-based prophylactic and therapeutic strategies against the virus. He has received grant funding from the South African National Research Foundation, the South African Medical Research Council, the Bill and Melinda Gates Foundation, the National Institutes of Health, the Howard Hughes Medical Institute, the European Union, the African Academy of Sciences and the Wellcome Trust among others. He is leading a multidisciplinary team of researchers working in the fields of HIV and TB immunopathogenesis, vaccine development and immune-based HIV functional cure strategies. He has special interest in capacity building for biomedical research in Africa.

== See also ==
- HIV/AIDS in Africa
- HIV/AIDS in South Africa
