= Maud Kamatenesi Mugisha =

Ugandan natural scientist and academic administrator

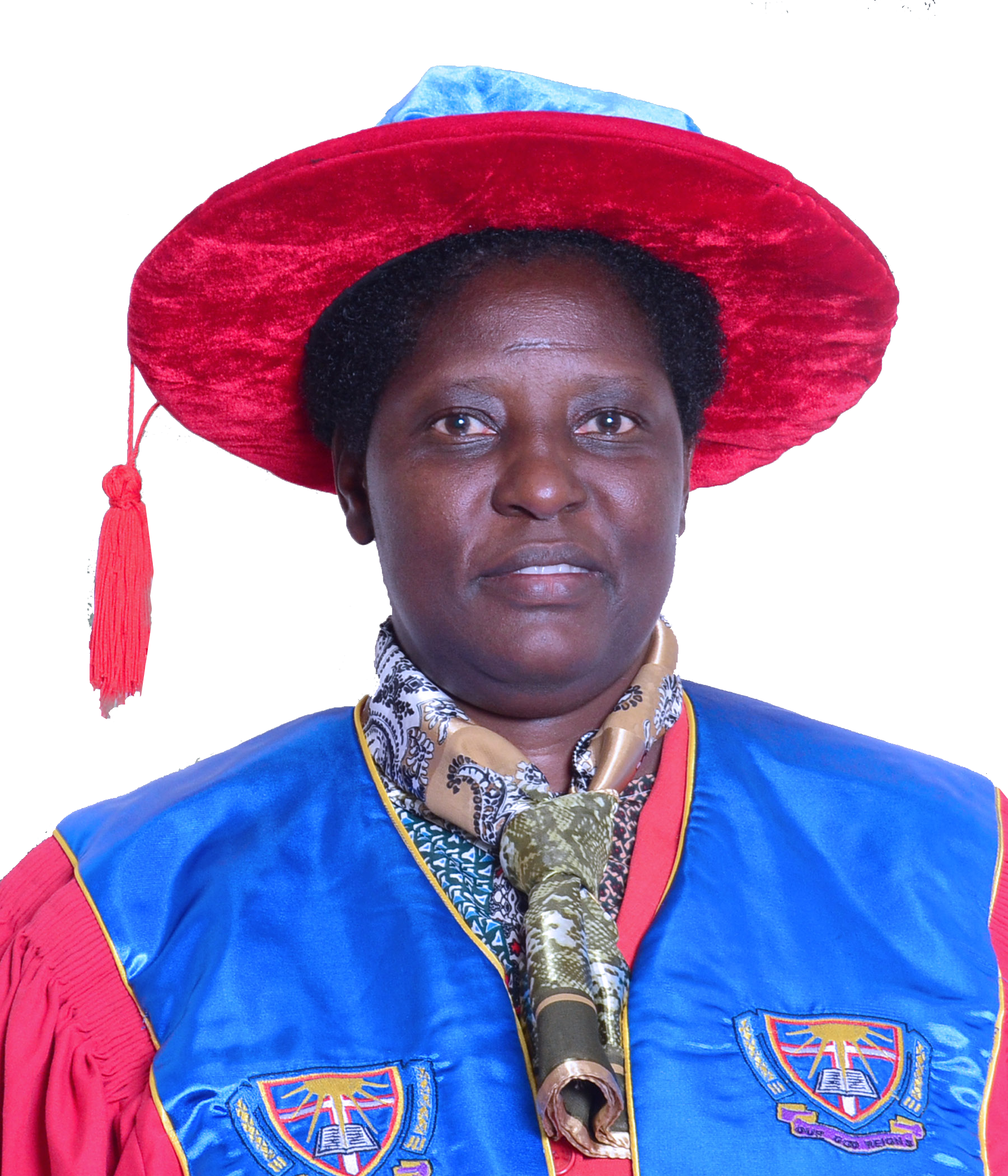
- Born: 5 May 1970 (age 56); Kitagata, Uganda
- Education: Makerere University (BSc), (Dip.Ed), (MSc), (PhD)
- Occupations: Natural scientist, academic administrator
- Years active: 1994–present
- Spouse: Balaam Mugisha
- Children: 4
- Website: maudkamatenesi.com

Maud Kamatenesi Mugisha (born 5 May 1970) is an Ugandan natural scientist and academic administrator. She is the former vice chancellor of Bishop Stuart University (1 May 2014 – 23 February 2023), a private chartered higher education institution in Uganda, accredited by the Uganda National Council for Higher Education. Since 1 March 2023, she has been serving as the chairperson of the University Council at Kampala International University.

== Background ==
She was born in Kitagata, Sheema District, Western Uganda, in 1970.

== Education ==
She attended Kasanna Primary School. She later attended Nganwa High School for her O-Level education, between 1984 and 1988. In 1985, she joined Maryhill High School, in Mbarara, for her A-Level studies. In 1993, she was admitted to Makerere University, Uganda's largest and oldest public university. She studied Botany and Zoology, graduating with a Bachelor of Science degree. She studied for the postgraduate Diploma in Education, also from Makerere.

Her Master of Science in Environment and Natural Resources Management degree and her Ph.D in Medical Ethnobotany and Bioprospecting, were both obtained from Makerere University.

== Scientific career ==
Soon after writing her final examinations in botany and zoology at Makerere in 1996, Mugisha was recruited as a teaching assistant in the Faculty of Science at the same institution. From 1998 until 2000, she served as lecturer and head of department at Uganda Fisheries Training Institute in Entebbe. She later served as the head of fisheries extension education and administration, Fisheries Training Institute, Entebbe. From 2010 until 2011, she served as the deputy dean, research and graduate studies, in the Faculty of Science, Makerere University. From February 2011 until May 2014, she served as the dean of the School of Biosciences, College of Natural Sciences at Makerere University.

In 2007, Mugisha reported that a bioprospecting team she led had discovered 28 herbs of significant medicinal value in Mabira Forest and other forested areas in Uganda. She reported that there was ongoing work in Uganda to domesticate plants traditionally used in medicines and discussed the difficulty in obtaining knowledge of medicinal plants from traditional healers.

Throughout her career, Mugisha has advocated for increased government funding for technology transfer from university research to commercial offerings. When Makerere University established formal protections for the intellectual property of lecturers and students in 2010, Mugisha, then deputy dean in the faculty of science, commented that she had concealed the results of her research in the past and was optimistic that the new unit would encourage more open information sharing.

Mugisha is a fellow of the Uganda National Academy of Sciences and served on its leadership council from 2022-2025.

== University career ==
On 2 May 2014, Mugisha was appointed vice chancellor of Bishop Stuart University In 2017, she responded to complaints made by Kale Kayihura over student protests concerning the removal of the upper age limit of 75 from holding the office of President of Uganda. She stated that Bishop Stuart University was founded on religion, not politics, and that students protesting during school time would be punished.

In 2020, Mugisha spoke out about the unpreparedness of Ugandan higher education facilities for events like COVID-19, stating that weakness in information technology infrastructure and staff preparation had affected the education of more than 15 million students. A year later, she said that digital and blended learning had taken hold in the country's higher education programs and advocated for a more reliable electricity supply to increase digital participation in rural areas. In 2025, Mugisha again pushed for increased staff preparation, this time in the area of competency-based learning as laid out by then-minister for education, Janet Museveni.

== Selected publications ==
- Mugisha, M. K., Asiimwe, S., Namutebi, A., Borg-Karlson, A.-K., & Kakudidi, E. K. (2014). Ethnobotanical study of indigenous knowledge on medicinal and nutritious plants used to manage opportunistic infections associated with HIV/AIDS in western Uganda. Journal of Ethnopharmacology, 155(1), 194–202. https://doi.org/10.1016/j.jep.2014.05.012

== See also ==
- List of university leaders in Uganda
