= Jeninah Karungi =

Ugandan agronomist

- Occupation: Agronomist
- Awards: Fellow of the Uganda National Academy of Sciences (2014)

Academic background
- Education: Makerere University; Wye College; Swedish University of Agricultural Sciences

Academic work
- Discipline: Agronomy
- Sub-discipline: Agricultural entomology; integrated pest management
- Institutions: Makerere University

Jeninah Karungi-Tumutegyereize is an Ugandan agronomist who specialises in agricultural entomology and integrated pest management. She is an associate professor at Makerere University and is a Fellow of the Uganda National Academy of Sciences.

== Biography ==
Jeninah Karungi-Tumutegyereize spent a year at an external programme in Wye College (1997-1998) doing her certificate in agronomy, and she received her BSc in agriculture in 1997 and her MSc in crop science in 1999 at Makerere University, before receiving her PhD in agriculture in 2007 as part of a joint programme with Makerere and the Swedish University of Agricultural Sciences. Afterwards, she began teaching at the Makerere University School of Agricultural Sciences' Crop Science Unit as a Lecturer from 2007 until her promotion to associate professor in 2014, moving to the College of Agricultural and Environmental Sciences. She made her 2012 TWAS-DFG Cooperation Visit at the University of Giessen.

As an academic, she specialises in agricultural entomology and integrated pest management. She won the 2009 International Integrated Pest Management Excellence Award.

She was a TWAS Sub-Saharan Africa Regional Partner Young Affiliate Alumnus from 2010 until 2014. She was elected Fellow of the Uganda National Academy of Sciences in 2014. She is a full member of the Organization for Women in Science for the Developing World, and she was a founding member of the Uganda National Young Academy.

Karungi and her spouse have four children.

== See also ==
- National Agricultural Research Organisation
