= Christine Dranzoa =

Ugandan scientist, academic, and academic administrator (1967–2022)

- Born: 1 January 1967; Adua, Moyo District, Uganda
- Died: 28 June 2022 (aged 55); Mulago Hospital, Kampala, Uganda
- Citizenship: Uganda
- Education: Makerere University (BSc in Zoology) (MSc in Zoology) (PhD in Biology)
- Occupations: University Professor, Academic Administrator and Scientist
- Years active: 1992–2022
- Known for: Scientific knowledge, Administrative skills, Honesty
- Title: Vice Chancellor; Muni University

Christine Dranzoa (1 January 1967 – 28 June 2022) was a Ugandan university professor, academic administrator, biologist, terrestrial ecologist and community leader. She was, at the time of her death, the Vice Chancellor of Muni University, one of the public universities in Uganda.

== Background and education ==
She was born in 1967, in what was known as Moyo District at the time. Today, her home district is known as Adjumani District. Christine Dranzoa held the degree of Bachelor of Science (BSc) in Zoology, obtained in 1987, from Makerere University, the oldest university in East Africa. She also held the degree of Master of Science (MSc), in Zoology, obtained in 1991, also from Makerere University. Her degree of Doctor of Philosophy (PhD) in Biology was obtained from the same university in 1997. She also held about half a dozen certificates in management, conservation, and project planning from Ugandan and International institutions.

== Work experience ==
In 1992 Christine Dranzoa joined Makerere University as a Lecturer in the Faculty of Veterinary Medicine Department of Wildlife and Animal Resources Management, she served as the pioneer head of the Wildlife and Animal Resources Department from 1992 until 2005, at the Faculty of Veterinary Medicine, a department she had co-founded with her colleagues.

In 2005, she joined the university administration at Makerere university appointed as Deputy Director of the School of Postgraduate Studies at the university, serving in that capacity from 2005 until 2010. In 2010, Dr. Dranzoa was appointed to lead a three-person task-force to prepare for the creation of Muni University, the sixth public university in Uganda. In January 2012, when the university became operational, Professor Dranzoa became the founding Vice Chancellor of the institution.

== Other responsibilities ==
Dr. Dranzoa served as the Honorary Secretary of the Forum for African Women Educationalists (FAWE), a pan-African Non-Governmental Organisation (NGO), founded in 1992, that is active in 32 African countries. FAWE aims to empower girls and women through gender-responsive education. Its members include human rights activists, gender specialists, researchers, education policy-makers, university vice-chancellors and ministers of education. The organisation maintains its headquarters in Nairobi, Kenya, and has regional offices in Dakar, Senegal.

In 2006, she co-founded Nile Women Initiative, a non-profit, Non-government organization, which aims to address the gender disparities affecting women in the West Nile sub-region of Uganda. She served as the Chairperson of the NGO.

Professor Dranzoa published widely in professional journals and has written chapters in scientific books pertaining to her fields of specialization. Her publications are detailed in her professional resume.

== Death ==
On 28 June 2022, Christine Dranzoa died at 3.30 am, at Mulago National Referral Hospital, in Kampala. She was 55 years old.

== See also ==
- Ugandan university leaders
