= Esther Wamala =

Ugandan science and health journalist

- Born: Uganda
- Education: Bachelor of Development Studies, Makerere University; Executive master's in Media Leadership and Innovation, Aga Khan University
- Occupations: Journalist; Chief news editor, CBS 89.2 FM; Senior science journalist
- Employer: Central Broadcasting Service (CBS) FM
- Known for: Health science journalism; Reporting on HIV/AIDS and human rights issues; Mentorship and training of female journalists
- Notable work: Joining Hands (video documentary); Articles published on AllAfrica.com, OVCsupport.net, Health News Nigeria
- Awards: WAN-IFRA Women in News Leadership Programme (2019); UMWA Journalism Training and Mentorship Award (2023)

Esther Wamala is a Ugandan media practitioner and chief news editor for CBS radio. She is also a senior science journalist and a news writer. She specialises in health science journalism where she has published a lot of articles. She is part of humanitarian organisations which focus on reporting health and human rights stories that affect marginalised groups affected by HIV/AIDS.

== Background and education ==
Wamala earned a bachelors degree in Development studies from Makerere University. She then earned an executive master's degree in Media Leadership and Innovation from Aga Khan University.

== Career ==
Wamala specializes in science journalism with a focus in health sciences. She is currently employed by Central Broadcasting Service Limited as a chief news editor for CBS 89.2 FM Emmanduso. During her career as a practicing journalist, Wamala's news stories have been published by various international media and websites including OVC support.net, AllAfrica.com, and Health News Nigeria.

In 2007, she was a participant in the Fredkorpset (FK) Professional Exchange, where she was attached to the Ethiopian Media Women Association (EMWA) and was a local producer for a video documentary titled Joining Hands about violence towards children and women in Ethiopia. The film was produced by Sound Development Media Communication, a Canadian media firm.

Wamala was a 2019 cohort winner under the WAN-IFRA Coaching, Mentorship and Networking Programme for female journalists.

Wamala is a member of the Key Correspondents network, which focuses on marginalised groups affected by HIV, to report the health and human rights stories that matter to them. She is also among the female journalists recognised for the 2016 elections. In 2023, Wamala received an award from UMWA (Uganda Media Women's Association) for her role in training, mentor and coaching ten journalists within media outlets under the buganda kingdom.
