= Ndungu Land Commission =

Kenyan government commission

The Commission of Inquiry into the Illegal/Irregular Allocation of Public Land, which came to be known as the "Ndungu Commission" after the name of its Chair, Paul Ndungu, was a Kenya Government Commission established in 2003. The Commission was formulated to inquire into the extra-legal allocation of public lands and lands reserved for public purpose to private individuals and corporate entities, and to provide recommendations to the Government for the restoration of those lands to their original purpose or other appropriate solutions.

== Membership ==
The Commission as appointed by President Mwai Kibaki had representatives from civil society, academia, the legal profession, and civil service:

1. Paul Ndiritu Ndungu - (Chairman)
2. Michael Aronson - (Vice-chairman)
3. Ahmed Ahmed Abdallah
4. Davinder Lamba
5. Ann Kirima
6. Ishan Kapila
7. Odenda Lumumba
8. Winston O. Ayoki
9. Nancy Mukunya
10. Peter Koech
11. John Githongo - Permanent Secretary, Office of the President, responsible for Governance & Ethics
12. Kiriinya Mukiira - Permanent Secretary, Ministry of Lands and Settlement
13. Rachel Arungah - Permanent Secretary, Ministry of Environment, Natural Resources and Wildlife
14. Erastus Kabutu Mwongera - Permanent Secretary, Ministry of Roads, Public Works and Housing
15. Zachary Onyancha Ogongo - Permanent Secretary, Ministry of Local Government
16. Lawrence Agayi Orowe - Designated representative of the Permanent Secretary, Office of the President, responsible for Governance & Ethics
17. Nelson Waruinge Kimani - Designated representative of the Permanent Secretary, Ministry of Lands and Settlement
18. David K. Mbugua - Designated representative of the Permanent Secretary, Ministry of Environment, Natural Resources and Wildlife
19. Musa Kibiti Rintari - Designated representative of the Permanent Secretary, Ministry of Roads, Public Works and Housing
20. Muli Nyamai Malombe - Designated representative of the Permanent Secretary, Ministry of Local Government

The following served as Joint Secretaries:

1. Victoria Kattambo
2. Smokin Wanjala

The Counsel to the Commission was:

1. Wanyiri Kihoro

== Summary of findings ==
Upon detailed review of land-related laws in Kenya, official reports concerning the land issue by government and non-government bodies, documents and records submitted by ministries and public bodies, and reports and memoranda by professional associations and members of the public, the Commission categorised its findings according to three broad types of public land:

I. Urban, State & Ministries’ Land

The Commission indicated that numerous methods were used to grab land falling under this category.

- Widespread abuse of presidential discretion with regard to unalienated urban land, with ‘in many instances’ (both) Presidents Jomo Kenyatta and Daniel arap Moi making grants to land to individuals without any consideration to the public interest, for political reasons, and without proper pursuit of legal procedures, whilst there was also extensive illegal allocation by both former presidents of alienated land (viz, land which they did not have legal power to allocate).
- Various Commissioners of Lands had made direct grants of government land without any authority from the President. Forged letters and documents were used to allocate land in numerous instances, with many records at the Ministry of Lands and Settlements having been deliberately destroyed. Often, land was sold by grantees without any adherence to the conditions laid down by letters of allotment, and many illegal titles to public land were transferred to third parties, often State Corporations, for massive sums of money.
- Land compulsorily acquired, like that for the proposed Nairobi by-pass, was illegally allocated to individuals and companies, and then often sold on to third parties, whilst land reserved for public purposes such as schools, playgrounds, and hospitals etc. had been sold off in blatant disregard of the law by both the Commissioner of Lands and numerous local authorities.

In summary, the Commission found that the powers vested in the President had been grossly abused by both former Presidents and successive Commissioners of Lands and their deputies over the years, under both previous regimes; there had been ‘unbridled plunder’ (Commission: p. 81) of public land by local Councillors and officials; illegal transactions were hugely facilitated by the extensive complicity of professionals (lawyers, surveyors, valuers, physical planners, engineers, architects, land registrars, estate agents and bankers) in the land and property market; and most high profile allocations of public land were made to companies incorporated specifically for that purpose, largely to shield the directors and shareholders of such entities from easy public view. Finally, and the Commission found that ‘most illegal allocations of public land took place before or soon after the multiparty general elections of 1992, 1997 and 2002’, reinforcing its view that public land was allocated ‘as political reward or patronage’ (p. 83).

II. Settlement Schemes & Trust Lands

- Trust land, including settlement scheme land purchased by government with international loans from European settlers for settlement by African smallholders or carved out of Trust land, has been similarly abused. The Commission found that, overall, whilst the establishment of settlement schemes and their subsequent allocation in the early years of independence generally conformed to the original objectives, in latter years there was extensive deviation, with much land having been allocated for purposes other than settlement and agricultural production.
- Allocation of plots, formally conducted under Settlement Fund Trustees, devolves in practice upon District Plot Allocation Committees composed of the District Commissioner, District Settlement Officer, District Agricultural Officer, the area MP, the Chairman of the relevant County Council and the Clerk to Council. Settlement Fund Trustees appear to lack any supervisory powers over these committees, with the result that the local committees have been almost wholly unaccountable. The result has been predictable, with the interests of the landless having been ignored in favour of those of ‘District officials, their relatives, Members of Parliament, Councillors and prominent politicians from the area, Ministry of Lands and Settlement officials, other civil servants and … so called ‘politically correct’ individuals’ (p. 127). And whilst the majority of deserving allottees received smaller plots, the undeserving often received large ones. Meanwhile, farms belonging to the Agricultural Development Corporation, designed to provide the needs of the agricultural industry by developing high quality seeds or livestock or undertaking research etc., have been illegally established as settlement schemes and subsequently illegally allocated to individuals and companies, often as political reward or patronage (Commission: pp. 134–5).
- Extensive tracts of Trust Land have been illegally allocated, with County Councillors having been the main beneficiaries. Whilst the Commission was able to provide some glaring examples of such abuse, it was hampered in its work by the failure or refusal of councils to submit relevant information (p. 140). It concludes:

Instead of playing their role as custodians of public resources including land, county and municipal councils have posed the greatest danger to these resources … the most pronounced land grabbers in these areas were the Councillors them-selves…The corruption within central government has been replicated at the local level through the activities and omissions of county and municipal councillors (Commission: p.147).

III. Forestlands, National Parks, Game Reserves, Wetlands, Riparian Reserves & Protected Areas

- Only 1.7% of the 3% of the country which was covered by gazetted forests at independence remained, most of the reduction having come about as a result of illegal and irregular excisions, usually made without any reference to scientific considerations or under the guise of settlement schemes. The beneficiaries of such excisions include schools (often private), government institutions, and religious bodies as well as private individuals and companies.
- Land around riparian sites have been illegally allocated by the Kenya Wildlife Service, with many of the allocations – such as those made since 1995 to some 14 beneficiaries around Lake Naivasha – being known to have severely affected the ecosystem. Fortunately, the Commission finds that the National Parks and Reserves have been more effectively protected, yet nonetheless it provides some ten cases of illegal allocations within KWS protected areas, and 15 cases in KWS alienated plots beside them.
- The Commission recorded 26 instances of illegal allocations of land from Nature Reserves falling under the domain of local authorities, whilst there are some 8 known cases of land set aside for national museums and monuments having been illegally allocated to private individuals. The latter include the allocation of Kongo Mosque site at Kwale to former President Moi in 1986. It comes as no surprise that land belonging to the military, and even land portions belonging to State Houses and lodges, have also been sold off.

Through this catalog of corruption, the Commission concluded that there was systematic and widespread abuse of public trust by public officials, to the extent that many officials failed to see anything morally wrong with their allocating land illegally. T*here were many centers of power which were responsible for the illegal allocation of land, yet the Commission makes it clear that the lead in public plunder has consistently been given from the top. Kenya, it concludes, has fallen into a state of ‘moral decadence’, this epitomized no more clearly than by the extensive participation in land grabbing by churches, mosques, temples and other faith institutions, these including such venerable institutions as the Catholic Archdiocese of Nairobi, the Church Commission of Kenya, and the Anglican Church.

== Summary of recommendations ==
The Commission made a series of recommendations for each of the three main categories as outlined above in the Summary of Findings, as well as a number of recommendation which apply to across the board.

- All allocations of public utility land are illegal and should be nullified, and such lands should be repossessed and restored to the purpose for which they were intended;
- Where land has been reserved for a public purpose, no consent to an application for change of user with respect to that land shall be granted unless the proposed change of user is in the public interest;
- All public officials/persons/professionals who facilitated in or participated in the illegal allocation of public land should be investigated and prosecuted in accordance with the applicable penal law;
- All lands reserved for the use or purposes of a Ministry, Department or any other government institutions which have since been illegally allocated to individuals or companies should be repossessed and restored to their original purpose, and titles acquired pursuant to the illegal allocations should be revoked;
- All land allocations in settlement schemes which were made to people who were at the time public officers, Members of Parliament, area Councillors, political operatives, and other undeserving people, at the expense of the landless and contrary to established policy and procedures, should be revoked;
- The Government should prepare a policy setting out the objectives and guidelines for the establishment, allocation and management of settlement schemes in the country;
- All allocations of Trust Lands to individuals and companies contrary to the provisions of the Constitution, Trust Land Act and the Land Adjudication Act should be revoked;
- The entire management structure of Trust Land should be re-examined and reformed;
- All excisions of forestland which were made contrary to the provisions of the Forest Act and the Government Lands Act should be cancelled, and any titles revoked; the affected forestlands should be repossessed and restored to their original purpose;
- All Gazetted forest boundaries should be resurveyed for validation and rectification;
- All allocations of land within and around riparian areas and other wetlands should be cancelled and titles thereto revoked without exception;
- The Government should undertake the survey and protection of riparian sites and other wetlands, and consequently stop the current human activity encroaching the following areas: Lake Naivasha, Lake Olbollosat, Lake Victoria, Lake Elementaita, Omo Delta on Lake Turkana, the Tana River Delta, and Indian Ocean coastline 100 feet inland from the high water mark.
- Establishment of a Land Titles Tribunal to embark upon the process of revocation and rectification of titles in the country;
- Computerization of Land Records which should be made available to the public for inspection;
- Insurance of Land Titles to eliminate risk and uncertainty of dealing with forged titles;
- Establishment of a Land Commission vested with powers of allocating public land and supervising the management and allocation of Trust Land, while revoking the powers of the President and Commissioner of Lands;
- Inventory of Public Land, since there is no complete record or register of public land in the country;
- Harmonization of Land Legislation - at present there are more than 40 different statutes dealing with aspects of land administration, ownership and use;
- Upgrading Informal Settlements in urban centres by establishing decent and affordable housing schemes;
- Establishment of a Land Division of the High Court which would exclusively deal with land cases.

== Cost ==
In response to a query by Joseph Lekuton, on 16 December 2008, Orwa Ojode the Assistant Minister for Provincial Administration and Internal Security confirmed to Parliament that the Commission had cost the Kenya Government Ksh 77,812,169.
