= Elizabeth Beikiriize Karungi =

Ugandan politician and Business Woman

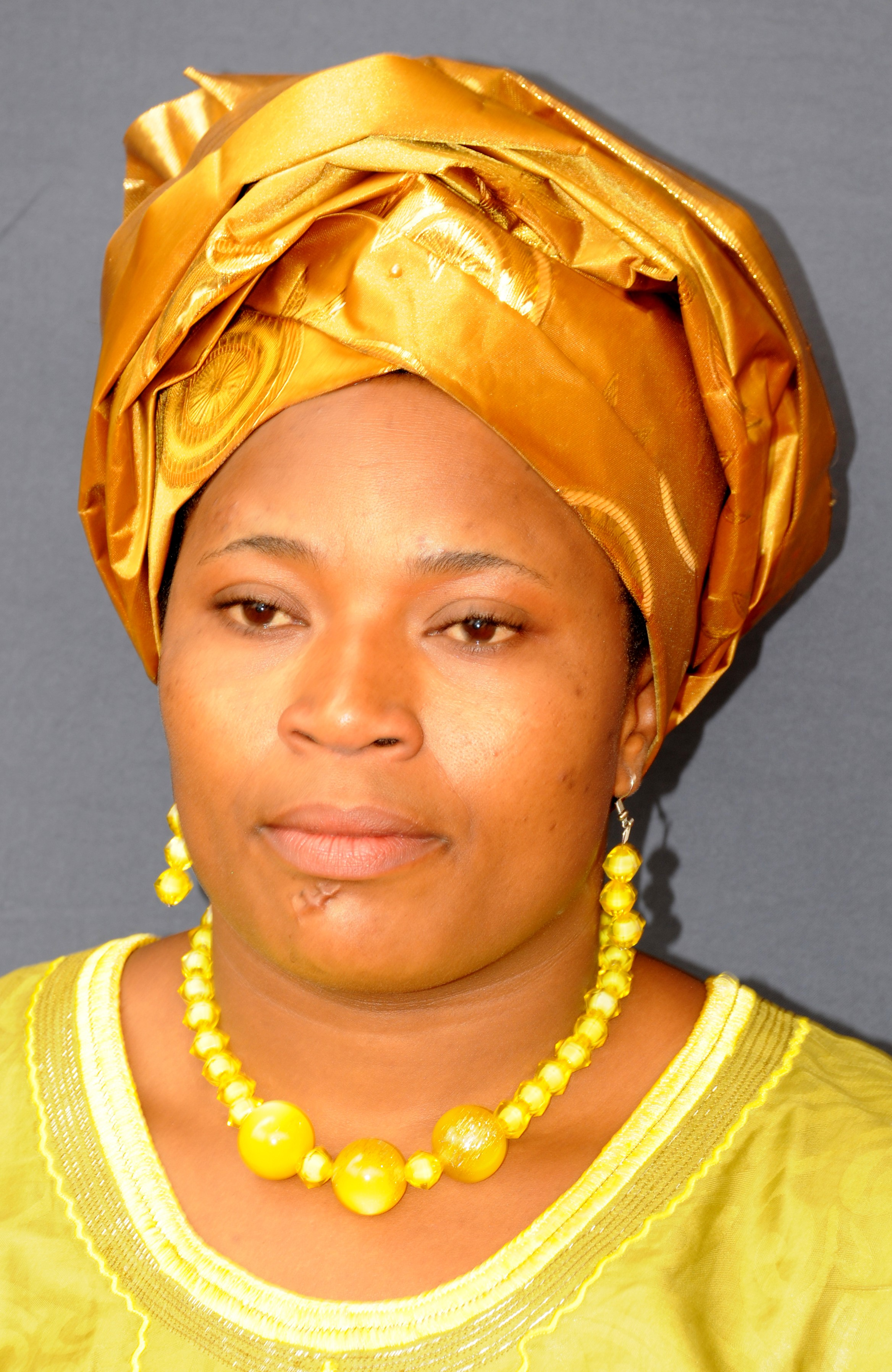
- Born: 5 December 1976 (age 49)
- Citizenship: Ugandan
- Education: Kayonza Primary School; Bishop Comboni College; Law Development Centre, Kampala; Uganda Christian University, Mukono
- Occupations: Lawyer and politician
- Employer(s): Bwenye and Ndyomugabe Advocates; Kanungu district Parliament of Uganda
- Known for: Politics
- Political party: National Resistance Movement
- Spouse: Single

Elizabeth Beikiriize Karungi, commonly known as Elizabeth Karungi NRM (born 5 December 1976), is a female Ugandan politician who served as the District Woman Representative for Kanungu District in Uganda's 10th Parliament, a position she has occupied since 2011. She is a lawyer by profession and a member of the National Resistance Movement (NRM) party, Uganda's National ruling political party.

== Early life and education ==
Karungi was born on 5 December 1976. She did her Primary Leaving Examinations in 1990 at Kayonza Primary School. She completed her O-Level (UCE) at Bishop Comboni College in 1994 and later her A-Level (UACE) from the same school in 1999. She graduated with a Diploma in Law from the Law Development Centre, Kampala in 2001. Thereafter, she proceeded to Uganda Christian University, Mukono for a Bachelor of Laws eventually graduating in 2006. She returned to Law Development Centre in 2007 for a diploma in legal practice.

== Career ==
Karungi is a trained lawyer and worked as a Legal Officer at Bwenye and Ndyomugabe Advocates between 2008 and 2011. She later joined elective politics and have been serving as the district woman representative for Kanungu district since 2011.

== Personal life ==
Elizabeth Karungi is married and has 3 children

== Controversy ==
Following a 2011 report on high travel costs for members of parliament, Elizabeth Karungi questioned the criteria that was used to select the staff that were travelling.

A 2017 report on corruption in Uganda's mining sector in Uganda by Global Witness cited Elizabeth Karungi as a beneficiary of a licence that enabled her to mine and explore for minerals in Bwindi Forest even though it was a gazetted area with endangered species. The report recommended an investigation into her by the Inspector General of Government, Uganda.

In October 2018, it was reported that Members of the 10th Parliament of Uganda had almost failed to debate on the motion for adoption of the report of the Public Service and Local Government Committee on the petition on pending eviction of traders, lock-up owners, special hire operators and taxi owners from Mukono Taxi Park. This was because she as well as her committee chairperson were not in the House to present their report.

== Membership and committees ==
- Member – Committee on Government Assurances
- Member – Uganda Women Parliamentary Association (UWOPA)
- Vice Chairperson – Public Service Committee
- Vice Chairperson – Uganda Parliamentary Forum for children (UPFC)

== See also ==
- List of members of the ninth Parliament of Uganda
- List of members of the tenth Parliament of Uganda
- Kanungu District
- Parliament of Uganda
- Member of Parliament
- National Resistance Movement
