= Peter Mugyenyi =

Ugandan physician, HIV/AIDS researcher, medical administrator, and author

- Born: 1949 (age 76–77); Uganda
- Citizenship: Uganda
- Education: Makerere University (Bachelor of Medicine and Bachelor of Surgery); Undisclosed Institution (Diploma in Child Health); Royal College of Physicians of Ireland (Fellow of the Royal College of Physicians of Ireland); Royal College of Physicians of Edinburgh (Fellow of the Royal College of Physicians of Edinburgh); Mbarara University (Honorary Doctor of Science)
- Occupations: Physician, HIV/AIDS Researcher, Medical Administrator & Author
- Years active: 1972–present
- Known for: HIV/AIDS Research
- Title: Medical director, Joint Clinical Research Centre

Peter Ndimbirwe Mugyenyi is a Ugandan physician, HIV/AIDS researcher, medical administrator and author. He is executive director and co-founder of the Joint Clinical Research Centre, and a leading authority on treatment of HIV/AIDS in Africa.

== Early life and education ==
Mugyenyi was born in Rukungiri District in the Western Region of Uganda, circa 1949. He attended Kings College Budo, a mixed, boarding secondary school, before he was admitted to Makerere University to study human medicine. He graduated with the degree of Bachelor of Medicine and Bachelor of Surgery. Following his studies at Makerere, he had to flee the country in the early 1970s, under the pursuit of Idi Amin’s secret police. He migrated to the United Kingdom, where he obtained the Diploma in Child Health, the title of Fellow of the Royal College of Physicians of Ireland and that of Fellow of the Royal College of Physicians of Edinburgh. In 2003, he was awarded the degree of Doctor of Science, by Mbarara University in Uganda.

== Career in the United Kingdom ==
While in the United Kingdom, he became a successful consultant pediatrician. But in the early 1990s, he voluntarily returned to his native Uganda to help his country battle the AIDS epidemic, which was still expanding at that time. The working conditions were dire and the salary, a mere fraction of his income in the UK. He had to undergo fresh training in HIV epidemiology.

== Leadership in the battle for treatment of HIV/AIDS in Africa ==
He was one of the first prominent figures in the global medical community to argue that Africans could, and would, successfully follow antiretroviral treatment regimens. At that time few people believed that would happen. History has proven him correct. In 1992, Mugyenyi co-founded and became the Medical Director of the Joint Clinical Research Centre, Africa's largest AIDS treatment and research center. He is recognized as one of the leading HIV/AIDS researchers in the world.

In 2002, he ordered a shipment of low-cost generic ARVs from India, in direct defiance of Uganda's patent laws, challenging the authorities to arrest him and refusing to leave the airport until the drugs were allowed into the country and guarantees were given that future shipments would also be cleared.

This action led virtually overnight to a tenfold increase in the number of people on ARVs in Uganda, and effectively ended the blockade of low-cost generic AIDS drugs into Africa. Today almost all Africans on ARVs take generics, the great majority of which still come from India. Mugyenyi also played a major consultative role in the formulation of the PEPFAR (‘President's Emergency Plan for AIDS Relief’) program, which was announced at the 2003 State of the Union address by President George W. Bush. Mugyenyi was seated beside Laura Bush when the announcement was made, and President Bush made reference to him in the speech. PEPFAR has since put millions of Africans on lifesaving antiretroviral treatment, and is widely viewed as by far the single most positive legacy of George W. Bush's two terms in the White House.

In September 2003, Mugyenyi was honored by the International Association of Physicians in AIDS Care and presented with the Hero in Medicine Award. In February 2014, he was appointed as an independent Director, to the Board of Cipla, the Indian pharmaceutical company with an ARV manufacturing factory in Uganda. He served as the Chancellor of Mbarara University of Science and Technology, one of Uganda's eight public universities from 22 August 2008 to 28 October 2017.

In 2003, Peter Mugyenyi delivered the keynote address at the Ugandan North American Association (UNAA) convention in Boston, Massachusetts.

== Authorship ==
Mugyenyi's landmark 2008 book Genocide by Denial: How Profiteering from HIV/AIDS Killed Millions details how Western governments and drug companies callously oversaw the deaths of millions of Africans who would never have been able to afford their branded drugs. A follow-up to the earlier book, A Cure Too Far: The Struggle to End HIV/AIDS, was published in early 2013.

Mugyenyi's role in the battle for mass antiretroviral treatment in Africa is portrayed in the 2013 film Fire in the Blood, and he was invited by the producers to be the guest of honor when the film debuted at the 2013 Sundance Film Festival in Park City, Utah, USA. His appearance generated several standing ovations at Sundance.

== See also ==
- Ugandan University Leaders
- Ugandan Hospitals
