= Jackline Kemigisa =

Ugandan journalist, writer, and researcher

- Citizenship: Ugandan
- Education: Bachelor of Arts, Master's in Journalism
- Occupations: Journalist, researcher
- Employer(s): Center for Arts, Design and Social Research
- Known for: Co-hosting Wulira Uganda podcast
- Notable work: Her influence in challenging of anti-homosexual act in Uganda
- Board member of: Innovate Africa, Parliament Watch Uganda

Jackline Kemigisa is a Ugandan feminist journalist, writer, researcher, human rights activist and podcaster. As a journalist she writes for both national and international media publications. Kemigisa, as an activist, participated in the implementation of anti-homosexual act in Uganda. She has also written many articles about the colonial systems in the colonial Uganda and the current systems, especially those concerning human rights such as prisons and education systems, feminisms, media, history, decolonization, democracy, and governance.

== Education ==
Kemigisa graduated from Makerere University in 2016 with a bachelor of arts in business administration, communication, journalism and related fields. She then joined New York University in 2018 where she graduated with a master's in journalism, studio 20 program, digital communication and media/multimedia.

== Career ==
Kemigisa is currently a research affiliate with the Center for Arts Design and Social Research, working with the team organizing the Black Planetary Future Conversations.

As a podcaster, Kemigisa co-hosts the Wulira history podcast, focusing on rewriting women in their Ugandan history.

She is also part of the team curating research and documentation on women's participation in funeral and burial rituals, dead or alive, in Africa: a platform seeking to find ways women can liberate themselves outside of the patriarchal cis-hete frame dictated on their death in African communities. Her research focusing on feminist resistance has been instrumental in formulating tools for women human rights defenders, as well as feminist aspiring leaders in Uganda. Kemigisa's latest contribution documenting digital feminist organization in Eastern Africa was published as part of 150 Years of Journalism in Eastern Africa.

Kemigisa also works as head of content for Parliament Watch Uganda, and as a contributing writer in different media channels such as Women's Media center, the Independent, and Lakwena Uganda.

She was also a board member of Innovate Africa, and media coordinator for Center for African Cultural Excellence. She also writes as a freelancer journalist under Eagle online.
