= Joint Clinical Research Centre =

Medical research institution in Kampala, Uganda

Coordinates: 0.242954°N 32.561729°E

- JCRC

Medical Research Institute overview
- Formed: January 1, 1990; 36 years ago
- Type: Medical Research Institute
- Jurisdiction: Government of Uganda
- Headquarters: Lubowa Hill; 101 Entebbe Road; Lubowa, Wakiso District, Uganda
- Medical Research Institute executives: Justine Opio-Epelu, Chairman; Peter Mugyenyi, Executive Director; Cissy Kityo, Deputy Executive Director
- Website: Homepage

The Joint Clinical Research Centre (JCRC) is a medical research institution in Uganda, specializing in HIV/AIDS treatment and management.

== Location ==
The headquarters of JCRC are located on Lubowa Hill, at Plot 101 Entebbe Road, approximately 11 kilometres (7 mi), by road, southeast of Kampala, the capital and largest city of Uganda. The geographical coordinates of the institution's headquarters are: 0°14'34.6"N 32°33'42.2"E (Latitude:0.242954; Longitude:32.561729).

== Overview ==
Founded in 1990, JCRC is a collaborative effort by three Ugandan ministries to address the challenges posed by HIV/AIDS and related infections: (a) the Ministry of Health, (b) the Ministry of Education and (c) the Ministry of Defence. The institution works in close collaboration with Makerere University College of Health Sciences (MUCHS).

== Research ==
JCRC focuses on HIV/AIDS research in all age groups, clinical trials of ARVs, nutritional and social interventions and the concomitant treatment of tuberculosis. The institution also carries out malaria research. The majority of the institution's research projects are in collaboration with national, regional and international organisations, including funding agencies, international health research institutions, international NGOs and universities, as well as corporate philanthropists.

== Governance ==
The research centre is administered by an eight-person board of directors, chaired by Justine Opio-Epelu. Other board members include Prof. Nelson Sewankambo, the immediate past Principal of Makerere University College of Health Sciences. Prof. Peter Mugyenyi, the internationally recognized HIV/AIDS researcher and pediatrician, who founded the institution, serves as the centre's executive director.

== Future plans ==
The JCRC has plans to build an international research hospital worth US$120 million in collaboration with Tokushukai Medical Group of Japan. Commitment for 70 percent funding has been obtained from the African Development Bank (AfDB).

In March 2018, the institution procured an apheresis machine, which enables healthcare personnel to extract only those selected blood components from a donor's or patient's blood, and return the non-selected components back into the bloodstream of the donor/patient. This technique is of particular significance and utility, when treating patients with sickle cell disease and HIV/AIDS.

== Developments ==
In July 2022, JCRC announced that later that year, the institution would start offering bone marrow transplant services. Before that, many Ugandans who needed the treatment had to travel to India, where the it could be obtained least expensively.

That same month, JCRC announced that a working collaboration had been established between (a) Makerere University (b) Mbarara University (c) JCRC (d) the University of Western Ontario and (e) the Schulich School of Medicine & Dentistry. As part of that collaboration, a modern state-of-the-art research facility will be constructed at JCRC at a budgeted cost of US$33 million (approx. USh 124 billion). The new research facility will accommodate more research scientists from both countries in the fields of common scientific interest.

In March 2026, the JCRC in partnership with other entities including the Rotary Club International, Pearl Bank, the Buganda Government and others, began a public fundraising campaign to establish a bone marrow transplant facility at the JCRC hospital at Lubowa, Wakiso District. The facility is estimated to cost US$5.35 million to establish. With US$1.35 million already raised, US$4 million is what is needed.

== See also ==
- Health in Uganda
- List of hospitals in Uganda
