= African Health Sciences =

- Discipline: Health care
- Language: English

Publication details
- History: 2001-present
- Publisher: Makerere University Medical School (Uganda)
- Frequency: Quarterly
- Open access: Yes

Standard abbreviations
- ISO 4: Afr. Health Sci.

Indexing
- ISSN: 1680-6905 (print); 1729-0503 (web)
- LCCN: 2003243007
- OCLC no.: 60639520

Links
- Journal homepage; Online archives

African Health Sciences is a quarterly peer-reviewed open access medical journal covering clinical practice and public health policy relevant to Africa and low-income countries. The editor-in-chief is James K. Tumwine (Makerere University), who established the journal in 2001.

The journal is abstracted and indexed by Index Medicus/MEDLINE/PubMed.
