= Patrick Edrin Kyamanywa =

Ugandan surgeon, academic

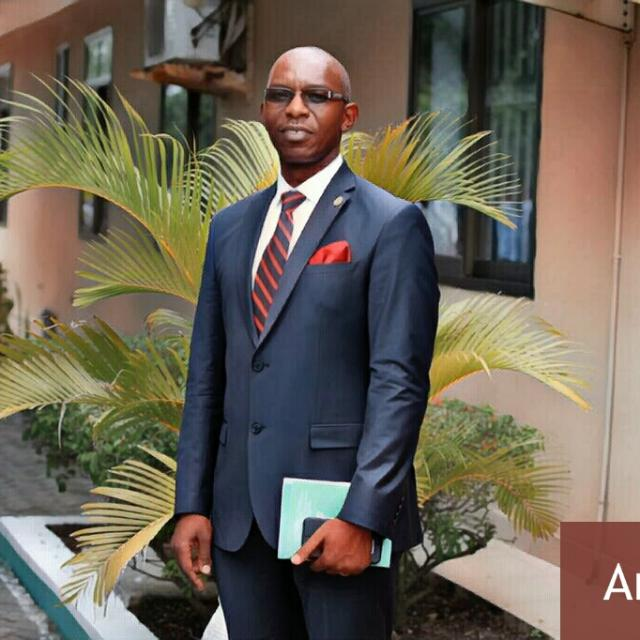
- Education: University of Leeds, College of Surgeons of East, Central and Southern Africa (COSESCA), Makerere University
- Employer: Uganda Martyrs University
- Title: Vice Chancellor
- Predecessor: John Chrysostom Maviiri

Patrick Edrin Kyamanywa is a Ugandan surgeon, academic, academic administrator and researcher. He is currently the Vice Chancellor of Uganda Martyrs University, a faith-based private university owned by the Episcopal Conference of Uganda. He assumed office on 1 December 2021 replacing Maviiri John, who retired. He was installed as the 4th Vice Chancellor of Uganda Martyrs University on 17 March 2022.

== Career ==
He is the Vice Chancellor of Uganda Martyrs University.

== Research ==
He is an experienced researcher and his articles have been published in several authoritative journals globally as listed below:

- "Awareness, knowledge, attitude and practice towards measures for prevention of the spread of COVID-19 in the Ugandans: A nationwide online cross-sectional Survey".
- "Health professional training and capacity strengthening through international academic partnerships: The first five years of the Human Resources for Health Program in Rwanda" published in International Journal of Health Policy and Management.
- "Non-physician clinicians in sub-Saharan Africa and the evolving role of physicians". Published in International journal of health policy and management.
- "Road traffic injuries: cross-sectional cluster randomized countrywide population data from 4 low-income countries." Published in the International Journal of Surgery.
- "Self-reported determinants of access to surgical care in 3 developing countries." Published in JAMA surgery.
- "Injury, disability and access to care in Rwanda: results of a nationwide cross-sectional population study." Published in the World journal of surgery.
- "Can focused trauma education initiatives reduce mortality or improve resource utilization in a low-resource setting?" Published in World journal of surgery.
- "The human resources for health program in Rwanda—a new partnership"
- "Building research capacity in Africa: equity and global health collaborations"
- "Rwanda 20 years on: investing in life"
- "Estimating operative disease prevalence in a low-income country: results of a nationwide population survey in Rwanda"
- "Epidemiology of injuries presenting to the national hospital in Kampala, Uganda: implications for research and policy."
- "Strategies to improve clinical research in surgery through international collaboration"
- "Hepatitis B and C seroprevalence among health care workers in a tertiary hospital in Rwanda"
- "Implementation of the World Health Organization Trauma Care Checklist Program in 11 centers across multiple economic strata: effect on care process measures"
- "Anaesthesia for elective inguinal hernia repair in rural Ghana-appeal for local anaesthesia in resource-poor countries"
- "Sterilized mosquito net versus commercial mesh for hernia repair"
- "Prevalence of breast masses and barriers to care: Results from a population‐based survey in Rwanda and Sierra Leone"
- "A comparison of Kampala trauma score II with the new injury severity score in Mbarara University Teaching Hospital in Uganda"

== See also ==
- John Maviiri
- Kampala International University
- Uganda Martyrs University
- University of Rwanda
