= Charles Olweny =

Ugandan physician, oncologist, researcher, academic and academic administrator

- Born: 3 June 1940 (age 86); Tororo, Uganda
- Citizenship: Uganda
- Education: Makerere University (Bachelor of Medicine and Bachelor of Surgery) (MMed – Internal Medicine) (Doctor of Medicine)
- Occupations: Physician, researcher, academic & academic administrator
- Years active: 1971–present
- Title: Former chancellor of Mbarara University and professor of Medicine; Uganda Martyrs University

Charles Mark Lwanga Olweny is a Ugandan physician, oncologist, academic and medical researcher. Currently he is a professor of medicine and Immediate past vice-chancellor at Uganda Martyrs University, based at Nkozi, Mpigi District, in Central Uganda.

== Background ==
Olweny was born in 1940, in Tororo, Tororo District, in Eastern Uganda.

== Education ==
Olweny attended St. Peter's College Tororo, for his O-Level education (S1-S4). He attended St. Mary's College Kisubi for his A-Level classes (S5-S6). In 1961, Olweny entered Makerere University School of Medicine, the oldest medical school in Uganda and East Africa, which was founded in 1924. He graduated with the degree of Bachelor of Medicine and Bachelor of Surgery (MBChB), in 1966. Later, he obtained the degree of Master of Medicine in Internal Medicine (MMed). He followed that with the degree of Doctor of Medicine (MD), all from Makerere University. Olweny's chosen speciality is medical oncology.

== Career ==
Olweny served as the director of the Uganda Cancer Institute from 1972 until 1982. Under his stewardship, the team of Ugandan medical researchers that he led were the first group to demonstrate that liver cancer could be successfully treated with chemotherapy using the drug doxorubicin, which is still the mainstay of treatment for liver cancer today. They were also able to confirm that Burkitt lymphoma could be cured with a high dose of chemotherapy, and showed that the same was true for childhood Hodgkin disease. They documented the incidence of endemic Kaposi sarcoma in children, and conducted clinical trials on how to treat it.

During the same timeframe, Olweny served – first as a lecturer, then senior lecturer and later as professor of Medicine – in the Faculty of Internal Medicine, at Makerere University School of Medicine, serving as head of department, from 1979 until 1982. While in Australia, during the 1980s, he served as clinical professor at the Department of Medicine & Surgery, University of Adelaide, Adelaide, South Australia. He also served as senior director for Medical Oncology, Cancer Control Programme, Royal Adelaide Hospital.

In the 1990s, Olweny migrated to Winnipeg, Manitoba, Canada, to take up appointment as medical oncologist at St. Boniface General Hospital, in Winnipeg. He also served as coordinator, Section of Hematology & Oncology at CancerCare Manitoba, and as an associate staff member at the Health Sciences Centre in Winnipeg. He was appointed as vice chancellor of Uganda Martyrs University in 2006, and assumed office in September of that year.

Olweny has written over 20 books and over 120 professional articles.

On 1 January 2015, Olweny retired as the vice chancellor of Uganda Martyrs University, handing over the role to Prof. Dr. John Chrysostom Maviiri, formerly vice chancellor of the Catholic University of Eastern Africa in Nairobi.

Olweny was installed as chancellor of Mbarara University of Science and Technology on 28 October 2017.

== Personal details ==
Olweny is married, with five adult children.
