= Rifat Atun =

British Physician and academic

Rifat Atun MBBS, MBA, DIC, FRCGP, FFPH, FRCP
- Education: University of London, Imperial College London
- Known for: Health systems theory, health systems reform, innovation and health systems
- Awards: Web of Science, Clarivate, World’s Highly Cited Researcher (2020, 2021, 2022), Honorary Master of Arts, Harvard University (2014)
- Scientific career
- Fields: Global Health Systems, Healthcare Innovation, Systems Theory
- Workplaces: Harvard University, Imperial College, University of London
- Website: Official website

Rifat Atun is a Turkish Cypriot physician and academic who, as of January 2024, serves as the Professor of Global Health Systems and Director of the Health System Innovation Lab at Harvard University. He is one of the most important figures in the contemporary study of comparative health systems and healthcare innovation and has made substantial contributions to health systems theory, health systems reform, and innovation in health systems.

== Career ==
Atun served as the Faculty Chair for the Harvard Ministerial Leadership Program from 2015 to 2022. He was a member of the Executive Management Team of the Global Fund from 2008 to 2012, where he held the position of Director of Strategy, Performance, and Evaluation. From 2006 to 2013, Atun was a Professor of International Health Management at Imperial College London and Head of the Health Management Group.

In addition to his academic work, Atun has advised governments on health system reforms, the World Bank, WHO, and leading health and life science companies. He served as a senior advisor to the G20 Presidency from 2019 to 2020 and co-chaired the T20 Health Track and the Task Force on Global Health Security and COVID-19 for the G20 Indonesian Presidency. He is a member of the Longitude Prize Committee and the founding Board Chair of Movement Health Foundation, a Swiss foundation that supports innovations aimed at solving major global health challenges through digital solutions. He is also the Founding President of the Global Surgery Foundation based in Geneva.

== Research and publications ==
Atun's research focuses on health systems performance, design, and innovation. He has published more than 450 articles in leading journals, including NEJM, Nature Medicine, Lancet, Lancet Oncology, JAMA, and Academy of Management Journal. He has also led and participated in 15 Lancet Commissions. In 2020, 2021, and 2022, he was recognized by Web of Science as one of the World's Most Highly Cited Researchers.

== Education and honors ==
Atun studied medicine at the University of London as a Commonwealth Scholar and later completed his clinical training in family medicine. He also obtained an MBA from Imperial College London. He is a Fellow of the Royal College of Physicians, the Faculty of Public Health, and the Royal College of General Practitioners in the UK.

== Awards and memberships ==
Rifat Atun has been awarded many prestigious awards for his excellence works in healthcare researches in the healthcare fields.

- College Teaching Award - 2007
- Longitude Prize Committee
