= Nelson Sewankambo =

Professor of medicine in Uganda

Professor Nelson Sewankambo FRCP
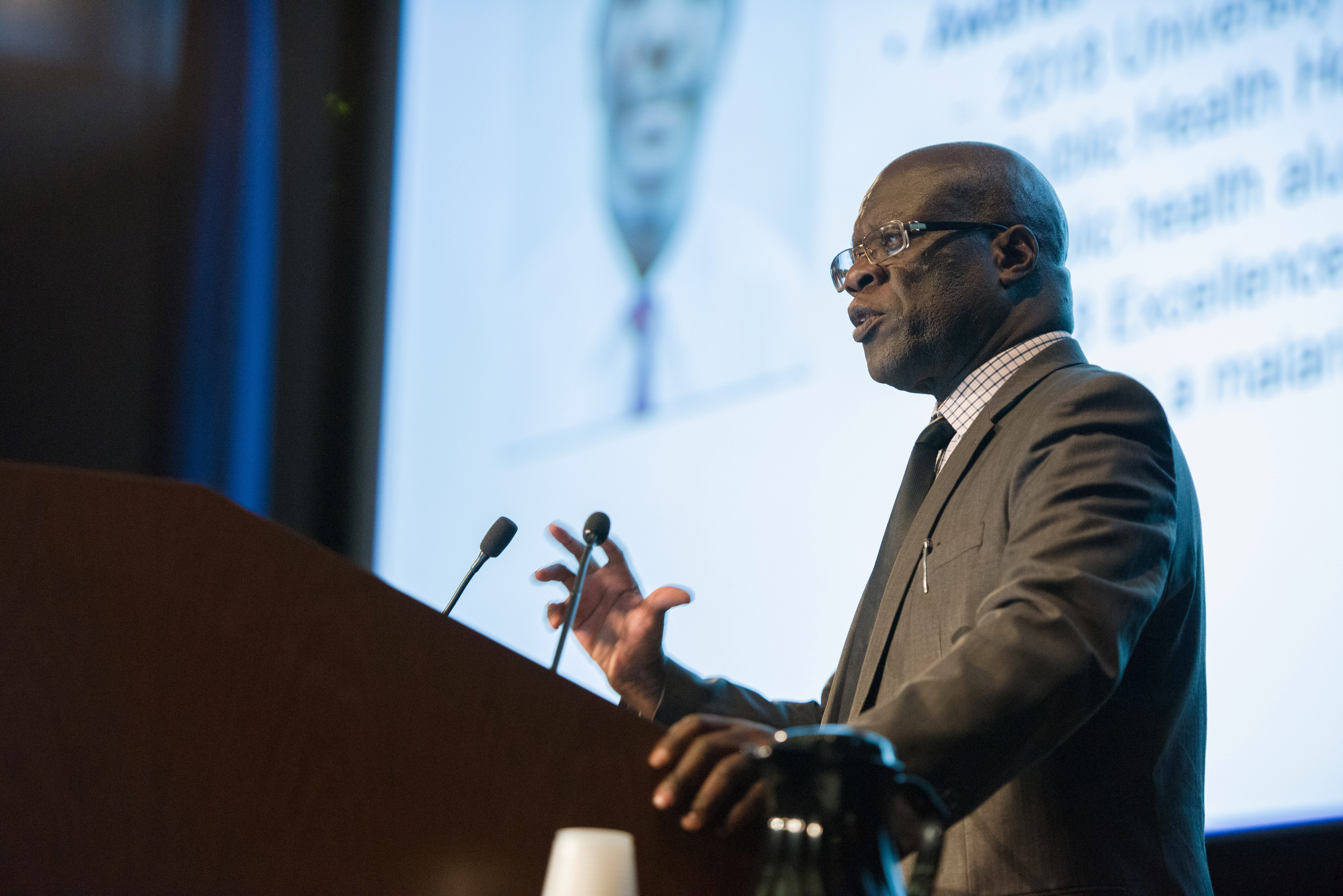
- Born: 1951 (age 74–75); Mulago Hospital, Uganda
- Citizenship: Uganda
- Education: Makerere University (Bachelor of Medicine & Bachelor of Surgery) (Master of Medicine in Medicine); McMaster University (Master of Science in clinical epidemiology) (Honorary Doctor of Laws); Royal College of Physicians (Fellow of the Royal College of Physicians)
- Occupations: Physician, researcher, academic administrator
- Years active: 1978–present
- Title: Immediate past principal, Makerere University College of Health Sciences

Nelson Kawulukusi Sewankambo is a Ugandan physician, academician, medical researcher, and medical administrator. He is a professor of medicine and former principal of the Makerere University College of Health Sciences, a semi-autonomous constituent college of Makerere University.

== Background ==
Sewankambo was born at Mulago Hospital, in Kampala, Uganda's capital city, in 1951.

== Education ==
Sewankambo was educated at Namilyango College, an all-boys residential middle and high school (grades eight to thirteen) located in Mukono District, from 1965 until 1970. In 1971, he entered the Makerere University School of Medicine, where he obtained a degree of Bachelor of Medicine and Bachelor of Surgery, graduating in 1976. He went on to obtain a Master of Medicine degree, specializing in Internal Medicine, also from Makerere in the early 1980s. He later obtained a Master of Science degree in Clinical Epidemiology, from McMaster University in Hamilton, Ontario, Canada. He is a Fellow of the Royal College of Physicians. He was later awarded an honorary degree of Doctor of Laws by McMaster University.

== Work experience ==
In the early 1980s, Sewankambo was one of the earliest physicians in Uganda to recognize the new disease that caused patients to lose weight and "slim" down to abnormal cachectic sizes. The new disease, at first called Slim Disease, became known as HIV/AIDS. He has been at the forefront of research about the disease, specializing in HIV clinical drug trials. He has extensively published the finding of his research in medical journals and other peer publications.

In the late 1990s, Sewankambo was appointed dean of Makerere University School of Medicine. He served in that position until 2007, when he was promoted to the position of principal of Makerere University College of Health Sciences, a position he still occupies.

He has been engaged in a number of international boards, including the board of the Norwegian Global Health and Vaccination Research from 2011 to 2014.

== Other considerations ==
Sewankambo is a fellow of the Uganda National Academy of Sciences.

== See also ==
- Uganda AIDS Commission
