= Jesca Ruth Ataa =

Ugandan human rights defender and activist

- Born: Jesca Ruth Ataa; Kotido, Karamoja, Uganda
- Occupations: Human rights defender, Activist
- Known for: Leadership of Nakere Rural Women Activists (NARWOA)

Jesca Ruth Ataa

Jesca Ruth Ataa is a Ugandan human rights defender, Activist and the leader of Nakere Rural Women Activists (NARWOA), a community-based organization in Kotido, Karamoja. Established in 2002, NARWOA addresses issues including domestic violence, political instability, and economic empowerment for women. Ataa's work has reached over 15,000 women and 250,000 children. She was shortlisted for the 2024 EU Human Rights Defenders Award.

== Background and education ==
Jesca Ruth Ataa was born in Kotido, Karamoja, Uganda where her background and experiences in the region have significantly influenced her advocacy work.

== Career and advocacy ==
Ataa is a human rights defender, particularly known for her work with Nakere Rural Women Activists (NARWOA). Established in November 2002, NARWOA is an umbrella organization that supports women’s groups across the Kotido District. The organization focuses on addressing humanitarian crises, cross-border and inter-ethnic political instability, domestic violence, and discrimination against women.

As the leader of NARWOA, Ataa has been instrumental in developing programs that empower women economically and socially. NARWOA’s initiatives have reached over 15,000 women and 250,000 children, providing them with opportunities for viable income-generating activities and improving household incomes and food security through increased agricultural production.

== Impact and recognition ==
In 2024, she was shortlisted for the EU Human Rights Defenders Award, recognizing her significant contributions to human rights in Uganda.

== Contributions to peace and conflict resolution ==
Ataa has been actively involved in peacebuilding initiatives. She has coordinated efforts with various organizations to mediate conflicts and promote peaceful coexistence in Karamoja. For instance, NARWOA organized peace expositions with funding from the Norwegian Government, facilitating dialogues between grassroots communities and policymakers on post-conflict reconstruction plans.
