= Muni University =

Public university in Uganda

Muni University (MU)
- Motto: "Transforming Lives"
- Type: Public
- Established: July 1, 2013; 12 years ago
- Chancellor: Henry Luke Orombi
- Vice-Chancellor: Simon Anguma Katrini
- Students: 380+ (2018)
- Location: Arua, Uganda; 02°59′51″N 30°55′33″E
- Campus: Urban
- Website: Homepage
- Location in Uganda

Muni University (MU) is a public multi-campus university in Uganda. It is one of the public universities and degree-awarding institutions in the country, licensed and supervised by the Uganda National Council for Higher Education (UNCHE).

== Location ==
Muni University has its main campus at Muni Hill in the city of Arua in Arua District, West Nile sub-region, in the Northern Region of Uganda. The campus is just south of Barifa Forest, approximately 3 kilometres (2 mi), by road, south-east of the central business district of Arua. This campus sits adjacent to and immediately north of Muni National Teachers College (MNTC), a 1,300 student, mixed gender, teacher training college.

The university owns land in the town of Okollo, Arua District, West Nile sub-region, where it plans to set up a second campus. Okollo is approximately 57 kilometres (35 mi), by road, south-east of Arua, the largest city in the sub-region, on the Arua–Nebbi Road.

Other locations where campuses might be established include at Bidibidi, in Yumbe District, approximately 75 kilometres (47 mi), by road, north of Arua, and at Pakwach, in Pakwach District, along the Albert Nile, where the university plans to establish a Faculty of Fisheries and Aquaculture.

== History ==
Efforts to establish a public university in the West Nile sub-region date back to January 2007 when a delegation of elders from the sub-region made a written request to the president of Uganda. In subsequent bilateral meetings between the Ugandan government and stakeholders from the sub-region, a set of core undergraduate courses was identified to anchor the founding of the institution. In 2009, the Ugandan government, through the Ministry of Education, consented to the creation of the university. A three-person task force was created to establish the university, with a starting date of January 2012. That task force was headed by Christine Dranzoa, the vice chancellor of the university including Dr. Lam Lagoro and Fr. Epiphany Picho . Initially, the university was named West Nile University, but after wider consultations, the name was changed to Muni University.

== Academic courses ==
MU has identified the following undergraduate courses to be offered in the academic year 2015/2016:

- Bachelor of Science in Information Technology
- Bachelor of Information Systems
- Bachelor of Science with Education
- Bachelor of Nursing Science
- Bachelor of Science in Agriculture
- Bachelor of Business Management and Entrepreneurship.
- According to Education News Uganda, Muni University signed a Memorandum of Understanding with AfriChild Centre to enhance research

New courses under development as of February 2019, pending approval of the UNCHE include:

- Bachelor of Science in Vocational and Technical Education.

== Student intake ==
MU was expected to admit its first batch of undergraduate students during the 2013/2014 academic year, beginning in August/September 2013. After a one-year delay, the first class of 100 students was admitted in November 2014. Another 100 students were admitted in August 2015.

In November 2018, the university graduated its second class of graduates, numbering 92, an increase from the first graduating class of 77, in 2017. At that time, only two courses were on offer; the Bachelor of Information Systems and Bachelors of Science in Information Technology.

== See also ==
- Education in Uganda
- List of universities in Uganda
- List of university leaders in Uganda
