= Nkozi =

- Map of Uganda showing the location of Nkozi
- Coordinates: 00°00′36″N 32°00′00″E
- Country: Uganda
- Region: Central Uganda
- District: Mpigi District
- Constituency: Mawokota County South

Government
  - Member of Parliament: Kenneth J. K. Bbosa
- Elevation: 1,200 m (3,900 ft)
- Time zone: UTC+3 (EAT)

Nkozi is a town in central Uganda. It is one of the urban centers in Mpigi District.

== Location ==
The town is situated along the Kampala–Masaka Road, approximately 85 kilometres (53 mi), southwest of Kampala, Uganda's capital and largest city. This location is approximately 8 kilometres (5.0 mi), north of Lake Victoria, at the point where River Katonga, exits the lake to begin its 220 kilometres (140 mi) journey west to Lake George. The coordinates of Nkozi town are:00 00 36N, 32 00 00E (Latitude:0.0100; Longitude:32.0000).

== Population ==
The exact population of Nkozi is not known, as of February 2010.

== Points of interest ==
The following points of interest lie within the town limits or close to the edges of town:

- The offices of Nkozi Town Council
- Nkozi Central Market
- The main campus of Uganda Martyrs University (UMU), one of Uganda's nearly 40 public and private universities.
- Nkozi Hospital - A 100-bed community hospital administered by the Catholic Church.
- River Katonga - The river exits Lake Victoria at Lukaya in Masaka District, approximately 8 kilometres (5.0 mi), south of Nkozi
- Lake Victoria - The northern shores of Africa's largest fresh-water lake lie approximately 8 kilometres (5.0 mi), directly south of the town.

== See also ==
- Mpigi District
- Katonga River
- Lake Victoria
- Uganda Martyrs University
- Lukaya
