= John Maviiri =

- Born: 1960 (age 65–66); Uganda
- Citizenship: Uganda
- Education: Makerere University (Diploma in Theology); Pontifical Urban University (Licentiate in Dogmatic Theology), (PhD in Dogmatic Theology)
- Occupation: Academic administrator
- Years active: 1987–present
- Title: Vice chancellor emeritus Uganda Martyrs University, Catholic University of Eastern Africa

John Chrysostom Maviiri is a Ugandan theologian, academic and academic administrator. He is the former vice chancellor of Uganda Martyrs University, a private university affiliated with the Roman Catholic Church in Uganda. He assumed office in January 2015 and retired in 2021, replacing Professor Charles Olweny, who retired.

== Background and education ==
Maviiri holds a Diploma in Theology, obtained from Makerere University, the oldest and largest public university in Uganda. He also holds a Licentiate in Dogmatic Theology and a Doctorate in Dogmatic Theology, both obtained from the Pontifical Urban University, in Rome, Italy. He has another Diploma in Theology from Ggaba National Major Seminary, and a Diploma in Philosophy from Alokolum Seminary in Gulu, Uganda.

== Career ==
Maviiri began his teaching career in 1987 at St. Mbaaga Seminary in Ggaba, Uganda, teaching there until 1991. From 1995 until 2002, he served as a lecturer, then senior lecturer and associate professor at Catholic University of Eastern Africa, in the Faculty of Theology. From 2002 until 2011, he served as the vice chancellor of the Catholic University of Eastern Africa. On 14 January 2015, he officially took over the office of vice chancellor at Uganda Martyrs University and retired in 2021 to concentrate on pastoral work at Lugazi Diocese.
