= Bishop Stuart University =

Private university in Uganda

Bishop Stuart University (BSU)
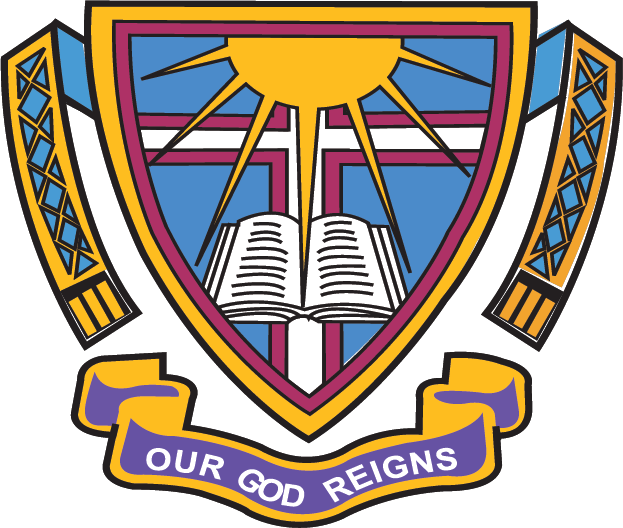
- Motto: Our God Reigns
- Type: Private
- Established: 2002
- Chancellor: Fred Sheldon Mwesigwa
- Vice-Chancellor: John F. Mugisha
- Students: 5000+ (2019)
- Location: Mbarara, Uganda; 00°36′10″S 30°41′44″E
- Campus: Urban
- Website: www.bsu.ac.ug
- Location within Uganda

Bishop Stuart University (BSU) is a private university in Uganda.

== History ==
BSU is named after Cyril Stuart who was the Anglican Bishop of Uganda in the middle of the 20th Century. BSU started operations in 2003 at the campus of then Kakoba National Teacher's College (KNTC) in the western Ugandan city of Mbarara. KNTC ceased operations at the end of 2005, and in 2006, BSU took over the premises and grounds previously occupied by the teachers' college. In 2006, BSU held its maiden graduation ceremony. However, the certificates, diplomas, and degrees were awarded by Uganda Christian University. The first batch of students to graduate on BSU letterheads were the graduates of 2009. On 10 October 2014, at the university's 10th graduation ceremony, Minister of Education Jessica Alupo announced that BSU had been cleared by the Uganda National Council for Higher Education to receive a university charter. The charter was granted and delivered to the university in late October 2014.

== See also ==
- Education in Uganda
- List of universities in Uganda

== Notable alumnus ==
1. Robert Mugabe Kakyebezi
