= Uganda Martyrs University =

Private university in Uganda

Uganda Martyrs University (UMU)
- Motto: Virtute et Sapientia Duc Mundum
- Motto in English: In Virtue and Wisdom Lead the World
- Type: Private
- Established: 1993
- Chancellor: Joseph Anthony Zziwa
- Vice-Chancellor: Kyamanywa Edrin Patrick
- Administrative staff: 400+ (2014)
- Students: 5,000+ (2014)
- Location: Nkozi, Uganda; 00°00′13″N 32°00′52″E
- Campus: Rural, town
- Website: www.umu.ac.ug
- Location in Uganda

Uganda Martyrs University (UMU) is a private University affiliated with the Roman Catholic Church in Uganda. The University is owned by the Episcopal Conference of the Catholic Bishops of Uganda. It is licensed by the Uganda National Council for Higher Education. UMU consists of seven faculties, two institutes, six campuses, nine departments, and three schools. As of March 2022, total student enrollment was 4,632. Of these, about 1,500 students were residential, while nearly 3,000 students were enrolled in UMU's distance learning programs. The number of staff members was over 400.

== Location ==
UMU's main campus is in Nkozi, Mpigi District, in the Central Region of Uganda, approximately 85 kilometres (53 mi), by road, southwest of Kampala, the capital and largest city of that country. The coordinates of this Campus are 0°00'13.0"N, 32°00'52.0"E (Latitude:0.003611; Longitude:32.014444).

== History ==
UMU was established in October 1993 with 84 students and two academic departments: the Institute of Ethics & Development Studies and the Faculty of Business Administration & Management.

At the university's 24th graduation ceremony on 8 November 2018, 2040 candidates graduated with certificates, diploma, bachelors, masters and doctoral degrees. The vice chancellor informed those present that 17 new courses had been introduced, including the Bachelor of Journalism and Bachelor of Inclusive Education, to bring the total number of courses on offer to 136. A new Faculty of Engineering at the campus in Fort Portal, in Western Uganda, was also declared open.

Raphael p'Mony Wokorach is the new Chairman of UMU's Governing Council succeeding Sanctus Lino Wanok who served for 8 years. In June 2023, he was unveiled at Pope Paul Memorial Hotel, Rubaga.

== Campuses ==
As of November 2018, UMU maintained campuses at the following locations:

- Main Campus: At Nkozi, about 82 kilometres (51 mi) south-west of Kampala, on the highway between Kampala and Masaka. This campus has halls of residence including Onyango, Haflet, Carabine, Mukasa and others.
- Masaka Campus: In Masaka City, about 119 kilometres (74 mi) by road south-west of Kampala. It started in 2005 as a coordinating centre for UMU distance learning programmes but turned into a campus in 2007.
- Lubaga Campus: At Lubaga, in Lubaga Division, within the city limits of Kampala on 3 acres (1.2 ha) of land. This campus houses the School of Diplomacy.
- Nsambya Campus: On the grounds of St. Francis Hospital Nsambya, on Nsambya Hill in Makindye Division in southern Kampala. This campus houses the Uganda Martyrs University School of Medicine which, in 2010, started offering the Master of Medicine degree in general surgery, obstetrics & gynecology, internal medicine, and pediatrics.
- Kabale Campus: In the south-western Ugandan city of Kabale.
- Moyo Campus: In the town of Moyo in the Northern Region, close to the border with South Sudan.
- Mbale Campus: In the city of Mbale, in the Eastern Region, at the foothills of Mount Elgon.
- Mbarara Campus: Located on Nyamitanga Hill, in the city of Mbarara, in the Western Region of Uganda, approximately 271 kilometres (168 mi) by road, west of Kampala.
- Lira Campus: In the city of Lira in the Northern Region, approximately 340 kilometres (210 mi), by road, north of Kampala.
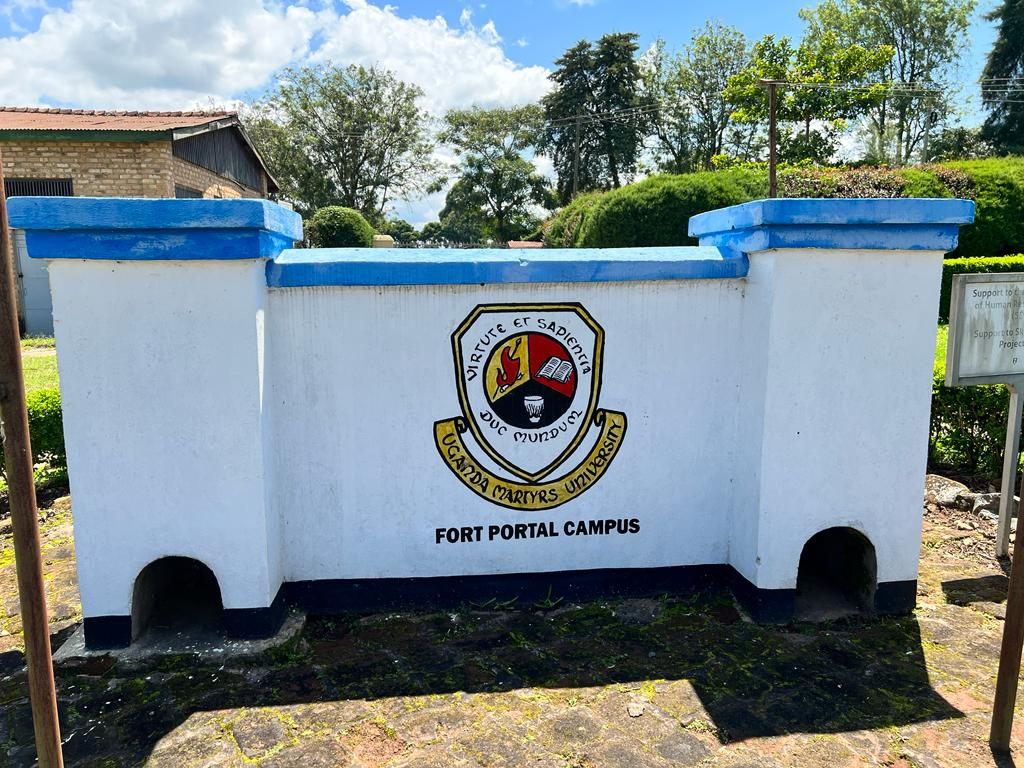
- Uganda Martyrs University Fort Portal Campus
  Kabarole Campus: In the city of Fort Portal, in the Western Region of Uganda, approximately 296 kilometres (184 mi), by road, west of Kampala. It houses the Faculty of Engineering.

== Notable Alumni and current faculty administrators ==
- David Burrell, Congregation of Holy Cross, Lecturer of Comparative Theology and Ethics
- Paul D'Arbela, Fellow of the Royal College of Physicians, Dean of Postgraduate Studies at Mother Kevin Postgraduate Medical School
- Patrick Edrin Kyamanywa, Vice Chancellor since 2021
- John Maviiri, Vice Chancellor since 2015-2021
- Charles Olweny, Vice Chancellor, 2006-2015
- Prof Otaala, Laura Ariko Institute of Languages
- Jovia Mutesi, the Inhebantu of Busoga of Busoga.
- Franc Kamugyisha, Ugandan social entrepreneur

== Academic units ==
=== Faculties, schools, institutes ===
Uganda Martyrs University comprises the following:

1. Faculty of Agriculture.
2. Faculty of Business Administration and Management.
3. Faculty of Education.
4. Faculty of Health Sciences.
5. Faculty of Science.
6. Faculty of Law
7. Faculty of the Built Environment.
8. Faculty of Engineering and applied Sciences.
9. Institute of Ethics.
10. Institute of Languages and Communication Studies.
11. Mother Kevin Postgraduate Medical School
12. School of Arts and Social Sciences.
13. School of Postgraduate Studies and Research.

=== Departments ===
- Library Department

== See also ==
- List of universities in Uganda
- Nkozi Hospital
- Nsambya Hospital
- Charles Olweny
- Education in Uganda
