= John Omagino =

- Born: Uganda
- Citizenship: Ugandan
- Education: Makerere University (Bachelor of Medicine and Bachelor of Surgery) (Master of Medicine in Surgery); College of Surgeons of East, Central and Southern Africa (Fellow of the College of Surgeons of East, Central and Southern Africa)
- Occupation: Consultant Cardiothoracic Surgeon
- Years active: 1986 — present
- Known for: Surgical skill
- Title: Executive Director; Uganda Heart Institute

John Odiri Ogund Omagino is a thoracic and cardiac surgeon in Uganda. He is the executive director of the Uganda Heart Institute (UHI). He is also a member of the board of directors of UHI.

== Background and education ==
He was born in Uganda, circa 1970. After attending Ugandan schools for his elementary and secondary education, he was admitted to Makerere University, where he studied human medicine. In 1985, he graduated from Makerere University School of Medicine, with a Bachelor of Medicine and Bachelor of Surgery (MBChB). He followed that with a Master of Medicine (MMed) degree in Surgery, in 1992. He is also a Fellow of the College of Surgeons of East, Central and Southern Africa (COSECSA). In 1995 he underwent training in Cardio-thoracic Surgery at the International Heart School in Bergamo, Italy.

== See also ==
- Peter Lwabi
- Mulago National Referral Hospital
- Makerere University College of Health Sciences
