= CURE International =

Christian nonprofit organization

CURE International Children's Hospitals
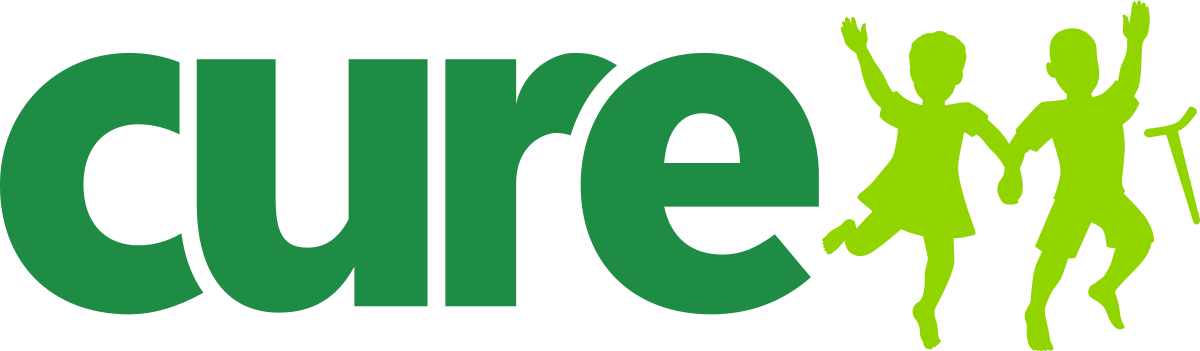
- Founded: 1996
- Founder: C. Scott Harrison, Sally Harrison
- Type: International child healthcare organization
- Purpose: International Healthcare
- Headquarters: Grand Rapids, Michigan, US
- Location: Niger, Malawi, Zambia, Zimbabwe, Ethiopia, Uganda, Kenya, the Philippines
- Region served: Africa and Asia
- Method: Surgery, advocacy, treatment
- Key people: Justin Narducci, President/CEO
- Revenue: $35 million
- Employees: 1200
- Website: cure.org

CURE International, based in Grand Rapids, MI, is a Christian nonprofit organization that owns and operates eight charitable children's hospitals around the world. CURE provides medical care to pediatric patients with orthopedic, reconstructive plastic, and neurological conditions. The organization's stated mission is to "heal the sick and proclaim the kingdom of God." The organization currently operates hospitals in Ethiopia, Kenya, Malawi, Niger, the Philippines, Uganda, Zambia and Zimbabwe.

CURE treats conditions like clubfoot, knock knees, bowed legs, cleft lip/palate, burn contractures, hydrocephalus, myelomeningocele, and encephalocele.

== The CURE Children's Hospital Network ==
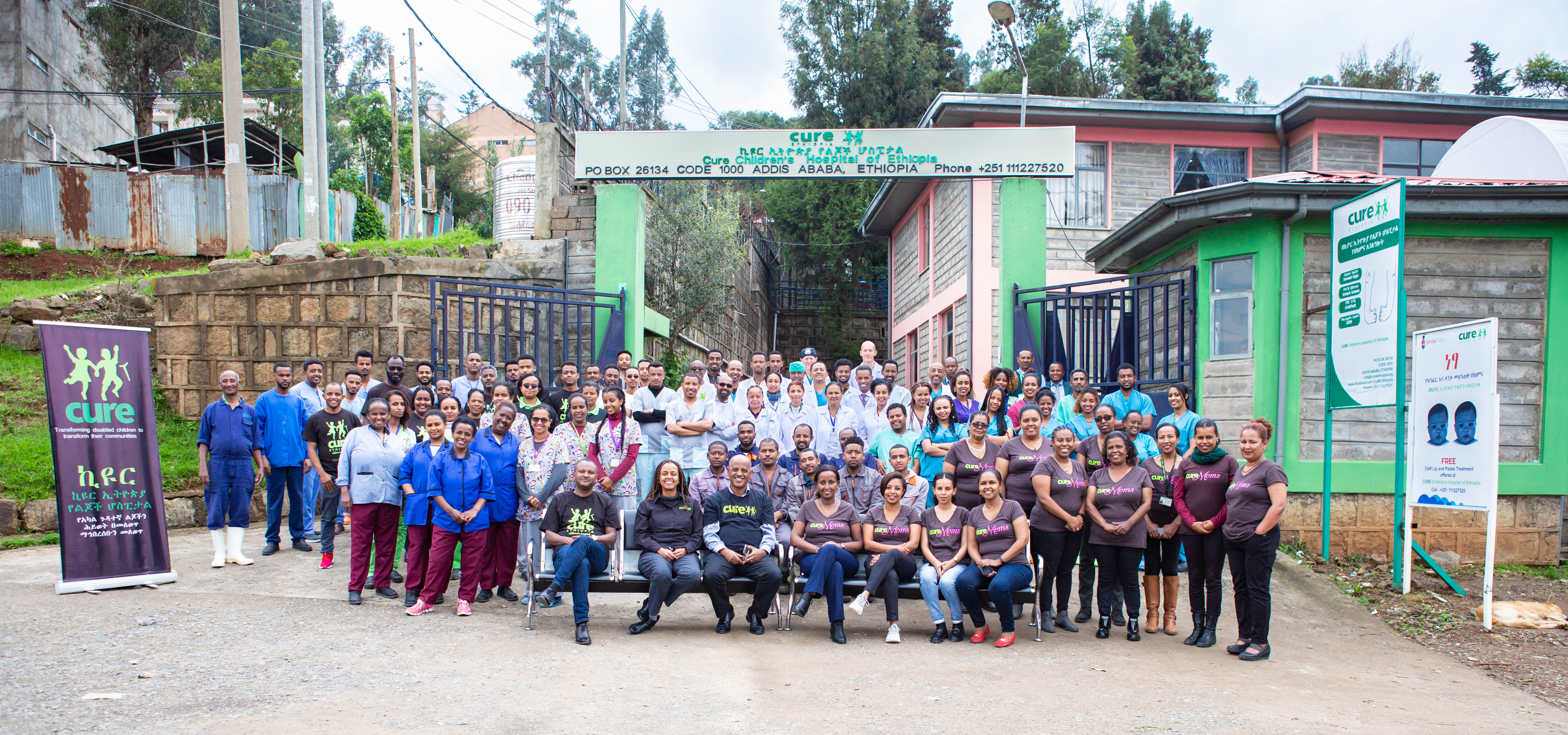
CURE Children's Hospital of Ethiopia

=== CURE Children's Hospital of Ethiopia ===
Established in 2008, CURE Ethiopia performs over 2,500 reconstructive and orthopedic surgeries every year for children suffering from treatable disabilities. Located in the capital city of Addis Ababa, the teaching hospital has 70 beds and four operating rooms. CURE International partners with The College of Surgeons of East, Central, and Southern Africa (COSECSA) to serve as a regional learning institution by implementing an orthopedic pediatric training program at the residency and fellowship levels. They are collaborate with Royal Cure Clinics - CURE Ethiopia also provides emotional and spiritual support to patients and their communities.

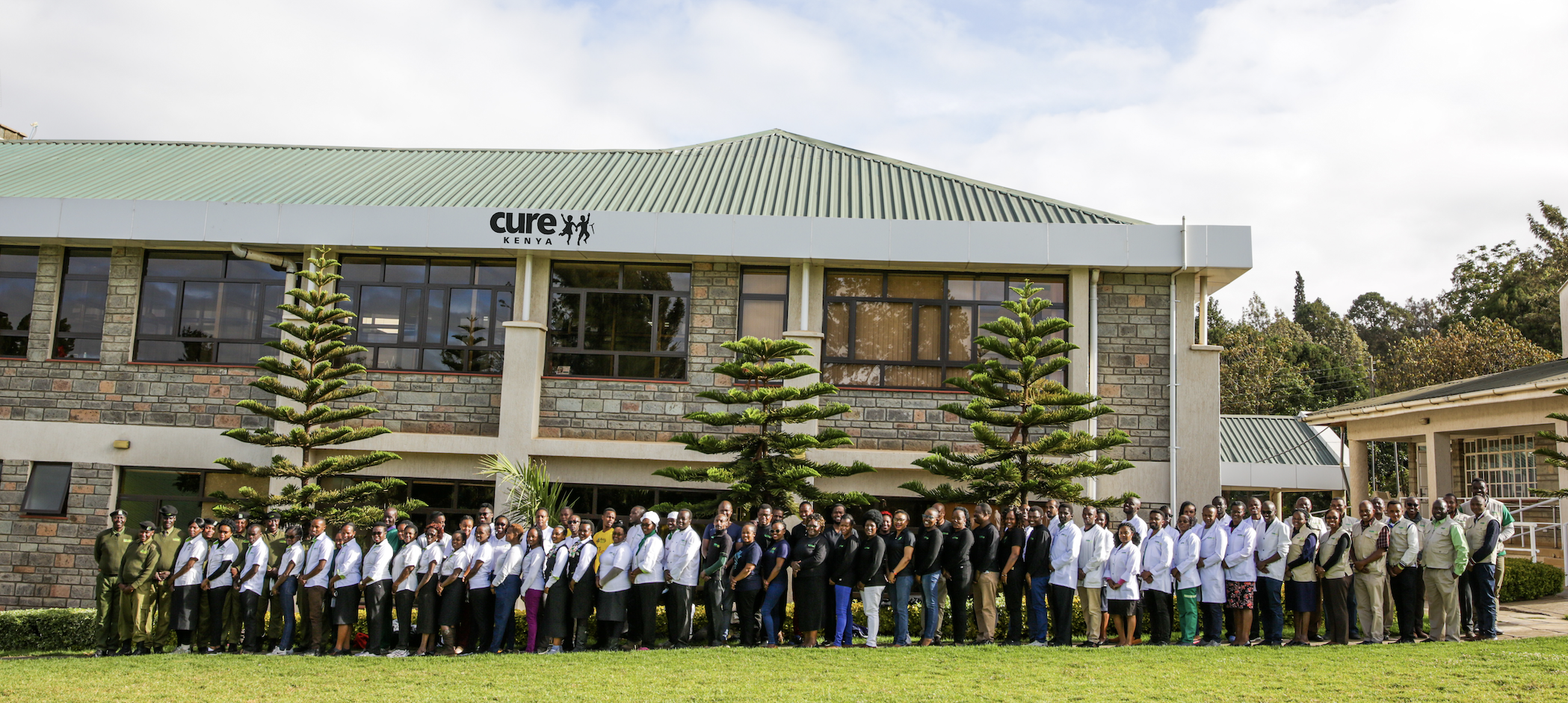
CURE Children's Hospital of Kenya in Kijabe

=== AIC-CURE Children's Hospital of Kenya ===
CURE Kenya was Africa's first orthopedic teaching hospital when it opened in Kijabe in 1998. Each year it performs over 1,500 reconstructive and orthopedic surgeries for children suffering from treatable disabilities. The teaching hospital has 47 beds and four operating rooms. CURE International partners with The College of Surgeons of East, Central, and Southern Africa (COSECSA) to serve as a regional learning institution by implementing an orthopedic pediatric training program at the residency and fellowship levels. CURE Kenya also provides emotional and spiritual support for patients and their communities. The African Inland Church (AIC) provided the initial land for the hospital premise as a gift to the people of Kenya.

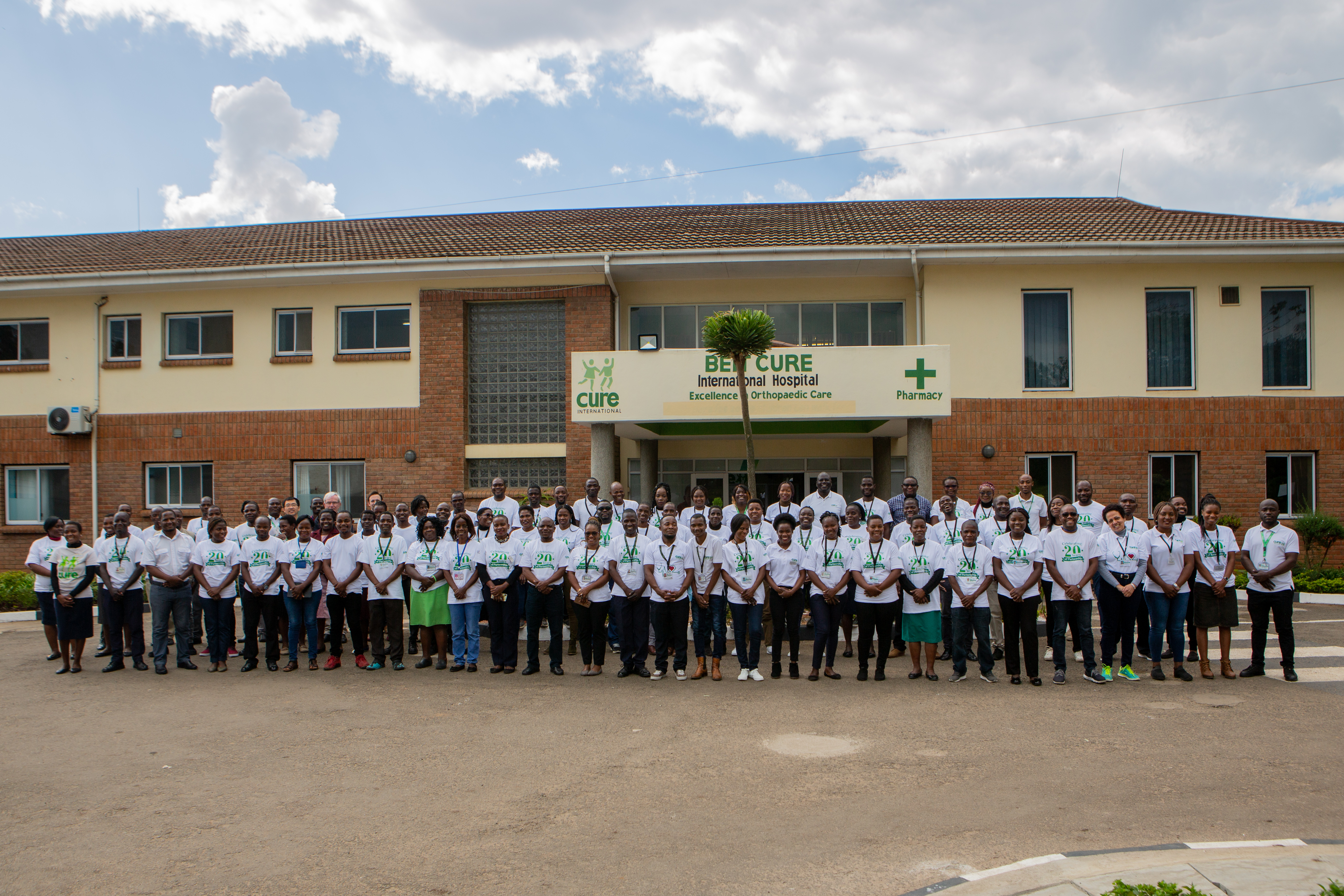
Beit CURE Children's Hospital of Malawi

=== Beit-CURE Children's Hospital of Malawi ===
Established in 2002, Beit-CURE International in Malawi is the only hospital in Sub-Saharan Africa recognized by the Royal College of Surgeons of England. Located in Blantyre, the teaching hospital comprises 58 beds, three operating theaters, and performs over 1,200 reconstructive and orthopedic surgeries each year for people suffering from treatable disabilities. CURE Malawi also provides emotional and spiritual support to patients and their communities. The Beit Trust, a UK-based charity, provided the initial funding for this facility as a gift to the people of Malawi.

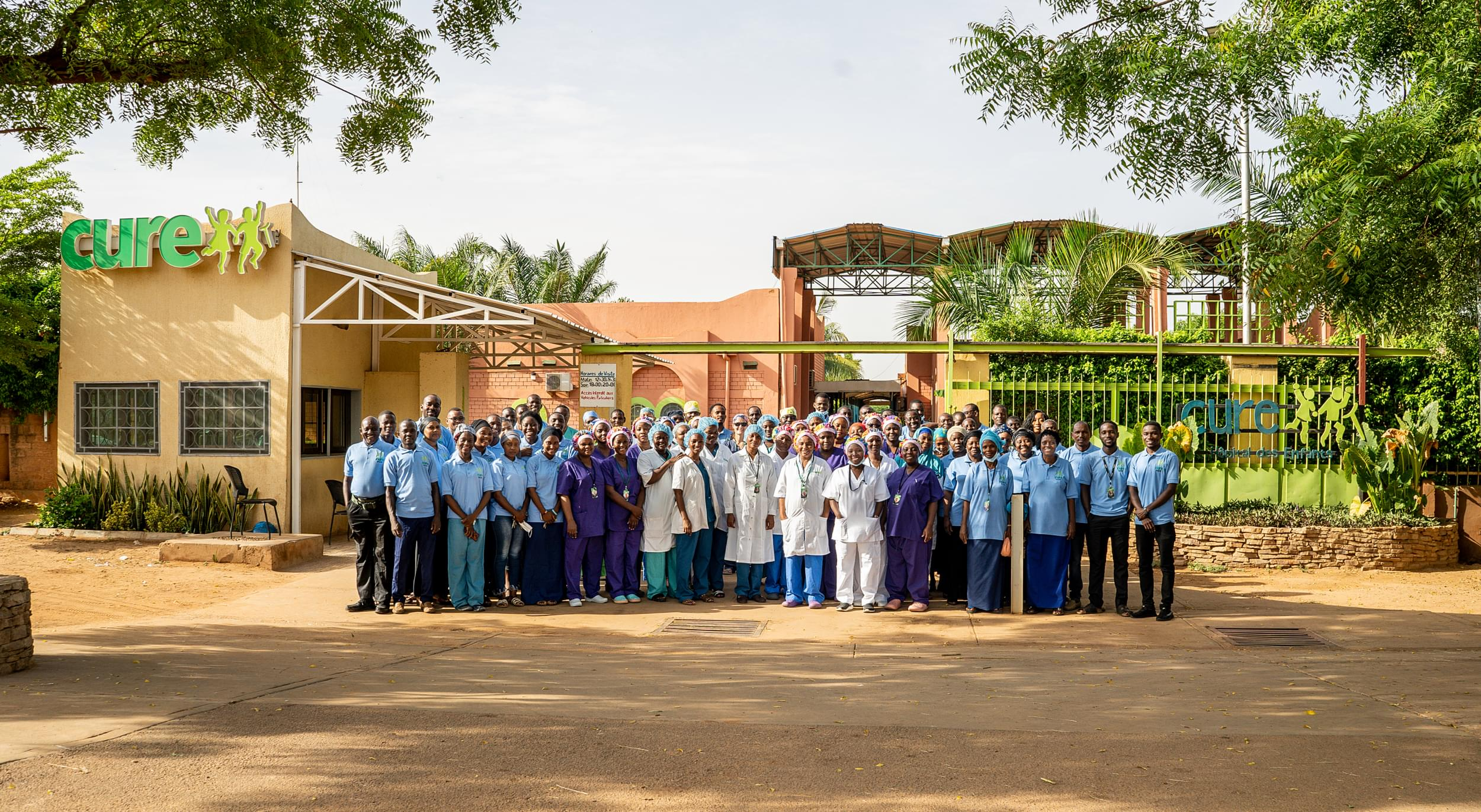
CURE Children's Hospital of Niger

=== CURE Children's Hospital of Niger ===
Established in 2010, CURE Niger is the only hospital in the country of over 24 million that offers specialty surgical care for children living with treatable physical disabilities. Its location was chosen because it is central to one of the most underdeveloped regions in the world. Strategically located in Niamey, CURE Niger is a children's hospital offering 25 beds, two operating rooms, and a full range of high-demand ancillary and rehabilitation services to over 500 surgical patients each year. CURE Niger also provides emotional and spiritual support to patients and their communities.

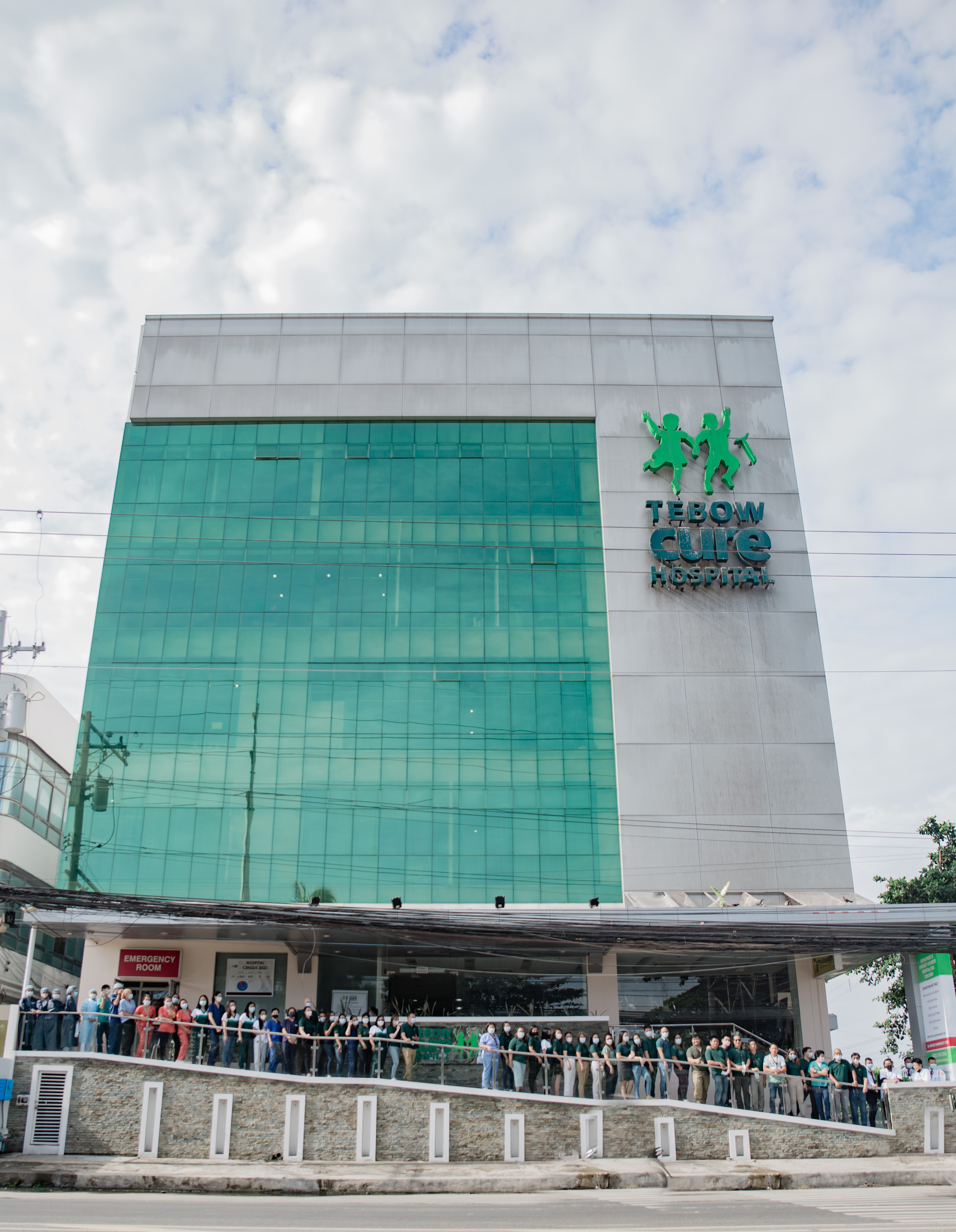
CURE Children's Hospital of the Philippines (Tebow CURE Hospital)

=== Tebow CURE Hospital (CURE Philippines) ===
Established in 2014 through a partnership with the Tim Tebow Foundation, CURE Philippines performs over 1,200 reconstructive plastic and orthopedic surgeries every year for children suffering from treatable disabilities. Located in Davao City, the hospital has 30 beds and three operating rooms to treat pediatric patients with conditions like clubfoot, cleft lip and palate as well as disabilities following chronic burn contractures. CURE Philippines also provides emotional and spiritual support to patients and their communities.

CURE and the Tebow Foundation announced plans to build a children's hospital in the fall of 2011 in the Philippines, the country where ESPN broadcaster Tim Tebow was born. The Tebow CURE Hospital in Davao City, on the island of Mindanao, will hold 30 beds and will specialize in orthopedics. Construction began in January 2012 and was completed in late 2014, with a grand opening in May 2015.

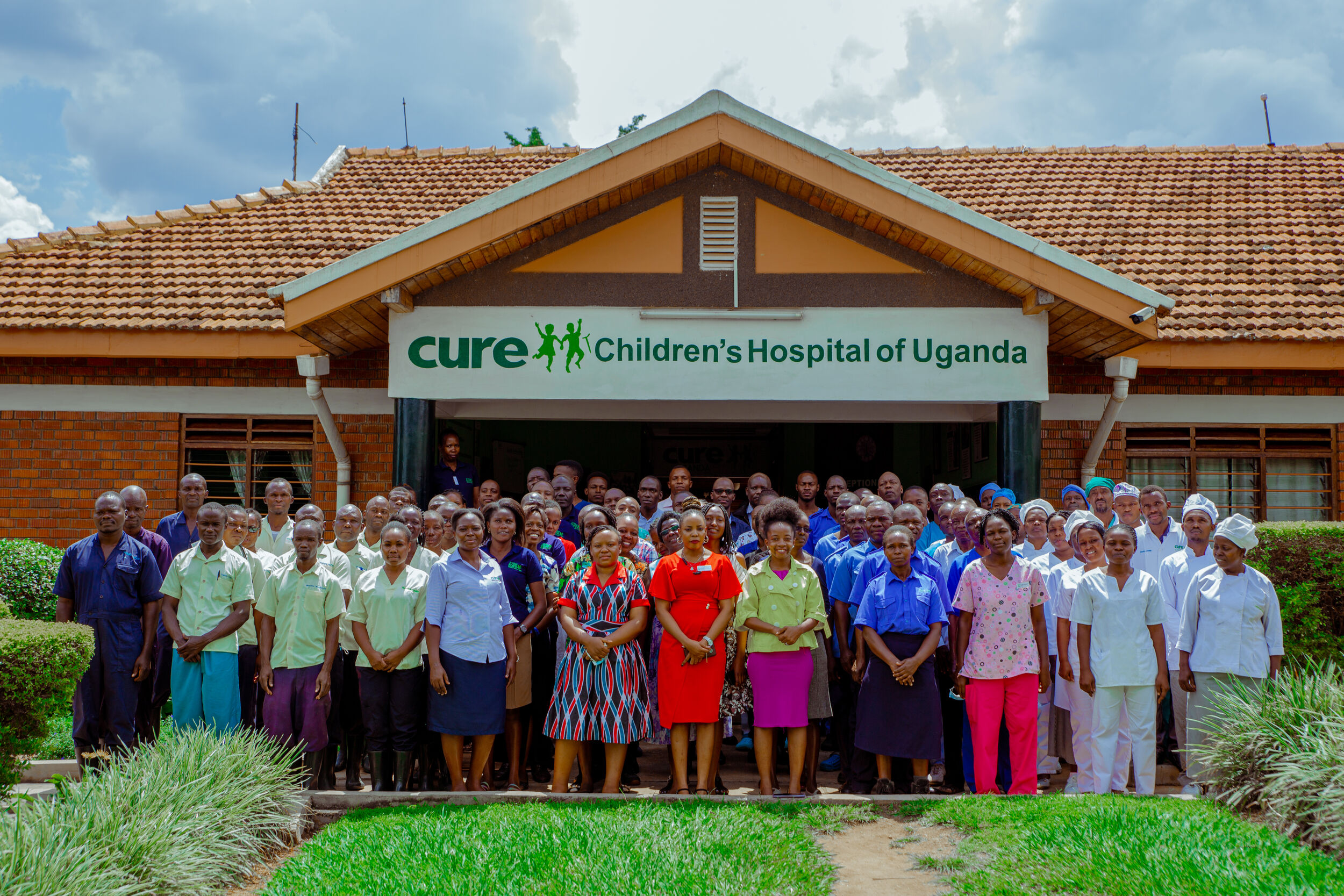
CURE Children's Hospital of Uganda

=== CURE Children's Hospital of Uganda ===
Officially opened in Mbale, Uganda on January 19, 2001, CURE Uganda is one of Africa's leading pediatric hospitals for brain surgery and the treatment of neurological conditions. It provides minimally-invasive endoscopic neurosurgical procedures and attracts surgeons from around the world to its CURE Neuro Fellowship Program. The teaching hospital consists of three operating rooms, an 18-bed intensive care unit and 37 ward beds. Hospital staff complete approximately 2,100 surgical procedures annually for children with conditions including hydrocephalus, spina bifida, brain tumors, and other neural tube defects. CURE Uganda also provides emotional and spiritual support to patients and their communities.

On August 2, 2011, three representatives of CURE Hydrocephalus testified in front of the U.S. House of Representatives Subcommittee on Global Health, Global Human Rights and International Organizations. Dr. Benjamin Warf, former medical director of CURE Uganda, Dr. Steven Schiff, who conducted research at CURE Uganda, and Jim Cohick, Senior Vice President of Specialty Programs at CURE International, spoke on the issue.

On August 1, 2022, BBC World Service Television reported on an innovative surgical procedure available at CURE Uganda for pediatric patients with hydrocephalus.

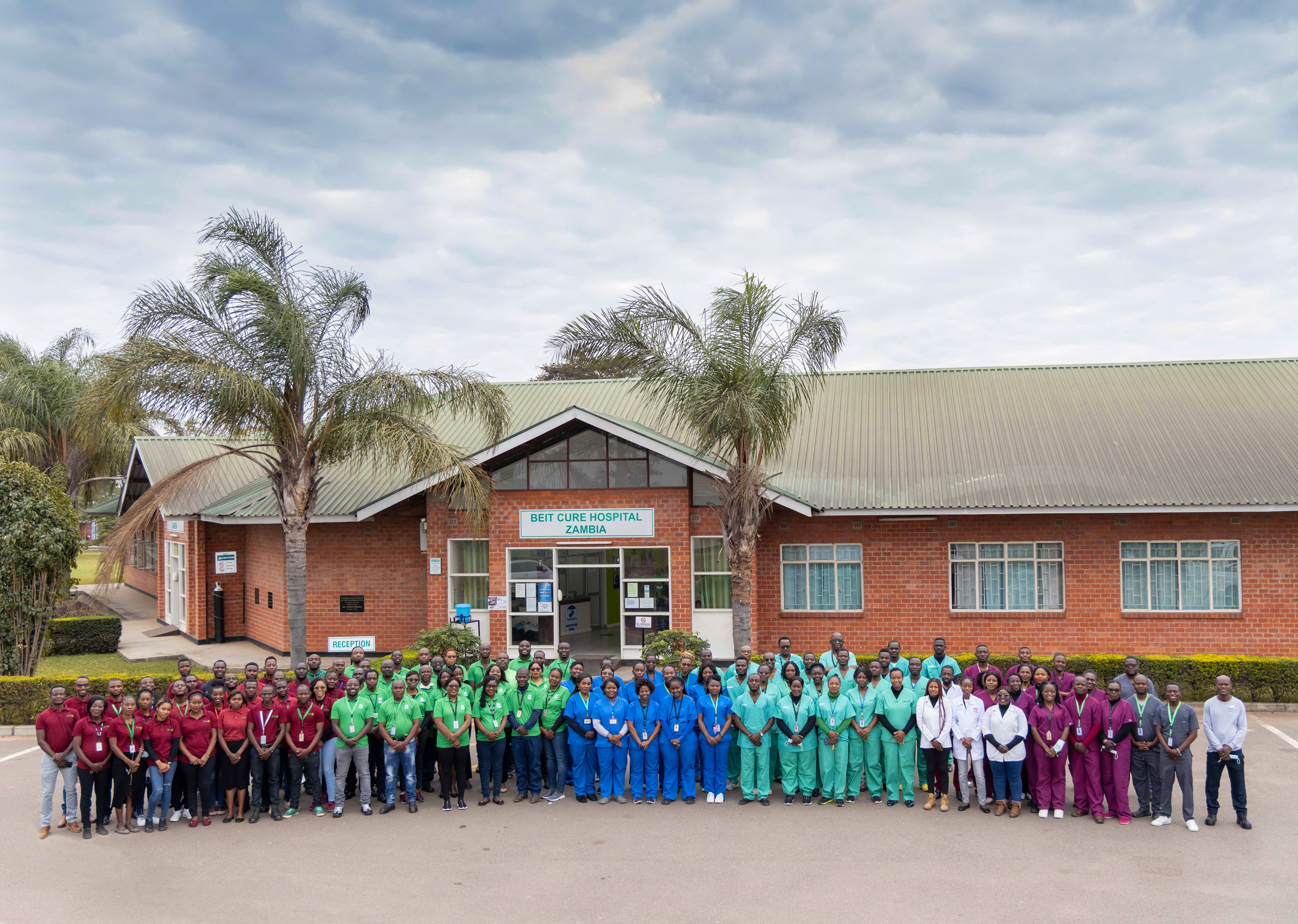
Beit CURE Children's Hospital of Zambia

=== Beit-CURE Children's Hospital of Zambia ===
Established in 2006, CURE Zambia performs over 1,600 reconstructive, orthopedic, ENT, and audiological surgeries each year for children suffering from treatable disabilities. Located in Lusaka, the teaching hospital comprises six buildings, 54 beds, and three operating theaters. CURE Zambia also provides emotional and spiritual support to patients and their communities. The Beit Trust, a UK-based charity, provided the funding for this facility as a centennial gift to the people of Zambia. CURE Zambia is a strategic partner with the Zambian Ministry of Health.

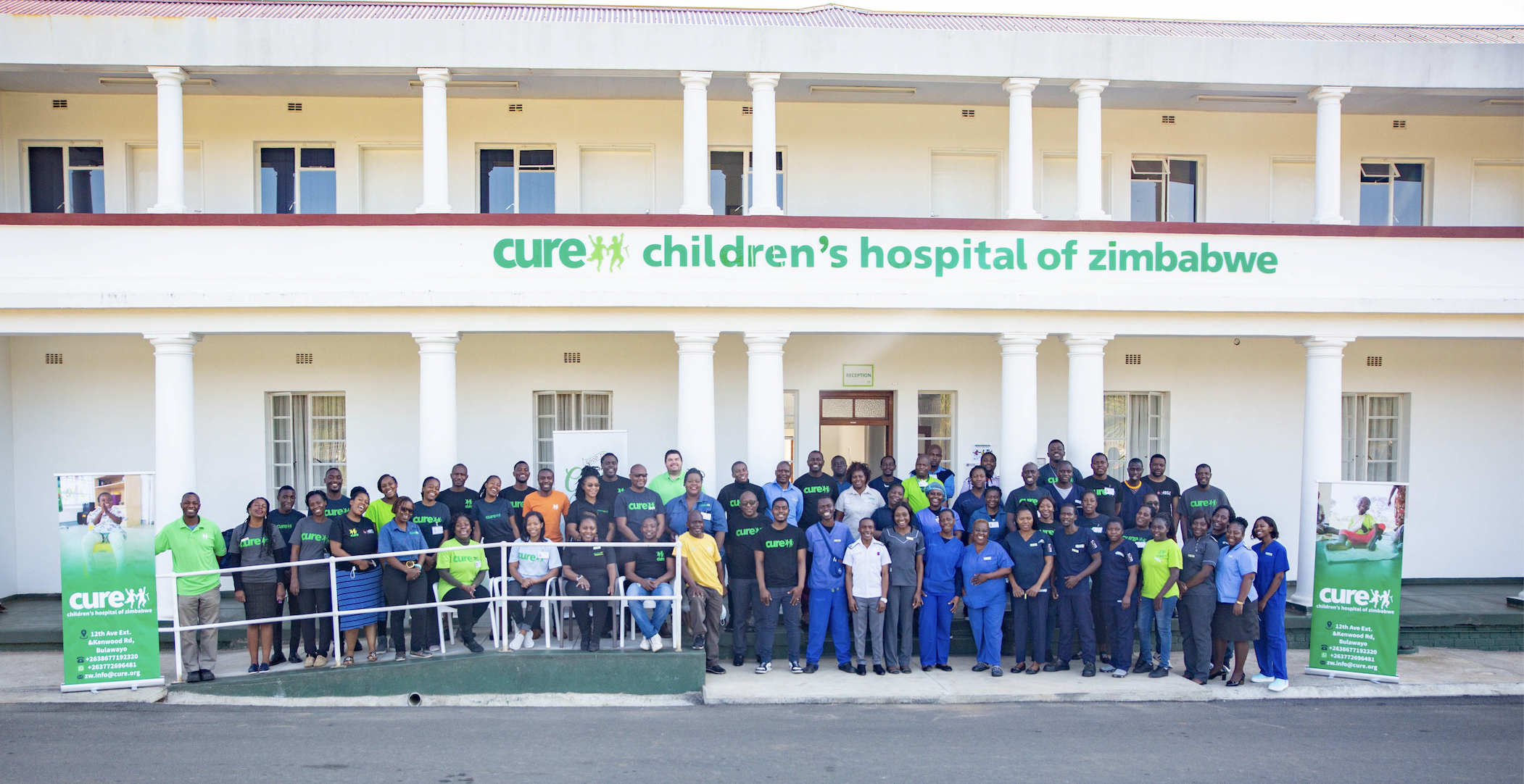
CURE Children's Hospital of Zimbabwe

=== CURE Children's Hospital of Zimbabwe ===
Established in April 2021, CURE Zimbabwe is the first and only hospital in the country of 14 million people to provide orthopedic care for disabilities such as clubfoot, bowed legs, and knock knees to children regardless of their economic status. The teaching hospital was expanded in 2023 to include 42 beds, three operating theaters, an outpatient clinic, and additional lodging for rehabilitation patients. The hospital was refurbished by the Zimbabwe Orthopedic Trust in partnership with the Zimbabwean government and is located adjacent to United Bulawayo Hospital (UBH) in Bulawayo.

== History ==
The organization was founded in 1996 in central Pennsylvania, near Harrisburg, by C. Scott Harrison and his wife, Sally. Ten years earlier, Harrison had traveled to Malawi, Africa to perform spine surgery and teach higher level orthopedic surgery skills to local surgeons. When his tenure as CEO and President of Kirschner Medical was over, Harrison created the Crippled Children's United Rehabilitation Effort (CCURE or C²URE, later CURE), hoping to meet that need. Harrison stepped down as President in 2012.

In partnership with the Africa Inland Church, CURE opened its first hospital in 1998 in Kijabe, Kenya. The African Inland Church (AIC) provided the initial land for the hospital premise as a gift to the people of Kenya. The AIC-CURE Children's Hospital of Kenya partners with The College of Surgeons of East, Central, and Southern Africa (COSECSA) to serve as a regional learning institution.

In 2006, CURE acquired Oasis Hospital in Al Ain, United Arab Emirates. The hospital was established in 1960 by the American missionary couple Pat and Marian Kennedy, who were a part of the missionary organization TEAM (the Evangelical Alliance Mission). The hospital has a focus on maternal health and is the oldest hospital in Al Ain. The hospital became the first non-government hospital in the emirate of Abu Dhabi to receive the Joint Commission International Accreditation in 2007 and was re-accredited in 2010 and 2013.

CURE created a separate division for management of international hospitals, called CURE Healthcare Management Services, in the late 2000s. Capabilities ranged from initial strategic analysis of a project to construction, staffing, outfitting and management. Clients included hospitals not owned by CURE International, in countries such as China, Indonesia and Angola. In 2012 the division became a separate company, renamed CURE Management Services, or CMS, and continued to operate for a few years. The company is no longer active.

CURE International relocated to Grand Rapids, Michigan, in September 2021. At a grand opening celebration, Grand Rapids Mayor Rosalynn Bliss noted, "(CURE's) work is nothing short of a miracle...We now have another strong medical provider to add to the city's and region's growing list. From Spectrum Health, St. Mary's, Metro Health, Cherry Health and so many more. I can proudly say we are home to CURE International."

== Former hospitals ==
United Arab Emirates: The Kanad Hospital (formerly CURE Oasis Hospital), located in Al Ain, was established in 1960 to bring American medical care to the UAE. The hospital delivers 3,500 babies and treats over 122,000 patients annually. CURE acquired the hospital in 2006. CURE International and True Sojourners entered into an agreement that transitioned the Kanad Hospital in Al Ain, United Arab Emirates, between the parties, effective October 1, 2020.

Dominican Republic: The Centro de Ortopedia y Especialidades CURE International, established in 2003, was located in Santo Domingo. It served approximately 700 outpatients per month. The hospital also sent surgical teams into Haiti and responded to the 2010 Haiti earthquake by sending in one of the first surgical teams into that country. The hospital ceased doing surgical operations in 2018.

Honduras: In 2013, the CURE Internacional Hospital de Ortopedia Pediátrica, located in San Pedro Sula, closed due to increasing insecurity in the country, and a lack of funding from the government. During its four years of operation, approximately 20,000 children were treated with orthopedic corrections.

== Programs and research ==
CURE established a program to treat infant clubfoot called CURE Clubfoot Worldwide in 2006. This program then began to expand beyond CURE hospitals and partnered with other national hospitals and established clinics in countries that CURE International did not have a presence in, like Rwanda, Mozambique and India. In 2019, CURE Clubfoot spun off from CURE as a new independent NGO, and was renamed Hope Walks.

CURE Children's Hospital of Uganda attracts surgeons from around the world to its CURE Neuro Fellowship Program. Part of the training program includes the treatment of hydrocephalus using the endoscopic third ventriculostomy and choroid plexus cauterization (ETV/CPC) procedure, a minimally invasive, shunt-less technique developed by Dr. Benjamin Warf.

CURE hospitals and medical professionals have participated in a variety of global health research projects, including:

- Post infective bone gap management of the lower extremity | Pediatric Musculoskeletal Infections | 29 June 2022
- Pediatric foot infections | Pediatric Musculoskeletal Infections | 29 June 2022
- What matters to children with lower limb deformities: an international qualitative study guiding the development of a new patient-reported outcome measure | Journal of Patient Reported Outcomes | 1 April 2021
- Social stigma and cultural beliefs associated with cleft lip and/or palate: parental perceptions of their experience in Kenya | Humanities and Social Sciences Publications | 15 December 2020
- Labio-palatal clefts: epidemiological, clinical, therapeutic, and progressive profiles: about 285 cases in Niger | The Journal of Biomedical Sciences: Health Sciences & Disease | 1 October 2020
- Management of neglected traumatic hip dislocation in children | Journal of Pediatric Orthopaedics | 1 August 2020
- Impact of musculoskeletal impairment on the lives of school-aged children in Ethiopia: a prospective mixed-methods study | East and Central African Journal of Surgery | 1 January 2020
