= Nakimuli =

Nakimuli is a surname that is mainly found in Uganda. Notable people with the surname include:

- Annettee Nakimuli (born 1975), Ugandan obstetrician, gynecologist, and academic
- Etheldreda Nakimuli-Mpungu (born 1974), Ugandan epidemiologist, psychiatrist, and academic
- Helen Nakimuli (1985–2026), Ugandan politician
- Teddy Nakimuli (born 2003), Ugandan boxer
