= Peter Lwabi =

Pediatric cardiologist in Uganda

Deputy Executive Director

Personal details
- Born: Uganda
- Citizenship: Uganda
- Education: MBChB, MMed Master of Medicine (M.Med.) Paediatrics & Child Health
- Occupation: Pediatric Cardiologist, researcher, surgeon
- Profession: Member of the Uganda Medical Association (UMA), Member of the Uganda Heart Association (UHA),Member of the American College of Cardiology (ACC), Member of the Uganda Paediatric Association (UPA)

Lwabi Peter Solomon is a consultant pediatric cardiologist at Mulago National Referral Hospital in Kampala, Uganda. He concurrently serves as the deputy executive director of Uganda Heart Institute (UHI). He also serves as the Head of the Pediatric Cardiology Division at Makerere University School of Medicine. Peter Lwabi also sits on the Board of Directors of UHI. Lwabi is a Senior Consultant cardiac pediatrician who has trained numerous medical personnel, including nurses, medical students, postgraduate students, and cardiology fellows. He provides mentorship and clinical oversight to research and training initiatives,

== Education and background ==
He holds bachelors of medicine and bachelors of surgery and masters of medicine, paediatrics & child health

== Leadership ==
He worked as the president of the Uganda Heart Association. He was also head of the Pediatric Cardiology Division at the Makerere University School of Medicine.A member of the Board of Directors at the Uganda Heart Institute

== See also ==
- Roy Mugerwa
- Aggrey Kiyingi
