= Roy Mugerwa =

Uganda physician and academic} (1942 - 2019)

Roy D. Mugerwa
- Born: 2 January 1942
- Died: 19 April 2019 (aged 77); Nakasero Hospital, Kampala, Uganda
- Citizenship: Uganda
- Education: Makerere University (Bachelor of Medicine and Bachelor of Surgery) (Master of Medicine in Internal Medicine)
- Occupations: Physician, Researcher, Academic
- Known for: Cardiology, HIV/AIDS and tuberculosis research
- Title: Professor Emeritus at Makerere University College of Health Sciences

Roy D. Mugerwa (2 January 1942 – 19 April 2019) was a Ugandan physician, cardiologist and researcher. His contribution to the world of academics include being a Professor Emeritus at Makerere University College of Health Sciences in Kampala, cardiology in Uganda, researching HIV/AIDS and tuberculosis, and his efforts to find an effective HIV vaccine.

== Background ==
Mugerwa was born on 2 January 1942, to Yowana Ziryawula and Maria Namatovu. He pursued his education at St. Mary's College Kisubi for both the O-Level and A-Level and was at the top of his class for all six years. Upon graduation, he admitted to Makerere University, Uganda's oldest and largest public university, and completed both undergraduate and masters programs. He received training in medicine and cardiology at Mulago Hospital and also pursued higher level instruction in the United States, United Kingdom, and the Netherlands. He then returned to Uganda and developed a career in Kampala, serving as faculty at both Mulago Hospital and Makerere University.

== Career ==
=== Early career ===
Dr. Mugerwa's initial specialization was cardiology, and this is what he pursued in the early stages of his career. By 1972, he was one of the first five research fellows to be trained at Mulago Cardiac Clinic, which is the precursor of the present-day Uganda Heart Institute (UHI). Not only did Dr. Mugerwa have a role in founding UHI, but he also served as both Executive Director and Director. Among his other efforts in the world of cardiac health in Uganda are introducing the practice of echocardiography, founding the country's first hypertension clinic, and establishing the Uganda Heart Association.

=== HIV/AIDS epidemic ===
Dr. Mugerwa's career would take a turn away from cardiology after the discovery of HIV/AIDS being present in Uganda. When scientist Wilson Carswell first confirmed there were HIV positive patients in Mulago Hospital in 1984, Dr. Mugerwa was part of a team that joined him as they went Masaka and Rakai and ascertained that the virus had spread there too. They published their findings in 1985, believing these Ugandans suffered from a manifestation of AIDS called Slim Disease, although it would later be known that they were dying of AIDS. In October 1985, shortly after their Slim Disease publication, Dr. Mugerwa attended a Workshop on AIDS in Central Africa, which was put on by the World Health Organization (WHO). The workshop discussed the establishment of an AIDS Surveillance System in every African country, which would be charged with confirming the presence of AIDS and collecting data. Dr. Mugerwa, along with two other colleagues, was appointed to Uganda's AIDS Surveillance Sub-Committee, and by 1986 they had succeeded in implementing public health efforts such as educational programs, supplying condoms, and screening potentially infected blood donors. They also emphasized mutual monogamy, openly disclosing one's HIV status, and increasing the number of available HIV tests.

In the 1980s, Dr. Mugerwa was the Director of Medicine at Mulago Hospital, where the patient prevalence of AIDS reached up to 40% in 1988. During this time, he struggled with low access to confirmatory HIV tests, hospital overcrowding, and the challenge of deciding to tell patients they were dying of AIDS, due to the stigma and shame surrounding the disease. Outside of hospital work, he was one of the founding members of the Uganda-Case Western Reserve University Research Collaboration and held the position of lead principal investigator for twenty years. The main focus of this collaboration was HIV/AIDS and coinfection of tuberculosis in HIV-positive individuals, and this was conducted mainly through clinical studies, providing care to patients, and investigating treatment and prevention methods. Founded in 1988, the collaboration continues to this day. At its 20th anniversary celebration, it was stated that the collaboration had provided over fifty Ugandans with upper level degrees, published over two-hundred articles in peer-reviewed journals, and presented at over five-hundred conferences. Dr. Mugerwa was also a member of the Academic Alliance for AIDS Care and Prevention in Africa. Established in 2001, the Alliance succeeded in providing treatment to patients with HIV/AIDS, training medical providers about HIV/AIDS care, installing programs to increase outreach and prevention efforts, and providing lab resources. The Infectious Disease Institute at Makerere University broke ground in 2003 to help carry out these efforts.

Around this time, suspicions that questioned if HIV truly causes AIDS were circulating, and these were supported by South Africa's president Thabo Mbeki. In opposition to these denialist claims, over five-thousand scientists signed the Durban Declaration in 2000, which cited multiple studies that link HIV as the only cause of AIDS. Dr. Mugerwa demonstrated his support for the Durban Declaration's stance by being on its Organizing Committee.

=== HIV vaccine trial ===
From 1999 to 2002, Dr. Mugerwa conducted a clinical trial of a potential HIV vaccine in Uganda, the first of its kind in Africa. There were concerns about the safety of the volunteers that were recruited, but the normal ethics requirements were waived due to the need for a vaccine as quickly as possible. Uganda had an HIV prevalence of around 20% in 1998, and most citizens could not afford the antiretrovirals needed to prevent the development of AIDS. The prospect of testing a vaccine, however, was not without controversy. There were fears about the vaccine's scientific merit, vaccine recipients falsely testing positive for HIV, and the use of Ugandans as guinea pigs for risky experiments that would only benefit the West.

The vaccine (named ALVAC 205) was tested on forty HIV-negative Ugandans, but was stopped in phase I after newer vaccines started to receive more attention. There was previously doubt about whether the different subtypes of HIV would need different vaccines, but volunteers that received the ALVAC 205 vaccine (designed to fight subtype B) produced blood samples that showed resistance to subtypes A and D as well. This demonstrated that a single HIV vaccine could potentially be effective against multiple HIV subtypes.

== Personal life ==
Mugerwa was married to Rosemary Kibulo Mugerwa, a physical therapist, and they had eleven children together. Many of them followed their parents' example and also pursued careers in the medical field. Outside of his profession, he was both a businessman and a farmer. His wife preceded him in death in November 2018.

== Death ==
Mugerwa died on 19 April 2019, at Nakasero Hospital in Kampala. At the time of his death, he was a Professor Emeritus at Makerere University, where he had also gone to school and conducted research programs. He was said to be suffering from depression, which led to an onset of other illnesses. He was buried in Meru Village, located in Southwestern Uganda.

== Selected publications ==
- Serwadda, D.; Sewankambo, N.K.; Carswell, J.W.; Bayley, A.C.; Tedder, R.S.; Weiss, R.A.; Mugerwa, R.D.; Lwegaba, A.; Kirya, G.B.; Downing, R.G.; Clayden, S.A.; Dalgleish, A.G. (October 1985). "Slim Disease: A New Disease in Uganda and ITS Association with HTLV-III Infection". The Lancet. 326 (8460): 849–852. doi:10.1016/S0140-6736(85)90122-9. PMID 2864575. S2CID 29225611.
- Mugerwa, RD; Marum, LH; Serwadda, D (January 1996). "Human immunodeficiency virus and AIDS in Uganda". East African Medical Journal. 73 (1): 20–6. PMID 8625856.
- Mugerwa, Roy D.; Kaleebu, Pontiano; Mugyenyi, Peter; Katongole-Mbidde, Edward; Hom, David L.; Byaruhanga, Rose; Salata, Robert A.; Ellner, Jerrold J. (26 January 2002). "First trial of the HIV-1 vaccine in Africa: Ugandan experience". BMJ. 324 (7331): 226–229. doi:10.1136/bmj.324.7331.226. PMC 1122137. PMID 11809648.
- Kaleebu, Pontiano; Abimiku, Alash'le; El-Halabi, Shenaaz; Koulla-Shiro, Sinata; Mamotte, Nicole; Mboup, Souleymane; Mugerwa, Roy; Nkengasong, John; Toure-Kane, Coumba; Tucker, Tim; Wassenaar, Douglas; Williamson, Carolyn; Wolday, Dawit (2 December 2008). "African AIDS Vaccine Programme for a Coordinated and Collaborative Vaccine Development Effort on the Continent". PLOS Medicine. 5 (12) e236. doi:10.1371/journal.pmed.0050236. PMC 2592353. PMID 19053171.
- Mahan, C. Scott; Walusimbi, Maria; Johnson, Denise F.; Lancioni, Christina; Charlebois, Edwin; Baseke, Joyce; Chervenak, Keith A.; Mugerwa, Roy D.; Havlir, Diane V.; Mayanja-Kizza, Harriet; Whalen, Christopher C.; Boom, W. Henry; Collaboration, for the Uganda-Case Western Research (22 February 2010). "Tuberculosis Treatment in HIV Infected Ugandans with CD4 Counts >350 Cells/mm3 Reduces Immune Activation with No Effect on HIV Load or CD4 Count". PLOS ONE. 5 (2) e9138. Bibcode:2010PLoSO...5.9138M. doi:10.1371/journal.pone.0009138. PMC 2825253. PMID 20179751.
- Jones-López, Edward C.; Ayakaka, Irene; Levin, Jonathan; Reilly, Nancy; Mumbowa, Francis; Dryden-Peterson, Scott; Nyakoojo, Grace; Fennelly, Kevin; Temple, Beth; Nakubulwa, Susan; Joloba, Moses L.; Okwera, Alphonse; Eisenach, Kathleen D.; McNerney, Ruth; Elliott, Alison M.; Ellner, Jerrold J.; Smith, Peter G.; Mugerwa, Roy D. (15 March 2011). "Effectiveness of the Standard WHO Recommended Retreatment Regimen (Category II) for Tuberculosis in Kampala, Uganda: A Prospective Cohort Study". PLOS Medicine. 8 (3) e1000427. doi:10.1371/journal.pmed.1000427. PMC 3058098. PMID 21423586.

== See also ==
- Peter Lwabi
- Aggrey Kiyingi
