= Hope Walks =

U.S.-based nonprofit organization

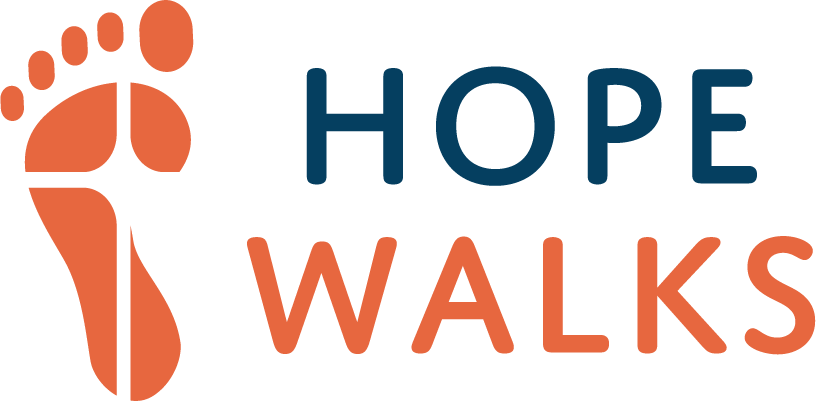
- Founded: 2006
- Type: International child healthcare organization
- Purpose: Infant Clubfoot
- Location: York Springs, Pennsylvania
- Region served: Africa, Central America
- Method: Ponseti method
- Key people: Scott Reichenbach, President
- Website: hopewalks.org
- Formerly called: CURE Clubfoot

Hope Walks, formerly CURE Clubfoot, is a Christian nonprofit organization based in York Springs, Pennsylvania, that treats infant clubfoot in developing countries around the world. As of 2019, Hope Walks operates over 130 clinics in 16 countries including Ethiopia, Niger and the Dominican Republic. Since 2006, over 135,000 children have been enrolled in the program for treatment.

== History ==
Hope Walks began in 2006 as CURE Clubfoot, a program of CURE International. By December 2018 this network of clubfoot treatment centers had treated more than 123,000 children.

In 2018, CURE decided to make the clubfoot program an independent entity, named Hope Walks. Hope Walks focuses on strengthening health systems and public health through the early intervention and correction of children born with clubfoot in Africa and Latin America.

Hope Walks was incorporated in July 2018 and took full ownership of CURE's clubfoot program in June 2019. Today, Hope Walks is the largest Christian organization treating children with clubfoot. Hope Walks has been able to enroll nearly 136,000 kids since 2006.

On World Clubfoot Day, June 3, 2017, CURE Clubfoot announced a strategy to end clubfoot as a global disability, in partnership with the Global Clubfoot Initiative. The goal was set for at least 70% of children born with clubfoot in lower and middle countries to have access to treatment by 2030. Currently, less than 15% of children in these countries access treatment that would prevent a lifetime of disability. As a founding member of the Global Clubfoot Initiative, Hope Walks is a sponsor of Run Free 2030, a global initiative to see all children born with clubfoot have access to quality clubfoot care and treatment using the Ponseti method by 2030.

== Method ==
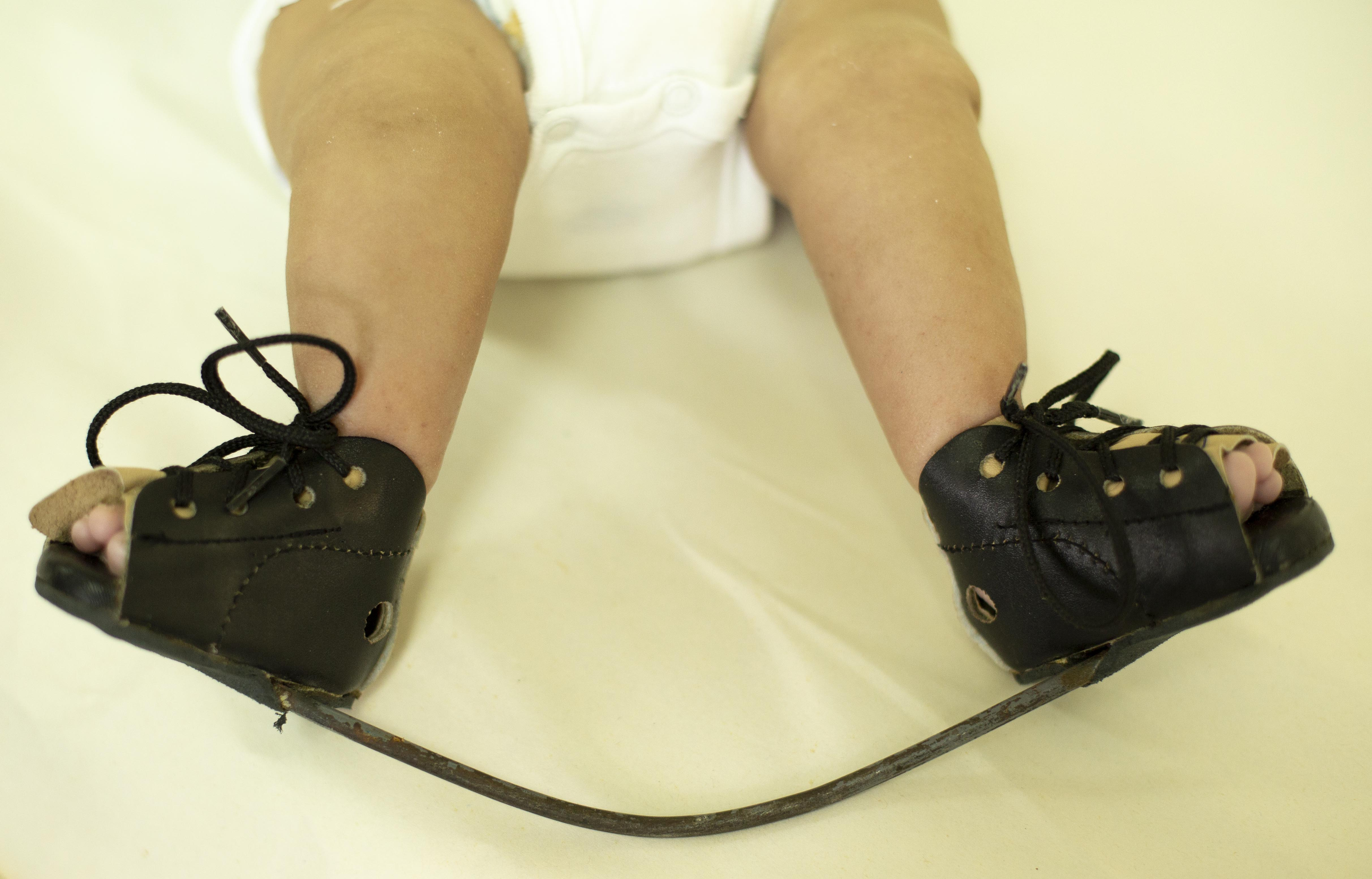
Foot abduction brace used by Hope Walks

Hope Walks uses a method to treat infants born with clubfoot, known as the Ponseti method. This non-surgical method corrects the clubfoot with a series of casts over the course of four to six weeks, slowly manipulating the foot into a correct position. Typically, this method also includes a tenotomy. After the casting phase is completed, the child will wear a foot abduction brace while sleeping at night for the next five years in order to prevent relapse.

In addition to the physical treatment of clubfoot, Hope Walks also uses counselors to provide education about the condition in order to eliminate the emotional shame that parents typically feel because of cultural stigma. These counselors also help coordinate the care of the child throughout the five-year process.
