= ECSACOP =

African medical organization

East, Central and Southern Africa College of Physicians
- Abbreviation: ECSACOP
- Formation: December 2015; 10 years ago
- Type: Professional association
- Legal status: Non-government organization
- Headquarters: 2nd floor IDI-Mckinell, Knowledge center, P.BOx 22418, Kampala
- Location: Kampala, Uganda
- Official language: English
- President: Professor James Jowi of Kenya
- Website: https://ecsacop.org/

The East, Central and Southern Africa College of Physicians (ECSACOP) provides training in the region of East, Central, and Southern Africa as an independent organisation that supports postgraduate education in internal medicine. A standard internal medicine training curriculum is provided by ECSACOP, together with a qualification exam that has been internationally benchmarked. Kenya, Malawi, Rwanda, Tanzania, Uganda, Zambia, and Zimbabwe are the current seven sub-Saharan nations where ECSACOP conducts operations on a non-profit basis.

== Partner organisations ==
The College also has a long-standing collaboration programme with the Royal College of Physicians.

== See also ==
COSECSA - College of Surgeons of East, Central and Southern Africa

ECSACOG - East, Central and Southern Africa College of Obstetrics and Gynecology
