= ECSACOG =

African medical organization

East, Central and Southern Africa College of Obstetrics and Gynecology
- Abbreviation: ECSACOG
- Formation: September 2017; 9 years ago
- Type: Professional association
- Legal status: Non-government organization
- Location: Arusha, Tanzania
- Official language: English
- President: Annettee Nakimuli
- Website: https://www.ecsacog.org

The East, Central and Southern Africa College of Obstetrics and Gynecology is an autonomous organization that supports postgraduate obstetrics and gynecology education in the region of East, Central, and Southern Africa. ECSACOG offers a qualifying exam that has been internationally benchmarked along with a training curriculum that is standardized. Ethiopia, Kenya, Malawi, Mozambique, Rwanda, South Sudan, Tanzania, Uganda, Zambia, and Zimbabwe are the current ten sub-Saharan nations where ECSACOG conducts operations on a non-profit basis.

== See also ==
- COSECSA - College of Surgeons of East, Central and Southern Africa
- ECSACOP - East, Central and Southern Africa College of Physicians
