= Annettee Nakimuli =

Ugandan obstetrician and gynecologist, medical consultant, researcher and academic

Annettee Olivia Nakimuli
- Born: 1975 (age 50–51); Uganda
- Citizenship: Uganda
- Education: Makerere University (Bachelor of Medicine and Bachelor of Surgery) (Master of Medicine in Obstetrics and Gynecology) (Doctor of Philosophy in Obstetrics and Gynecology)
- Occupations: Obstetrician, Gynecologist, Researcher, Academic
- Years active: 2000–present
- Known for: Medical practice & research
- Title: Head of Obstetrics and Gynecology and Dean; Makerere University School of Medicine; President of the East, Central and Southern Africa College of Obstetrics and Gynecology

Annettee Olivia Nakimuli is a Ugandan obstetrician, gynecologist, medical researcher, academic and academic administrator. Since 17 February 2021, she serves as the Dean of Makerere University School of Medicine, the oldest medical school in East Africa. She concurrently serves as the Head of Department of Obstetrics and Gynecology at the same medical school, a role she has served in since 2016. She is also the President of the East, Central and Southern Africa College of Obstetrics and Gynecology.

== Background and education ==
She was born in the Buganda Region of Uganda. After attending primary and secondary schools, she was admitted to Makerere University to study human medicine. Her first degree was the Bachelor of Medicine and Bachelor of Surgery (MBChB). Her Master of Medicine in Obstetrics and Genecology (MMed Obs & Gyn) was also obtained from Makerere. Later, she was awarded a Doctor of Philosophy (PhD) degree by Makerere University in collaboration with the University of Cambridge. Her dissertation for the PhD thesis was titled "The Role of Natural Killer Cells in Pre-eclampsia in an African Population".

== Career ==
Nakimuli is a clinical researcher in complications of pregnancy, with focus on pre-eclampsia and eclampsia among sub-Saharan African women. Her work, with collaborators from the University of Cambridge identified a genetic locus, associated with protection from developing pre-eclampsia (Nakimuli et al., PNAS 2015). This genetic region has only been described among people of African ancestry. More work in this area is ongoing.

She has published widely in peer-reviewed publications and has in excess of 65 publications to her name.

== Other responsibilities ==
In her capacity as the dean of the school of medicine at Makerere University Medical School, within Makerere University College of Health Sciences, Nakimuli concurrently serves as the head of department of obstetrics and gynecology at the same medical school. She is also a consultant in obstetrics and gynecology at Mulago National Referral Hospital, the teaching hospital of Makerere University School of Medicine.

She serves on several international and national committees, including:

- Uganda Maternal and Newborn Technical working group, Steering Committee of the MultiOmics for Mothers and Infants (MOMI) Consortium at the Bill and Melinda Gates Foundation.
- She previously served as the Vice President of the East Central and Southern Africa College of Obstetrics and Gynaecology (ECSACOG) which was established in 2017".

== Recent developments ==
During the fourth quarter of calendar year 2021, Associate Professor Nakimuli was awarded a five-year research grant worth US$1 million, by the Gates Foundation. The Calestous Juma Science Leadership Fellowship, is for research into the "Great Obstetrical Syndromes"(GOS), including intrauterine growth retardation, stillbirth, preterm birth, pre-eclampsia and eclampsia, among women of African descent.

== Selected publications ==
- Annettee Nakimuli; Olympe Chazara; Hiby, Susan; et al. (2015). "A KIR B centromeric region present in Africans but not Europeans protects pregnant women from pre-eclampsia". Proceedings of the National Academy of Sciences of the United States of America. 112 (3): 845–850. Bibcode:2015PNAS..112..845N. doi:10.1073/pnas.1413453112. PMC 4311823. PMID 25561558. Wikidata Q35031374.
- Voices from the frontline: findings from a thematic analysis of a rapid online global survey of maternal and newborn health professionals facing the COVID-19 pandemic. This study found substantial knowledge gaps exist in guidance on management of maternity cases with or without COVID-19.
- Male involvement during pregnancy and childbirth: men's perceptions, practices and experiences during the care for women who developed childbirth complications in Mulago Hospital, Uganda. This study generated information on perceived roles, expectations, experiences and challenges faced by men who wish to be involved in maternal health issues, particularly during pregnancy and childbirth.
- A Risk prediction model for the assessment and triage of women with hypertensive disorders of pregnancy in low-resourced settings: The miniPIERS (Pre-eclampsia Integrated Estimate of RiSk) multi-country prospective cohort study. The article found reasonable ability to identify women at increased risk of adverse maternal outcomes associated with the hypertensive disorders of pregnancy.
- Indirect effects of COVID-19 on maternal, neonatal, child, sexual and reproductive health services in Kampala, Uganda.
- Protecting hard-won gains for mothers and newborns in low-income and middle-income countries in the face of COVID-19: call for a service safety net. The study suggested that providing adequate funding to maintain essential services alongside urgent action plans for COVID-19 is essential to enable rapid adaptation and modifications to service delivery in response to different transmission scenarios and stages of the pandemic.
- Pregnancy, parturition and preeclampsia in women of African ancestry. Among others the study suggested that there are particularly strong evolutionary selective pressures operating during pregnancy and delivery in Africans.
- Does knowledge of danger signs of pregnancy predict birth preparedness? A critique of the evidence from women admitted with pregnancy complications. The study emphasized the need to prioritize emergency/complication readiness during antenatal care sessions.
- Still births, neonatal deaths and neonatal near miss cases attributable to severe obstetric complications: a prospective cohort study in two referral hospitals in Uganda. This study established that antepartum hemorrhage, ruptured uterus, severe preeclampsia, eclampsia, and the syndrome of Hemolysis, Elevated Liver Enzymes, Low Platelets (HELLP syndrome), led to statistically significant attributable risk of newborn deaths (still birth or neonatal deaths).
- Maternal near misses from two referral hospitals in Uganda: a prospective cohort study on incidence, determinants and prognostic factors.
- The burden of maternal morbidity and mortality attributable to hypertensive disorders in pregnancy: a prospective cohort study from Uganda.
- 'We are not going to shut down, because we cannot postpone pregnancy': a mixed-methods study of the provision of maternal healthcare in six referral maternity wards in four sub-Saharan African countries during the COVID-19 pandemic.
- KIR2DS5 allotypes that recognize the C2 epitope of HLA-C are common among Africans and absent from Europeans. This study found that KIR2DS5*005 has the KIR2DS5 consensus sequence and was the only allele found at both centromeric and telomeric locations of KIR2DS5.
- Variations in killer-cell immunoglobulin-like receptor and human leukocyte antigen genes and immunity to malaria.
- Effect of a novel vital sign device on maternal mortality and morbidity in low-resource settings: a pragmatic, stepped-wedge, cluster-randomised controlled trial.
- Time trends in and factors associated with repeat adolescent birth in Uganda: Analysis of six demographic and health surveys.
- Relative impact of pre-eclampsia on birth weight in a low resource setting: A prospective cohort study.

== See also ==
- Uganda Ministry of Health
- Diana Atwine
- List of Hospitals in Uganda
- Jane Aceng
- Health in Uganda
