= Uganda Heart Institute =

- Uganda Ministry of Health
- Location within Kampala

Geography
- Location: Mulago, Kampala, Uganda
- Coordinates: 00°20′17″N 32°34′31″E

Organisation
- Care system: Public
- Type: General and Teaching
- Affiliated university: Makerere University College of Health Sciences

Services
- Emergency department: I
- Beds: 250 (Planned)

History
- Founded: 1988

Links
- Other links: Hospitals in Uganda; Medical education in Uganda

Uganda Heart Institute (UHI) is a specialized, public, tertiary care medical facility owned by the Uganda Ministry of Health and located in the Ugandan capital Kampala. It is a component of Mulago National Referral Hospital, the largest hospital in Uganda, which serves as the teaching hospital of Makerere University College of Health Sciences.

== Location ==
The Institute is located on Mulago Hill in the northern part of the city of Kampala. It sits within the Mulago Hospital Complex, the teaching hospital of the Makerere University College of Health Sciences. This location is approximately 4.5 kilometres (2.8 mi) north of the central business district of Kampala, the capital and largest city of Uganda. The coordinates of the Institute are 0°20'17.0"N, 32°34'31.0"E (Latitude:0.338056; Longitude:32.575278).

== Overview ==
Uganda Heart Institute (UHI) was established as an autonomous body by an Act of Parliament (The Uganda Heart Institute ACT, 2016). The Institute is now a provider of cardiovascular services and the only National Referral Facility for heart diseases in Uganda. Currently, UHI using a modest investment and an enabling legal framework, has trained cardiac specialists and installed a cardiac catheterization laboratory and operating theatre, which have enabled them to conduct heart surgeries and interventions.

Uganda Heart Institute handles over 20,000 patients annually. The Institute started carrying out Open Heart Surgery in 2007 and to-date; over 7000 heart operations have been performed. This in effect means the Uganda Heart Institute can handle over 95 percent of the adult cases and 85 percent of the cases among children in Uganda. This is in line with the National Development Plan II (NDP2) strategy of reducing referrals abroad to less than 5 percent.

In order to improve access to heart care, UHI is developing capacity to operationalize regional centers in collaboration with the Ministry of Health and Regional Referral Hospitals. The Institute is partnering with various stakeholders including civil society, to promote health through advocating for a healthy lifestyle. The preventive programs are being addressed through a multi-sectoral approach with the Ministry of Health and other local and international partners. What Uganda Heart Institute needs now is more working space and lager operational budgets to enable it fulfill its mandate.

== History ==
In 1988, the Uganda Heart Foundation, in collaboration with the Uganda Ministry of Health, Makerere University and Mulago National Referral Hospital, started the Uganda Heart Institute, using space provided on Ward 1C, in the New Mulago Hospital Complex. This resurrected plans to establish a specialized cardiac unit at Mulago, began in 1958, but were killed in 1972, with the expulsion of the Ugandan Asians by dictator Idi Amin. Since 1988, the Institute has received valuable contribution from national and international donors including the Rotary Club. Media reports indicate that of the 1.5 million children born every year in Uganda, about 15,000 have heart defects at birth (congenital heart abnormalities). Of those, about 8,000 children require corrective surgeries. Uganda's only heart institute has the capacity to perform only 1,000 heart operations annually. That leaves a backlog of 7,000 youngsters every year.

== Expansion plans ==
Beginning in August 2015, the Government of Uganda had plans to break ground for a new 200 bed hospital to be named Uganda Institute of Cardiothoracic Diseases, to replace the current Uganda Heart Institute. The new hospital will have three operating theatres, cardiac catheterization laboratories, an Intensive Care Unit, and research facilities. The construction will be funded by a US$64.9 million (UGX:169 billion) loan from the Islamic Development Bank. It is anticipated that the Institute will seek financial autonomy to raise funds, hire staff, pay salaries, and procure supplies, independent of Mulago Hospital, similar to the autonomy enjoyed by the Uganda Cancer Institute.

The New Vision newspaper, reported in November 2016, that Uganda Heart Institute had acquired land measuring 2.5 acres (10,000 m^{2}) along Owen Road in the Mulago neighborhood, where it was going to build its new headquarters. The new complex will consist of three towers: (a) the first tower will house the outpatient clinics and hospital beds, including an intensive care unit (b) the second tower will include research laboratories and conference rooms and (c) the third tower will house critical staff, such as research fellows, residents and biomedical engineers. Total cost for the entire project is budgeted at US$65 million, of which US$51 million is for construction and the US$14 million balance is for equipment.

In April 2022, Dr John Omagino, the Executive director of UHI disclosed that the institute had acquired 10 acres (4.0 ha) of land in the Naguru–Nakawa Government Complex. The institute plans to build a 250-bed hospital here, expandable to 1,000 beds over time. The new hospital is expected to save the government of Uganda an estimated US$73 million that is spent on treating high ranking government officials overseas annually.

In July 2022, the UHI disclosed that a consortium comprising the Saudi Fund for Development, the OPEC Fund for International Development and the Arab Bank for Economic Development in Africa had agreed to lend US$75 million (UGX 285 billion) "for establishing a state-of-the-art heart surgery and treatment centre", at Naguru, in Kampala. This new hospital will be capable of performing 5,000 heart surgeries annually, up from the current 1,000 performed in the limited space at Mulago. In March 2024, the New Vision newspaper reported that total amount borrowed from the three Middle Eastern lenders totaled USh223 billion (US$61 million in 2024 money).

In February 2025, the beginning of construction of the initial 250-bed hospital was flagged off by Uganda's prime minister, Robinah Nabbanja. Of the 250 beds, 40 will be acute care cardiac beds. The facility will also incorporate three operating theaters and two cardiac catheterization rooms. Construction is expected to conclude, followed by commercial commissioning in Q1 2027.

== Expansion budget and financing ==
The plan calls for a 250- bed hospital in the first phase, expandable to 500 beds in the second phase and to 1,000 beds in the third phase. The construction of the new headquarters and hospital is budgeted at US$73 million. The table below illustrates the sources of finding for the project.

Uganda Heart Institute Expansion Funding
Rank	Development Partner	Funding in US$ million	Percentage	Notes
1	Saudi Fund for Development (SFD)	30.0	41.09	Loan
2	OPEC Fund for International Development (OFID)	20.0	27.40	Loan
3	Arab Bank for Economic Development in Africa (BADEA)	20.0	27.40	Loan
4	Government of Uganda (GoU)	3.0	4.11	Equity
	Total	73.0	100.00	

The engineering, procurement and construction (EPC) contract was awarded to Arab Contractors Uganda Limited at a contract price of US$45.4 million. Two Chinese construction companies, who did not win the bid, complained to a government tribunal that adjudicates such disputes in the country. In Q3 2024, the tribunal ruled in favor of Arab Contractors. Construction is expected to begin in Q4 2024.

== New developments ==
On Monday 22 January 2018, an all-Ugandan team of 14 healthcare specialists performed the first coronary artery bypass surgery operation by an all Ugandan team, in the history of the heart institute. The successful 10-hour operation was billed at USh18 million (approx. US$5,000), compared to USh300 million (approx. US$83,000), if it were done in a private hospital in South Africa, a common destination for Ugandan patients with means.

In April 2018, a cohort of 11 patients with abnormal heart rhythms, underwent a procedure called catheter ablation using the radiofrequency ablation method. All eleven of the patients benefited and recovered well. This was the first time this type of procedure was performed in Uganda.

== Board of directors ==
As of July 2026 the following constituted the nine-member UHI board of Directors.

Member of the Board of Uganda Heart Institute
Rank	Name	Title	Notes
1	Dr. James Magara	Chairman	Dental surgeon and management consultant
2	Dr. Rosemary Byanyima	Member	Executive Director Mulago National Referral Hospital
3	Dr. Charles Akiya Oyoo	Member	Commissioner, Non-Communicable Diseases Uganda Ministry of Health
4	Irene Lugayizi,	Member	Attorney at law
5	Grace Ndyareeba	Member	Financial consultant. Managing Director and CEO of MicroPay, a Ugandan fintech.
6	John Odiri Ogund Omagino	UHI Executive Director	Cardiovascular surgeon
7	Joseph Mutasaaga	Member	Head of Business Planning and Development at the National Drug Authority
8	Dr. Henry Ddungu	Member	Consultant Hematologist and Ocologist at Uganda Cancer Institute
9	Rosemary Mutyabule	Member	Chairperson of Busitema University Council

== List of medical directors of UHI ==
The following cardiologists and cardiothoracic surgeons have served as the executive directors of the Uganda Heart Institute since its foundation in 1988:

1. Francis Omaswa, cardiovascular surgeon, 1988 - 1998
2. Roy Mugerwa, cardiologist, 1998 - 2008
3. John Omagino, cardiothoracic surgeon, since 2008

== See also ==
- Makerere University School of Medicine
- Hospitals in Uganda
- Mulago Women's Referral Hospital
- Uganda Cancer Institute
- List of medical schools in Uganda
- Makerere University College of Health Sciences
