= COSECSA =

College of Surgeons of East, Central and Southern Africa
- Abbreviation: COSECSA
- Formation: December 1999; 26 years ago
- Type: Professional association
- Legal status: Non-government organization
- Headquarters: ECSA Health Community Building, 157 Olorien, Njiro Road
- Location: Arusha, Tanzania
- Members: ~1,000
- Official language: English
- President: Dr Fualal Jane Odubu of Uganda
- Website: Homepage

The College of Surgeons of East, Central and Southern Africa (COSECSA) is an independent body that fosters postgraduate education in surgery and provides surgical training throughout the region of East, Central and Southern Africa. COSECSA delivers a common surgical training programme with an internationally bench-marked exam and qualification.

COSECSA is a non-profit making body that currently operates in 14 countries in the sub-Saharan region: Botswana, Burundi, Ethiopia, Kenya, Malawi, Mozambique, Namibia, Rwanda, South Sudan, Sudan, Tanzania, Uganda, Zambia and Zimbabwe.

== History ==
COSECSA grew out of the Association of Surgeons of East Africa (ASEA). ASEA was formally inaugurated in Nairobi, Kenya on 9 November 1950. In 1996, in response to perceived inadequacies of surgical training in the region, the ASEA steering committee decided to create the College of Surgeons of East, Central & Southern Africa (COSECSA). These inadequacies were seen to be the limited capacity of university teaching hospitals' surgical training programmes, the increasing difficulty in accessing UK surgical training programmes at that time and the variability of training programmes from country to country.

The official inauguration of the College was held in Nairobi in December 1999. In December 2001, at the first annual general meeting in Lusaka, Zambia the council of the college was elected by the foundation fellows.

== Training model ==
COSECSA has been described as a "college without walls." Trainee surgeons undertake their clinical training in accredited hospitals under supervision of an accredited trainer. The academic component of the programme is delivered online, through an e-learning portal, and through workshops held across the region.

== Academic structure ==
COSECSA has two programmes: (a) Membership: A certificate of competence in surgery at General Medical Officer Grade (minimum 2 years training) and (b) Fellowship: A specialist qualification in General Surgery, Cardiothoracic Surgery, Orthopaedic Surgery, Neurosurgery, Urology, Paediatric Surgery, Paediatric Orthopaedic Surgery, Plastic Surgery and Otorhinolaryngology (minimum 5 years training).

As of December 2016, COSECSA has graduated a cumulative total of 206 Fellows, with another 389 trainees actively training in 60 accredited training hospitals. At that time, there were 973 members and fellows of the college.

A complete list of current fellows and members is available at this online reference.

== Partner organisations ==
COSECSA is a founding association of the Pan African Association of Surgeons. The College also has a long-standing collaboration programme with the Royal College of Surgeons in Ireland.

== See also ==
- ECSACOP - East, Central and Southern Africa College of Physicians
- ECSACOG - East, Central and Southern Africa College of Obstetrics and Gynecology
